= List of Canterbury-Bankstown Bulldogs seasons =

This is a list of seasons for the Canterbury-Bankstown Bulldogs rugby league club.

== Seasons ==
=== First grade ===
Table key
⁑	Competition conducted by New South Wales Rugby League
#	Competition conducted by Australian Rugby League
~	Competition conducted by Super League
‡	Club finished regular season in first position to win the minor premiership (and the J. J. Giltinan Shield since 1998)
†	Club finished regular season in last position (wooden spoon)
DNQ	Club did not qualify for finals

Table of yearly win–loss records, with finals results, and key personnel
Season	Club	WCC	Cup	Regular season				Finals results			Coach	Captain(s) (Note: Official club captains.)	Ref
Season	Club	WCC	Cup	Pos.	W	L	D	Final position	W	L	Coach	Captain(s)	Ref
1935⁑	1935	—N/a	—N/a	8th	2	14	0	DNQ			Tedda Courtney	Jack Morrison	
1936⁑	1936	—N/a	—N/a	3rd	9	3	2	Lost semi final	0	1	Frank Burge	Alan Brady	
1937⁑	1937	—N/a	—N/a	5th	4	4	0	—			George Mason	Alan Brady	
1938⁑	1938	—N/a	—N/a	1st‡	11	1	2	Premiers	2	0	Jim Craig	Alan Brady	
1939⁑	1939	—N/a	—N/a	2nd	10	4	0	Lost semi final	0	1	Jerry Brien	Alan Brady	
1940⁑	1940	—N/a	—N/a	3rd	8	6	0	Runners-up	1	1	Alan Brady	Alan Brady → Jack Bonnyman	
1941⁑	1941	—N/a	—N/a	3rd	9	5	0	Lost semi final	0	1	Ron Bailey	Ron Bailey	
1942⁑	1942	—N/a	—N/a	1st‡	10	4	0	Premiers	2	1	Jerry Brien	Ron Bailey	
1943⁑	1943	—N/a	—N/a	8th†	3	11	0	DNQ			Roy Kirkaldy	Roy Kirkaldy	
1944⁑	1944	—N/a	—N/a	8th†	3	10	1	DNQ			Ron Bailey → Cec Fifield	Ron Bailey	
1945⁑	1945	—N/a	—N/a	6th	4	9	1	DNQ			Bill Kelly	George Kilham	
1946⁑	1946	—N/a	—N/a	4th	8	5	1	Lost preliminary final	1	1	Ross McKinnon	Ron Bailey	
1947⁑	1947	—N/a	—N/a	1st‡	13	4	1	Runners-up	1	2	Ross McKinnon	Henry Porter	
1948⁑	1948	—N/a	—N/a	5th	7	9	2	DNQ			Arthur Halloway	Henry Porter	
1949⁑	1949	—N/a	—N/a	7th	6	10	2	DNQ			Henry Porter	Bruce Hopkins	
1950⁑	1950	—N/a	—N/a	6th	9	9	0	DNQ			Alby Why	Eddie Burns	
1951⁑	1951	—N/a	—N/a	7th	7	11	0	DNQ			Vic Bulgin → Alby Why	Vic Bulgin	
1952⁑	1952	—N/a	—N/a	9th	5	12	1	DNQ			Alby Why	Ken Charlton	
1953⁑	1953	—N/a	—N/a	6th	9	7	2	DNQ			Jack Hampstead	Cec Cooper	
1954⁑	1954	—N/a	—N/a	8th	4	14	0	DNQ			Jack Hampstead	Leo Trevena	
1955⁑	1955	—N/a	—N/a	9th	4	14	0	DNQ			Vic Hey	Ray Gartner	
1956⁑	1956	—N/a	—N/a	7th	6	12	0	DNQ			Vic Hey	Col Geelan	
1957⁑	1957	—N/a	—N/a	9th	3	14	1	DNQ			Col Geelan	Col Geelan	
1958⁑	1958	—N/a	—N/a	9th	4	13	1	DNQ			Cec Cooper	Ray Gartner	
1959⁑	1959	—N/a	—N/a	9th	5	12	1	DNQ			Cec Cooper	Brian Davies	
1960⁑	1960	—N/a	—N/a	5th	11	7	0	Lost semi final	1	2	Eddie Burns	Brian Davies	
1961⁑	1961	—N/a	—N/a	8th	6	11	1	DNQ			Eddie Burns	Ray Gartner	
1962⁑	1962	—N/a	—N/a	6th	7	9	2	DNQ			Eddie Burns	Ray Beavan & Brian Davies	
1963⁑	1963	—N/a	—N/a	8th	6	11	1	DNQ			Clive Churchill	Ray Gartner	
1964⁑	1964	—N/a	—N/a	10th†	1	16	1	DNQ			Clive Churchill	Les Johns	
1965⁑	1965	—N/a	—N/a	9th	5	13	0	DNQ			Eddie Burns	Leo Toohey	
1966⁑	1966	—N/a	—N/a	8th	8	10	0	DNQ			Roger Pearman → George Taylforth	Roger Pearman → George Taylforth	
1967⁑	1967	—N/a	—N/a	3rd	14	7	1	Runners-up	2	1	Kevin Ryan	Kevin Ryan	
1968⁑	1968	—N/a	—N/a	9th	9	12	1	DNQ			Kevin Ryan	Kevin Ryan	
1969⁑	1969	—N/a	—N/a	8th	10	12	0	DNQ			Kevin Ryan	Kevin Ryan	
1970⁑	1970	—N/a	—N/a	4th	14	8	0	Lost semi final	0	1	Kevin Ryan	Ron Raper	
1971⁑	1971	—N/a	—N/a	6th	11	11	0	DNQ			Bob Hagan	Johnny Greaves	
1972⁑	1972	—N/a	—N/a	6th	12	10	0	DNQ			Bob Hagan	Johnny Greaves	
1973⁑	1973	—N/a	—N/a	5th	12	10	0	Lost qualifying final	0	1	Malcolm Clift	Geoff Connell	
1974⁑	1974	—N/a	QF	3rd	13	9	0	Runners-up	2	1	Malcolm Clift	John McDonell	
1975⁑	1975	—N/a	Rd	4th	11	9	0	Lost semi final	0	1	Malcolm Clift	Tim Pickup	
1976⁑	1976	—N/a	SF	5th	12	7	3	Lost preliminary final	2	1	Malcolm Clift	Bob McCarthy	
1977⁑	1977	—N/a	SF	7th	10	11	1	DNQ			Malcolm Clift	Bob McCarthy	
1978⁑	1978	—N/a	Rd	5th	13	7	2	Lost qualifying final	0	1	Ted Glossop	George Peponis	
1979⁑	1979	—N/a	Grp	5th	13	9	0	Runners-up	3	1	Ted Glossop	George Peponis	
1980⁑	1980	—N/a	QF	2nd	15	7	0	Premiers	3	0	Ted Glossop	George Peponis	
1981⁑	1981	—N/a	QF	10th	8	14	0	DNQ			Ted Glossop	George Peponis	
1982⁑	1982	—N/a	Rd	9th	12	11	3	DNQ			Ted Glossop	George Peponis	
1983⁑	1983	—N/a	QF	3rd	18	8	0	Lost preliminary final	1	2	Ted Glossop	Chris Anderson	
1984⁑	1984	—N/a	QF	1st‡	19	5	0	Premiers	2	0	Warren Ryan	Steve Mortimer	
1985⁑	1985	—N/a	QF	3rd	16	6	2	Premiers	3	1	Warren Ryan	Steve Mortimer	
1986⁑	1986	—N/a	QF	3rd	15	8	1	Runners-up	2	2	Warren Ryan	Steve Mortimer	
1987⁑	1987	—N/a	QF	6th	13	11	0	DNQ			Warren Ryan	Steve Mortimer	
1988⁑	1988	—N/a	Rd	2nd	16	6	0	Premiers	3	0	Phil Gould	Peter Tunks	
1989⁑	1989	—N/a	QF	9th	10	10	2	DNQ			Phil Gould	Peter Tunks	
1990⁑	1990	—N/a	Rd	7th	12	9	1	DNQ			Chris Anderson	Terry Lamb	
1991⁑	1991	—N/a	Semi	5th	13	8	1	Lost playoff	0	1	Chris Anderson	Terry Lamb	
1992⁑	1992	—N/a	Rd	7th	10	10	2	DNQ			Chris Anderson	Terry Lamb	
1993⁑	1993	—N/a	QF	1st‡	17	5	0	Lost preliminary final	0	2	Chris Anderson	Terry Lamb	
1994⁑	1994	—N/a	Rd	1st‡	18	4	0	Runners-up	1	1	Chris Anderson	Terry Lamb	
1995#	1995	—N/a	Semi	6th	14	8	0	Premiers	4	0	Chris Anderson	Terry Lamb	
1996#	1996	—N/a	—N/a	10th	11	10	0	DNQ			Chris Anderson	Simon Gillies	
1997~	1997	Pool	—N/a	4th	10	8	0	Lost preliminary semi final	0	1	Chris Anderson	Simon Gillies	
1998	1998	—N/a	—N/a	10th	13	11	0	Runners-up	4	1	Steve Folkes	Darren Britt	
1999	1999	—N/a	—N/a	5th	15	8	1	Lost semi final	1	1	Steve Folkes	Darren Britt	
2000	2000	—N/a	—N/a	11th	10	15	1	DNQ			Steve Folkes	Darren Britt	
2001	2001	—N/a	—N/a	2nd	17	6	3	Lost semi final	0	2	Steve Folkes	Darren Britt	
2002	2002	—N/a	—N/a	15th† (Note: The Bulldogs were deducted 37 premiership points due to gross salary cap breaches)	20	3	1	DNQ			Steve Folkes	Steven Price	
2003	2003	—N/a	—N/a	3rd	16	8	0	Lost preliminary final	1	2	Steve Folkes	Steven Price	
2004	2004	—N/a	—N/a	2nd	19	5	0	Premiers	3	1	Steve Folkes	Steven Price	
2005	2005	Lost	—N/a	12th	9	14	1	DNQ			Steve Folkes	Andrew Ryan	
2006	2006	—N/a	—N/a	2nd	16	8	0	Lost preliminary final	1	1	Steve Folkes	Andrew Ryan	
2007	2007	—N/a	—N/a	6th	12	12	0	Lost semi final	0	2	Steve Folkes	Andrew Ryan	
2008	2008	—N/a	—N/a	16th†	5	19	0	DNQ			Steve Folkes	Andrew Ryan	
2009	2009	—N/a	—N/a	2nd	18	6	0	Lost preliminary final	1	1	Kevin Moore	Andrew Ryan	
2010	2010	—N/a	—N/a	13th	9	15	0	DNQ			Kevin Moore	Andrew Ryan	
2011	2011	—N/a	—N/a	9th	12	12	0	DNQ			Kevin Moore → Jim Dymock	Andrew Ryan	
2012	2012	—N/a	—N/a	1st‡	18	6	0	Runners-up	2	1	Des Hasler	Michael Ennis	
2013	2013	—N/a	—N/a	6th	13	11	0	Lost qualifying final	0	1	Des Hasler	Michael Ennis	
2014	2014	—N/a	—N/a	7th	13	11	0	Runners-up	3	1	Des Hasler	Michael Ennis & Frank Pritchard	
2015	2015	—N/a	—N/a	5th	14	10	0	Lost semi final	1	1	Des Hasler	James Graham	
2016	2016	—N/a	—N/a	7th	14	10	0	Lost qualifying final	0	1	Des Hasler	James Graham	
2017	2017	—N/a	—N/a	11th	10	14	0	DNQ			Des Hasler	James Graham	
2018	2018	—N/a	—N/a	12th	8	16	0	DNQ			Dean Pay	Josh Jackson	
2019	2019	—N/a	—N/a	12th	10	14	0	DNQ			Dean Pay	Josh Jackson	
2020	2020	—N/a	—N/a	15th	3	17	0	DNQ			Dean Pay → Steve Georgallis	Josh Jackson	
2021	2021	—N/a	—N/a	16th†	3	21	0	DNQ			Trent Barrett	Josh Jackson	
2022	2022	—N/a	—N/a	12th	7	17	0	DNQ			Trent Barrett → Michael Potter	Josh Jackson	
2023	2023	—N/a	13th	15th	7	17	0	DNQ			Cameron Ciraldo	Matt Burton & Reed Mahoney	
2024	2024	—N/a	9th	6th	14	10	0	Lost elimination final	0	1	Cameron Ciraldo	Stephen Crichton	
2025	2025	—N/a	13th	3rd	16	8	0	Lost semi final	0	2	Cameron Ciraldo	Stephen Crichton	
2026	2026	—N/a	6th	12th	11	13	0	DNQ			Cameron Ciraldo	Stephen Crichton	

=== NRL under-20s ===
Table key
‡	Club finished regular season in first position
†	Club finished regular season in last position (wooden spoon)
DNQ	Club did not qualify for finals

Table of yearly win–loss records, with finals results, and key personnel
Season	Club	Regular season				Finals results			Coach	Ref
Season	Club	Pos.	W	L	D	Final position	W	L	Coach	Ref
2008	2008	7th	12	9	3	Lost qualifying final	0	1	Andy Patmore	
2009	2009	11th	9	14	1	DNQ			Andy Patmore	
2010	2010	3rd	15	7	2	Lost preliminary final	2	1	Andy Patmore	
2011	2011	6th	14	10	0	Lost qualifying final	0	1	Andy Patmore	
2012	2012	1st‡	17	6	1	Lost semi final	0	2	Andy Patmore	
2013	2013	4th	16	7	1	Lost preliminary final	1	1	Andy Patmore	
2014	2014	16th†	3	21	0	DNQ			Andy Patmore → Scott Murray	
2015	2015	10th	9	13	2	DNQ			Scott Murray	
2016	2016	11th	9	14	1	DNQ			Ben Anderson	
2017	2017	14th	6	15	3	DNQ			Brad Henderson	

=== NRL women's ===
Table of yearly win–loss records, with finals results, and key personnel
Season	Club	Regular season				Finals results			Coach	Captain(s)	Ref
Season	Club	Pos.	W	L	D	Final position	W	L	Coach	Captain(s)	Ref
2025	2025	9th	3	7	1	DNQ			~~Blake Cavallaro~~ (Note: After being appointed in May 2024, Blake Cavallaro resigned as coach before the start of the 2025 season.) → Brayden Wiliame	Tayla Preston & Angelina Teakaraanga-Katoa	
2026	2026	11th	3	8	0	DNQ			Brayden Wiliame	Tayla Preston & Angelina Teakaraanga-Katoa	
