= List of Canterbury-Bankstown Bulldogs coaches =

There have been 38 head coaches of the Bulldogs club since their introduction into top-grade rugby league competition in 1935. Of these, most were full-time coaches, but six of them filled a captain-coach role while playing for the team.

== List of coaches ==
Updated as of the end of the 2025 NRL season

Key to list
	Member of National Rugby League Hall of Fame
†	Player coach

First Grade coaches
No.	Coach	Career	Games	Wins	Losses	Draws	Win %
1	(Australia) Tedda Courtney	1935	16	2	14	0	12.5%
2	(Australia) Frank Burge	1936	15	9	4	2	60.0%
3	(Australia) George Mason	1937	8	4	4	0	50.0%
4	(Australia) Jimmy Craig	1938	16	13	1	2	81.3%
5	(Australia) Jerry Brien	1939, 1942	32	22	10	0	68.8%
6	(Australia) Alan Brady	1940†	16	9	7	0	56.3%
7	(Australia) Ron Bailey	1941†, 1944†	22	11	11	0	50.0%
8	(Australia) Roy Kirkaldy	1943†	14	3	11	0	21.4%
9	(Australia) Cec Fifield	1944	9	3	5	1	33.3%
10	(Australia) Bill Kelly	1945	14	4	9	1	28.6%
11	(Australia) Ross McKinnon	1946–1947	37	23	12	2	62.2%
12	(Australia) Arthur Halloway	1948	18	7	9	2	38.9%
13	(Australia) Henry Porter	1949	18	6	10	2	33.3%
14	(Australia) Alby Why	1950, 1951–1952	48	18	29	1	37.5%
15	(Australia) Vic Bulgin	1951†	6	3	3	0	50.0%
16	(Australia) Jack Hampstead	1953–1954	36	13	21	2	36.1%
17	(Australia) Vic Hey	1955–1956	36	10	26	0	27.8%
18	(Australia) Col Geelan	1957†	18	3	14	1	16.7%
19	(Australia) Cec Cooper	1958–1959	36	9	25	2	25.0%
20	(Australia) Eddie Burns	1960–1962, 1965	75	30	42	3	40.0%
21	(Australia) Clive Churchill	1963–1964	36	7	27	2	19.4%
22	(England) Roger Pearman	1966	18	8	10	0	44.4%
23	(Australia) Kevin Ryan	1967–1970†	92	49	41	2	53.3%
24	(Australia) Bob Hagan	1971–1972	44	23	21	0	52.3%
25	(Australia) Malcolm Clift	1973–1977	118	62	49	7	52.5%
26	(Australia) Ted Glossop	1978–1983	151	86	60	5	57.0%
27	(Australia) Warren Ryan	1984–1987	106	70	33	3	66.0%
28	(Australia) Phil Gould	1988–1989	47	29	16	2	61.7%
29	(Australia) Chris Anderson	1990–1997	181	110	67	4	60.8%
30	(Australia) Steve Folkes	1998–2008	289	172	130	7	59.5%
31	(Australia) Kevin Moore	2009–2011	66	35	31	0	53.0%
32	(Australia) Jim Dymock	2011	8	5	3	0	62.5%
33	(Australia) Des Hasler	2012–2017	155	88	67	0	56.8%
34	(Australia) Dean Pay	2018–2020	57	19	38	0	33.3%
35	(Australia) Steve Georgallis	2020	11	2	9	0	18.2%
36	(Australia) Trent Barrett	2021−2022	34	5	29	0	14.7%
37	(Australia) Michael Potter	2022	14	5	9	0	35.7%
38	(Australia) Cameron Ciraldo	2023−present	75	37	38	0	49.3%

Note: Includes World Club Challenge matches.

== See also ==
- List of current NRL coaches
- List of current NRL Women's coaches
