= 1942 NSWRFL season =

Rugby league competition

1942 New South Wales Rugby Football League
- Teams: 8
- Premiers: Canterbury-Bankstown (2nd title)
- Minor premiers: Canterbury-Bankstown (2nd title)
- Matches played: 61
- Points scored: 1895
- Top points scorer(s): Ray Lindwall (143)
- Wooden spoon: Western Suburbs (8th spoon)
- Top try-scorer(s): Jack Lindwall (16)

The 1942 New South Wales Rugby Football League premiership was the thirty-fifth season of Sydney's top-level rugby league football competition, Australia's first. Eight teams from across the city contested the premiership during the season, which lasted from May until September, culminating in the Canterbury-Bankstown club's grand final victory over St. George.

== Teams ==
- Balmain, formed on 23 January 1908 at Balmain Town Hall
- Canterbury-Bankstown
- Eastern Suburbs, formed on 24 January 1908 at Paddington Town Hall
- Newtown, formed on 14 January 1908
- North Sydney, formed on 7 February 1908
- South Sydney, formed on 17 January 1908 at Redfern Town Hall
- St. George, formed on 8 November 1920 at Kogarah School of Arts
- Western Suburbs, formed on 4 February 1908

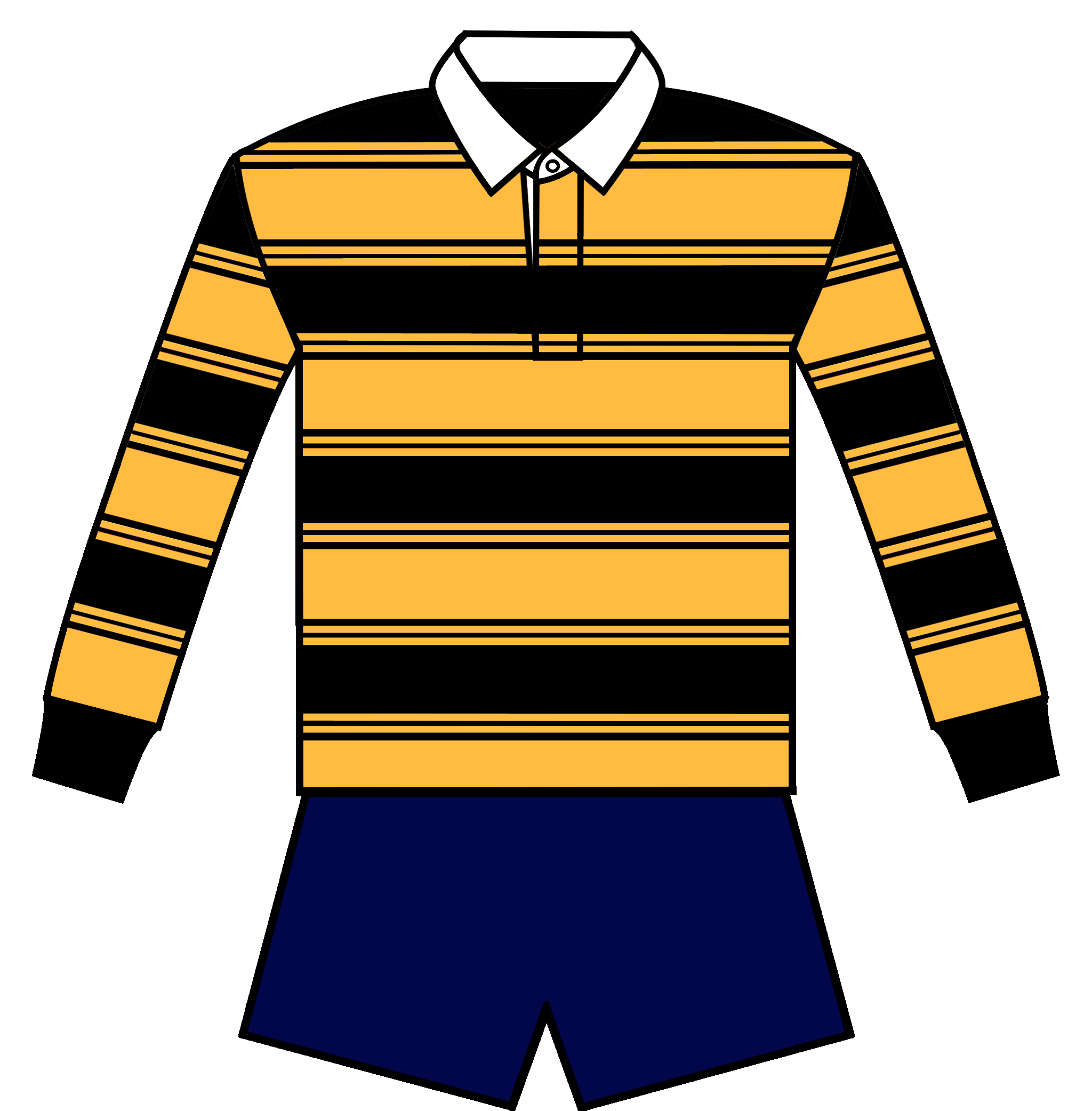
Balmain 35th season Ground: Birchgrove Oval; Coach: Bill Kelly; Captain: Dawson Buckley

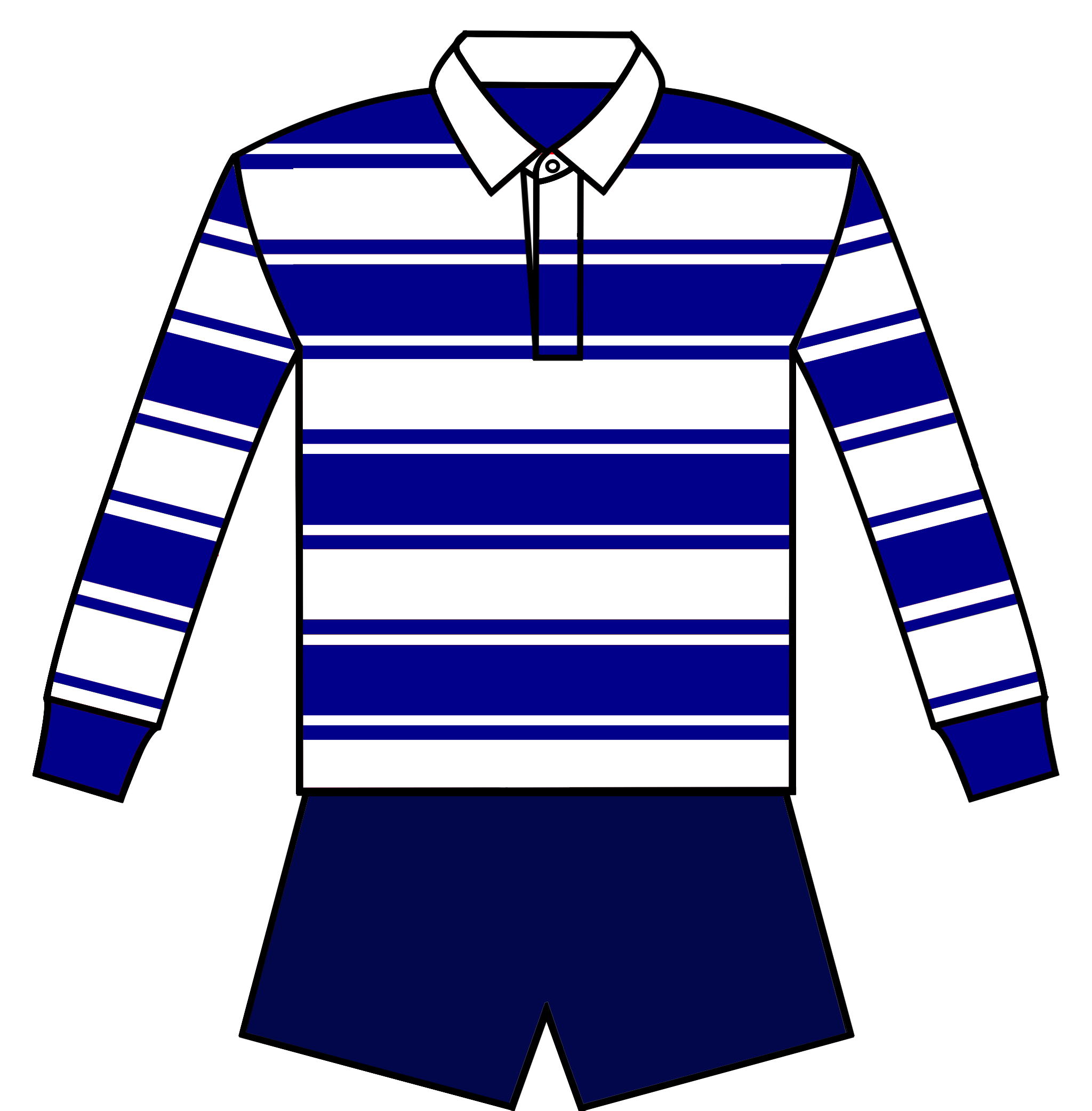
Canterbury-Bankstown 8th season Ground: Belmore Sports Ground; Coach: Jerry Brien; Captain: Ron Bailey

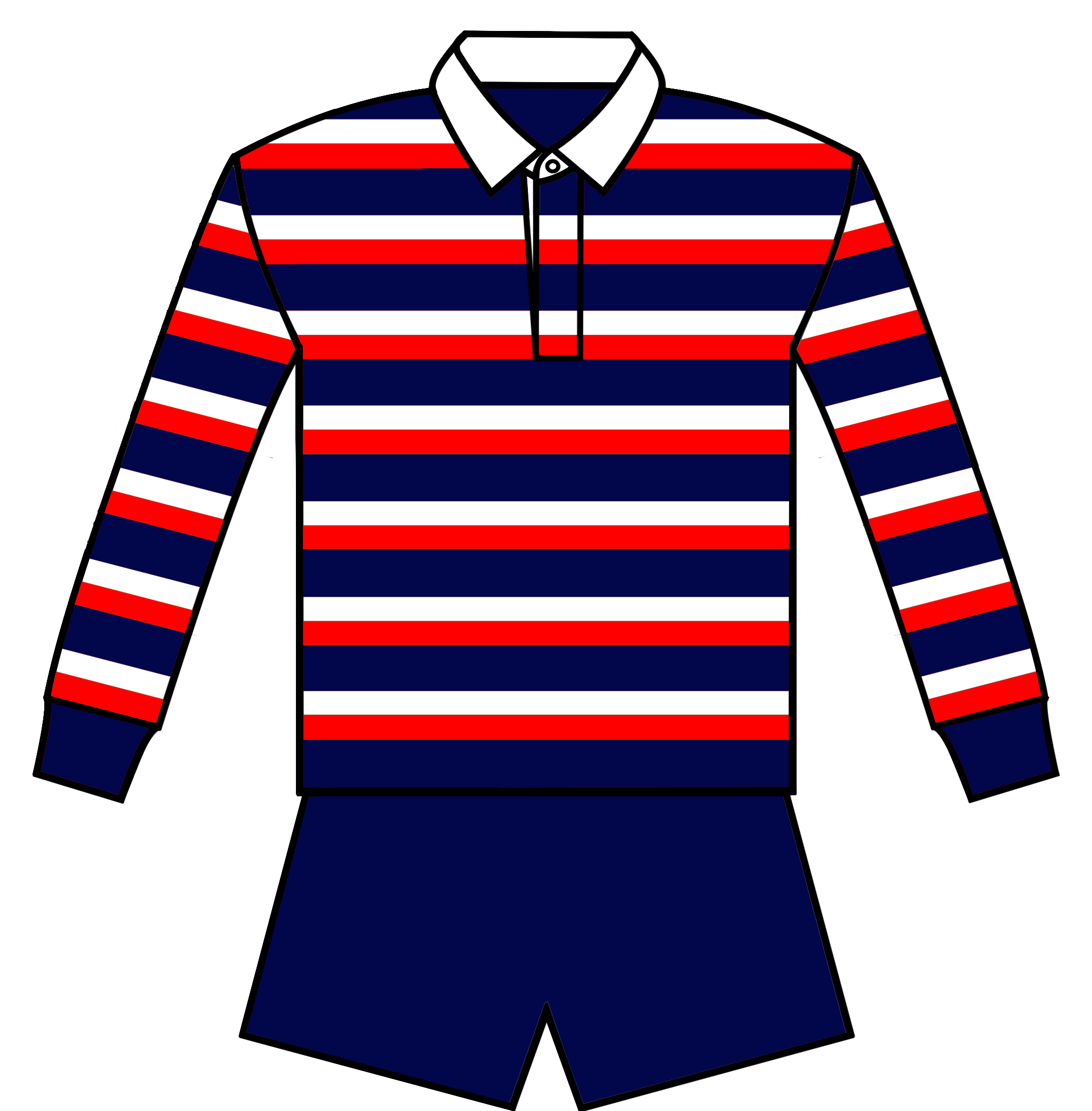
Eastern Suburbs 35th season Ground: Sydney Sports Ground; Coach: Joe Pearce; Captain: Ray Stehr

Newtown 35th season Ground: Henson Park; Coach: Arthur Folwell; Captain: Tom Kirk

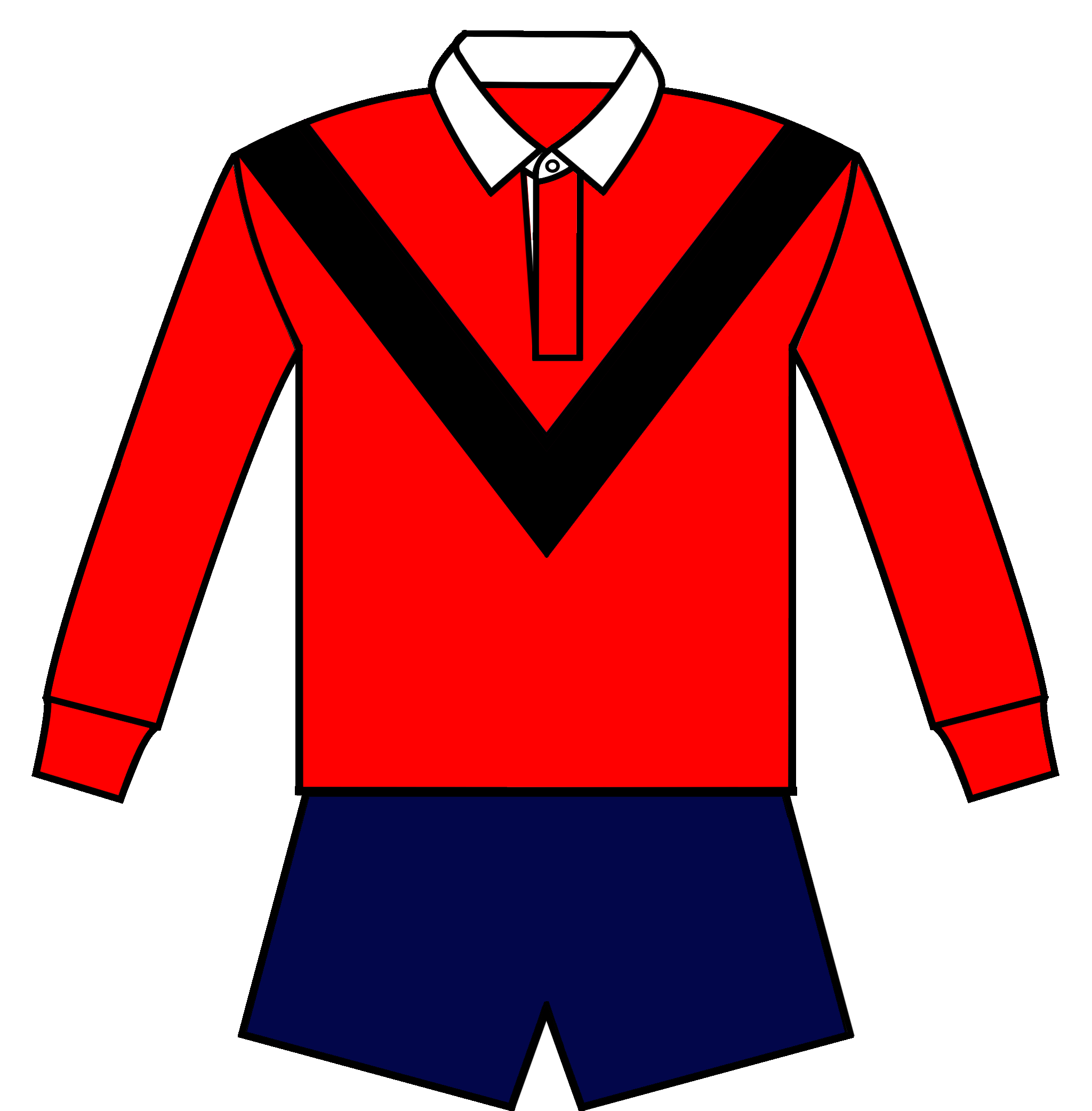
North Sydney 35th season Ground: North Sydney Oval; Coach: Jack O'Reilly; Captain: Rex Harrison

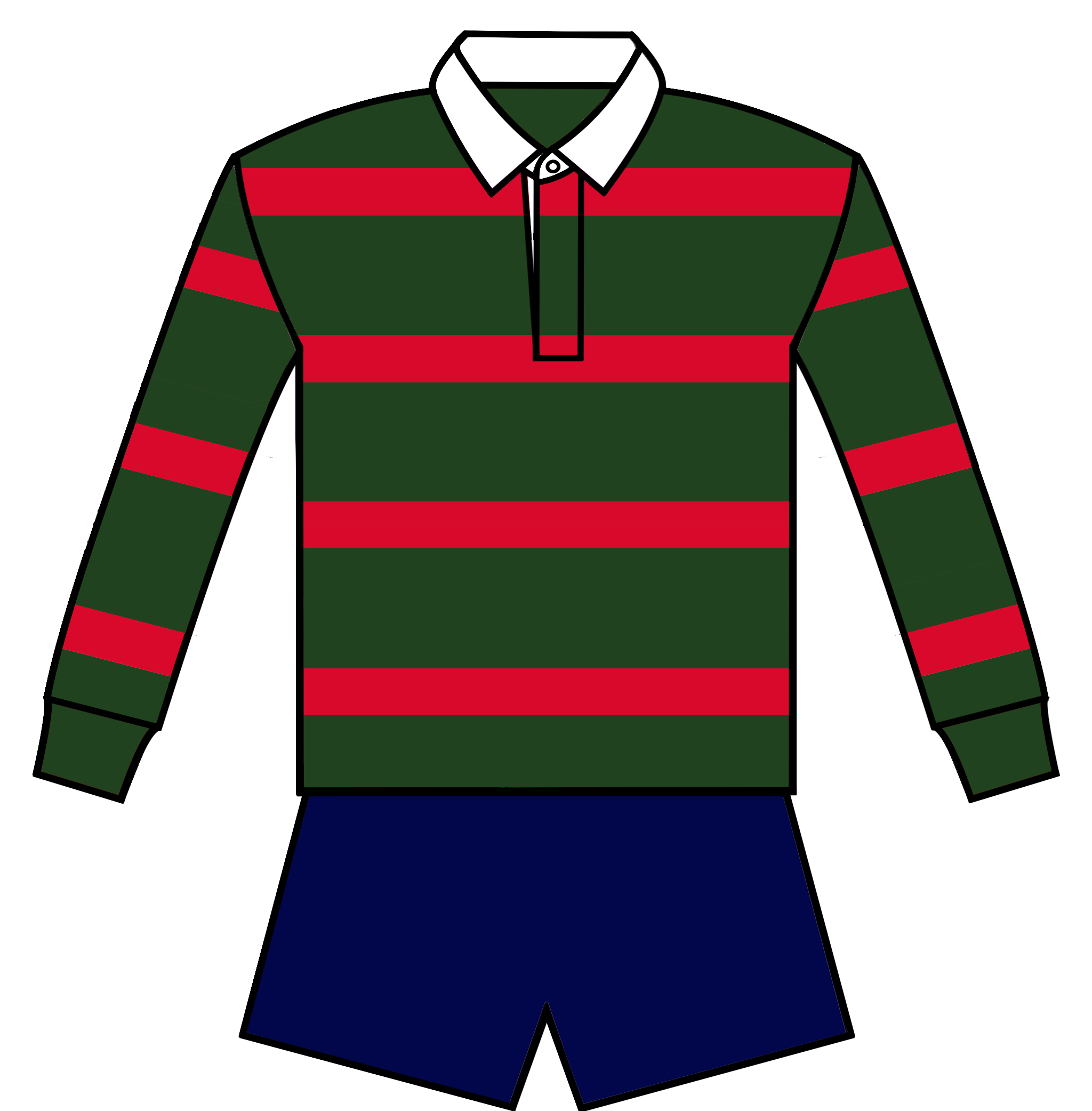
South Sydney 35th season Ground: Sydney Sports Ground; Coach: Jim Tait; Captain: Fred Felsch

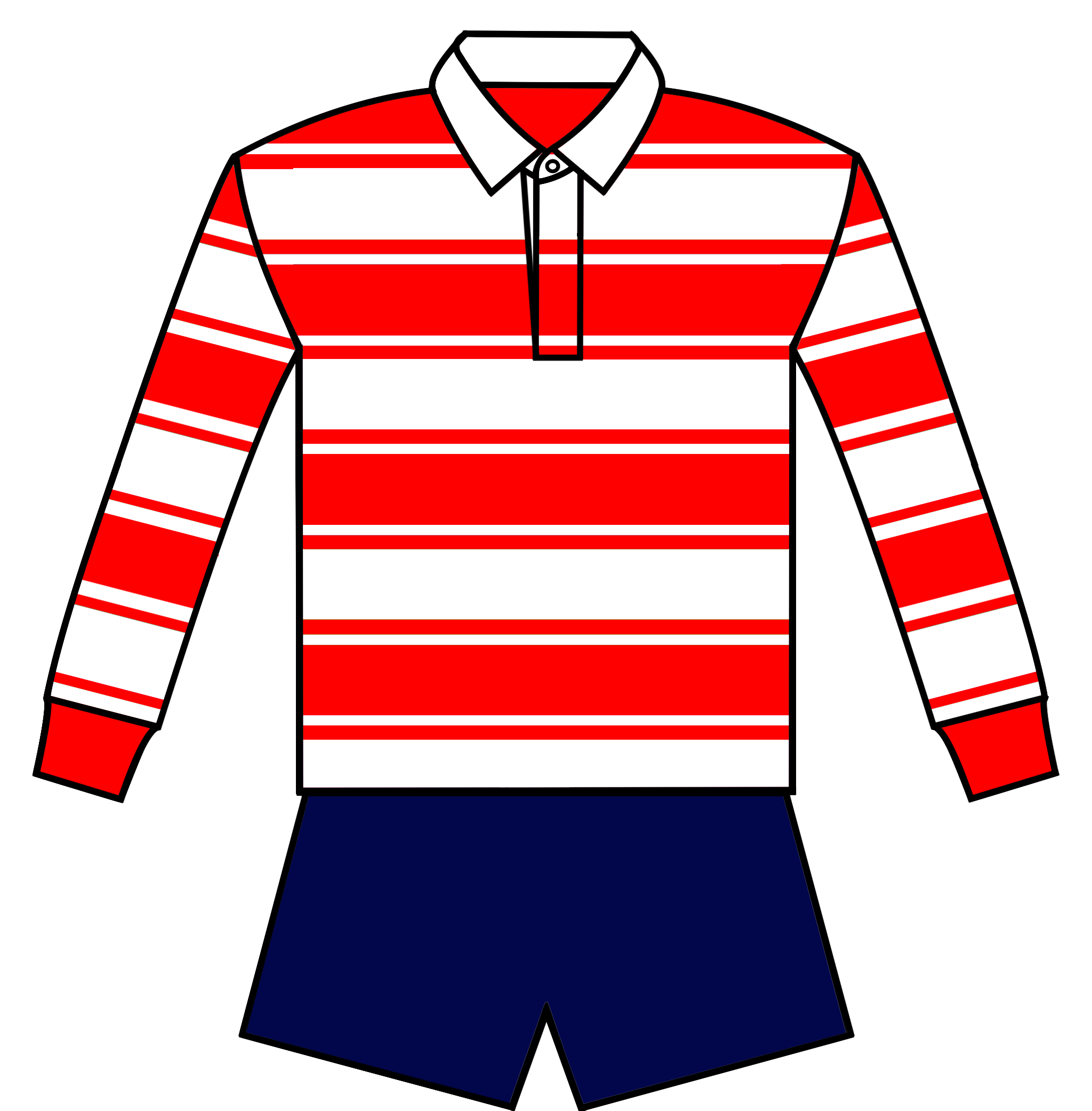
St. George 22nd season Ground: Hurstville Oval; Captain-coach: Len Kelly

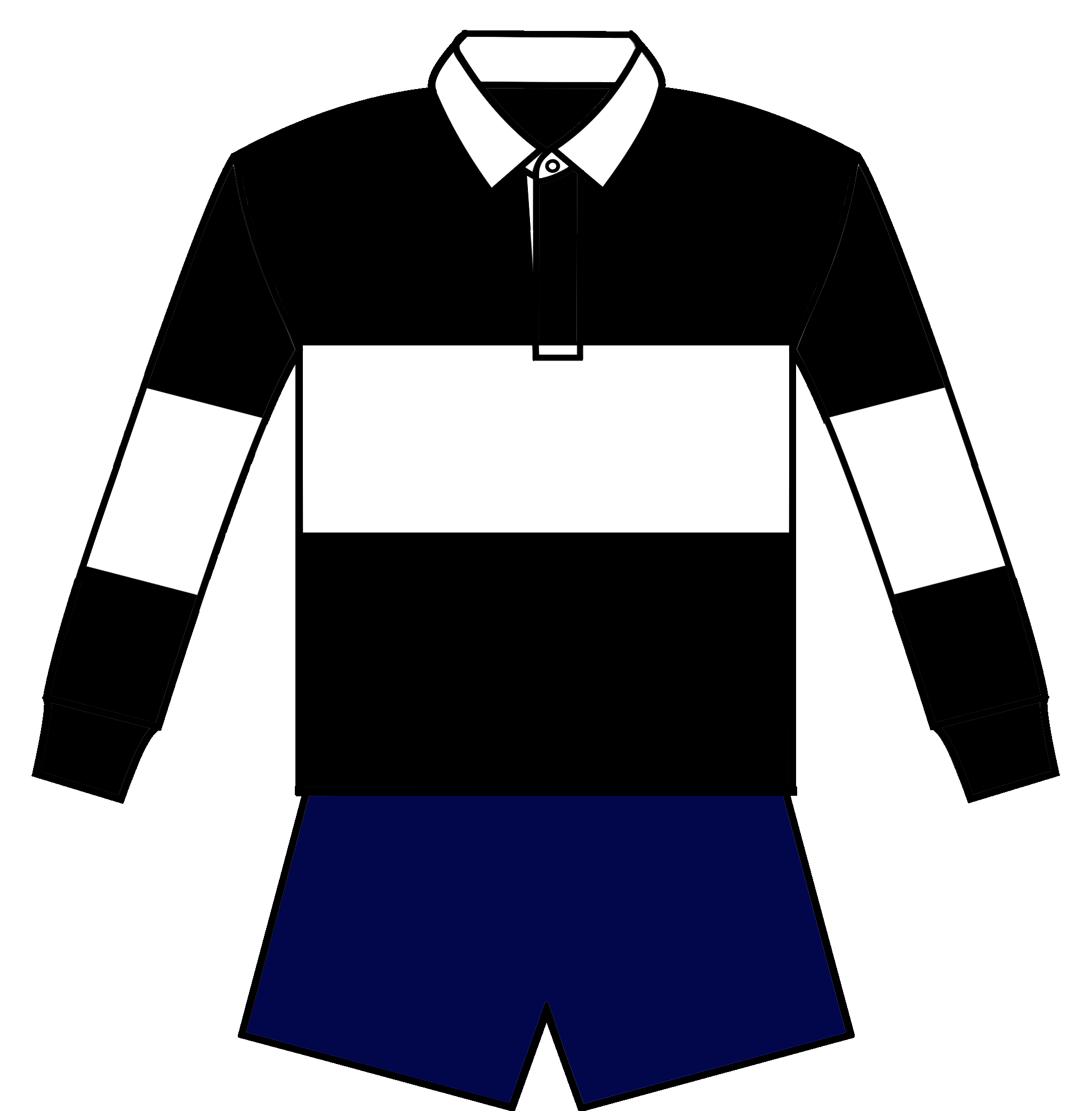
Western Suburbs 35th season Ground: St Lukes Oval; Captain-Coach: Albert McGuinness

== Ladder ==
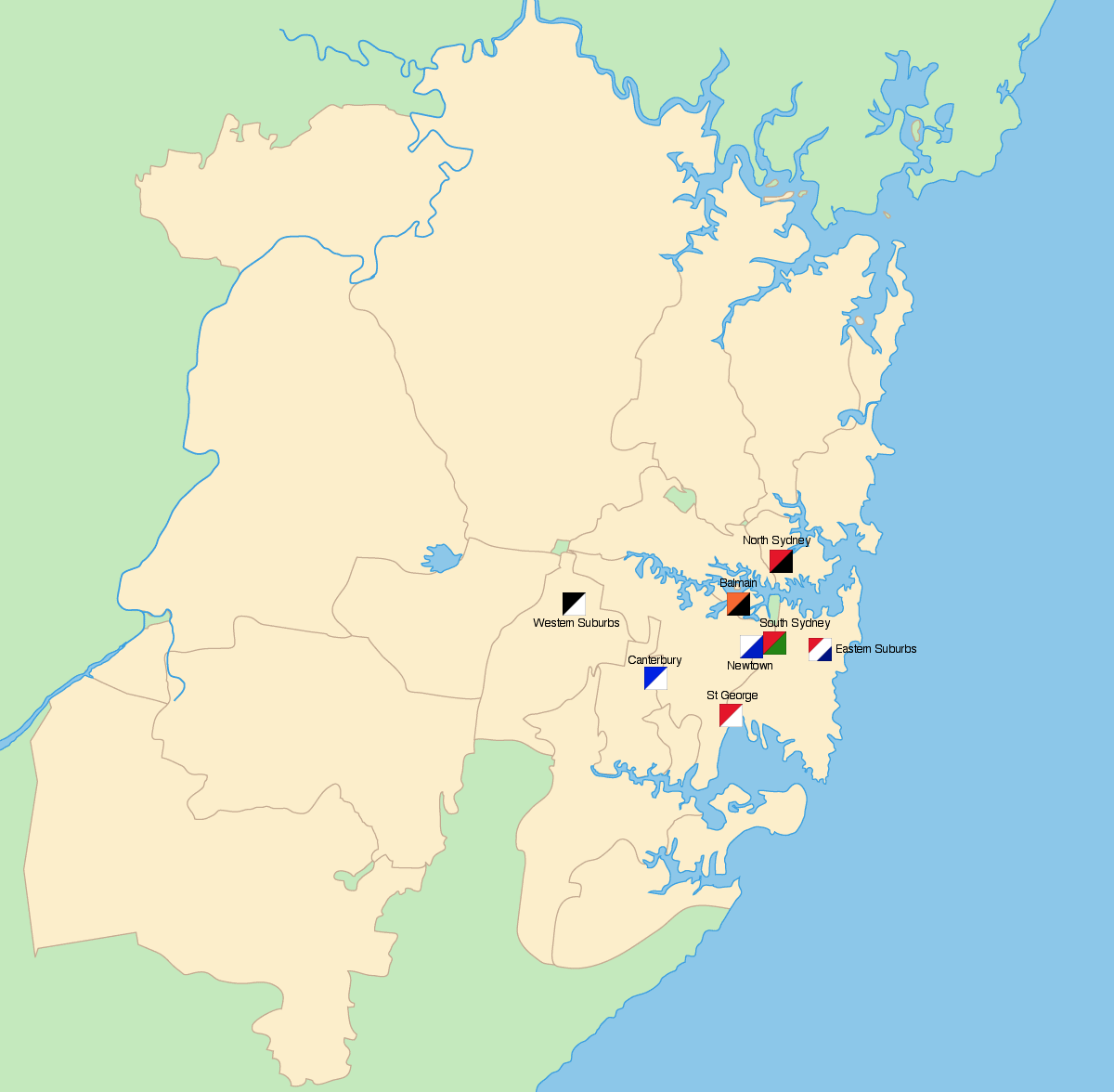
The geographical locations of the teams that contested the 1942 premiership across Sydney.

	Team	Pld	W	D	L	PF	PA	PD	Pts
1	Canterbury	14	10	0	4	264	162	+102	20
2	Balmain	14	10	0	4	223	192	+31	20
3	St. George	14	9	0	5	271	205	+66	18
4	Eastern Suburbs	14	8	0	6	213	214	-1	16
5	South Sydney	14	7	1	6	209	191	+18	15
6	North Sydney	14	5	0	9	220	216	+4	10
7	Newtown	14	4	1	9	189	266	-77	9
8	Western Suburbs	14	2	0	12	148	291	-143	4

== Finals ==
The minor premiership was won by Canterbury-Bankstown in a play off against Balmain after both sides had finished the season on twenty points.

In the semi-finals, Canterbury-Bankstown lost their match to St. George whilst Eastern Suburbs, who only just made the finals after South Sydney had drawn their match in the final round of the season, defeated Balmain. The result of the first semi final meant that St. George and Eastern Suburbs played a preliminary final which would decide who met minor premiers Canterbury-Bankstown in the Grand Final. St. George won the match, as they had done four weeks earlier over Easts in the final round of the season proper.

St. George had won two matches in the semis while Canterbury had just one victory, but the Berries were guaranteed a Grand Final berth under a call back of the old rules giving the minor premiers a right of challenge. In the Grand Final, Canterbury-Bankstown narrowly defeated St. George to collect their second premiership victory.

Home	Score	Away	Match information
Home	Score	Away	Date and time	Venue	Referee	Crowd
Playoff
Canterbury-Bankstown	26–20	Balmain	15 August 1942	Sydney Cricket Ground		17,300
Semifinals
Canterbury-Bankstown	10–25	St. George	22 August 1942	Sydney Cricket Ground	Jack O'Brien	26,467
Balmain	14–20	Eastern Suburbs	29 August 1942	Sydney Cricket Ground	Jack O'Brien	19,782
Preliminary Final
St. George	18–5	Eastern Suburbs	5 September 1942	Sydney Cricket Ground	Jack O'Brien	30,858
Grand Final
Canterbury-Bankstown	11–9	St. George	12 September 1942	Sydney Cricket Ground	Jack O'Brien	26,171

== Grand Final ==
1942 NSWRFL Grand Final

Canterbury-Bankstown	St George
11	9
	1	2	Total
CBY	7	4	11
STG	7	2	9
- Date: 12 September 1942
- Stadium: Sydney Cricket Ground
- Location: Sydney
- Referee: Jack O'Brien
- Attendance: 26,071

Broadcast partners

=== Teams ===
Canterbury's Roy McCarter was ruled out of the match after he injured his collarbone three weeks before the match, in his place Jack Bonnyman was selected at halfback.

Canterbury and St George had played four times against each other 1942 with Canterbury winning the first two matches during the premiership season, while St George won the next two matches in both the City Cup and the finals. St George entered the match as strong favourites with pundits suggesting their forward pack would win the day.

Team details
Canterbury-Bankstown		Position	St George
Name	Number	Position	Number	Name
Lindsay Johnson	13	FB	13	Ray Lindwall
Edgar Newham	12	WG	10	Doug McRitchie
Ron Bailey (c)	9	CE	29	Ted McHugh
Ron Knight	31	CE	12	Noel Jones
Bob Jackson	14	WG	17	Jack Lindwall
Tom Ezart	34	FE	53	Cedric Turvey
Jack Bonnyman	10	HB	20	Eric Laurence
Henry Porter	3	PR	3	Charlie Montgomery
Roy Kirkaldy	15	HK	1	Herb Gilbert Jnr
Eddie Burns	1	PF	5	Bill McRitchie
George Elley	4	SR	43	Alister Clarke
Bob Farrar	5	SR	4	Len Kelly (captain-coach)
Frank Sponberg	17	LK	26	Bill Collier
Jerry Brien		Coach

=== Match details ===
The Sydney Cricket Ground was a muddy quagmire with a treacherous patch in the centre which kept the teams evenly matched and the crowd in a fever of excitement until the final whistle. Newspaper reports recorded that 7,000 of the crowd on the hill had jumped the fence during the reserve grade final and invaded the half-empty new member's stand. Towards the end of the first grade match 5,000 people crowded onto the touchline and referee O'Brien had to hold up play until officials were able to get them back twenty yards.

Canterbury's defence was tested during a torrid ten-minute period when St. George hurled themselves at the line from never more than eight yards away. The Berries defence held and the Dragons could not break through.

The Canterbury-Bankstown tactics were to keep the game with the forwards and away from the St George backs. Canterbury hooker Roy Kirkaldy won vital scrums. Bob Farrar, Frank Sponberg and Henry Porter were tireless with Porter's handling and kicking skills on display.

Canterbury Lindsay Johnson opened the scoring taking a penalty goal from an acute angle, while St George fullback Ray Lindwall gave St George their first points converting a penalty goal attempt from near halfway.

Turning defence into attack, Canterbury captain Ron Bailey fielded a St George kick close to his own line and drew in two defenders before slinging the ball out to Bob Jackson. The winger dashed more than 75 yards to beat a despairing dive from Ray Lindwall to score. Johnson converted the try to give Canterbury a 7–2 lead.

Saints were able to level the scores before half time through a try to Jack Lindwall after Jackson had been unable to field a cross-field kick. Jack Lindwall picking the ball up and scoring adjacent to the goal posts. Ray Lindwall converted the try.

In the second half St George pressured the Canterbury line and looked to have gone ahead, but Saints captain-coach Len Kelly was held up over the try line and pushed back into the field of play. They would take the lead instead through another penalty goal to Ray Lindwall.

Two penalty goals to Canterbury's Lindsay Johnson put them in front at the final whistle. Johnson's final goal came after he was illegally tackled and his attempt at goal just scraped over the cross bar to give his team the premiership.

=== Scoreboard ===
1942 NSWRFL Grand Final

Saturday, 12 September
15:15 AEST (UTC+10)

Canterbury-Bankstown Bulldogs	11 – 9	St. George
Tries: 1 Jackson; Goals: 4 Johnson pen', conv', pen', pen'	1st: 7–7; 2nd: 4–2	Tries: 1 J Lindwall; Goals: 3 R Lindwall pen', conv', pen'

Sydney Cricket Ground
Attendance: 26,071
Referee: Jack O'Brien
Touch judges: E. Fletcher, J. Bates

=== Other matches ===
In the reserve grade Grand Final, North Sydney defeated St George 15–5. It was North Sydney's second reserve grade premiership.

== Player statistics ==
The following statistics are as of the conclusion of Round 14.

Top 5 point scorers

Points	Player	Tries	Goals	Field Goals
115	Ray Lindwall	1	56	0
92	Fred Felsch	6	37	0
67	Dick Dunn	3	29	0
63	Rex Harrison	3	27	0
48	Lin Johnson	0	24	0

Top 5 try scorers

Tries	Player
14	Jack Lindwall
13	Arthur Patton
10	Eddie Burns
9	Gerald Scully
8	Lin McLean

Top 5 goal scorers

Goals	Player
56	Ray Lindwall
37	Fred Felsch
29	Dick Dunn
27	Rex Harrison
24	Lin Johnson
