= Lindwall =

Lindwall is a surname. Notable people with the surname include:

- Jack Lindwall (1918–2000), Australian rugby league footballer
- Orvar Lindwall (1941–2025), Swedish épée fencer
- Ray Lindwall (1921–1996), Australian cricketer
