= Eric Lawrence =

Australian rugby league footballer

Personal information
- Full name: Eric Sinclair Maxwell Lawrence
- Born: 15 July 1924; Grafton, New South Wales, Australia
- Died: 13 July 1978 (aged 53); Grafton, New South Wales, Australia

Playing information
- Position: Halfback
Club
Years	Team	Pld	T	G	FG	P
1942	St. George	3	0	0	0	0

Eric Sinclair Maxwell Lawrence (15 July 1924 – 13 July 1978) was an Australian rugby league footballer who played in the 1940s.

A South Grafton junior, Lawrence was in the St. George District during 1942 and turned out for the St. George club for a few games in that season. He replaced the first grade half-back Alf Cox due to a broken collarbone, in the 1942 Grand Final. He played a total of three first grade games during 1942, and did not appear in first grade again due to war duties. He later returned to his local area after the war and went on to star for the South Grafton Rugby League club between 1946-1956 and represented Upper Clarence during his playing career.

Note: His surname was often spelt incorrectly in the press as 'Laurence'.

South Grafton Rugby League Club named Eric Lawrence in their team of the Century in 2014.
