= Tom Ezart =

Australian rugby league player

Personal information
- Full name: Thomas Robert Ezart
- Born: 18 September 1914 Port Kembla, New South Wales, Australia
- Died: 23 May 1977 (aged 62) Wollongong, New South Wales, Australia

Playing information
- Position: Five-eighth
Club
Years	Team	Pld	T	G	FG	P
1942–49	Canterbury-Bankstown	17	4	0	0	12

Thomas Robert Ezart (1914-1977) was an Australian rugby league footballer who played in the 1940s. He played his football in Country New South Wales as well as in Sydney at the Canterbury-Bankstown club with whom he won the 1942 NSWRFL Premiership.

== Playing career ==
A Port Kembla junior, Ezart played representative football for the Illawarra Rugby League before moving to Sydney and joining the eight-year-old Canterbury-Bankstown club in 1942 and that year helping them to their second premiership. Military service for World War II curtailed his football career, but he resumed playing and coaching in Wollongong and was selected to captain an Illawarra representative team against the visiting 1946 Great Britain Lions. Ezart also made a brief reappearance with the Canterbury-Bankstown club during the 1949 NSWRFL season before retiring from first grade rugby league.

== Post playing ==
He later became a referee and a Canterbury club selector.

On 12 February 1968, Ezart was elected as one of the Australian national team selectors for the upcoming 1968 World Cup campaign.

Ezart died on 23 May 1977.

Ezrt was a life member of the Illawarra Rugby League, and in 2011, the centenary year of the League, he was one of the nominees for the five-eighth position in the Illawarra team of the century, but eventually was overlooked in favour of Bob Fulton.
