= Len Kelly =

Australian RL coach and former rugby league footballer

- Len Kelly. St.George vice captain 1941

Personal information
- Full name: Leonard Thomas Kelly
- Born: 17 June 1913 Manildra, New South Wales, Australia
- Died: 3 November 1981 (aged 68) Arncliffe, New South Wales, Australia

Playing information
- Position: Second-row
Club
Years	Team	Pld	T	G	FG	P
1933–44	St. George	160	59	0	0	177

Coaching information
Club
Years	Team	Gms	W	D	L	W%
1942	St. George	20	13	0	7	65

Leonard Thomas Kelly (1913–1981) was an Australian premiership winning rugby league player who played in the 1930s and 1940s with St. George. He was later a senior administrator with the club in their successive eleven year winning run from 1956 to 1966.

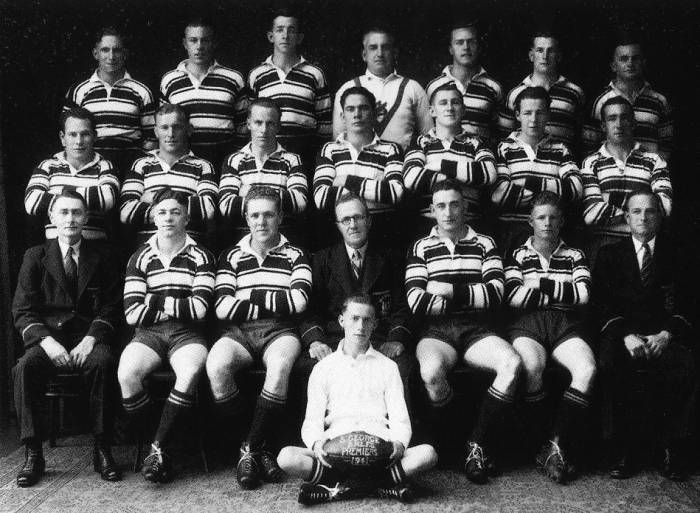
Kelly (seated 3rd from right) in St. George's 1941 premiership-winning team

== Background ==
Kelly was born in Manildra, New South Wales on 17 June 1913.

== Playing career ==
Kelly went on to become a legend at the St. George as a player, coach and administrator. Known as 'The Deacon', Kelly played his entire football career at St George. He came to club via the junior club, Sutherland Grave-Diggers.

Kelly played twelve seasons for St. George between 1933 and 1944, the highlight being his vice-captaincy in the 1941 Grand Final winning team. In 1942 he became captain-coach. He played 208 grade games (all grades) with St. George, a record which stood till Norm Provan surpassed it late in his career.

Kelly retired from the Sydney league in 1944 to captain-coach at Picton for three years.

== Administrative career ==
Kelly returned to St George as an administrator in 1950 and also became an Australian selector in 1956. He was President of the St George Football Club and a director of St. George League's Club during the club's successful run of eleven straight premierships from 1956 to 1966. He retained those positions until 1977.

He later became vice-president of the NSWRFL under President Bill Buckley. Upon Buckley's death in 1973, it was assumed that Kelly would run rugby league in New South Wales, but the position was ultimately given to a more youthful Kevin Humphreys. Kelly remained N.S.W. Rugby League vice-president until his retirement in the late 1970s.

== Death ==
Len 'The Deacon' Kelly died at his Arncliffe, New South Wales home on 3 November 1981, age 68 after a long illness.

== Published sources ==
- Whiticker, Alan & Hudson, Glen (2006) The Encyclopedia of Rugby League Players, Gavin Allen Publishing, Sydney
- Haddan, Steve (2007) The Finals - 100 Years of National Rugby League Finals, Steve Haddan Publishing, Brisbane
