= Lindsay Johnson (rugby league) =

Australian rugby league footballer (1913-1952)

Personal information
- Full name: Lindsay Adolphus Johnson
- Born: 5 September 1913 Quirindi, New South Wales, Australia
- Died: 26 January 1952 (aged 38) Campsie, New South Wales, Australia

Playing information
- Position: Fullback
Club
Years	Team	Pld	T	G	FG	P
1940–46	Canterbury-Bankstown	91	0	144	0	288
Representative
Years	Team	Pld	T	G	FG	P
1940	New South Wales	2	0	0	0	0
1941	NSW City	1	0	0	0	0
- Relatives: Dick Johnson (brother)

Lindsay Adolphus Johnson (1913–1952) was an Australian rugby league footballer who played in the 1940s.

Originally from Newcastle, Lindsay Johnson came to Canterbury-Bankstown in 1940 and stayed at the club for seven seasons. He starred in the 1942 Grand Final by kicking the winning goal in Canterbury's 19–9 win over St George Dragons and he also played in the losing 1940 Grand Final. He kicked 144 goals during his seven seasons at the club and at one point he played 78 consecutive games. Lin Johnson also represented New South Wales on one occasion in 1940. He was the brother of Dick Johnson.

Johnson died at Canterbury Hospital on 26 January 1952, aged 38.
