= Cedric Turvey =

Australian rugby league footballer

Personal information
- Full name: Cedric William Turvey
- Born: 10 July 1917 Belmore, New South Wales, Australia
- Died: 10 October 1991 (aged 74) Caloundra, Queensland, Australia

Playing information
- Position: Five-eighth
Club
Years	Team	Pld	T	G	FG	P
1942–43	St. George	6	1	0	0	3
Representative
Years	Team	Pld	T	G	FG	P
1941	New South Wales	1	0	0	0	0

Cedric William Turvey (1917–1991) was an Australian rugby league footballer who played in the 1940s.

== Playing career ==
Turvey started his career as a local junior, progressing through to first grade via the Carlton Waratah's to the St George Presidents Cup team of 1939.

After a short stint playing Rugby League for Lithgow, Turvey represented Country Seconds and N.S.W. in 1941 before returning to the St George Dragons for one season in first grade in 1942. whilst on leave from the AIF and the RAAF during World War II.

Turvey played Five-Eighth in the Saints team that lost the 1942 Grand Final to Canterbury-Bankstown. He finished his St George career in Reserve grade in 1943. Turvey survived the war and finished his Rugby League career at Lithgow in 1946.

== Death ==
Turvey died on 10 October 1991, aged 74.
