= Dick Johnson (rugby league) =

Australian rugby league footballer

Personal information
- Full name: Allan Carlyle Johnson
- Born: 1 January 1916 Currabubula, New South Wales, Australia
- Died: 14 April 1984 (aged 68) Sydney, New South Wales, Australia

Playing information
- Position: Fullback
Club
Years	Team	Pld	T	G	FG	P
1938–39	South Sydney	29	2	1	0	8
1943–45	Western Suburbs	16	0	8	0	16
1946–48	Canterbury-Bankstown	38	1	2	0	7
	Total	83	3	11	0	31
Representative
Years	Team	Pld	T	G	FG	P
1938–45	New South Wales	11	1	0	0	3
1945	NSW City	1	0	0	0	0
- Source: As of 22 February 2019

A.C. "Dick" Johnson (1916–1984) was an Australian professional rugby league footballer who played in the 1930s and 1940s. He played for South Sydney, Western Suburbs and Canterbury-Bankstown as a fullback.

== Background ==
Johnson was from Currabubula near Quirindi, New South Wales.

He was the brother of former Newcastle, NSW and Canterbury fullback Lindsay Johnson

There was another player who played for Newtown in 1934 referred to as R. Johnson in programmes that year and was thought to be Dick but this was actually Ray Johnston who played for Newtown from 1934 to 1937.

== Playing career ==
Johnson made his first grade debut for Souths in 1939, Johnson played for Souths in the 1939 grand final defeat against Balmain.

In 1943, Johnson made the move to Western Suburbs and played there for two seasons. In 1946, Johnson joined Canterbury and played for the club in the 1947 grand final defeat against Balmain.

Johnson also represented New South Wales on 11 occasions between 1938 and 1945.
