= Jack O'Reilly (rugby league) =

Australian rugby league player

Playing information
- Position: Utility
Club
Years	Team	Pld	T	G	FG	P
1926–30	North Sydney Bears	6	0	0	0	0

Coaching information
Club
Years	Team	Gms	W	D	L	W%
1942	North Sydney Bears	14	5	0	9	36

Jack O'Reilly was an Australian rugby league player and coach for the North Sydney Bears.

O'Reilly was the son of athlete Bill O'Reilly, who held a long-standing national record for the hammer throw.

A utility, O'Reilly competed in first-grade for North Sydney from 1926 to 1930, making sporadic appearances as either a three-quarter or lock. He coached North Sydney to a third grade premiership in 1937, then in 1940 steered them to a reserves premiership. In the 1942 NSWRFL season, O'Reilly served as North Sydney's first-grade coach.
