= Alf Cox =

Australian rugby league footballer

Personal information
- Full name: Alfred Cusack Cox
- Born: 1919 Hurstville, New South Wales
- Died: 7 May 2008 (aged 88–89) Mortdale, New South Wales

Playing information
- Position: Five-eighth, Halfback
Club
Years	Team	Pld	T	G	FG	P
1942–45	St. George	37	4	7	0	26

Alf Cox (1919–2008) was an Australian rugby league footballer who played in the 1940s.

== Playing career ==
Alf Bunga Cox was the St. George first grade halfback during the war years (1942–1945) along with Alby McAndrew. He missed his chance in playing in the 1942 Grand Final due to a broken collarbone injury that was sustained on 8 August 1942 in the last game of the season against Easts.

Cox retired from first grade in 1946.

== Death ==
Cox died on 7 May 2008 at Mortdale, New South Wales, age 88.
