= Gerald Scully =

Australian rugby league footballer

Personal information
- Full name: Gerald Patrick Scully
- Born: 21 November 1920; Cammeray, New South Wales
- Died: 3 August 1999 (aged 78); Griffith, New South Wales

Playing information
- Position: Lock
Club
Years	Team	Pld	T	G	FG	P
1939–46	North Sydney	81	31	0	0	93
1947	Newtown	10	6	0	0	18
	Total	91	37	0	0	111
Representative
Years	Team	Pld	T	G	FG	P
1942–43	Sydney Firsts	2	0	0	0	0

Gerald Scully (1920-1999) was an Australian rugby league footballer who played in the 1930s and 1940s. Scully played in the NSWRFL premiership for North Sydney and Newtown as a lock.

== Playing career ==
Scully began his first grade career in 1939 aged 18 with Norths and played in the 1943 NSWRL grand final defeat against Newtown in front of a crowd of 60,922 which was a record attendance for a grand final at the time.

In 1947, Scully played one season with Newtown and his final game in first grade was the semi-final defeat against Canterbury.

Gerald Scully was an Australian serviceman during World War Two, serving as a Gunner in the 54 Australian Composite Anti-Aircraft Regiment.
