= Lin McLean =

Australian rugby league footballer

Personal information
- Full name: Lindley Alwyn John McLean
- Born: 29 April 1918 Taree, New South Wales, Australia
- Died: 15 January 1990 (aged 71) Brisbane, Queensland, Australia

Playing information
- Position: Centre, Wing
Club
Years	Team	Pld	T	G	FG	P
1939–48	Newtown	58	30	0	0	90
- Source: As of 12 June 2019

Lin McLean (1918–1990) was an Australian professional rugby league footballer who played in the 1930s and 1940s. He played for Newtown in the New South Wales Rugby League (NSWRL) competition.

== Playing career ==
McLean made his first grade debut for Newtown against St George in Round 9 1939 at Earl Park, Arncliffe. In his first season at Newtown, McLean made 4 appearances, as the club finished last on the table. In 1940, Newtown had a complete form reversal finishing second on the table. Newtown reached the preliminary final against Canterbury-Bankstown but lost the match 19–11, with McLean scoring a try in the defeat.

In 1942, Newtown finished second to last, and McLean finished the season as the club's top try scorer with 8 tries. In 1943, McLean missed the entire season as Newtown won their third and last premiership against North Sydney. In 1944, McLean was part of the Newtown side which won the minor premiership and reached the grand final. McLean played a centre as Newtown were defeated by Balmain 19–16. Due to the rules at the time, Newtown were permitted to ask for a rematch as they had finished as minor premiers and used their right to challenge. In the grand final challenge, McLean again played at centre as Newtown were defeated for a second time by Balmain 12–8 at the Sydney Cricket Ground.

McLean played with Newtown until the end of the 1948 season before retiring.
