= George Elley =

Australian rugby league footballer

Personal information
- Full name: George Elley

Playing information
- Position: Second-row, Lock
Club
Years	Team	Pld	T	G	FG	P
1942–45	Canterbury-Bankstown	36	10	0	0	30
- Source: As of 16 April 2019

George Elley was an Australian professional rugby league footballer who played in the 1940s. He played for Canterbury-Bankstown in the New South Wales Rugby League (NSWRL) competition.

== Playing career ==
Elley made his first grade debut for Canterbury against North Sydney in Round 1 1942 at North Sydney Oval. Canterbury would go on to claim the minor premiership in 1942. The club were defeated in the opening week of the finals against St George but still qualified for the grand final as a result. Elley played at second-row in the 1942 NSWRL grand final as Canterbury defeated St George 11–9 at the Sydney Cricket Ground in muddy conditions.

In the following 2 seasons, Canterbury went from winning the premiership in 1942 to running last in 1943 and 1944 claiming the wooden spoon. As of the 2019 season, no other club has gone from premiers to wooden spooners the next season with the exception of Melbourne who won the premiership in 2009 but were later stripped of the title for major breaches of the salary cap in 2010 and made to play for no points which resulted in the club coming last.

By 1945, Elley was playing for the Canterbury reserve grade team which reached the grand final against South Sydney. Elley retired following the conclusion of the 1945 season.
