= Rex Harrison (rugby league) =

Australian rugby league footballer and coach

Personal information
- Full name: Rex Aubrey Harrison
- Born: 27 June 1914 Adelaide, South Australia
- Died: 26 July 1996 (aged 82) North Sydney, New South Wales

Playing information
- Position: Five-eighth
Club
Years	Team	Pld	T	G	FG	P
1934–46	North Sydney	129	38	67	0	248
Representative
Years	Team	Pld	T	G	FG	P
1938–41	New South Wales	10	6	4	0	26
1939–42	NSW City	3	2	0	0	6
1936	Metropolis	3	2	0	0	6

Coaching information
Club
Years	Team	Gms	W	D	L	W%
1954–55	North Sydney	37	20	2	15	54

Rex Aubrey Harrison (27 June 1914 – 26 June 1996) was an Australian rugby league player who played in the 1930s and 1940s.

== Background ==
Harrison was born in Adelaide, South Australia on 27 June 1914.

== Playing career ==
Harrison was graded with North Sydney in 1934 and played eleven seasons with them from 1934-1942 and 1945–1946. Rex was an excellent five-eighth and represented N.S.W. City Firsts on three occasions in 1939,1941 and 1942. He also represented New South Wales on ten occasions between 1938–1941.

World War Two curtailed his Rugby League career and he was never able to represent Australia. He enlisted in the Australian Army in 1942 and attained the rank of corporal. He was discharged from active duty in 1945. He rekindled his career at North Sydney at the end of 1945, and played almost the entire 1946 season until he broke his collarbone in the second last game.

== Coaching career ==
He then retired as a player, although he went on to coach the minor grades at Norths with success, and was later promoted to first grade coach in 1954. Again he found success, taking the first grade team to the finals for the first time in a number of years.

Harrison died on 26 July 1996, aged 82.

Sporting positions
Preceded by Ross McKinnon; 1952–1953	Coach North Sydney; 1954–1955	Succeeded by Bruce Ryan; 1956
