= Bob Jackson (rugby league) =

Australian rugby league footballer

Personal information
- Full name: Robert Jackson

Playing information
- Position: Wing, Five-eighth
Club
Years	Team	Pld	T	G	FG	P
1941–42	Canterbury-Bankstown	19	9	14	0	55

Bob Jackson was a rugby league footballer who played in the 1940s. He played for Canterbury-Bankstown in the New South Wales Rugby League (NSWRL) competition.

== Playing career ==
Jackson joined Canterbury in 1941 making his debut against Western Suburbs.

Jackson played at five-eighth in 1941 but moved to the wing for the start of the 1942 season. He was a member of the 1942 Premiership winning team and scored Canterbury's only try in the grand final defeating St. George 11–9 at the Sydney Cricket Ground.

This would prove to be Canterbury's last premiership for 38 years until the club won their third title in 1980. Jackson then played for Valleys in the local Brisbane competition during the war years and after that moved to Cairns and Townsville.

Jackson captained a North Queensland representative side against the visiting British Lions in 1946. Jackson was later the secretary of the Victorian Rugby League.
