= Ray Lindwall =

Australian cricketer and rugby league footballer (1921–1996)

Ray Lindwall MBE
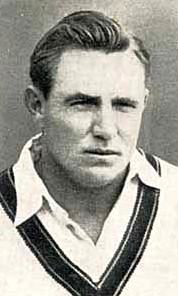
- Lindwall in the late 1940s

Personal information
- Full name: Raymond Russell Lindwall
- Born: 3 October 1921; Mascot, New South Wales, Australia
- Died: 23 June 1996 (aged 74); Brisbane, Queensland, Australia
- Height: 5 ft 11 in (180 cm)
- Batting: Right-handed
- Bowling: Right-arm fast
- Role: All rounder

International information
- National side: Australia
- Test debut (cap 165): 29 March 1946 v New Zealand
- Last Test: 28 January 1960 v India

Domestic team information
- Years: Team
- 1941–1954: New South Wales
- 1954–1960: Queensland

Career statistics
Competition	Tests	First-class
Matches	61	228
Runs scored	1,502	5,042
Batting average	21.15	21.82
100s/50s	2/5	5/19
Top score	118	134*
Balls bowled	13,650	42,970
Wickets	228	794
Bowling average	23.03	21.35
5 wickets in innings	12	34
10 wickets in match	0	2
Best bowling	7/38	7/20
Catches/stumpings	26/–	123/–
- Source: CricketArchive, 27 December 2007
- Rugby league career

Playing information
- Position: Fullback
Club
Years	Team	Pld	T	G	FG	P
1940–46	St. George Dragons	31	7	123	0	267
- Source: Whiticker/Hudson
- Relatives: Jack Lindwall (brother)

Raymond Russell Lindwall MBE (3 October 1921 – 23 June 1996) was an Australian cricketer who played 61 Test matches for Australia between 1946 and 1960. He is widely regarded as one of the greatest fast bowlers in cricket history. In addition to his cricket career, he played top-flight rugby league for St. George, appearing in two grand finals for the club.

Lindwall made his first-class debut for New South Wales in 1941–42. At the same time, Lindwall played for St. George in the first-grade of the New South Wales Rugby Football League premiership as a full back. His career was interrupted by World War II, in which he served in the Australian Army in New Guinea from 1943 to 1945. He made his Test debut against New Zealand in March 1946. During the early part of his career, he also played rugby league at first-grade level before retiring from the sport in 1946 to focus on cricket.

As a right-arm fast bowler, Lindwall was known for his smooth, rhythmic action and ability to generate pace and swing. Together with Keith Miller, he formed one of the most celebrated new-ball partnerships in Test cricket. He was a key member of Don Bradman’s Australian team that toured England in 1948, known as “The Invincibles”.

Lindwall was also a capable lower-order batsman, scoring two Test centuries. He was inducted into the Australian Cricket Hall of Fame in 1996, named in the Australian Cricket Board’s Team of the Century in 2000, and inducted into the ICC Cricket Hall of Fame in 2009.

== Early years ==
Lindwall was born in Mascot, in the Eastern Suburbs of Sydney, the fourth of five children. He had one younger sister, two older sisters, one of which was Eileen Lindwall who married Frank Weston and an older brother. Being the grandson of Swedish and Irish immigrants, Lindwall had a difficult childhood with his mother Catherine dying of pneumonia when he was seven. His father Arthur had a job at the Water and Sewerage Board, but the children were aware that their father could not financially support them beyond school-leaving age.

At the age of 11, Lindwall and his elder brother Jack were spectators at the Sydney Cricket Ground during the second day of the First Test of the 1932–33 Ashes series. The series saw the usage of the notorious Bodyline tactics by England's pace battery led by Harold Larwood under the captaincy of Douglas Jardine. Larwood, a man of relatively short stature like Lindwall, was less than six feet and intimidated opposition batsmen with express pace bowling, aiming short-pitched bouncers at their upper body. Larwood also had a smooth, rhythmic run-up and a classical side-on action, something for which Lindwall became famous. The match was also remembered for Stan McCabe's much-celebrated 187 not out, aggressively resisting the Bodyline tactics as Australia fell to a heavy ten wicket defeat.

The Lindwall brothers returned to their home in Hurstville, where Ray henceforth attempted to emulate Larwood. He wanted to replicate the physical threat posed by Larwood to batsmen, as well as the dynamic batting of McCabe. Lindwall attempted to copy Larwood's action in his routine street cricket matches, before terrorising his classmates at primary school. Lindwall said that "he was the most famous fast bowler in the world and I naturally wanted to copy him". Lindwall's formal cricket education began the following year when he commenced his secondary schooling at Marist Brothers Kogarah. The school had teachers that had a habit of scouting around for athletic boys who could bring sporting honour to the institution. The headmaster, Brother Aidan O'Keefe, was a competent player and invested time into training Lindwall. O'Keefe taught Lindwall batting repertoire while also encouraging him to remain aggressive. He taught Lindwall to add accuracy and variation to his raw speed. By the age of 13, Lindwall was leading the under-15 school team, opening both the batting and bowling. Aged 14, Lindwall played in two distinct Saturday competitions – in the morning against schoolboys and with adults in the afternoon in a B-grade competition with Carlton Waratahs. On one outing, he scored 219 and an unbeaten 110 in two different matches on the same day.

Lindwall's physique had matured by the time he was 15, and he was also successful at athletics and swimming. Aware that he needed a good education with his family in poverty during the Great Depression, Lindwall lifted himself for his final year of junior high school and won a half-scholarship to Marist Brothers Darlinghurst for 1937 and 1938. However, Lindwall's focus on rugby league and cricket saw him fail his Leaving Certificate in his final year.

== Grade cricket under O'Reilly ==
During his secondary school years, Lindwall focused on his batting and gained a reputation as a dynamic shotmaker. In early October 1938, with his final school year drawing to a close, Lindwall was among a group of young cricketers who received an invitation to practise at the SCG with the state team. Lindwall was the first to volunteer to bowl to Jack Fingleton, who was one of Australia's first-choice opening batsmen, having just returned from the 1938 Ashes tour. Lindwall peppered Fingleton with a series of yorkers, bouncers and outswingers. In the space of 15 minutes, Lindwall bowled Fingleton four times and beat the bat on several other occasions. When questioned by his coach, Fingleton brushed off Lindwall's performance, noting "I'm just off the boat. I'm not seeing the ball." Lindwall was stung by the comments, noting that it taught him to hate all batsmen.

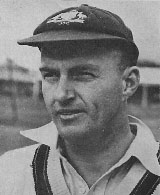
Bill O'Reilly, Lindwall's captain at St George

Lindwall was only in the Third XI of St. George at the time, but by December, he was in the First XI along with future Invincibles teammate Arthur Morris. The senior team was captained by Bill O'Reilly, a leg spin bowler who represented Australia in Tests and was regarded as the best bowler in the world. O'Reilly was a firm man and came to be a father figure for Lindwall. Lindwall came into the team seeing himself as an into-the-wind swing bowler. O'Reilly felt that pace bowlers were only useful for a few overs with new ball, so he instructed Lindwall to lengthen his run-up and bowl as fast as possible. O’Reilly also decided that the team needed more bowlers. He placed Lindwall low in the batting order, where he often did not get an opportunity to bat. Lindwall did not bother protesting, realising that dissent against the autocratic O’Reilly would be futile. O'Reilly also turned Morris from a bowler into a batsman. Both Morris and Lindwall became world-leading players in the fields that O’Reilly chose for them. By the end of the 1938–39 season, Lindwall had not yet established himself as a cricketer. Former Test batsman Charlie Macartney lamented what he perceived as a lack of talent and substance at St. George. Lindwall returned to school, attempting to obtain his Leaving Certificate while also playing third-grade rugby league. In July, Lindwall's father died, leaving him and his four siblings orphaned.

== Juggling work, war and first-class rugby league and cricket ==
At the end of the year, Lindwall gained his Leaving Certificate. This made him eligible to study at university, but it clashed with his desire to play sport and earn money to help support his parentless family. He thus took an office job with Commercial Steel and Forge Company, which manufactured aeroplane parts and bomb fuses. During the 1939–40 season, Lindwall's bowling was only moderately successful, with 16 wickets at 34.93. A highlight of the season was an unbeaten 49 as St. George won the grade final.

In the winter of 1940 Lindwall made his first grade rugby league debut in the New South Wales Rugby Football League premiership for the St. George club alongside his older brother Jack, who had been with the club since 1938. He played at fullback and assumed goal-kicking responsibilities. Lindwall's cricketing improved during the 1940–41 season, taking 34 wickets at 16.45, approximately doubling his wickets while halving their cost. By this time, many of his colleagues had enlisted in the armed services and the competition was beginning to thin out during World War II. Lindwall missed the 1941 NSWRFL season due to illness, and in doing so missed out on the team that won the premiership that season. In October 1941, Lindwall was selected to make his first-class cricket debut against Queensland in Brisbane, just after turning 20. Playing along his childhood hero McCabe, Lindwall put in a wayward performance. He conceded an expensive 81 runs in 15 wicketless overs and made just one run with the bat. The Sheffield Shield season was cancelled a month later after the December 1941 Pearl Harbor attack, that signalled the widening of the war into the Pacific arena. The Sydney grade cricket competition continued, and Lindwall helped St. George to a hat-trick of premierships with 27 wickets at 22.19 and 405 runs at 27.00.

During the winter of 1942, Lindwall helped the St. George Dragons rugby league team to reach the grand final for the second consecutive year and also finished the season as the League's top point-scorer. Lindwall and his brother Jack, who played on the wing, scored all of the team's points in the grand final, Jack scoring a try and Ray kicking three goals. However they were denied by a last-minute penalty goal and St. George were defeated by Canterbury-Bankstown 11–9. All the while, the Japanese were inching ever closer to Australia. Malaya had fallen and the northern Australian city of Darwin had been the subject of Japanese air raids.

Army commitments intervened during the 1943 season. Lindwall had attempted to enlist in the Royal Australian Air Force, but he was rejected because the employees of his firm were exempted from military service. Thus Lindwall resigned his job in order to join the army. As part of his Anti-aircraft and Fortress Signal unit, he was deployed in May 1943 to New Guinea as the Japanese reached the Kokoda Trail close to Port Moresby. Lindwall's unit were bombed while they were ashore and he was lucky not to be killed. In 1945, he returned from the Solomon Islands, where he was believed to have contracted malaria and dengue fever, although medical tests did not confirm this, he needed injections and atebrin tablets to aid him in recovering from bouts of minor illness for some time afterwards, and he resumed State cricket in 1945–46, despite the rigours of war having reduced him to just 73 kg, which was thin for his height of 178 cm.

== Post-war Test cricket debut ==
Lindwall resumed his first-class cricket career steadily against Queensland and South Australia. Lindwall gave his first indications of cricketing potential on a 38-degree day in the second innings of a match against Victoria. A day after suffering a mild malaria attack, Lindwall gave a spell of four overs which netted him three wickets, bowling at speeds not seen in Australia since Larwood. An innings of 134 not out in just 180 minutes against Queensland at the SCG underlined by cutting and driving exhibited his batting skill, and with a haul of 9/77 against South Australia further underlining his allround credential. Lindwall gained further attention when he turned out for New South Wales against the feted Australian Services team of Lindsay Hassett that had played in the 1945 Victory Tests in England. Lindwall's hostile bowling delivered three wickets in each innings, finishing with match figures of 6/95, leading Hassett to rate him as the best fast-bowling prospect in a decade. With 33 wickets for the season, Lindwall was selected for an Australian team tour of New Zealand under Bill Brown. He played in a Test against New Zealand, which was not awarded Test status until 1948. In a match in which Australia fielded seven Test debutants, Lindwall opened the bowling with state teammate Ernie Toshack. Lindwall had limited opportunities on a sticky wicket which favoured the slower bowling of O’Reilly and Toshack, who took eight and seven wickets respectively. He took 1/13 and 1/16 as Australia won by an innings and 103 runs. Lindwall made a duck in Australia's only innings.

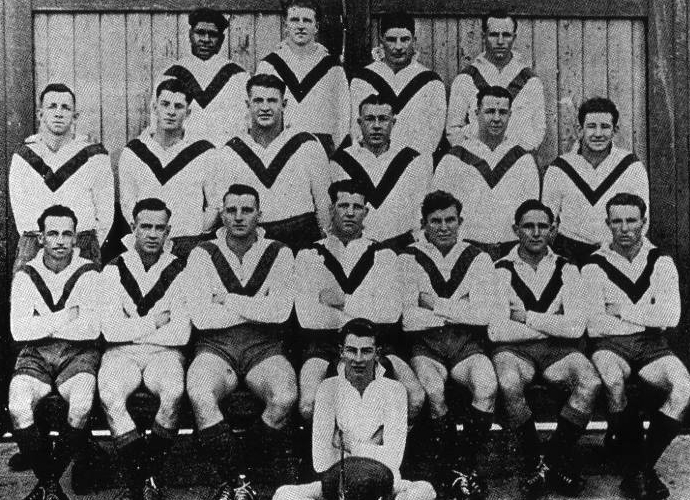
The St. George rugby league team of 1946. Lindwall is seated front right. His brother Jack is back right.

Lindwall returned to Australia and resumed his rugby league career with St. George in the 1946 NSWRFL season after a two-year absence, starting in reserve grade. His strong performances saw him promoted to first grade and that season St. George Dragons qualified for the grand final against the Balmain Tigers. Lindwall's goalkicking abilities were not on display that day, as Balmain won the game 13–12, scoring three tries to St George's four, with Lindwall missing every kick at goal. He retired from competitive rugby league on the advice of O`Reilly to concentrate on cricket. Lindwall played 31 first-grade rugby league games for St George, scoring seven tries (then worth three points) and kicking 123 goals for a total of 267 career points. The narrow losses in the 1942 and 1946 grand finals prevented him from emulating Herbie Collins' unique feat of following a New South Wales Rugby League premiership victory with captaining the Australian cricket team. Lindwall's brother Jack was, at the time of his retirement, the club's leading try-scorer with 110.

== Test career ==
Having retired from rugby league, Lindwall was selected to make his Ashes and home soil debut in the First Test against England in Brisbane. It was his first Test under the captaincy of Don Bradman, universally regarded as the best batsman in history. Bradman had just returned from a break. Lindwall was a fan of Bradman's leadership, recalling that "he put me at ease straight away" and that "his presence was inspiring for all the team". Lindwall waited for over two days to see action, coming to bat after Australia had reached 7/599. He scored his first runs with 31 as Australia reached 645. He bowled only briefly in the first innings, with 0/23 before being forced from the field with chickenpox, which prevented him from bowling in the second innings as Australia secured a heavy innings victory. The illness prevented Lindwall from playing in the Second Test in Sydney in what would have been his first Test in his home town.

Lindwall returned for the Third Test at Melbourne which saw 343,675 spectators – second only to the 350,534 at the Third Test on the same ground in 1936–37 – with record receipts of £44,063. Lindwall was dismissed for only nine in Australia's first innings, bowled by Alec Bedser. He set up a successful fast bowling partnership with Keith Miller, known for giving the English batsmen an "opening blitz", especially Len Hutton. One English pressman wrote that this was Bodyline, to the anger of Vic Richardson, Alan Kippax and Clarrie Grimmett who had seen the real thing. Lindwall took his first Ashes wicket, having Test world record holder Len Hutton caught for two by a diving Colin McCool before having Bill Edrich leg before wicket. Lindwall later dismissed English captain Wally Hammond in the second innings. However, it was Lindwall's batting in the second innings that was the highlight of the Test, scoring his first Test century. Lindwall and wicketkeeper Don Tallon (92) produced a counterattacking eighth wicket partnership of 154 in only 87 minutes. Lindwall was on 80 when Tallon fell and was still 19 runs short when last man Toshack came to the crease. Toshack defended grimly as Lindwall attacked and reached 100 before being caught. Lindwall brought up his century by walking three metres out of his crease and straight-driving Alec Bedser to the fence. Lindwall's innings lasted only 113 minutes and 90 balls, the second fastest in Australian Test history after Jack Gregory's 67-ball effort in 1920–21.

In the Fourth Test at Adelaide Lindwall came the closest to a hat-trick in his entire Test career. He finished England's innings by clean bowling three batsmen in four deliveries, with the unsuccessful ball barely missing Doug Wright's stumps to end with 4/52. Lindwall took the last four wickets in two overs, conceding two runs. He took 2/60 and scored 20 in another drawn match. Lindwall came into the final Test on his home ground in Sydney with a match haul of 10/73 in a Shield match. He continued his productive series with 7/63 in the first innings on a flat pitch, managing to generate enough pace to knock the bat out of Denis Compton's hands. Lindwall took two further wickets in the second innings as Australia took a 3–0 series win with another innings victory. Lindwall topped the bowling averages on either side with 18 wickets at 20.38, in addition to his 160 runs at 32.00.

In the 1947–48 season, the tour by the Indian cricket team saw Lindwall take his career best bowling figures of 7/38 at the Adelaide Oval in the second innings of the Fourth Test. Lindwall was again the leading wicket-taker for the series, with 18 wickets at 16.88, in addition to his 70 runs at 14.00.

In the First Test at the Gabba, Lindwall removed Vinoo Mankad and Gul Mohammad in the first over on a sticky wicket, precipitating a collapse which saw India skittled for 58.

== Invincibles ==
As a result, Lindwall was selected as part of Sir Donald Bradman's Invincibles that toured England without defeat in 1948. There were two concerns for Lindwall in the lead-up to the start of the tour. Lindwall was carrying an injured leg tendon and his foot drag in the delivery stride led to murmurings in the media and among umpires as to its legality. Bradman arranged for Lindwall to see his Melbourne masseur Ern Saunders, who had Lindwall's leg back to prime condition in a fortnight. On the public relations front. Bradman stated his firm belief that Lindwall's delivery was fair. During the lengthy boat journey to England, Bradman emphasized to Lindwall the importance of caution with respect to his bowling action. Bradman advised Lindwall to keep his dragging rear right foot even further than usual, to avoid being no-balled, and to avoid bowling at full speed until the umpires were satisfied with his action. Bradman assured Lindwall that he was an automatic selection for the Tests even if he did not take a wicket in the lead-in tour matches, telling him that being passed by the umpires was the first priority. Bradman recalled how Ernie McCormick had been no-balled 35 times in traditional tour opener against Worcester during the 1938 tour, destroying his confidence. Lindwall was not no-balled in the first match at Worcester, and so it remained for the rest of the tour.

With matters now turned to actual bowling, Lindwall's classical bowling action evoked as much public interest as his captain's batting. In a match against Nottinghamshire at Trent Bridge he took 6/14, to gain a psychological blow for the forthcoming Test at the same venue. Three of his victims were castled by his yorker. In the following match he twice skittled Sussex with match figures of 11/59, five of whom were bowled by yorkers, as the hosts were bowled out for 86 and 138 respectively.

Lindwall lined up for the First Test at Trent Bridge, where he had taken six wickets in the tour game. Australia bowled first, and Lindwall took the wicket of Cyril Washbrook, before he was forced to leave the field with a groin strain with figures of 1/30. Lindwall returned in Australia's innings, batting at No. 9 without a runner, where he partnered vice-captain Hassett (137) in a century partnership to lift Australia's score to 509 to take a 344-run lead. Lindwall could not bowl in the second innings as Australia completed an eight-wicket victory.

Lindwall was subjected to a thorough fitness test on the morning of the Second Test at Lord's two weeks later, the home of cricket. Bradman was not convinced of Lindwall's fitness, but the bowler's protestations were sufficient to convince his captain to gamble on his inclusion. Australia won the toss and elected to bat, allowing Lindwall further time to recover. Lindwall contributed 15 to Australia's total of 350. He then took the new ball and felt pain in his groin again after delivering his first ball to Hutton. Despite this, Lindwall persevered through the pain. He had Washbrook caught behind in his fourth over and then clean bowled Edrich and Tom Dollery in the space of three balls. England were 4/46 and Australia firmly in control. He later returned to bowl English captain Norman Yardley after an 87 run stand with Compton, before finishing with 5/70 as Australia took a 135 first innings lead. Lindwall then contributed 25 as Australia declared at 7/460 immediately upon his dismissal, leaving England to chase a world-record 596 for victory. Lindwall removed Hutton with the new ball and later returned to remove Dollery and Jim Laker without the addition of a single run to take 3/61 as Australia took a 409 run victory. In later years, Bradman told Lindwall that he pretended not to notice Lindwall's pain. Lindwall was worried that Bradman had noticed his injury, but Bradman later claimed that he feigned ignorance to allow Lindwall to relax.

When the teams reconvened at Old Trafford for the Third Test, Hutton had been dropped. The reason was said to be Hutton's struggles with Lindwall's short-pitched bowling. The Australians were pleased, feeling that Hutton was England's best batsman. England batted first and made 350, with Compton making an unbeaten 145 despite being felled by a Lindwall bouncer. This forced Compton to leave the field with a bloodied eyebrow with the score at 2/33. Lindwall then removed George Emmett, Edrich and Jack Crapp to leave England at 5/119 before Compton returned to revive the innings as Lindwall ended with 4/99. Lindwall came into bat at 6/172 with Sid Barnes forced to retire hurt and Australia facing the prospect of the follow on. He then received five consecutive bouncers from Edrich, one of which hit him in the hand, evoking cheers from the home crowd. Lindwall made 23 as Australia struggled to 221 and avoided the follow on. Lindwall removed Emmett for a duck in the second innings, bringing his tormentor Edrich to the crease. Bradman advised Lindwall not to bowl any bouncers at Edrich, fearing that it would be interpreted as retaliation and lead to a negative media reaction. The match petered into a draw after the entire fourth day was washed out.

Hutton returned for the Fourth Test at Headingley and an opening partnership of 168 resulted until he was bowled by Lindwall. England ran up a large score of 496, with Lindwall taking 2/79. In reply, Australia was still some way behind when Lindwall came in at 6/329. With the fall of Sam Loxton and Ron Saggers, Australia was at 8/355 with only Bill Johnston and Ernie Toshack remaining. Lindwall hit out, scoring 77, an innings marked by powerful driving and pulling, dominating in stands of 48 and 55 with Johnston and Toshack respectively, leaving Australia 38 runs in arrears on the first innings. Lindwall took 2/84 before England declared on the final day, leaving Australia to chase a world Test record of 404 for victory, which they did successfully. Centuries to Bradman and Morris in a 301-run stand saw Australia seal the series 3–0 with a world record.

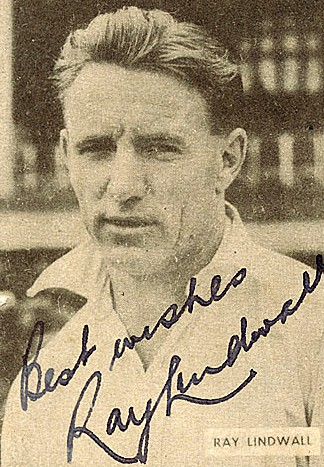
A signed sports card of Lindwall.

The final Test at The Oval saw Lindwall at his best. English captain Yardley won the toss and elected to bat on a rain affected pitch. Lindwall had Compton dismissed before lunch after Morris had taken a difficult catch. After the break, England had struggled to 4/35, before Lindwall bowled Yardley with a swinging yorker. He then had Godfrey Evans, Alec Bedser and Jack Young all yorked in the space of two runs. The innings ended at 52 when Hutton leg glanced and was caught by wicket-keeper Don Tallon, who caught the ball one handed at full stretch to his left. Lindwall described the catch as one of the best he had ever seen. In his post-lunch spell, Lindwall bowled 8.1 overs, taking five wickets for eight runs, finishing with 6/20 in 16.1 overs. Bradman described the spell as "the most devastating and one of the fastest I ever saw in Test cricket". After Australia had replied with 389, England were bowled out for 188 in their second innings, giving Australia an innings victory and the series 4–0. Lindwall took 3/50 to give him 9/70 for the match. He ended the series as the leading wicket-taker with 27 wickets at 19.62, and scored 191 runs at 31.83. The English were unable to cope with his swing, with 43 of his wickets coming after the batsmen had missed the ball and were bowled. For the entire tour, Lindwall took 86 wickets at 15.68 and scored 405 runs at 24.17. Lindwall's Test haul of 27 scalps equalled the record for an Australian fast bowler in England. Wisden recognised him by naming him as one of its five Wisden Cricketers of the Year in 1949, citing his ability to allow Australia to seize the initiative in all but one of the Tests by achieving early breakthroughs against their batting. Wisden said that "by whatever standard he is judged", Lindwall must "be placed permanently in the gallery of great fast bowlers", attributing his success to "superb control of length and direction, his change of pace and general skill, the like of which in a slower bowler could be classed as cunning". The ferocity of Lindwall's bouncer often prompted opposing batsmen to retreat onto the back foot even before he had released the ball. These efforts led him to achieve the number 1 ranking in ICC Test Bowlers ranking for 1948 (which he regained in 1949).

== Later career ==
Upon the return of the Invincibles to Australian soil, Lindwall played in Bradman's Testimonial match at the MCG in December 1948. Lindwall featured prominently on the first day, smashing 104 in 86 minutes for Hassett's XI. The match raised around 10,000 pounds.

The following season in 1949–50, the Australians headed to South Africa for a five Test tour. Lindwall's partnership with Miller was broken up when the latter was omitted from the touring squad. Miller stated that he wished to be considered only as a batsman and his omission caused great controversy. In any case, Miller was drafted in as cover after Johnston was involved in a car accident at the start of the tour, although both went on to play in all five Tests. Lindwall started the tour on a poor note in the First Test at Wanderers in Johannesburg, scoring 21 and then going wicketless as Australia completed an innings victory. It was the first time that Lindwall had failed to take a wicket in both innings of a Test. His wicketless run persisted until the second innings of the Second Test in Cape Town, where he took 5/32 after the hosts had been forced to follow on, as Australia completed another easy victory. Lindwall then took match figures of 4/54 as Australia completed a hat-trick of victories at Durban. Lindwall took 3/82 in South Africa's only innings in the Fourth Test at Johannesburg, but was dropped for the Fifth Test, something that surprised cricket commentators. His tour had been intermittently interrupted by groin problems, fibrositis and a stomach disorder, and his 12 wickets at an average of 20.66 at three wickets per match was below his customary rate. Overall, when fit, he was effective, with 50 wickets at 14.58. Lindwall forced his way back into the XI for the First Test of the 1950–51 Ashes series against Freddie Brown's England team. Australia struggled to 228 in its first innings with Lindwall making the second top-score of 41 in supporting Neil Harvey (74) in a rearguard action. Lindwall was not required as Miller and Johnston's medium pace reduced England to 7/68 on a sticky wicket before Brown declared, forcing the Australian to bat on the unfavourable pitch. Australia then declared at 7/32. Lindwall yorked Reg Simpson first ball and Australia seized the initiative, reducing England to 6/30 before bowling them out for 122 to take the match by 70 runs. Lindwall took five wickets in the Second Test in Melbourne, two of which came in the closing stages of the English run-chase. Chasing 178, England lost Brown and Evans in consecutive overs to the second new ball and ended 28 runs short of victory. Australia went on seal the series with an innings victory in the Third Test in Sydney – Lindwall bowled Brown and Bedser before breaking Trevor Bailey's thumb in the first innings to help Australia seize control. In the Fourth Test in Adelaide, Lindwall took 3/51 in England's first innings before scoring a patient 31 in Australia's second innings, helping to set up at target that was 274 runs too much for Brown's men. The Fifth and final Test of the summer was to be the first Test defeat for Lindwall in the first 24 Tests of his career. Despite taking 3/77 in the first innings to complement the four wickets of Miller – the most in an innings by the pair during the series – England took their first win over Australia since 1938. Lindwall had taken 15 wickets at 22.93 for the series.

The 1951–52 season saw the arrival of the West Indies for the first time in two decades. The West Indians had just defeated England in England and were expected to test Australia, with the series seen as the battle between the best two teams in the world. Their batting was led by the celebrated batting trio, the three W's: Frank Worrell, Everton Weekes and Clyde Walcott. Lindwall entered the First Test in Brisbane in good form, having taken nine wickets in a Sheffield Shield match against Queensland in the lead-up. His pace caught the tourists off guard, having not faced a bowler of such speed before. He took 4/62 in the first innings before top-scoring with 61 as Australia struggled and managed to only post a first innings lead of 10 runs. Lindwall was wicketless in the second innings and Australia faced 236 to win. They were again struggling at 6/149, before a sixth wicket stand of 54 between Lindwall (29) and Graeme Hole (45*) saw Australia secure a narrow three wicket victory. The Second Test in Sydney saw an increase in the amount of short-pitched deliveries, leading Wisden to bemoan the "relentless bumper tactics". Lindwall's bowling unsettled the West Indian batsmen but their captain John Goddard felt that the tactics were legitimate and that his batsmen should counter-attack. Lindwall took 4/66 in the first innings before scoring 48 as Australia took a 155 first innings lead. In the second innings, Lindwall took two further wickets and struck vice-captain Jeff Stollmeyer in the head. At one stage, Lindwall bowled 15 bouncers in five overs. Australia went on to win the match by seven wickets. The Third Test was an uneventful one for Lindwall, taking a solitary wicket as the tourists took a six wicket victory on a sticky pitch. Lindwall had another unspectacular match in the Fourth Test with combined figures of 3/131, before contributing 29 in the run chase of 260. Australia narrowly made the target with one wicket in hand, allowing them to take a 3–1 series lead instead of a 2–2 result. The series ended with a controversial battle between Lindwall and Weekes on the final day of the Fifth Test in Sydney. The tourists resumed at 2/112 in pursuit of 416 for victory and were repeatedly bounced by Lindwall and Miller. During Lindwall's sixth over, Weekes missed an attempted hook shot after hesitating. His batting partner Stollmeyer ordered him not to play the hook, something that Lindwall overheard. Lindwall responded by bowling further bouncers, which elicited uncertain responses from the batsman. Weekes repeatedly positioned himself to hook, before restraining himself, leading to further instructions from Stollmeyer and taunting from the Australians. Lindwall bowled his fourth consecutive bouncer and managed to extract an uncertain hook shot from Weekes, which resulted in his dismissal behind the wicket. Lindwall went on to take 5/52 for the innings and 7/72 for the match, securing a 4–1 series win. Lindwall had contributed heavily to the team's success with bat and ball, with 21 wickets at 23.04 and 211 runs at 26.37, but he was also criticised for his use of the short ball.

Lindwall accepted an offer to play in the Lancashire League in England during the Australian winter of 1952, joining Nelson Cricket Club for a sum of 600 pounds and bonuses, which did not include the boat fares for him and his wife. Lindwall took 96 wickets at 8.37 during the season and developed an inswinger on the advice of a local umpire who adamantly refused to give leg before wicket decisions to outswingers. Lindwall returned to Australia with a newborn son who has been born during his stay in Lancashire, and he was greeted by media speculation as to whether his professional sojourn had improved or detracted from his capabilities. Lindwall's form leading into the Tests against South Africa in 1952–53 prompted observers to opine that he was bowling better than ever, reinforced with the inswinger and his trademark Yorker. Lindwall made 70 from a total of 148 on a sticky wicket against South Australia in Adelaide that led Miller to regard it as the best innings he had seen under such conditions. He made the score after being sent in to open the batting in the absence of Sid Barnes.

Lindwall showed his versatility again in the First Test in Brisbane, scoring an unbeaten 38 in the second innings to extend Australia's lead to 373. When South Africa attempted to chase the target, Lindwall took 5/60 to cut them down 96 runs short of victory. Lindwall was reunited with Miller when the latter returned from injury for the Second Test at Melbourne, and despite the old combination taking 12 wickets, with Lindwall taking match figures of 5/116, Australia fell 82 runs short and South Africa had its first Test victory over Australia in 42 years. The teams moved to the home ground of Miller and Lindwall for the Third Test in Sydney, and the local pair delivered, taking seven wickets between them to skittle the tourists for 173, with Lindwall taking 4/40. With Australia having taken a 270 first innings lead, Lindwall allowed Australia to seize the initiative, removing both openers in his first three overs, before ending with 4/72 to ensure an innings victory and a 2–1 series lead. The value of Lindwall and Miller were demonstrated during the final two Tests. At the Fourth Test in Adelaide, both broke down mid-game and left Australia two bowlers short. Chasing 377, the South Africans managed to stave off the bowling and secure a draw. Both were absent for the Fifth Test in Melbourne and South Africa capitalised, defeating the Australians by six wickets despite the home side having scored 520 in their first innings. The absence of Lindwall and Miller's new ball partnership allowed South Africa to fight back and draw the series 2–2, making it the first series that Australia had not won since 1938. Lindwall had taken 19 wickets at 20.16 in just three and a half Tests for the series, and Australia seemed unlikely to find replacements for their leading strike pair anytime soon; their eventual successors Richie Benaud and Alan Davidson were still to become regular internationals.

== 1953: Lindwall's peak ==
Lindwall returned to England in 1953, the site of his triumph five years earlier. Lindwall was to exhibit performances that were rated higher than during the Invincibles tour. Roland Perry wrote that Lindwall "reached his zenith, producing a sustained, sensational season of brilliant, powerful and intelligent fast bowling". In the tour matches leading up to the Test, Lindwall set about gaining a psychological advantage over England's leading batsmen. In doing so, he could leave them in a poor state leading up to the Test, potentially curtailing their ability to win matches. In a match against Yorkshire, Lindwall bowled Hutton with an inswinger yorker, something he had developed the previous year. During a match against the country champions Surrey at The Oval, Lindwall came across Peter May, who was regarded as the best young English batsman to emerge from the post-war era. Lindwall's first over to May consisted of three inswingers and three outswingers, leaving him perplexed and uncertain about his position at top level cricket. Although Lindwall did not dismiss May, he regarded it as his best over at any level of cricket. The unsettled May was bowled in the following over by Ron Archer. Lindwall's performances saw him regarded as the finest fast bowler of his time.

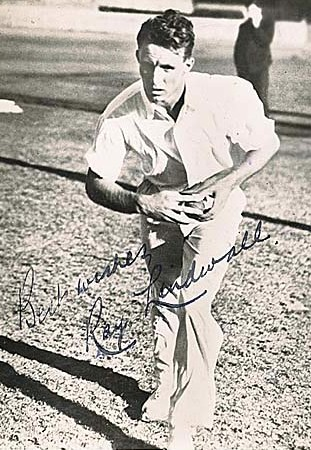
A signed picture of Lindwall at practice

After Australia had been bowled out for 249 in the first innings of the First Test at Trent Bridge, Lindwall's high paced swing yielded 5/57 and cut England down for 144. However, Australia were then bowled out for only 123, leaving England 228 for victory. They were 1/120 with Lindwall wicketless as rain curtailed the match. In the Second Test at Lord's, England had reached 1/177 at stumps on the second day in reply to Australia's 346. The following day, Lindwall yorked rising star Tom Graveney and took 5/66 to restrict England to a lead of 26 runs. In Australia's second innings, Lindwall scored the fastest half-century in Ashes history. He took just 48 minutes to reach the mark, with two sixes and five fours. The match was drawn with Lindwall taking 2/26 in the second innings. Lindwall had helped to reduce England to 3/12 at stumps on the fourth day after removing Don Kenyon and Hutton with the new ball, but defiant batting on the final day saved the English. The Third Test was again drawn due to heavy rain, with Lindwall failing to pass double figures in either innings and taking 2/30 in the first innings. Hassett won the toss for the fourth consecutive Test at Headingley and sent England into bat. In front of his home crowd in Yorkshire, Hutton was yorked second ball from a pacy inswinging yorker. Lindwall produced a display of fast and accurate pace bowling, taking 5/54 from 35 overs as England managed only 169. After Australia took a 97 run lead, Lindwall took 3/104 to help leave the tourists with a victory target of 177. This was not before dour English all rounder Trevor Bailey attempted to stone-wall an Australian victory by batting for over four hours for 38 runs. Along with Miller, the pair took 14 wickets between them, displaying their pivotal role in Australia's bowling attack, especially in the absence of the injured Johnston, who was unavailable for most of the tour. Hutton ordered Bedser and Bailey to bowl leg theory from a long run, sending balls down the leg side to prevent the Australians from scoring. England held on for a draw with Australia 30 runs short when time ran out. The teams met at The Oval for the deciding Test and Australia could manage 275 after winning the toss with Lindwall striking a quickfire 62 noted for an array of off drives to top score and push the total to respectability. Lindwall then took 4/70 but it was not enough to prevent England taking a 31 run lead. Australia collapsed for 162 in the second innings, with the Surrey spin twins of Jim Laker and Tony Lock taking nine wickets between them. This left England 132 to win, something they achieved with eight wickets intact. Lindwall was unable to remove any of the Englishmen.

The 1–0 loss was Australia's first series defeat since the notorious Bodyline series twenty years earlier that had motivated Lindwall to take up fast bowling. Despite Australia's troubles, Lindwall maintained his high standards, taking 26 wickets at an average of only 18.84, as well as contributing two fifties for a total of 159 runs at 17.66. For the entire tour, he had taken 85 wickets at 16.40, only one less than in 1948. At 32 years of age, Lindwall still maintained his high pace, but had developed more subtleties and an inswinger. Fingleton, now a journalist said "One wonders once more at Lindwall's amazing capacity to bowl this ball whenever he feels like it".

== Transfer to Queensland ==
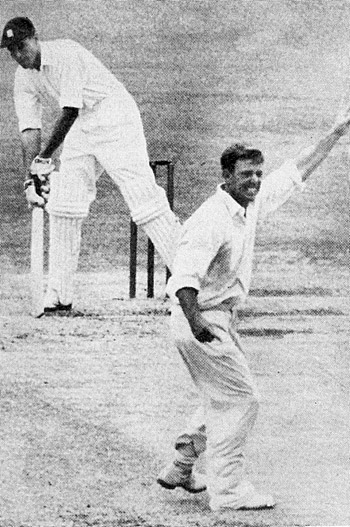
Lindwall traps Peter May LBW in the First Test against England, 1954–55.

In November 1953, Lindwall was given employment in Brisbane for the bus and transport company Cobb and Co., but continued to play for New South Wales for the remainder of the 1953–54 season before being dropped for the last match of the domestic season. The move generated criticism from the cricketing community who felt that Lindwall's service merited a more dignified farewell. Lindwall had a mediocre season by his standards, taking only 22 wickets at 30.14. His batting was even more ineffective, scoring only 14 runs in six innings. Such performances led to media speculation that Lindwall was in decline. Lindwall began his career for Queensland at the start of the 1954–55 season and did well enough to retain his place for the First Test of England's Ashes tour. In front of his adopted home crowd, Lindwall returned to form with the bat, scoring an unbeaten 64 as Australia amassed 8/601 after being sent in by Hutton. Lindwall compounded Hutton's match by removing him for four and finished with 3/27 as England were skittled for 190 and forced to follow on. He took two further wickets as England fell to an innings defeat. After the match, English paceman Frank Tyson asked Lindwall for advice on how to bowl a more effective bouncer. Lindwall promised that he would show Tyson on their next meeting, which happened to be the Second Test in Sydney. Lindwall bowled Tyson in the first innings and in the second innings, Lindwall gave him a bouncer which skidded towards Tyson's throat. Tyson turned his head and was hit the back of the skull, His batting partner Bill Edrich shouting "My God, Lindy, you've killed him!". Tyson was taken to hospital for X-rays and was bowled upon his return by Lindwall. He later said "thanks so much for showing me the bouncer". Lindwall took five wickets for the match but Tyson returned to win the low scoring match for England. Lindwall struggled in the Third Test while carrying a leg strain and a bout of hepatitis, taking only 1/111 for the match as England won again. He then pulled a muscle in the Sheffield Shield match and was sidelined as England sealed the series with a third consecutive win. Lindwall returned for the Fifth Test and dismissed Hutton early, before ending with 3/77. The third of his wickets was Bailey, giving Lindwall his 100th wicket in Ashes Tests. England amassed their highest total of the series but Australia managed to hang on for a draw after being forced to follow on. Lindwall ended with 14 wickets at 27.21 for the season, which was below his usual standards as Australia were convincingly defeated 3–1. The critics called for sweeping changes to the team. O'Reilly, Lindwall's mentor, was now a journalist and called for new selectors, claiming that Australia was at its worst for four decades.

Lindwall had no intentions to retire. He continued onto the early 1955 tour of the West Indies, the first by an Australian team to the Caribbean. Lindwall was determined to enjoy himself, having recovered from his recent illness. By day, he and Miller battled with the three W's but at night they socialised. However, Lindwall needed respite and dietary discipline in order to completely ward off his hepatitis. He was no longer the reveller that Miller once knew. After Australia had made 9/515, Lindwall took a match total of 6/124, as the hosts were forced to follow on in the First Test at Sabina Park in Kingston, Jamaica. Australia went on to win by nine wickets. The team's travelled to Queen's Park in Trinidad for the Second Test, where the West Indies batted first and made 382. This time Lindwall bowled a long spell of 24.5 overs, and eventually prized out six of the West Indians for the cost of 95 runs. The culmination of this was a spell of 4/16. Australia replied with 9/600, with Lindwall contributing an unbeaten 37 with the bat. Lindwall's match soured in the second innings when he broke down with an achilles tendon problem as the match ended in a draw. Lindwall recovered for the start of the Third Test at Bourda in Georgetown, Guyana. Lindwall had a quiet time in a spin dominated game, taking two wickets in an eight-wicket Australian victory. Australia won the toss and batted in the Fourth Test at Bridgetown, Barbados. Australia had already reached 6/439 when Lindwall came to the crease. In a highly aggressive innings, he reached his fifty in 69 minutes and was unbeaten on 80 at stumps. The next morning, he went on the make his second Test century, scoring 118 with two sixes and 16 fours. It was his second century at Test level, eight years after his first, but showed the same counter-attacking aggression. Lindwall had another quiet match with two wickets in another high scoring draw with both teams amassing more than 500 in the first innings. Lindwall finished the series with four wickets in the Fifth Test in Jamaica as Australia completed a 3–0 series win with another innings triumph. In a high scoring series, Lindwall had taken 20 wicket at 31.85 while also scoring 187 runs at 37.40, a strong all round performance.

Lindwall performed steadily during the 1955–56, which was purely domestic. Lindwall was appointed the Queensland captain, and he took 30 wickets at 28.97 and made 383 runs at 32.55. Lindwall was duly selected for the 1956 Ashes tour. Like the rest of the team, Lindwall had a poor tour on a series of dry and underprepared pitches designed to favour the Surrey spin twins of Laker and Lock. Lindwall's tour was further compounded by a recurrence of his groin injury. He took 0/43 in the first innings of the opening Test at Trent Bridge and broke down, being unable to bowl in the second innings. This forced him to miss the Second Test at Lord's, and he returned for a disastrous Third Test at Headingley. Although Lindwall took 3/67 in the first innings, Australia was forced to follow on and fell to its first innings loss since 1938, as Laker and Lock ravaged the Australians. Lindwall took two wickets in the Fourth Test at Old Trafford but the results were the same; Australia suffered another innings defeat in what was known as "Laker's Test" – the off-spinner took 19 of the Australian wickets to fall. Lindwall bade farewell to Test cricket in England at The Oval, taking two wickets. Overall, it had been a disappointing tour; Lindwall had been fit for three and a half Tests and managed only seven wickets at 34.14 Lindwall's performance reignited calls for the ageing paceman to be axed from the team. Lindwall however, had other ideas.

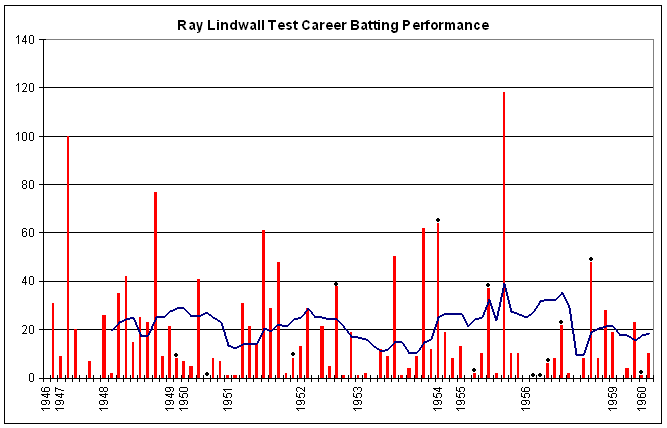
Ray Lindwall's Test batting performances. The red bars indicate the runs that he scored in an innings, with the blue line indicating the batting average in his last ten innings. The blue dots indicate an innings where he remained not out.

Following the England tour, the Australians returned home via a tour to the Indian subcontinent. The first stop was Karachi, where Australia played its first ever Test against Pakistan. Lindwall's poor run continued, scoring two and a duck and taking match figures of 1/64 as Australia fell to a nine wicket defeat. The team travelled to Madras for the first of three Tests in India. Lindwall briefly bowled on the first morning without success before succumbing to a severe stomach bug. He took no further part in the first innings and spent the next two days in bed. Lindwall briefly got out of his bed on day three to bat, making only eight as Australia took a 158 run first innings lead. He hauled himself out of bed on the fourth day, and cut through the Indians in three spells, taking 7/43 in an innings victory.

The Second Test in Bombay was the only time that Lindwall was to captain Australia in a Test match. Captain Johnson and his deputy Miller were both injured, leaving the bowling depleted. Ron Archer was injured and unavailable as Australia bowled first in extremely hot conditions. The situation worsened throughout the match as pacemen Alan Davidson and Pat Crawford were hindered by stomach bugs and hip strains respectively during the game. Leg spinner Richie Benaud could not bowl for part of the match after being affected by a fever and left arm orthodox spinner John Wilson pulled a muscle midway through his debut. This left Lindwall and batting all rounder Ken Mackay as the only fully fit bowling options. Australia bowled out India for 251, before a strong batting effort led by Neil Harvey and Jim Burke, both of whom made centuries, saw Australia make 7/523. Lindwall contributed a hard-hitting unbeaten 48 at the end. Australia's depleted bowling told in the home side's second innings, as the visitors were only able to prise out five wickets and match ended in a draw, with Indian captain Polly Umrigar batting for six hours for a defiant 78. Lindwall finished the tour with scores of eight and 28 in the Third Test in Madras. In a low scoring match in which all four innings finished under 190, Lindwall took match figures of 3/41 in a 94 run victory. It was a successful series for Lindwall, taking 12 wickets at 16.58 and scoring 92 runs at 30.66.

== Omission and comeback ==
The end of the tour represented a changing of the guard in Australian cricket. In their late 30s, Johnson and Miller retired from first-class cricket. In the 1956–57 season, Lindwall took 27 wickets at 23.74 and made 243 runs at 27.00. Having had a successful series in the most recent international fixtures, Lindwall had no reason to expect anything but a continuation of his senior role in the team. Furthermore, having captained the team in the absence of Johnson and Miller, Lindwall was now the player with the most seniority in terms of leadership. However, when the team for the 1957–58 South African tour was announced, Lindwall's name was omitted altogether. Lindwall heard the news on the radio while he was working, having not being given prior notice. After three consecutive Ashes defeats during Australia's decline in the mid-1950s, the selectors had turned to a radical youth policy in an attempt to reverse the slide. Ian Craig was made Australia's youngest captain at the age of 22, having played only six Tests without securing a regular place in the team. The pacemen selected were Davidson, Ian Meckiff, Ron Gaunt and John Drennan. Davidson had managed only 16 wickets at 34.06 in 12 Tests, while the remaining three had yet to play a Test. While Craig's men defeated South Africa 3–0, Lindwall continued his consistent performances for Queensland in the Sheffield Shield, with 26 wickets at 25.77 and 274 runs at 34.25. During the seasons, Lindwall broke Ernie Jones' record of 209 wickets in Shield competitions in his 54th match in the competition.

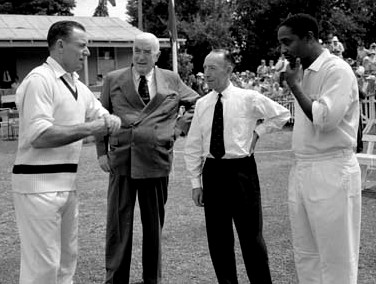
Lindwall (l) with (l to r) Australian prime minister Sir Robert Menzies, his former Test captain Lindsay Hassett and then West Indies' captain Frank Worrell at Manuka Oval in 1961.

During the winter of 1958, nearing his 37th birthday, Lindwall stepped up his bid to reclaim his Test place. He committed him to an intense fitness program that included a 5 km daily run followed by vigorous exercises to increase his abdominal and back strength. He set up equipment in his garage. Lindwall was determined to add to his Test tally of 212 wickets, which was just four behind the Australian record of Clarrie Grimmett. He was unmoved by a 6000-pound offer from an English newspaper to cover the 1958–59 Ashes series as a journalist, instead wanting to play in the series.

The fruit of Lindwall's fitness regime ripened in the early Shield matches of the 1958–59 season and he sent a message to the selectors when England arrived in Brisbane for a tour match before the First Test. Lindwall took 5/57 in the first innings, dismissing Watson, Milton, Colin Cowdrey, Trevor Bailey and Jim Laker. He removed both openers for seven in the second innings before rain curtailed the match, leaving Lindwall with match figures of 7/73. Unfortunately from his point of view, none of the selection committee attended the match. Lindwall was overlooked as the selectors persisted with the winning combination that toured South Africa. His prospects of a recall appeared even more remote after Australia won both of the first two Tests, with Davidson and Meckiff skittling England for 87 in the second innings of the Second Test, taking nine wickets each for the match. Meckiff was injured during the Third Test, leaving him in doubt for the Fourth Test. In the meantime, Lindwall had a Shield match away against South Australia to make a final claim for a recall. The hosts batted first in stifling heat around 42 degrees on a batting pitch, and Lindwall delivered 41 eight-ball overs to take 7/92. Lindwall received a standing ovation for his performances in unfavourable conditions and was greeted by Bradman, the chairman of selectors. Lindwall avoided Bradman's inquiries as to whether he had any injury worries, fearing it would hinder his chances of selection.

Lindwall was rewarded with a recall for the Fourth Test at the Adelaide Oval at the age of 37. After scoring 19 in Australia's first innings of 476, Lindwall was restored to his role of opening the bowling, this time with Davidson. He took match figures of 3/136 as Australia took a 3–0 lead. This left Lindwall one wicket short of Grimmett, with Meckiff recovered and ready to resume his place in the Fifth Test in Melbourne. The selectors retained Lindwall for the last match, instead dropping batsman Les Favell to accommodate Meckiff. Australia bowled first and Lindwall equalled Grimmett's record by having Bailey caught in the slips by Davidson. He took two difficult low slips catches but could not take the wicket that would move him ahead of Grimmett, finishing with 1/36. Lindwall opened the bowling in the second innings with 28,000 fans awaiting a new record. He beat Bailey with two outswingers in his first over before bowling him for a duck to move ahead of Grimmett. Lindwall took two further wickets to end with 3/37 as Australia completed a 4–0 series victory. Lindwall finished his resurgent season with 40 wickets at 20.55.

At the age of 38, Lindwall made his final appearances for Australia during the 1959–60 tour of the Indian subcontinent, which saw three and five Tests against Pakistan and India respectively. The tour was marred by illness and injury, allowing him to play in only half of the Tests. Lindwall played in two Tests against either nation with only moderate results: he took nine wickets at 38.22 and scored 38 runs at 12.66. Lindwall finished with 228 Test wickets, eight wickets behind Alec Bedser's then world record of 236 wickets. In his last Test innings, Lindwall scored ten, which took his tally to 1502 runs, making him the first player to score 1500 runs and take 200 wickets in Test cricket.

== Style ==
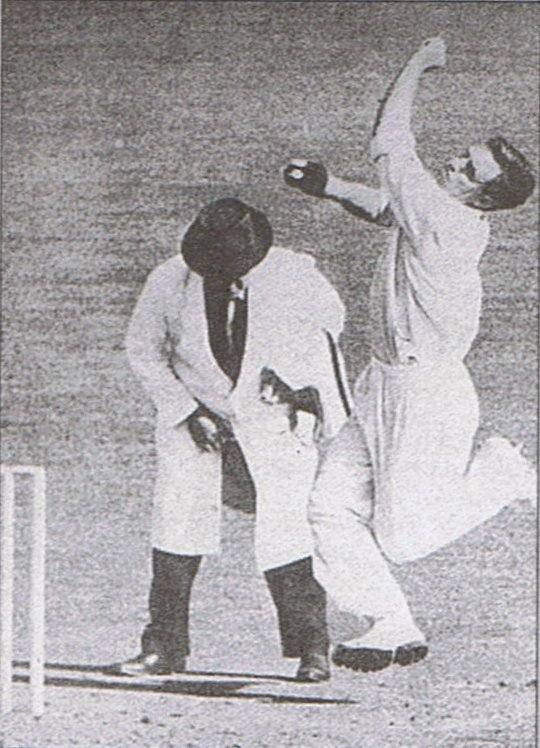
Ray Lindwall at full stretch

Lindwall, widely regarded as one of the greatest fast bowlers of all time, bowled with a classical and artistic side-on bowling action. David Frith wrote that "there was a balance, rhythmic run, a build-up" and an "ecstasy" in his smooth delivery action. Richie Benaud said that Lindwall was "technically the best fast bowler" that he ever saw. During the 1950s, Lindwall's action was copied by young children and a number of first-class Australian bowlers, including Ron Gaunt, John Power and Barry Fisher consciously copied his action. Alan Davidson, who succeeded Lindwall as Australia's pace spearhead, labelled him as "the best fast bowler I ever saw". Lindwall's childhood hero Harold Larwood rated Dennis Lillee to be equal to Lindwall "but not ahead of him". Following Lindwall's tour of England in 1953, his English counterpart Alec Bedser said that Lindwall was "the best fast bowler I've seen, because of his variety and control". Lindwall was particularly known for his trademark outswinger, which swung late and at high pace. Fred Trueman believed that Lindwall's ability to simultaneously swing the ball and at such pace and accuracy was matched only by himself and Wes Hall. Frank Tyson wrote that "he appears to be just jogging his fifteen yards up to the stumps – until the last couple of strides of his approach, when he suddenly explodes into his delivery stride...when he releases the ball, his bowling arm is so low that it borders on the round-arm". Lindwall's ability to swing the ball at high pace allowed him to repeatedly breach the defences of his opponents; of his 228 Test wickets, 98 were bowled and another 31 were leg before wicket. Lindwall's repertoire was reinforced with a dangerous yorker and bouncer, and changes of pace. As Tyson said "who is not 'Lindy's bunny' when he slots his yorker in the right spot?". In 1952 he developed an inswinger and then coupled it with his yorker, which homed into the feet of batsmen at high pace. Denis Compton said that Lindwall had the subtleties of a slow bowler, saying that he "raised what is considered to be the labouring force of cricket [fast bowling] to an artform with his tactical shrewdness, control and variations". Lindwall's emergence after the Second World War along with his new ball partner Keith Miller heralded a new era in cricket. The pair were regarded as the two best fast bowlers of their era, and signalled a change in the cricket landscape, which had been dominated during the interwar period by batsmen. Together the pair formed a new ball fast-bowling combination regarded as one of the best in Test history. During the 1948 tour of England, the hosts had agreed to have a new ball available every 55 overs, and the Australians used this to unleash Lindwall and Miller on the Englishmen with a shiny new ball. The pair often targeted the leading opposition batsmen, particular England's Len Hutton and Denis Compton with large amounts of short-pitched bowling, raising fast bowling to a new standard. Hutton's battles with Lindwall were regarded as one of the key match-ups in Anglo-Australian battles of the time, and Hutton said his opponent had the ability to "strike at will". Hutton felt that Lindwall's bouncers were the best that he faced, saying of their accuracy: "You had to play them or be hit". Lindwall refused to bowl bouncers at tailenders, saying that "If the day ever came when I have to bowl bouncers at tailenders then I won't deserve to play for Australia". When England developed quality pace bowlers of their own in the 1950s, Hutton was captain and he implemented a similar strategy to that executed by Lindwall and Miller. In retirement, Lindwall went on to mentor Lillee, who went on to break the Test world record for wicket-taking.

== Later years ==
Upon returning to Australia, Lindwall played in Queensland's final Shield match of the season, before retiring from representative cricket. However, he continued to play for Northern Districts in Brisbane's district competition, as well as making sporadic first-class appearances for private teams, which played in New Zealand, the West Indies, Rhodesia, Kenya and Pakistan.

Lindwall, Miller and Arthur Morris were the first beneficiaries of the New South Wales Cricket Association players' benefit payment plan, set up to reward New South Welshmen who had played for Australia in Tests. Lindwall was a Queensland selector for five seasons and an Australian selector from 1979–80 to 1982–83. He was given life membership of the Marylebone Cricket Club in 1960, the NSWCA is 1979 and the Queensland Cricket Association in 1991. In 1965, he received an MBE for his services to cricket. In retirement, he and his wife Peggy ran a florist's business after 1965. He and Peggy had two children, a son and a daughter. In the early 1970s, Lindwall mentored upcoming Western Australian paceman Dennis Lillee, who went on to hold the world record for Test wickets. After the Seventh Test in the 1970–71 Ashes series Lillee asked Keith Miller for Lindwall's address as "He might just be able to teach me how to bowl". He published two books, Flying Stumps in 1954 and The Challenging Tests in 1961. Lindwall died at age 74 at Greenslopes, Brisbane, Queensland. Lindwall was inducted into the Australian Cricket Hall of Fame in 1996 as one of the ten inaugural members. In 2000, he was named in the Australian Cricket Board's Team of the Century as one of its opening bowlers.

== Personal life ==
Lindwall was married to Peg, and together they had one son and one daughter. He died following a stroke, aged 74.

Lindwall, who became a florist after his cricket career, provided the wedding flowers for fellow Australian fast bowler Jeff Thomson, who would later share Lindwall's Australian Cricket Hall of Fame status in 2016.

== Test match performance ==
		Batting				Bowling			
Opposition	Matches	Runs	Average	High Score	100 / 50	Runs	Wickets	Average	Best (Inns)
England	29	795	22.08	100	1/4	2559	114	22.44	7/63
India	10	173	19.22	48*	0/0	725	36	20.13	7/38
New Zealand	1	0	0.00	0	0/0	29	2	14.50	1/14
Pakistan	3	29	7.25	23	0/0	186	4	46.50	2/72
South Africa	8	107	13.37	38*	0/0	631	31	20.35	5/32
West Indies	10	398	30.61	118	1/1	1121	41	27.34	6/95
Overall	61	1502	21.15	118	2/5	5251	228	23.03	7/38

== Notes ==
Sporting positions
Preceded by Ian Johnson	Australian Test cricket captains 1956/7	Succeeded by Ian Johnson
Preceded by Dattu Phadkar	Nelson Cricket Club; Professional; 1952	Succeeded by Dattu Phadkar
