= Jack Lindwall =

Australian rugby league footballer (1918–2000)

- Lindwall in 1948

Personal information
- Full name: John Edward Lindwall
- Born: 20 December 1918 Mascot, New South Wales, Australia
- Died: 17 June 2000 (aged 81) Connells Point,New South Wales, Australia

Playing information
- Position: Wing, Centre
Club
Years	Team	Pld	T	G	FG	P
1938–49	St. George	133	110	99	0	528
- Relatives: Ray Lindwall (brother)

Jack Lindwall (December 20, 1918 – June 17, 2000) was an Australian rugby league footballer who played in the 1930s and 1940s. A prolific try-scoring three-quarter back, he played his entire New South Wales Rugby Football League career with the St. George club. He is also the older brother of Australian Cricket Hall of Fame inaugural inductee and fellow rugby league player, Ray Lindwall.

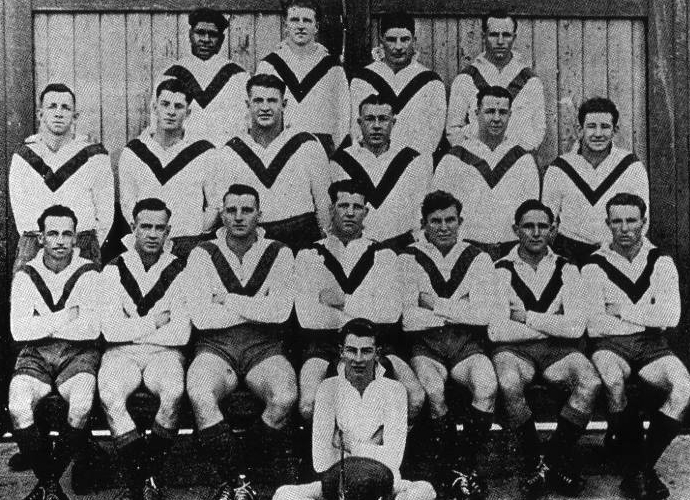
Lindwall (back row right) in StGeorge's 1946 side – minor premiers

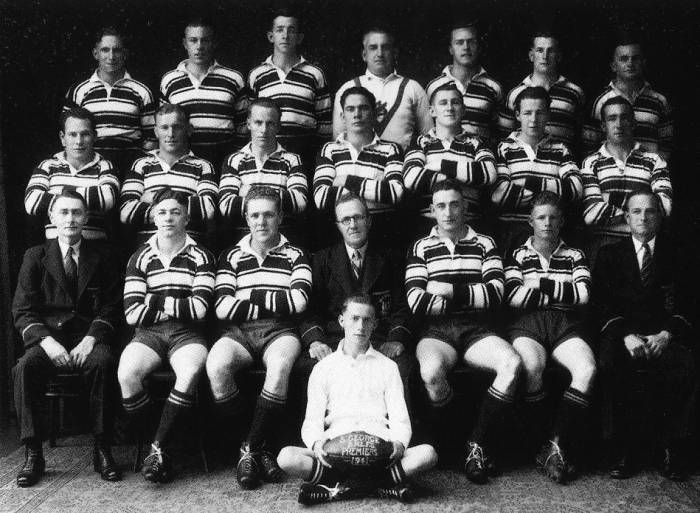
Lindwall (middle 3rd from left) in St. George's 1941 team – premiers

== Playing career ==
At St. George, Lindwall set records for both most tries and points in a match. He scored four or more tries in a match on five occasions, including six tries in a match against Manly-Warringah in 1947 where he also kicked nine goals, scoring an equal club record of 36 points in a match. He also played in St. George's Grand Final teams of 1942 and 1946 and retired as the club's all-time top try-scorer, a record not surpassed until the 1960s. He missed the 1941 grand final victory over Eastern Suburbs due to injury.

Lindwall was awarded Life Membership of the St. George Dragons in 1994. He died on 17 June 2000, aged 81.
