= Jack Bonnyman =

Australian rugby league footballer (1920–1980

Personal information
- Full name: Matthew Bernard John Bonnyman
- Born: 21 March 1920
- Died: 1 April 1980 (aged 60)

Playing information
- Position: Halfback
Club
Years	Team	Pld	T	G	FG	P
1940–44	Canterbury-Bankstown	58	15	0	0	45
Representative
Years	Team	Pld	T	G	FG	P
1939	New South Wales	2	1	1	0	5
1938–39	NSW Country	2	0	0	0	0
- Source: As of 20 February 2019

Matthew Bernard John Bonnyman (21 March 1920 – 1 April 1980) was an Australian rugby league footballer who played for Canterbury-Bankstown and New South Wales.

== Career ==
Bonnyman started his career at the Central-Newcastle Rugby League club. He was all set to join St. George Dragons, but changed his mind at the last minute and joined Canterbury-Bankstown.

He went on to play 5 seasons with Canterbury-Bankstown between 1940 and 1945. Bonnyman captained the Berries in their 24–14 loss to the Eastern Suburbs in the 1940 premiership final, although he did score a nice try during the match.

Success followed two years later when he played half-back in the victorious 1942 Grand Final Canterbury team that defeated the St. George Dragons 11–9.

He finished his career at Picton in the late 1940s.

== Representative career ==
Bonnyman represented Country Firsts in 1938 and New South Wales in 1939 - all before joining Canterbury-Bankstown in 1940.

== Death ==
Bonnyman died on 1 April 1980, at the age of 60.

== Accolades ==
He is recognised as Canterbury Bankstown player No. 64.

Bonnyman was selected in the 70th Anniversary Berries to Bulldogs Team of Champions.
