= Jack Hampstead =

Australian RL coach and former rugby league footballer

Personal information
- Full name: John Edward Hampstead
- Born: 10 May 1920 Sydney, New South Wales, Australia
- Died: 4 October 1992 (aged 72) Rozelle, New South Wales, Australia

Playing information
- Position: Lock
Club
Years	Team	Pld	T	G	FG	P
1940–50	Balmain	112	30	1	0	92

Coaching information
Club
Years	Team	Gms	W	D	L	W%
1953–54	Canterbury-Bankstown	36	13	2	21	36

Jack Hampstead (1920-1992) was an Australian professional rugby league footballer who played in the 1940s and 1950s, and coached in the 1950s. A New South Wales state representative lock forward, he played in Sydney's NSWRFL Premiership for the Balmain club. Hampstead later became coach of the Canterbury-Bankstown club. His grandson is National Rugby League former referee Sean Hampstead.

== Playing career ==
Born in Sydney, New South Wales, Hampstead played 108 first grade games between 1939 and 1951, playing Centre, and later lock. He played in the premiership-winning Balmain teams of 1944 and 1946.

== Coaching ==
For the 1953 season, Hampstead became the Canterbury-Bankstown coach. Of that year's eighteen matches, he won nine, and lost seven. However, in 1954 he lost fourteen of the eighteen, and won just four. He did not coach first-grade again.

Hampstead was a member of the Balmain Tigers' board until his death in 1992.
