= Eddie Burns =

Australian rugby league footballer and coach (1916-2004)

Personal information
- Full name: Ernest Edward Burns
- Born: 16 January 1916 Petersham, New South Wales, Australia
- Died: 30 June 2004 (aged 88)

Playing information
- Position: Prop
Club
| Years | Team | Pld | T | G | FG | P |
|---|---|---|---|---|---|---|
| 1935–40 | Canterbury-Bankstown | 147 | 13 | 0 | 0 | 39 |
| 1940 | Waratah Mayfield |
| 1941–50 | Canterbury-Bankstown | 65 | 47 | 8 | 0 | 157 |
| | Total | 212 | 60 | 8 | 0 | 196 |
Representative
| Years | Team | Pld | T | G | FG | P |
| 1948 | New South Wales | 2 | 0 | 0 | 0 | 0 |

Coaching information
Club
| Years | Team | Gms | W | D | L | W% |
| 1960–62 | Canterbury-Bankstown | 54 | 24 | 3 | 27 | 44 |
| 1965 | Canterbury-Bankstown | 18 | 5 | 0 | 13 | 28 |
| | Total | 72 | 29 | 3 | 40 | 40 |
Representative
| Years | Team | Gms | W | D | L | W% |
| 1964 | New South Wales | 2 | 2 | 0 | 0 | 100 |
| 1963 | NSW City | 1 | 1 | 0 | 0 | 100 |
- Source: As of 21 January 2020

Eddie Burns (16 January 1916 – 30 June 2004) was an Australian rugby league footballer and coach of the mid 20th century. A New South Wales representative prop-forward, he played for the Canterbury-Bankstown club of the NSWRFL Premiership, later becoming their coach.

== Playing career ==
While still a teenager, Burns played in the Canterbury-Bankstown club's first ever season in 1935 and was sent off in his first match. He played for 16 seasons in First Grade from 1935 to 1950. Eddie Burns played 212 first grade games and scored 196 career points in his long career. He won two premierships with Canterbury-Bankstown in 1938 and 1942. In 1948, Burns was selected to represent New South Wales playing 2 games. He retired in 1950 as the Canterbury club's top ever try-scorer, with 60, a record not bettered until Chris Anderson in 1978.

Burns is the 16th player to represent Canterbury-Bankstown.

== Coaching career ==
Burns's career as coach of Canterbury-Bankstown was subject to a two-year interruption when Clive Churchill was selected as the club's coach. He coached the club between 1960 and 1962 and again in 1965.

He coached New South Wales City Firsts in 1963 and the New South Wales rugby league team in 1964.

Burns co-managed the 1969 Australian touring team to New Zealand, along with Jack Lynch of Ipswich, Queensland.

== Accolades ==
In 1985, Burns was selected in Canterbury's 'Greatest Team Ever'. In 2004 he was selected in the 70 Year Canterbury-Bankstown team of champions. In 2015, he was the first player to be inducted into the Canterbury-Bankstown hall of fame.
