= Roy Kirkaldy =

Australian RL coach and former rugby league footballer

Personal information
- Full name: Roy Kenneth Kirkaldy
- Born: 26 March 1910 Newcastle, New South Wales, Australia
- Died: 13 August 1973 (aged 63) Sydney, New South Wales, Australia

Playing information
- Position: Hooker
Club
Years	Team	Pld	T	G	FG	P
1938–48	Canterbury-Bankstown	147	11	6	0	45
Representative
Years	Team	Pld	T	G	FG	P
1938–41	New South Wales	15	3	1	0	11
1938–41	NSW City	4	2	0	0	6
1933–37	NSW Country	4	0	0	0	0

Coaching information
Club
Years	Team	Gms	W	D	L	W%
1943	Canterbury-Bankstown	14	3	0	11	21

Roy Kirkaldy (26 March 1910 – 13 August 1973) was an Australian professional rugby league footballer who played in the 1930s and 1940s, and coached in the 1940s. He played for Canterbury-Bankstown and for the New South Wales Rugby League team.

== Background ==
Kirkaldy was born at Newcastle on 26 March 1910.

== Playing career ==
Kirkaldy represented NSW Country Firsts in 1933 and 1937. A hooker, he joined Canterbury in 1938 at the age of 28 having played for the Waratah Mayfield Club in Newcastle in his younger years. He went on to represent New South Wales on 11 occasions between 1938 and 1941. He won two premierships with Canterbury-Bankstown in 1938 and 1942. He played in two losing Grand Final sides in 1940 and 1946.

He also coached Canterbury-Bankstown in 1943. Kirkaldy was affectionately known as the Prince of Hookers. He was denied the opportunity to play for Australia because of the war.

After a long and successful career, Kirkaldy retired at the end of 1948 at the age of 38. League historian Alan Whiticker stated that many judges felt that Kirkaldy was "the greatest hooker since Sandy Pearce."

Kirkaldy was inducted into the Canterbury-Bankstown Hall of Fame in 2007. He was named as a reserve in the Bulldogs 70 Year Team of Champions in 2004. He died from cancer in 1973, aged 63.
