= Roger Pearman =

English RL coach and former rugby league & union footballer

Personal information
- Full name: Roger Pearman
- Born: 5 September 1939 (age 86) Wakefield, England, United Kingdom

Playing information

Rugby union
Club
Years	Team	Pld	T	G	FG	P
	Sandal RUFC	0	0	0	0	0
	Headingley RFC	0	0	0	0	0
	Total	0	0	0	0	0

Rugby league
- Position: Loose forward
Club
Years	Team	Pld	T	G	FG	P
1962–63	Wakefield Trinity
1964–66	Canterbury-Bankstown	19	3	0	0	9
	Total	19	3	0	0	9

Coaching information
Club
Years	Team	Gms	W	D	L	W%
1966	Canterbury-Bankstown	18	8	0	10	44
- As of 5 September 2025

Roger Pearman (born 5 September 1939) is an English rugby union and rugby league footballer who played in the 1960s, and coached rugby league in the 1960s. He played club level rugby union (RU) for Queen Elizabeth Grammar School, Sandal RUFC, Headingley, Loughborough University, and club level rugby league (RL) for Wakefield Trinity, and Canterbury-Bankstown, as a loose forward, and coached club level rugby league for Canterbury-Bankstown.

== Background ==
Roger Pearman's birth was registered in Wakefield district, West Riding of Yorkshire, England.

== Playing career ==
=== Challenge Cup Final appearances ===
Roger Pearman played loose forward in Wakefield Trinity ’s 25-10 victory over Wigan in the 1963 Challenge Cup Final during the 1962–63 season at Wembley Stadium, London on Saturday 11 May 1963, in front of a crowd of 84,492.

=== Australian career ===
He emigrated to Australia in 1964 and joined Canterbury-Bankstown as a loose forward. Roger was selected in first-grade upon his arrival and became the 300th player to play first-grade for the club. He went on to become a regular member of the team in his initial season.

== Coaching career ==
After an injury interrupted his 1965 season, Roger was appointed first-grade coach in 1966. He commenced the 1966 season in first-grade but forfeited his position to allow George Taylforth back into the team.

He played in third grade so that he could adequately prepare for the coaching role in first-grade. In 1967, Kevin Ryan was appointed captain-coach of first-grade.
