= Henry Porter (rugby league) =

Australian RL coach and former rugby league footballer

Personal information
- Full name: Rupert Henry Porter
- Born: 3 July 1910 Dungog, New South Wales, Australia
- Died: 5 February 1990 (aged 79)

Playing information
- Position: Prop
Club
Years	Team	Pld	T	G	FG	P
1933	Newtown	16	2	0	0	6
1936–48	Canterbury-Bankstown	138	7	18	0	57
	Total	154	9	18	0	63
Representative
Years	Team	Pld	T	G	FG	P
1935–41	New South Wales	20	2	1	0	8
1937–42	NSW City	6	3	0	0	9
1935	NSW Country	1	0	0	0	0
1945	Queensland	2	0	0	0	0

Coaching information
Club
Years	Team	Gms	W	D	L	W%
1949	Canterbury-Bankstown	18	6	2	10	33

Rupert Henry "Tarzan" Porter (1910–1990) was an Australian rugby league footballer who played in the 1930s and 1940s. He played club football for Newtown and Canterbury-Bankstown in the New South Wales Rugby Football League premiership, winning premierships with both clubs. He also played for Fortitude Valley in the Brisbane Rugby League premiership.

== Playing career ==
Born in Dungog on 3 July 1910, Porter won his first premiership with Newtown in 1933 when they defeated St. George Dragons in the final 18–5.

He played for New South Wales rugby league team in 1935, during his time at Goulburn. His first grade career stalled until 1936 when he joined Canterbury-Bankstown, where he played for 11 seasons: 1936–1942, 1944, and 1946–1948. Porter won two premierships with Canterbury-Bankstown in 1938 and 1942. He also played for New South Wales between 1938 and 1942.

He also played representative football for Queensland in two games in 1945. In World War II, Porter was based in Brisbane. He captained Canterbury-Bankstown on many occasions including in the 1947 Grand Final loss to Balmain 13–9. Porter also coached Canterbury-Bankstown in 1949.

== Post-playing ==
In 1985 he was inducted into Canterbury's 50th Anniversary, Greatest Team Ever. He died after a short illness in 1990. In 2004 he was inducted into Canterbury's 70th year Team of Champions. In 2007 he was inducted into the Canterbury Hall of Fame (Ring of Champions).
