= George Mason (rugby league) =

Australian rugby league footballer and coach

Personal information
- Full name: George Henry Mason
- Born: 8 October 1906 Alexandria, New South Wales, Australia
- Died: 5 February 1996 (aged 89)

Playing information
- Position: Five-eighth, Halfback
Club
Years	Team	Pld	T	G	FG	P
1927–29	Western Suburbs	31	5	0	0	15
1936	Canterbury-Bankstown	12	0	3	0	6
	Total	43	5	3	0	21

Coaching information
Club
Years	Team	Gms	W	D	L	W%
1937	Canterbury-Bankstown	8	4	0	4	50
- Source: As of 19 February 2019

George Mason (d 1996) was a rugby league footballer, and later coach, for the Canterbury-Bankstown club.

== Career ==
Mason played three seasons for Western Suburbs between 1927 and 1929.

His final year as a player was 1936 at the newly admitted Canterbury-Bankstown side playing in 12 matches.

Mason coached Canterbury-Bankstown for 1 season in 1937.

He is recognised as Canterbury's 41st ever player and their third ever coach. George Henry Mason died on 5 February 1996.
