= Jerry Brien =

Australian RL coach and former rugby league footballer

- Jerry Brien. 1929 St.George First Grade

Personal information
- Full name: Jerome Albert Brien
- Born: 8 December 1904 Newcastle, New South Wales, Australia
- Died: 11 September 1981 (aged 76)

Playing information
- Position: Halfback
Club
Years	Team	Pld	T	G	FG	P
1923–28	Western Suburbs	39	8	1	0	26
1929	St. George	4	0	0	0	0
	Total	43	8	1	0	26
Representative
Years	Team	Pld	T	G	FG	P
1925–28	New South Wales	3	0	0	0	0
1928	NSW City	1	0	0	0	0
1927	Metropolis	2	0	1	0	2

Coaching information
Club
Years	Team	Gms	W	D	L	W%
1937	Western Suburbs	8	3	0	5	38
1939	Canterbury-Bankstown	16	11	0	5	69
1942	Canterbury-Bankstown	16	11	0	5	69
	Total	40	25	0	15	63
Representative
Years	Team	Gms	W	D	L	W%
1947	New South Wales	0	0	0	0

Jerry Brien was an Australian rugby league footballer and coach. He played for Western Suburbs, St. George and for the New South Wales Rugby League team. He also coached the Canterbury-Bankstown club and Western Suburbs.

== Playing career ==
In 1925, Brien was chosen to play for New South Wales although he was only playing for the Western Suburbs reserve grade team, and had played just a handful of first grade games since his debut in 1923.

Brien represented NSW again in 1928, and was selected to represent Australia in the second test against England, but an injury suffered playing for Wests stopped him from making his international debut.

After six seasons with Western Suburbs, Brien joined St. George for 4 games in 1929.

== Coaching career ==
After his retirement as a player, Brien began coaching, including stints with South Grafton in 1932 & Cowra in 1933. In 1937, Brien returned to coach Western Suburbs for the eight games of the shortened season where they finished second last. In 1939, he took over as coach at Canterbury-Bankstown for a season, and returned to be at the helm when they won their second premiership in 1942.

By 1947, Brien was NSW coach and one of their selectors. Later, he became an Australian selector, but was dropped as a NSW selector in March 1951, making him ineligible to fill the national role.
