= Confraternity Carnival =

Australian rugby league competition

- Sport: Rugby league
- Instituted: 1980
- Number of teams: 64
- Country: Australia (QRL)
- Holders: Boys St Brendan's College, Yeppoon; Girls The Cathedral College, Rockhampton (2023)
- Most titles: St Brendan's College, Yeppoon (14 titles)
- Website: QISSRL Confraternity Carnival website
- Related competition: NRL Schoolboy Cup

The Confraternity Carnival, commonly referred to as Confro, is the premier rugby league competition for Catholic and independent secondary schools in Queensland, Australia, held annually since 1980. Administered by the Queensland Rugby League and run by the Queensland Independent Secondary Schools Rugby League, the competition is a week-long carnival that features over 1200 students from up to 54 schools in July each year.

In 2020 a Girls competition was introduced for the first time. However, this was cancelled in 2020 and cut short in 2021 due to COVID-19. The historic inaugural Girls winners were Marymount College in 2022.

The carnival has featured a number of current and former Australian and Queensland representatives, including Johnathan Thurston, Matthew Scott, Matthew Bowen, Bob Lindner, Xavier Coates, Wendell Sailor, Daly Cherry-Evans, Michael Morgan and Cameron Munster.

The most successful school is St Brendan's College, Yeppoon, while the current holders of the Confraternity Shield are Ignatius Park College, who won the competition in 2019 and 2022.

== History ==
In 1980, the first Confraternity Carnival was held in Bundaberg and featured just six teams. Prior to this, Christian Brothers schools from Bundaberg and Ipswich competed against each other for the Bunswich Shield. The first winners of the Confraternity Shield were Aquinas College, Ashmore, who also won the second carnival in 1981, becoming the first side to win back-to-back shields.

By 1990, the Carnival had grown to 21 teams. From 1988 to 1992, St Patrick's College, Mackay won the shield five times in a row, a record as of 2020. In 2006, 40 schools took part for the first time, growing to 48 in 2015. In 2013, Ignatius Park College became just the second school to win three straight shields.

In 2018, St Mary's Catholic College, Casino became the first New South Wales-based school to compete at the carnival. They were coached by former North Sydney Bears halfback Paul McCaffery.

On 3 April 2020, the Carnival was cancelled for the first time in its history due to COVID-19. The competition was set to take place at Brisbane's Iona College.

== Format ==
As of 2019, the format of the carnival sees the 48 schools divided into pools of four, with four pools making up the three divisions (either 1, 2 or 3). The schools play the other teams in their pool once before the finals begin. Which division a school is in determines which prize they compete for. Teams in Division 1 compete for the Confraternity Shield, the biggest prize of the carnival, and the Confraternity Trophy. Teams in Division 2 compete for the Confraternity Plate and the Confraternity Bowl, while teams in Division 3 compete for the Confraternity Cup and Challenge Trophy.

The first two days of the carnival are for the pool games and the quarter-finals. A rest day is then held before the semi-finals take place on day four. The final day then features the six Grand Finals, with the Shield game played last. Also on the final day, the team who didn't make the Grand Finals compete in consolation playoff finals.

Until 1988, the schools competed solely for the Shield. As more schools joined, more trophies were added. The first was the Confraternity Trophy, which is known as the Bob Lindner Trophy. Lindner was the first Carnival participant to represent Australia.

== Results ==
Year	Location	Winners
1980	Bundaberg	Aquinas College, Ashmore
1981	Ipswich	Aquinas College, Ashmore (2)
1982	Brisbane	St Brendan's College, Yeppoon
1983	Yeppoon	St Brendan's College, Yeppoon (2)
1984	Brisbane	Pauda College, Brisbane
1985	Bundaberg	St Brendan's College, Yeppoon (3)
1986	Cairns	Clairvaux MacKillop College, Brisbane
1987	Australia	St Brendan's College, Yeppoon (4)
1988	Brisbane	St Patrick's College, Mackay
1989	Toowoomba	St Patrick's College, Mackay (2)
1990	Yeppoon	St Patrick's College, Mackay (3)
1991	Charters Towers	St Patrick's College, Mackay (4)
1992	Brisbane	St Patrick's College, Mackay (5)
1993	Cairns	St Augustine's College, Cairns
1994	Rockhampton	St Mary's College, Toowoomba
1995	Toowoomba	St Mary's College, Toowoomba (2)
1996	Mackay	St Brendan's College, Yeppoon (5)
1997	Townsville	Pauda College, Brisbane (2)
1998	Ipswich	St Mary's College, Toowoomba (2)
1999	Rockhampton	St Teresa's College, Abergowrie
2000	Bundaberg	St Patrick's College, Mackay (6)
2001	Yeppoon	St Patrick's College, Mackay (7)
2002	Charters Towers	St Brendan's College, Yeppoon (6)
2003	Gold Coast	St Patrick's College, Mackay (8)
2004	Townsville	St Brendan's College, Yeppoon (7)
2005	Toowoomba	Pauda College, Brisbane (3)
2006	Brisbane	St Brendan's College, Yeppoon (8)
2007	Ipswich	St Brendan's College, Yeppoon (9)
2008	Rockhampton	Ignatius Park College, Townsville
2009	Bundaberg	St Brendan's College, Yeppoon (10)
2010	Brisbane	St Brendan's College, Yeppoon (11)
2011	Yeppoon	Ignatius Park College, Townsville (2)
2012	Shorncliffe	Ignatius Park College, Townsville (3)
2013	Townsville	Ignatius Park College, Townsville (4)
2014	Gold Coast	St Brendan's College, Yeppoon (12)
2015	Ipswich	St Brendan's College, Yeppoon (13)
2016	Rockhampton	Ignatius Park College, Townsville (5)
2017	Brisbane	Rockhampton Grammar School
2018	Charters Towers	St Mary's College, Toowoomba (3)
2019	Bundaberg	Ignatius Park College, Townsville (6)
2022	Mackay	Boys Ignatius Park College, Townsville (7) Girls Marymount College (1)
2023	Brisbane	Boys St Brendan's College, Yeppoon (14) Girls The Cathedral College, Rockhampton (1)
2024	Townsville	Boys Ignatius Park College, Townsville (8) Girls St Patrick's College, Mackay (1)
2025	Rockhampton	Boys St Patrick's College, Mackay (9) Girls The Cathedral College, Rockhampton (2)

=== Boys ===
School	Titles	Years won
St Brendan's College, Yeppoon	14	1982, 1983, 1985, 1987, 1996, 2002, 2004, 2006, 2007, 2009, 2010, 2014, 2015, 2023
St Patrick's College, Mackay	9	1988, 1989, 1990, 1991, 1992, 2000, 2001, 2003, 2025
Ignatius Park College, Townsville	8	2008, 2011, 2012, 2013, 2016, 2019, 2022, 2024
St Mary's College, Toowoomba	4	1994, 1995, 1998, 2018
Padua College, Brisbane	3	1984, 1997, 2005
Aquinas College, Ashmore	2	1980, 1981
Clairvaux MacKillop College, Brisbane	1	1986
Rockhampton Grammar School	1	2017
St Augustine's College, Cairns	1	1993
St Teresa's College, Abergowrie	1	1999

=== Girls ===
School	Titles	Years won
The Cathedral College, Rockhampton	2	2023, 2025
Marymount College, Gold Coast	1	2022
St Patrick's College, Mackay	1	2024

== Male Player of the Carnival ==
The Male Player of the Carnival is awarded to the most outstanding player in the competition. First awarded in 1982, past winners included future Australian and Queensland representatives Julian O'Neill, Wendell Sailor, Matthew Bowen and David Taylor.

Year	Player	School
1982	Paul Young	Aquinas College, Ashmore
1983	Gary Beddoes	St Edmund's College, Ipswich
1984	Anthony Griffin	Emmaus College, Rockhampton
1985	Gary Anderson	St Brendan's College, Yeppoon
1986	Clinton Peters	Mt Maria College, Mitchelton
1987	Andrew Schick	St Brendan's College, Yeppoon
1988	Allan Barrett	St Augustine's College, Cairns
1989	Julian O'Neill	St Brendan's College, Yeppoon
1990	Peter Phillips	St Patrick's College, Mackay
1991	Butch Fatnowna	St Patrick's College, Mackay
1992	Wendell Sailor	St Patrick's College, Mackay
1993	Cameron McNabb	St Augustine's College, Cairns
1994	Robert Bella	St Augustine's College, Cairns
1995	Shane Walker	St Mary's College, Toowoomba
1996	Chris Walker	St Mary's College, Toowoomba
1997	Danny Bampton	St Brendan's College, Yeppoon
1998	Ned Murphy	St Mary's College, Toowoomba
1999	Matthew Bowen	St Teresa's College, Abergowrie
2000	Grant Rovelli	St Patrick's College, Mackay
2001	Ryan Bartlett	St Augustine's College, Cairns
2002	Darren Rodgers	St Brendan's College, Yeppoon
2003	Danny Williams	St Patrick's College, Mackay
2004	Jamie Simpson	St Brendan's College, Yeppoon
2005	David Taylor	St Brendan's College, Yeppoon
2006	Ben Barba	St Patrick's College, Mackay
2007	Jayden Maua'i	Clairvaux MacKillop College, Brisbane
2008	Jay Lobwein	Ignatius Park College, Townsville
2009	Maipele Morseu	St Brendan's College, Yeppoon
2010	Sam Foster	Ignatius Park College, Townsville
2011	Andrew Shipway	St Brendan's College, Yeppoon
2012	Kieran Quabba	Ignatius Park College, Townsville
2013	Josh Berkers	Marymount College, Burleigh
2014	Brayden Josephs	St Mary's College, Toowoomba
2015	Bailey Butler	St Brendan's College, Yeppoon
2016	Lochlyn Sheldon	Aquinas College, Ashmore
2017	Ben Condon	Rockhampton Grammar School
2018	Jake Simpkin	St Mary's College, Toowoomba
2019	Charlie Murray	Marymount College, Burleigh
2020	None	Carnival cancelled (COVID-19)
2021	None	Carnival cancelled (COVID-19)
2022	Jamal Shibasaki	Ignatius Park College, Townsville
2023	Cooper Bai	Marymount College, Burleigh
2024	Harrison Hill	St. Brendan's College, Yeppoon
2025	Damon Humphrys	Padua College, Kedron

== Female Player of the Carnival ==
The Female Player of the Carnival is awarded to the most outstanding female player in the competition. It was first awarded in 2022 with Lillian Yarrow named as the inaugural recipient.

Year	Player	School
2022	Lillian Yarrow	Emmaus College, Rockhampton
2023	Caitlin Tanner	The Cathedral College, Rockhampton
2024	Bronte Parker	Marymount College, Gold Coast
2025	Josie Wogand	The Cathedral College, Rockhampton

== See also ==
- NRL Schoolboy Cup
- Australian Schoolboys rugby league team
