= 2009 Bulldogs RLFC season =

← 2008	2010 →

The 2009 Bulldogs RLFC season was the 75th in the club's history. They competed in the NRL's 2009 Telstra Premiership, finishing the regular season 2nd (out of 16), a vast improvement on the previous season, when they came last. The Bulldogs came within one match of the grand final but were knocked out by the Parramatta Eels.

== Season summary ==
After a poor 2008 season, in which the club finished bottom of the league, 2009 saw a number of new signings, including Brett Kimmorley, Josh Morris, Michael Ennis, David Stagg and Ben Hannant, along with mid-season signing Greg Eastwood.

== Fixtures ==
During the regular season, the Bulldogs will play most home games at ANZ Stadium in Homebush Bay. ANZ Stadium is also the home ground of the South Sydney Rabbitohs, and one of the home grounds of the Parramatta Eels, so Bulldogs away matches against these two teams will also be played at this venue. Two Bulldogs home games will be played away from Homebush Bay: the Round 11 match against Melbourne will be played at Bluetongue Stadium in Gosford, and the Round 19 match against the Gold Coast will be played at Suncorp Stadium in Brisbane.

=== Trial Matches ===
Trial 1
21 February 2009
7:00pm Local

St. George Illawarra Dragons	24–12	Bulldogs
Tries: Cooper, Nightingale, Thorby, Clarke; Goals: Soward 4/4		Tries: Utai, Barba; Goals: El Masri 1/1, Ennis 1/1

WIN Stadium, Wollongong
Attendance: 7,628

Trial 2
28 February 2009
8:00pm Local

Bulldogs	24–16	Canberra Raiders
Tries: Goodwin, Ennis, Patten, Armit; Goals: Ennis 3/3, El Masri 1/1		Tries: Monaghan 2, Purtell; Goals: Campese 2/3

Meakin Park, Brisbane

=== Regular season ===
Round 1
14 March 2009
7:30pm Local

Bulldogs	34–12	Manly-Warringah Sea Eagles
Tries: Goodwin 2, Idris 2, Morris; Goals: El Masri 7/7		Tries: Ballin, Lyon; Goals: Orford 2/2

ANZ Stadium, Homebush Bay
Attendance: 19,791
Referee: Cummins, Suttor

Round 2
21 March 2009
7:30pm Local

Penrith Panthers	26–28	Bulldogs
Tries: Waterhouse 2, Aiton, Tighe; Goals: Gordon 5/5		Tries: Eastwood, Idris, Kimmorley, Roberts, Stagg; Goals: El Masri 4/5

CUA Stadium, Penrith
Attendance: 16,846
Referee: Cecchin, James

Round 3
27 March 2009
7:35pm Local

Gold Coast Titans	20–12	Bulldogs
Tries: Campbell, O'Dwyer, Rogers, Tonga; Goals: Rogers 2/5		Tries: Goodwin, Ryan; Goals: El Masri 2/3

Skilled Park, Gold Coast
Attendance: 19,854
Referee: Maxwell, Shortall

Round 4
5 April 2009
2:00pm Local

Bulldogs	24–12	Cronulla-Sutherland Sharks
Tries: El Masri, Goodwin, Morris, Ryan; Goals: El Masri 4/4		Tries: Gallen, Tupou; Goals: Covell 2/2

ANZ Stadium, Homebush Bay
Attendance: 15,520
Referee: Robinson, Sutton

Round 5
13 April 2009
7:00pm Local

Bulldogs	14–12	South Sydney Rabbitohs
Tries: Morris, Ryan; Goals: El Masri 2/2, Ennis 1/1		Tries: Champion, Pettybourne; Goals: Luke 1/1, Sandow 1/1

ANZ Stadium, Homebush Bay
Attendance: 22,775
Referee: Klein, Suttor

Round 6
19 April 2009
3:00pm Local

Parramatta Eels	18–48	Bulldogs
Tries: Hauraki 2, Hayne; Goals: Burt 3/3		Tries: Morris 2, Patten 2, El Masri, Goodwin, Hodgson, Kimmorley, Warburton; Goals: El Masri 6/9

ANZ Stadium, Homebush Bay
Attendance: 18,223
Referee: Badger, De Las Heras

Round 7
26 April 2009
2:00pm Local

Canberra Raiders	20–30	Bulldogs
Tries: Monaghan, Purtell, Thompson, Tongue; Goals: Dugan 2/4		Tries: El Masri, Ennis, Goodwin, Hannant, Millard; Goals: El Masri 5/5

Canberra Stadium, Canberra
Attendance: 10,241
Referee: James, Klein

Round 8
3 May 2009
3:00pm Local

Bulldogs	22–20	Wests Tigers
Tries: El Masri 2, Ennis, Goodwin; Goals: El Masri 3/4		Tries: Moltzen, Payten, Ryan 2 Goals: Gallant 2/5

ANZ Stadium, Homebush Bay
Attendance: 25,622
Referee: Hayne, De Las Heras

Round 9
9–11 May 2009

.	Bye	.

Round 10
16 May 2009
7:30pm Local

St. George Illawarra Dragons	20–18	Bulldogs
Tries: Creagh, Poore, Weyman; Goals: Soward 4/4		Tries: Hannant, Idris, Kimmorley; Goals: El Masri 3/3

Jubilee Oval, Kogarah
Attendance: 18,415
Referee: Archer, Klein

Round 11
22–25 May 2009
7:30pm Local

Bulldogs	26–10	Melbourne Storm

Bluetongue Stadium, Gosford

Round 12
29 May - 1 June 2009
3:00pm Local

Newcastle Knights	22–14	Bulldogs

EnergyAustralia Stadium, Newcastle

Round 13
5–8 June 2009

.	Bye	.

Round 14
12–15 June 2009
7:35pm Local

Brisbane Broncos	22–44	Bulldogs

Suncorp Stadium, Brisbane
Player of the Match: Ben Roberts (BUL)

Round 15
19–22 June 2009
7:35pm Local

Bulldogs	19–12	Penrith Panthers

ANZ Stadium, Homebush Bay

Round 16
26–29 June 2009
7:35pm Local

Bulldogs	30–18	North Queensland Cowboys

ANZ Stadium, Homebush Bay

Round 17
3–6 July 2009
7:35pm Local

Manly-Warringah Sea Eagles	19–12	Bulldogs

Brookvale Oval, Brookvale

Round 18
10–13 July 2009
2:00pm Local

New Zealand Warriors	14–18	Bulldogs

Mt Smart Stadium, Auckland

Round 19
17–20 July 2009
8:30pm Local

Bulldogs	23–16	Gold Coast Titans

Suncorp Stadium, Brisbane

Round 20
24–27 July 2009
5:30pm Local

Bulldogs	8–27	Parramatta Eels

ANZ Stadium, Homebush Bay

Round 21
31 July - 3 August 2009
3:00pm Local

South Sydney Rabbitohs	18–26	Bulldogs

ANZ Stadium, Homebush Bay

Round 22
7–10 August 2009
7:30pm Local

Bulldogs	23–20	Canberra Raiders

ANZ Stadium, Homebush Bay

Round 23
14–17 August 2009
7:35pm Local

North Queensland Cowboys	12–22	Bulldogs

Dairy Farmers Stadium, Townsville

Round 24
21–24 August 2009
7:00pm Local

Bulldogs	28–4	Sydney Roosters

ANZ Stadium, Homebush Bay

Round 25
28–31 August 2009
3:00pm Local

Bulldogs	40–20	New Zealand Warriors

ANZ Stadium, Homebush Bay
Attendance: 41,835 (record crowd)

Round 26
4–6 September 2009
7:35pm Local

Wests Tigers	34–12	Bulldogs

Sydney Football Stadium, Moore Park

=== Finals Series ===
Qualifying Final
12 September 2009
8:35pm Local

Bulldogs	26–12	Newcastle Knights

ANZ Stadium, Homebush Bay

Preliminary Final
25 September 2009
7:45pm Local

Bulldogs	12–22	Parramatta Eels

ANZ Stadium, Homebush Bay

== Ladder ==
2009 NRL season
Pos	Team	Pld	W	D	L	B	PF	PA	PD	Pts
1	St. George Illawarra Dragons	24	17	0	7	2	548	329	+219	38
2	Canterbury-Bankstown Bulldogs	24	18	0	6	2	575	428	+147	38^{1}
3	Gold Coast Titans	24	16	0	8	2	514	467	+47	36
4	Melbourne Storm	24	14	1	9	2	505	348	+157	33
5	Manly-Warringah Sea Eagles	24	14	0	10	2	549	459	+90	32
6	Brisbane Broncos	24	14	0	10	2	511	566	−55	32
7	Newcastle Knights	24	13	0	11	2	508	491	+17	30
8	Parramatta Eels	24	12	1	11	2	476	473	+3	29
9	Wests Tigers	24	12	0	12	2	558	483	+75	28
10	South Sydney Rabbitohs	24	11	1	12	2	566	549	+17	27
11	Penrith Panthers	24	11	1	12	2	515	589	−74	27
12	North Queensland Cowboys	24	11	0	13	2	558	474	+84	26
13	Canberra Raiders	24	9	0	15	2	489	520	−31	22
14	New Zealand Warriors	24	7	2	15	2	377	565	−188	20
15	Cronulla-Sutherland Sharks	24	5	0	19	2	359	568	−209	14
16	Sydney Roosters	24	5	0	19	2	382	681	−299	14

^{1} The Bulldogs were deducted 2 competition points after an interchange breach in Round 2.

== 2009 squad ==
No.

Position
Player

Chris Armit – PR Ben Barba – FE Brent Crisp – FB Greg Eastwood – SR Hazem El Masri – WG Michael Ennis – HK Bryson Goodwin – WG Yileen Gordon – SR Ben Hannant – PR Jarrad Hickey – PR Michael Hodgson – PR Daniel Holdsworth – FE Jamal Idris – CE Brett Kimmorley – HB John Kite – PR

No.

Position
Player

Charles Leaneo – PR Daryl Millard – CE Brad Morrin – SR Josh Morris – CE Heka Nanai – WG Luke Patten – FB Ben Roberts – FE Andrew Ryan – SR (c) David Stagg – LK Michael Sullivan – HK Lee Te Maari – SR Matt Utai – WG Gary Warburton – SR Danny Williams – PR Tim Winitana – CE

== See also ==
- List of Canterbury-Bankstown Bulldogs seasons
