= 2008 Bulldogs RLFC season =

← 2007	2009 →

The 2008 Bulldogs RLFC season was the 74th in the club's history. They competed in the NRL's 2008 Telstra Premiership, finishing in last place.

== Season summary ==
High-profile player departures and political infighting during the 2007–2008 off-season had led to predictions that the Bulldogs would have a difficult 2008, predictions which were borne out across the season. The club languished towards the bottom of the ladder throughout the year, suffering heavy losses against many teams, the most notable being a 46–0 loss to the Melbourne Storm, a 58–18 loss to the Canberra Raiders and a 56–4 loss against the Wests Tigers, breaking records. The key problems for the Bulldogs were poor defence and continuing injury problems, with usually 10 first grade players injured at a time, including season ending injuries to key players Luke Patten and Willie Tonga. After the club's 58–18 thrashing at the hands of the Raiders in Round 15, coach Steve Folkes admitted that the Bulldogs were "at the bottom of a fairly big hole with no way out of it in the short term". Folkes' men would only win one more game in the entire season, and finished 2008 with the wooden spoon in what was Folkes' final year with the club. It was the Bulldogs' first wooden spoon since 1964, discounting 2002 when it breached the salary cap and were stripped of all competition points.

On the field the Bulldogs suffered a season of unrelenting disappointment, leading to just five wins for the entire season. Other than the record-breaking losses already mentioned above, the Bulldogs suffered its first loss against St. George Illawarra since 2003, and lost twice against the Sydney Roosters, Parramatta Eels (in the first meeting the Bulldogs had a 20–0 halftime lead but somehow lost 28–20), Penrith Panthers and Canberra Raiders throughout the course of the season. The loss to the Roosters in particular was made bitter notably because Willie Mason and Mark O'Meley were playing against the Bulldogs for the first time. The Bulldogs however did win two of their opening three matches against the South Sydney Rabbitohs and Wests Tigers, raising optimism amongst fans. The other three wins were against those that would make the finals: the Dragons in round six, the Sharks in round 11 and the Broncos at Suncorp Stadium in round 18. No more wins would follow for the season. The Bulldogs' highest score for the season in a single match was 34 when it lost for the second time to Canberra, 52–34. Their highest in a winning match was 32, when it defeated the Wests Tigers in round 3, by 32–12. Further souring the Bulldogs' season of shame, Sonny Bill Williams left the club without warning late in July to pursue a career in rugby union (read more below).

The team also faced off-field turbulence. Throughout May and June, there was heavy media coverage of star player Sonny Bill Williams' discontent with Bulldogs management and with his contract arrangements, and of his rumoured desire to leave the club to play rugby union or in the Super League. After confirming that he would play out the remaining 4 years of his contract, Williams left the country without warning in late July to join French rugby union club RC Toulon, in what many rugby league fans regarded as an enormous betrayal. The Bulldogs commenced legal action against Williams for breach of contract, and eventually received substantial compensation for the walkout.

== Match results ==
ANZ Stadium is a home ground of five NRL teams (the Bulldogs as well as South Sydney Rabbitohs, Wests Tigers, St George Illawarra Dragons and Parramatta Eels), and therefore the Bulldogs are not officially classified as the home team at every match they play there. ANZ Stadium matches at which the Bulldogs are classified as the home team are highlighted in bold.

Round	Opponent	Result	Bulldogs	Opponent	Date	Venue	Crowd	Position
Trial Match	St George Illawarra Dragons	Loss	30	40	23 February	WIN Stadium		
Trial Match	Penrith Panthers	**Win**	36	18	2 March	ANZ Stadium		
1	Parramatta Eels	Loss	20	28	15 March	ANZ Stadium	25,065	10th
2	South Sydney Rabbitohs	**Win**	25	12	21 March	ANZ Stadium	21,839	8th
3	Wests Tigers	**Win**	32	12	30 March	**ANZ Stadium**	21,456	2nd
4	Sydney Roosters	Loss	20	40	4 April	**ANZ Stadium**	36,526	8th
5	New Zealand Warriors	Loss	16	36	13 April	Mt Smart Stadium	15,912	11th
6	St George Illawarra Dragons	**Win**	30	18	19 April	**ANZ Stadium**	14,764	
7	Manly-Warringah Sea Eagles	Loss	22	30	26 April	Brookvale Oval	15,229	
8	Bye							
9	Penrith Panthers	Loss	4	30	10 May	**ANZ Stadium**	10,257	14th
10	Gold Coast Titans	Loss	20	24	16 May	Skilled Park	22,676	14th
11	Cronulla Sharks	**Win**	30	22	26 May	**ANZ Stadium**	9,289	13th
12	Melbourne Storm	Loss	0	46	31 May	Olympic Park Stadium	12,251	14th
13	Newcastle Knights	Loss	12	22	7 June	**ANZ Stadium**	9,565	14th
14	Bye							
15	Canberra Raiders	Loss	18	58	21 June	**ANZ Stadium**	9,845	
16	Sydney Roosters	Loss	14	24	27 June	Sydney Football Stadium	9,271	
17	South Sydney Rabbitohs	Loss	30	34	7 July	**ANZ Stadium**	15,562	15th
18	Brisbane Broncos	**Win**	26	18	13 July	Suncorp Stadium	37,683	15th
19	New Zealand Warriors	Loss	22	40	19 July	**ANZ Stadium**	12,973	15th
20	St George Illawarra Dragons	Loss	0	30	25 July	ANZ Stadium	7,802	15th
21	Wests Tigers	Loss	4	56	3 August	ANZ Stadium		15th
22	North Queensland Cowboys	Loss	12	36	9 August	**Suncorp Stadium**	8,549	15th
23	Penrith Panthers	Loss	16	52	16 August	CUA Stadium	7,841	15th
24	Parramatta Eels	Loss	12	26	23 August	**ANZ Stadium**	27,564	15th
25	Brisbane Broncos	Loss	22	36	31 August	**ANZ Stadium**	7,685	16th
26	Canberra Raiders	Loss	34	52	7 September	Canberra Stadium		16th

== Season ladder ==
2008 NRL season
Pos	Team	Pld	W	D	L	B	PF	PA	PD	Pts
1	Melbourne Storm	24	17	0	7	2	584	282	+302	38
2	Manly Warringah Sea Eagles (P)	24	17	0	7	2	645	355	+290	38
3	Cronulla-Sutherland Sharks	24	17	0	7	2	451	384	+67	38
4	Sydney Roosters	24	15	0	9	2	511	446	+65	34
5	Brisbane Broncos	24	14	1	9	2	560	452	+108	33
6	Canberra Raiders	24	13	0	11	2	640	527	+113	30
7	St George Illawarra Dragons	24	13	0	11	2	489	378	+111	30
8	New Zealand Warriors	24	13	0	11	2	502	567	-65	30
9	Newcastle Knights	24	12	0	12	2	516	486	+30	28
10	Wests Tigers	24	11	0	13	2	528	560	-32	26
11	Parramatta Eels	24	11	0	13	2	501	547	-46	26
12	Penrith Panthers	24	10	1	13	2	504	611	-107	25
13	Gold Coast Titans	24	10	0	14	2	476	586	-110	24
14	South Sydney Rabbitohs	24	8	0	16	2	453	666	-213	20
15	North Queensland Cowboys	24	5	0	19	2	474	638	-164	14
16	Canterbury-Bankstown Bulldogs	24	5	0	19	2	433	782	-349	14

== Scorers ==
For NRL first-grade matches only.

Player	Tries	Goals	Field goals	Points	Played
Hazem El Masri	6	44	0	112	18
Heka Nanai	8	0	0	32	15
Tim Winitana	8	0	0	32	19
Daniel Holdsworth	4	5	1	27	17
Matthew Utai	6	0	0	24	9
Luke Patten	4	0	0	16	7
Andrew Ryan	4	0	0	16	21
Willie Tonga	3	0	0	12	7
Arana Taumata	3	0	0	12	5
Brent Crisp	1	3	0	10	2
Ben Roberts	2	0	0	8	18
Reni Maitua	2	0	0	8	14
Corey Hughes	2	0	0	8	19
Cameron Phelps	1	0	0	4	3
Nick Youngquest	1	0	0	4	4
Andrew Emelio	1	0	0	4	2
Daryl Millard	1	0	0	4	12
Lee Te Maari	1	0	0	4	20
Danny Williams	1	0	0	4	8
Ben Barba	1	0	0	4	4
Fred Briggs	0	0	0	0	9
TOTAL	64	52	1	333	

Stats to the end of Round 23, NRL, 2008

== Squad ==
Fullbacks	Wingers	Centres	Five-Eighths	Half-Backs	Second Rowers	Props	Hookers	Locks
Luke Patten	Hazem El Masri	Willie Tonga	Daniel Holdsworth	Ben Roberts	Andrew Ryan	Jarrad Hickey	Corey Hughes	Reni Maitua
Brent Crisp	Heka Nanai	Tim Winitana	Joe Williams	Aaron Groom	Brad Morrin	Kane Cleal	Michael Sullivan	Lee Te Maari
Nick Youngquest	Matthew Utai	Daryl Millard		Ben Barba	Nick Kouparitsas	Danny Williams		
					Gary Warburton	Chris Armit		
						Justin Tsoulos		

Bold Players have played International or State any year

== Player movements ==
=== Gains 2009 ===
Name	Signed from	Contract Details
Joe Williams	Penrith Panthers	Joined Mid 2008
Nick Youngquest	Wests Tigers	Joined Mid 2008
Josh Morris	St. George Illawarra Dragons	3 Years
Brett Kimmorley	Cronulla Sharks	2 Years
Ben Hannant	Brisbane Broncos	3 Years
Michael Ennis	Brisbane Broncos	3 Years
David Stagg	Brisbane Broncos	3 Years
Greg Eastwood	Brisbane Broncos	1 Year
Michael Hodgson	Gold Coast Titans	2 Years

=== Losses 2009 ===
Name	Signed With	Contract Details
Cameron Phelps	Wigan Warriors	Left Mid 2008
Willie Tonga	North Queensland Cowboys	4 Years
Corey Hughes	Cronulla Sharks	1 Year
Sonny Bill Williams	RC Toulon	2 Years

=== Off Contract at end of 2009 ===
Name	Contract Details

=== Off Contract at end of 2010 ===
Name	Contract Details

=== Off Contract at end of 2011 ===
Name	Contract Details

== See also ==
- List of Canterbury-Bankstown Bulldogs seasons
