= 2010 New South Wales Cup =

- League: New South Wales Cup
- Teams: 12
- Premiers: Canterbury-Bankstown Bulldogs
- Runners-up: Windsor Wolves
- Minor Premiers: Canterbury-Bankstown Bulldogs

The 2010 New South Wales Cup was the 103rd season of New South Wales's top-level statewide rugby league competition. The competition was contested by 12 teams over a 30-week season (including finals), which concluded with the 2010 Grand Final at ANZ Stadium in Sydney.

== Competition changes ==
Following the 2009 season, Canterbury-Bankstown Bulldogs would rejoin the competition after winning the premiership competing as the Bankstown City Bulls. NRL team Melbourne Storm ended their association with the Central Coast Storm, forming their own team for the 2010 season. Central Coast would remain in the competition with the assistance of the Newcastle Knights as the Central Coast Centurions, thus expanding the competition to 12 teams.

== Season summary ==
Canterbury-Bankstown Bulldogs would claim the minor premiership on the final day of the season, thrashing Melbourne Storm 66–12 to secure the title on points difference from Balmain Ryde-Eastwood Tigers. North Sydney Bears finished with the wooden spoon, having won only five games for the season.

== Ladder ==
2010 New South Wales Cup
Pos	Team	Pld	W	D	L	B	PF	PA	PD	Pts
1	Canterbury-Bankstown Bulldogs (P)	25	20	0	5	0	846	487	369	40
2	Balmain Ryde-Eastwood Tigers	25	20	0	5	0	697	482	215	40
3	Newtown Jets	25	19	1	6	0	694	561	133	39
4	Windsor Wolves	25	15	0	10	0	776	608	168	32
5	Western Suburbs Magpies	25	15	1	10	0	655	542	113	31
6	Wentworthville Magpies	25	12	1	13	0	780	705	75	25
7	Melbourne Storm	25	11	0	14	0	627	727	-100	22
8	Cronulla Sharks	25	8	1	16	0	687	672	15	17
9	Auckland Vulcans	25	8	0	17	0	642	847	-205	16
10	Central Coast Centurions	25	7	0	18	0	678	868	-190	14
11	Shellharbour Dragons	25	7	0	18	0	544	734	-190	14
12	North Sydney Bears	25	5	0	20	0	471	864	-393	10

== Finals series ==
Home	Score	Away	Match Information
Home	Score	Away	Date and Time (local)	Venue
Qualifying finals
Newtown Jets	32 – 28	Wentworthville Magpies	Saturday 11 September 2010, 3:00pm	Henson Park
Windsor Wolves	16 – 40	Western Suburbs Magpies	Saturday 11 September 2010, 3:00pm	Windsor Sports Complex
Canterbury-Bankstown Bulldogs	30 – 18	Cronulla Sharks	Saturday 11 September 2010, 3:00pm	Belmore Sports Ground
Balmain Ryde-Eastwood Tigers	48 – 18	Melbourne Storm	Saturday 11 September 2010, 3:00pm	Leichhardt Oval
Semi-finals
Western Suburbs Magpies	20 – 14	Wentworthville Magpies	Sunday 19 September 2010, 1:00pm	Leichhardt Oval
Newtown Jets	18 – 34	Windsor Wolves	Sunday 19 September 2010, 3:00pm	Leichhardt Oval
Preliminary Finals
Balmain Ryde-Eastwood Tigers	26 – 32	Windsor Wolves	Sunday 26 September 2010, 1:00pm	Leichhardt Oval
Canterbury-Bankstown Bulldogs	32 – 24	Western Suburbs Magpies	Sunday 26 September 2010, 3:00pm	Leichhardt Oval
Grand Final
Canterbury-Bankstown Bulldogs	24 – 12	Windsor Wolves	Sunday 3 October 2010, 12:00pm	ANZ Stadium

== Grand Final ==
Minor premiers Canterbury won the Grand Final on the back of a strong performance from Josh Reynolds who scored two tries and set up a third. The Bulldogs dominated the first half, scoring 16 unanswered points, setting up the victory with a strong defensive display. Windsor playmaker Maurice Blair was forced from the field early in the second half after suffering a suspected broken jaw, after fighting with Bulldogs interchange player Corey Payne. The second half was played in heavy rain, and Windsor threatened to come back into the contest with 20 minutes remaining when Jesse Sene-Lefao caught a pinpoint Craig Trindall kick, but the contest was over when Reynolds scored his second try from a 90-metre intercept.

2010 New South Wales Cup Grand Final

Sunday, 3 October
12:00 AEST (UTC+10)

Canterbury-Bankstown Bulldogs	24 – 12	Windsor Wolves
Tries: 4 Reynolds; Cutler; Jack; Goals: 4 Reynolds (4/5)	1st: 16–0; 2nd: 8–12; Report	Tries: 2 Sene-Lefao; Tangata-Toa; Goals: 2 Trindall (2/2); Sin bin: Sweeney

ANZ Stadium
Referee: David Munro

Team details

Canterbury-Bankstown Bulldogs
FB	1	Trent Cutler (c)
WG	2	Heka Nanai
CE	3	Shane Neumann
CE	4	Daniel Rauicava
WG	5	Junior Tia Kilifi
FE	6	Rhys Jack
HB	7	Josh Reynolds
PR	8	Brad Morrin
HK	9	Nathan Smith
PR	10	Tim Browne
SR	11	Daniel Harrison
SR	12	Yileen Gordon
LK	13	Danny Williams
Interchange:
BE	14	Corey Payne
BE	15	Harlan Ala'alatoa
BE	16	Conrad Ta'akimoeaka
BE	17	Kose Lelei
Coach:
Justin Holbrook

Windsor Wolves
FB	1	Zoram Watene
WG	2	David Simmons
CE	3	Ryan Walker
CE	4	Michael Mate
WG	5	Sandor Earl
FE	6	Maurice Blair
HB	7	Craig Trindall (c)
PR	16	David Tangata-Toa
HK	13	Josh Bateman
PR	10	Aaron Sweeney
SR	11	Joseph Paulo
SR	20	Daniel Penese
LK	12	Nigel Plum
Interchange:
BE	8	Steve Meredith
BE	9	Ryan Russell
BE	17	Jesse Sene-Lefao
BE	19	Brendan Vengoa
Coach:
Guy Missio

== See also ==
- 2010 NRL season
- 2010 Queensland Cup
