= Jay Lobwein =

Australian rugby league footballer

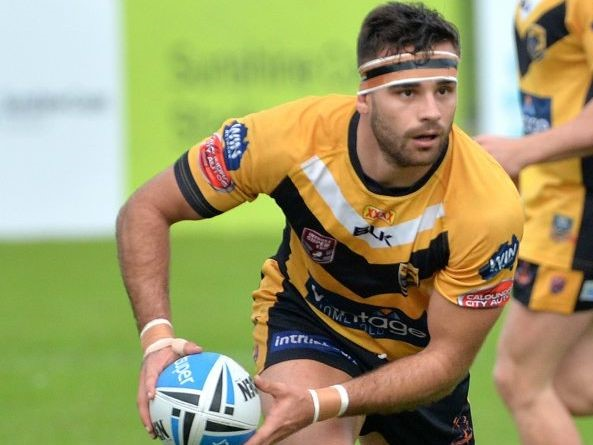

Personal information
- Full name: Jay William Lobwein
- Born: 13 April 1992 (age 34) Toowoomba, Queensland, Australia
- Height: 178 cm (5 ft 10 in)
- Weight: 84 kg (13 st 3 lb)

Playing information
- Position: Hooker
Club
Years	Team	Pld	T	G	FG	P
2013–15	Sunshine Coast Falcons	53	2	5	0	18
2016	Midlands Hurricanes	21	5	0	0	20
2017	Rochdale Hornets	2	0	0	0	0
2017(loan)	→ Bristol All Golds	2	0	0	0	0
2017(loan)	→ Midlands Hurricanes	1	0	0	0	0
	Total	79	7	5	0	38

Jay Lobwein (born 13 April 1992) is a former Australian rugby league footballer who last played as a hooker for the Rochdale Hornets in the RFL Championship.

== Early life ==
Lobwein was born in Toowoomba, Queensland, Australia. He played junior rugby league for the Southern Suburbs and later attended Ignatius Park College where he was awarded the Player of the Carnival at the annual Confraternity Carnival in 2008.

== Playing career ==
Following stints at the North Queensland Cowboys and Melbourne Storm playing in the NRL Under-20s Lobwein signed with the Sunshine Coast Falcons. He later signed with the Midlands Hurricanes in the UK. Whilst playing rugby league Lobwein completed a Bachelor in Engineering in Civil Engineering at the University of Southern Queensland where he undertook research in geotechnical engineering.

== Post-career ==
Lobwein completed a Master of Science in Soil Mechanics at Imperial College London where he was awarded the Peter Vaughan Memorial Medal.
