= 2013 All Stars match =

Australian rugby league match

Coordinates: 27°27′53″S 153°0′34″E

2013 All Stars Game
Indigenous All Stars	NRL All Stars
32	6
	1	2	3	4	Total
INDIGENOUS	12	6	4	10	32
NRL	6	0	0	0	6
- Date: 9 February 2013
- Stadium: Suncorp Stadium
- Location: Brisbane, Queensland
- Preston Campbell Medal: Ben Barba
- Attendance: 41,201

Broadcast partners
- Broadcasters: Nine Network
- Commentators: Ray Warren; Peter Sterling; Phil Gould

The 2013 All Stars Match was the fourth of the annual representative exhibition matches played between the Indigenous All Stars and the NRL All Stars team which was held on 9 February 2013 in Brisbane, Queensland, Australia.. Once again the players were selected through a voting scheme which over 40,000 fans polled their selections over the two online voting stages. Final stage voting for both sides were closed on the midnight 14 January. After the success of the previous three events the match was moved from Gold Coast's Skilled Park to the larger capacity Suncorp Stadium in Brisbane. The Indigenous All Stars won the match 32–6 to even the ledger with two wins from the four games played so far. Both Ben Barba and Reece Robinson became the first players to score a hat-trick in an All Stars match. The preceding game included a Women's All Stars exhibition match which was won by the NRL Women's All Stars 22–6.

== Teams ==
Benji Marshall (New Zealand captain) and Cameron Smith (Australian captain) were automatic selections for the NRL All Stars side whilst Johnathan Thurston was made captain and an automatic pick for his Indigenous side. After the 16 best voted players for each side were selected by their respective coaches, the coaches were then allowed to personally pick further players to complete their 20-man squads. An asterisk(*) next to a player's name represents debutants for their respective sides.

NRL ALL STARS	Position	INDIGENOUS ALL STARS
Jarryd Hayne	Fullback	Ben Barba
Akuila Uate	Wing	Reece Robinson*
Shaun Kenny-Dowall	Centre	Greg Inglis
Josh Morris	Centre	Justin Hodges
Brett Morris	Wing	Blake Ferguson
Benji Marshall (c)	Five-eighth	Johnathan Thurston (c)
Adam Reynolds*	Halfback	Scott Prince
James Tamou*	Prop	George Rose
Cameron Smith	Hooker	Nathan Peats
Ben Hannant	Prop	Andrew Fifita
Ashley Harrison^{1}	2nd Row	Joel Thompson
Willie Mason*	2nd Row	Greg Bird
Chris Heighington^{5}*	Lock	Timana Tahu*
Robbie Farah	Interchange	Ryan James
Tim Grant*	Interchange	Aidan Sezer*
David Shillington	Interchange	Joel Romelo*
Feleti Mateo	Interchange	Jake Foster*
Justin O'Neill^{2}*	Interchange	Dane Nielsen*
Kieran Foran^{4}*	Interchange	Travis Waddell
Shaun Johnson^{3}*	Interchange	Jack Wighton*
Wayne Bennett	Coach	Laurie Daley

^{1} - Dave Taylor was originally selected to play but withdrew due to injury. He was replaced by Ashley Harrison.
^{2} - Billy Slater was originally selected to play but withdrew due to injury. He was replaced by Jarryd Hayne whilst Justin O'Neill filled Hayne's spot on the bench.
^{3} - Cooper Cronk was originally selected to play but withdrew due to injury. He was replaced by Shaun Johnson.
^{4} - Anthony Watmough was originally selected to play but withdrew due to injury. He was replaced by Kieran Foran.
^{5} - Paul Gallen was originally selected to play but withdrew due to injury. He was replaced by Chris Heighington.

== Result ==
9 February 2013
7:45pm (AEST)

Indigenous All Stars	32 – 6	NRL All Stars
Tries: Ben Barba (10', 20', 31') 3 Reece Robinson (46', 71', 78') 3 Goals: Johnathan Thurston 3/4 (11', 20', 32'); Scott Prince 1/1 (72'); Aidan Sezer 0/1	1st: 12 - 6; 2nd: 6 - 0; 3rd: 4 - 0; 4th: 10 - 0	Tries: Jarryd Hayne (13') 1 Adam Reynolds 1/1 (15')

Suncorp Stadium
Brisbane, Queensland
Attendance: 41,201
Preston Campbell Medal: Ben Barba
Referee: Ashley Klein, Jason Robinson, Chris James, Gavin Morris

== Women's All Stars match ==
2013 Women All Stars match
Indigenous Women All Stars	Women All Stars
6	38
	1	Total
IND	0	6
WAS	0	38
- Date: Saturday 9 February 2013
- Stadium: Suncorp Stadium
- Location: Brisbane
- Woman of the Match: TBA
- Advance Australia Fair: TBA

Broadcast partners

The NRL announced the Women's and Indigenous Women's All Stars teams to take the field as part of the Harvey Norman Rugby League All Stars match on Saturday 9 February in Brisbane. This was the Second Women's rugby league match for the women as part of the fixture, with the level of competition stepping up again the following year, thanks to increased women's pathways nationally and female participation levels across the game at an all-time high.

=== Women's Teams ===
The two teams were selected and announced in November for the match in February.

INDIGENOUS WOMEN ALL STARS	Position	WOMEN ALL STARS
Teresa Anderson	Fullback	Ali Brigginshaw
Kandy Kennedy	Wing	Emma Tonegato
Bianca Ambrum	Centre	Erin Elliott
Ashleigh Monkland	Centre	Jo Barrett
Mahalia Murphy	Wing	Jess Palmer
Theresa Anderson	Five-eighth	Samantha Hammond
Amber Saltner	Halfback	Karyn Murphy
Rebecca Young	Prop	Heather Ballinger
Naomi Bobongie	Hooker	Natalie Dwyer
Caitlin Moss	Prop	Steph Hancock
Emma-Marie Young	2nd Row	Ruan Sims
Ashleigh Singleton	2nd Row	Renae Kunst
Natalie Gala	Lock	Tahnee Norris
Elsja Mosby	Interchange	Suzanne Johnson
Sarah Sailor	Interchange	Alex Sulusi
Eunice Grimes	Interchange	Deanne Turner
Candice Clay	Interchange	Milli Edwards
Lavinia Phillips	Interchange	Talesha Quinn
Rosie Parsons	Interchange
Nakia Davis-Welsh	Interchange
Dennis Moran	Coach	Rob Brough

== Result ==
9 February 2013
7.15pm (AEST)

Indigenous Woman All Stars	6 – 38	Woman All Stars team
Tries: 1 Amber Saltner; Goals: 1 Amber Saltner	Report	Tries: Goals:

Suncorp Stadium
Attendance:
:
Referee: Jarred Maxwell & Ben Cummins
