= Jake Simpkin =

Australian rugby league player

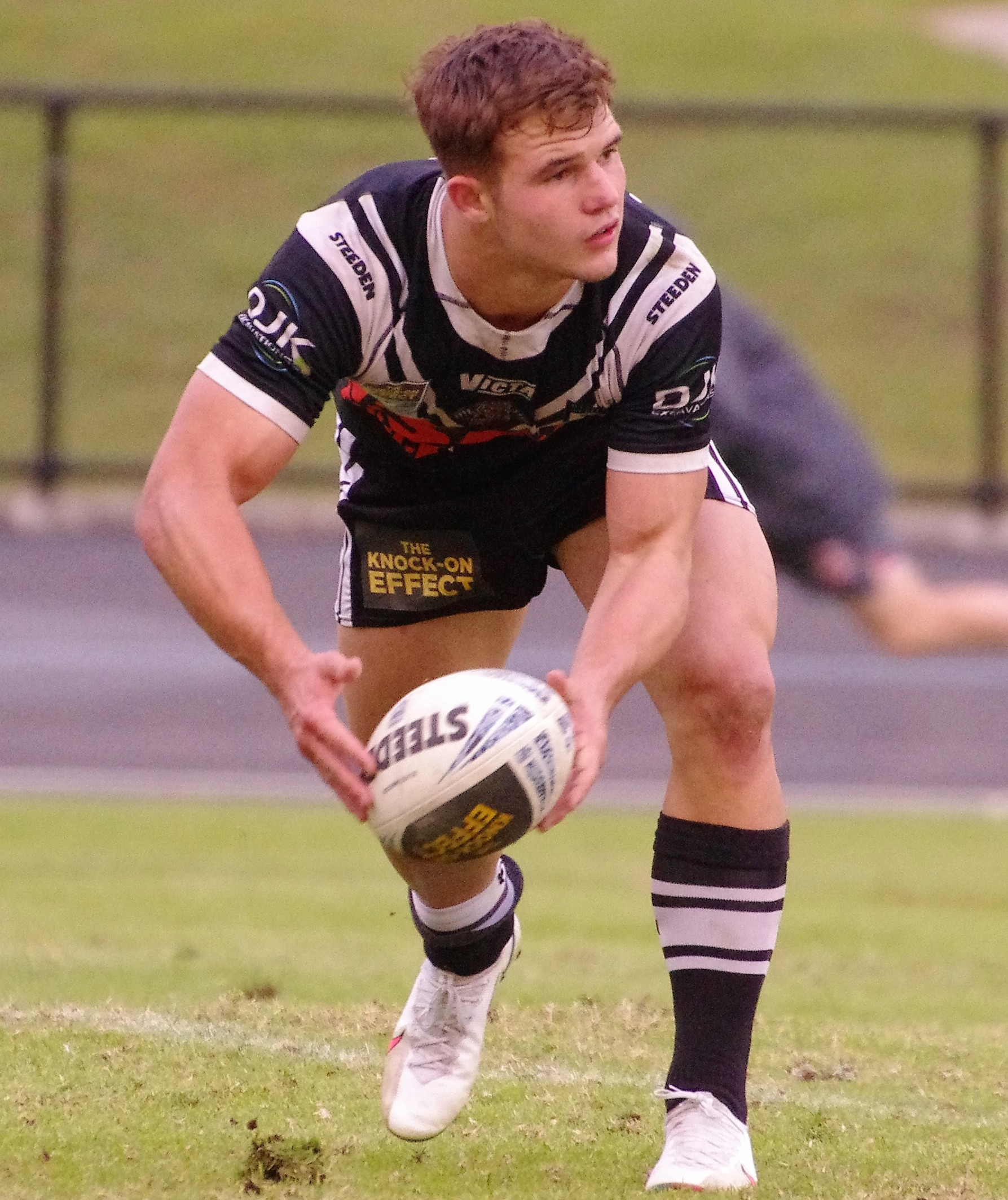

Personal information
- Full name: Jake Simpkin
- Born: 16 October 2001 (age 25) Toowoomba, Queensland, Australia
- Height: 181 cm (5 ft 11 in)
- Weight: 93 kg (14 st 9 lb)

Playing information
- Position: Hooker
Club
Years	Team	Pld	T	G	FG	P
2021–24	Wests Tigers	43	4	0	0	16
2024–	Manly Sea Eagles	52	2	0	0	8
	Total	95	6	0	0	24
Representative
Years	Team	Pld	T	G	FG	P
2022	Prime Minister's XIII	1	0	0	0	0
- Source: As of 5 September 2026

Jake Simpkin (born 16 October 2001) is an Australian professional rugby league footballer who plays as a hooker for the Manly Warringah Sea Eagles in the National Rugby League (NRL).

== Background ==
Simpkin was born in Toowoomba, Queensland and played his junior rugby league for Souths Tigers in the Toowoomba Rugby League. He attended St Mary's College, Toowoomba before being signed by the Brisbane Broncos. In 2018, while playing for St Mary's, he was named Player of the Carnival at the 2018 Confraternity Carnival.

== Playing career ==
=== Early career ===
In 2017, Simpkin represented Queensland under-16 in their 22–16 loss to New South Wales under-16. In 2018, he played for the Western Mustangs in the Mal Meninga Cup. In 2019, Simpkin joined the Wynnum Manly Seagulls playing for their Mal Meninga Cup and Hastings Deering Colts sides. In June 2019, he represented Queensland under-18, scoring a try in their win over New South Wales under-18. On 21 August 2019, Simpkin signed with the Wests Tigers.

=== 2021 ===
Simpkin began the 2021 season playing for Western Suburbs in the New South Wales Cup. In Round 6, he made his NRL debut for the Wests Tigers, starting at hooker in their 18-14 loss to South Sydney.

=== 2022 ===
Simpkin played a total of nine games for the Wests Tigers in the 2022 NRL season as the club claimed the Wooden Spoon for the first time.

=== 2023 ===
Simpkin played a total of 19 games for the Wests Tigers in the 2023 NRL season as the club finished with the wooden spoon for a second straight year.

=== 2024 ===
Simpkin joined the Manly Warringah Sea Eagles mid-season until the end of the 2026 season. Simpkin played six games for Manly in the 2024 NRL season as they finished 7th on the table and qualified for the finals.

=== 2025 ===
Simpkin played 22 matches for Manly in the 2025 NRL season as the club finished 10th on the table. On 26 November, the Sea Eagles announced that Simpkin had re-signed with the club until 2028.

=== 2026 ===
Simpkin played 24 matches for Manly in the 2026 NRL season as the club finished 9th on the table.

== Statistics ==
Year	Team	Games	Tries	Pts
2021	Wests Tigers	9	2	8
2022	Wests Tigers	10		
2023	Wests Tigers	19	2	8
2024	Wests Tigers	5		
2024	Manly Warringah Sea Eagles	6		
2025	Manly Warringah Sea Eagles	22	2	8
2026	Manly Warringah Sea Eagles	14		
	Totals	83	6	24
