= Lillian Yarrow =

Australian rugby league footballer

Personal information
- Full name: Lillian Yarrow
- Born: 11 August 2004 (age 22) Rockhampton, Queensland, Australia
- Height: 183 cm (6 ft 0 in)
- Weight: 85 kg (13 st 5 lb)

Playing information
- Position: Prop, Lock
Club
Years	Team	Pld	T	G	FG	P
2024–25	Nth Qld Cowboys	15	1	0	0	4
2026–	Brisbane Broncos	13	0	0	0	0
	Total	28	1	0	0	4
Representative
Years	Team	Pld	T	G	FG	P
2025–	Prime Minister's XIII	1	0	0	0	0
2026	Queensland	1	0	0	0	0
- Source: As of 16 November 2026

Lillian Yarrow (born 12 August 2004) is an Australian professional rugby league footballer who currently plays for the Brisbane Broncos in the NRL Women's Premiership.

== Background ==
Yarrow was born in Rockhampton where, from the age of six until she turned 12, she played junior rugby league for the Rockhampton Tigers RLFC.

She continued playing the sport while attending Emmaus College where she competed in representative teams such as the schoolgirls team and the Central Crows.

== Playing career ==
=== Early years ===
Yarrow joined the Central Queensland Capras' under-17s competition from the age of 14 where she was selected for the Queensland Country Under-17 Girls team in 2021.

Yarrow was named as the inaugural winner of the Reg Cannon Award at the 2022 Confraternity Carnival for being female player of the carnival.

Yarrow then captained the inaugural Under-18 Queensland Schoolgirls team which served as the curtain-raiser to the series decider of the 2022 Women's State of Origin in Brisbane. Yarrow was then one of ten Queenslanders selected in the first Australian schoolgirls side to compete in Fiji in October 2022.

On 11 March 2023, Yarrow made her QRL Women's Premiership debut for the Central Queensland Capras against the Tweed Heads Seagulls at Browne Park. However, several weeks later during the Round 4 match against the Mackay Cutters, Yarrow ruptured her ACL which led to her having a knee reconstruction. After she recovered, Yarrow re-joined the competition in late 2023, playing for the Mackay Cutters.

=== 2024 ===
Yarrow made her debut for the North Queensland Cowboys when the team played against the Parramatta Eels in Round 3 of the 2024 NRL Women's season on 11 August 2024 at Langlands Park in Brisbane.

=== 2025 ===
On 16 October 2025 it was reported that she had signed for Brisbane Broncos in the NRL Women's Premiership on a 2-year deal.

=== 2026 ===
She made her Queensland debut in Game 3 of the 2026 State of Origin on 28 May 2026 in the 4-12 defeat.
