= Corey Payne =

Australian rugby league footballer and administrator

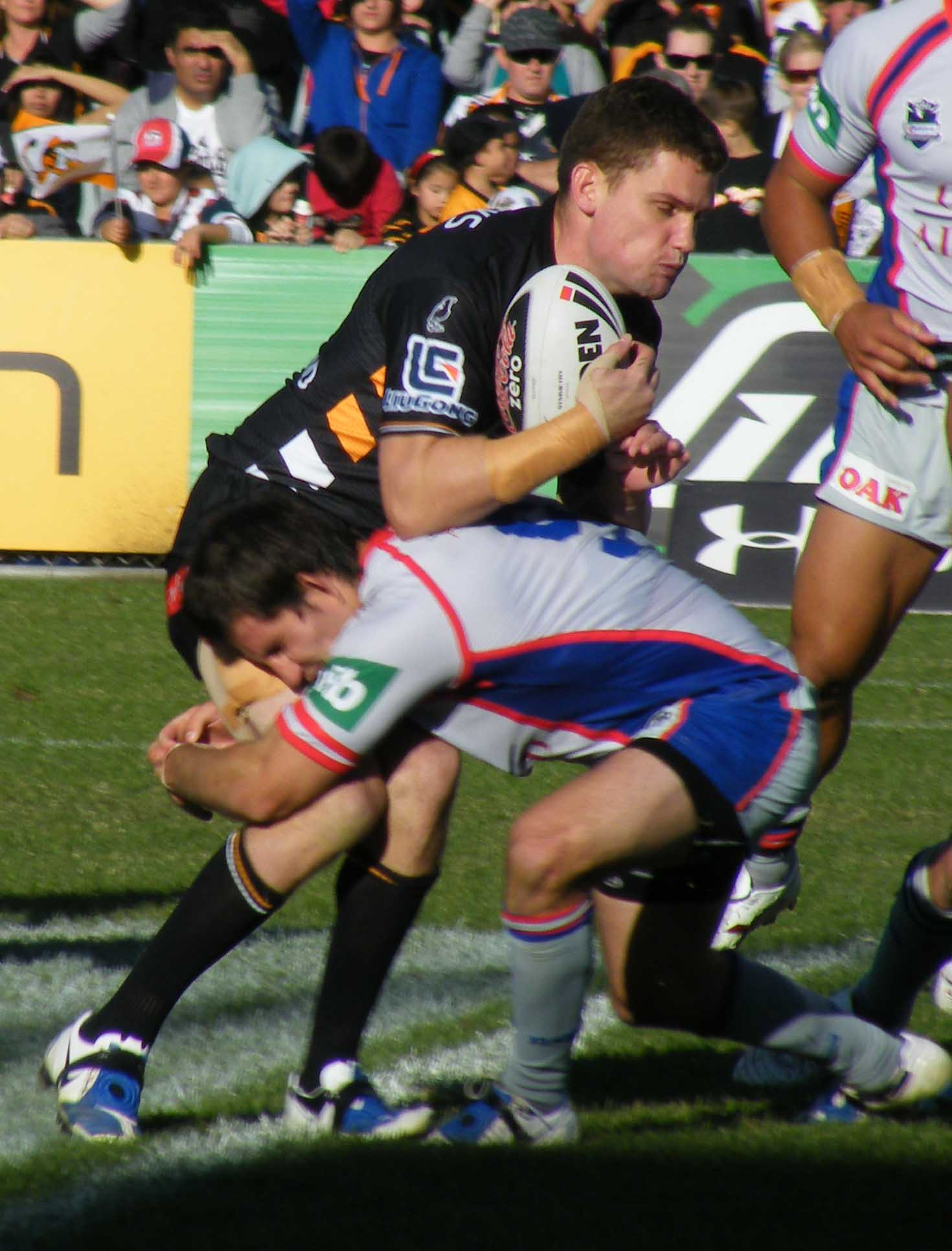

Personal information
- Born: 7 May 1984 (age 42) Sydney, New South Wales, Australia

Playing information
- Height: 186 cm (6 ft 1 in)
- Weight: 101 kg (15 st 13 lb)
- Position: Second-row, Lock
Club
Years	Team	Pld	T	G	FG	P
2005–07	St. George Illawarra	47	8	0	0	32
2008–09	Wests Tigers	41	2	0	0	8
2010–12	Canterbury Bulldogs	43	0	0	0	0
	Total	131	10	0	0	40
Representative
Years	Team	Pld	T	G	FG	P
2012	NSW City	1	0	0	0	0

Corey Payne (born 7 May 1984 in Sydney, New South Wales) is an Australian former professional rugby league footballer in the National Rugby League (NRL) competition. Payne played for the Canterbury-Bankstown Bulldogs, the St George Illawarra Dragons and the Wests Tigers. He also represented NSW City. Payne primarily played at lock.

== Playing career ==
He played his junior football with the Chester Hill Hornets.

Payne made his NRL debut in round 1 of the 2005 NRL season, scoring a try against Canterbury-Bankstown. He played in the club's preliminary final defeat against the Wests Tigers during the same season.

Late in 2009, it was announced that Payne had signed for the 2010 NRL season with Canterbury, where he had played in lower grades.

However, an injury to his shoulder in the pre-season threatened to sideline him for the rest of the year. He made his debut for Canterbury-Bankstown in the last round of the 2010 NRL season.

Payne was nominated for the Ken Stephen Medal for his contributions to rugby league off the field, and is well known for community and charity work. He graduated from the University of Sydney with a bachelor's degree in commerce.

In the 2012 NRL season, Payne made 27 appearances for Canterbury as the club won the Minor Premiership and reached the 2012 NRL Grand Final. Payne played from the bench as Canterbury lost the decider 14–4 at ANZ Stadium. Payne retired from rugby league at the age of 28.

== Post playing ==
On 14 April 2016 Payne was announced as the new Penrith Panthers CEO. He resigned from the position on 16 August 2016.
