= St Mary's College, Toowoomba =

Location
- Toowoomba, Queensland; Australia; 27°33′38″S 151°56′31″E

Information
- Type: Independent primary and secondary school
- Motto: Latin: Conanti Corona (The one who strives will win the crown)
- Religious affiliation: Diocese of Toowoomba
- Denomination: Congregation of Christian Brothers
- Established: 1899; 127 years ago
- Founder: Congregation of Christian Brothers
- Trust: Edmund Rice Education Australia
- Headmaster: Brendan Stewart
- Chaplain: Fr Ray Crowley
- Years offered: 5–12
- Gender: Boys
- Enrolment: 930 (2025)
- Campus: Regional
- Colours: Blue and white
- Website: www.stmaryscollege.com

St Mary's College, Toowoomba is an private Catholic senior primary and secondary school for boys, located in Newtown, Toowoomba, Queensland, Australia. The college was established by the Congregation of Christian Brothers in 1899 and is a member of Edmund Rice Education Australia. In 2025, the school had an enrolment of 930 students from Years 5 to 12.

== Subjects ==
St Mary's College offers a wide range of subjects, including arts, drama, English, foreign languages (Japanese and Spanish), graphics, humanities, I.T.E, maths, music, P.E, religion, science, and wood tech and metal tech.

English is the most spoken language, although Dinka, German, Portuguese and Indonesian are spoken by more than 100 students. English, Japanese and Spanish are taught at the school.

== Notable alumni ==
- Sir Walter Campbell QC, DSO, MC, OBE – a former Governor of Queensland, jurist and barrister
- Virgil Patrick Copas MSC – appointed Archbishop of Port Moresby in 1966
- Joseph Anthony (Tony) Dietz – air vice-marshall; senior engineer officer in the Royal Australian Air Force
- Ian “Ripper” Doyle – rugby league player; played for the Kangaroos
- Frank Forde PC – politician; the 15th Prime Minister of Australia, serving only eight days in office in 1945
- Peter Gill – rugby league player
- Tom Gorman – rugby league player; captained the Kangaroos in 1929–30
- Harold Hawkins GLM, ICD, CBE, AFC – air vice-marshal; appointed air advisor to Rhodesian High Commissioner and Chief of Air Staff – 1955
- Graham Healy – local radio announcer and politician; Member for Toowoomba North 1992–2001
- Michael Katsidis – boxer
- Stathi Katsidis – jockey; multiple Brisbane premiership-winner
- Vince Lester OAM – former politician; served for 30 years (1974–2004); former National Party minister
- Ben Lowe – rugby league player
- Jaiman Lowe – rugby league player
- Ethan Lowe
- Catherine McGregor AM – prominent transgender writer, activist, and former Australian Defence Force officer
- Neil ‘Digger’ McGrowdie – jockey; won 1957 Melbourne Cup on ‘Straight Draw’
- Cory Paix – rugby league player
- Jake Simpkin – rugby league player
- Johnathan Thurston – rugby league player; dual Dally M Medal winner (2005 & 2007); represented Queensland and the Kangaroos
- Ben Walker – rugby league player
- Chris Walker – rugby league player
- Shane Walker – rugby league player
