= St Mary's Catholic College, Casino =

Coordinates: 28.8618°S 153.0450°E

St. Mary's Catholic College Casino

Location
- Canterbury Street; Casino, New South Wales; Australia

Information
- Type: Private, coeducational
- Motto: Reach Out
- Denomination: Roman Catholic
- Established: 1946
- Principal: Michael Campbell
- Grades: 7 – 12
- Gender: Co-educational
- Enrolment: 440 (approx)
- Website: cashlism.catholic.edu.au

St. Mary's Catholic College Casino is a co-educational Catholic secondary school in Casino, New South Wales, Australia. It was founded by the Marist Brothers in 1946.

In 2016, St. Mary's team took first place in the Australian Youth Rocketry Challenge. In 2017, the school was allotted a place on the Australian and New Zealand Army Corps memorial tour.

== Houses ==
There are four houses at St Mary's Catholic College:

Name	Colour	Name origin
Champagnat	Blue	Marcellin Champagnat
De Paul	Green	St Vincent de Paul
McAuley	Red	Catherine McAuley
MacKillop	Yellow	Mary MacKillop
