= Jamie Simpson =

Australian rugby league coach and former player

Personal information
- Full name: Jamie Lee Simpson
- Born: 6 September 1986 (age 40) Rockhampton, Queensland, Australia

Playing information
- Height: 181 cm (5 ft 11 in)
- Weight: 93 kg (14 st 9 lb)
- Position: Wing, Centre
Club
Years	Team	Pld	T	G	FG	P
2008–10	South Sydney	37	16	0	0	64
2011	Huddersfield Giants	9	0	0	0	0
	Total	46	16	0	0	64
Representative
Years	Team	Pld	T	G	FG	P
2010	NSW Residents	1	1	0	0	4

Jamie Simpson (born 6 September 1986) is an Australian rugby league coach and former player. He is a coach with the Central Queensland Capras, a feeder club for the NRL club the Brisbane Broncos in the Queensland Cup and a former rugby league footballer who played in the 2000s and 2010s. Simpson played as a wing and as a centre. Simpson also played as a lock and five-eighth in his schoolboy years at St. Brendan's College, Yeppoon. Simpson is an ambassador for The Men of League Foundation and Lymphoma Australia.

== Background ==
Simpson was born in Rockhampton, Queensland, Australia.

== Early life and cancer survival ==
Simpson was convinced by his mother to join the Fitzroy Junior Rugby League club while a young student at the Rockhampton primary school 'The Hall'. He decided to attend St. Brendan's College in Yeppoon for its rugby league program. It was there that Simpson developed greater self-discipline, with coach Terry Hansen observing "I knew he'd turned the corner" after an on-field incident in 2001 where Simpson refused to respond to an opposing player's punches after the ball was played.

In late 2001, he was selected in the school's 1st XIII at age 15. In June 2002, Simpson represented St Brendan's College at Confraternity Carnival for the 2nd XIII. In August the same year, he was part of the only 2nd XIII to win the local Open Schoolboys competition against Nth Rocky High School after the 1st XIII withdrew to compete in the arrive alive competition. This historic win came after an overtime game which saw him play a high-impact game.

However, in August 2002 he was diagnosed with cancer. Simpson played what could potentially have been his last game, a pre-season match against Kirwan State High School, prior to his team being informed of the diagnosis.

From 2002 to 2003, Simpson was undergoing chemotherapy for life-threatening Hodgkin's lymphoma. Despite this, he continued to be involved in rugby league by volunteering as an assistant coach for a school's 2nd XIII team.

Coach Mannie Navarro and his wife Ek were so moved with Simpson's courageous, selfless optimism that they later named their third son James Neal Navarro 11.11.2008 after Jamie. While hospitalised in isolation in late 2003, Brisbane Broncos coach Wayne Bennett gave him an autographed copy of his book Don't Die with the Music in You with a personal message: "Tough time comes and goes, but tough guys last forever" and was also encouraged to pursue a professional career by family friend Scott Minto.

Simpson was South Sydney's nominee for the 2009 Ken Stephen Medal for Services to the Community for his work in helping and visiting young people with cancer.

== Early career ==
Simpson started his senior career for Broncos feeder clubs Aspley and the Toowoomba Clydesdales in 2005–2006. Simpson was a frequent try-scorer in the QLD Cup for Aspley, and gained representative honours for the Queensland City origin side in 2007, he was overlooked for selection in first-grade for the Broncos in favor of older players.

== First-Grade career ==
Simpson was then lured to the South Sydney Rabbitohs for the 2008 NRL season. Injury delayed his first grade début in until round 13, where he scored a try against the New Zealand Warriors. Once given the opportunity in the NRL, Simpson's début season was a major success. Commentators believe that Simpson's performance was a major component of a mid season resurgence for the Rabbitohs, even relegating former international Nigel Vagana from inclusion in the side.

Simpson's 2009 season included an accidental collision with a referee in round 19, and a hat trick of tries in round 20.

On 14 January 2011 it had been announced that Simpson had signed for Huddersfield Giants on a 3-year deal. However, he only played nine times for them and was unavailable to play for four months following shoulder surgery in April. The Giants released him from contract on 16 December 2011 and he was expected to return to the NRL in Australia.

In January 2012 he signed with the Queensland Cup team Eastern Suburbs Tigers, based in Brisbane, who are a feeder club for the NRL team the Brisbane Broncos.

In June 2013, he signed with Central Queensland Capra's team based in Rockhampton, who are feeder club to the Brisbane Broncos and compete in the Intrust Super Cup. His signing was a major coup for the Central Queensland team who are also part of the CQ NRL bid pushing for another team in Queensland. Simpson was hoping to re kindle some early career form and help raise the profile of CQ Capra's.

== Coaching career ==
In 2015/2016, Simpson was announced as the Under 18 Mal Meninga Cup coach for the CQ Capras. Simpson had a successful season leading the minnows to the quarter-finals. Jamie has also mentored and helped his players receive NRL and Queensland cup contracts. Sam Murphy has been contracted to the North Queensland Cowboys, Kobe Hetherington to one of Simpsons old clubs the Brisbane Broncos, Eli Noovao to Melbourne Storms Feeder club East Tigers, Chalice Atoi to the Central Queensland Capras and lastly Zac Hetherington and Josh Wilkinson have been contracted to the Canterbury Bulldogs. He also spent 2015 as the A-grade coach for local Rockhampton Rugby League side, the Fitzroy Gracemere Sharks of which he was a JR Fitzroy Sharks player growing up as a child in Rockhampton.

== Radio career ==
In 2012, Simpson joined Southern Cross Austereo in Rockhampton as a promotions staff member for Hot FM and Sea FM. Soon after he began work at Southern Cross Austereo, he became a relief announcer for both stations. With his quick wit and laid back attitude, Simpson has gained plaudits for his work in the industry and he formed a great relationship with Hot FM breakfast announcers, Browny (Paul Brown) & EJ (Emilie-Jain Palmer). Simpson became known for conducting live crosses to Browny & EJ's breakfast show while driving the station's "Hot Thunder" promotions vehicle to various locations to hand out free promotional merchandise to listeners. Although Browny and EJ have since moved on to other stations, Simpson has stayed close friends with the two presenters.

In 2018, Simpson was added to the Triple M radio show "The B Team" a sportcentric panel show that focus's on sports in particular local Central Queensland sporting teams and athletes from all ages.

In May 2018, Simpson debuted his new segment on the B Team "60 seconds with Simo". Though it has only aired once at the time of writing and looks to become a regular on the weekend sports show.
