= Ben Barba =

Australian former rugby league footballer

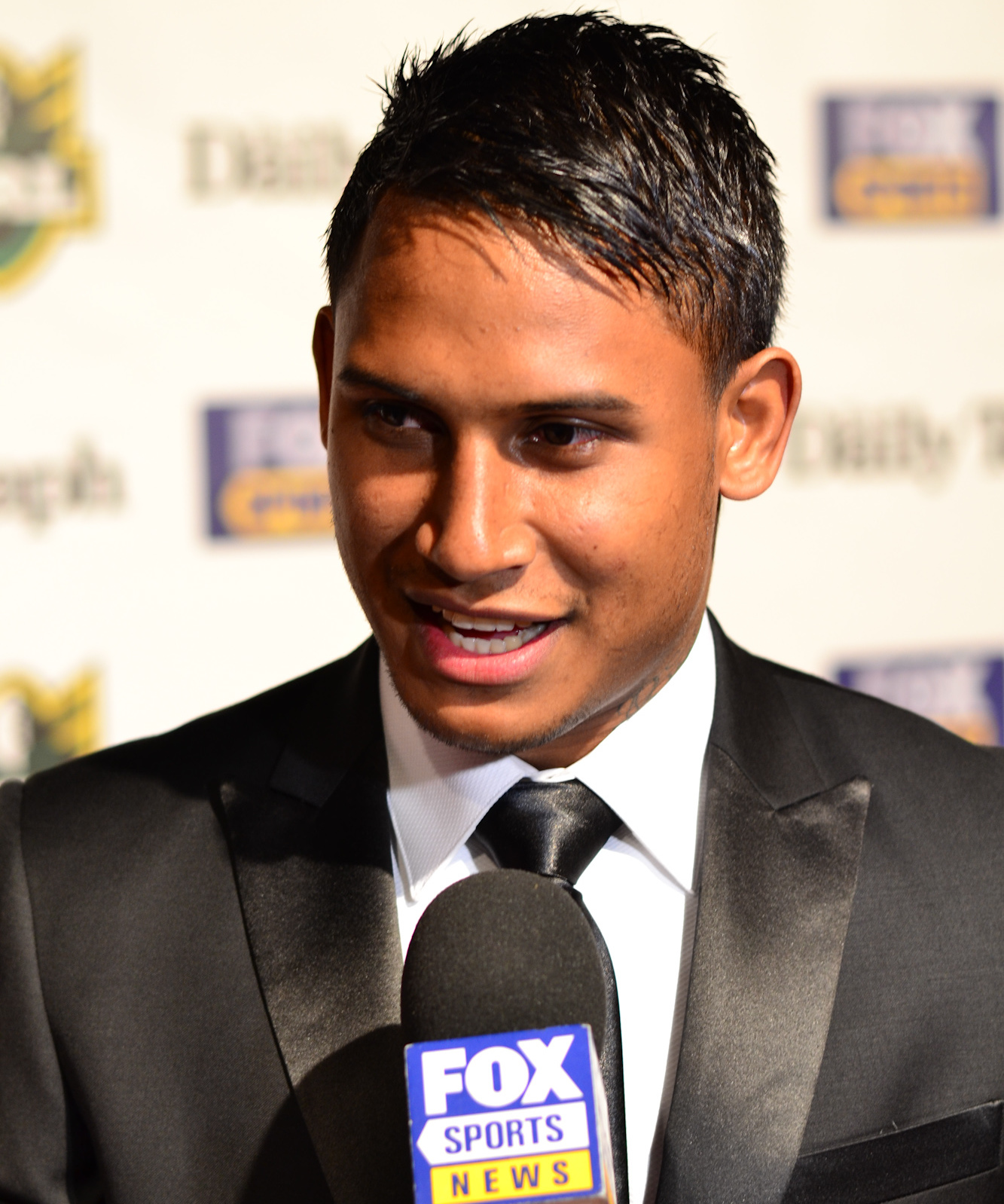

Personal information
- Full name: Benjamin Barba
- Born: 13 June 1989 (age 37) Darwin, Northern Territory, Australia
- Height: 176 cm (5 ft 9 in)
- Weight: 91 kg (14 st 5 lb)

Playing information

Rugby league
- Position: Fullback, Five-eighth
Club
Years	Team	Pld	T	G	FG	P
2008–13	Canterbury Bulldogs	97	72	0	0	288
2014	Brisbane Broncos	25	8	0	0	32
2015–16	Cronulla Sharks	46	19	0	0	76
2017–18	St Helens	34	34	0	0	136
	Total	202	133	0	0	532
Representative
Years	Team	Pld	T	G	FG	P
2011–16	Indigenous All Stars	6	4	0	0	16
2011	Prime Minister's XIII	1	0	0	0	0

Rugby union
- Position: Centre, Wing, Fullback
Club
Years	Team	Pld	T	G	FG	P
2017	Toulon	4	0	0	0	0
- Source: As of 24 January 2022

Benjamin Barba (born 13 June 1989) is an Australian former professional dual code rugby league and rugby union footballer who last played for St Helens in the Super League. He primarily played as a fullback or five-eighth.

Barba won the Dally M Medal award for Player of the Year in 2012 while he was at the Canterbury-Bankstown Bulldogs.

Barba also played for the Canterbury-Bankstown Bulldogs, the Brisbane Broncos in 2014 and the Cronulla-Sutherland Sharks where he was part of Cronulla's maiden NRL premiership win in the 2016 NRL Grand Final. In 2018, he won the Man of Steel Award for Super League Player of the Year while playing for St Helens. Barba is only the second man to win both the Dally M Medal and the Man of Steel award, after Gavin Miller.

Barba also had a brief stint in rugby union with RC Toulonnais.

== Early years ==
Barba was born in Darwin, Northern Territory, Australia. He is of Aboriginal, Afghan, and Torres Strait Islander descent. At a young age, Barba and his family moved from Darwin in the Northern Territory to Mackay in Queensland. During his time in Queensland he played all of his junior rugby league for the North Devils, Mackay and attended Mackay State High School and St Patrick's College, Mackay. He also played Australian Rules at both primary and secondary school competition level in Mackay as a goal kicking forward, though with limited opportunities to participate in the sport, he followed Hawks in the Australian Football League.

== Rugby league career ==
Barba signed with the Bulldogs in 2007 at the age of 18 and joined the club in the middle of the 2007 season. In his first season at Belmore, Barba played in the Jersey Flegg competition, where he scored 130 points in 11 games. Barba played 26 games, scored 38 tries, kicked 93 goals and two fields goals for 340 points in his U20s career from 2008 to 2009.

=== 2008 ===
In his second season with the Canterbury side, on 9 January 2008, Barba signed a contract extension keeping him at the club till the end of the 2010 season. Barba played most of the season in the Toyota Cup Under 20s competition, scoring 26 tries in 27 games. Canterbury coach Steve Folkes stated that he was still too young and it would be a couple of years till he would become a first grader. As the season went on, Canterbury kept on losing games and were possibly going to win the wooden spoon resulting in the fans urging that Barba be put into first grade.

Barba made his NRL debut for Canterbury in Round 20, against the St. George Illawarra Dragons in the same week that Sonny Bill Williams quit the club. They were heavily beaten by St. George Illawarra 30-0 at ANZ Stadium. At the time he was called up to first-grade, Barba was working at a car wash. Barba played three more games, but all were losses. A 36-12 loss in Round 22 to the other desperate team close to winning the wooden spoon, the North Queensland Cowboys, at Suncorp Stadium, saw Barba scoring his first ever first grade try. In the 2008 NRL season, Barba played four games and scored a try and was named in the 2008 Toyota Cup (Under-20s) Team of the Year.

=== 2009 ===
Barba started the season in first grade under new coach Kevin Moore. He played off the interchange bench in Round 1 against the Manly-Warringah Sea Eagles On 28 March, the night after Canterbury's Round 3 loss against the Gold Coast Titans where he had his first start at five-eighth, Barba got into a drunken fight with Canterbury teammates Jamal Idris and Lee Te Maari at the Wentworthville pub carpark. Idris punched Barba after he shoved Te Maari against a wall. After the incident Barba was dropped into NSW Cup and played for the Bankstown City Bulls until Round 18 against the New Zealand Warriors at Mt Smart Stadium. The match was a memorable one for Barba and for the club. Canterbury were down 14-12 with a couple of minutes to go, then the Bulldogs made a break and Barba received a pass from Ben Roberts before stepping and diving over for the winning try in Canterbury's 18-14 win. Barba eventually played the rest of the season in reserve grade. He played in Canterbury's NSW Cup Grand Final Premiership 32-0 win over the Balmain Ryde Eastwood Tigers where he scored a hat trick of tries. Barba finished the season with one try from 4 games.

=== 2010 ===
Barba started the season as a regular first grade player. In Round 3 against the Sydney Roosters, Barba came off the interchange bench and scored a hat trick of tries in the Canterbury club's 60-14 massacre win at ANZ Stadium, earning "The X-Factor" tag after his exciting performance in the match. In Round 5, Barba scored a sensational try when halftime was approaching in the Bulldogs heartbreaking try on full-time 30-24 loss to the New Zealand Warriors. In Round 11, Barba started for the first time in the season at halfback in Canterbury's 31-16 loss against the Penrith Panthers. Barba finished Canterbury's low performing season with him playing in 21 matches and scoring 15 tries, being Canterbury's standout player.

=== 2011 ===
At the beginning of the season, on 12 February, Barba made his representative debut for the Indigenous All Stars in the 2011 All Stars Match. He scored his first ever representative try in the match where they lost to the NRL All Stars 28-12 at Cbus Super Stadium. With the departure of former Canterbury and NSW Country fullback Luke Patten to English club the Salford City Reds, Barba became Canterbury's new full-time fullback. In Round 6, Barba scored a hat-trick of tries in Canterbury's 34-14 win over the Parramatta Eels at ANZ Stadium. The second try came with 49 seconds of the first half remaining, from a move starting in his team's own half and finishing with Barba taking a pass from Jamal Idris, jumping up and twisting the ball round to touch down just inside the in-goal area, as two Parramatta defenders tried to force him out into touch. His shoulder touching the corner post in the process, with the corner post no longer being part of the touch in-goal area.

It was announced on 20 July that Barba had signed a contract extension at the Canterbury club until the end of the 2015 season. In Round 25, Barba scored two tries in the 32-22 win against the Newcastle Knights in a thrilling second half comeback after they were trailing 22-6 at halftime. Barba scored a try when he chased down a Jonathan Wright cross over kick which was going to go over the dead ball line before Baraba reached out his arms and placed the ball down millimetres away from the deal ball line. In Round 26, with Canterbury just missing out of a top eight spot, Barba scored four tries in the 36-22 win against the Canberra Raiders at ANZ Stadium in retiring Canterbury captain and second rower Andrew Ryan last ever game. Barba finished the year with him playing in 24 matches and scoring 23 tries, being the season's equal top try scorer with South Sydney Rabbitohs winger Nathan Merritt. Barba played on the interchange bench in the Prime Minister's XIII squad to play against Papua New Guinea at the end of the year.

=== 2012 ===
Barba began the year by playing for the NRL Indigenous All Stars team in the 2012 All Stars match where the Indigenous Team lost 36-28. Barba earned himself a selection into the 25-man Queensland State of Origin squad, named as their 19th man in the lead up to Game II of the 2012 series, but did not play in any games. In Round 16 against the Melbourne Storm at Virgin Australia Stadium in Mackay, in front his own hometown crowd, Barba set the 2012 try of the year for teammate Josh Morris. Barba fielded a Storm kick only one metre from the dead ball line, then evaded his opposition beating six defenders and ran 70 metres down field before centre kicking for Morris to score next to the posts for what was a 109-metre try. On 4 September, Barba was awarded the 2012 Dally M Medal. In addition he won the 'Peter Frilingos Headline Moment of the Year', the Provan-Summons Medal as 'People's Choice' Player of the Year as well as being named Fullback of the Year. After the Canterbury side won their first two final matches they made into the 2012 NRL Grand Final against the Melbourne Storm on 30 September. Barba played at fullback and had a try disallowed in Canterbury's 14-4 loss. Barba finished season as the Canterbury club's and the NRL's top try scorer with 22 tries in 27 matches.

=== 2013 ===
On 9 February 2013, Barba played for the NRL Indigenous All Stars team in the 2013 All Stars match where he scored a first half hat trick of tries and was awarded the Preston Campbell Medal as the man of the match in the Indigenous Team 32-6 win over the NRL All Stars at Suncorp Stadium. On 25 February 2013, Barba was stood down indefinitely from player duties at the Canterbury club due to behavioural issues and for breaches of the club's code of conduct as a result of his off-field behaviour. Barba had numerous personal issues to resolve before being allowed to play again for Canterbury. Barba returned to action for Canterbury in Round 4 and scored his first try of the season in their 17-12 loss to the South Sydney Rabbitohs at ANZ Stadium. In Round 20, Barba suffered first ever first grade NRL injury causing him to require time and therapy off the field during Canterbury's 40-12 win against the Parramatta Eels at ANZ Stadium. Barba suffered the ankle injury scoring a try. On 28 August, while still on injury, Barba asked for a release from the Bulldogs due to his ambition to play for the Brisbane Broncos since he and his family are from Queensland. Barba transferred for a three-year deal starting in February 2014. This led to an ankle adjustment surgery in early December ready for the new season in early March 2014 with the Brisbane Broncos. Barba returned for the Canterbury side in the last regular game of the season in Round 26 against the club he signed with the Brisbane Broncos, playing off the interchange bench in Canterbury's 16-11 loss at Suncorp Stadium. Barba played last game for Canterbury-Bankstown in the Finals Week 1 match against the Newcastle Knights where in the 50th minute, Barba was stretchered off from the field due to his ankle problem in their season ending 22-6 loss at ANZ Stadium. Barba finished his last year with the Canterbury-Bankstown Bulldogs in the 2013 NRL season with him playing in 17 matches and scoring 10 tries.

=== 2014 ===
On 14 February 2014, Barba was selected in the Broncos inaugural 2014 NRL Auckland Nines squad, putting on his Brisbane jersey for the first time. In Round 1 of the 2014 season, Barba made his club debut for the Broncos against his former club the Canterbury-Bankstown Bulldogs with him assisting in a try for Dale Copley in Brisbane's 18-12 win at ANZ Stadium. After the match Barba was subjected to racism on Instagram from an 18-year-old Canterbury fan and park footballer from Dapto. In Round 3 against the Sydney Roosters, Barba played his 100th NRL career match in the Broncos last minute 30-26 loss at Suncorp Stadium. In Round 7 against the Newcastle Knights, Barba scored his first try in Brisbane colours in their 32-6 win at Hunter Stadium. In Round 19 against the New Zealand Warriors at Suncorp Stadium, Barba made a switch from fullback to five-eighth with some success assisting the Brisbane side to a 28-22 win. Barba's five-eighth switch continued for the rest of the year. In Round 24 against the Newcastle Knights at Suncorp Stadium, Barba scored a hat-trick of tries in the Brisbane sides 48-6 win. Barba finished the 2014 NRL season with him playing in all the Brisbane Broncos 25 matches and scoring eight tries in his only year in Brisbane. On 8 November 2014, Barba was told by Broncos incoming coach Wayne Bennett that his services weren't needed for the 2015 season and was granted permission to search for another club to sign with, the Cronulla-Sutherland Sharks being the favourites to sign the unwanted fullback and five-eighth. On 11 November, Barba signed a three-year contract with the Cronulla-Sutherland Sharks starting in 2015.

=== 2015 ===
On 13 February, Barba played at five-eighth for the Indigenous All Stars in the 2015 All Stars match at Cbus Super Stadium. The Indigenous side won 20-6 over the NRL All Stars. In Round 1 of the 2015 NRL season, he made his club debut for the Cronulla side against the Canberra Raiders, playing at five-eighth in the Sharks' 24-20 loss at Remondis Stadium. In Round 6 against the Newcastle Knights, he scored his first try for Cronulla in their 22-6 win at Remondis Stadium. In Round 18 against the St. George Illawarra Dragons, he made headlines after pulling off a try-saving tackle on St. George forward Ben Creagh as Creagh was racing to score next to the goal posts, while Barba also scored a try in the Cronulla club's 28-8 win at Remondis Stadium. Barba finished off his first year with the Cronulla club having played in 19 matches and scoring three tries. On 15 December 2015, Barba was named at five-eighth for the Indigenous All Stars team to play against the NRL All Stars on 13 February 2016.

=== 2016 ===
On 29 January, Barba was named in the Sharks 2016 Auckland Nines squad. On 13 February 2016, Barba played for the Indigenous All Stars against the World All Stars, playing at five-eighth in the 12-8 loss at Suncorp Stadium. Barba would go on to have a standout season and play an integral part in Cronulla's first premiership. In November 2016, Barba tested positive to having cocaine in his system and was suspended indefinitely by the NRL. Cronulla-Sutherland granted him an immediate release from his contract to deal with these issues.

=== 2017 ===
On 1 February 2017, it was announced that Barba had switched codes and joined French Top 14 rugby union team RC Toulonnais for 2 1/2 seasons. On 10 May 2017, he was sacked by Toulon after playing just four games in French rugby. On 24 May 2017, Barba signed a 2 1/2 year contract with English Super League club St. Helens.

=== 2018 ===
Barba enjoyed a successful season with St Helens in 2018, scoring 28 tries in 23 games as the club finished the regular season with the League Leaders' Shield.

On 25 September 2018, Barba signed a one-year deal with the North Queensland Cowboys for the 2019 season.

On 2 October 2018, he was named at fullback in the 2018 Super League Dream Team. On 8 October 2018, Barba won the Man of Steel award. He became the second player after Gavin Miller to win both the Man of Steel and Dally M Medal.

=== 2019 ===
On 1 February 2019, before playing a game for the North Queensland Cowboys, Barba was released due to a significant breach of the terms of his contract. It was later reported that Barba was being investigated by Townsville police regarding the alleged assault of his partner on Australia Day. If proven true, NRL CEO Todd Greenberg confirmed that he would not return to the NRL, with the RFL confirming they would mirror any NRL ban.

On 5 February 2019, the NRL banned Barba indefinitely. It was subsequently reported that he was working as a truck driver, but was employed as a metalworker in Mackay, Queensland, earning $20 an hour.

== NRL statistics ==
Statistics are correct to the end of the 2018 season

=== NRL ===
†	Denotes seasons in which Barba won an NRL Premiership

Season	Team	Matches	T	G	GK %	F/G	Pts
2008	Canterbury-Bankstown	4	1	0	—	0	4
2009	Canterbury-Bankstown	4	1	0	—	0	4
2010	Canterbury-Bankstown	21	15	0	—	0	60
2011	Canterbury-Bankstown	24	23	0	—	0	92
2012	Canterbury-Bankstown	27	22	0	—	0	88
2013	Canterbury-Bankstown	17	10	0	—	0	40
2014	Brisbane	25	8	0	—	0	32
2015	Cronulla-Sutherland	19	3	0	—	0	12
2016†	Cronulla-Sutherland	27	16	0	—	0	64
Career totals		168	99	0	—	0	396

=== Super League ===
Season	Team	Matches	T	G	GK %	F/G	Pts
2017	St Helens	5	3	0	—	0	12
2018	St Helens	29	31	0	—	0	124
Career totals		34	34	0	—	0	136

== Other sports ==
In April 2019, Barba signed for Mackay Rangers soccer club in the Mackay Regional Football premier league and made several appearances for the club but was largely unsuccessful in his attempted code switch.

In July 2020, he made another shock code switch to Australian rules football and played for the Eastern Swans reserves in the AFL Mackay competition where he lined up in the position of full forward and kicked seven goals on debut. He impressed enough to warrant a call up to the seniors team several hours later and kicked a further six goals. Barba finished second in the league goalkicking in 2020, 2021 and 2022 with 26, 63 and 68 goals respectively. He also represented North Queensland in 2021 against South Queensland in an AFL curtain raiser match.

== Personal life ==
Barba has four daughters with his girlfriend Ainslie Currie.

Barba's older brother, Aaron, played rugby league in the Queensland Cup, setting the competition record for most tries in a season with 33 in 2003. His younger brother, Marmin, held an NRL contract with the Gold Coast Titans in 2013 and won a Queensland Cup premiership and NRL State Championship with the Ipswich Jets.

== Domestic violence allegations ==
In 2013, the NRL investigated Barba after his on and off girlfriend, Currie, claimed he punched her in the face, and sent pictures to a friend showing her bloodied chin.

On Australia Day 2019, he was seen on CCTV assaulting Currie at a Townsville casino. The assault lasted for more than half an hour. His partner chose not to press charges.

In March 2019, Barba pleaded guilty to public nuisance, and sentenced to community service, with magistrate John Smith noting that his ban from the NRL had been an "enormous penalty".
