= Aquinas College, Southport =

Location
- Southport, Gold Coast, Queensland; Australia; 27°58′33″S 153°22′58″E

Information
- Type: Independent secondary school
- Motto: Latin: Pro Deo (English: For God)
- Religious affiliation: Roman Catholic
- Denomination: Congregation of Christian Brothers (former)
- Established: 1964; 62 years ago
- Founder: Archbishop James Duhig
- Oversight: Brisbane Catholic Education, Archdiocese of Brisbane
- Headmaster: Marcus Richardson
- Staff: c. 100
- Years offered: 7–12
- Gender: Co-educational
- Enrolment: 1,200
- Colours: Red and blue
- Website: www.aquinas.qld.edu.au

Aquinas College is an independent Catholic secondary school, located in the Gold Coast suburb of Southport in Queensland, Australia.

Aquinas College has a current enrolment of 1,200 students from Year 7 to 12. Founded in 1964 by the Congregation of Christian Brothers, the college is owned by the parish and is administered and staffed by Brisbane Catholic Education. Aquinas College has four houses, Chisholm, Edmund Rice, McAuley and Romero.

== Notable alumni ==
- Jesinta Campbell, TV personality/model
- Meaghan Scanlon, lawyer, politician, Member for Gaven
- Samuel Van Grinsven, Film Director and Screenwriter

== See also ==
- catholic education in Australia
- Lists of schools in Queensland
