= St Patrick's College, Mackay =

St Patrick's College

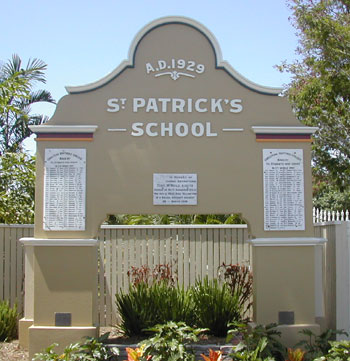
- Honour board at St Patrick's College of past students who served in WWII

Location
- Mackay, Queensland; Australia; 21°08′22″S 149°11′04″E

Information
- Former name: St Patrick's Christian Brothers College
- Type: Systemic senior secondary school
- Motto: Seek Christ
- Religious affiliation: Catholicism
- Denomination: Congregation of Christian Brothers (1929–1987)
- Established: 1929; 97 years ago (as St Patrick's Christian Brothers College)
- Founder: Congregation of Christian Brothers
- Oversight: Catholic Education Office, Diocese of Rockhampton (since 1987)
- Principal: Janelle Agius
- Grades: 7–12
- Gender: Co-educational
- Enrolment: 480 (2012)
- Campus type: Regional
- Colours: Blue, white, red and gold
- Website: www.stpats.qld.edu.au

St Patrick's College is a coeducational Catholic systemic secondary school, located in Mackay, Queensland, Australia. The college's motto is "Seek and Serve Christ". The current principal is Janelle Agius.

== History ==
St Patrick's College was founded in 1929 as St Patrick's Christian Brothers College, an all-boys school run by the Congregation of Christian Brothers. The school was situated on the Gregory Street site which is the main site of the current senior campus. From the 1870s, the River Street site of today's St Patrick's College was occupied by St Joseph's Convent School (later St Patrick's Convent School). On the closure of the convent primary school, the Christian Brothers' College obtained the use of the River Street land. On the River Street side was CBC's primary school and on the Gregory Street side was CBC's secondary school. In 1987 Our Lady of Mercy College (an all-girls school) became Mercy College, a co-educational school for junior high school (Years 7–10) and St Patrick's became a co-educational school for Years 11 and 12. In 2023, Mercy College and St Patrick's College combined to become St Patrick's College; a Years 7-12 College operating across two campuses. The site of the former Mercy College became the Mercy Campus, for students in Years 7-10, whilst the St Patrick's College site was named the Senior Campus, for students in Years 11 and 12.

== Cultural life ==
There is a wide selection of cultural activities available within the college. Many students exhibit talent in public speaking, drama, music and the visual arts. St Patrick's College provides students with opportunities to further their creative skills, and encourages participation in cultural activities both in the college and the wider Mackay community.

The college participates in interschool debating and encourages students to enter competitions such as Lion's Youth of the Year, Youth Speaks for Australia, Rostrum Public Speaking and so on. The college has established a record in the areas of dramatic performance, debating and public speaking, with it being State Champions of Queensland in the Apex Debating Competition in 2005 and 2006, and National Champions in 2004. Debating is the school's most successful extracurricular, non-sporting activity.

St Patrick's College provides opportunities for students to develop their musical talents and provides opportunities for performance. Musical tuition is available through the college in brass, woodwind and percussion, and Music is available as a subject to study. Students have the opportunity to play in the stage band and concert bands which are combined bands with Mercy College Mackay. The St Patrick's choir has attained a high reputation in the community and the handbell ensemble (being one of the largest in the southern-hemisphere) is a unique and challenging musical experience for students. In 2006, the handbell ensemble attended the World Handbell Symposium in Brisbane and were delighted to receive the top mark in Youth strand for their performance. In 2009 co-curricular arts students travelled to New Zealand for the Rhapsody Rotorua music festival and the 25th Australasian Handbell Symposium.

St Patrick's is well-renowned in the community for its high-quality bi-annual theatre productions, which have included adaptations of The Wizard of Oz, How to Succeed in Business Without Really Trying, West Side Story (2006), Godspell (2008) and All Shook Up (2010) as well as award-winning original productions such as Bars (2007). In 2012 the college presented an adaptation of Andrew Lloyd Webbers' Cats, becoming one of the first schools in Australia to perform the production.

The college also hosts a cultural dinner and cultural soiree to showcase and acknowledge students’ talents and achievements. The lunchtime comedy theatre is one of the year's attractions. St Pats regularly produces musicals or theatre restaurants, and participates in the Mackay Festival of the Arts.

== Spiritual life ==
At St Patrick's College, all students must study a religion subject, and the college views those subjects as having the same status and importance as all other subjects in the college. Students have a choice to study either:

- Religion & Ethics or
- Study of Religion or
- Cert III in Christian Ministry and Theology

Both subjects are approved by the Queensland Studies Authority (QSA) and results from both subjects will appear on students’ senior certificates. Results from Study of Religion can contribute towards students’ O.Ps. Results from Religion & Ethics, however, do not contribute towards a student's O.P score.

As St Patrick's College is a Catholic school, the college participates in various liturgies, masses and other Catholic events. While it is not a requirement to be Catholic to be enrolled at the college, all students are expected to be respectful and reverent during times of prayer within the college.

== Sporting life ==
St Patrick's students are encouraged to participate in the many sports offered within the college. They can choose to study the subjects Physical Education or Recreation Pursuits in Years 11 and 12, which cover the theoretical and practical sides of sport. Physical Education contributes towards a students O.P score, but Recreation Pursuits does not.

An aquatics carnival, athletics carnival, triathlon, and a cross-country involve students in inter-house competition. The college sees these carnivals as an important part of school life and attendance is compulsory. In addition, there are inter-school carnivals and trials days in the following sports: athletics, Australian rules football, basketball, cricket/indoor cricket, cross country running, football, Futsal, hockey, netball, rowing, rugby league, rugby union, swimming, tennis, touch football, waterpolo, and volleyball.

Additionally, the school participates in chess tournaments run by Gardiner Chess once per term.

=== Australian Rules Football Honours ===
==== Junior Female (Years 7-9) ====
- North Queensland Schools Cup

(gold) Champions: (2) 2017, 2018

=== Houses ===
The houses at St Patrick's College are all named after significant members of the Catholic Church. Rice is named after the founder of the Christian Brothers, McAuley is named after the founder of the Sisters of Mercy, Colin is named after the founder of the Marists (Society of Mary), and Chisholm is named after an Australian pioneer who helped numerous poor women on the wharves of Sydney. As of 2004, the houses have been separated along gender and year level lines, for example, in 2004 Rice house was year 12 boys.

The houses are:

House		Named in honour of	Contribution
Colour	Name	Named in honour of	Contribution
	Rice	Edmund Ignatius Rice	Founder of the Congregation of Christian Brothers; saint
	McAuley	Catherine McAuley	Catholic nun who founded the Sisters of Mercy; saint
	Colin	Jean-Claude Colin	Founder of the Society of Mary (Marists)
	Chisholm	Caroline Chisholm	Social reformer and pioneer in Colonial New South Wales

== Notable alumni ==
- Mitchell Dunn – rugby league player
- Ben Barba – rugby league player and 2012 Dally M Medalist
- Martin Bella – rugby league player
- Daly Cherry-Evans – rugby league player and 2011 Dally M Rookie of the Year
- Glenn Christensen – classical violinist
- Cobi Crispin – bronze medal paralympian
- Graeme Connors – country music singer, songwriter, and performer
- Brett Dallas – rugby league player
- Nic Ffrost – swimmer – Olympic bronze medalist – 2012 Summer Olympics
- Tia Gostelow – Indigenous Australian singer-songwriter
- Shannon Hegarty – rugby league player
- Stephen Lambert – hockey player; Olympic games bronze medalist; two time Commonwealth Games gold medalist; Champions Trophy gold medalist
- Tim Mulherin – politician; MP for Mackay, and Deputy Leader of the ALP in Queensland
- Wendell Sailor – dual-code international rugby league and rugby union player and TV personality
- Matthew Swann – hockey player

== See also ==
- Catholic education in Australia
- List of schools in Queensland
