= Conrad Ta'akimoeaka =

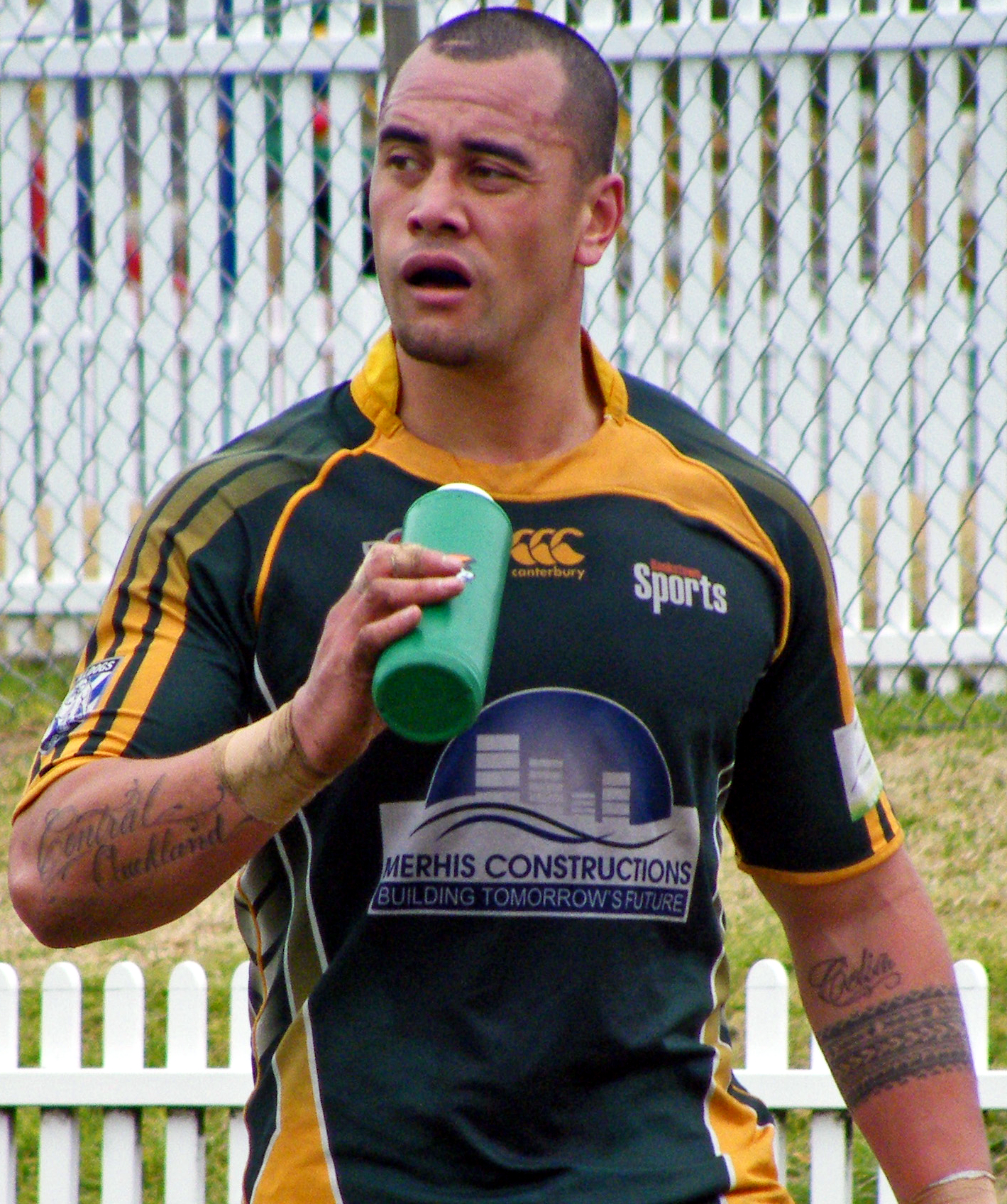

Personal information
- Full name: Conrad Ta'akimoeaka
- Born: 25 October 1984 (age 42) Auckland, New Zealand

Playing information
- Height: 184 cm (6 ft 0 in)
- Weight: 100 kg (15 st 10 lb)
- Position: Prop
Representative
Years	Team	Pld	T	G	FG	P
2006	Samoa	3	2	0	0	8

Conrad Ta'akimoeaka (born 25 October 1984) is a former Samoa international rugby league footballer who played as a prop.

== Background ==
Ta'akimoeaka was born in Auckland, New Zealand. He is of Samoan descent.

== Career ==
He was contracted to the Canterbury-Bankstown Bulldogs in the NRL.
