= Josh Bateman =

Australian rugby league footballer

Personal information
- Full name: Josh Bateman
- Born: 25 September 1986 (age 40) Grenfell, New South Wales, Australia
- Height: 183 cm (6 ft 0 in)
- Weight: 94 kg (14 st 11 lb)

Playing information
- Position: Five-eighth
Club
Years	Team	Pld	T	G	FG	P
2008	Penrith Panthers	2	0	0	0	0
- Source: As of 16 January 2019

Josh Bateman (born 25 September 1986) is a former professional rugby league footballer. He previously played as a five-eighth for the Penrith Panthers in the NRL.

Bateman was born in Grenfell, New South Wales, Australia.
