= St. Brendan's College, Yeppoon =

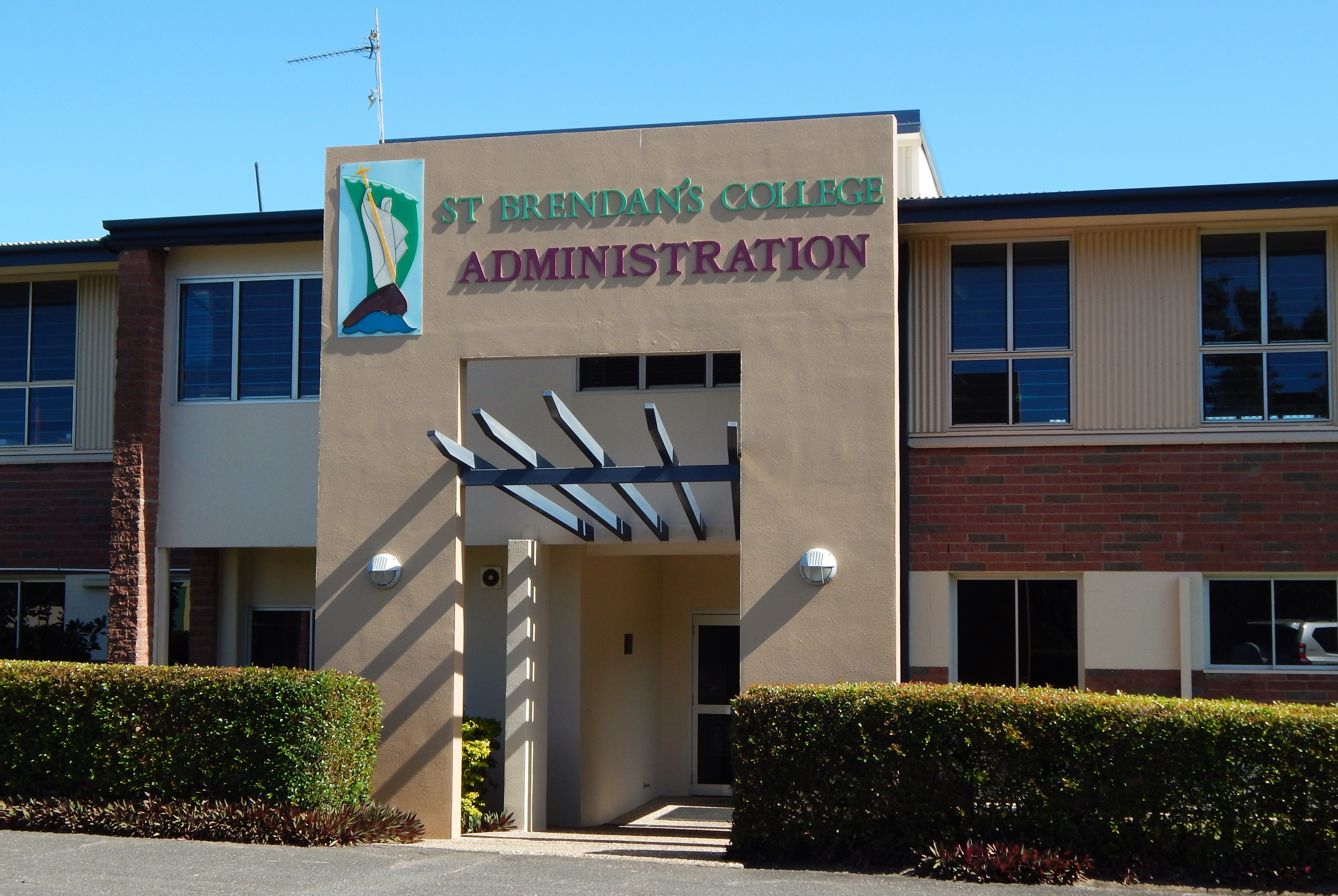
- St Brendan's College administration, 2022

Location
- 139 Adelaide Park Road; Yeppoon, Queensland, 4703; Australia; 23°07′09″S 150°43′38″E

Information
- Type: Independent secondary day and boarding
- Motto: Latin: Ne Dubita Dabitur (Do Not Doubt, It Will Be Given)
- Religious affiliation: Roman Catholic
- Denomination: Congregation of Christian Brothers
- Patron saint: Brendan, the Navigator
- Established: 1939
- Founder: Christian Brothers
- Oversight: Diocese of Rockhampton
- Trust: Edmund Rice Education Australia
- Principal: Robert Corboy
- Grades: 7–12
- Gender: Boys
- Houses: Duhig; Gettons; Hayes; Tynan
- Colours: Green and gold
- Website: www.stbrendans.qld.edu.au

St. Brendan's College (SBC) is an independent Catholic secondary day and boarding school for boys, located in Yeppoon, Queensland, Australia. The school was founded by the Congregation of Christian Brothers in 1940 and opened with a total of 59 students. The school describes itself as "Australia's Largest Country Boys Boarding School", and has educated several leading National Rugby League players.

== History ==
Groundbreaking for the school started on 8 October 1939 and presided by Romuald Denis Hayes, Bishop of Rockhampton. The school officially opened in February 1940 with 42 boarders and 17 day students. The first headmaster of St Brendan's was Brother Basil Gettons.

The school's spiritual and academic policies are rooted in the traditions of Edmund Ignatius Rice and the school is a member of Edmund Rice Education Australia. The school is named after Saint Brendan the Navigator.

St Ursula's College, Yeppoon, a separate Catholic all-girls day and boarding school located further into the centre of Yeppoon, has shared a close relationship with St Brendan's. Both schools share a relationship with a Catholic primary school in Yeppoon, Sacred Heart.

The college song, Bordered by blue waters splendid, details the rural surrounds of the school near Mary's Mount, as well as confirming strength in faith-based learning.

In September 2022, the Christian Brothers Oceania Province announced it would withdraw from St Brendan's College at Yeppoon at the end of the 2023 academic year, ending 84 years of Christian Brothers affiliation. A farewell mass took place August 28, 2023.

== House system ==
St. Brendan's College has four houses:

House		Name origin
Colour	Name	Name origin
	Duhig	Most Rev. Sir James Duhig KCMG, DD was the third Archbishop of Brisbane (1917–65) & the third Bishop of Rockhampton (1905–12)
	Gettons	Rev. Bro. J. Basil Gettons c.f.c. was the founding headmaster of St. Brendan's College (1940–45)
	Hayes	Right Rev. Romuald Hayes SSC, DD was the fifth Bishop of Rockhampton (1932–45)
	Tynan	Right Rev. Andrew Gerard Tynan DD was the sixth Bishop of Rockhampton (1946–60)

== Headmasters ==
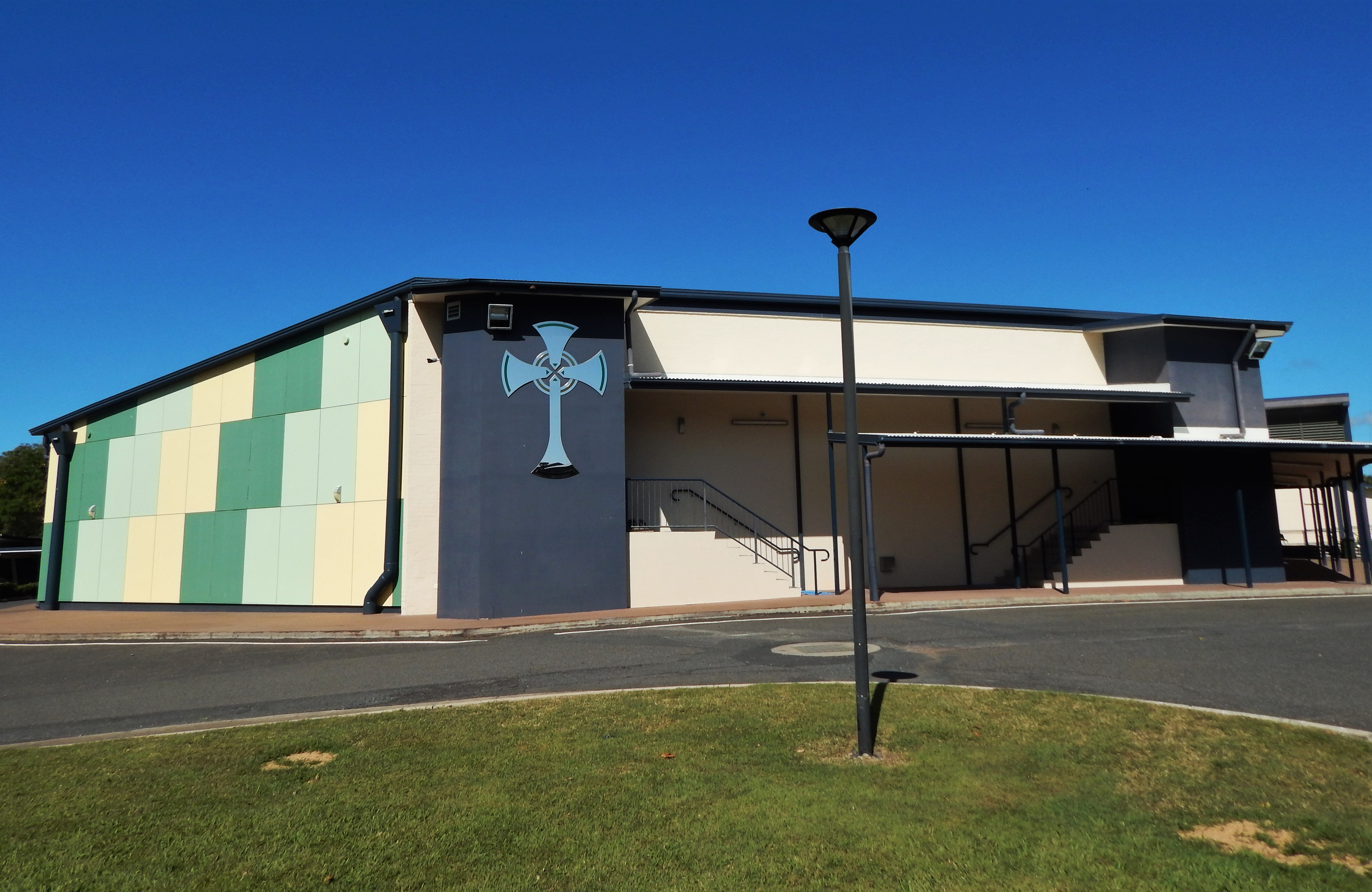
Chapel at St Brendan's, 2022

The Rector of St. Brendan's College has been a Christian Brother from the foundation of the college until the appointment of Simon Dash, the first lay principal, in 2003.

Ordinal	Officeholder	Term start	term end	Time in office	Notes
1	Bro. J. B. (Basil) Gettons c.f.c.	1940	1945	4–5 years	
2	Bro. H. I. Jackson c.f.c.	1946	1951	4–5 years	
3	Bro. J. B. Duffy c.f.c.	1952	1957	4–5 years	
4	Bro. N. B. Gallagher c.f.c.	1958	1960	1–2 years	
5	Bro. P. T. McSweeney c.f.c.	1961	1963	1–2 years	
6	Bro. M. F. Ziesing c.f.c.	1964	1969	4–5 years	
7	Bro. C. S. Wright c.f.c.	1970	1975	4–5 years	
8	Bro. D. F. Murphy c.f.c.	1976	1981	4–5 years	
9	Bro. R. J. White c.f.c.	1982	1988	5–6 years	
10	Bro. N. C. Langan c.f.c.	1989	1991	1–2 years	
11	Bro. D. J. McMahon c.f.c.	1992	1997	4–5 years	
12	Bro. R. S. Grundy c.f.c.	1998	2002	3–4 years	
13	Simon Dash	2003	2009	5–6 years	
14	G. McManus	2010	2011	0–1 years	Appointment concluded in Term 3, 2011
15	Nick Scully	2011	2017	5–6 years	Appointment commenced in Term 4, 2011
16	Robert Corboy	2018	incumbent	7–8 years	

== Student demographics and facilities ==
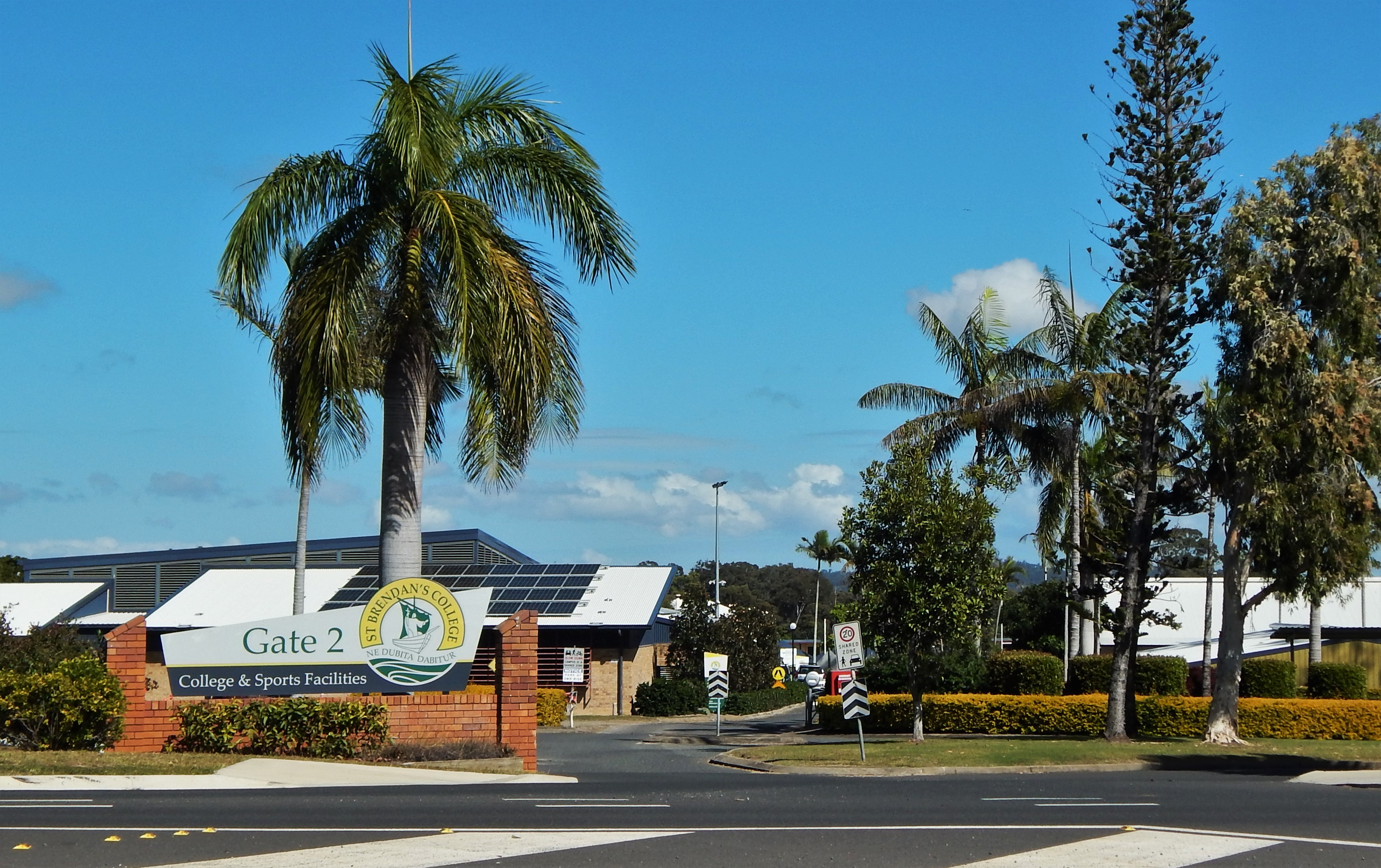
Entrance to college and sporting facilities at St Brendan's College, 2022

The school accepts students of all faiths and backgrounds.

The school hosts the largest rodeo of the CRCA circuit. The rodeo is held annually over the Father's Day weekend (the first in September in Australia). The school also holds a cattle club and stud program. The school allows students to bring their own cattle to prepare for shows.

== Associations ==
As one of the 27 Christian Brothers Colleges founded throughout Queensland, St. Brendan's College Old Boys continue to provide Officials, Coaches and Players to this uniquely Queensland Association of Brothers Old Boys Clubs.

- Confraternity of Brothers Clubs (Rugby League)
- Brothers Rugby Fraternity (Rugby Union)

== AFL Team Achievements ==
=== Junior Male (Years 7-9) ===
- AFL North Queensland Schools Cup

(gold) Champions: 2022

== Notable alumni ==
Politics, public service and the law

- Scott Buchholz – politician
- Bryan Jared Kramer – Member of Parliament, Papua New Guinea, since 2017
- John Momis – President of the Autonomous Region of Bougainville, 2010–present
- Henry ToRobert – banker and Papua New Guinean civil servant

Entertainment, media and the arts

- Gerry Connolly – comedian
- John Kasaipwalova – writer, activist

Sport

- Paul Bowman – rugby league footballer
- Casey Conway – rugby league footballer and male model
- Harry Grant – rugby league footballer
- Jake Granville – rugby league footballer
- Tom Humble – rugby league footballer
- Ben Hunt – rugby league footballer
- Kurt Mann – rugby league footballer
- PJ Marsh – rugby league footballer
- Corey Oates – rugby league footballer
- Julian O'Neill – rugby league footballer
- Owen Pattie – rugby league footballer
- Jonus Pearson – rugby league footballer
- Jamie Simpson – rugby league footballer
- Matthew Scott – rugby league footballer
- Dave Taylor – rugby league footballer
