= Jarrad Hickey =

Australian rugby league footballer

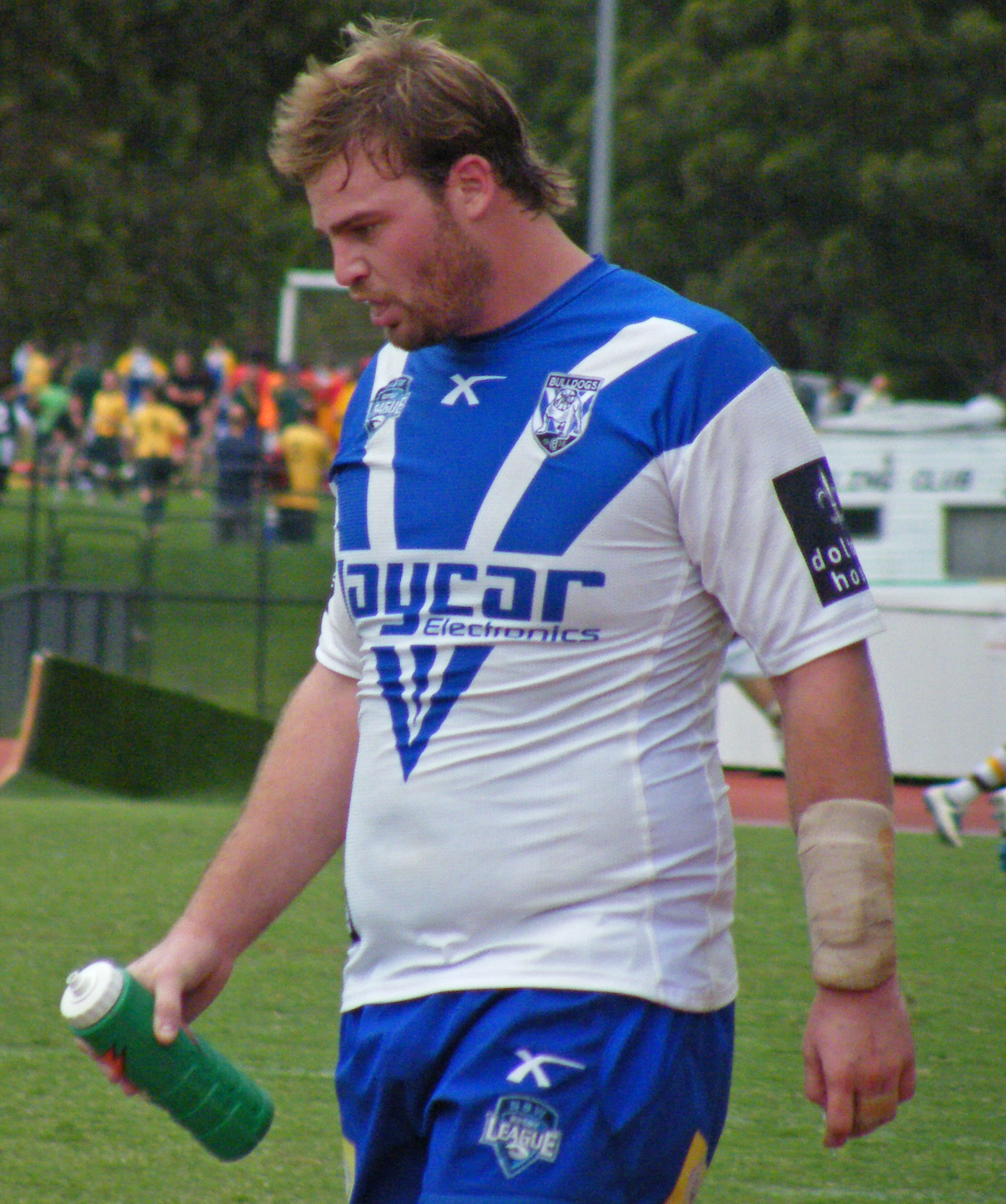

Personal information
- Full name: Jarrad Hickey
- Born: 7 May 1985 (age 40) Sydney, New South Wales, Australia
- Height: 195 cm (6 ft 5 in)
- Weight: 120 kg (18 st 13 lb)

Playing information
- Position: Prop
Club
Years	Team	Pld	T	G	FG	P
2006–10	Canterbury Bulldogs	72	8	0	0	32
2011	Wakefield Trinity Wildcats	8	2	0	0	8
	Total	80	10	0	0	40
- Source: As of 17 January 2019

Jarrad Hickey (born 7 May 1985) is an Australian former professional rugby league footballer who played in the 2000s and 2010s for the Canterbury-Bankstown Bulldogs and the Wakefield Trinity Wildcats.

== Background ==
Hickey was born in Sydney, New South Wales, Australia.

== Career ==
Hickey played rugby league for St. Christopher's at Panania in his junior years.

Hickey played with Canterbury-Bankstown from 2006 until 2011. He was eligible for Ireland.

On 15 April 2011 Hickey was signed by Super League club Wakefield Trinity Wildcats on a 2-year deal.

Midway through 2012 Hickey signed with NSW Cup team: Illawarra Cutters.

In 2014 Hickey played for Collegians RLFC in the Illawarra Coal League.
