= Tim Winitana =

NZ rugby league footballer

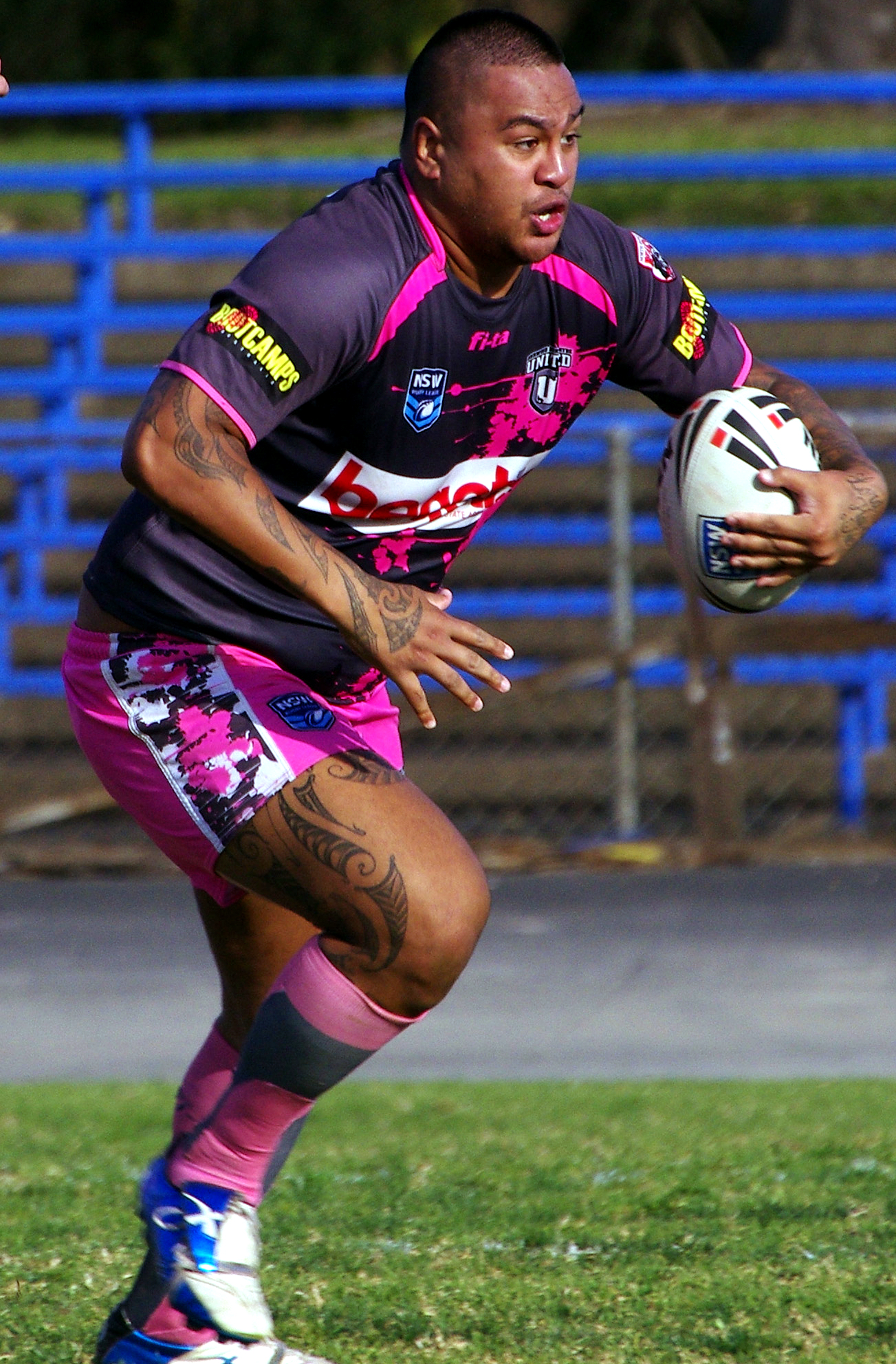

Personal information
- Full name: Tim Winitana
- Born: 29 April 1987 (age 38); Wellington, New Zealand
- Height: 184 cm (6 ft 0 in)
- Weight: 94 kg (14 st 11 lb)

Playing information
- Position: Centre, Wing, Second-row
Club
Years	Team	Pld	T	G	FG	P
2007–10	Canterbury Bulldogs	27	10	0	0	40
- Source: As of 17 January 2019

Tim Winitana (born 29 April 1987) is a former professional rugby league footballer who played as a centre for the Canterbury-Bankstown Bulldogs in the NRL between 2007 and 2010.

== Background ==
Winitana was born in Wellington, New Zealand.

== Playing career ==
Winitana made his debut for Canterbury-Bankstown against the Brisbane Broncos in round 14 of the NRL season on 15 June 2007 after first choice centre Willie Tonga was not selected for disciplinary reasons.

Winitana made 22 appearances the following year in the 2008 NRL season and scored 10 tries as Canterbury finished last on the table.

In 2011, Winitana signed with the Penrith Panthers but made no appearances for the first grade side. Winitana then moved to Newcastle, New South Wales to play for the Macquarie Scorpions in 2012.
