= Gary Warburton =

Australian rugby league footballer

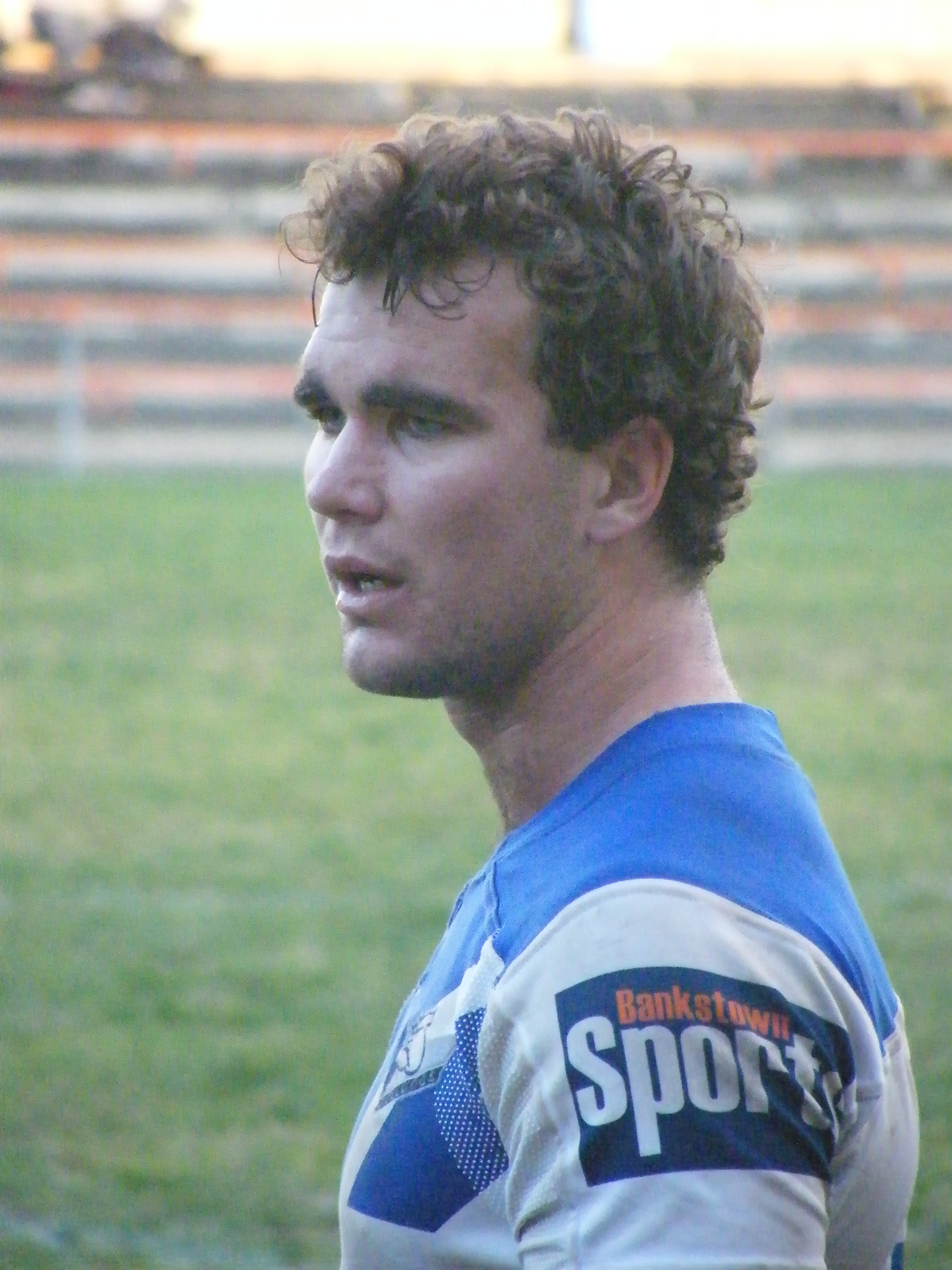

Personal information
- Full name: Gary Warburton
- Born: 15 November 1987 (age 37) Griffith, New South Wales, Australia
- Height: 186 cm (6 ft 1 in)
- Weight: 99 kg (15 st 8 lb)

Playing information
- Position: Second-row
Club
Years	Team	Pld	T	G	FG	P
2008–11	Canterbury-Bankstown	57	3	0	0	12
- Source: As of 17 January 2019

Gary Warburton (born 15 November 1987) is an Australian former professional rugby league footballer who played for the Canterbury-Bankstown Bulldogs in the National Rugby League. Warburton primarily played in the second-row.

== Background ==
Warburton was born in Griffith, New South Wales, Australia.

== Playing career ==
Warburton made his first grade debut for Canterbury in round 6 2008 against St George. Warburton made a total of nine appearances for Canterbury in his debut year as the club finished last on the table. The following year, Warburton played 25 games for the club as they finished 2nd on the table in the 2009 NRL season.

Canterbury were one of the favorites to take out the premiership and reached the preliminary final that year against arch rivals Parramatta. Canterbury lost the match 22-12 in front of a non-grand final record crowd of 74,549 with Warburton playing in the match.

In 2010, Canterbury failed to back up their performances from 2009 and finished 13th in 2010 with Warburton making 18 appearances. Warburton's final game for the club came in round 26 2011 against Canberra.

Warburton played for Wests Wollongong in the Illawarra Coal League for the next two seasons, winning the premiership in one of those.

In 2013, Warburton returned to his junior club Milton Ulladulla Bulldogs. He captained the side with his father Ross Warburton the Coach.
