= Heka Nanai =

Australian rugby league footballer

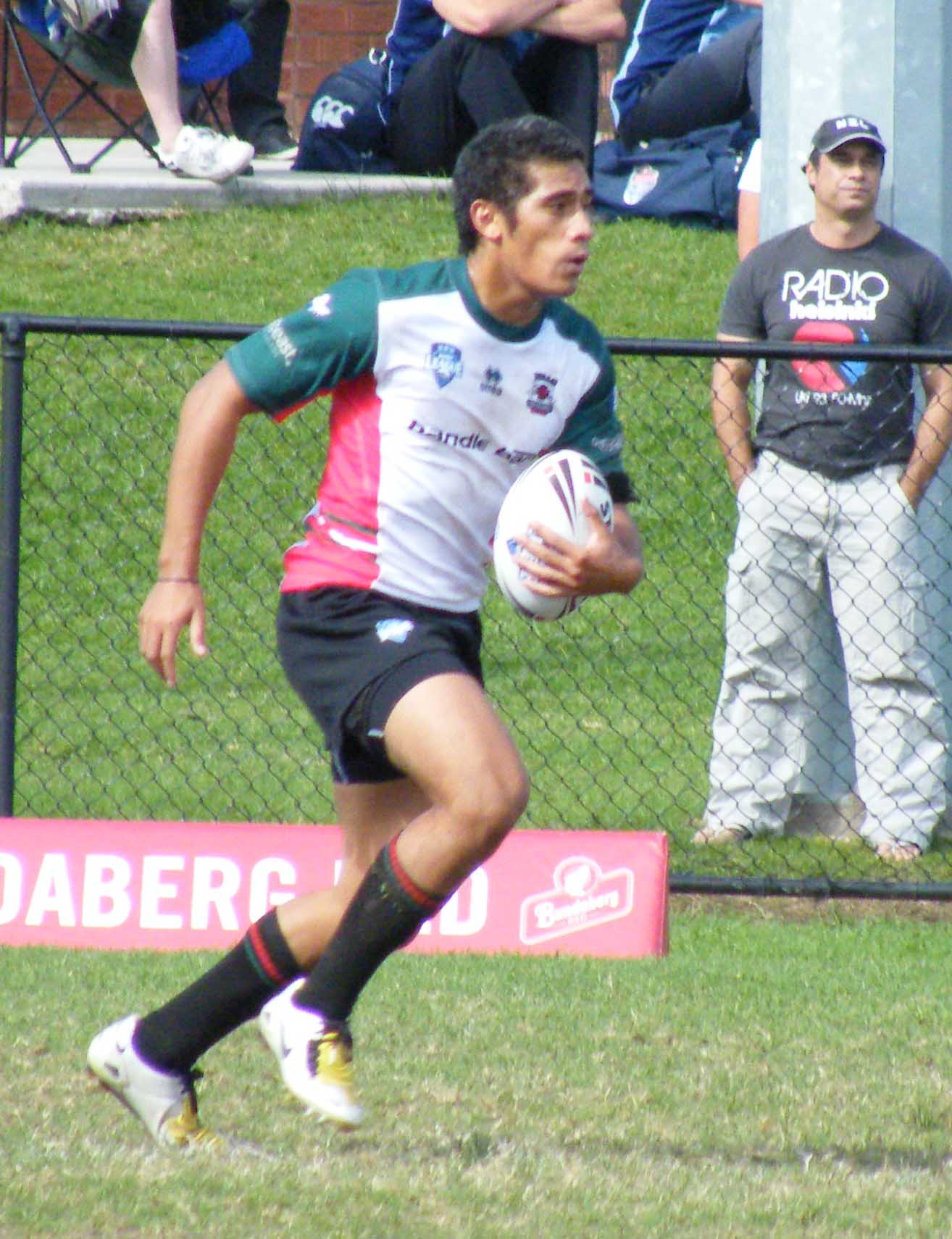

Personal information
- Full name: Heka Nanai
- Born: 15 August 1988 (age 37); Canterbury, New South Wales, Australia
- Height: 183 cm (6 ft 0 in)
- Weight: 98 kg (15 st 6 lb)

Playing information
- Position: Wing, Centre
Club
Years	Team	Pld	T	G	FG	P
2007–10	Canterbury-Bankstown	22	14	0	0	56
- Source: As of 17 January 2019

Heka Nanai (born 15 August 1988) is an Australian former professional rugby league footballer who played in the 2000s and 2010s for Canterbury-Bankstown. Nanai played on the wing or in the centres.

== Early years ==
Nanai was a graduate of Westfields Sports High School located in Fairfield West. Westfields is a sports school that has produced players such as Jarryd Hayne, Liam Fulton, Krisnan Inu, Luke O'Donnell and Mark Minichiello.

== Playing career ==
Nanai made his debut for Canterbury against the Sydney Roosters in Round 16 of the NRL season on 2 July 2007. Nanai scored his first try in Round 19 against the Gold Coast Titans.

In 2008, Nanai was Canterbury's leading try scorer with 14 for the season. Nanai then played in the Bundaberg Red Cup for Saint Johns Eagles. In 2014, Nanai played the majority of the season for the Auburn Warriors in the Ron Massey Cup

== International career ==
On 2 October 2007, Nanai was called up to represent the Junior Kangaroos as a replacement for Jarryd Hayne, who was chosen for the Senior Kangaroos side.
