= Brad Morrin =

Australian rugby league player

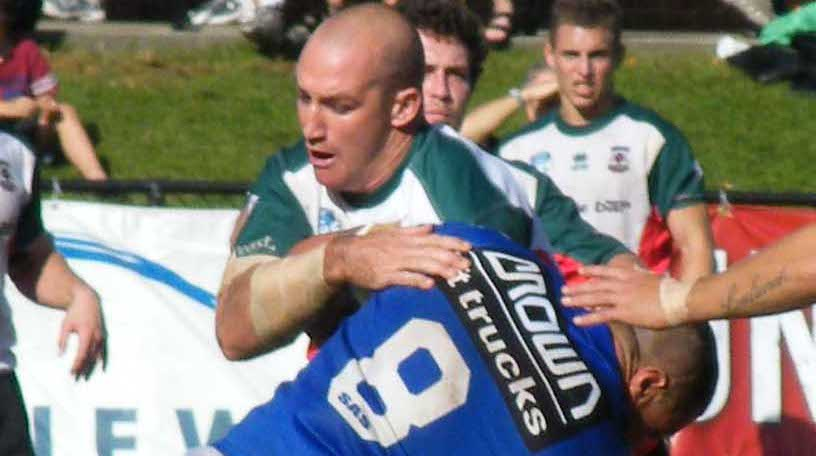

Personal information
- Full name: Bradley Morrin
- Born: 23 September 1981 (age 45) Liverpool, New South Wales, Australia

Playing information
- Height: 187 cm (6 ft 2 in)
- Weight: 102 kg (16 st 1 lb)
- Position: Second-row, Prop
Club
Years	Team	Pld	T	G	FG	P
2005–11	Canterbury Bulldogs	56	3	0	0	12
- Relatives: Kurtis Morrin (nephew)

Brad Morrin (born 23 September 1981) is an Australian former professional rugby league footballer who played as a second-row forward for the Canterbury-Bankstown Bulldogs in the NRL.

== Background ==
Morrin was born in Liverpool, New South Wales, Australia.

He is the uncle of Kurtis Morrin.

== Playing career ==
Morrin made his first-grade debut for Canterbury in round 7 of the 2005 NRL season against Newcastle at the Newcastle International Sports Centre, scoring a try in a 24-20 victory.

In the 2006 and 2007 seasons, Morrin featured sporadically for the first-grade team. In the 2008 NRL season, Morrin played 20 games as Canterbury finished last on the table.

He played eight games the following year as Canterbury-Bankstown finished second on the table, but Morrin did not feature in the club's finals campaign.

Morrin later extended his contract with Canterbury until the end of the 2011 NRL season. He then played front row with the Northern Suburbs Bulldogs in the Illawarra Coal Cup. After retirement, Morrin went on to play in the Legends of League tournament in 2017, 2018 and 2019.

== Controversy ==
In 2005, Morrin was fined $5000 by Canterbury after an incident at a Melbourne pub. According to Morrin, he was trying to hail a cab at 3am so he could get something to eat. Morrin had tried several times to get a taxi but ended up walking in the middle of the road and hailing down a passing motorist. Morrin told the media, "A car stopped in front of me and I opened the back door to ask the driver if I could get a lift. He got out of his car and looked upset. I explained I thought he had stopped to give me a lift and I apologised for alarming him.” The incident was witnessed by police who arrested Morrin and took him back to the police cells, where he was later released.

In round 21 of the 2007 NRL season, Morrin was put on report for biting the arm of Parramatta Eels player Timana Tahu. He was suspended for eight weeks and did not feature for the club again that year.

Consequently, Morrin was affectionately referred to on the popular online Bulldogs fan forum The Kennel as "The Nibbler".
