= Danny Williams (rugby league, born 1986) =

Australian rugby league footballer

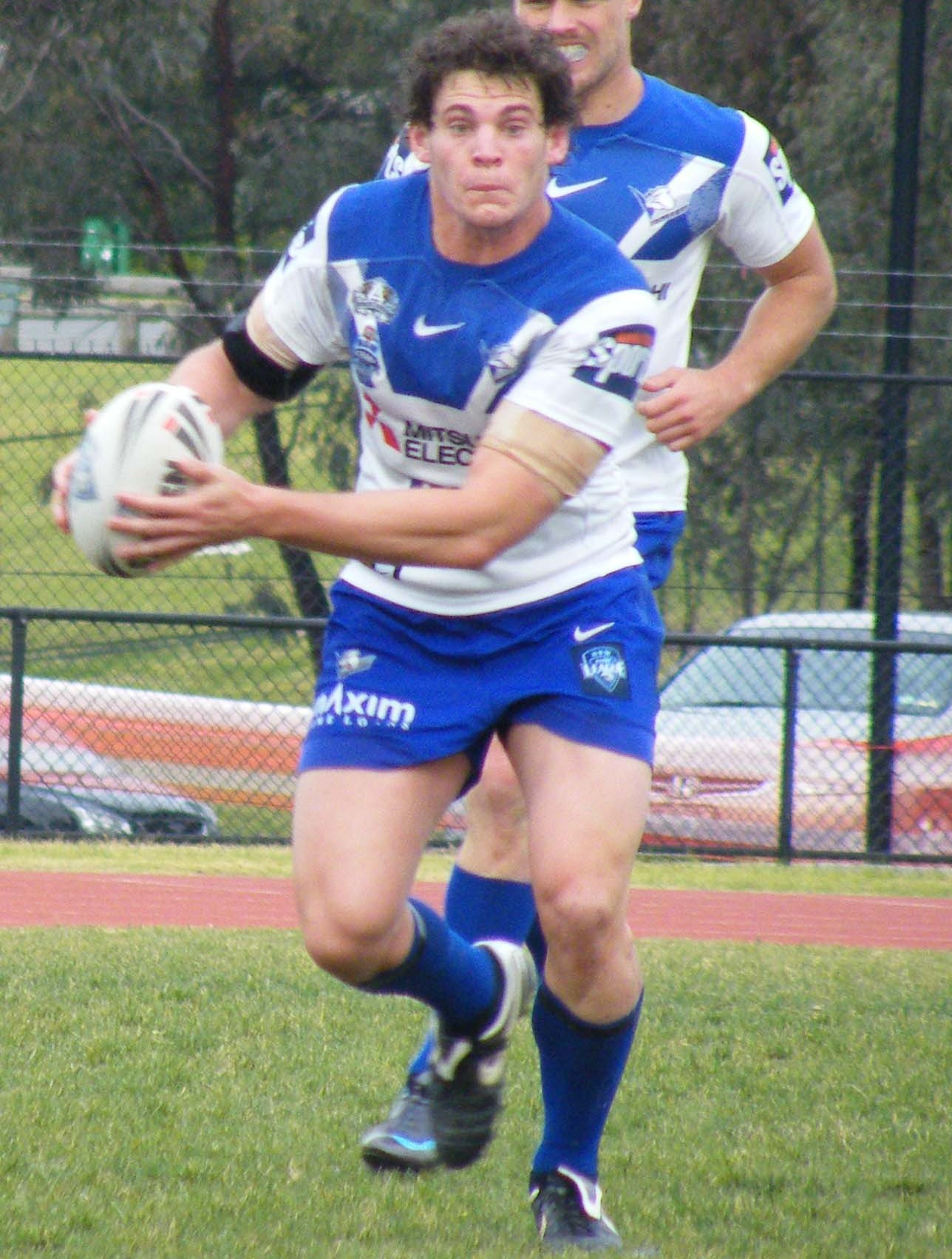

Personal information
- Full name: Daniel Williams
- Born: 1 October 1986 (age 38); Ipswich, Queensland, Australia

Playing information
- Height: 183 cm (6 ft 0 in)
- Weight: 116 kg (18 st 4 lb)
- Position: Prop, Second-row
Club
Years	Team	Pld	T	G	FG	P
2007	Sydney Roosters	5	0	0	0	0
2008–10	Canterbury Bulldogs	9	1	0	0	4
	Total	14	1	0	0	4

Danny Williams (born 1 October 1986) is an Australian former professional rugby league footballer who previously played for the Canterbury-Bankstown Bulldogs and the Sydney Roosters.

== Early life ==
Williams was born in Ipswich, Queensland, Australia.

Williams attended highschool in Mackay and played juniors with Brothers Bulldogs JRLFC before playing a grade for Mackay Souths until he signed up with Sydney Roosters at the age of 16. After attending an Australian school boys tour in England in November 2003, Williams moved to Bondi with partner Laura, to begin his first grade career.

== Playing career ==
Williams made his debut for the Sydney Roosters in Round 13 2007 against North Queensland. Williams scored his first and only try in his NRL career for Canterbury in a Round 6 30–18 win over the St George Illawarra Dragons on 19 April 2008.
