= History of the Canterbury-Bankstown Bulldogs =

History of Australian rugby league team

The history of the Canterbury-Bankstown Bulldogs stretches from the 1930s to the present day. Based in Belmore, a suburb of Sydney, the Bulldogs in 1935 were admitted to the New South Wales Rugby Football League (NSWRFL) competition, a predecessor of the current NRL competition.

The Bulldogs won their first premiership in just their fourth season (1938). At the time it made them the quickest club (barring the founding clubs) to win a premiership after admission to the competition, a record which was only beaten in 1999 by the Melbourne Storm. They won a second premiership in 1942 but then had to wait another 38 years before breaking through for a third title in 1980. During the 1980s, the Bulldogs were a dominant force in the competition appearing in five Grand Finals, winning four of them. In the 1990s they featured in the 1994, 1995 and 1998 Grand Finals, winning the title in 1995 over Manly. Their most recent success was in 2004 when they beat the Sydney Roosters 16–13, the tryscorers being Hazem El Masri and Matt Utai, and the Clive Churchill Medal winner Willie Mason.

== Origin ==
The Canterbury-Bankstown region in Sydney's southwest had a thriving rugby league culture and local competition from 1922 onwards, By 1930 the club had won the President's Cup competition and afterwards applied repeatedly to join the Sydney senior competition, finally being successful on 24 September 1934. The main barrier had been the lack of a suitable ground, which the NSWRL had set as a condition of entry. The club covered as territory the municipalities of Bankstown and Canterbury, taking them from St George and Western Suburbs. It would share the suburbs of Earlwood and Hurlstone Park with Newtown. It took part for the first time in 1935.

== 1935: Debut season ==
Canterbury played its first premiership match against North Sydney on Anzac Day, 25 April 1935 at North Sydney Oval. In a match refereed by Tom McMahon, North Sydney won by a margin of 20 points to 5. Scorers for Canterbury-Bankstown were a try to Jack Hartwell Sr. and a penalty goal to Tom Carey. Hartwell was a prop forward, whilst Carey was a halfback or five-eighth who had been a Canterbury junior before playing with St George.

The first Canterbury team was: George Main, Vince Dwyer, Jack Morrison (c), Sid Elliott, Basil Crawford, Harry Brown, Tom Carey, Frank Sponberg, Alan Wellington, Jack McConnell, Jack Hartwell Sr., Bob Lindfield and Fred Chaplin and was coached by Tedda Courtney.

Canterbury's initial season was a remarkable one – for the wrong reasons. Playing without a home ground, the team suffered a number of massive losses, losing in successive weeks during May 6–91 to St George and 7–87 to Eastern Suburbs – the two heaviest defeats in the history of the competition. The club managed to avoid the wooden spoon by twice defeating the winless University, but still conceded 140 tries in sixteen matches or an average of 8.75 tries per game, which remains the second-highest figure in NSWRFL/NRL history behind the 9.08 tries per game conceded by University in their debut 1920 season.

== 1936–1942: Early success ==
After the disastrous 1935 season, Canterbury became determined to achieve success and especially to improve the backline – the chief cause of the 1935 failures. They bought fullback Tom Kirk from Tumut, centre and captain Alan Brady from Western Suburbs, threequarter Joe Gartner from Newtown and ex-Bluebag prop Henry Porter from Goulburn. Along with champion coach Frank Burge, these buys improved the Cantabs from 1935's two wins to nine in 1936, netting a place in the finals.

In 1938, the Cantabs suffered only one loss, and a first title, defeating former nemesis Easts 19–6 in the final. Instrumental in the club's success was the front row combination of props Eddie Burns and Henry Porter and hooker Roy Kirkaldy. The club also won the reserve grade premiership the same year. Canterbury made the grand final again in 1940 but lost to Easts 24–14. After losing their semi-final in 1942, Canterbury finished on top of the ladder with Balmain in 1942, and secured the minor premiership after the NSWRL ruled that a play-off was necessary and they beat the Tigers 40–20. Canterbury were defeated by St George 35–10 in the semis, but as minor premiers had the right to challenge in a grand final which saw them defeat the Dragons 11–9 in wet conditions after the scores were even at half-time.

== 1943–1966: Decline as a Power ==
Remarkably – though largely due to the influence of World War II which deprived them of stars Porter and Newham, along with Bob Farrar and Bob Jackson – Canterbury fell from premiers in 1942 to wooden spooners in each of the following two seasons. As players returned from service in the war, the club did regain its strength, finishing sixth in 1945, third in 1946 and on top of the table in 1947. They finished the competition three points clear of the Balmain Tigers with Newtown and Wests making up the four. They beat Newtown 25–15 in the first semi but lost to Balmain 19–25 in the final. As they had been minor premiers, they had the right of a rematch to force a Grand Final. However, Canterbury were unsuccessful, going down 9–13 after leading 7–4 at half time.

Their loss of the 1947 campaign was, more than the lapse of 1943 to 1945, the end of their first successful period. With the retirement of the famous front three of Eddie Burns, Roy Kirkaldy and Henry Porter (remarkably, none ever played for Australia owing to the war), Canterbury was unable to develop top-line players or attract established stars to its ranks, for the club's budget in this era was largely devoted to the establishment and development of their licensed club. The club's financial position is the late 1950s was so precarious that only a loan from patron Stan Parry prevented the club from closing down.

Ron Willey was their sole Australian international between 1948 and 1962, but never played a Test match, whilst long-serving hooker Fred Anderson was the only Canterbury player between 1954 and 1962 to reach even State representation. Even a spell by Australian coach Vic Hey in 1955 and 1956, and the presence of other renowned mentors Col Geelan and Cec Cooper did not life the Berries up the ladder.

In 1948 they won only seven games, and after at one point looking like a surprise minor premiership in 1953 collapsed to never win more than six in a season from 1954 to 1959. Between 1952 and 1959 Canterbury were second last on five occasions (only Parramatta denying them the wooden spoon in four cases) but in 1960 under the coaching of club legend Burns they made the semis in an unparalleled four-way play-off. However their finals campaign only lasted one match as they lost to Easts 16–9 in the second semi-final. In the following seasons, they slipped back down the ladder quickly: after beating Easts on 6 July 1963 they did not win again until 25 July 1964. However, the emergence of skillful fullback Les Johns gave them hope, and despite finishing third last in 1966, the next year they made the Grand Final.

In March 1962, the Berries won their first honours since their 1942 premiership, beating Western Suburbs 14–10 in the Preseason Cup final under floodlights at the Sydney Sportsground.

The Berries' most persistent weakness during this long drought lay in attack: Canterbury did not score so many as fifty tries in any season between 1951 and 1969, and between 1954 and 1961 the highest season's try tally by any individual Canterbury player was just seven by five-eighth Ray Gartner in 1960. The Berries' one potential prolific tryscorer, winger and local junior Barry Stenhouse, suffered a career-ruining leg muscle injury in 1954, a season after scoring fourteen tries and sharing a Sydney Morning Herald "Player of the Year" award with Keith Holman.

== 1967: the "intercept" Grand Final ==
In 1967 Canterbury were captain-coached by tough forward Kevin Ryan, who had joined them from St George and helped them break his former club's extraordinary run of eleven straight premierships by beating them 12–11 in the preliminary final after being down 9-0 early on. Prior to this, Canterbury had finished third in the regular season, three points behind South Sydney and four behind minor premiers St George. Their semi-final campaign started well, beating Easts 13–2, before victory over the Dragons. They lost to Souths in the premiership decider, in a match best remembered for Bob McCarthy's intercept try. The match had been a close one, with Souths leading 10–8 at half time, before Canterbury drew level for much of the second half. Souths gained the lead four minutes from full-time with an Eric Simms goal following a penalty for an incorrect scrum feed by Canterbury half Ross Kidd. For the losers, fullback Les Johns, second-rower Kevin Goldspink and centre Bob Hagan all stood out.

== 1968–1977: Reformation and rebuilding years ==
The following few years saw mixed fortunes for the club on the field, with a sudden decline in 1968 and 1969 followed by a semi-final berth in 1970 (though they immediately bowed out by losing 12–7 to St George) and a return to mid-table in 1971 and 1972. However, off the field the club was developing administrative strength that would restore it to the status of a "power" for the following thirty seasons.

Canterbury made the semis again in 1973, coming fifth in the first year the competition had a final five rather than four. Though they lost to Newtown, this heralded better times as the club made the semis every year for the rest of the decade, apart from 1977 when the team was heavily hit by injuries.

1974 proved more promising, as the club finished third on the ladder behind a runaway Roosters outfit coached by Jack Gibson, and Manly. They then defeated both clubs – Manly 20–14 and Easts 19–17 to be the first through to the Grand Final. However, missed opportunities in an initially tight game lead to a 19–4 defeat. This had been the first Premiership decider Canterbury had played in since 1967.

== 1978–1983: The Entertainers ==
Peter "Bullfrog" Moore was the administrator at the Canterbury club from 1970 to 1995. During this time the team had consistently good results. In the late 1970s and early 1980s, Canterbury-Bankstown, under coach Ted Glossop, acquired the nickname The Entertainers. With halfback Steve Mortimer the linchpin, the Bulldogs (as they were in 1978) played a brand of football that was the envy of the Sydney Premiership.

The arrival of Steve Mortimer and Bob McCarthy in 1976 signalled a new beginning at the Canterbury club. McCarthy only had two seasons with the team but his experience, knowledge and effect left a lasting impression with a new generation of forwards coming through the ranks, which included Steve Folkes, Graeme Hughes and Geoff Robinson.

In 1976, Canterbury just barely made it into the final five, finishing fifth, then beat Easts and St. George before losing to Manly 15–12 at the last hurdle before the Grand Final, with a Bob Fulton field goal late in the match.

Canterbury-Bankstown started off with promise but missed the semis in 1977, losing four out of their last five regular season matches and finishing seventh. They then scraped into fifth position again for 1978, but were the first team out of the playoffs losing 22–15 to Parramatta.

They came fifth for a third time in four years in 1979, with the following four weeks of Finals in 1979 proving to be a turning point for the club and the beginning of their success in the 1980s. Inspired by Mortimer and led by Test captain George Peponis, the Bulldogs disposed of Cronulla, Wests and Parramatta to make the Finals. St George won the Grand Final 17–13 with the Bulldogs staging a second half comeback after being down 17–2 at the break.

The 1980 season was a watershed year for Canterbury and they would win their first Premiership since 1942. Canterbury played consistent football all season to finish in a tie for top position with Eastern Suburbs having the superior for and against. They defeated Wests and Easts to make it through to the Grand Final having the week off. Eastern Suburbs were favoured to win the decider but the unheralded Bulldogs pack outmuscled the Easts pack with Steve Mortimer doing the rest. Mortimer completely outplayed opposing half Kevin Hastings with Canterbury winning 18–4. Chris Anderson scored the Bulldogs first try but the Grand Final will always be remembered for Steve Gearin's performance where he landed six goals from six attempts. Gearin chased through a bomb by fullback Greg Brentnall 40 m out and caught the ball in mid-air despite the best attempts from Hastings and David Michael to prevent the try. The Grand Final was also famous for the three Mortimer and three Hughes brothers playing in the clash.

As premiers, Canterbury-Bankstown did not buy significantly in the following couple of years and paid the penalty. Crippled with injuries they fell to tenth in 1981, and in 1982 stood ninth among 14 clubs in a newly expanded competition. Despite finishing third in 1983, the gap between Parramatta and Manly and the rest of the Premiership was massive. The style of football that worked for Canterbury in 1979-80 was now outdated with the club looking in a new direction. Warren Ryan would be appointed coach and the Bulldogs would quickly go from the Entertainers to the Enforcers in very quick time.

== 1984–1989: "Wozzaball" ==
At the end of 1983 the board decided to go on a major rebuilding exercise. New coach Warren Ryan was brought on board, together with a collection of new players. Some of the major signings by Ryan and Chief Executive Peter Moore included 1983 Dally M Player of the Year Terry Lamb and Brian Battese from Wests, Queensland forward Darryl Brohman from Penrith, hooker Mark Bugden, Phil Gould and Peter Kelly from Newtown, and prop Peter Tunks from Souths. Canterbury-Bankstown went from the "Entertainers" to the "Enforcers". Young fullback Mick Potter's form led to him becoming 1984 Dally M Player of the Year. Canterbury-Bankstown finished the season as minor premiers four points in front of rivals St. George and Parramatta. They beat Parramatta in the major semi-final 16–8 before marking their fiftieth season by beating them again for the 1984 Premiership. However, it did not come without controversy. Ryan would drop long serving veterans Garry Hughes and club captain Chris Anderson to reserve grade.

Canterbury's success over the coming five seasons was achieved using a new aggressive, defensively oriented way of playing, later named by some as "Wozzaball". This brand of football worked with Canterbury nullifying the attacking skil of Parramatta to win the decider 6–4 at the Sydney Cricket Ground.

Canterbury started the next year patchily but won their last seven matches to lie third on the ladder at the end of the regular season behind minor premiers St. George and Balmain. They accounted for Balmain 14–8 before being beaten by the Dragons 17–6. Then they comprehensively crushed Parramatta 26–0 before making it back-to-back titles when they defeated St. George 7–6 in the Grand Final. Led by captain Steve Mortimer, Canterbury constantly bombed St. George, which forced a rule change in the catching of the ball in the in goal area.

Finishing third in the regular season behind Parramatta and a rejuvenated Souths, the Bulldogs could not follow up with a hat-trick of titles losing the 1986 Grand Final 4–2 to the Parramatta side. No tries were scored.

Ryan's era at Canterbury ended after the 1987 season when he left the club on bad terms after the Bulldogs narrowly missed the semi-finals for the first time since 1982 – despite Ryan's success from 1984 until 1986. He is the only Canterbury coach to win two Premierships and when the Bulldogs named their greatest side in 2004, no coach was named.

Phil Gould succeeded Ryan as coach and in his first year was in charge as the Canterbury club won the 1988 Grand Final against the Ryan-coached Balmain Tigers 24–12, the first at the new Sydney Football Stadium. It was a great and consistent season following the disappointment in 1987. 1988 also marked the final season for Canterbury legend Steve Mortimer, who stood down as captain after round 4. Mortimer suffered a broken wrist in the second last round but was fit enough to play-off the bench in the Grand Final victory. Mortimer retired with a club record 267 first grade games next to his name and at the time the most first grade games for one individual club. Mortimer captained the club to Premiership success in 1984 and 1985 and was a member of the 1980 and 1988 triumphs. He captained New South Wales in three State of Origin matches, winning all of them, giving the Blues their first triumph in 1985.

== 1990–1999: Chris Anderson Era ==
The "Wozzaball" era came to an end in 1989 when the Canterbury side struggled and Gould left the club to join Penrith. Chris Anderson returned as coach for the 1990 season and cleaned out the Ryan era, building the club around another club great in Terry Lamb.

Anderson had left the Bulldogs in 1984 and played the remaining years of his career with Halifax RLFC where he was captain-coach. Anderson intended to return to Canterbury but his commitments with Halifax in 1987-88 meant he could not take on the coaching position until 1989. Phil Gould's success in 1988 saw Anderson take on the Under 21s position in 1989 and he was promoted to first grade, which saw Gould leave on bad terms and join the Penrith Panthers.

One of Anderson's first jobs as first grade coach was appoint Terry Lamb as captain ahead of Paul Langmack. This caused some controversy at the time. Anderson was in the first stages of cleaning out the "Wozzaball" era and built his team around Lamb. Warren Ryan, now coaching Western Suburbs, would snare four former Canterbury players Langmack, Andrew Farrar, David Gillespie and Joe Thomas whilst Paul Dunn followed Gould to Penrith Panthers and Jason Alchin joined St. George Dragons.

Canterbury-Bankstown enjoyed encouraging results in 1991 led by Lamb with support from 1991 Rothmans Medal winner Ewan McGrady and "the Welsh Wizard" Jonathan Davies with youngsters such as Darren Smith, Jarrod McCracken, Dean Pay and Simon Gillies coming through the ranks. The Bulldogs were inconsistent in 1992 and Peter Bullfrog Moore went on a recruitment drive snaring Martin Bella, Jim Dymock, Jim Serdaris and Gary Connolly. Canterbury won the Minor Premiership with Lamb leading the way but they fell short in the Finals losing to St. George and Brisbane.

Goal kicking wizard Daryl Halligan joined the Canterbury club in 1994 and he booted a then club record of 270 points including the match-winning drop goal in the 1994 Major Semi-final against Canberra Raiders at the Sydney Football Stadium. Darren Britt and Jason Smith emerged as leading players. Canberra were far too good on Grand Final day winning 36–12 with Mal Meninga enjoying a great exit from the game.

Canterbury were confident heading into the 1995 season with a new home at Parramatta Stadium but the uproar of the Super League War caused Jim Dymock, Dean Pay, Jason Smith, and Jarrod McCracken to announce mid-season they were to leave the club. Their form before Super League was patchy and it was to get worse with demoralizing losses against Manly 26–0, 19th place Parramatta, Newcastle 42-0 and Auckland 29-8 putting the season in doubt. Two major turning points was the switch of the final round match against the North Queensland Cowboys to Belmore Sports Ground and Chris Anderson dropping Kiwi International Jarrod McCracken to reserve grade. Anderson would later omit McCracken from the overall squad. The Bulldogs defeated the North Queensland Cowboys in a club record 66–4 victory and laid the platform for the Finals ahead.

The club defeated St. George 12–8, the Brisbane Broncos 24–10, and the 1994 Premiers Canberra 25–6. The Grand Final saw them up against the ARL's pin-up club the Manly-Warringah Sea Eagles in an ultimate Super League-ARL match. The Canterbury side were never headed winning 17–4 with Lamb leading the way in an inspirational (and controversial) performance. One of the tryscorers that day for Canterbury was future club captain, Steve Price, who was starting in only his 3rd first grade match.

The Anderson-Lamb coach-captain era at the club lasted six seasons and they worked on a very successful rebuilding program. Lamb announced his retirement after the Grand Final but would play on for another year in 1996 to help the sudden loss of players due to the ARL departures. Lamb however decided not to stand for the leadership leaving it for Simon Gillies. When Gillies was injured, Lamb again opted not to be captain with Darren Britt taking control for the final nine matches. Lamb's six seasons as Canterbury captain saw the club rebuild and emerge back again as a force following the great 1980s era and Lamb in 2004 would be named captain in Canterbury's 'Greatest Ever Team'.

Another era ended following the 1995 season with the retirement of Chief Executive Peter Moore after 26 years in power. Moore came into power in 1969 with the backing of captain-coach Kevin Ryan and brought in a complete reformation of the Bulldogs club, which saw it emerge as a competitive force in the 1970s and a rugby league powerhouse in the 1980s. Moore took on a position as Super League recruitment officer and he would retain his position on the Canterbury Leagues Club board until 1998. He was first diagnosed with cancer in 1998 and beat the first round but it returned in 2000 and lost his battle for life on 5 July. Moore's record at Canterbury was five Premierships and nine Grand Finals in 26 seasons.

=== Super League War ===
When the Canterbury administration saw the Super League war on the horizon they re-branded the club the "Sydney Bulldogs". The club were one of the clubs most damaged by the big split in Australian rugby league and lost five key players for the 1996 season with Dean Pay, Jason Smith, Jim Dymock and Jarrod McCracken joining arch-rivals Parramatta Eels and Brett Dallas linking with North Sydney Bears. Compared to their three previous seasons, they did poorly, and scrambled to finish 10th in the ARL Premiership.

The 1997 season saw Canterbury play in the Super League competition and was the first without club legend Terry Lamb who finally retired after 349 first grade matches. The Bulldogs finished in fifth position in the ten-team competition. Chris Anderson quit the club at the end of the 1997. Anderson joined the newly formed Melbourne Storm with reserve grade coach Steve Folkes taking over the head coaching position.

Super League and the ARL compromised at the end of 1997 and formed the National Rugby League, which saw Canterbury playing arch-rivals Parramatta Eels, St. George Dragons and the Western Suburbs Magpies once again.

The Canterbury side struggled in 1998 as the effects from the Super League War and the retirement of Terry Lamb were still being felt. Simon Gillies was replaced mid-season as captain by Darren Britt and that sparked a Bulldogs revival. Canterbury won their last four matches to scrape into ninth position as the National Rugby League that season used a "Top 10" Finals format.

Just prior to the Finals, it was revealed that former Chief Executive Peter Moore was diagnosed with cancer. The Bulldogs lifted to new levels as an inspiration to 'Bullfrog' and in the first two weeks of the Finals defeated St. George Dragons 20-12 (ultimately their last match as a stand-alone club) and North Sydney Bears 23–12, both victories on away soil. The followed week without Craig Polla-Mounter the Bulldogs came from 16–0 down to defeat the Andrew Johns Newcastle Knights 28–16 with the scores locked at 16-all at full-time.

The most famous semi-final came the next week against arch-rivals Parramatta with Pay, Dymock, Smith and McCracken in their line up. The Parramatta side led 18–2 with 11 minutes remaining before Craig Polla-Mounter inspired a comeback. Canterbury scored three tries in the period of seven minutes to bring it back to 18–16 with Daryl Halligan landing a sideline goal to level up the scores before Polla-Mounter nearly got a win in regular time, with a field goal just falling under the cross-bar. Canterbury would go on to win 32–20 in extra-time.

The Brisbane Broncos won the Grand Final 38-12 (after leading 12–10 at half time). The Super League War was now forgotten in a short period of time as they forged into a new era under the guidance of coach Steve Folkes.

The 1998 season also marked the farewell to Belmore Sports Ground as the Bulldogs home ground. The decision to leave Belmore upset many of the club's loyal supporters as the ground had so much history to it. Belmore was Canterbury's home for 547 matches between 1936–98 and they had a great record on home soil. Belmore was also the home ground for the Parramatta Eels between 1982 and 1985 as their new stadium was being built and St. George Dragons played at Belmore in 1988. Only the Sydney Cricket Ground, Sydney Sports Ground and North Sydney Oval have hosted more Premiership games than Belmore Sports Ground. Overall, Belmore hosted 602 Premiership games.

Despite opposition from many supporters, Canterbury moved to Stadium Australia for the 1999 season and finished the Premiership rounds in fifth position with confidence gained from the Finals success in 1998 and signing new recruits Darren Smith, Bradley Clyde and Ricky Stuart. The Canterbury side were defeated in the second week of the Finals with Melbourne Storm's Matt Geyer swooping on a Stuart kick to seal victory in the dying minutes of the game.

In 1998, the Bulldogs won the President's Cup competition.

== 2000–2003: The salary cap drama ==
The club's fallout from a disappointing 2000 season saw a "new breed" of players coming through for 2001. The Bulldogs' outfit aged badly in 2000 with many players past their best and a massive cleanout happened with several new players on the way including Nigel Vagana, Luke Patten, Brett Howland and Darrell Trindall. The Bulldogs finished the Minor Premiership in second position but crashed out of the Finals. The Dally M Rookie of the Year that season was Braith Anasta. Mark O'Meley was signed up for the 2002 season as the club said farewell to captain Darren Britt and his deputy Craig Polla-Mounter. With both of those gone, Steve Folkes opted for Steve Price as captain ahead of the more experienced Darren Smith.

Trouble returned in a big way in 2002, with the Club being found guilty of salary cap breaches described by NRL Chief Executive David Gallop as "exceptional in both its size and its deliberate and ongoing nature". The club received a $500,000 fine, and was stripped of all 37 competition points; the club, who were poised to take the Minor Premiership and had won 17 consecutive matches, won the wooden spoon as a result.

Club legend Steve Mortimer was brought in to save the club, and the Bulldogs then finished one game short of the Grand Final in 2003.

== 2004 Premiers ==
At the start to the 2004 season a major off-field scandal allegedly involving Bulldogs players in Coffs Harbour. A number of unidentified players were accused of gang raping a 20-year-old woman at a resort in Coffs Harbour, New South Wales. The woman filed a complaint with Coffs Harbour police alleging that she had been vaginally, orally and anally raped by multiple members of the Bulldogs team in the pool area of the Pacific Bay Resort, where the team had been staying, in the early hours of Sunday 22 February. On 27 April, New South Wales Director of Public Prosecutions Nicholas Cowdery informed detectives that he did not believe there was sufficient evidence to prosecute any Bulldogs players. The police accordingly decided not to lay charges.

Following the incident Football Manager Garry Hughes was sacked and Steve Mortimer stepped aside as Chief Executive. Former Test forward Bradley Clyde was named the new Football Manager and News Limited Executive Malcolm Noad taking over from Mortimer. The controversy was considered a major public relations nightmare for the club with significant media coverage. The NRL announced that the Bulldogs would be fined $150,000, and an additional $350,000 if there were any other allegations of off-field misbehaviour before the end of the 2004 season. NRL chief executive officer David Gallop said that the fine had been imposed because during the months of media scrutiny the club had failed to behave "in a way which protected the game's image". In 2006, Bulldogs chief executive Malcolm Noad said that the allegations had led to the loss of millions of dollars of sponsorship money, and to continuing negative beliefs in the community about Bulldogs players and supporters. He said that even two years after the events, Bulldogs fans were sometimes taunted as 'rapists' at matches. In 2018, former Canterbury player Johnathan Thurston spoke out on the allegations, stating that the actions were consensual, and he wasn't involved.

The Canterbury side endured a nightmare start to the season, but a string of good results culminated in defeating the Sydney Roosters 16–13 in the Grand Final. The Bulldogs season started slowly but they worked their way into being genuine Premiership contenders, which included big wins against the Sydney Roosters, Penrith Panthers and Brisbane Broncos to finish the regular season on equal standing with eventual runners-up the Roosters, however due to points differential the Bulldogs were deemed to have finished second.

Finals newcomers the North Queensland Cowboys upset Canterbury 30–22 in the first week of the Finals. The Bulldogs powered past the Melbourne Storm 43–18 in the second week of the Finals. Three tries and five goals from Hazem El Masri saw the club topple 2003 Premiers Penrith 30–14 in the Preliminary Final.

The Grand Final against the Sydney Roosters was a tense battle between the clubs. The Bulldogs came back from 13–6 down at halftime to triumph 16–13. This victory saw the Bulldogs defense keep the Roosters scoreless for the entire second half. This victory was especially meaningful as the clubs were historically rivals. Matt Utai scored two tries with Hazem El Masri also scoring. Willie Mason was named Clive Churchill Medal Winner. Stand-in captain Andrew Ryan ultimately made the winning tackle, stopping Roosters forward Michael Crocker from scoring in the final seconds of the match.

Warriors-bound club captain Steve Price missed the game due to injury sustained the week before in the semi-final victory against Penrith. Price's value and respect in the team was noticeable on Grand Final night when Ryan called up Price to hold the trophy and say a few words, whilst Johnathan Thurston gave Price his Grand Final ring.

Following their Grand Final victory, the Canterbury side travelled to England to play in the 2005 World Club Challenge against Super League premiers, the Leeds Rhinos. The match was played on 4 February 2005 at Elland Road in front of 37,208 with the home team coming out winners in the end of a high-scoring match, with a final scoreline of 39–32.

== 2005−2019: Downs followed by Ups followed by Lower Downs ==
Canterbury were unable to mount a serious defence of the title in 2005 as injuries and contract negotiations saw the year start and finish on a sour note for the club. Due to the extent of injuries suffered, the team at times was unable to be at full-strength. This took its toll in the final six weeks of the season, the club suffering heavy losses and missing the finals series.

In 2006, little was expected from the club after a lacklustre 2005 season, but despite some doubt over the strength of their side, the Bulldogs' impressive forward pack helped them to a better than expected result for the year, finishing just a game short of the Grand Final, in which they lost to eventual premiers the Brisbane Broncos.

The 2008 season was a tumultuous one for the Bulldogs. They finished at the bottom of the ladder, but the main news of the season was the controversial departure of star player Sonny Bill Williams.

A huge player recruitment drive saw Canterbury reverse their fortunes in the 2009 NRL season. Canterbury finished in second place during the 2009 and made it all the way to the preliminary final before they were defeated by arch rivals the Parramatta Eels in front of a record non-grand final crowd of 74,549. Canterbury had gone into the game as favourites despite Parramatta's dream run at the back end of the season.

Alan Thompson, a long-time supporter of the Canterbury-Bankstown Bulldogs, was appointed general manager of the club's football operations on 15 April 2010.

In 2012, Canterbury-Bankstown finished first on the competition ladder to take out their first minor premiership since 1994. They made it to the Grand Final, losing to the Melbourne Storm 14–4.

In May 2013, former Netball New Zealand chief executive Raelene Castle was appointed CEO, the first female in the NRL's history. They finished the regular season sixth on the ladder and bowed out in the semi-final.

In 2014, Canterbury-Bankstown made history by winning three consecutive games by one point, from Round 5 to Round 7. They finished runners up to the South Sydney in the grand final.

On 10 August 2017, Canterbury-Bankstown announced Rugby League World Cup CEO Andrew Hill as the replacement for outgoing boss Raelene Castle. On the appointment, chairman Ray Dib noted that "Andrew was appointed from a very strong list of candidates and has exceptional experience in the game of rugby league." In September 2017, Canterbury announced that former premiership winning player Dean Pay would be the new coach at the club starting in 2018, Pay's stint as coach finished during the 2020 season.

The 2018 season started off badly for Canterbury with the club only winning 3 of its first 10 matches. In May 2018, the new Canterbury board admitted that they would not be able to make any major signings until the end of the 2021 season due to the salary cap drama engulfing the club.

The issue with the salary cap problems involved the previous administration and former coach Des Hasler who signed numerous players on back ended deals. In the wake of the scandal, the club was forced to offload players to free up room in the cap.

This resulted in Moses Mbye departing for the Wests Tigers and star recruit Aaron Woods being sold to Cronulla after only signing with Canterbury months prior. On 16 June 2018, Canterbury suffered a humiliating 32–10 loss to the Gold Coast Titans at Belmore, in the press conference coach Dean Pay said "Physically, we just weren't good enough. The way they turned up, the way they trained during the week wasn't good enough, I feel sorry for the fans".

On 20 July 2018, Canterbury played against arch rivals Parramatta in what the media had dubbed as the "Spoon Bowl" with both sides sitting at the bottom of the ladder. There were fears before the game that the match would attract the lowest NRL crowd in over 20 years. Parramatta went on to win the match 14–8.

After the defeat by Parramatta, Canterbury were facing the prospect of finishing with the wooden spoon for the first time since 2008 but over the coming four weeks the club managed to pull off upset wins against the Wests Tigers, the Brisbane Broncos and St George Illawarra Dragons to finish the season in 12th place.

On 3 September 2018, Canterbury found themselves in trouble with the NRL after it was revealed that players who had been celebrating mad Monday were behaving badly. It was alleged that Canterbury players had been photographed stripping naked and one player vomiting in the street. NRL CEO Todd Greenberg issued a statement saying "We had a very detailed discussion with all 16 clubs and the eight clubs that weren't playing, There's no doubt we'll take some action, I've asked the club today for a report. I expect that report to be on our desk within 24 hours". On 6 September 2018, The NRL handed Canterbury a $250,000 fine over the mad Monday incident with players Asipeli Fine and Adam Elliott both receiving a $25,000 fine (including $10,000 suspended) by the club. Elliott and Fine were also issued with court attendance notices for wilful and obscene exposure. Two other Canterbury players Marcelo Montoya and Zac Woolford also received fines of $10,000 each ($5000 suspended).

The lower grades of Canterbury performed better in 2018 with the club winning the Intrust Super Premiership defeating Newtown 18–12 in the final and also winning the NRL State Championship defeating Redcliffe 42–18.

Canterbury started off the 2019 NRL season losing their two first games in convincing fashion against the New Zealand Warriors and rivals Parramatta. Due to the bad start to the season, there were rumours that coach Dean Pay would be relieved of his duties but he was then granted a 12-month contract extension to remain as Canterbury coach until the end of 2020.

By the midway part of the 2019 NRL season, Canterbury-Bankstown found themselves sitting last on the table and in real danger of finishing with the wooden spoon. However, for the third straight season, Canterbury achieved four upset victories in a row over Penrith, the Wests Tigers, South Sydney and Parramatta who were all competing for a place in the finals series and were higher on the table. Pay was credited with the late season revival as the side focused heavily on defence.

== 2020−present: Start of a new decade ==
On 10 March 2020, Canterbury were rocked by another off-field scandal just two days before the start of the 2020 NRL season after it was alleged two Canterbury players Jayden Okunbor and Corey Harawira-Naera met two school girls during a school visit on a pre-season trip to Port Macquarie earlier in March, whilst a sexual encounter was alleged to occur, the school girls were of the age of consent and there was no criminal investigation pending. Both players were asked to "show cause" why the NRL should not cancel or suspend their registrations as players.

On 11 March 2020, it was revealed that Okunbor had used Instagram to contact one of the school girls. In a leaked message obtained through Fox Sports, Okunbor said to the school girl "Yeah had to have a good look, what are we doing tonight?, Okay, okay, we're you at the school today?". It was also revealed one of the two players sanctioned had sexual intercourse with a teacher from another school during the same pre-season trip.

On the same day, it was revealed that because of the two players actions, new major sponsor Rashays had canceled their $2 million sponsorship with the club. Rashays had signed on to become Canterbury's front of shirt sponsor. Rashays owner Rami Ykmour released a statement saying "It's a shame two players could wreck it for everyone, It's disgusting. It's repulsive, to be honest. That's something else. If they sack them, I would stand by the club and the NRL's decision".

On 14 July, Dean Pay formally resigned as the head coach of Canterbury, after failing to bring them back to the finals. Steve Georgallis took over as interim coach for the remainder of the season. On 14 July, Canterbury announced they had appointed Phil Gould as their general manager after the Warriors released him, hoping that he would get the club back on track. On 22 July, Canterbury announced the signing of Panthers assistant coach Trent Barrett as head coach for 3 years. Canterbury finished the 2020 NRL season in 15th place on the table after a horror year on and off the field. Canterbury finished on equal points with Brisbane but avoided the wooden spoon due to a slightly better for and against record.

Canterbury started the 2021 NRL season poorly losing their opening three matches including being kept scoreless in round 2 & round 3 against Penrith and Brisbane respectively. This was the first time in the club's history that this had occurred. In round 4 of the 2021 NRL season, Canterbury were defeated 38–0 by South Sydney in the traditional Good Friday game. Canterbury became only the second team in the NRL era to lose three straight games without scoring a point after Cronulla who achieved this in the 2014 NRL season.

It was also the worst start to a season by any team since Glebe in the 1928 NSWRFL season who managed to only score 12 points in their first four matches. Canterbury went on to have one of their worst years ever, only managing 3 wins during the season against Cronulla, St George Illawarra, and Wests Tigers, and receiving the club's 6th wooden spoon.

Canterbury started the 2022 NRL season on a win, beating the North Queensland Cowboys 6–4. However, they lost their next six games, including a 44–0 defeat against Melbourne in round 4. Canterbury upset the Sydney Roosters in round 8, winning 16–12, but the damage was done. After a 16–6 loss to the Newcastle Knights in round 10, Barrett stood down as head coach of Canterbury on 16 May. On 18 May, Michael Potter was announced as the interim coach for the remainder of the season. Potter had a better season with the club, winning five of the remaining 14 rounds, including an upset victory over fierce rivals Parramatta in round 14, winning 34–4. Canterbury finished the 2022 season in 12th place, with 16 points. On 14 August, Canterbury announced they had signed Penrith assistant coach Cameron Ciraldo on a five-year deal, starting in 2023.

Canterbury started the 2023 season with a 31–6 loss to Manly, but quickly bounced back with a shock 26–12 win against the Melbourne Storm in round 2, their first win against the Melbourne club since Round 6, 2016.

In round 18 of the 2023 NRL season, Canterbury suffered their equal third worst loss as a club when they were defeated 66-0 by Newcastle. Canterbury would finish the 2023 NRL season in 15th place. The club also finished with the worst for and against out of all 17 teams with a -331 points differential.

In the 2024 NRL season, Canterbury qualified for the finals finishing 6th on the table. This was the first time in eight years that the club had managed to achieve this. However, they lost their elimination finals match 24-22 against Manly at Stadium Australia. Canterbury started the 2025 NRL season in great form winning their opening six games and equalling their best start to a campaign since 1938. In round 8, the club suffered their first loss of the year against Brisbane which ended with a score line of 42-18.

== Sponsorship history ==
Year	Jersey Manufacturer	Major Sponsor	Sleeve Sponsor	Shorts Sponsor
1980–81	Classic	Electronic Sales & Rentals		
1982	Classic	Joyce Mayne Discounts		
1983	Classic	General Corporation Japan (Aust.) (Fujitsu General (Aust.) )		
1984–90	Classic	HFC Financial Services		
1991	Classic	HFC Financial Services	Mobil	
1992	Classic	HFC Financial Services		
1993–96	Classic	Hyundai	Cenovis	
1997	Nike	Canterbury League Club	Cenovis	
1998–99	Nike	Stardome	Cenovis	
2000	Nike	realestate.com.au	Cenovis	
2001–02	Nike	National Telecoms Group	ADCO Constructions	
2003	Nike	Mitsubishi Electric	ADCO Constructions	
2004–05	Nike	Mitsubishi Electric	Auto Group Motor Auctions	Yes Home Loans
2006	Nike	Mitsubishi Electric	Q.L.D. Group	Bill Express
2007	Nike	Mitsubishi Electric	Bankstown Sports Club	Bill Express
2008	Nike	Mitsubishi Electric	Bankstown Sports Club	Bill Express

'Yes Home Loans' shifted their sponsorship to 'back of jersey' in 2006 and onward in a new move allowed by NRL regulations.
