= Kevin Moore (rugby league) =

Australian RL coach and former rugby league footballer

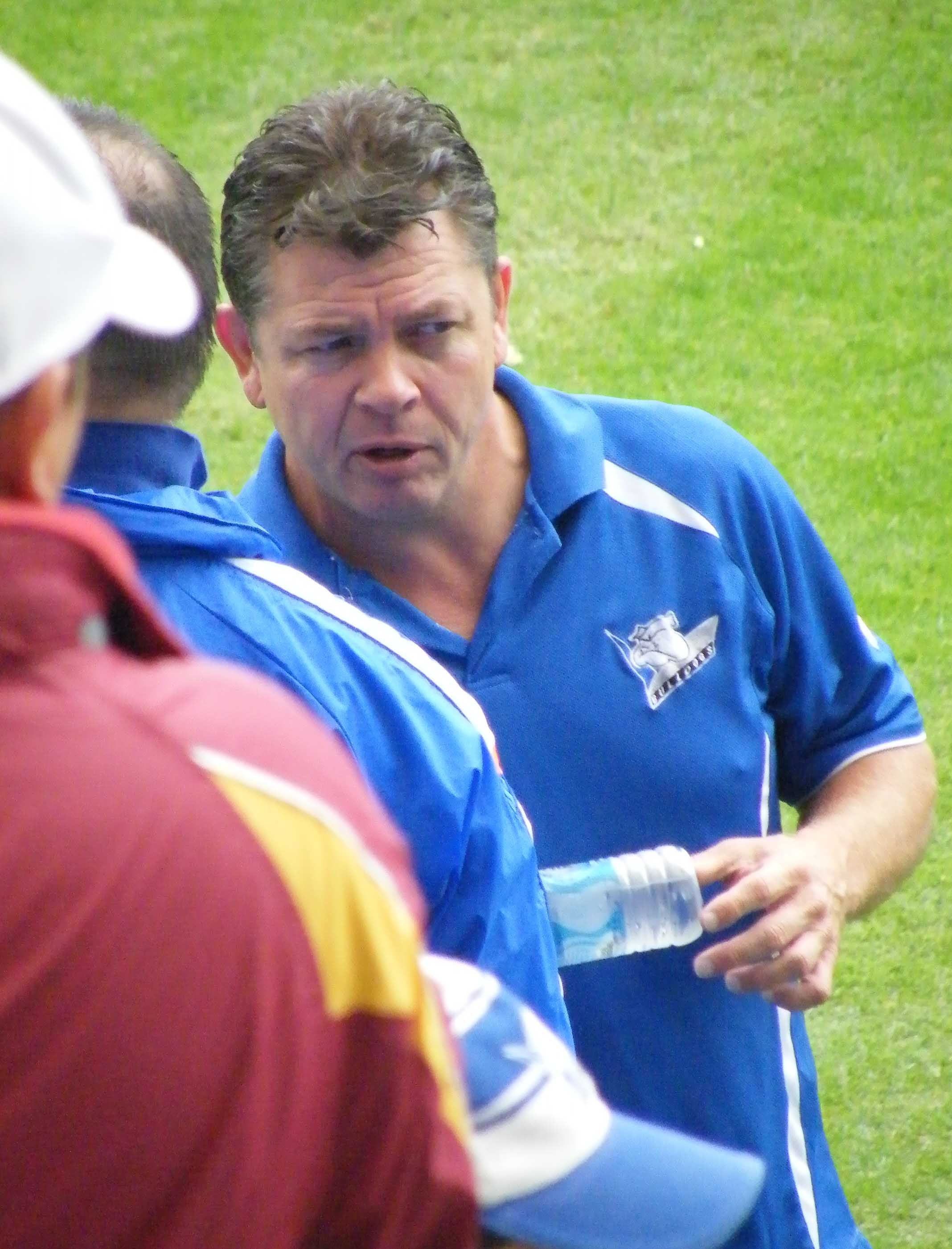

Personal information
- Born: 30 November 1965 (age 60) Lakemba, New South Wales, Australia

Playing information
- Height: 1.70 m (5 ft 7 in)
- Weight: 80 kg (12 st 8 lb)
- Position: Halfback
Club
Years	Team	Pld	T	G	FG	P
1984–86	Halifax
1989–94	Canterbury Bulldogs	37	7	0	0	28
	Total	37	7	0	0	28

Coaching information
Club
Years	Team	Gms	W	D	L	W%
2009–11	Canterbury Bulldogs	49	27	0	22	55
- Father: Peter Moore
- Relatives: Lynne Anderson (sister); Steve Folkes (brother-in-law); Chris Anderson (brother-in-law); Garry Hughes (cousin); Graeme Hughes (cousin); Mark Hughes (cousin); Jarrad Anderson (nephew); Ben Anderson (nephew)

Kevin Moore (born 30 November 1965) is an Australian former rugby league football coach and player.

== Playing career ==
As a player, he played as a scrum-half. He played for the Halifax team in the Championship (1984–1986). He then joined the Canterbury-Bankstown Bulldogs team in 1989, where he remained until 1994.

== Coaching career ==
Moore became the head coach for the Canterbury-Bankstown Bulldogs of the NRL from the 2009 season and was named in place of Steve Folkes after his retirement. He led the club to a second-place finish in 2009 and guided them all the way to the preliminary final before they were defeated by arch rivals the Parramatta Eels in front of a record non-grand final crowd of 74,549. Canterbury had gone into the game as favorites despite Parramatta's dream run at the back end of the season.

Moore was sacked midway through the 2011 season after the club underachieved in the ensuing two years, failing to make the finals in either 2010 or 2011.

== Personal life ==
He is the son of Peter "Bullfrog" Moore. He is also brother-in-law to his predecessor, former Canterbury coach Steve Folkes.
