= Lynne Anderson (sports administrator) =

Australian sport administrator

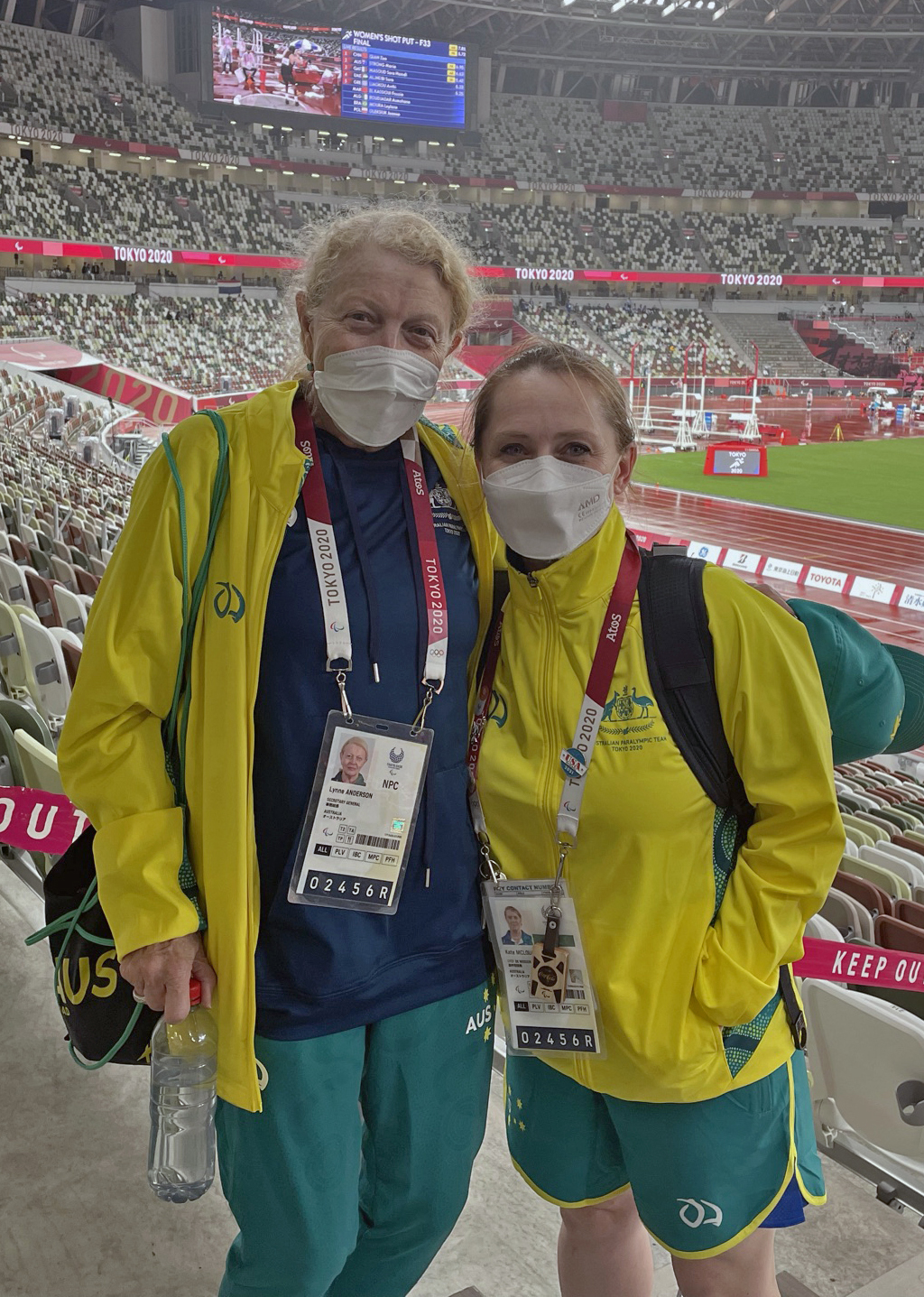
Lynne Anderson (left) with Kate McLoughlin (chef-de-mission Australian Paralympic team) at the Tokyo 2020 Paralympic Games

Lynne Anderson (nee Moore) is an Australian sport administrator. She has been the Chief Executive Officer of Paralympics Australia and Chair of the Canterbury-Bankstown Bulldogs.

Anderson is the daughter of Marie and Peter "Bullfrog" Moore, who was Chief Executive of the Canterbury Bankstown Bulldogs Rugby League Club from 1969 to 1995. She is from a family of nine children. Her brother Kevin Moore played for Canterbury Bankstown Bulldogs and coached them from 2009 to 2011. Her husband is Chris Anderson played for Canterbury Bankstown Bulldogs from 1971 to 1984.

At the age of 35, Anderson started a Bachelor of Commerce at the Western Sydney University and graduated in 1992. In 1993, she was appointed the Marketing Manager of the Canterbury Bankstown Bulldogs Rugby League Club. She held this position for four years. In 1997, she moved to Melbourne when her husband Chris Anderson was appointed Head Coach of Melbourne Storm. In 1997, she established S-COMM Australia and in 2007 sold it to Repucom. From 2007 to 2014, she was Managing Director for Repucom - Australia and New Zealand.

In August 2015, Anderson was appointed the Australian Paralympic Committee's Chief Executive Officer. In December 2019, she won the Australian Institute of Sport Leadership Award. During 2019, Anderson was instrumental in lobbying for a AUD$8 million investment from the Australian Government for Tokyo 2020 Paralympics, AUD $4million from the Australian Government for the construction of a community, education and events centre at Paralympics Australia's base in Tullamarine, Victoria and launching a new brand for the organisation - Paralympics Australia. In addition, Paralympics Australia signed a landmark media rights deal with Seven West Media to exclusively screen and stream the Paralympic Games and the 2019 World Championships for Para-athletics and Para-swimming.

In February 2018, Anderson's ticket in Canterbury Bankstown Bulldogs Board elections resulted in her being elected Chair.

Anderson has been a member of boards that include - Gold Coast Titans NRL Club, Australian International Military Group, Parramatta Stadium Trust, 2002 Melbourne World Masters Games, Camp Quality and Museum of Applied Arts and Sciences.

In July 2021, Anderson announced her intention to step down from the role as CEO of Paralympics Australia on 31 December 2021.

== Recognition ==
- 2019 - Leadership at the Australian Institute of Sport (AIS) Sport Performance Awards.
- 2019 - Women’s Health Award for Person of Sporting Influence
