= Ben Anderson (rugby league) =

Australian rugby league footballer (born 1978)

Personal information
- Born: 3 February 1978 (age 48) Sydney, New South Wales, Australia

Playing information
- Height: 177 cm (5 ft 10 in)
- Weight: 83 kg (13 st 1 lb)
- Position: Five-eighth
Club
Years	Team	Pld	T	G	FG	P
1998–99	Melbourne Storm	17	1	0	0	4
- Father: Chris Anderson
- Relatives: Jarrad Anderson (brother); Peter Moore (grandfather); Steve Folkes (uncle); Kevin Moore (uncle)

Ben Anderson (born 3 February 1978) is an Australian former professional rugby league footballer who played in the 1990s and coached in the 2000s. He played for the Melbourne Storm from 1998 to 1999. He is the son of Chris Anderson.

== Early life ==
Anderson played junior rugby league for Chipping Norton Kangaroos and was educated at De LaSalle Bankstown. In 1997, Anderson played for the Canterbury-Bankstown Bulldogs in the under 19s before signing a two-year contract with Melbourne.

== Playing career ==
He made his NRL debut in round 4 of the 1998 NRL season, starting from the interchange in Melbourne Storm's first game at Olympic Park. He made four appearances in total that season. However, he spent most of the 1998 season playing with Melbourne's feeder team, the Norths Devils, before requiring a knee reconstruction.

In the 1999 NRL season, Anderson played a further 13 games, starting at five-eighth. However, he was dropped by his father Chris Anderson, who was the coach, following Melbourne's defeat in the qualifying final against the St. George Illawarra Dragons. This turned out to be his final game for Melbourne as he was released by the club in October 1999.

Moving to Sydney, Anderson's rugby league career was in limbo, injuring his knee again playing in a trial match for Metropolitan Cup club Cabramatta Two Blues.

In 2002, Anderson was a member of the Sydney Bulls team that won the Metropolitan Cup, playing at five-eighth in the Bulls 44–12 win. He would later switch to rugby union in late 2004.

== Coaching career ==
Anderson began coaching in 2006 as under-18s coach for the Sydney Bulls.

He would coach the Moranbah Miners in Mackay from 2007, and while coaching Moranbah, Anderson recommended Ben Barba to the Canterbury-Bankstown Bulldogs who subsequently signed him. He would lead the Miners to the 2009 Mercury Cup grand final, only to see his team lose 37–34 against Souths Sharks.

Moving to Brisbane ahead of the 2010 season, Anderson would join up with the Tweed Heads Seagulls as head coach of the club in the Queensland Cup competition. Anderson would coach the club for three seasons, leading the Seagulls to the minor premiership in 2011 in a season where the club's first loss of the season came in the final round of the competition. The club was undefeated in 21 matches, going on a 13-match winning streak from the start of the season before a 10-all draw in round 14 against the Mackay Cutters.

Tweed Heads would lose the 2011 Queensland Cup grand final 16–10 to the Wynnum Manly Seagulls after losing their major semi-final against the same team in the lead-up to the grand final. Anderson was awarded the Queensland Cup coach of the year award in 2011.

Anderson would move on from Tweed Heads at the end of the 2012 Queensland Cup season, returning to Sydney after three seasons with the Seagulls.

For two seasons, Anderson was an assistant coach for the Canterbury-Bankstown Bulldogs at NSW Cup level, before he was appointed coach of the club's NRL Under-20s team in 2016.

Ben Anderson – coaching results by season (major competitions)
Year	Team	Games	Wins	Draws	Losses	Win %	Notes
2010	Tweed Heads Seagulls	22	8	1	13	36%	Finished ninth
2011	Tweed Heads Seagulls	25	21	1	3	84%	Won minor premiership, lost grand final against Wynnum Manly Seagulls
2012	Tweed Heads Seagulls	25	15	1	9	60%	Finished third, lost preliminary final against Wynnum Manly Seagulls
2016	Canterbury-Bankstown Bulldogs (U20s)	24	9	1	14	38%	Finished 11th
Career		96	53	4	39	55%	
