= George Mills =

George Mills may refer to:

- George Mills (footballer) (1908–1970), English footballer
- George Mills (RAF officer) (1902–1971), British Air Chief Marshal
- George Mills (novel), a 1982 novel by American author Stanley Elkin
- George Mills (cricketer, born 1793) (1793–1865), English cricketer
- George Mills (cricketer, born 1867) (1867–1942), New Zealand cricketer
- George Mills (cricketer, born 1916) (1916–1979), New Zealand cricketer
- George Mills (cricketer, born 1923) (1923–1983), English cricketer
- George Hamilton Mills (1827–1901), mayor of Hamilton, Ontario
- George Pilkington Mills (1867–1945), English racing cyclist
- George Mills (politician) (1876–1948), member of the Legislative Assembly of Alberta, 1920–1926
- George Mills (writer) (1896–1972), children's author and schoolmaster
- George D. Mills (1898–1948), American lawyer and politician
- George S. Mills (1866–?), American architect
- George William Mills (1876–1933), British politician
- George Mills (artist) (1792–1824), British sculptor, engraver and medallist
- George Mills (shipbuilder) (1808–1881), Scottish shipbuilder, journalist and novelist
- George Mills (runner) (born 1999), British champion athlete
