= 2004 NRL Grand Final =

Australian rugby league championship match

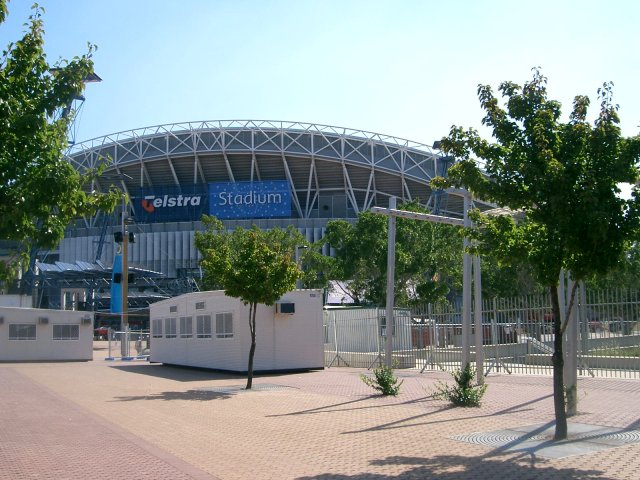
- Telstra Stadium, where the match was played

Sydney Roosters	Canterbury-Bankstown Bulldogs
13	16
	1	2	Total
SYD	13	0	13
CBY	6	10	16
- Date: 3 October 2004
- Stadium: Telstra Stadium
- Location: Sydney, Australia
- Clive Churchill Medal: Willie Mason (CBY)
- National anthem: Katie Noonan
- Referee: Tim Mander
- Attendance: 82,127

Broadcast partners
- Broadcasters: Nine Network
- Commentators: Ray Warren; Peter Sterling; Paul Vautin; Andrew Voss (sideline)

The 2004 NRL Grand Final was the conclusive and premiership-deciding game of the 2004 NRL season. It was contested by the Sydney Roosters, who had finished the regular season in 1st place, and the Canterbury-Bankstown Bulldogs, who had finished the regular season in 2nd place. After both sides eliminated the rest of 2004's top eight teams over the finals series, they faced each other in a grand final for the first time since the 1980 NSWRFL season's decider.

== Background ==
The 2004 NRL season (also known as the 2004 Telstra Premiership due to sponsorship from Telstra) was the 97th season of professional rugby league football in Australia, and the seventh run by the National Rugby League. 15 clubs competed during the regular season before the top 8 finishing teams contested the finals series. For the 2nd consecutive year, the NRL grand final featured two Sydney-based teams with the Canterbury-Bankstown Bulldogs facing the Sydney Roosters.

=== Sydney Roosters ===
The 2004 Sydney Roosters season was the 97th in the club's history. They finished the 2004 regular season in 1st place, taking out the minor premiership. They subsequently won their two finals matches against the Canberra Raiders 38–12 and then the North Queensland Cowboys 19–16 to make their third consecutive grand final and their fourth in five seasons.

=== Canterbury-Bankstown Bulldogs ===
The 2004 Bulldogs RLFC season was the 70th season in the club's history. Coached by Steve Folkes and captained by Steve Price, they finished the regular season 2nd (out of 15). The Bulldogs' goal-kicker Hazem El Masri was the competition's top point scorer. They lost their first match of the finals series against the North Queensland Cowboys 22–30 but won their next two against the Melbourne Storm 43–18 and the Penrith Panthers 30–14 to reach their first grand final since the 1998 NRL Grand Final.

== Teams ==
Luke Ricketson would miss the match through suspension, after he was found guilty and suspended for three matches by the NRL Judiciary in the week leading up to the grand final. Ricketson had been charged with a grade three striking charge in the Roosters preliminary final victory over North Queensland. Roosters centre Justin Hodges was more fortunate than Ricketson, escaping suspension for a suspect tackle in the same match. Teammate Chris Flannery would take his place on the bench for the Roosters against doctor's orders, after being rushed to hospital for surgery on a ruptured testicle suffered in the preliminary final. It was also former Australian captain Brad Fittler's last game of first grade rugby league before retirement.

Regular Bulldogs captain Steve Price was ruled out of the match after injuring his knee in the preliminary final against Penrith. He was replaced as captain by Andrew Ryan.

Team details
Sydney Roosters		Position	Canterbury Bulldogs
Name	Number	Position	Number	Name
Anthony Minichiello	1	Fullback	1	Luke Patten
Shannon Hegarty	2	Wing	2	Hazem El Masri
Ryan Cross	3	Centre	3	Ben Harris
Justin Hodges	4	Centre	4	Willie Tonga
Chris Walker	5	Wing	5	Matt Utai
Brad Fittler (c)	6	Five eighth	6	Braith Anasta
Brett Finch	7	Half back	7	Brent Sherwin
Jason Cayless	8	Prop forward	8	Mark O'Meley
Craig Wing	9	Hooker	9	Adam Perry
Peter Cusack	20	Prop forward	11	Willie Mason
Adrian Morley	10	Second row	12	Andrew Ryan (c)
Michael Crocker	11	Second row	14	Reni Maitua
Craig Fitzgibbon	12	Lock forward	13	Tony Grimaldi
Chad Robinson	14	Interchange	15	Corey Hughes
Chris Flannery	15	Interchange	16	Roy Asotasi
Ned Catic	16	Interchange	17	Sonny Bill Williams
Anthony Tupou	17	Interchange	18	Johnathan Thurston
Ricky Stuart		Coach		Steve Folkes
RLP

== Match details ==
Pre-match entertainment included performances by Chris Isaak and Australian rock band Grinspoon.

=== First half ===
After 13 minutes, Sydney took the first try of the game with Chris Walker scoring the try and Craig Fitzgibbon converting giving Sydney a 6–0 lead. Ten minutes later winger Matt Utai scored the first try for the Bulldogs bringing the score back to 6–4, after Hazem El Masri missing the conversion attempt. A few minutes later El Masri levelled the scores at 6–6 with a penalty goal. Just after the 30 minute mark, Brett Finch kicked a field goal to give Sydney a narrow 7–6 lead. Two minutes later Anthony Tupou made a 30-metre break for Sydney before passing to teammate Anthony Minichiello to cross under the posts with Fitzgibbon converting to give Sydney a 13–6 lead. At the 37th minute, Minichiello looked to have his second try, however the try was denied by the video referee and the Roosters penalised for an obstruction.

=== Second half ===
Two minutes into the second half, Utai got his second try with El Masri converting, bringing the score back to 13–12. In the 53rd minute El Masri crossed over for a try, which was awarded by the video referee despite Roosters players complaints of a double movement. El Masri would narrowly missed the conversion, but his try would give the Bulldogs the lead 16–13. With one minute left and the score remaining at 16–13, Sydney's Michael Crocker made a half break on the Bulldogs 40-meter line, but was tackled by stand in Bulldogs captain Andrew Ryan, resulting in Crocker losing the ball. The desperate tackle from Ryan ending the match to give the Bulldogs their 8th premiership.

This marked the first (and only) time in 2004 that the Roosters lost a match after leading at half-time.

== Match summary ==
2004 NRL Grand Final

Sunday, 3 October
19:00 AEST (UTC+10)

Sydney Roosters	13 – 16	Canterbury-Bankstown Bulldogs
Tries: 2 Walker 14'; Minichiello 35'; Goals: 2 Fitzgibbon 15', 36' (2/2); Field goals: 1 Finch 34'	1st: 13–6; 2nd: 0–10; Report	Tries: 3 Utai 23', 44'; El Masri 53'; Goals: 2 El Masri pen 29', 45' (2/4)

Telstra Stadium, Sydney
Attendance: 82,127
Referee: Tim Mander
Touch judges: Steve Chiddy, Matt Cecchin
Clive Churchill Medal: Willie Mason (Canterbury)

== See also ==
- 2005 World Club Challenge
