= Senator Mills (disambiguation) =

Roger Q. Mills (1832–1911) was a U.S. Senator from 1892 to 1899. Senator Mills may also refer to:

- Edgar G. Mills (1860–?), Wisconsin State Senate
- Elijah H. Mills (1776–1829), Massachusetts
- Fred Mills (politician) (born 1955), Louisiana State Senate
- George D. Mills (1898–1948), Illinois State Senate
- Jack Mills (Nebraska politician) (1937–2019), Nebraska State Senate
- John Mills (Massachusetts politician) (1787–1861), Massachusetts State Senate
- Morris Mills (born 1929), Indiana State Senate
- Ogden L. Mills (1884–1937), New York State Senate
- Peter Mills (American politician) (born 1943), Maine
- Robby Mills (born 1967), Kentucky State Senate
- Roger H. Mills (1813–1881), Connecticut State Senate
- Simeon Mills (1810–1895), Wisconsin State Senate
- Thomas Brooks Mills (1857–1930), Wisconsin State Senate
- William J. Mills (1849–1915), Connecticut State Senate
