= Glen Hughes =

Australian rugby league footballer

Personal information
- Full name: Glen Hughes
- Born: 13 January 1973 (age 53) Sydney, New South Wales, Australia

Playing information
- Height: 184 cm (6 ft 0 in)
- Weight: 95 kg (14 st 13 lb)
- Position: Lock, Five-eighth, Second-row
Club
Years	Team	Pld	T	G	FG	P
1992–04	Canterbury Bulldogs	177	20	0	0	80
- Father: Garry Hughes
- Relatives: Corey Hughes (brother); Steven Hughes (brother); Graeme Hughes (uncle); Mark Hughes (uncle); Peter Moore (great uncle)

Glen Hughes is an Australian former professional rugby league footballer who played in the 1990s and 2000s. He played for Canterbury-Bankstown as a five-eighth and lock, winning the 1995 ARL Premiership with them, also scoring a try in that match.

== Background ==
Hughes is the son of a former Canterbury player, Garry Hughes, and the brother of Steven Hughes and Corey Hughes, who also played for the club.

== Playing career ==
Hughes made his first-grade debut for Canterbury against North Sydney in round 1 1992 at North Sydney Oval. Hughes first three seasons were mainly spent in Canterbury's reserve grade team and he did not play in the club's 1994 grand final loss against the Canberra Raiders.

In the 1995 ARL season, Hughes played 15 games including the 1995 Grand Final victory over Manly-Warringah at the Sydney Football Stadium. The victory was considered a major upset as Canterbury had finished the season in sixth place and Manly were minor premiers.

In the 1998 NRL season, Hughes played 27 games as Canterbury finished 9th on the table and qualified for the finals. Canterbury proceeded to make the 1998 NRL Grand Final after winning 4 sudden-death elimination matches in a row. That includes the club's famous preliminary final victory over rivals Parramatta which is considered to be one of the greatest comebacks of all time. After being 18-2 down with less than 10 minutes remaining, Canterbury scored 3 tries to take the game into extra-time before winning the match 32–20.

Hughes played from the interchange bench for Canterbury in their loss at the 1998 NRL grand final to the Brisbane Broncos. In the 2002 NRL season, Hughes played 17 games as the club went undefeated through most of the year winning their first 16 games. It was then revealed that Canterbury had exceeded the NRL's salary cap by $2 million over 3 years including undisclosed payments made to players. As a result, the NRL fined Canterbury $500,000 and stripped them of all their 37 competition points meaning that the club would finish the 2002 season with the wooden spoon.

Hughes continued to play for Canterbury right until the end of the 2004 NRL season before retiring. He did not play in the club's 2004 NRL Grand Final victory over the Sydney Roosters. Hughes played a total of 271 games for Canterbury across all grades.
