= Noel Hughes =

Personal information
- Born: 6 April 1928; Zetland, Sydney, Australia
- Died: 24 January 2011 (aged 82); Peakhurst, Sydney, Australia
- Batting: Right-handed
- Bowling: Right-arm off-break

Career statistics
Competition	First-class
Matches	21
Runs scored	651
Batting average	25.03
100s/50s	0/1
Top score	95
Balls bowled	642
Wickets	10
Bowling average	31.70
5 wickets in innings	0
10 wickets in match	0
Best bowling	4/19
Catches/stumpings	13/3
- Source: CricketArchive, 6 December 2022

Noel Keith Hughes (6 April 1928 – 24 January 2011) was an Australian-English first-class cricketer who played 21 games, all for Worcestershire, in the 1950s. He was born in Zetland, Sydney.

Hughes played minor cricket for New South Wales Colts, scoring 69 and 60 not out against Queensland Colts in 1951–52, but his first-class debut came in May 1953 when he appeared for Worcestershire against Cambridge University at Fenner's. He played purely as a batsman, as the keeper's spot was taken by George Mills, making one of his two first-class appearances. Hughes made 1 and 15*. His only other first-class outing that season came in June, when he played against Oxford University at Worcester. This time he was behind the stumps, and gained his first stumping when he accounted for Jonathan Fellows-Smith.

Hughes played 19 matches for the county in 1954, and had reasonable success. As well as taking 13 catches and making two stumpings, he hit 566 runs at an average of 23.58. However, though he contributed a number of thirties and forties, he reached his half-century only once, when he scored 95 against Essex at Worcester. He was designated as wicket-keeper in only four of the games he played in 1954, and when not occupied behind the stumps he sent down over 100 overs, claiming ten wickets with his off-spin. He did not play first-class cricket after that season.

His son Graeme Hughes played for New South Wales for a few years in the 1970s, but found more success in rugby league.
