= Corey Hughes =

Australian rugby league footballer

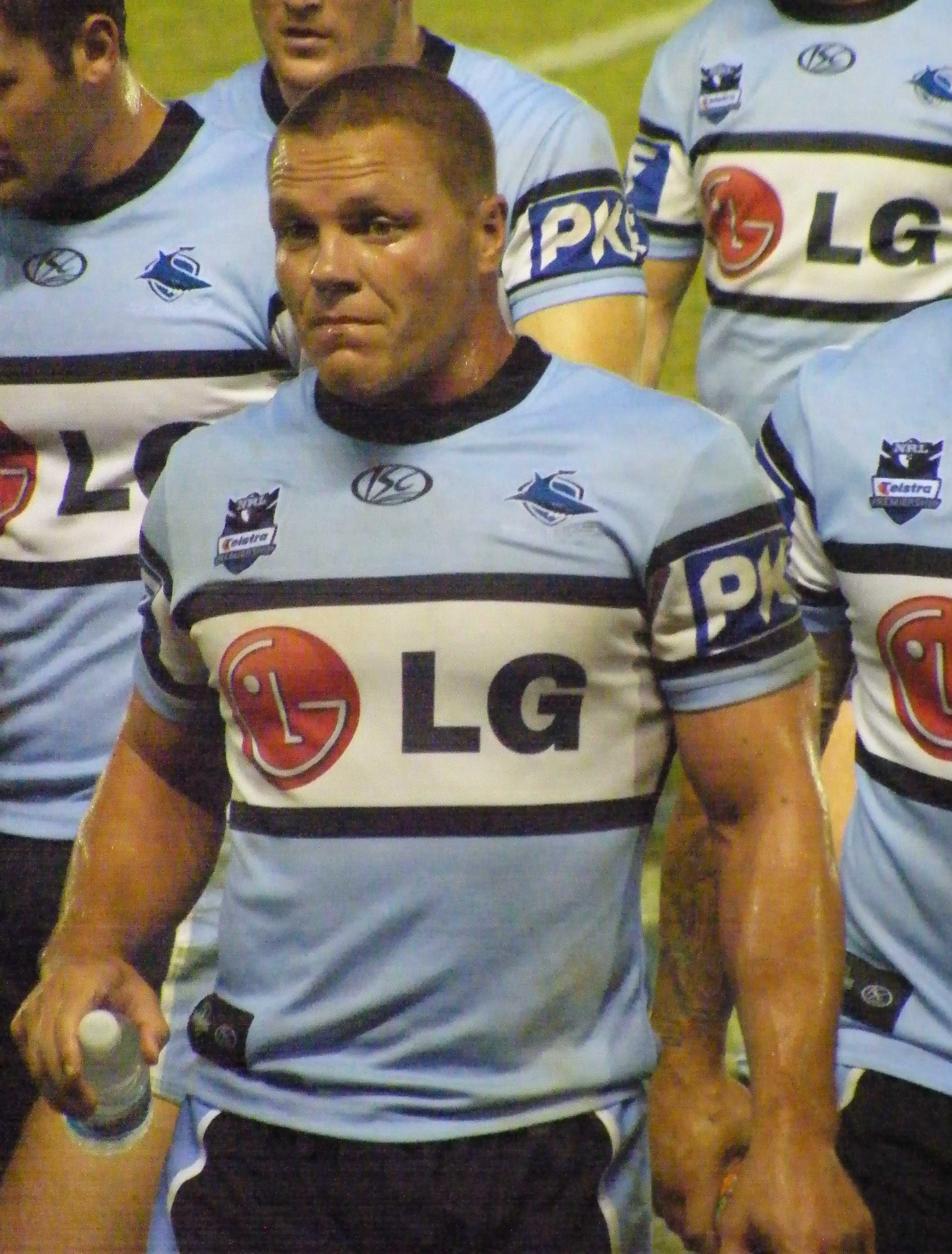
- Hughes playing for the Sharks in 2009

Personal information
- Full name: Corey Hughes
- Born: 17 February 1978 (age 48) Sydney, New South Wales, Australia

Playing information
- Height: 177 cm (5 ft 10 in)
- Weight: 88 kg (13 st 12 lb)
- Position: Hooker
Club
Years	Team	Pld	T	G	FG	P
1998–08	Canterbury Bulldogs	213	28	1	1	115
2009	Cronulla-Sutherland	21	0	0	0	0
	Total	234	28	1	1	115
Representative
Years	Team	Pld	T	G	FG	P
2008	NSW City	1	0	0	0	0
- Father: Garry Hughes
- Relatives: Glen Hughes (brother); Steven Hughes (brother); Graeme Hughes (uncle); Mark Hughes (uncle); Peter Moore (great uncle)

Corey Hughes (born 17 February 1978) is an Australian former professional rugby league footballer who played in the 1990s and 2000s. A City New South Wales representative hooker, he played in the National Rugby League (NRL) for Canterbury-Bankstown and Cronulla-Sutherland Sharks. Corey Hughes is the youngest brother of former Bulldogs players, Glen Hughes and Steven Hughes. He is the son of former Canterbury five-eighth, Garry Hughes.

== Playing career ==
Hughes made his first grade debut for Canterbury in round 8 of the 1998 NRL season against the Adelaide Rams at Belmore Oval, scoring a try during a 30–4 victory.

In the 1998 NRL season, Hughes played 15 games as Canterbury finished 9th on the table and qualified for the finals. Canterbury proceeded to make the 1998 NRL Grand Final after winning 4 sudden death elimination matches in a row including the club's famous preliminary final victory over rivals Parramatta which is considered to be one of the greatest comebacks of all time. After being 18-2 down with less than 10 minutes remaining, Canterbury scored 3 tries to take the game into extra-time before winning the match 32–20.

The following week, Hughes played for Canterbury at five-eighth in their loss at the 1998 NRL grand final to the Brisbane Broncos. In the 2002 NRL season, Hughes played 24 games as the club went undefeated through most of the year winning their first 16 games. It was then revealed that Canterbury had exceeded the NRL's salary cap by $2 million over 3 years including undisclosed payments made to players. As a result, the NRL fined Canterbury $500,000 and stripped them of all their 37 competition points meaning that the club would finish the 2002 season with the wooden spoon.

He played for Canterbury from the interchange bench in their 2004 NRL Grand Final victory over cross-town rivals, the Sydney Roosters. As 2004 NRL premiers, the Canterbury faced Super League IX champions, the Leeds Rhinos in the 2005 World Club Challenge. Hughes played at half back in the Canterbury's 32–39 loss.

In 2005, Hughes was involved in a brawl at the Kembla Grange Racecourse after being taunted by opposition supporters. He was fined by the Canterbury club but refused to pay it.

Hughes signed a one-year deal with the Cronulla-Sutherland Sharks for 2009 and retired at the end of the year.
