= Phillip Lee (rugby league) =

Australian rugby league footballer

Personal information
- Born: 12 February 1977 (age 48); Brisbane, Queensland, Australia

Playing information
- Height: 180 cm (5 ft 11 in)
- Weight: 92 kg (203 lb; 14 st 7 lb)
- Position: Hooker, Second-row
Club
Years	Team	Pld	T	G	FG	P
1996	Sth. Qld. Crushers	19	1	0	0	4
1997–03	Brisbane Broncos	85	11	0	0	44
	Total	104	12	0	0	48

Phillip Lee (born 12 February 1977 in Brisbane, Queensland) is an Australian former professional rugby league footballer who played in the 1990s and 2000s. He played for the South Queensland Crushers and the Brisbane Broncos, usually in the forwards.

Playing at hooker, Lee scored a try for Brisbane in their victory at the 1998 NRL Grand Final over the Canterbury-Bankstown Bulldogs.

Brisbane won the 2000 NRL Grand Final but Lee did not play. However he did travel to England with the Broncos for the 2001 World Club Challenge, playing at lock in the loss to St Helens R.F.C.
