= Tony Grimaldi =

Australian former professional rugby league footballer

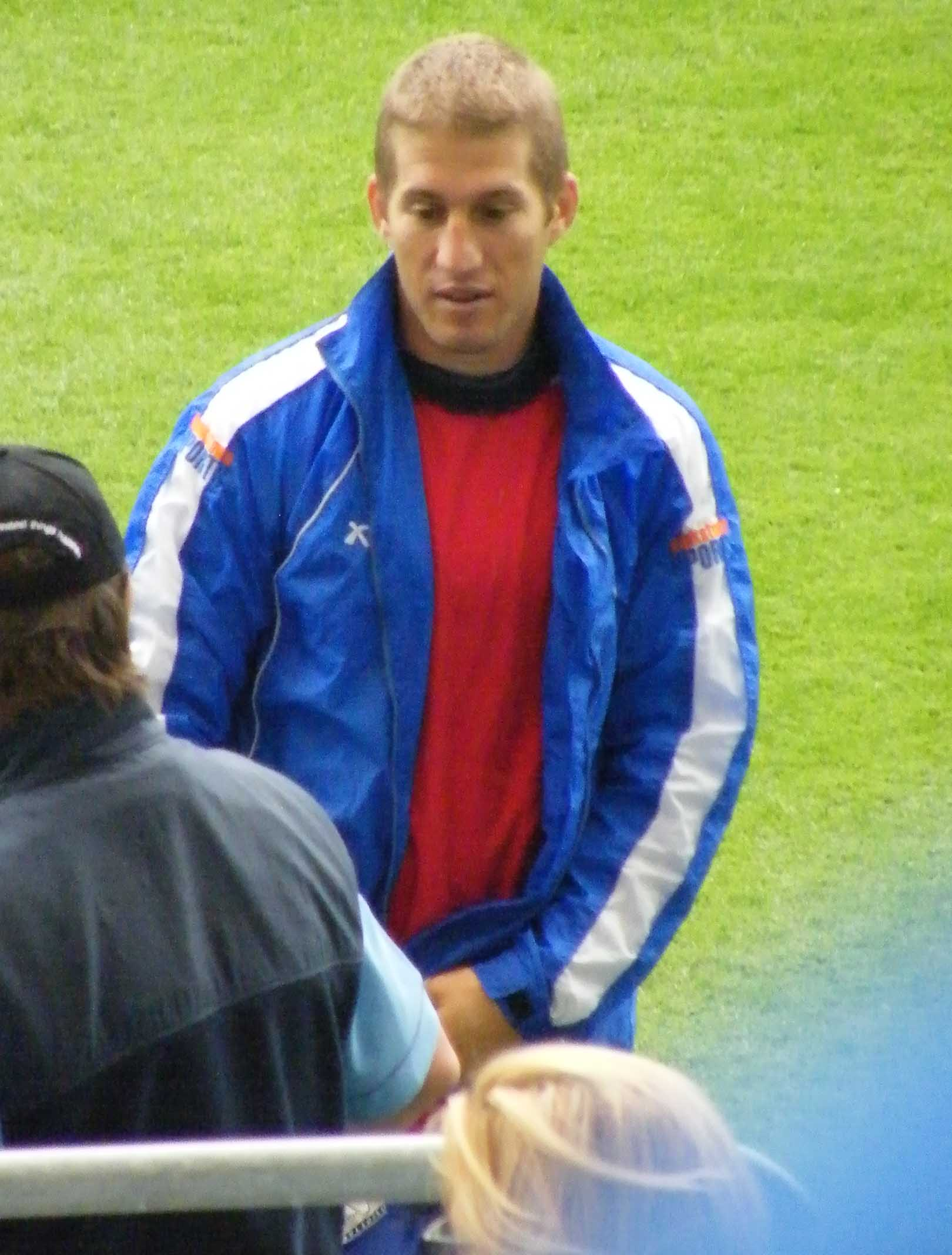

Personal information
- Born: 21 November 1974 (age 51) Sydney, New South Wales, Australia

Playing information
- Height: 184 cm (6 ft 0 in)
- Weight: 93 kg (14 st 9 lb)
- Position: Lock, Second-row, Hooker
Club
Years	Team	Pld	T	G	FG	P
1995	St. George Dragons	1	0	0	0	0
1996–98	Canterbury Bulldogs	23	1	0	0	4
1999	Gateshead Thunder	29	10	0	0	40
2000–01	Hull FC	60	14	0	0	56
2002–06	Canterbury Bulldogs	96	10	0	0	40
	Total	209	35	0	0	140

Tony Grimaldi (born 21 November 1974) is an Australian former professional rugby league footballer who played in the 1990s and 2000s. He played for the Canterbury-Bankstown Bulldogs in the NRL. Grimaldi's career spanned over 12 seasons primarily for Canterbury-Bankstown. He played at second-row forward in the 1998 NRL grand final against the Brisbane Broncos (scoring a try), as well as the 2004 NRL grand final for Canterbury-Bankstown against cross-town rivals, the Sydney Roosters.

== Playing career ==
He played his junior rugby league primarily as a halfback and hooker for Penshurst RSL JRLFC. He played his first game in first grade in Round 21 1995 for the St. George Dragons against the North Queensland Cowboys. The first try he ever scored came after four seasons. It was for Canterbury-Bankstown in the 1998 NRL Grand Final.

Grimaldi also played briefly with Gateshead Thunder and Hull F.C. in the Super League competition. Tony Captained Hull F.C., due to his extensive experience in rugby league, to a final series.

He then returned to the Canterbury-Bankstown Bulldogs in the 2002 season. He was not a regular first-grade player over the 2002–2003 seasons; however, he worked his way back to a starting position.

Grimaldi was criticised for comments made in a press interview regarding Andrew Johns. Grimaldi was quoted as saying "I think you should be able to swear at the touchie if the decision's wrong." He later withdrew his comments attributing them to a "poor attempt at sarcastic humour."

He is remembered as, "One of the club's workhorses, ... rock solid in defence and a sound attacker". In his last season of first grade at almost 32 years of age he still averaged over 40 tackles per game, a major achievement considering the physically demanding nature of rugby. He featured in the premiership-winning side of 2004 for Canterbury-Bankstown. In 2005 despite not making the finals Grimaldi was the NRL top tackler "In 2005 he was the NRL leading tackler with 852 tackles and many will remember his one-on-one steal against Broncos Karmichael Hunt back in round 20 as Canterbury got home with a 29-22 victory."

He captained the side on a number occasions when representative players were unavailable. As 2004 NRL premiers, the Canterbury-Bankstown Bulldogs faced the Super League IX champions, the Leeds Rhinos, in the 2005 World Club Challenge. Grimaldi captained the Bulldogs at lock forward, scoring a try in their 32–39 loss. Grimaldi's loyalty and long-standing service to the club was rewarded with a job within the Canterbury administration.

He is also of Italian descent and was eligible to represent the Italy national rugby league team.

He was forced to announce his retirement from rugby league on 14 September 2006. This was due to a bulging disk in his neck causing extreme pain in his neck and down along his right arm. He had previously had two vertebrae fused exacerbating his injury and increasing the chance of permanently injuring his neck if he continued to play.

== Matches played ==
Team	Matches	Years
St George Dragons	1	1995
Canterbury Bulldogs	120	1996–1998 & 2002–2006
Gateshead Thunder	29	1999
Hull F.C.	60	2000–2001
