= 2011 Queensland Cup =

Rugby League competition

- Duration: March 19 – September 25, 2011
- Teams: 12
- Premiers: Wynnum Manly Seagulls (1st title)
- Minor premiers: Tweed Heads Seagulls (1st title)
- Matches played: 138
- Points scored: 5,889
- Top points scorer: Liam Georgetown (206)
- Player of the year: Javarn White (Courier Mail Medal)
- Top try-scorer: Javarn White (20)

The 2011 Queensland Cup season was the 16th season of Queensland's top-level statewide rugby league competition run by the Queensland Rugby League. The competition, known as the Intrust Super Cup due to sponsorship from Intrust Super, featured 12 teams playing a 25-week-long season (including finals) from March to September.

The Wynnum Manly Seagulls won their first premiership after defeating the Tweed Heads Seagulls 16–10 in the Grand Final at Suncorp Stadium. Norths Devils' fullback Javarn White was named the competition's Player of the Year, winning the Courier Mail Medal.

== Teams ==
In 2011, the lineup of teams remained unchanged for the third consecutive year. The Manly Sea Eagles cut ties with the Sunshine Coast Sea Eagles in November 2010 after they were denied from having feeder clubs in both the Queensland and New South Wales Cup competitions. The Melbourne Storm returned to having an affiliate in the Queensland Cup, forming a partnership with the Easts Tigers.

Colours	Club	Home ground(s)	Head coach(s)	Captain(s)	NRL Affiliate
	Burleigh Bears	Pizzey Park	Paul Bramley	Scott Smith	Gold Coast Titans
	Central Comets	Browne Park	Wayne Barnett	Guy Williams	Brisbane Broncos
	Easts Tigers	Langlands Park	Troy McCarthy	Shane Neumann	Melbourne Storm
	Ipswich Jets	North Ipswich Reserve	Ben & Shane Walker	Keiron Lander	Gold Coast Titans
	Mackay Cutters	Shark Park, Virgin Australia Stadium	Anthony Seibold	Grant Rovelli	North Queensland Cowboys
	Northern Pride	Barlow Park	David Maiden	Ty Williams	North Queensland Cowboys
	Norths Devils	Bishop Park	Trevor Bailey	Mark Vaiao	Brisbane Broncos
	Redcliffe Dolphins	Dolphin Oval	John Dixon	Chris Farrell	Brisbane Broncos
	Souths Logan Magpies	Davies Park	Mark Beaumont	Phil Dennis	Canberra Raiders
	Sunshine Coast Sea Eagles	Stockland Park	Adam Mogg	Wiremu Ratana	None
	Tweed Heads Seagulls	Piggabeen Sports Complex	Ben Anderson	Brad Davis	Gold Coast Titans
	Wynnum Manly Seagulls	BMD Kougari Oval	Paul Green	Luke Dalziel-Don	Brisbane Broncos

== Ladder ==
2011 Queensland Cup
Pos	Team	Pld	W	D	L	PF	PA	PD	Pts
1	Tweed Heads Seagulls	22	20	1	1	578	288	290	41
2	Northern Pride	22	15	2	5	596	373	223	32
3	Souths Logan Magpies	22	15	1	6	555	427	128	31
4	Redcliffe Dolphins	22	14	1	7	514	368	146	29
5	Ipswich Jets	22	11	4	7	560	386	174	26
6	Wynnum Manly Seagulls (P)	22	10	1	11	488	461	27	21
7	Burleigh Bears	22	8	2	12	382	460	-78	18
8	Easts Tigers	22	8	1	13	428	524	-96	17
9	Mackay Cutters	22	8	1	13	369	473	-104	17
10	Norths Devils	22	7	0	15	432	560	-128	14
11	Central Comets	22	7	0	15	425	634	-209	14
12	Sunshine Coast Sea Eagles	22	2	0	20	350	723	-373	4

=== Ladder progression ===
- Numbers highlighted in green indicate that the team finished the round inside the top 6.
- Numbers highlighted in blue indicates the team finished first on the ladder in that round.
- Numbers highlighted in red indicates the team finished last place on the ladder in that round.

	Team	1	2	3	4	5	6	7	8	9	10	11	12	13	14	15	16	17	18	19	20	21	22
1	Tweed Heads Seagulls	2	4	6	8	10	12	14	16	18	20	22	24	26	27	29	31	33	35	37	39	41	41
2	Northern Pride	2	4	6	8	10	11	13	13	15	17	17	17	17	19	20	22	24	26	28	28	30	32
3	Souths Logan Magpies	0	2	4	4	4	6	6	8	8	10	12	12	14	16	18	20	22	24	25	27	29	31
4	Redcliffe Dolphins	2	4	6	8	10	12	12	12	14	14	16	18	20	22	24	24	24	24	25	27	27	29
5	Ipswich Jets	1	2	4	6	6	7	9	11	11	13	14	14	16	16	18	20	20	20	22	22	24	26
6	Wynnum Manly Seagulls	0	0	0	0	0	0	2	4	6	8	9	9	11	11	13	13	15	17	17	19	21	21
7	Burleigh Bears	2	3	3	3	5	7	7	9	9	11	13	15	15	15	16	16	16	16	16	16	16	18
8	Easts Tigers	1	1	1	3	3	3	3	3	5	5	7	9	9	9	9	9	9	9	11	13	15	17
9	Mackay Cutters	2	4	4	4	6	6	6	8	8	8	8	10	12	13	13	15	17	17	17	17	17	17
10	Norths Devils	0	0	2	4	6	6	8	8	8	8	8	8	8	8	8	10	12	14	14	14	14	14
11	Central Comets	0	0	0	0	0	2	4	4	6	6	6	8	8	10	10	10	10	12	14	14	14	14
12	Sunshine Coast Sea Eagles	0	0	0	0	0	0	0	0	0	0	0	0	0	2	2	2	2	2	2	4	4	4

== Regular season ==
The 2011 Queensland Cup regular season featured 22 rounds.

== Finals series ==
Home	Score	Away	Match Information
Home	Score	Away	Date and Time (local)	Venue
Semi-finals
Souths Logan Magpies	20 – 22	Redcliffe Dolphins	10 September 2011, 2:00pm	Brandon Park
Tweed Heads Seagulls	12 – 24	Wynnum Manly Seagulls	10 September 2011, 3:00pm	Piggabeen Sports Complex
Northern Pride	30 – 6	Ipswich Jets	10 September 2011, 5:30pm	Barlow Park
Preliminary Finals
Northern Pride	10 – 26	Tweed Heads Seagulls	17 September 2011, 2:00pm	Dolphin Oval
Redcliffe Dolphins	0 – 36	Wynnum Manly Seagulls	18 September 2011, 2:00pm	Dolphin Oval
Grand Final
Tweed Heads Seagulls	10 – 16	Wynnum Manly Seagulls	25 September 2011, 2:00pm	Suncorp Stadium

Semifinals
1	Tweed Heads Seagulls	12
6	Northern Pride	30
4	Souths Logan Magpies	20
5	Redcliffe Dolphins	22
2	Ipswich Jets	6
3	Wynnum Manly Seagulls	24

Preliminary Finals
1W	Northern Pride	10
1L	Tweed Heads Seagulls	26
2W	Redcliffe Dolphins	0
3W	Wynnum Manly Seagulls	36

Grand Final
Tweed Heads Seagulls	10
Wynnum Manly Seagulls	16

== Grand Final ==
Saturday, 25 September

Tweed Heads Seagulls	10 – 16	Wynnum Manly Seagulls
Tries: Tim Maccan 1 Cody Nelson 1 Goals: Brad Davis 1	1st: 10 - 6; 2nd: 0 - 10; Report	Tries: 1 Jake Granville; 1 Shea Moylan; 1 Matt Seamark; Goals: 2 Matt Seamark

Suncorp Stadium
Attendance: 6,200
Referee: Michael Wise
Player of the Match: Jake Granville (Wynnum Manly)

Tweed Heads Seagulls	Position	Wynnum Manly Seagulls
1. Ryan Milligan	FB	1. Jake Granville
2. Nathanael Barnes	WG	2. Jason Moon
3. James Wood	CE	3. Shea Moylan
4. Matt Hundy	CE	4. Matt Grieve
5. Tom Merritt	WG	5. Sam Te'o
6. Matt King	FE	6. Reece Blayney
7. Brad Davis (c)	HB	7. Matt Seamark
8. Aaron Cannings	PR	8. Dane Carlaw
9. Tim Maccan	HK	9. John Te Reo
10. Josh Starling	PR	10. Mitchell Dodds
11. Ryan Simpkins	SR	11. Tim Natusch
12. Selasi Berdie	SR	12. Kurtis Lingwoodock
13. Cody Nelson	LK	13. Luke Dalziel-Don (c)
14. Tom Kingston	Bench	14. Charlie Gubb
15. Rod Griffin	Bench	15. Ben Shea
16. Jake Leary	Bench	16. Jon Grieve
17. Brock Hunter	Bench	17. Chris Birch
Ben Anderson	Coach	Paul Green

Tweed Heads were near unbeatable during the regular season, losing only 1 game and finishing 9 points clear of their nearest rivals to claim the minor premiership. Wynnum Manly started the season with six straight losses before finally entering the Top 6 in Round 18 and holding on to finish in 6th place and claiming the last spot in the finals series. Prior to the Grand Final the two sides had met each other three times during the 2011 season with Tweed defeating Wynnum Manly by 20 points in Round 5 and 40 points in Round 16, however Wynnum Manly did defeat Tweed Heads 24-12 in the semi-finals.

=== First half ===
Tweed Heads were first on the board, crossing through hooker Tim Maccan, who pushed off four defenders to plant the ball in the corner. Brad Davis was the architect of the second try, selling the dummy to the Wynnum Manly defence and drawing the fullback before putting Cody Nelson over the line. Following an error by Tweed deep in their own half, Wynnum Manly took advantage, with halfback Matt Seamark putting through an inch-perfect grubber for fullback Jake Granville to score under the posts and cut the deficit to 10-6 at the break.

=== Second half ===
The second half saw Wynnum Manly take the lead in the 47th minute, when Seamark dived on a kick from Reece Blayney in the in-goal area to score. Wynnum Manly wrapped up the game in the 73rd minute when Shea Moylan crossed in the left-hand corner after a line break from Blayney. Wynnum Manly won their first ever Queensland Cup premiership, becoming the lowest ranked team (6th) to win the Grand Final. The win would be the first of back-to-back premierships for head coach Paul Green and his side.

Wynnum Manly fullback Jake Granville was awarded the Duncan Hall Medal.

== Player statistics ==
The following statistics are correct as of the conclusion of Round 22.

=== Leading try scorers ===
Pos	Player	Team	Tries
1	Javarn White	Norths Devils	20
2	Nathanael Barnes	Tweed Heads Seagulls	19
3	Luke Capewell	Ipswich Jets	18
4	Brett Anderson	Northern Pride	15
4	Liam Georgetown	Redcliffe Dolphins	15
4	Drury Low	Souths Logan Magpies	15
7	Hughie Stanley	Sunshine Coast Sea Eagles	14
7	Kevin Stephensen	Easts Tigers	14

=== Leading point scorers ===
Pos	Player	Team	T	G	FG	Pts
1	Liam Georgetown	Redcliffe Dolphins	15	73	-	206
2	Chey Bird	Northern Pride	4	91	-	198
3	Brad Davis	Tweed Heads Seagulls	1	74	4	156
4	Brendon Lindsay	Ipswich Jets	2	52	-	112
5	Nat Bowman	Central Comets	3	46	2	106
6	Michael Picker	Souths Logan Magpies	6	40	1	105
7	Liam Taylor	Mackay Cutters	2	48	-	104
8	Hughie Stanley	Sunshine Coast Sea Eagles	14	16	-	88

== End-of-season awards ==
- Courier Mail Medal (Best and Fairest): Javarn White ( Norths Devils)
- QANTAS Player of the Year (Coaches Award): Jake Granville ( Wynnum Manly Seagulls)
- Coach of the Year: Ben Anderson ( Tweed Heads Seagulls)
- Rookie of the Year: Josh Starling ( Tweed Heads Seagulls)
- Representative Player of the Year: Luke Capewell ( Queensland Residents, Ipswich Jets)

== See also ==
- Queensland Cup
- Queensland Rugby League
