= Steven Hughes (rugby league) =

Australian rugby league footballer

Personal information
- Full name: Steven Hughes
- Born: 26 March 1974 (age 51)

Playing information
- Position: Centre
Club
| Years | Team | Pld | T | G | FG | P |
|---|---|---|---|---|---|---|
| 1993–01 | Canterbury Bulldogs | 70 | 29 | 0 | 0 | 116 |
- Father: Garry Hughes
- Relatives: Corey Hughes (brother); Glen Hughes (brother); Graeme Hughes (uncle); Mark Hughes (uncle); Peter Moore (great uncle)

Steven Hughes (born 26 March 1974) is an Australian former professional rugby league footballer who played for the Canterbury-Bankstown Bulldogs in the National Rugby League.

== Background ==
Hughes is the son of former Canterbury five-eighth Garry Hughes. Both his elder brother, Glen Hughes, and younger brother, Corey Hughes, also played for the club.

== Playing career ==
Hughes made his first-grade debut for Canterbury against the Brisbane Broncos in Round 17 of 1993 at the Queensland Sport and Athletics Centre. He played at centre in Canterbury's 1994 grand final loss to the Canberra Raiders at the Sydney Football Stadium. Hughes missed the entire 1995 ARL season due a knee injury. Canterbury would go on to win their 7th premiership that year defeating Manly-Warringah in the grand final.

Hughes then missed the entire 1997 season with a similar injury. In 1998, Hughes played in Canterbury's reserve grade premiership winning side. He had an injury-plagued career in the NRL, amassing 70 first-grade games in nine seasons. He retired at the conclusion of the 2001 NRL season having made a total of 185 appearances for Canterbury across all grades.
