= Brett Oliver =

Australian rugby league footballer

Personal information
- Born: 1 March 1983 (age 42); Sydney, Australia

Playing information
- Position: Halfback, Hooker
Club
Years	Team	Pld	T	G	FG	P
2003–05	Canterbury-Bankstown	6	1	0	0	4

Brett Oliver (born 1 March 1983) is an Australian former professional rugby league footballer who played for the Bulldogs in the National Rugby League. Oliver played as a halfback and hooker.

== Playing career ==
Oliver, a St George junior, was a member of the winning Canterbury reserves premiership team in 2002 and made his first-grade debut the following season. Oliver made three appearances in the club's 2004 NRL premiership winning campaign and travelled to England in 2005 for the World Club Challenge against Leeds.

In total, Oliver played 78 games across all grades for Canterbury scoring 38 tries. After 6 seasons at Canterbury, Oliver joined Western Suburbs in 2006 playing one season before retiring.
