= Gavin Lester =

Australian rugby league footballer

Personal information
- Full name: Gavin Lester
- Born: 5 January 1977 (age 48) Sydney, Australia

Playing information
- Position: Wing
Club
Years	Team	Pld	T	G	FG	P
1998–02	Canterbury Bulldogs	40	13	0	0	52
2004	Sydney Roosters	10	3	0	0	12
	Total	50	16	0	0	64
- Source: As of 17 January 2019

Gavin Lester (born 5 January 1977) is an Australian former professional rugby league footballer who played in the 1990s and 2000s. He played for the Canterbury-Bankstown Bulldogs and the Sydney Roosters, as a wing.

== Background ==
Lester was born in Sydney. He played his junior rugby league with La Perouse United.

== Playing career ==
He began his career in 1998 with the Canterbury-Bankstown Bulldogs on the bench, in Canterbury's 24–10 loss against the Balmain Tigers in Round 4 at Belmore Oval in which he scored a try.

Lester played 22 games as Canterbury finished 9th on the table and qualified for the finals. Canterbury proceeded to make the 1998 NRL Grand Final after winning 4 sudden death elimination matches in a row including the club's famous preliminary final victory over rivals Parramatta which is considered to be one of the greatest comebacks of all time. After being 18–2 down with less than 10 minutes remaining, Canterbury scored 3 tries to take the game into extra-time before winning the match 32–20.

The following week, Lester played on the wing in the 1998 NRL grand final for Canterbury in the 38–12 loss to the Brisbane Broncos at the Sydney Football Stadium.

Lester joined with Sydney Roosters for the 2004 NRL season. Playing 10 matches and scoring 3 tries.
