= Graeme Hughes =

Australian sportsman turned broadcaster (born 1955)

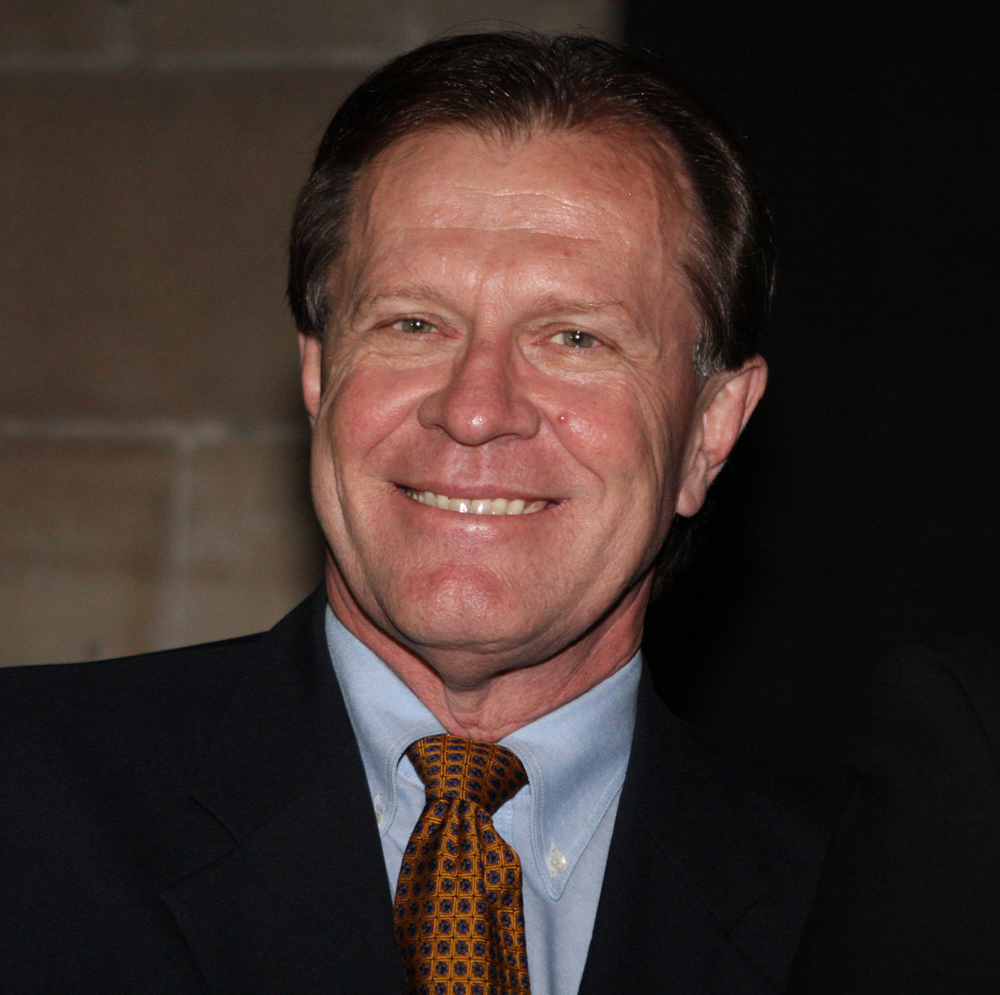
- Hughes in 2013

Personal information
- Full name: Graeme Christopher Hughes
- Born: 6 December 1955 (age 70); Stanmore, New South Wales, Australia
- Batting: Left-handed
- Relatives: Noel Hughes (father)

Domestic team information
- Years: Team
- 1975/76–1978/79: New South Wales

Career statistics
Competition	First-class	List A
Matches	20	2
Runs scored	604	22
Batting average	22.37	11.00
100s/50s	0/3	0/0
Top score	65	14
Catches/stumpings	19/–	1/–
- Source: CricketArchive, 2 February 2010
- Rugby league career

Playing information
- Position: Second-row
Club
Years	Team	Pld	T	G	FG	P
1974–82	Canterbury Bulldogs	116	16	38	0	124
Representative
Years	Team	Pld	T	G	FG	P
1975	New South Wales	1	0	0	0	0

Graeme Christopher Hughes (born 6 December 1955) is an Australian sportsman turned broadcaster. He is the last man to have played both rugby league and cricket for New South Wales. His father Noel Hughes played cricket for Worcestershire in the 1950s.

== Background ==
Hughes was born in Stanmore, New South Wales, Australia.

== Rugby league career ==
As a sportsman, Hughes found most success in rugby league, playing for the Canterbury-Bankstown Bulldogs as well as representing his state at the age of 19. Hughes was unlucky not to be selected for the Australian side to go on the 1978 Kangaroo tour. He was a key member of the Bulldogs "Entertainers" era playing second-row in the Grand Final loss against St George and starred the following year in Canterbury's 18–4 victory against Easts in 1980. Hughes retired in 1982 after a series of injuries to focus on his media career.

In 2008, Hughes announced he was running for a position on the Bulldogs Rugby League Football Club Board of Directors alongside former players Andrew Farrar, Paul Dunn and Barry Ward. Hughes missed out by 32 votes.

His brothers Mark and Garry played for Canterbury, as did his cousin Kevin Moore and nephews Glen, Steven and Corey. His uncle is former rugby league administrator Peter 'Bullfrog' Moore.

== Cricket career ==
Hughes appeared in 20 first-class and three List A games, all for New South Wales between the 1975–76 and 1978–79 seasons. He never produced a spectacular batting performance, his top score being the 65 he hit against Victoria at the MCG in his final season.

== Broadcasting career ==
After his retirement from playing, Hughes moved into the media. He worked on Channel 10's rugby league coverage first being a sideline eye then became the networks play by play caller in 1988 alongside Ian Maurice and Rex Mossop until the end of 1991 when Ten lost the rights to Channel 9.

He also led Ten's commentary team for the English leg of the 1990 Kangaroo tour alongside David Morrow, including all three Ashes tests between Australia and Great Britain (the ABC covered the two tests against France). He also had a stint as Channel 7 commentator for Australian Tests in 1992–93 against Great Britain and New Zealand, before moving to New Zealand to call the Auckland Warriors matches in 1995 for Sky NZ, He hosted Ten Network's coverage of the Seoul Olympics. He also hosted Rugby League programs on Channel 7 as well as appearing on former weekend sports show Sportswatch. Hughes now co-hosts the Talkin' Sport radio show on Sydney station 2SM.

On 31 July 2016, Hughes commentated the Manly Warringah Sea Eagles against Newcastle Knights game for the NRL's retro round on Fox Sports Australia. The following year, Hughes returned to commentate the NRL's retro round game between South Sydney and St. George Illawarra at the Sydney Cricket Ground.
