= Garry Hughes (rugby league) =

Australian rugby league footballer

Personal information
- Full name: Garry Michael Hughes
- Born: 29 October 1952 (age 74) Sydney, New South Wales, Australia

Playing information
- Position: Stand-off, Loose forward
Club
Years	Team	Pld	T	G	FG	P
1974–84	Canterbury-Bankstown	159	14	19	1	81
- Relatives: Corey Hughes (son); Glen Hughes (son); Steven Hughes (son); Graeme Hughes (brother); Mark Hughes (brother); Peter Moore (uncle); Kevin Moore (cousin)

Garry Hughes (born 29 October 1952) is an Australian former professional rugby league footballer who played in the 1970s and 1980s. He played for the Canterbury-Bankstown Bulldogs.

He is the brother of Graeme Hughes and Mark Hughes. They played together in Canterbury's 1980 premiership side.

His sons Glen, Corey and Steven also played for the club.

After retirement he worked for the Bulldogs as football manager. He was sacked from this job in 2004 following an incident at Coffs Harbour.
