= Jarrad Anderson =

Australian rugby league footballer (born 1980)

Personal information
- Born: 7 March 1980 (age 45); Greenacre, New South Wales, Australia

Playing information
- Position: Centre, Wing
Club
| Years | Team | Pld | T | G | FG | P |
|---|---|---|---|---|---|---|
| 2003 | Cronulla Sharks | 14 | 6 | 35 | 0 | 94 |
- Father: Chris Anderson
- Relatives: Ben Anderson (brother)

Jarrad Anderson (born 7 March 1980) is an Australian former professional rugby league footballer who played for the Cronulla-Sutherland Sharks in the NRL.

Anderson, who played his junior football at Canterbury, spent his early career in Queensland at Brisbane Norths, which were a feeder club to the Melbourne Storm. His elder brother, Ben Anderson, played first-grade for Melbourne.

Recruited to Cronulla from NSW First Division side Western Suburbs, Anderson made his NRL debut in round 13 of the 2003 NRL season. The club at the time was coached by his father, former Canterbury player Chris Anderson. He remained in the team for the remainder of the season, initially playing as a centre, before switching to the wing. Having taken over goal-kicking duties from Brett Kimmorley, Anderson finished the season as Cronulla's top point-scorer.

In 2004 he left Cronulla for the Canterbury-Bankstown Bulldogs. The decision by Cronulla officials not to offer Anderson a contract for the 2004 season caused a rift between his father and the club.
