= Alan Wellington =

Australian rugby league footballer

Alf Wellington
Personal information
- Full name: Alfred Francis Wellington
- Born: 29 November 1913 Brunswick, Victoria, Australia
- Died: 11 April 1993 (aged 79) Sydney, New South Wales, Australia

Playing information
- Position: Prop, Second-row
Club
Years	Team	Pld	T	G	FG	P
1935	Canterbury-Bankstown	2	0	0	0	0
1938–40	Newtown	12	1	0	0	3
	Total	14	1	0	0	3
- Source: As of 21 February 2019

Alf Wellington (1913−1993) nicknamed "Duke" was an Australian rugby league footballer who played in the 1930s and 1940s. Wellington played for Canterbury-Bankstown and Newtown. Wellington was a foundation player for Canterbury-Bankstown.

== Playing career ==
Wellington played for the club in their first ever game against North Sydney at North Sydney Oval which finished in a 20–5 loss on April 25, 1935. The match was also Wellington's first grade debut. Wellington went on to play 1 further game for Canterbury which was a 37–9 loss against South Sydney at Marrickville Oval.

Canterbury-Bankstown finished the 1935 season in second last position narrowly avoiding the wooden spoon which was handed to University.

In 1938, Wellington joined Newtown and played 12 games for the club over 3 seasons before retiring.
