= Mark Hughes (rugby league, born 1954) =

English rugby league footballer

Personal information
- Full name: Mark Stephen Hughes
- Born: 6 August 1954 (age 71) Worcester, Worcestershire, England

Playing information
- Position: Centre, Five-eighth, Lock
Club
Years	Team	Pld	T	G	FG	P
1974–83	Canterbury-Bankstown	174	30	22	4	139
- Relatives: Garry Hughes (brother); Graeme Hughes (brother); Corey Hughes (nephew); Glen Hughes (nephew); Steven Hughes (nephew); Peter Moore (uncle)

Mark Stephen Hughes (born 6 August 1954) is an English-born Australian former professional rugby league footballer who played for Canterbury-Bankstown in the 1970s and 1980s. He mostly played lock, but he also spent time playing centre and five-eighth. He is the brother of Garry Hughes and Graeme Hughes, and the uncle of Corey Hughes, Glen Hughes and Steven Hughes.

== Playing career ==
The second eldest of the Hughes brothers to play with Sydney club Canterbury-Bankstown during the 1970s. He competed with his brother Garry for the top pivotal role before moving to the centres. Hughes played Five-eighth in his sides' 19-4 loss to Eastern Suburbs in the 1974 NSWRFL season's grand final.

He went on to establish a reputation as a fine centre and lock with a good step and swerve. Under the coaching of Ted Glossop, he was a key member of Canterbury's "Entertainers" era playing reserve in the 1979 grand final loss to St. George, but after playing every game in the 1980 season, he was back at lock in Canterbury's historic 1980 premiership win over Eastern Suburbs at the Sydney Cricket Ground. It was Canterbury's first premiership win since 1942.

In 1981, injuries impacted on the team severely and Hughes played five-eighth on several occasions. He captained Canterbury on six occasions, twice in 1981, and four times in 1982. From 1982 onwards, he was primarily at lock, but in 1983, he was injured for a significant period of time. He played only 11 games in the 1983 season. He played his last game that year as a replacement in his sides' 18-4 preliminary final loss to the Parramatta Eels at the Sydney Cricket Ground.

He played 174 games, and scored 30 tries, 22 goals and 4 field goals

== Post playing ==
In 1996, Hughes returned to the club in the role of Development Manager. In 2004, he was nominated for the Berries to Bulldogs 70 Year Team of Champions and is a life member of the club.
