= 2005 World Club Challenge =

Rugby league competition

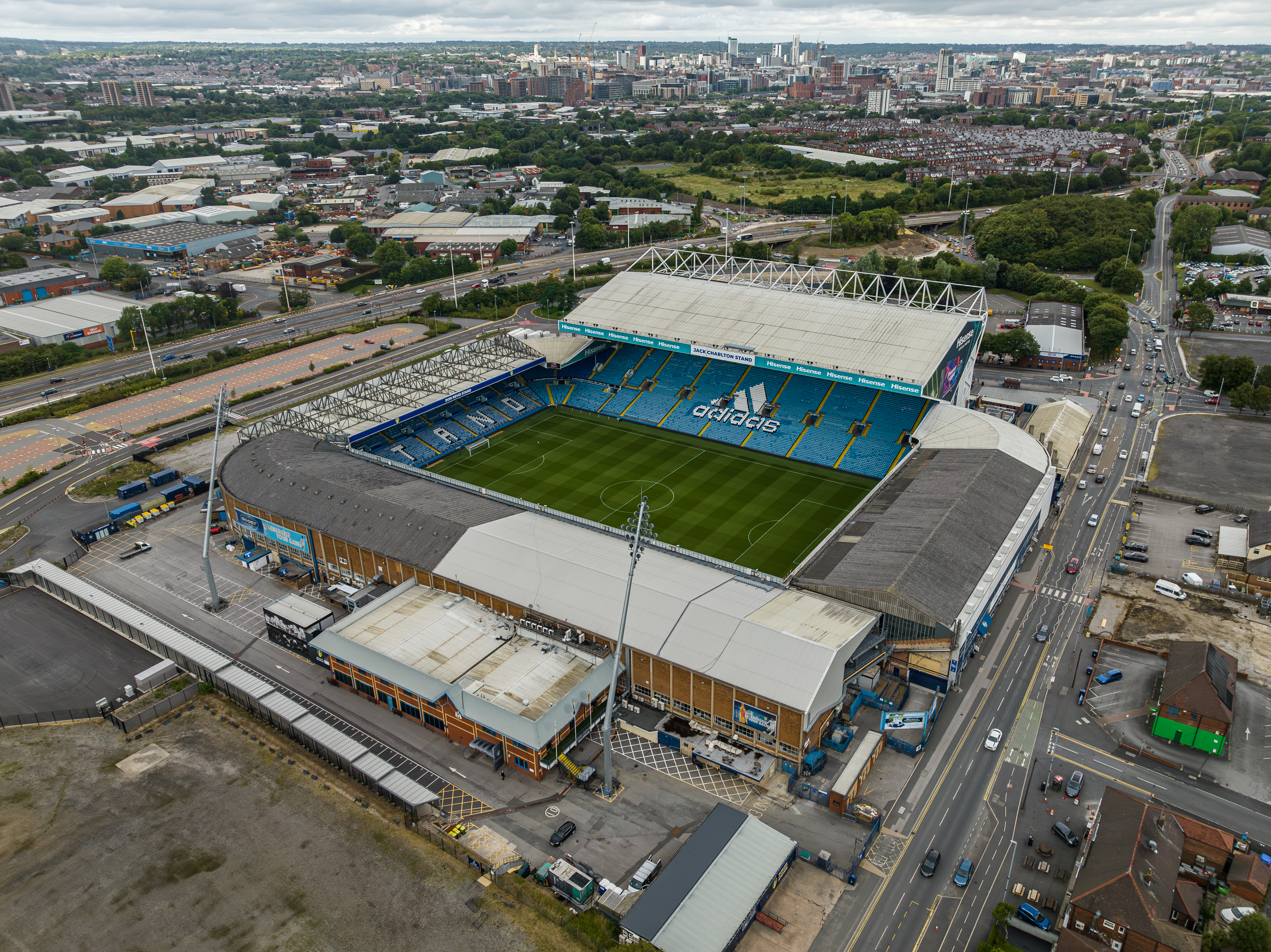
- Elland Road hosted the match
Leeds Rhinos	Bulldogs
(SL)	(NRL)
39	32
	1	2	Total
LEE	26	13	39
BUL	6	26	32
- Date: 4 February 2005
- Stadium: Elland Road
- Location: Leeds, England
- Referee: Sean Hampstead
- Attendance: 37,208

Broadcast partners
- Broadcasters: (United Kingdom) Sky Sports
- Commentators: Eddie Hemmings; Mike Stephenson

The year 2005 Carnegie World Club Challenge was contested by Super League IX champions Leeds Rhinos and 2004 NRL season premiers, the Bulldogs. The match was played on 4 February at Elland Road, Leeds before 37,208 spectators. Australian Sean Hampstead was the referee. The home team came out winners in the end of what was, at the time, the highest-scoring WCC match ever, with a final scoreline of 39–32.

== Qualification ==
=== Leeds Rhinos ===
The 2004 Super League Grand Final was held on Saturday 16 October 2004, at Old Trafford, Manchester, UK. The game was played between Leeds Rhinos, who finished top of the league after the 28 weekly rounds, and Bradford Bulls, who finished second after the weekly rounds.

=== Bulldogs ===
The 2004 NRL Grand Final was the conclusive and premiership-deciding game of the 2004 NRL season. It was contested by the Bulldogs, who had finished the regular season in 2nd place, and the Sydney Roosters, who had finished the regular season in 1st place. After both sides eliminated the rest of 2004's top eight teams over the finals series, they faced each other in a grand final for the first time since the 1980 NSWRFL season's decider.

== Match details ==
The Bulldogs had less than a week to adjust from Sydney summer to Yorkshire winter with four training sessions to prepare whereas the Rhinos had been playing friendlies since Boxing Day. The Sydnesiders were also without six senior players who stayed at home after off-season surgeries.

4 February 2005

Leeds Rhinos	39 - 32	Bulldogs
Tries: Chev Walker; Mark Calderwood; Danny McGuire; Willie Poaching; Rob Burrow; Richie Mathers; Jamie Jones-Buchanan; Goals: Kevin Sinfield (5); Field Goals: Kevin Sinfield		Tries: Hazem El Masri (2); Jamaal Lolesi (2); Luke Patten; Tony Grimaldi Goals: Hazem El Masri (5)

Elland Road, Leeds
Attendance: 37,208
Referee: Sean Hampstead (Australia)

Leeds Rhinos	Position	Bulldogs
1. Richie Mathers	Fullback	1. Luke Patten
2. Mark Calderwood	Winger	5. Trent Cutler
3. Chev Walker	Centre	4. Willie Tonga
4. Keith Senior	Centre	3. Jamaal Lolesi
5. Marcus Bai	Winger	2. Hazem El Masri
13. Kevin Sinfield (c)	Stand Off/Five-Eighth	6. Braith Anasta
6. Danny McGuire	Scrum Half/Halfback	7. Corey Hughes
8. Ryan Bailey	Prop	10. Roy Asotasi
14. Andrew Dunemann	Hooker	9. Adam Perry
15. Danny Ward	Prop	8. Chris Armit
18.Jamie Jones-Buchanan	2nd Row	12. Sonny Bill Williams
12. Chris McKenna	2nd Row	11. Reni Maitua
20. Gareth Ellis	Loose Forward/Lock	13. Tony Grimaldi (C)
7. Rob Burrow	Interchange	15. Ben Czislowski
11. Ali Lauitiiti	Interchange	16. Nate Myles
10. Barrie McDermott	Interchange	Trevor Thurling
16. Willie Poching	Interchange	14. Brett Oliver
Tony Smith	Coach	Steve Folkes

Leeds opened the scoring with their left centre Chev Walker crossing around the five-minute mark. Kevin Sinfield's conversion was successful so the Rhinos were leading 6 - 0.

== Sources ==
- 2005 World Club Challenge at superleague.co.uk
- Rhinos power to world club crown - bbc.co.uk
- Carnegie & Rhinos on top of the world - lmu.ac.uk
- 2005 World Club Challenge at rlphotos.com
- 2005 World Club Challenge at rugbyleagueproject.com
