= Jack Hartwell Sr. =

Australian rugby league footballer

Jack Hartwell
Personal information
- Full name: Jack Hartwell
- Born: 10 June 1902; Parkes, New South Wales, Australia
- Died: 21 January 1970 (aged 67)

Playing information
- Position: Prop, Second-row
Club
Years	Team	Pld	T	G	FG	P
1934	Western Suburbs	2	0	0	0	0
1935–36	Canterbury-Bankstown	21	7	0	0	21
	Total	23	7	0	0	21
- Source: As of 20 February 2019

Jack Hartwell Sr. (1902–1970) was an Australian rugby league footballer who played in the 1930s for Western Suburbs and Canterbury-Bankstown. Hartwell was the father of Jack Hartwell Jnr who played for Canterbury between 1948 and 1951.

== Playing career ==
Hartwell made his first grade debut for Western Suburbs in 1934 playing in 2 games for the club as they finished as minor premiers and eventually won the premiership defeating Eastern Suburbs in the grand final.

In 1935, Hartwell joined newly admitted Canterbury-Bankstown and played in the club first ever game against North Sydney at North Sydney Oval on 25 April 1935. The match ended in a 20–5 defeat with Hartwell scoring the club's first try.

In 1936, Hartwell played 11 games as Canterbury went from finishing second last in 1935 to finishing 2nd and qualifying for their first finals campaign. Hartwell played in the 25–13 loss against Eastern Suburbs. This would be Hartwell's final season in first grade.
