= 1998 NRL Grand Final =

Rugby league match

- Cover of Big League match program

Canterbury-Bankstown Bulldogs	Brisbane Broncos
12	38
	1	2	Total
CBY	12	0	12
BRI	10	28	38
- Date: 27 September 1998
- Stadium: Sydney Football Stadium
- Location: Moore Park, New South Wales
- Clive Churchill Medal: Gorden Tallis (BRI)
- National anthem: Julie Anthony
- Referee: Bill Harrigan
- Attendance: 40,857

Broadcast partners
- Broadcasters: Nine Network
- Commentators: Ken Sutcliffe (host); Ray Warren; Peter Sterling; Paul Vautin; Wally Lewis Laurie Daley & Steve Roach (sideline)

The 1998 NRL Grand Final was the conclusive and premiership-deciding game of the 1998 NRL season. It was the first grand final of the re-unified National Rugby League and featured minor premiers and the previous year's Super League premiers, the Brisbane Broncos against the Canterbury-Bankstown Bulldogs, who had finished the regular season ninth (out of 20) to make a top-ten play-off grouping. It was to be the first grand final under the National Rugby League partnership's administration and the last to be played at the Sydney Football Stadium. It was also the first time these two sides had met in a grand final.

Brisbane scored first but by half time trailed Canterbury 10–12. However, the Brisbane side scored 28 unanswered points in the second half, winning 38–12 and equaling the second highest score for a team in grand final history.

== Background ==
The 1998 NRL season was the 91st season of professional rugby league football in Australia, and the inaugural season of the newly formed National Rugby League (NRL). The 1998 Grand Final's teams had played each other twice during the regular season, the Broncos winning both times. Also having won three of the past six grand finals compared with Canterbury's one meant Brisbane went into the match as unbackable favourites.

=== Canterbury-Bankstown Bulldogs ===
The 1998 Canterbury-Bankstown Bulldogs season was the 64th in the club's history. Coached by Steve Folkes and captained by Darren Britt, they finished the regular season ninth (out of 20) before winning all four of their finals matches to reach the grand final. Canterbury's run through the finals was particularly impressive, coming from behind to defeat the Parramatta Eels in extra time in the grand final qualifier.

=== Brisbane Broncos ===
The 1998 Brisbane Broncos season was the eleventh in the club's history. Coached by Wayne Bennett and captained by Allan Langer, they started the season as defending Super League (Australia) premiers and posted their three biggest-ever wins in Rounds 5, 7 and 15 before finishing the regular season as minor premiers. After losing their first finals match, the Broncos won the next two to qualify for the grand final.

Team	Rd.1	Rd.2	Rd.3	Rd.4	Rd.5	Rd.6	Rd.7	Rd.8	Rd.9	Rd.10	Rd.11	Rd.12	Rd.13	Rd.14	Rd.15	Rd.16	Rd.17	Rd.18	Rd.19	Rd.20	Rd.21	Rd.22	Rd.23	Rd.24	MS	QF	SF	PF
Bulldogs	CAN	BRI	ADE	BAL	PAR	GC	BAL	ADE	NQL	AUK	BRI	MAN	NS	NEW	SYD	CRO	SOU	CAN	PAR	PEN	WS	STG	MEL	ILL	STG	NS	NEW	PAR
Broncos	MAN	CBY	PEN	GC	NQL	MAN	NS	NEW	SYD	CRO	CBY	CAN	PAR	PEN	WS	STG	MEL	ILL	GC	BAL	ADE	NQL	AUK	SOU	Bye	PAR	MEL	SYD
Legend: Win Loss

== Teams ==
Brisbane forward Peter Ryan missed the match for Brisbane through suspension. Ryan had been found guilty and suspended for three matches by the NRL Judiciary for a high tackle in the Broncos' semi final victory against Melbourne.

Team details
Canterbury Bulldogs		Position	Brisbane Broncos
Name	Number	Position	Number	Name
Rod Silva	1	Fullback	1	Darren Lockyer
Gavin Lester	2	Wing	14	Michael De Vere
Shane Marteene	3	Centre	3	Steve Renouf
Willie Talau	4	Centre	4	Darren Smith
Daryl Halligan	5	Wing	5	Wendell Sailor
Corey Hughes	6	Five eighth	6	Kevin Walters
Craig Polla-Mounter	7	Half back	7	Allan Langer (c)
Darren Britt (c)	8	Prop forward	8	Shane Webcke
Jason Hetherington	9	Hooker	9	Phillip Lee
Steve Price	10	Prop forward	10	Andrew Gee
Tony Grimaldi	11	Second row	11	Gorden Tallis
Robert Relf	12	Second row	12	Brad Thorn
Travis Norton	13	Lock forward	13	Tonie Carroll
Steve Reardon	14	Interchange	2	Michael Hancock
Glen Hughes	15	Interchange	15	John Plath
Troy Stone	16	Interchange	16	Kevin Campion
David Thompson	17	Interchange	17	Petero Civoniceva
Steve Folkes		Coach		Wayne Bennett

=== Officials ===
Referee Bill Harrigan was appointed to referee his fifth grand final, with Steve Betts and John McCormack appointed as touch judges. The video referee was Ian Parnaby.

== Pre-match ==
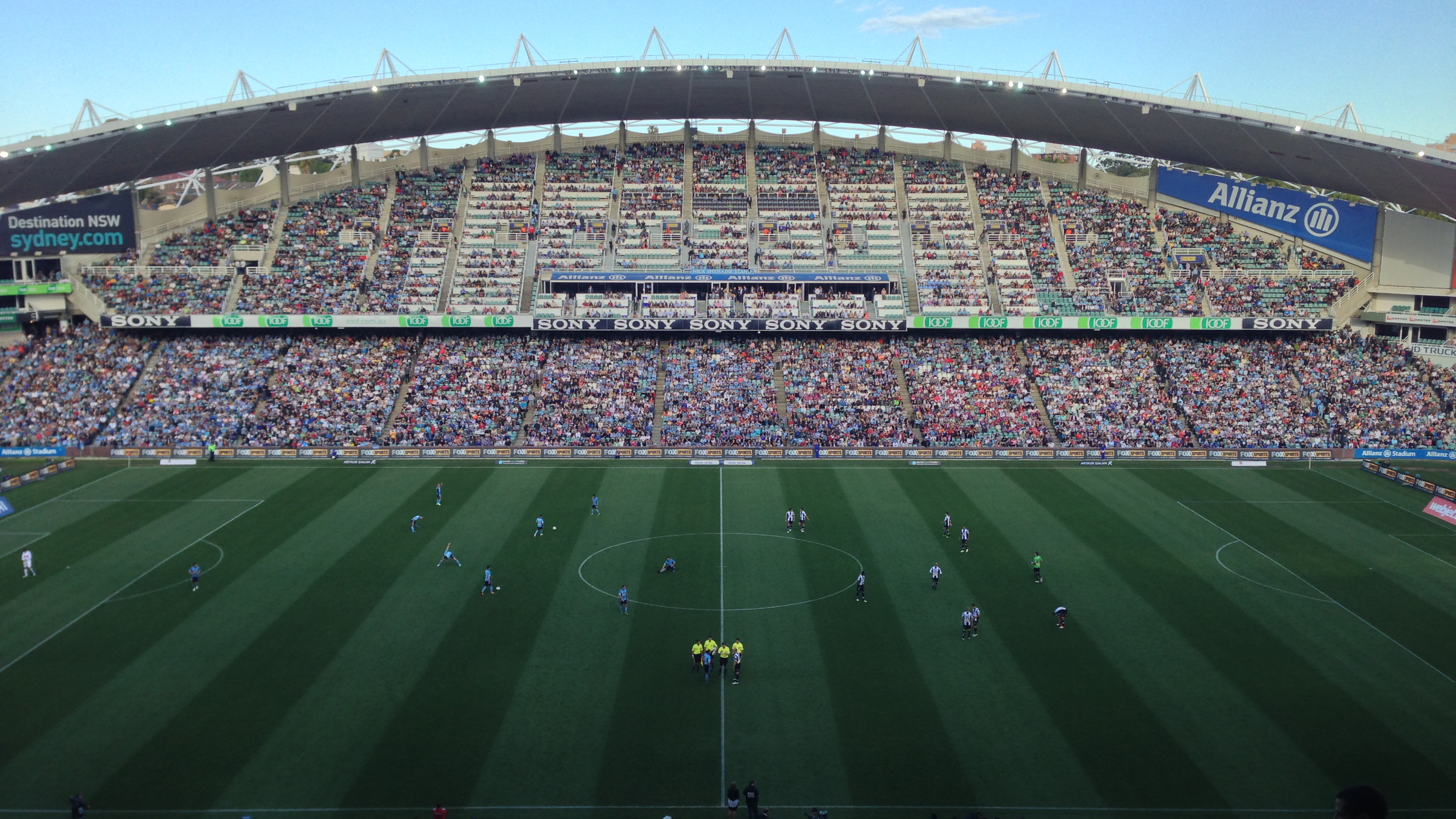
The Sydney Football Stadium, which hosted the match

Australian musician Jimmy Barnes performed the pre-match entertainment with his son, fellow musician David Campbell. Julie Anthony sang Advance Australia Fair as she previously did before the 1987 NSWRL Grand Final.

The curtain raiser match on grand final day, saw Canterbury defeat Parramatta 26–22 in the President's Cup grand final, after falling behind 22–0 inside the opening 30 minutes of the match.

== Match summary ==
With the Canterbury side having last won a premiership in 1995 and the Broncos in 1997, most players in both sides had grand final experience. Despite good weather, the attendance of 40,857 was the lowest seen at the Sydney Football Stadium for a grand final since 1989.

=== First half ===
The Broncos kicked off and in only the third minute of the match, a tackle on Willie Talau twenty metres out from Canterbury's line saw the ball come loose. It was kicked ahead by Brisbane winger and last-minute inclusion (due to Michael Hancock's finger injury) Michael De Vere, who won the chase into the left side of the in-goal where he dived on it for the game's first points. Darren Lockyer converted to give Brisbane a 6-0 lead. A few minutes later the Broncos were denied a try in the same corner when Renouf caught a stray Kevin Walters pass to dive over, with video re-plays showing that the ball only appeared to travel forward because it was struck by a Canterbury defender.

By the eleventh minute, the Canterbury side had made it down to Brisbane's line and got a penalty in front of the goal posts. They opted to go for the kick and Daryl Halligan brought the score back to 6-2. Brisbane withstood further pressure on their line until Tony Grimaldi forced his way over under the posts in the twenty-second minute. Daryl Halligan converted Grimaldi's try to give Canterbury an 8-6 lead. Canterbury prop Troy Stone had to leave the field at this point with a broken arm, but would return ten minutes later with a guard on it to play the rest of the match.

Five minutes later, the Brisbane side had the ball down at the other end of the field and after moving it quickly through the hands from the left hand side of the field out to the right, Kevin Campion forced his way over in the corner. Lockyer's attempted conversion from the sideline missed but the Broncos were back in front 10-8. Canterbury struck back a few minutes later when Steve Price stepped through an opening twenty-five metres out and gave the ball to Willie Talau to dive over on the right side, regaining the lead. Halligan missed his kick so the score was 12-10 in favour of the Canterbury side.

No more points were scored before the break.

=== Second half ===
Less than two minutes into the second half, Brisbane's Tonie Carroll crossed under the posts for Brisbane's third try, with Darren Lockyer converting to give Brisbane back the lead at 16-12. Eight minutes later Brisbane were in the centre of the field when Allan Langer threw a short pass inside to Steve Renouf who raced through into open space. He was tackled on the twenty-metre line but as the Canterbury defence scrambled to get back, the Broncos kept it moving, the ball going out to Wendell Sailor who dived over in the right corner. Lockyer's kick from the sideline missed so Brisbane led 20-12.

In the fifty-seventh minute, Allan Langer put a kick down field and Daryl Halligan picked the ball up in his own in-goal and he made it five metres into the field of play only to be forced back into goal by the Broncos chasers. Shortly after that, Brisbane seemed to have the game wrapped up when Gorden Tallis at dummy-half feigned passing and from close range forced his way over the try line under the posts. With Darren Lockyer converting, this gave Brisbane a 26-12 lead with twenty minutes of the match remaining. The Broncos' next try came in the sixty-ninth minute after getting a penalty down close to Canterbury's line near the left corner, taking the tap and passing it quickly through the hands out to the right side where Phillip Lee, the only Brisbane player to be playing in his first Grand Final, ran through a gap to crash over. Lockyer kicked the extras so Brisbane led 32-12.

In the seventy-fifth minute Brisbane, after playing the ball on their own twenty-metre line, got the ball to Langer who put a charging Tonie Carroll through a gap and into open space. Carroll ran forty metres before passing back in for Darren Smith, bound for Canterbury the following season, to run the remaining thirty-five to the try-line. Lockyer converted so the final score was 38-12.

The Clive Churchill Medal for man-of-the-match was awarded to Gorden Tallis. The victory also kept intact Brisbane's winning record in grand finals with four from four. It was the second time that the Broncos had won back-to-back premierships, having done so in 1992-93 as well.

No World Club Challenge match was played between the 1998 NRL and Super League champions.

=== Scoreboard ===
1998 NRL Grand Final

Sunday, 27 September
15:00 AEST (UTC+10)

Canterbury-Bankstown Bulldogs	12 – 38	Brisbane Broncos
Tries: 2 Grimaldi 21'; Talau 30'; Goals: 2 Halligan pen 11', 22' (2/3)	1st: 12–10; 2nd: 0–28; Report	Tries: 7 De Vere 2'; Campion 27'; Carroll 41'; Sailor 50'; Tallis 59'; Lee 68'; Smith 75'; Goals: 5 Lockyer 4', 43', 60', 69', 76' (5/7)

Sydney Football Stadium, Sydney
Attendance: 40,857
Referee: Bill Harrigan
Touch judges: Steve Betts, John McCormack
Clive Churchill Medal: Gorden Tallis (Brisbane)
