= George D. Mills =

American politician and lawyer

George D. Mills (April 20, 1898–August 20, 1948) was an American politician and lawyer.

Mills was born in Chicago, Illinois. He went to the Chicago public schools. Mills served in the United States Army during World War I and was commissioned a second lieutenant. He received his bachelor's and law degrees from the University of Chicago. Mills was admitted to the Illinois bar in 1923. Mills practiced law in Chicago and served as an Assistant Chicago City Attorney from 1927 to 1930. He also served as a senior hearing officer for the Illinois Department of Finance. Mills was a Republican. Mills served in the Illinois Senate from 1943 until his death in 1948. Mills killed himself with a firearm at a hotel in Chicago, Illinois.
