= Chris Anderson (rugby) =

Australian RL coach & former Australia international rugby league footballer

Personal information
- Full name: Christopher Anderson
- Born: 2 May 1952 (age 74) Condobolin, New South Wales, Australia

Playing information
- Weight: 79 kg (12 st 6 lb)
- Position: Wing
Club
Years	Team	Pld	T	G	FG	P
1971–84	Canterbury-Bankstown	230	94	0	0	303
1974–75	Widnes	19	18	0	0	54
1984	Hull Kingston Rovers	2	0	0	0	0
1984–87	Halifax	92	22	0	0	88
	Total	343	134	0	0	445
Representative
Years	Team	Pld	T	G	FG	P
1975–82	Australia	12	1	0	0	3
1980–83	New South Wales	4	3	0	0	12

Coaching information
Club
Years	Team	Gms	W	D	L	W%
1984–88	Halifax	139	77	10	52	55
1990–97	Canterbury Bulldogs	181	110	4	67	61
1998–01	Melbourne Storm	89	53	2	34	60
2002–03	Cronulla Sharks	51	24	0	27	47
2007	Sydney Roosters	16	5	0	11	31
	Total	476	269	16	191	57
Representative
Years	Team	Gms	W	D	L	W%
1999–03	Australia	25	22	0	3	88

Rugby union career
Coaching career
- Years: Team
- 2004-05: Dragons
- Relatives: Jarrad Anderson (son); Ben Anderson (son); Peter Moore (father in law); Steve Folkes (brother in law); Kevin Moore (brother in law)

Christopher Anderson (born 2 May 1952) is an Australian former professional rugby league footballer who played in the 1970s and 1980s, and coached in the 1990s and 2000s. An Australian Kangaroos and New South Wales Blues representative winger, he featured in Canterbury-Bankstown's third grand final win and captained Halifax to both League and Cup success.

As a coach, Anderson took Australia to victory in the 2000 World Cup victory and coached both Canterbury-Bankstown and Melbourne Storm to premiership wins. He is also a member of the Halifax Hall of Fame. His nickname was "Opes".

== Playing career ==
Anderson was a wing who was recruited by Peter Moore from Forbes, New South Wales, where he attended Red Bend Catholic College. Anderson gave the club a vital tryscoring power which had been quite absent from Belmore throughout the 1950s and 1960s. In 1974, when Canterbury-Bankstown reached the Grand Final, Anderson scored sixteen tries to surpass the previous club season record of fourteen held jointly by Morrie Murphy in 1947 and Barry Stenhouse in 1953.

During the 1974–75 season, Anderson played in England for Widnes. He played left wing in Widnes’ 2–3 defeat by Bradford Northern in the 1974–75 Player's No.6 Trophy Final at Wilderspool Stadium, Warrington on 25 January 1975. During the 1975 Australian season, Anderson was flown to England to play on the wing for Widnes in their 14–7 victory over Warrington in the 1975 Challenge Cup Final at Wembley Stadium, London on Saturday 10 May 1975.

Anderson surpassed Eddie Burns’ club record for Canterbury-Bankstown of 65 tries in 1979. He represented Australia in eight tests, including the 1975 World Cup and two Kangaroo Tours in 1978 and 1982, although several bouts of glandular fever had severely limited his appearances in the two seasons preceding the latter tour. Anderson also represented New South Wales in the experimental 1980 State of Origin game.In his last representative match in the last Origin encounter of 1983, Anderson became the first ever player to score a hat-trick of tries in a State of Origin match, although the Blues lost 22–43. That season Anderson scored nineteen tries for the Bulldogs, a club record until Nigel Vagana scored twenty-three in 2002.

After struggling with a broken arm during 1984, and being dropped to reserve grade for the latter part of the NSWRL season, Anderson became captain-coach of Halifax between late 1984 and May 1988 where he enjoyed great success, including winning the Championship during the 1985–86 season, and played stand-off in the 19–18 victory over St. Helens in the 1987 Challenge Cup final at Wembley Stadium, London on Saturday 2 May 1987. He played stand-off in almost all his games for Halifax.

== Coaching career ==
Anderson is one of the few people to play and coach competition winning sides in both Australia and England. He is also one of the few people to coach two different clubs to NRL/NSWRL premiership success. Anderson returned to Australia after playing/coaching in the British 1987–88 season and was appointed coach of the Canterbury-Bankstown Bulldogs Under 21s team for the 1989 season. Despite being linked to the North Sydney first grade coaching job after Frank Stanton was not reappointed, Anderson was quickly appointed as Canterbury's first grade coach for 1990. He enjoyed eight fruitful seasons at Canterbury, including the 1995 Premiership triumph over a Manly team that had won its first fifteen games and lost only twice before the Grand Final.

The formation of the Melbourne Storm saw Anderson become their inaugural coach. His son, Ben, played 17 games for Melbourne. Anderson was appointed coach of the Australian national team in March 1999, replacing Wayne Bennett. Then he guided the Storm to Premiership success when they defeated the St. George Illawarra Dragons in the 1999 NRL Grand Final. Anderson was coach of the Australian team to compete in the end of season 1999 Rugby League Tri-Nations tournament. In the final against New Zealand the Kangaroos won 22–20.

After seven rounds (and only two wins) of the 2001 NRL season Anderson quit as Melbourne Storm coach. On the 2001 Kangaroo Tour, when coaching Australia, Anderson, was taken to a Wigan hospital after complaining of chest pains during the first half of the deciding third test match against Great Britain at the JJB Stadium. He had suffered a non-fatal myocardial infarction but made a full recovery.

Anderson was appointed coach of the Cronulla-Sutherland Sharks for two seasons in 2002 and 2003, getting them one game short of the Grand Final in 2002. Anderson was sacked in dramatic circumstances over disagreements with the club's management on the future direction of the team, largely centred on his decision to replace the existing halfback, Preston Campbell with new signing Brett Kimmorley in the starting side. At the end of the 2003 NRL season, he went on the 2003 Kangaroo tour of Great Britain and France, coaching Australia to victory over Great Britain in what would be the last time the two nations contested an Ashes series. After five successful seasons Anderson's tenure as coach of Australia came to a halt following the successful 2003 whitewash of Great Britain.

In July 2004, despite having never previously coached a rugby union team Anderson was appointed coach of the Newport Gwent Dragons for a two-year deal. Despite finishing fourth in the Celtic League that season, his one-year contract was not renewed.

Anderson accepted a two-year contract with the Sydney Roosters as their first grade coach for the 2007 and 2008 NRL seasons. However, Anderson stepped down from the job late into the 2007 season, after eleven losses from sixteen matches, including a horrific 56–0 loss to Manly. He was replaced by former Sydney Roosters five-eighth Brad Fittler.

Anderson currently coaches the Mullumbimby Giants first grade side on the NSW Far North Coast in the NRRRL (Northern Rivers Regional Rugby League) competition.

== Recognition ==
Anderson is a Halifax Hall of Fame Inductee and was awarded the Australian Sports Medal on 24 October 2000 for his contribution to Australian rugby league.
