= George Mills (cricketer, born 1923) =

English cricketer

Personal information
- Full name: George Thomas Mills
- Born: 12 September 1923; Redditch, Worcestershire, England
- Died: 15 September 1983 (aged 60); Bromsgrove, Worcestershire, England
- Batting: Right-handed
- Role: Wicket-keeper

Domestic team information
- Years: Team
- 1953: Worcestershire
- First-class debut: 16 May 1953; Worcestershire v Cambridge University
- Last First-class: 16 June 1953; Worcestershire v Middlesex

Career statistics
Competition	FC
Matches	2
Runs scored	46
Batting average	11.50
100s/50s	0/0
Top score	23
Balls bowled	0
Wickets	0
Bowling average	-
5 wickets in innings	0
10 wickets in match	0
Best bowling	-
Catches/stumpings	5/4
- Source: cricketarchive.com, 13 April 2008

George Thomas Mills (12 September 1923 – 15 September 1983) was an English cricketer who played two first-class matches for Worcestershire in 1953. He claimed four dismissals on debut against Cambridge University at Fenner's in May, and a further five a month later against Middlesex at Worcester, but these two matches proved to be the sum of his first-class career.
