= Peter "Bullfrog" Moore =

Australian rugby league administrator

Peter Sydney "Bullfrog" Moore OAM (Irish: Peadar Sidní Ó Mórdha; 1932 – 5 July 2000) was an Australian rugby league administrator, particularly associated with the Canterbury-Bankstown Bulldogs, where he was Chief Executive from 1969 to 1995, serving a record 26 years at the helm. The Canterbury club won four grand finals during his time as its CEO, and he was largely considered responsible for fostering the proud "family" culture for which the club became renowned.

== Career ==
Moore was from a Roman Catholic family of Irish descent and was a local news agency owner in the Sydney suburb of Belmore before arriving at the Canterbury-Bankstown Berries in 1969. Nicknamed "Bullfrog" due to the amphibious appearance of his head, Moore undertook what was known as the "reformation" of the Canterbury club and shaped the club for the success it was to enjoy throughout the 1980s.

He was famous for his recruitment of players to the Bulldogs and for introducing player scholarships to help young players coming to Sydney with their off-field careers (particularly before the game was fully professional). His first signing for the Bulldogs was New Zealand international Bill Noonan. During his time at Canterbury, the club won five premierships and were runners-up on another four occasions. Canterbury made the finals in 20 years of the 26 years he was there, in a remarkable run of success for a club that had won next to no silverware after initial premierships in 1938 and 1942.Moore was also manager of Australian and New South Wales rugby league representative teams, and a life member of the Canterbury Bulldogs, Canterbury Leagues Club, Australian Rugby League and New South Wales Rugby League. He was the 1978 Kangaroo tour manager.

In 1987, Moore was awarded a Medal of the Order of Australia (OAM) for his services to rugby league and the community.

In 1995, he was handed the keys to the City of Canterbury, New South Wales. Moore had been actively involved in supporting Super League, and in securing the signature of the Canterbury-Bankstown coach (his son-in-law, Chris Anderson) to a Super League contract. Moore offered his resignation from the ARL to Ken Arthurson outside a meeting to discuss the Super League problem on 1 April 1995.

== Personal life ==
A dedicated family man, Moore and his wife Marie had nine children. At the time of his death, he had nineteen grandchildren. A heavy cigarette smoker, Moore died in 2000, aged 68, after a long battle with throat cancer.

The National Rugby League decided that the Dally M Rookie of the Year award would be named in his honour.

== Family Club ==
From the 1970s, Canterbury-Bankstown became known as the "family club". Bullfrog's son Kevin, played for the club, as did his nephews, brothers Garry, Mark and Graeme Hughes. Later, Garry Hughes' sons Glen, Steven and Corey would also play for the Bulldogs, while long-serving Bulldogs representative players Chris Anderson and Steve Folkes married his daughters. During the same period, brothers Steve, Chris and Peter Mortimer also had long and successful careers playing for Canterbury.

Anderson, Folkes and Kevin Moore would also go on to coach the Canterbury-Bankstown Bulldogs, with Anderson (1995) and Folkes (2004) coaching the club to premierships.
