= Steve Folkes =

Australian rugby league player and coach (1959–2018)

Personal information
- Full name: Steven John Folkes
- Born: 30 January 1959 Sydney, New South Wales, Australia
- Died: 27 February 2018 (aged 59) Sydney, New South Wales, Australia

Playing information
- Height: 178 cm (5 ft 10 in)
- Weight: 85 kg (13 st 5 lb)
- Position: Second-row
Club
Years	Team	Pld	T	G	FG	P
1978–89	Canterbury Bulldogs	235	45	0	0	159
1989–90	Hull FC	24	6	0	0	24
1991	Canterbury Bulldogs	10	1	0	0	4
	Total	269	52	0	0	187
Representative
Years	Team	Pld	T	G	FG	P
1986–88	New South Wales	9	0	0	0	0
1986–88	Australia	5	2	0	0	8

Coaching information
Club
Years	Team	Gms	W	D	L	W%
1998–08	Canterbury Bulldogs	288	162	7	119	56
Representative
Years	Team	Gms	W	D	L	W%
2014–16	Australia Women	3	1	0	2	33

Steven John Folkes (30 January 1959 – 27 February 2018) was an Australian professional rugby league footballer and coach of the Canterbury-Bankstown Bulldogs in the National Rugby League. He represented both New South Wales and Australia

== Playing career ==
Folkes, who was Captain of Punchbowl Boys' High School, came from the Bankstown Sports Junior Rugby League Club. He played 245 first grade games and 308 grade games for the Bulldogs between 1978 and 1991, as well as 24 games for Hull FC in England.

He also represented New South Wales on nine occasions in State of Origin football. At the end of the 1986 NSWRL season, he went on the 1986 Kangaroo tour of Great Britain and France. He played a total of five Tests between 1986 and 1988. As a player, Folkes played in 6 Grand Finals (1979, 80, 84, 85, 86 and 88) winning on four occasions.

== Coaching career ==
After serving as reserve grade coach of Canterbury between 1996 and 1997, Folkes was appointed coach of Canterbury-Bankstown to succeed Chris Anderson. In his first year as coach, Canterbury made the 1998 NRL grand final, where they lost to Wayne Bennett's Brisbane Broncos.

Canterbury-Bankstown appeared poised to claim the 2002 NRL premiership but were disqualified and stripped 37 premiership points after a major salary cap breach was uncovered. Folkes claimed his premiership two seasons later with a 16-13 victory over the Sydney Roosters in the grand final.

Steve Folkes was awarded Dally M Coach of the Year in 2004.

The 2004 grand final victory continued a unique tradition at the Bulldogs: Every coach appointed by the club since 1978 (Ted Glossop, Warren Ryan, Phil Gould, Chris Anderson and Folkes) has won a premiership. At the end of the 2007 season, Folkes' win record with the Bulldogs was 60%. On 7 April 2008, Canterbury-Bankstown announced that Folkes tenure as would end with the 2008 season. To date, he remains the club's longest serving coach

Following his departure from the Canterbury club, Folkes took up a position as strength and conditioning coach for the West Indies cricket team. In October 2009, Folkes returned to rugby league, accepting the role of strength and conditioning coach for the Wests Tigers. In 2011, he was an assistant coach with the club.

It was announced in May 2011 that Folkes would join the St George Illawarra Dragons as the assistant coach to Steve Price from 2012.

In 2014, Folkes was appointed head coach for the Australia women's national rugby league team.

== Personal life ==
Folkes was of English descent. He was married to Karen Moore, the daughter of Bulldogs 'godfather', Peter Moore. She died on 2 June 2013 from cancer.

== Death ==
Folkes died at his home on 27 February 2018, reportedly of a heart attack, at the age of 59. An autopsy found that he had been suffering from chronic traumatic encephalopathy, a neurodegenerative disease caused by repeated head injuries.

== Coaching record ==
Steve Folkes – Coaching Results by Season
NRL Team	Year	Games	Wins	Losses	Draws	Win %	Finals Series
Canterbury-Bankstown Bulldogs	1998	29	17	12	0	58.62%	Grand Final: 12-38 v Brisbane
Canterbury-Bankstown Bulldogs	1999	26	16	9	1	61.53%	Semi Final: 22-24 v Melbourne
Canterbury-Bankstown Bulldogs	2000	26	10	15	1	38.46%	
Canterbury-Bankstown Bulldogs	2001	28	17	8	3	60.71%	Semi Final: 10-52 v Cronulla
Canterbury-Bankstown Bulldogs	2002	24	20	3	1	83.3%	
Canterbury-Bankstown Bulldogs	2003	27	17	10	0	62.96%	Preliminary Final: 18-28 v Sydney Roosters
Canterbury-Bankstown Bulldogs	2004	28	22	6	0	78.57%	Grand Final: 16-13 v Sydney Roosters
Canterbury-Bankstown Bulldogs	2005	24	9	14	1	37.5%	
Canterbury-Bankstown Bulldogs	2006	26	17	9	0	65.38%	Preliminary Final: 20-37 v Brisbane
Canterbury-Bankstown Bulldogs	2007	26	12	14	0	46.15%	Semi Final: 6-25 v Parramatta
Canterbury-Bankstown Bulldogs	2008	24	5	19	0	20.83%	
Career		288	162	119	7	56.3%	at 30 September 2008
