= List of Canterbury-Bankstown Bulldogs players =

The Canterbury-Bankstown Bulldogs is a professional rugby league club in the National Rugby League (NRL), the premier rugby league football competition in Australia.

To date there have been over 880 first-grade players to wear the blue and white of the Bulldogs.

Based in Belmore, a suburb of Sydney, the Bulldogs in 1935 were admitted to the New South Wales Rugby League (NSWRL) competition, a predecessor of the current NRL competition.

Canterbury won its first premiership in just its fourth season (1938). At the time it made Canterbury the quickest club (barring the founding clubs) to win a premiership after admission to the competition, a record which was only recently beaten in 1999 by the Melbourne Storm. It won a second premiership in 1942 but then had to wait another 38 years before breaking through for a third title in 1980. During the 80s, the Bulldogs were a dominant force in the competition appearing in five Grand Finals, winning four of them. In the 90s they featured in the 1995 and 1998 Grand Finals, winning the former. Their most recent success was in 2004 when they beat the Sydney Roosters 16−13. The tryscorers were Hazem El Masri and Matt Utai, and the Clive Churchill Medal winner was Willie Mason.

== Players and statistics ==
Updated as at the end of the 2026 NRL season.
Players listed in cap order as allocated by the club (see more).

Club								Representative	
No.	Name	Career	Appearances	Tries	Goals	FGs	Points	Country	State
1	Jack Morrison	1935−1936	18	3	1	0	11	—	—
2	Harry Brown	1935−1936	7	0	0	0	0	—	—
3	Tom Carey	1935−1936	19	0	12	0	24	—	—
4	Fred Chaplin	1935−1936	14	1	0	0	3	—	—
5	Basil Crawford	1935	3	0	0	0	0	—	—
6	Vince Dwyer	1935	10	4	0	0	12	—	—
7	Sid Elliott	1935−1940	15	1	0	0	3	—	—
8	Jack Hartwell Sr.	1935−1936	43	1	0	0	3	—	—
9	Bob Lindfield	1935−1936	16	0	0	0	0	—	—
10	George Main	1935−1937	19	0	42	0	84	—	—
11	Jack McConnell	1935−1936	29	3	0	0	9	—	—
12	Frank Sponberg	1935−1944	110	25	0	0	75	—	—
13	Alan Wellington	1935	2	0	0	0	0	—	—
14	Harry Courtney	1935	5	0	0	0	0	—	—
15	Bill Joass	1935	4	0	0	0	0	—	—
16	Eddie Burns	1935−1950	212	60	8	0	196	—	—
17	Jack Hobson	1935	4	2	0	0	6	—	—
18	Mick McPhillips	1935	3	0	0	0	0	—	—
19	Clyde Cant	1935	3	0	0	0	0	—	—
20	Jack Coleman	1935	2	0	0	0	0	—	—
21	George Hall	1935	1	0	0	0	0	—	—
22	Ted Burdon	1935	11	3	0	0	9	—	—
23	Charlie Chignell	1935−1937	31	3	0	0	9	—	—
24	Joe Sharp	1935	2	1	0	0	3	—	—
25	Roy McCallum	1935−1940	45	7	0	0	21	—	—
26	Barry Neville	1935	3	0	0	0	0	—	—
27	Eddie Bowen	1935	2	0	0	0	0	—	—
28	Jack O'Sullivan	1935−1936	7	3	0	0	9	—	—
29	Fred Brighten	1935	3	0	0	0	0	—	—
30	Billy Knowles	1935−1936	3	0	0	0	0	—	—
31	Harry Hall	1935−1945	16	3	3	0	15	—	—
32	Charlie Morris	1935	1	0	0	0	0	—	—
33	Alan Brady	1936−1940	37	15	0	0	45	—	—
34	Bill Howes	1936−1937	12	2	0	0	6	—	—
35	Tom Kirk	1936−1939	42	8	105	0	234	—	—
36	Aub Mitchell	1936−1941	3	0	0	0	0	—	—
37	Henry Porter	1936−1948	142	7	18	0	57	—	—
38	Clinton Quinlivan	1936	3	1	0	0	3	—	—
39	Roy Gilchrist	1936−1938	5	3	0	0	9	—	—
40	Joe Gartner	1936−1941	56	31	0	0	93	—	—
41	George Mason	1936	12	0	3	0	6	—	—
42	Billy Porter	1936−1937	16	3	0	0	9	—	—
43	Billy Connell	1936	12	0	3	0	6	—	—
44	Roy McCarter	1937−1944	85	13	84	0	207	—	—
45	Jim McCormack	1937−1939	45	5	0	0	15	—	—
46	Bill Sponberg	1937	7	1	5	0	13	—	—
47	Jim Pratt	1937−1939	10	0	2	0	4	—	—
48	Vivian Saunders	1937	2	0	0	0	0	—	—
49	Jim Dickenson	1937−1939	8	0	0	0	0	—	—
50	Ossie Samuels	1937	4	1	0	0	3	—	—
51	Cec Fifield	1937	4	1	0	0	3	—	—
52	Jack Whitfield	1937	1	0	0	0	0	—	—
53	Gordon Clunas	1937−1944	15	0	0	0	0	—	—
54	Lloyd Atkins	1937	1	0	0	0	0	—	—
55	Ted Anderson	1938−1946	78	15	14	0	73	—	—
56	Jim Champion	1938−1939	30	6	1	0	20	—	—
57	Roy Kirkaldy	1938−1948	147	11	6	0	45	—	—
58	Edgar Newham	1938−1948	72	55	0	0	175	AUS	—
59	Harry Griffin	1938	6	1	0	0	3	—	—
60	Jim Duncombe	1938−1940	4	1	0	0	3	—	—
61	Geoffrey Robinson	1939	4	0	0	0	0	—	—
62	Bob Allison	1939−1945	67	6	0	0	18	—	—
63	Alan Kent	1939	1	0	0	0	0	—	—
64	Jack Bonnyman	1940−1944	58	15	0	0	45	—	—
65	Merv Denton	1940, 1945	21	10	0	0	30	—	—
66	Lin Johnson	1940−1946	91	0	144	0	288	—	—
67	Jack Reilly	1940	4	1	0	0	3	—	—
68	Jim Gibbs	1940	13	4	5	0	22	—	—
69	Bob Farrar	1940−1945	55	10	0	0	30	—	—
70	Bernie Martin	1940	2	1	0	0	3	—	—
71	Bob Russell	1940−1942	11	2	0	0	8	—	—
72	Les Clare	1940−1942	4	1	0	0	3	—	—
73	Arthur Morris	1940−1944	22	3	0	0	9	—	—
74	Ron Bailey	1941−1946	79	30	0	0	90	—	—
75	Ron Knight	1941−1943	11	4	0	0	12	—	—
76	Tom Lyons	1941	4	1	0	0	4	—	—
77	Bob Jackson	1941−1942	19	9	14	0	55	—	—
78	George Elley	1942−1945	36	10	0	0	30	—	—
79	Charlie Simmatt	1942	1	0	0	0	0	—	—
80	Jackie Stewart	1942−1944	6	1	0	0	3	—	—
81	Tom Ezart	1942−1949	17	4	0	0	12	—	—
82	Tony Nash	1942	7	7	0	0	21	—	—
83	Jim Hargreaves	1942−1943	5	0	0	0	0	—	—
84	George Day	1943	4	0	0	0	0	—	—
85	Lew Fisher	1943−1944	12	1	0	0	3	—	—
86	Billy Harris	1943−1944	19	3	0	0	9	—	—
87	Bill Shippen	1943	1	0	0	0	0	—	—
88	Steve Zaccaria	1943−1945	5	1	0	0	3	—	—
89	Alan Woods	1943	1	0	0	0	0	—	—
90	Elwyn Ryan	1943	9	1	0	0	3	—	—
91	John Benson	1943	2	0	0	0	0	—	—
92	William Iles	1943	1	0	0	0	0	—	—
93	Ron Kelly	1943−1946	14	1	0	0	3	—	—
94	Charlie Jupp	1943	3	0	0	0	0	—	—
95	Ray Power	1943−1945	12	4	1	0	14	—	—
96	Tom Small	1943	3	0	0	0	0	—	—
97	Bill Anslow	1943−1945	2	0	0	0	0	—	—
98	Ernie Bright	1944−1945	3	0	0	0	0	—	—
99	George Cook	1944	2	0	0	0	0	—	—
99A	Reg Cook	1944	1	0	0	0	0	—	—
100	John Donohoe	1944	7	3	0	0	9	—	—
101	George Kilham	1944−1947	44	16	0	0	48	—	—
102	John Payne	1944−1946	24	10	0	6	42	—	—
103	Alf Watsford	1944	14	10	0	0	30	—	—
104	Joe Wilson	1944	3	0	0	0	0	—	—
105	John Anderson	1944	3	0	0	0	0	—	—
106	Len Willan	1944	11	5	0	0	15	—	—
107	Norm Young	1944−1948	39	16	0	0	48	—	—
108	Jim Collins	1944−1951	77	19	4	0	65	—	—
109	Len Bennett	1945	9	4	2	0	16	—	—
110	George Endycott	1945−1946	9	1	19	0	41	—	—
111	Ross Henderson	1945	1	0	0	0	0	—	—
112	Roy Mitchell	1945−1946	3	1	0	0	3	—	—
113	John Harding	1945	6	2	0	0	6	—	—
114	Vince Whale	1945−1946	13	7	0	0	21	—	—
115	Billy Anderson	1945	2	0	0	0	0	—	—
116	Len Holmes	1945−1951	100	20	48	0	156	—	—
117	Billy Mitchell	1945	2	1	0	0	3	—	—
118	Eddie Hall	1945	1	0	0	0	0	—	—
119	Bob Hobbs	1945	3	2	0	7	20	—	—
120	Ron Wilkinson	1945	1	0	0	0	0	—	—
121	George Maddock	1945	1	0	0	0	0	—	—
122	Keith Gersbach	1945−1946	16	7	0	0	21	—	—
123	Dave Hickey	1945	2	2	0	0	6	—	—
124	Ken Charlton	1946−1954	147	7	0	0	21	—	—
125	Bert Scraggs	1946	3	0	0	0	0	—	—
126	Jeff Simmonds	1946−1951	50	22	0	0	66	—	—
127	Roy Hasson	1946−1950	53	21	79	0	0	—	—
128	Dick Johnson	1946−1948	38	1	2	0	7	—	—
129	Eddie Tracey	1946−1949	38	24	0	0	72	—	—
130	Alf Nixon	1946−1950	20	2	3	0	12	—	—
131	Alan Rice	1946	2	0	0	0	0	—	—
132	Bruce Hopkins	1947−1949	47	12	66	0	168	AUS	—
133	Morrie Murphy	1947	19	14	0	0	42	—	—
134	Jack O'Brien	1947−1948	4	0	0	0	0	—	—
135	Keith Pritchard	1947−1949	14	9	2	0	31	—	—
136	Alister Clarke	1947−1948	24	2	0	0	6	—	—
137	Bob Baxter	1947−1957	12	0	0	0	0	—	—
138	Jack Hartwell Jr.	1947−1951	24	4	5	0	22	—	—
139	Jack Fallon	1947	6	0	0	0	0	—	—
140	Harry Emptage	1947−1948	11	1	0	0	3	—	—
141	Bernie Courtney	1948	1	0	0	0	0	—	—
142	Jim Wilson	1948	3	0	0	0	0	—	—
143	Ken Hemsworth	1948	5	0	1	0	2	—	—
144	Merv Curran	1948	7	0	0	0	0	—	—
145	Frank Stewart	1948−1950	8	1	0	0	4	—	—
146	Ron Willey	1948−1953	70	5	136	0	287	AUS	—
147	Noel Hickey	1948	2	1	0	0	3	—	—
148	Hector McDonald	1948	3	0	0	0	0	—	—
149	Jack English	1948−1949	12	0	0	0	0	—	—
150	Vic Jackson	1948	5	0	0	0	0	—	—
151	Cedric de Belle	1948−1952	55	5	0	0	15	—	—
152	Frank Flynn	1948−1952	70	34	0	0	102	—	—
153	Jim Tutill	1948−1954	18	4	0	0	12	—	—
154	Neville Charlton	1948−1953	62	22	2	0	70	—	—
155	Athol Halpin	1949−1950	17	3	0	0	9	—	—
156	Don Sinclair	1949−1951	51	5	0	0	15	—	—
157	Gordon Buchanan	1949	1	0	0	0	0	—	—
158	Alan Crumpton	1949−1953	33	15	0	0	45	—	—
159	Bill O'Connor	1949	1	0	0	0	0	—	—
160	Ron Treuer	1949−1952	43	1	0	0	3	—	—
161	Frank O'Sullivan	1949	8	1	0	0	3	—	—
162	Cec Cooper	1949−1956	79	29	0	0	87	—	—
163	Tom Byrne	1950	17	6	2	0	22	—	—
164	Wally Murray	1950	3	0	3	0	6	—	—
165	Vic Bulgin	1950−1951	10	0	3	0	6	—	—
166	Jack Coglan	1950	1	0	0	0	0	—	—
167	Col Cooper	1950−1954	48	17	0	0	51	—	—
168	Alan Schwebel	1951−1955	70	11	0	0	33	—	—
169	Ken Taylor	1951	1	0	0	0	0	—	—
170	Laurie White	1951−1954	18	0	8	0	16	—	—
171	Jack Bradley	1951-1954	45	6	48	0	114	—	—
172	Fred Dunn	1951-1957	79	5	168	0	351	—	—
173	Mick Lette	1951−1952	28	3	0	0	12	—	—
174	Laurie Campbell	1951	1	0	0	0	0	−	−
175	Ron Smith	1951−1952	10	2	0	0	6	—	—
176	Brian Barnes	1952	13	1	1	0	5	—	—
177	Jack Gearin	1952	6	0	0	0	0	—	—
178	Pat Rankin	1952−1953	29	1	0	0	3	—	—
179	Barry Stenhouse	1952−1958	30	19	1	0	59	—	—
180	Jack White	1952−1954	26	2	0	0	0	—	—
181	Fred Anderson	1952−1963	197	16	0	0	48	SAF	—
182	Alan Hockley	1952-1958	28	2	0	0	6	—	—
183	Dave Kerrigan	1952	4	0	0	0	0	—	—
184	Bill Miller	1952-1957	45	6	0	0	18	—	—
185	Ray Gartner	1953−1964	185	46	0	0	138	—	—
186	Carl Keogh	1953	18	2	0	0	6	—	—
187	Ted Schell	1953−1954	24	2	0	0	6	—	—
188	Jim Gartner	1953−1958	25	3	0	0	9	—	—
189	Mick Keevers	1953−1955	1	0	0	0	0	—	—
190	Dave Schiemer	1953−1954	9	3	0	0	9	—	—
191	Ron Ricketts	1953	1	0	0	0	0	—	—
192	Brian Whitmore	1953−1956	16	1	12	0	27	—	—
193	Wally Brown	1954−1955	17	2	0	0	6	—	—
194	Kev O'Callaghan	1953−1956	29	1	0	0	3	—	—
195	Geoff Stretton	1953	1	0	0	0	0	—	—
196	Barry Nelson	1954−1961	61	5	0	0	15	—	—
197	Leo Trevena	1954	11	2	5	0	16	—	—
198	Bruce Flynn	1954	1	0	0	0	0	—	—
199	Cliff Dunn	1954	1	0	0	0	0	—	—
200	Keith Hudson	1954	6	3	0	0	9	—	—
201	Malcolm Clift	1954	4	0	0	0	0	—	—
202	Peter Considine	1954−1956	11	5	0	0	15	—	—
203	Mal Jones	1954−1956	17	1	0	0	3	—	—
204	Doug Hill	1954−1956	5	0	0	0	0	—	—
205	Vince Nolan	1954	2	0	0	0	0	—	—
206	Alan Mason	1954−1955	13	1	0	0	3	—	—
207	Nick Evans	1954−1962	86	9	5	0	37	—	—
208	Graham Barclay	1955	3	0	0	0	0	—	—
209	Jack Bowman	1955−1956	32	6	0	0	18	—	—
210	Reg Freebody	1955−1956	28	8	0	0	24	—	—
211	Mike McGee	1955	12	0	0	0	0	—	—
212	Jack Williams	1955−1957	31	0	0	0	0	—	—
213	Peter Hayes	1955−1958	11	2	19	0	44	—	—
214	Kevin Bennett	1955	2	0	0	0	0	—	—
215	Joe Palmer	1955−1958	13	0	0	0	0	—	—
216	Ron Dewey	1955	3	0	0	0	0	—	—
217	Mick Downey	1955	3	1	0	0	3	—	—
218	Ron Thornton	1955−1961	103	15	1	0	47	—	—
219	Col Geelan	1956−1957	32	2	0	0	6	—	—
220	Ern Gilligan	1956−1959	16	6	0	0	18	—	—
221	John Kell	1956	17	0	61	0	122	—	—
222	Charlie McAlpine	1956	1	0	0	0	0	—	—
223	Les McDermott	1956−1957	4	0	0	0	0	—	—
224	Alan Lynch	1956−1957	30	1	0	0	3	—	—
225	Albert Paul	1956	17	5	0	0	15	—	—
226	Brian Rose	1956−1957	16	3	0	0	9	—	—
227	Colin Wells	1956	1	0	0	0	0	—	—
228	Paul Lawson	1956	2	0	0	0	6	—	—
229	Bill Petley	1956−1963	93	7	82	0	185	—	—
230	Clive Gartner	1956−1968	86	16	0	0	48	—	—
231	Don Kerr	1957	18	0	0	0	0	—	—
232	Tom Shiner	1957	8	0	0	0	0	—	—
233	Rex Beath	1957	1	0	0	0	0	—	—
234	Charlie Donovan	1957	8	0	0	0	0	—	—
235	Noel Ryan	1957−1958	16	2	0	0	6	—	—
236	Alan Watkins	1957	2	0	0	0	0	—	—
237	Brian Owens	1957	11	2	0	0	6	—	—
238	Denis Dooley	1957−1961	19	1	0	0	3	—	—
239	Doug Gibbs	1957	3	0	0	0	0	—	—
240	Noel Morgan	1957−1958	3	0	0	0	0	—	—
241	Kevin Brown	1958−1963	94	17	0	0	51	—	—
242	Vince Everingham	1958	1	0	0	0	0	—	—
243	Pat Fitzgerald	1958−1964	35	2	0	0	6	—	—
244	Bill Owens	1958	13	1	0	0	3	—	—
245	Ken Rowlands	1958−1960	40	12	24	0	84	—	—
246	Reg Cooper	1958−1959	14	3	0	0	9	—	—
247	Mick Vaughan	1958−1961	28	5	0	0	15	—	—
248	John Russell	1958−1964	61	13	1	0	41	—	—
249	Bob Ambrose	1958−1961	38	0	1	0	2	—	—
250	Ken Peet	1958−1961	23	3	0	0	9	—	—
251	Don McIntyre	1958−1961	6	0	0	0	0	—	—
252	Kevin Cox	1959−1960	27	1	0	0	3	—	—
253	Brian Davies	1959−1962	57	7	89	0	189	—	—
254	Ross Kite	1959−1961	42	11	3	0	39	—	—
255	Arthur Fenwick	1959	3	0	1	0	2	—	—
256	Dick McDermott	1959−1965	42	6	0	0	18	—	—
257	Noel Collie	1959−1962	40	16	0	0	48	—	—
258	Dick Pickett	1959−1963	43	4	0	0	12	—	—
259	Brian Thornton	1959	4	0	1	0	3	—	—
260	Joe Bassett	1959−1960	6	0	0	0	52	—	—
261	Les White	1959−1963	6	0	0	0	0	—	—
262	Col Brown	1960−1970	137	4	0	0	12	—	—
263	Ron Dick	1960−1961	15	5	0	0	15	—	—
264	Pat Wilde	1960	1	0	0	0	0	—	—
265	Col Oates	1961	7	1	0	0	3	—	—
266	Bob McWilliams	1961	2	0	0	0	0	—	—
267	Ken Dawson	1961−1964	63	1	0	0	3	—	—
268	Allan Smith	1961−1962	7	0	0	0	0	—	—
269	Bob Laut	1961	1	0	0	0	0	—	—
270	Peter Atkinson	1961	5	1	0	0	3	—	—
271	Barry Smith	1961−1969	89	18	14	0	82	—	—
272	Graham Tonks	1961−1962	5	1	0	0	3	—	—
273	Dick Mulherton	1961−1962	11	0	38	0	76	—	—
274	Ray Beaven	1962	14	3	0	0	9	—	—
275	John Conna	1962−1965	17	1	0	0	3	—	—
276	Doug Hambilton	1962	1	0	0	0	0	—	—
277	Jim Matthews	1962−1963	17	2	3	0	12	—	—
278	Roger Sheedy	1962	2	1	3	0	9	—	—
279	Laurie Neale	1962	1	0	0	0	0	—	—
280	Tom Cooper	1962−1963	2	0	5	0	10	—	—
281	Roger Ward	1962	2	0	0	0	0	—	—
282	Heinz Blume	1963	15	1	0	0	3	—	—
283	Johnny Burns	1963−1964	17	4	0	0	12	—	—
284	Les Johns	1963−1971	103	14	233	19	545	AUS	—
285	Kevin Neal	1963−1965	28	2	0	0	6	—	—
286	Doug McManus	1963−1966	26	1	0	0	3	—	—
287	Kevin Goldspink	1963−1969	106	6	0	0	18	AUS	—
288	Don Hobson	1963−1965	23	0	0	0	0	—	—
289	Terry Johnston	1963−1964	19	1	13	0	29	—	—
290	Rod Pilon	1963	3	0	0	0	0	—	—
291	Ernie McLean	1963	2	0	0	0	0	—	—
292	Alan Ross	1963−1965	16	8	1	0	26	—	—
293	Ray Newton	1963	5	0	0	0	0	—	—
294	Bernie de Witt	1964−1966	36	5	0	0	15	—	—
295	Col Goldspink	1964	11	0	0	0	0	—	—
296	Ralph Harding	1964−1965	29	3	0	0	9	—	—
297	Paul Hassab	1964−1965	22	1	0	0	3	—	—
298	Leo Toohey	1964−1968	72	6	0	0	8	—	—
299	Keith Glen	1964−1966	29	0	0	0	0	—	—
300	Roger Pearman	1964−1966	18	3	0	0	9	—	—
301	Arthur Connell	1964	1	0	0	0	0	—	—
302	Dennis Ward	1964−1967	26	6	4	0	24	—	—
303	Johnny Greaves	1964−1972	112	38	27	0	168	AUS	—
304	Dick Wells	1964	4	0	0	0	0	—	—
305	Les Boyle	1964	1	0	0	0	0	—	—
306	Barry Reynolds	1965−1968	25	7	0	0	21	—	—
307	George Taylforth	1965−1969	86	8	192	1	410	—	—
308	Jim Davidson	1965	1	0	0	0	0	—	—
309	Clive Bryant	1965−1967	21	4	0	0	12	—	—
310	Ron Ellis	1965	4	0	0	0	0	—	—
311	Don Workman	1965−1966	3	0	0	0	0	—	—
312	Jim Hall	1965−1966	13	0	0	0	0	—	—
313	Ross Kidd	1966−1969	52	8	0	0	24	—	—
314	Barry Phillis	1966−1976	44	1	0	0	3	—	—
315	Bruce McKinney	1966−1968	20	0	0	0	0	—	—
316	Ron Raper	1966−1972	128	27	38	10	177	—	—
317	Merv Hicks	1966−1970	78	16	0	1	50	GBR	—
318	Bob Hunt	1966	1	0	0	0	0	—	—
319	Bob Doyle	1966−1970	61	9	0	0	27	—	—
320	Max Brown	1966−1970	64	24	6	0	84	—	—
321	Barry Dickenson	1966	2	0	0	0	0	—	—
322	Ray Windshuttle	1966	2	0	0	0	0	—	—
323	Kevin Ryan	1967−1969	52	5	0	0	15	—	—
324	Bob Hagan	1967−1969	45	6	6	0	30	—	—
325	Dick Webb	1967−1969	19	5	0	0	15	—	—
326	Marty Driscoll	1967−1971	36	5	0	0	15	—	—
327	John Larcombe	1967−1968	12	4	0	0	12	—	—
328	Brian Wedgwood	1967−1968	8	1	0	0	3	—	—
329	Terry Bawden	1967−1968	17	1	32	6	79	—	—
330	Col Hughes	1967−1968	7	1	0	0	3	—	—
331	Terry Reynolds	1968−1971	46	12	0	1	37	—	—
332	Johnny Rhodes	1968−1972	62	24	0	0	72	AUS	—
333	Bill Walsh	1968−1969	14	1	0	0	3	—	—
334	Norm Thomas	1968−1975, 1977	76	5	0	0	15	—	—
335	Pat Thomas	1968	2	0	0	0	0	—	—
336	Brian McPherson	1968	2	0	0	0	0	—	—
337	Kevin Gentles	1968	1	0	0	0	0	—	—
338	Doug Kelly	1969−1970	10	0	0	0	4	—	—
339	Les Perry	1969−1970	24	3	1	0	11	—	—
340	Ray Strudwick	1969−1972	49	10	0	0	30	—	—
341	Alan Allison	1969	5	1	0	0	3	—	—
342	Colin Greenwood	1969	2	0	0	0	0	—	—
343	Dennis Scahill	1969−1974	49	9	0	0	27	—	—
344	Barry Norden	1969	7	1	0	0	3	—	—
345	Brian Rowe	1969	2	0	0	0	0	—	—
346	Gary Stewart	1969, 1975	8	1	0	0	3	—	—
347	Malcolm Blakeley	1969	1	0	0	0	0	—	—
348	John Darby	1969−1970	10	0	0	0	0	—	—
349	Peter Louis	1969	3	0	0	0	0	—	—
350	Allan Wells	1969	1	0	0	0	0	—	—
351	Dennis Beeby	1970	4	0	0	0	0	—	—
352	Tony Brenton	1970	11	2	0	0	6	—	—
353	Alan Burwell	1970−1972	48	9	0	0	27	—	—
354	Ron Costello	1970−1972	61	11	0	0	33	AUS	—
355	Neville Hornery	1970−1972	45	6	6	0	27	—	—
356	Peter Inskip	1970−1971	31	2	97	3	206	—	—
357	Bill Noonan	1970−1978	161	10	0	0	30	NZL	—
358	Wayne Peckham	1970−1972	26	7	0	1	23	—	—
359	Ernie Graham	1970−1971	5	1	0	0	3	—	—
360	Peter van Gulick	1970−1972	23	1	0	0	3	—	—
361	Phil Charlton	1970−1978	68	0	0	0	0	—	—
362	Graham Herring	1970−1972	13	1	0	0	3	—	—
363	Dennis Manteit	1970−1973	63	8	0	0	24	—	—
364	Terry Murphy	1970−1974	37	0	0	0	21	—	—
365	Bruce Conneeley	1970	2	0	0	0	0	—	—
366	Les Hutchings	1970−1973	43	8	0	0	24	—	—
367	Ray Payne	1970−1973	16	1	0	0	3	—	—
368	John Armstrong	1971	20	4	0	0	12	—	—
369	Wayne Golding	1971	5	0	0	0	0	—	—
370	Peter Bellamy	1971	16	3	2	0	13	—	—
371	Greg Purcell	1971−1973	37	2	3	0	12	—	—
372	Rod Jackson	1971−1972	12	3	0	0	9	—	—
373	Graham Tucker	1971	4	1	0	0	3	—	—
374	Steve Calder	1971−1972	6	0	0	0	0	—	—
375	Chris Anderson	1971−1984	230	94	0	0	303	AUS	NSW
376	Roger Kinlyside	1971	2	0	0	0	0	—	—
377	Garry Dowling	1971−1978	113	39	22	1	162	—	—
378	Bernie Lowther	1972−1974	56	27	0	0	81	—	—
379	Henry Tatana	1972−1974	52	3	160	0	329	—	—
380	Mick Trypas	1972	10	6	0	1	19	—	—
381	Phil Young	1972−1976	66	10	0	0	30	—	—
382	Les Ewing	1972	14	1	0	0	3	—	—
383	Geoff Connell	1972−1975	60	1	2	0	7	—	—
384	Ray Dodd	1972	3	1	0	0	3	—	—
385	Graham Faint	1972	3	0	0	0	0	—	—
386	John Peek	1972−1977	89	24	0	0	72	—	—
387	John McDonell	1973−1974	37	7	0	0	21	—	—
388	Don Rogers	1973−1974	27	11	0	0	33	—	—
389	Peter Winchester	1973−1976	43	4	0	0	12	—	—
390	Tony Herring	1973	7	1	0	0	3	—	—
391	Dave Cotter	1973	2	0	0	0	0	—	—
392	Stan Cutler	1973−1982	128	33	58	0	215	—	—
393	Max Cole	1973−1975	44	18	0	0	54	—	—
394	Harold Stringer	1973	3	1	0	0	3	—	—
395	Greg Howard	1973−1977	22	2	0	0	6	—	—
396	John Delaney	1974−1975	8	0	0	0	0	—	—
397	Garry Hughes	1974−1984	163	13	19	1	78	—	—
398	Mark Hughes	1974−1983	174	32	20	4	141	—	—
399	Brian Lockwood	1974	16	1	0	0	3	GBR	—
400	Doug Laughton	1974	5	0	0	0	0	GBR	—
401	Don Moseley	1974−1976	51	5	127	0	269	—	—
402	George Peponis	1974−1982	131	27	0	0	81	AUS	—
403	Graeme Hughes	1974−1982	127	15	39	0	123	—	NSW
404	Peter Cassilles	1974−1982	113	8	0	0	24	—	—
405	Keith Harris	1975−1976	40	9	0	0	27	—	—
406	Tim Pickup	1975−1979	47	10	0	0	30	AUS	—
407	Mick Ryan	1975−1978	57	12	0	0	36	—	—
408	Tom Gillogly	1975	3	0	2	0	4	—	—
409	Mick Adams	1975−1976	23	8	0	0	24	ENG	—
410	Steve White	1975−1976	5	1	0	0	3	—	—
411	Chris Skelton	1975	1	2	0	0	6	—	—
412	Bob McCarthy	1976−1977	40	19	0	0	57	—	—
413	Steve Mortimer	1976−1988	272	79	0	5	270	AUS	NSW
414	Peter O'Neill	1976−1977	14	11	0	0	33	—	—
415	Steve Hage	1976−1978	36	3	10	0	29	—	—
416	Mal Creevey	1976−1980	12	10	0	0	30	—	—
417	Steve Gearin	1976−1982, 1985	131	63	405	0	1006	—	—
418	Eric Hughes	1976	14	5	0	0	15	—	—
419	Mick Basham	1976	1	0	0	0	0	—	—
420	John Dransfield	1976	1	0	0	0	0	—	—
421	Greg Mullane	1977−1978, 1984−1986	6	0	0	0	0	—	—
422	Gary Stevens	1977−1978	25	0	0	0	0	—	—
423	Greg Brentnall	1977−1983	108	27	0	2	86	AUS	NSW
424	Ray Kear	1977−1979	11	2	7	0	20	—	—
425	Dave Allison	1977	9	0	0	0	0	—	—
426	Peter Mortimer	1977−1987	190	78	0	0	4	—	NSW
427	Geoff Robinson	1977-1984, 1986	139	6	0	0	0	—	—
428	John Coveney	1977−1983	100	2	0	0	6	—	—
429	Gerard Raper	1977	2	0	0	0	0	—	—
430	Pat English	1977−1983	57	2	0	0	6	—	—
431	Greg Cook	1978−1981	36	1	0	0	3	—	—
432	Steve Folkes	1978−1991	245	46	0	0	163	AUS	NSW
433	Chris Mortimer	1978−1987	191	29	29	1	161	AUS	NSW
434	Stuart Collis	1978−1979	5	0	0	0	0	—	—
435	Dave Moffett	1979−1981	32	1	0	0	4	—	—
436	John Abbott	1979	10	0	0	0	0	—	—
437	Terry McCartney	1979−1981	9	2	0	0	6	—	—
438	Peter Smith	1979−1980	19	0	0	0	0	—	—
439	Graeme Faux	1979−1980	9	0	0	0	0	—	—
440	Leo Driver	1979	1	0	0	0	0	—	—
441	Gary Sullivan	1979−1981	2	0	0	0	0	—	—
442	Allen Geelan	1980−1981	9	1	0	0	3	—	—
443	Lee Pomfret	1980−1981	15	4	0	0	12	—	—
444	Neil Baker	1981−1983	24	7	0	4	33	—	—
445	Ray Downie	1981	3	0	0	0	0	—	—
446	Steve Want	1981−1983	13	6	0	0	18	—	—
447	Steve Mullen	1981−1983	19	2	0	0	6	—	—
448	Craig Madsen	1981−1982	7	0	0	0	0	—	—
449	Joe Reaiche	1981	1	0	0	0	0	—	—
450	Greg Sankey	1981−1983	13	2	0	0	7	—	—
451	Tony Davies	1981−1983	13	4	0	0	14	—	—
452	Andrew Farrar	1981−1990	186	39	32	1	220	AUS	NSW
453	Paul Gearin	1981−1982	2	0	0	0	0	—	—
454	George Fahd	1981	1	0	0	0	0	—	—
455	Dennis Donoghue	1982	2	0	0	0	0	—	—
456	Tony Armstrong	1982−1983	33	16	45	0	146	—	—
457	Tas Baitieri	1982−1983	45	1	0	0	3	—	—
458	Chris Hughes	1982	2	0	0	0	0	—	—
459	Mark Bird	1982	1	0	0	0	0	—	—
460	John Kasbarian	1982	1	0	0	0	0	—	—
461	Tony McWilliam	1982	1	0	0	0	0	—	—
462	Mark Brennan	1982	3	0	0	0	0	—	—
463	Jim Leis	1983−1985	35	2	0	0	8	—	—
464	Phil Gould	1983−1985	40	3	1	0	13	—	—
465	Ross Conlon	1983−1984	38	9	120	0	276	AUS	NSW
466	Terry Leabeater	1983−1984	6	0	0	0	0	—	—
467	Michael Pitman	1983	18	0	0	0	0	—	—
468	Billy Johnstone	1983−1986	82	7	0	0	28	—	—
469	Michael Hagan	1983−1988	80	9	0	0	36	—	QLD
470	Jack Anslow	1983−1988	3	0	0	0	0	—	—
471	Geoff Spotswood	1983	5	0	0	0	0	—	—
472	Michael Potter	1983−1988	80	14	0	0	56	—	NSW
473	Paul Langmack	1983−1990	175	25	0	0	100	AUS	NSW
474	Gerald Celarc	1983	1	0	0	0	0	—	—
475	Mark Harrigan	1983	1	0	0	0	0	—	—
476	Peter Kelly	1984−1987	68	2	0	0	8	—	NSW
477	Terry Lamb	1984−1996	262	123	375	37	1279	AUS	NSW
478	Kevin Pobjie	1984	8	4	0	0	16	—	—
479	Peter Tunks	1984−1989	119	15	0	0	60	—	NSW
480	David Burnes	1984	8	2	0	0	8	—	—
481	Peter Johnston	1984−1986	17	1	3	0	10	—	—
482	Mark Bugden	1984−1988	64	4	0	0	16	—	—
483	Brian Battese	1984−1985	43	4	0	0	16	—	—
484	Greg Brown	1984	2	2	0	0	8	—	—
485	David Gillespie	1984−1990	121	13	0	0	52	AUS	NSW
486	Max Mannix	1984−1985	9	1	0	0	4	—	—
487	Darryl Brohman	1984−1985	23	0	0	0	0	—	QLD
488	Steve O'Brien	1984−1988	57	21	0	0	84	—	—
489	Phil Sigsworth	1985−1986	24	4	2	0	20	—	–
490	Darren Meredith	1985	1	0	0	0	0	—	—
491	Matthew Callinan	1985−1986	12	6	0	0	24	—	—
492	Jason Alchin	1985−1990	70	8	2	1	37	—	—
493	Chris Doyle	1985−1986	8	0	0	1	1	—	—
494	John Elias	1986	11	0	0	0	0	—	—
495	Sandy Campbell	1986−1988	49	11	0	0	44	—	—
496	Paul Dunn	1986−1990	100	4	0	0	16	AUS	NSW
497	Mark Sargent	1986−1988	19	0	0	0	0	—	—
498	Glen Frendo	1986−1987	12	3	0	0	12	—	—
499	Greg Whitbread	1986−1987	8	0	0	0	0	—	—
500	David Boyd	1986−1987	8	1	0	0	4	—	—
501	Tony Currie	1986−1988	39	14	0	0	56	AUS	QLD
502	Scott Bennett	1987−1988	7	0	0	0	0	—	—
503	James Donnelly	1987−1988	14	0	0	0	0	—	—
504	Michael Reid	1987	3	0	0	0	0	—	—
505	Eddie Muller	1987−1988	13	0	0	0	0	—	—
506	Pat Jarvis	1987	12	0	0	0	0	—	NSW
507	Darren McCarthy	1987−1989	15	4	4	0	24	—	—
508	Colin Whitfield	1987	12	0	11	0	22	—	—
509	Paul Dixon	1987	2	0	0	0	0	GBR	—
510	Henry Raymond	1987−1990	19	9	0	0	36	—	—
511	Glen Nissen	1988−1991	68	16	0	0	64	—	—
512	Martin Ebb	1988	1	0	0	0	0	—	—
513	Robin Thorne	1988−1989	38	8	0	0	32	—	—
514	Peter Davies	1988	3	0	0	0	0	—	—
515	Brandon Lee	1988−1989	29	2	0	0	8	—	—
516	Joe Thomas	1988−1990	55	7	0	0	28	—	—
517	Theo Anast	1988−1989	2	0	0	0	0	—	—
518	Graham Pearce	1988	1	0	0	0	0	—	—
519	Greg Barwick	1988−1989	6	0	10	0	20	—	—
520	Simon Gillies	1988−1998	161	23	0	0	92	—	—
521	Darren Currie	1989	13	3	0	0	12	—	—
522	Brett Ross	1989	7	1	3	0	10	—	—
523	Greg Mackey	1989	14	4	0	0	16	—	—
524	Jamie Corcoran	1989−1991	36	8	21	0	74	—	—
525	Grant Ellis	1989	7	0	0	0	0	—	—
526	Kevin Moore	1989−1994	37	7	0	0	28	—	—
527	Bal Numapo	1989	1	0	0	0	0	PNG	—
528	Mark Elia	1989	9	1	0	0	4	NZL	—
529	Glen Haggath	1989−1990	18	0	0	0	0	—	—
530	Geordi Peats	1989−1994	54	4	0	0	16	—	—
531	Mark Watson	1989	1	0	0	0	0	—	—
532	David McCann	1989	1	0	0	0	0	—	—
533	Darren Blythe	1989	4	0	0	0	0	—	—
534	Kyle White	1989−1991	25	4	0	0	16	—	—
535	David Ebeling	1989−1990	2	0	0	0	0	—	—
536	Jamie Thompson	1989	3	0	0	0	0	—	—
537	Matt Fuller	1989−1990	5	0	0	0	0	—	—
538	Dean Pay	1989−1995	109	6	0	0	24	AUS	NSW
539	Paul Akkary	1989	1	0	0	0	0	—	—
540	Mark Brokenshire	1990−1994	79	0	0	0	0	—	—
541	Mark Robinson	1990−1991	24	6	0	0	24	—	—
542	Mitch Newton	1990−1998	106	3	0	0	12	—	—
543	Craig Dean	1990	6	0	0	0	0	—	—
544	Darren Smith	1990−1994, 1999−2002	185	53	1	0	214	AUS	QLD
545	Matthew Ryan	1990−1998	95	34	0	0	132	—	—
546	Brad Cowell	1990	1	0	0	0	0	—	—
547	Michael Simpson	1990−1991	8	0	0	0	0	—	—
548	Perry Smith	1990	1	0	0	0	0	—	—
549	Ewan McGrady	1990−1993	60	31	5	2	136	—	—
550	Mark Ryan	1990	2	0	0	0	0	—	—
551	Jason McLean	1990−1992	7	1	3	0	10	—	—
552	David Seidenkamp	1990−1991	2	0	0	0	0	—	—
553	Andy Patmore	1990−1993	52	19	0	0	76	—	—
554	Michael Appleby	1990	1	0	0	0	0	—	—
555	Scott Barrett	1990	1	0	0	0	0	—	—
556	Craig McKeough	1990−1991	9	2	0	0	8	—	—
557	Jason Smith	1990−1995	63	4	1	0	18	AUS	QLD
558	Barry Ward	1990−1993, 1997−2001	91	4	0	0	16	—	—
559	Darren Brown	1991	9	0	0	0	0	—	—
560	Bruce McGuire	1991−1992	39	7	0	0	28	AUS	—
561	Jarrod McCracken	1991−1995	80	24	0	0	96	NZL	—
562	Scott Tronc	1991−1992	30	1	0	0	4	—	—
563	Troy Cassell	1991−1992	25	2	0	0	8	—	—
564	Steve Mavin	1991	12	3	0	0	12	—	—
565	Marty Crequer	1991	3	0	7	0	14	—	—
566	Jonathan Davies	1991	14	7	36	0	100	GBR	—
567	Steve Reardon	1991−2003	163	15	0	0	60	—	—
568	Sean Skelton	1991−1992	10	0	0	0	0	—	—
569	Jason McGrady	1991−1992	7	0	0	0	0	—	—
570	Paul Doolan	1991−1993	40	10	0	0	40	—	—
571	Troy Clarke	1992	9	5	2	0	24	—	—
572	Glen Hughes	1992−2004	178	20	0	0	80	—	—
573	Robert Relf	1992−1999	126	10	0	0	40	—	—
574	Gavin Hill	1992−1993	33	1	73	0	150	NZL	—
575	Steve Pickett	1992	1	0	0	0	0	—	—
576	Craig Polla-Mounter	1992−2001	192	41	0	4	168	—	—
577	Jason Williams	1992−1995	73	34	0	0	136	NZL	—
578	Darren Senter	1992−1994	49	11	0	0	44	—	—
579	Ben Gillies	1992−1996	41	2	0	0	8	—	—
580	Brett Dallas	1992−1995	43	18	0	0	72	AUS	QLD
581	Scott Davey	1992	1	0	0	0	4	—	—
582	Jeremy Moors	1992	1	0	0	0	0	—	—
583	Martin Bella	1993−1994	46	2	0	0	8	—	QLD
584	Jim Dymock	1993−1995	39	14	0	0	56	AUS	—
585	Luke Goodwin	1993−1994	15	3	16	3	47	—	—
586	Jim Serdaris	1993	22	3	0	0	12	—	——
587	Scott Wilson	1993−1994, 1998	34	9	1	0	38	—	—
588	Gary Connolly	1993	15	5	0	0	20	—	—
589	Steven Hughes	1993−2001	70	29	0	0	116	—	—
590	Gavin Whittaker	1993−1995	7	0	0	0	0	—	—
591	Daryl Halligan	1994−2000	166	57	630	2	1490	NZL	—
592	Jason Hetherington	1994−2000	118	13	0	0	52	AUS	QLD
593	Darren Britt	1994−2001	168	10	0	0	40	AUS	—
594	Steve Price	1994−2004	222	16	0	0	64	AUS	QLD
595	John Timu	1995−1997	61	17	5	0	78	NZL	—
596	Darrien Doherty	1995	4	0	0	0	0	—	—
597	Robert Tocco	1995−1998	28	3	0	0	12	—	—
598	Orisi Cavuilati	1995	1	0	0	0	0	FIJ	—
599	James Pickering	1995−1997, 2000	10	1	0	0	4	—	—
600	Peter Wheeler	1995−1996	9	0	0	0	0	—	—
601	Kris Tassell	1995	5	0	0	0	0	—	—
602	Barry Berrigan	1995−1999	24	1	0	0	4	—	—
603	Rod Silva	1995−2001	100	56	0	0	224	—	—
604	Stan Tulevu	1995	3	0	0	0	0	—	—
605	Hazem El Masri	1996−2009	317	159	891	0	2418	LBN→AUS	NSW
606	Damien Ford	1996	12	2	0	0	8	—	—
607	Jason Lidden	1996	13	1	0	0	4	—	—
608	Tony Grimaldi	1996−2006	120	11	0	0	44	—	—
609	Andy Marinos	1996	1	0	0	0	0	—	—
610	Shane Marteene	1996−2003	70	16	0	0	64	—	—
611	Michael Smith	1996−1997	12	2	0	0	8	—	—
612	Brett Clements	1996	7	0	0	0	0	—	—
613	Scott Hill	1996	5	3	0	0	12	–	–
614	Kevin Schraader	1996−1997	3	0	0	0	0	—	—
615	Solomon Haumono	1997−1998	25	7	0	0	28	—	—
616	Travis Norton	1997−2003	117	20	0	0	80	—	QLD
617	Duncan McRae	1997−1998	11	1	0	0	4	—	—
618	Robbie Mears	1997−1998	16	7	0	0	28	—	—
619	Paul Mellor	1997−1998	10	2	0	0	8	—	—
620	Greg Fleming	1998	16	7	0	0	28	—	—
621	Troy Stone	1998−2001	58	2	0	0	8	—	—
622	Gavin Lester	1998−2002	40	13	0	0	52	—	—
623	Matua Parkinson	1998	1	0	0	0	0	—	—
624	Trent Runciman	1998	1	0	0	0	0	—	—
625	Willie Talau	1998−2003	101	38	0	0	152	NZL	—
626	Corey Hughes	1998−2008	213	28	1	1	115	—	—
627	David Thompson	1998−2001	18	4	0	0	16	—	—
628	Bradley Clyde	1999−2001	36	8	0	0	32	–	–
629	Ricky Stuart	1999−2000	40	2	0	2	10	–	–
630	Adam Perry	1999−2007	133	7	0	0	28	—	—
631	Dennis Scott	1999−2004	103	8	0	0	24	—	—
632	Brent Sherwin	1999−2007	191	31	11	9	155	—	—
633	Jamie Feeney	1999−2004	112	24	0	0	96	—	—
634	Adam Peek	1999−2001	23	1	0	0	4	—	—
635	Shane Perry	2000−2001	6	1	0	0	4	—	—
636	Nathan Sologinkin	2000−2002	8	1	0	0	4	—	—
637	Willie Mason	2000−2007	148	36	0	0	144	TON→AUS	NSW
638	Braith Anasta	2000−2005	110	20	2	10	214	AUS	NSW
639	Justin Murphy	2000	1	1	0	0	4	—	—
640	Brett Howland	2001	12	3	0	0	12	—	—
641	Luke Patten	2001−2010	225	82	0	0	328	—	—
642	Nigel Vagana	2001−2003	76	61	0	0	244	NZL	—
643	Paul Rauhihi	2001−2002	40	2	0	0	8	NZL	—
644	Darrell Trindall	2001−2002	21	4	0	0	16	—	—
645	Royce Simms	2001	2	0	0	0	0	—	—
646	Mark O'Meley	2002−2007	110	16	0	0	64	AUS	NSW
647	Ben Harris	2002−2005	42	16	0	0	64	—	—
648	Matt Utai	2002−2009	127	71	0	0	284	NZL	—
649	Glenn Hall	2002−2003	8	3	0	0	12	—	—
650	Todd Polglase	2002−2003	3	1	0	0	4	—	—
651	Johnathan Thurston	2002−2004	29	10	0	0	40	—	—
652	Roy Asotasi	2002−2006	84	8	0	0	32	NZL	—
653	Adam Brideson	2002−2007	22	2	0	0	8	—	—
654	Andrew Ryan	2003−2011	218	52	1	0	210	AUS	NSW
655	Brett Oliver	2003−2005	6	1	0	0	4	—	—
656	Dayne Neirinckx	2003	1	0	0	0	0	—	—
657	Jamahl Lolesi	2004−2005	44	20	0	0	80	NZL	—
658	Willie Tonga	2004−2008	81	37	0	0	148	AUS	QLD
659	Sonny Bill Williams	2004−2008	73	31	0	0	124	NZL	—
660	Hutch Maiava	2004	5	2	0	0	8	—	—
661	Reni Maitua	2004−2008, 2014	113	24	0	0	96	AUS→SAM	—
662	Adrian Rainey	2004	1	0	0	0	0	—	—
663	Trevor Thurling	2004	1	0	0	0	0	—	—
664	Chris Armit	2005−2011	134	8	0	0	32	SCO	—
665	Ben Czislowski	2005−2006	8	0	0	0	0	—	—
666	Nate Myles	2005−2006	39	2	0	0	8	—	QLD
667	Trent Cutler	2005−2006	25	10	0	0	40	—	—
668	Brad Morrin	2005−2010	56	3	0	0	12	—	—
669	Charlie Tonga	2005	10	0	0	0	0	—	—
670	Dallas McIlwain	2005−2007	31	6	0	0	24	—	—
671	Cameron Phelps	2005−2008	39	12	0	0	48	—	—
672	Daniel Conn	2005	3	0	0	0	0	—	—
673	Makasini Richter	2005	2	0	0	0	0	—	—
674	Daniel Irvine	2005−2006	7	0	0	0	0	—	—
675	Luke Young	2005	4	4	0	0	8	—	—
676	Filinga Filiga	2005	2	0	0	0	0	—	—
677	Daniel Holdsworth	2006−2009	70	13	5	2	64	—	—
678	Andrew Emelio	2006−2008	21	9	0	0	36	TON	—
679	Jon Green	2006−2007	7	0	0	0	0	—	—
680	Ben Roberts	2006−2011	93	10	0	1	41	NZL→SAM	—
681	Billy Ngawini	2006	3	0	0	0	0	—	—
682	Jarrad Hickey	2006−2010	72	8	0	0	32	—	—
683	Nick Kouparitsas	2006−2008	34	3	0	0	12	—	—
684	Daryl Millard	2007−2009	48	16	0	0	64	FIJ	—
685	Kane Cleal	2007−2008	19	2	0	0	8	—	—
686	Lee Te Maari	2007−2009	33	2	0	0	8	—	—
687	Tim Winitana	2007−2009	27	10	0	0	40	NZL	—
688	Heka Nanai	2007−2010	22	14	0	0	56	—	—
689	Aaron Wheatley	2007	2	0	0	0	0	—	—
690	Fred Briggs	2007−2008	17	0	0	0	0	—	—
691	Justin Tsoulos	2008	5	0	0	0	0	—	—
692	Michael Sullivan	2008−2009	12	1	0	0	4	—	—
693	Danny Williams	2008−2010	9	1	0	0	4	—	—
694	Gary Warburton	2008−2011	57	3	0	0	12	—	—
695	Brent Crisp	2008	7	2	3	0	14	—	—
696	Lorenzo Ma'afu	2008	2	0	0	0	0	—	—
697	Aaron Groom	2008	6	0	0	0	0	FIJ	—
698	Nick Youngquest	2008	4	1	0	0	4	—	—
699	Charlie Leaeno	2008−2009	8	0	0	0	0	—	—
700	Joe Williams	2008	2	0	0	0	0	—	—
701	Frank Winterstein	2008	5	0	0	0	0	—	—
702	Arana Taumata	2008	5	3	0	0	12	—	—
703	Sione Kite	2008−2009	9	0	0	0	0	—	—
704	Ben Barba	2008−2013	97	72	0	0	288	—	—
705	Reece Blayney	2008	2	0	0	0	0	—	—
706	Jamal Idris	2009−2011	68	24	0	0	96	AUS	NSW
707	Michael Ennis	2009−2014	136	17	2	1	73	—	NSW
708	Bryson Goodwin	2009−2012	68	31	111	0	346	NZL	—
709	Ben Hannant	2009−2010	37	3	0	0	12	AUS	QLD
710	Michael Hodgson	2009−2011	51	3	0	0	12	—	—
711	Brett Kimmorley	2009−2010	46	8	0	3	35	—	NSW
712	Josh Morris	2009−2018	217	103	0	0	412	AUS	NSW
713	David Stagg	2009−2012	94	8	0	0	32	—	—
714	Greg Eastwood	2009−2018	177	15	0	0	60	NZL	—
715	Yileen Gordon	2009−2010	34	0	0	0	0	—	—
716	Steve Turner	2010−2012	53	22	60	0	208	—	—
717	Mickey Paea	2010−2011	28	0	0	0	0	TON	—
718	Blake Green	2010	18	2	0	0	8	—	—
719	Dene Halatau	2010−2013	69	4	0	0	16	—	—
720	Tim Browne	2010−2016	84	2	3	0	14	—	—
721	Martin Taupau	2010−2013	21	1	0	0	4	SAM	—
722	Junior Tia-Kilifi	2010	2	2	0	0	8	—	—
723	Shane Neumann	2010	6	2	0	0	8	—	—
724	Jake Foster	2010−2011	10	0	0	0	0	—	—
725	Joel Romelo	2010−2013	23	4	0	0	16	—	—
726	Ryan Tandy	2010	12	1	0	0	4	—	—
727	Daniel Rauicava	2010	2	0	0	0	0	—	—
728	Corey Payne	2010−2012	43	0	0	0	0	—	—
729	Trent Hodkinson	2011−2015	92	12	179	11	417	—	NSW
730	Sam Kasiano	2011−2015	139	15	0	0	60	NZL→SAM	—
731	Kris Keating	2011−2013	47	7	0	0	28	—	—
732	Frank Pritchard	2011−2015	104	20	0	0	80	NZL→SAM	—
733	Aiden Tolman	2011−2020	222	10	0	0	40	—	—
734	Tim Lafai	2011−2015, 2020	79	32	7	0	142	SAM	—
735	Grant Millington	2011	7	1	0	0	4	—	—
736	Michael Lett	2011	3	2	0	0	8	—	—
737	Josh Reynolds	2011−2017, 2023	145	41	0	5	169	—	NSW
738	Jonathan Wright	2011−2012	38	17	0	0	68	—	—
739	James Graham	2012−2017	135	9	0	0	36	ENG	—
740	Luke MacDougall	2012	2	0	0	0	0	—	—
741	Krisnan Inu	2012−2014	40	16	70	2	206	NZL→SAM	—
742	Dale Finucane	2012−2014	66	2	0	0	8	—	—
743	Brett Lane	2012	1	0	0	0	0	—	—
744	Josh Jackson	2012−2022	241	24	0	0	96	AUS	NSW
745	Sam Perrett	2012−2016	108	48	1	0	194	NZL	—
746	James Gavet	2012	1	0	0	0	0	—	—
747	David Klemmer	2013−2018	113	4	0	0	16	AUS	NSW
748	Drury Low	2013−2014	9	3	0	3	12	COK	—
749	Tony Williams	2013−2016	80	10	0	0	40	—	NSW
750	Mitch Brown	2013−2014	48	22	0	0	88	—	—
751	Harlan Ala'alatoa	2013	1	0	0	0	0	—	—
752	Lachlan Burr	2013	1	0	0	0	0	—	—
753	Pat O'Hanlon	2014	12	0	0	0	0	—	—
754	Chase Stanley	2014−2017	29	10	5	0	50	NZL	—
755	Corey Thompson	2014−2015	35	15	0	0	60	—	—
756	Moses Mbye	2014−2018	94	17	101	2	272	—	—
757	Damien Cook	2014−2015	7	4	0	0	16	—	—
758	Lloyd Perrett	2014−2016	24	0	0	0	0	—	—
759	Michael Lichaa	2015−2019	98	9	0	0	36	LBN	—
760	Brett Morris	2015−2018	68	34	0	0	136	—	NSW
761	Curtis Rona	2015−2016	50	34	0	0	136	—	—
762	Antonio Kaufusi	2015	7	0	0	0	0	—	—
763	Herman Ese'ese	2015	1	0	0	0	0	—	—
764	Danny Fualalo	2015−2019	73	1	0	0	4	—	—
765	Tyrone Phillips	2015−2016	6	4	0	0	16	FIJ	—
766	Shaun Lane	2015	14	5	0	0	20	—	—
767	Adam Elliott	2016−2021	101	10	2	0	44	—	—
768	William Hopoate	2016−2021	124	24	1	0	98	TON	—
769	Craig Garvey	2016−2017	13	2	0	0	8	—	—
770	Kerrod Holland	2016−2020	72	20	80	0	240	—	—
771	Raymond Faitala-Mariner	2016−2023	102	11	0	0	44	SAM→NZL	—
772	Reimis Smith	2016−2020	49	25	0	0	100	—	—
773	Asipeli Fine	2016−2018	11	0	0	0	0	—	—
774	Brenko Lee	2017	18	3	0	0	12	TON	—
775	Brad Abbey	2017	4	1	1	0	6	—	—
776	Marcelo Montoya	2017−2020, 2025–2026	80	28	0	0	112	FIJ	—
777	Matt Frawley	2017−2018	31	6	0	0	24	—	—
778	Francis Tualau	2017−2018	10	0	0	0	0	—	—
779	Andy Saunders	2017	1	0	0	0	0	—	—
780	Kieran Foran	2018−2020	39	8	4	1	41	—	—
781	Aaron Woods	2018	14	0	0	0	0	—	—
782	Jeremy Marshall-King	2018−2022	99	10	0	0	40	—	—
783	Fa'amanu Brown	2018, 2023	17	1	0	0	4	—	—
784	Rhyse Martin	2018−2019	25	4	49	0	114	PNG	—
785	Clay Priest	2018	8	0	0	0	0	—	—
786	Renouf Atoni	2018−2021	43	3	0	0	12	—	—
787	John Olive	2018	3	1	0	0	4	—	—
788	Lachlan Lewis	2018−2021	43	6	0	1	25	—	—
789	Ofahiki Ogden	2018–2021	45	2	0	0	8	—	—
790	Chris Smith	2018−2021	30	2	0	0	8	—	—
791	Christian Crichton	2019−2021	13	3	0	0	12	—	—
792	Corey Harawira-Naera	2019	21	5	0	0	20	—	—
793	Dylan Napa	2019−2021	54	4	0	0	16	—	QLD
794	Sauaso Sue	2019−2020	26	1	0	0	4	—	—
795	Nick Meaney	2019−2021	60	22	59	0	206	—	—
796	Jayden Okunbor	2019−2023	46	15	0	0	60	—	—
797	Jack Cogger	2019−2020	26	3	0	0	12	—	—
798	Dallin Watene-Zelezniak	2019−2021	37	8	0	0	32	NZL	—
799	Brandon Wakeham	2019−2022	25	2	4	0	16	FIJ	—
800	Morgan Harper	2019−2020	2	0	0	0	0	—	—
801	Dean Britt	2020−2021	12	0	0	0	0	—	—
802	Joe Stimson	2020−2022	25	1	0	0	4	—	—
803	Jake Averillo	2020−2023	78	31	39	0	202	—	—
804	Luke Thompson	2020−2023	42	3	0	0	12	ENG	—
805	Sione Katoa	2020−2021	27	0	0	0	0	—	—
806	Matt Doorey	2020−2022	18	3	0	0	12	—	—
807	Tui Katoa	2020−2022	10	2	0	0	8	—	—
808	Corey Allan	2021−2022	21	3	0	0	12	—	—
809	Nick Cotric	2021	14	3	0	0	12	—	—
810	Bradley Deitz	2021	7	0	0	0	0	—	—
811	Kyle Flanagan	2021–2023	50	7	29	0	86	—	—
812	Jack Hetherington	2021−2022	20	1	0	0	4	—	—
813	Corey Waddell	2021–2023	59	5	0	0	20	—	—
814	Jackson Topine	2021−2023	16	1	0	0	4	—	—
815	Ava Seumanufagai	2021−2022	23	0	0	0	0	—	—
816	Aaron Schoupp	2021−2022	32	9	0	0	36	—	—
817	Bailey Biondi-Odo	2021−2024	17	2	0	0	8	—	—
818	Falakiko Manu	2021	4	0	0	0	0	—	—
819	Chris Patolo	2021−2024	27	0	0	0	0	—	—
820	Corey Horsburgh	2021	2	0	0	0	0	—	—
821	Ryan James	2021	2	1	0	0	4	—	—
822	Josh Addo-Carr	2022−2024	52	38	0	0	152	AUS	NSW
823	Braidon Burns	2022−2023	22	6	0	0	24	—	—
824	Matt Burton	2022−	114	34	236	6	616	AUS	NSW
825	Matthew Dufty	2022	12	1	0	0	4	—	—
826	Max King	2022−	109	4	0	0	16	ENG	NSW
827	Brent Naden	2022	8	1	0	0	4	—	—
828	Paul Vaughan	2022	24	1	0	0	4	—	—
829	Tevita Pangai Junior	2022−2023	36	1	0	0	4	TON	NSW
830	Jacob Kiraz	2022−	98	44	0	0	176	LBN	—
831	Billy Tsikrikas	2022	2	0	0	0	0	GRE	—
832	Zach Dockar-Clay	2022	14	1	0	0	4	—	—
833	Kurtis Morrin	2022−2025	46	4	0	0	16	—	—
834	Declan Casey	2022−2023	6	2	0	0	8	—	—
835	Harrison Edwards	2022−2024	17	1	0	0	4	—	—
836	Josh Stuckey	2022	1	0	0	0	0	—	—
837	Paul Alamoti	2023	19	2	1	0	10	—	—
838	Viliame Kikau	2023−	69	14	0	0	56	FIJ	—
839	Reed Mahoney	2023−2025	74	11	0	0	44	—	—
840	Franklin Pele	2023	6	0	0	0	0	—	—
841	Hayze Perham	2023−2024	19	3	0	0	12	—	—
842	Jacob Preston	2023−	80	31	0	0	124	AUS	—
843	Ryan Sutton	2023	13	0	0	0	0	—	—
844	Jayden Tanner	2023	3	0	0	0	0	—	—
845	Samuel Hughes	2023−	48	5	0	0	20	—	—
846	Andrew Davey	2023	2	0	0	0	0	—	—
847	Karl Oloapu	2023	7	0	0	0	0	—	—
848	Blake Wilson	2023–2025	27	12	0	0	48	—	—
849	Khaled Rajab	2023–2024	4	0	0	0	0	—	—
850	Ethan Quai-Ward	2023	1	1	0	0	4	—	—
851	Toby Sexton	2023–2025	41	6	9	0	42	—	—
852	Jeral Skelton	2023–2024	8	4	0	0	16	SAM	—
853	Liam Knight	2023–2024	7	1	0	0	4	—	—
854	Stephen Crichton	2024–	58	20	110	2	302	SAM	NSW
855	Joshua Curran	2024–2026	61	13	0	0	52	—	—
856	Poasa Faamausili	2024–	4	0	0	0	0	—	—
857	Drew Hutchison	2024–2025	13	0	0	0	0	—	—
858	Kurt Mann	2024–2026	57	4	0	0	16	—	QLD
859	Jaeman Salmon	2024–	64	8	0	0	32	—	—
860	Blake Taaffe	2024–2025	12	2	0	0	8	—	—
861	Connor Tracey	2024–	68	15	0	0	60	—	—
862	Kitione Kautoga	2024	2	0	0	0	0	FIJ	—
863	Bronson Xerri	2024–2026	59	22	0	0	88	—	—
864	Bailey Hayward	2024–	70	2	0	0	8	SCO	—
865	Jake Turpin	2024–2026	14	0	0	0	0	—	—
866	Lipoi Hopoi	2024–2026	17	1	0	0	4	—	—
867	Harry Hayes	2024–	53	2	0	0	8	—	—
868	Eli Clark	2024	1	0	0	0	0	—	—
869	Jonathan Sua	2024–2026	7	1	0	0	4	—	—
870	Daniel Suluka-Fifita	2025–2026	11	1	0	0	4	—	—
871	Sitili Tupouniua	2025–	27	6	0	0	24	—	—
872	Jack Todd	2025–	4	1	0	0	4	—	—
873	Luke Smith	2025	2	0	0	0	0	—	—
874	Lachlan Galvin	2025–	38	14	0	0	56	—	—
875	Enari Tuala	2025–	28	10	0	0	40	SAM	—
876	Jethro Rinakama	2025–	16	10	0	0	40	FIJ	—
877	Sean O'Sullivan	2026–	6	0	0	0	0	—	—
878	Leo Thompson	2026–	19	0	0	0	0	NZL	—
879	Alekolasimi Jones	2026–	6	0	0	0	0	—	—
880	Jack Underhill	2026–	7	0	0	0	0	—	—
881	Jed Reardon	2026–	2	0	0	0	0	—	—
882	Gordon Chan Kum Tong	2026–	1	0	0	0	0	—	—
883	Cooper Toy	2026–	1	0	0	0	0	—	—
No.	Name	Career	Appearances	Tries	Goals	FGs	Points	Country	State
Club								Representative	

== First Grade Captains (since 1955) ==
First Grade Captains (since 1955)
Captain	Career
(Australia) Ray Gartner	1955
(Australia) Col Geelan	1956–57
(Australia) Ray Gartner	1958–59
(Australia) Brian Davies	1959–61
(Australia) Ray Beavan	1962
(Australia) Ray Gartner	1962–64
(Australia) Les Johns	1964–65
(Australia) George Taylforth	1966
(Australia) Kevin Ryan	1967–69
(Australia) Ron Raper	1970–71
(Australia) Johnny Greaves	1971–72
(Australia) Geoff Connell	1973
(Australia) John McDonell	1974
(Australia) Tim Pickup	1975
(Australia) Bob McCarthy	1976–77
(Australia) George Peponis	1978–82
(Australia) Chris Anderson	1982–84
(Australia) Steve Mortimer	1984–88
(Australia) Peter Tunks	1988–89
(Australia) Terry Lamb	1990–95
(Australia) Simon Gillies	1996–98
(Australia) Darren Britt	1998–01
(Australia) Steve Price	2002–04
(Australia) Andrew Ryan	2004–11
(Australia) Michael Ennis	2012–13
(Australia) Michael Ennis (Australia) Frank Pritchard (co-captains)	2014
(England) James Graham	2015–17
(Australia) Josh Jackson	2018–22
(Samoa) Raymond Faitala-Mariner (Club captain) (Australia) Matt Burton (Australia) Reed Mahoney (Game day co-captains)	2023
(Samoa) Stephen Crichton	2024–present

== Women's team ==
Canterbury-Bankstown were admitted into the NRL Women's Premiership competition to begin play in the 2025 NRL Women's season.

Updated to round 10 of the 2026 NRL Women's season.
Players listed in cap order as allocated by the club

Cap No.	Name	Nationality	Bulldogs Career	Debut Round	Previous club (Note: Player's last NRL Women's club prior to joining the Bulldogs.)	Position	Appearances	Tries	Goals	Field goals	Points
1.	Tayla Preston	(Australia) (Wales)	2025–present	Rd. 1	Cronulla-Sutherland Sharks	Halfback, Five-eighth	21	1	36	0	76
2.	Angelina Teakaraanga-Katoa	(New Zealand)	2025–present	Rd. 1	St. George Illawarra Dragons	Prop, Lock	20	2	0	0	8
3.	Adi Vani Buleki	(Fiji)	2025–present	Rd. 1	Debut	Wing	6	1	0	0	4
4.	Moana Courtenay	(New Zealand)	2025–present	Rd. 1	Debut	Centre	12	3	0	0	12
5.	Teagan Dymock	(Tonga)	2025	Rd. 1	Cronulla-Sutherland Sharks	Prop, Lock	5	0	0	0	0
6.	Bridget Hoy	(Australia)	2025–present	Rd. 1	Brisbane Broncos	Wing, Fullback	7	1	0	0	4
7.	Simina Lokotui	(New Zealand) (Tonga)	2025–present	Rd. 1	Debut	Centre	16	10	0	0	40
8.	Ebony Prior	(Australia)	2025–present	Rd. 1	Wests Tigers	Hooker	13	1	0	0	4
9.	Ashleigh Quinlan	(New Zealand)	2025–present	Rd. 1	Canberra Raiders	Five-eighth, Halfback	19	3	0	0	12
10.	Andie Robinson	(Australia)	2025–present	Rd. 1	Cronulla-Sutherland Sharks	Fullback, Wing	21	5	0	0	20
11.	Latisha Smythe	(Fiji)	2025–present	Rd. 1	Debut	Second-row, Lock	15	0	0	0	0
12.	Alexis Tauaneai	(New Zealand)	2025–present	Rd. 1	St. George Illawarra Dragons	Second-row, Lock	18	5	0	0	20
13.	Holli Wheeler	(Australia)	2025	Rd. 1	Cronulla-Sutherland Sharks	Lock, Prop	9	0	0	0	0
14.	Kalosipani Hopoate	(Tonga)	2025–present	Rd. 1	Sydney Roosters	Prop	18	1	0	0	4
15.	Shaquaylah Mahakitau-Monschau	(New Zealand)	2025–present	Rd. 1	Debut	Halfback, Hooker	4	0	0	0	0
16.	Shaniece Monschau	(New Zealand)	2025	Rd. 1	Debut	Prop, Second-row	11	0	0	0	0
17.	Shannon Muru	(New Zealand) (Tonga)	2025–present	Rd. 1	Parramatta Eels	Second-row	10	1	0	0	4
18.	Hope Millard	(England) (Australia)	2025–present	Rd. 3	Debut	Prop	16	2	0	0	8
19.	Monica Tagoai	(Samoa) (New Zealand)	2025–present	Rd. 3	Debut	Centre	17	11	0	0	44
20.	Paea Uilou	(New Zealand) (Tonga)	2025–present	Rd. 3	Debut	Prop	8	0	0	0	0
21.	Anneka Wilson	(Australia)	2025–present	Rd. 3	Debut	Halfback, Hooker	9	0	0	0	0
22.	Elizabeth MacGregor	(Australia)	2025–present	Rd. 4	Debut	Fullback, Centre	16	10	0	0	40
23.	Pauline Suli-Ruka	(Australia) (Tonga)	2025–present	Rd. 5	Debut	Centre, Second-row	8	0	0	0	0
24.	Ma'atuleio Fotu-Moala	(Tonga)	2025–present	Rd. 8	Debut	Prop	8	2	0	0	8
25.	Tamika Jones	(Australia) (Fiji)	2026–present	Rd. 1	Debut	Second-row	8	1	0	0	4
26.	Daynah Nankivell	(New Zealand)	2026–present	Rd. 1	Debut	Centre, Wing	9	1	0	0	4
27.	Leilani Wilson	(Australia) (Samoa)	2026–present	Rd. 1	Debut	Lock, Second-row	10	0	0	0	0
28.	Giovanna Suani	(New Zealand)	2026–present	Rd. 1	Debut	Prop	5	0	0	0	0
29.	Mary-Jane Taito	(New Zealand) (Samoa)	2026–present	Rd. 1	Debut	Hooker	10	0	0	0	0
30.	Evelyn Roberts	(New Zealand) (Samoa)	2026–present	Rd. 2	Debut	Hooker	8	2	0	0	8

=== Inaugural NRL Women's squad ===
The Bulldogs first NRL match was against the Newcastle Knights on 4 July 2025 at Accor Stadium.

Canterbury-Bankstown Bulldogs Inaugural NRL Women's team
Starting team	Interchange	Coaching staff
1 Andie Robinson – FB; 2 Bridget Hoy – WG; 3 Simina Lokotui – CE; 4 Moana Courtenay – CE; 5 Adi Vani Buleki – WG; 6 Ashleigh Quinlan – FE; 7 Tayla Preston (c) – HB; 8 Angelina Teakaraanga-Katoa (c) – PR; 14 Shaquaylah Mahakitau-Monschau – HK; 10 Tegan Dymock – PR; 11 Alexis Tauaneai – SR; 12 Latisha Smythe – SR; 13 Holli Wheeler – LK	9 Ebony Prior – HK; 15 Shaniece Monschau – PR; 16 Shannon Muru – SR; 17 Kalosipani Hopoate – PR; Reserve: 18 Hope Millard – PR	Head coach: Brayden Wiliame; Legend: (c) Captain(s); (vc) Vice-captain(s); Updated: 4 July 2025; Source(s):
