= Crumpton (surname) =

Crumpton is a surname. Notable people with the name include:

- Abby Crumpton (born 1981), American soccer player
- Alan Crumpton (1928–1983), Australian rugby league footballer
- Henry A. Crumpton (born 1957), American CIA operations officer
- Jermaine Crumpton (born 1994), American basketball player
- John Crumpton Hardy (1864–1938), President of the Mississippi Agricultural and Mechanical College
- Lesia L. Crumpton-Young, American engineer and academic administrator
- Max Crumpton (born 1993), English rugby union player
- Michael Joseph Crumpton CBE, FRS (born 1929), Director of Research for the Imperial Cancer Research Fund Laboratories, London
- Nathan Crumpton (born 1985), Olympic athlete in skeleton and athletics
- Nick Crumpton (born 1986), British zoologist and children's author

== See also ==
- Crump (surname)
- Crompton (surname)
- Crampton (surname)
- Compton (surname)
- 32150 Crumpton, minor planet
