= Petley =

Petley may refer to:

== People with the family name ==
- Bill Petley (1935–2024), Australian rugby league player
- Frank Petley (1872–1945), British silent actor.
- Roy Petley (born 1950), British painter.
- Petley (1802 cricketer), a British cricket player.

== People with the given name ==
- Petley Price (1856-1910), British rugby player.

== Place ==
- Petley, Newfoundland and Labrador, a village in Canada.
