= Troy Cassell =

Australian rugby league player

Personal information
- Full name: Troy Cassell
- Born: 10 November 1970 (age 54); Camperdown, New South Wales, Australia
- Height: 193 cm (6 ft 4 in)
- Weight: 108 kg (238 lb; 17 st 0 lb)

Playing information
- Position: Prop
Club
| Years | Team | Pld | T | G | FG | P |
|---|---|---|---|---|---|---|
| 1991–92 | Canterbury Bulldogs | 24 | 2 | 0 | 0 | 8 |
| 1993–94 | Penrith Panthers | 13 | 1 | 0 | 0 | 4 |
| | Total | 37 | 3 | 0 | 0 | 12 |

Troy Cassell (born 10 November 1970) is an Australian former rugby league footballer who played in the 1990s. He played for the Canterbury Bulldogs and the Penrith Panthers. His position of choice was prop.

== Playing career ==
Cassell was a St. Marys junior. In 1990, he joined the Canterbury Bulldogs. He was a regular member of the under 21 team and played in the preliminary semi-final against the Parramatta Eels as a replacement. In 1991, Cassell became a regular member of the reserve grade team and was used regularly as a replacement forward for first grade. Cassell made his first grade debut in his side's 30−18 victory over the Balmain Tigers at Leichhardt Oval in round 1 of the 1991 season. He made 17 appearances for the Bulldogs in his rookie season including the play-off for fifth against the Western Suburbs Magpies in which he played as a replacement. In 1992, Cassell started the season late due to injury and was briefly promoted to first grade for Mitch Newton.

In 1993, Cassell started the season in reserve grade, but joined the Penrith Panthers mid-season where he played 13 games from 1993 to 1994. Cassell was released by the Panthers at the end of the 1994 season, and subsequently never played first grade rugby league again. In total, Cassell played 37 first grade games and scored 3 tries.
