= Brent Sherwin =

Australian rugby league footballer

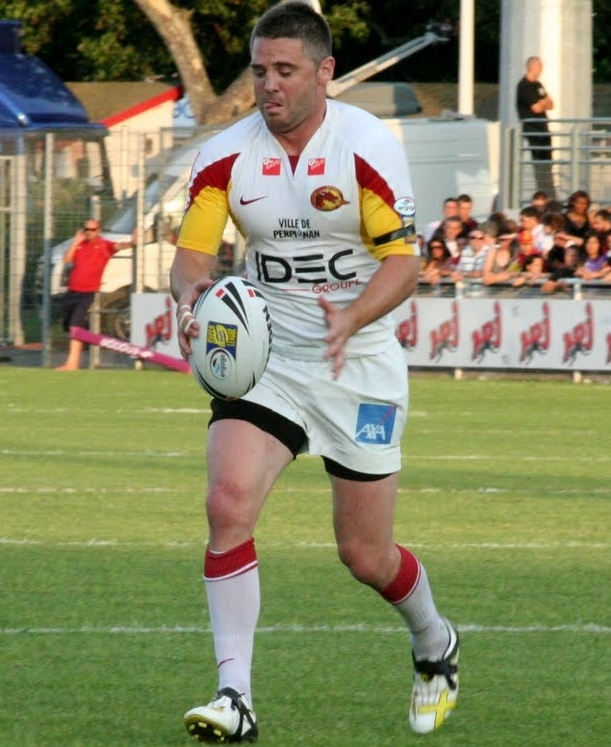

Personal information
- Full name: Brent Matthew Sherwin
- Born: 20 March 1978 (age 48) Sydney, New South Wales, Australia

Playing information
- Height: 5 ft 9 in (1.75 m)
- Weight: 13 st 7 lb (86 kg)
- Position: Halfback, Five-eighth
Club
Years	Team	Pld	T	G	FG	P
1999–07	Canterbury Bulldogs	191	31	11	9	155
2008–10	Castleford Tigers	52	5	2	1	26
2010	Catalans Dragons	14	1	0	1	5
	Total	257	37	13	11	186
Representative
Years	Team	Pld	T	G	FG	P
2003–05	City Origin	3	0	0	1	1

Brent Sherwin (born 20 March 1978) is an Australian former professional rugby league footballer. Bearing the iconic nickname "Shifty", Sherwin plays in the Illawarra Carlton League which is an indirect feeder league to the St George Illawarra Dragons. He plays as a half-back. Sherwin previously played for the Catalans Dragons, Castleford Tigers, the Canterbury-Bankstown Bulldogs and has also been represented for City Origin.

Sherwin played for Canterbury-Bankstown from 1999 to 2007. He was almost successful in obtaining the Dally M Award in 2002 but was narrowly beaten by Andrew Johns.

While he occasionally was demoted for poor form, Sherwin played a vital role in Canterbury's 2002 17-game winning streak and the 2004 premiership win. A handy goalkicker, Sherwin was the top grade half from 2002 to 2007.

== Background ==
Sherwin was born in Greenacre, New South Wales, Sydney of English descent.

== Canterbury-Bankstown (1996–2007) ==
Sherwin joined Canterbury as a five-eighth with pinpoint goal kicking. He was a regular member for the under 19's squad and played in the Preliminary Final against the Penrith Panthers which they lost.

In 1998, Sherwin was playing on the wing for the reserve side. He broke the club's record for most points scored in a reserve team for a season with 170 points. He played in the eventual premiership victory over Parramatta.

In 1999, he started playing half-back for the reserve side. Due to the injury of Ricky Stuart, Sherwin got his first opportunity in first grade football.

In 2000, Sherwin became a regular member of the Canterbury-Bankstown squad, playing at five-eighth.

In 2001, Brent continued his success in the top grade, mainly playing off the bench. Due to injury, Sherwin was unable to play in the Semi Final against St. George Illawarra.

In 2002, he had a great season as he became the regular half back for the Canterbury Side, and got his first taste of representative football, As he was selected to play for City Origin.

In 2003, he was again a regular member of the team. He played in the Preliminary Final, But lost against eventual runners-up the Sydney Roosters.

Sherwin played halfback for Canterbury in their 2004 NRL grand final victory over cross-city rivals, the Sydney Roosters.

In 2005, Sherwin's season was cut short due to a season-ending injury.

In 2006, he came back with great form and played in the Preliminary Final which they lost to eventual premiers the Brisbane Broncos.

In 2007, Sherwin started the season in the lower grades, but early in the season returned to top grade and played for the remainder of the season. He played in the elimination final against arch-rivals the Parramatta Eels, but Canterbury went down 25-6 ending their season, which would also turn out to be his last game playing for the club.

== Castleford Tigers (2007–2010) ==
On 8 November 2007, Canterbury-Bankstown announced that Sherwin had been released from the remainder of his contract. Sherwin signed with the English club, Castleford Tigers, on a three-year contract with the English club.

He played 21 times for Castleford in 2008, serving as co-captain alongside Awen Guttenbeil. He suffered niggling injuries through the campaign and the tigers fans were never able to see his best ability. He was hoping for full fitness for 2009 and a strong campaign where he would link up in the halves with Rangi Chase.

He started the 2009 season in great form before suffering injury again where he missed 11 games. He has returned for the final 3 games where Cas were hoping to achieve a play off place.

== Catalans Dragons 2010 ==
He signed for the Catalans Dragons for the remainder of the 2010 season in a shock switch from Castleford.

== Later years ==
Sherwin returned to Australia in 2011, playing in the Illawarra Carlton League which is an indirect feeder league to the St George Illawarra Dragons.

He was appointed assistant coach for the Camden Rams in 2013 in the Group 6 Rugby League competition, working under former Bulldogs teammate Mitch Newton.
