= Rangi Joass =

Australian rugby league footballer

Personal information
- Full name: William Joass
- Born: 6 September 1889 Waterloo, New South Wales, Australia
- Died: 8 July 1964 (aged 74) Sydney, New South Wales, Australia

Playing information
- Position: Second-row, Prop, Hooker
Club
Years	Team	Pld	T	G	FG	P
1911–22	Western Suburbs Magpies	138	13	1	0	41
Representative
Years	Team	Pld	T	G	FG	P
1911–19	New South Wales	4	1	0	0	3
1911–12	Metropolis	3	0	0	0	0
- Relatives: Bill Joass (son)

William Joass (1889–1964) nicknamed "Rangi" was an Australian rugby league footballer who played in the 1910s and 1920s. He played for Western Suburbs in the NSWRL competition.

== Playing career ==
Joass made his first grade debut for Western Suburbs in Round 2 1911 against Newtown. In the same year, Joass was selected to play for New South Wales and scored a try on his representative debut against Queensland which ended in The Blues winning 49–0. Joass was also selected to play for Metropolis in 1911.

Joass remained a loyal player to Wests even though the club remained towards the bottom of the ladder. Joass was part of 4 wooden spoon sides in 1912, 1913, 1915, and 1916.

In 1918, Joass played 14 games as Western Suburbs finished as runners up. In 1919, Joass earned his last representative call up when he was selected to play for New South Wales.

Joass went on to play with Western Suburbs until the end of 1922 before retiring and was one of the club's longest serving players. He died at his home in Sydney on 8 July 1964, 60 days short of his 75th birthday.
