= John Peek =

Australian rugby league footballer (born 1952)

Personal information
- Full name: John Peek
- Born: 22 April 1952 (age 74) Lakemba, New South Wales, Australia

Playing information
- Position: Lock
Club
Years	Team	Pld	T	G	FG	P
1972–77	Canterbury-Bankstown	92	24	0	0	72
1978–81	South Sydney	60	13	0	0	39
	Total	152	37	0	0	111
- Relatives: Adam Peek (son)

John Peek (born 22 April 1952) is an Australian former professional rugby league footballer who played in the 1970s and 1980s. He played for Canterbury-Bankstown and South Sydney as a lock.

== Playing career ==
A Lakemba United junior, Peek made his debut for Canterbury-Bankstown (first grade player number #386) in 1972 against Balmain. In 1974, Peek played for Canterbury in the 1974 grand final defeat against Eastern Suburbs.

Along with team mate Chris Anderson, Peek joined English club Widnes for the 1974–75 season, and played for the club in their defeat to Bradford Northern in the 1974–75 Player's No.6 Trophy final.

The following year, Peek captained Canterbury for a few games but by 1976 was demoted to reserve grade. In 1978, Peek joined South Sydney (first grade player number #639) and spent four seasons at the club before retiring at the end of 1981. Peek is the father of former rugby league journeyman Adam Peek.
