= Chris Doyle (rugby league) =

Australian rugby league footballer

Personal information
- Full name: Christopher Doyle
- Born: 2 May 1958 (age 66); Sydney, New South Wales, Australia

Playing information
- Position: Second-row, Lock, Centre, Wing
Club
| Years | Team | Pld | T | G | FG | P |
|---|---|---|---|---|---|---|
| 1976–83 | Newtown Jets | 66 | 14 | 0 | 0 | 43 |
| 1985–86 | Canterbury Bulldogs | 3 | 0 | 0 | 0 | 0 |
| | Total | 69 | 14 | 0 | 0 | 43 |
- Source: As of 4 June 2019

Chris Doyle is an Australian former rugby league footballer who played in the 1970s and 1980s. He played for the Newtown Jets and Canterbury-Bankstown in the New South Wales Rugby League (NSWRL) competition.

== Playing career ==
Doyle made his first grade debut for Newtown in 1976. At the end of 1976, Newtown claimed the wooden spoon after finishing last on the table. Newtown would subsequently finish last in 1977 and 1978. In 1979, Newtown appointed Warren Ryan as new head coach. Ryan took Newtown from being a struggling outfit to being premiership contenders by 1981. Newtown would eventually reach the 1981 NSWRL grand final against Parramatta but Doyle missed the match due to injury. Newtown would go on to be defeated 20–11 at the Sydney Cricket Ground.

Doyle played 13 games for Newtown in 1983 which would prove to be the club's last in the top grade of Australian rugby league. Doyle played in Newtown's final ever match in the NSWRL premiership, which was a 9–6 victory over the Canberra Raiders at Campbelltown Stadium.

In 1985, Doyle joined Canterbury-Bankstown after Newtown were evicted from the premiership due to financial reasons in 1984. Doyle made 3 appearances for Canterbury-Bankstown over 2 seasons as he mainly played for their reserve grade team. At the end of 1986, Doyle was released by Canterbury after playing a total of 28 games for the side across all grades.
