= Ron Thornton (rugby league) =

Australian rugby league footballer (1932–2024)

Personal information
- Full name: Ronald Francis Thornton
- Born: 21 June 1932 Bellingen, New South Wales, Australia
- Died: 30 September 2024 (aged 92)

Playing information
- Position: Halfback, Five-eighth
Club
Years	Team	Pld	T	G	FG	P
1955–61	Canterbury-Bankstown	103	15	1	0	47
- Source: As of 9 July 2019

Ron Thornton (21 June 1932 – 30 September 2024) was an Australian professional rugby league footballer who played in the 1950s and 1960s. He played for Canterbury-Bankstown in the New South Wales Rugby League (NSWRL) competition.

== Playing career ==
Thornton made his first grade debut for Canterbury-Bankstown against Newtown in Round 16 1955 at Belmore Oval. Canterbury would go on to finish the 1955 season in second last place just above Western Suburbs. Thornton would go on to become a regular starter in the Canterbury side over the coming seasons as the club continued to struggle towards the bottom of the ladder. Canterbury managed to avoid the wooden spoon partly in thanks to rivals Parramatta.

In 1960, Canterbury qualified reached the finals for the first time in many years and Thornton played in the club's semi final defeat against Eastern Suburbs. Thornton retired at the end of the 1961 season.

Thorton played a total of 116 games for the club across all grades. In 2004, he was nominated for the Berries to Bulldogs 70 Year Team of Champions.

Thornton died on 30 September 2024, at the age of 92.
