= Scott Davey =

Australian rugby league footballer

Personal information
- Full name: Scott Davey
- Born: 11 January 1972 (age 54) Canterbury, New South Wales, Australia

Playing information
- Position: Wing, Centre
Club
Years	Team	Pld	T	G	FG	P
1992–95	Canterbury Bulldogs	4	1	0	0	4
1996	Parramatta Eels	4	1	0	0	4
	Total	8	2	0	0	8
- Source: As of 14 February 2023

Scott Davey is an Australian former professional rugby league footballer who played in the 1990s. He played for Canterbury-Bankstown and Parramatta in the New South Wales Rugby League (NSWRL) and ARL competitions.

== Playing career ==
Davey made his first grade debut for Canterbury in round 14 of the 1992 NSWRL season against Newcastle at Belmore Sports Ground. In 1995, Davey was a squad member at Canterbury when they won the premiership that season defeating Manly in the grand final. The club were briefly known in 1995 as the "Sydney Bulldogs". In 1996, Davey signed for the clubs arch-rivals Parramatta where he played four games.
