= Jim Collins (rugby league) =

Australian rugby league footballer (1923– 1996)

Personal information
- Born: James Thomas Collins; 27 June 1923 Sydney, New South Wales
- Died: 16 October 1996 (aged 73) Cronulla, New South Wales

Playing information
- Position: Five-eighth, Halfback
Club
Years	Team	Pld	T	G	FG	P
1944–47, 1949–51	Canterbury-Bankstown	77	19	4	0	65

James Thomas Collins (27 June 1923 – 16 October 1996) was an Australian professional rugby league footballer, who played for Canterbury-Bankstown of the New South Wales Rugby League Premiership. He played seven seasons playing interchangeably between five-eighth and half-back.

== Playing career ==
Collins made his debut in the NSWRL with Canterbury-Bankstown against Western Suburbs in round 3 of the 1944 season. He was moved to the half-back position and scored the first try of his career in Canterbury's 25–18 win over Eastern Suburbs in round 6. In Round 10, he scored his second try of the season in a 13–13 draw against Balmain. He played 12 games in 1944, including a representative appearance with Metropolis Seconds against Army Seconds.

In 1945, Collins scored a try in round 4 against South Sydney (who would win only 1 game in the season). He scored another try 7 rounds later (also against Souths) and finished the season with 2 tries in 9 appearances.

Collins had a strong 1946 season. He scored 3 tries in the first half of the season, before scoring a try in three consecutive games in rounds 11, 13 and 14. Collins' performances helped Canterbury make the finals for the first time in 4 years. Collins played in the club's 12–10 win over Newtown in the semi-finals, although the club lost to Balmain 7–8 in the Preliminary finals.

In 1947, Collins only played three games. It was another successful season for the club who finished as minor premiers. They however, lost to Balmain in the final 19–25, and as minor premiers, used their "right of challenge" for a rematch game. Balmain would win that game 13–9 to collect their 10th premiership. Collins did not appear in any of Canterbury's finals games.

Collins would not make another first grade appearance until the opening round of the 1949 season - where he scored a try in Canterbury's draw to South Sydney. He also scored a try in the following round against Wests. He scored his third try of the season against Manly-Warringah - who were still a new club at the time. Towards the end of the season, Collins experienced success when he scored two tries in the remaining two rounds of 1949 in losses to Newtown and Manly sequentially. He finished the season with 5 tries in 14 appearances.

Canterbury had a relatively successful 1950 campaign, though narrowly missed the finals. He scored a try in round 8 against Parramatta, in a round 16 loss to Balmain and a try in the final round of the season against Newtown. Collins played thirteen games in 1950.

In 1951, Collins scored his last career try in a win against Easts. This season, he was handed some of Canterbury's goal-kicking duties. He scored two goals in a round 9 loss to Wests and kicked two goals in a double-digit loss to Parramatta. In Round 15, he played the final game of his career in a 22–6 loss to Easts. He concluded his career with 19 tries and 4 goals (65 points) in 77 appearances.

== Personal life ==
Collins was born in Sydney on 27 June 1923. He died in Cronulla on 16 October 1996, at the age of 73.
