= Darren Currie (rugby league) =

Australian rugby league footballer

Personal information
- Full name: Darren Currie
- Born: 4 September 1968 (age 56)

Playing information
- Position: Centre
Club
Years	Team	Pld	T	G	FG	P
1986–88	Penrith Panthers	11	2	0	0	8
1989	Canterbury Bulldogs	13	3	0	0	12
1990–91	Illawarra Steelers	15	3	2	2	18
	Total	39	8	2	2	38
- Source: As of 20 February 2024

Darren Currie is an Australian former professional rugby league footballer who played in the 1980s and 1990s. He played for Canterbury-Bankstown, Penrith and Illawarra in the NSWRL competition.

== Playing career ==
Currie made his first grade debut for Penrith in round 19 of the 1986 NSWRL season against Canberra at Penrith Stadium. In 1989, Currie joined the defending premiers Canterbury and played 13 matches for the club in his one and only season there. Currie then joined Illawarra in 1990 and played with the Wollongong-based club for two years.
