= Nick Crumpton =

British zoologist and children's author

- Born: 12 April 1986, Bromsgrove, England
- Education: University of Cambridge University of Bristol University of Leeds
- Scientific career
- Fields: Functional Anatomy Mammalian Evolution Palaeobiology
- Thesis: Osteological correlates of sensory systems in small mammals
- Website: www.nickcrumpton.com

Nick Crumpton (born 1986) is a British zoologist and children's author.

== Education and research career ==
Crumpton holds a BSc in ecology from the University of Leeds, and an MSc in palaeobiology from the University of Bristol, for which he was awarded the Geologists Association's Curry Prize. He gained his PhD from the University of Cambridge with research undertaken at the Department of Zoology.

He has held post-doctoral research posts at the Zoological Society of London and University College London and undertaken field work in Indonesia and North America. His research has centered on ecomorphology and functional anatomy, convergent evolution, mammalian evolution during the Mesozoic era, and recent mammal biodiversity in the Caribbean and Indonesia. He has helped describe three species of mammals new to science. He has sat on the council of the Systematics Association and is a Fellow of the Linnean Society.

== Books ==
Crumpton's first non-fiction book for children, Triassic Terrors, illustrated by Isaac Lenkiewicz, was published by Flying Eye Books in 2012 and introduced readers to less commonly known non-dinosaur animals from the Triassic period. Since then, he has authored a range of non-fiction and narrative non-fiction books for children about animals both alive and extinct, evolution, and debunking commonly believed myths about life on Earth. His books have been translated into more than 15 languages.

== Media and public engagement ==
Crumpton was awarded a British Science Association Media Fellowship in 2012 and spent this time at the BBC Radio Science Unit and the Science and Environment news website and has made film and radio segments for the BBC. He has acted as scientific consultant on natural history television series, BBC Bitesize online games and publishers including Ladybird, Lonely Planet and Phaidon. He has also appeared on BBC and CBBC television programmes, BBC Radio, the Naked Scientists podcast, and has written for the Guardian newspaper. He has spoken at the Cambridge Science Festival, the Hay Festival of Literature & Arts and the Bath Children's Literature Festival and worked as a professional science communicator at the Natural History Museum, London.

== Select publications ==
- Crumpton, N. 2024. Brown Bears. Walker.
- Bronner, G. N., Mynhardt, S., Bennett, N. C., Cohen, L., Crumpton, N., Hofreiter, M., Arnold, P., Asher, R. J., 2024. "Phylogenetic history of golden moles and tenrecs (Mammalia: Afrotheria)", Zoological Journal of the Linnean Society, 201(1), 184-213.
- Crumpton, N. 2023. How to Chat Chicken, Gossip Gorilla, Babble Bee, Gab Gecko and Talk in 66 Other Animal Languages. What on Earth Books.
- Crumpton, N. 2023. Everything You Know About Sharks is Wrong!. Nosy Crow.
- Crumpton, N. 2022. Animal Super Powers: The Most Amazing Ways Animals Have Evolved. Walker Studios.
- Turvey, S. T., Crees, J. J., Hansford, J., Jeffree, T. E., Crumpton N., Kurniawan, I., Setiyabudi, E., Guillerme, T., Paranggarimu, U., Dosseto, A. and Van Den Ber, G. D. 2017. "Quaternary vertebrate faunas from Sumba, Indonesia: implications for Wallacean biogeography and evolution", Proceedings of the Royal Society B: Biological Sciences, 284, 1861.
- Crumpton, N., Kardjilov, N. and Asher, R. J. 2015. "Convergence vs. specialization in the ear region of moles (Mammalia)", Journal of morphology, 276(8), 900-914.
