= Phil Charlton =

Australian rugby league footballer (1950-2021)

Personal information
- Full name: Philip John Charlton
- Born: 17 November 1950
- Died: 21 February 2021 (aged 70)

Playing information
- Position: Prop, Second-row
Club
Years	Team	Pld	T	G	FG	P
1972–78	Canterbury-Bankstown	68	0	0	0	0
1979	Newtown	1	0	0	0	0
	Total	69	0	0	0	0
- Source: As of 7 February 2024
- Father: Ken Charlton
- Relatives: Neville Charlton (uncle)

Phil Charlton (1950-2021) was an Australian professional rugby league footballer who played in the 1970s. He played for Canterbury-Bankstown and Newtown in the NSWRL competition.

== Playing career ==
Charlton made his first grade debut for Canterbury in round 6 against arch-rivals Parramatta at Cumberland Oval with Canterbury winning 11–5. Charlton played a total of eight seasons at Canterbury and was used infrequently in the first grade team. However he did play in numerous finals campaigns for the club. In 1974, he played in both finals matches as Canterbury reached the grand final that season however he was not selected in the grand final team. He later featured in the 1975 and 1976 finals campaigns. In 1976, he played in Canterbury's narrow loss to Manly in the semi-final. In total, Charlton played a total of 175 games for Canterbury in all grades. In 1979, Charlton signed for the struggling Newtown side which had collected the Wooden Spoon in 1978. Charlton played in Newtown's round 1 game against South Sydney which Newtown won 7-6 however he never played for the club again in first grade. In 1980, Charlton played for the Campbelltown City Kangaroos. Charlton was the nephew of former Western Suburbs, Eastern Suburbs and Canterbury player Neville Charlton. His father Ken Charlton played for Canterbury in the 1940s and 1950s. Charlton's brother Tony played 42 first grade games for Parramatta between 1973 and 1976.

== Post-playing career ==
Between 1993 and 1995, Charlton coached Canterbury's reserve grade team. Charlton was awarded life membership at Canterbury in 2007. In 2008, he sat on the football club's board until departing the role in 2013.
