= Phil Young (rugby league) =

Australian rugby league footballer

Personal information
- Full name: Phillip Edwin George Young
- Born: 26 October 1951 (age 74) Canterbury, New South Wales, Australia

Playing information
Club
Years	Team	Pld	T	G	FG	P
1972–76	Canterbury-Bankstown	61	10	0	0	30
1977	Newtown Jets	15	1	0	0	3
	Total	76	11	0	0	33

Phil Young is an Australian former rugby league footballer who played for Canterbury-Bankstown and the Newtown Jets in the New South Wales Rugby League premiership competition.

== Background ==
Young was born in Canterbury, New South Wales, Australia.

== Playing career ==
Young played a total of 61 first grade games for Canterbury. He missed out on playing in the 1974 NSWRL grand final against Eastern Suburbs. In 1977, Young switched to the struggling Newtown side and made 16 appearances as they finished with the Wooden Spoon.
