= Adam Peek =

Australian rugby league footballer

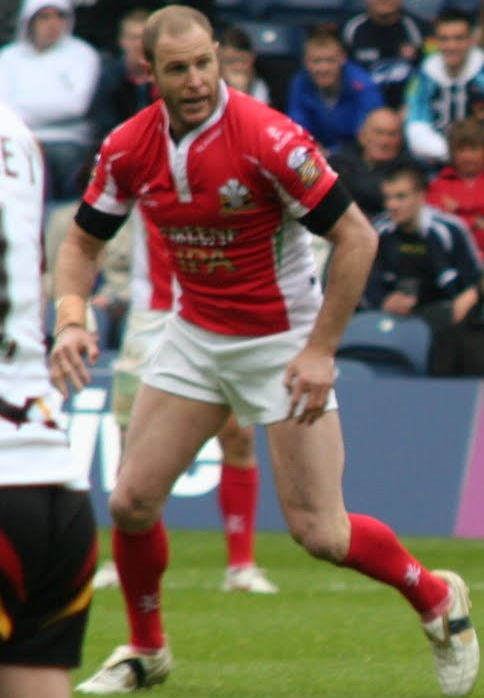

Personal information
- Full name: Adam Peek
- Born: 5 October 1977 (age 49) Sydney, New South Wales, Australia

Playing information
- Height: 190 cm (6 ft 3 in)
- Weight: 104 kg (16 st 5 lb)
- Position: Prop, Second-row
Club
Years	Team	Pld	T	G	FG	P
1997–98	Adelaide Rams	13	1	0	0	4
1999–01	Canterbury Bulldogs	23	1	0	0	4
2002	South Sydney	10	0	0	0	0
2003–06	Parramatta Eels	48	4	0	0	16
2007	St. George Illawarra	19	1	0	0	4
2008	Cronulla Sharks	21	0	0	0	0
2009–11	Crusaders RL	45	3	0	0	12
	Total	179	10	0	0	40
- Father: John Peek

Adam Peek (born 5 October 1977) is an Australian former professional rugby league footballer. Somewhat of a journeyman, Peek played first grade for the Adelaide Rams, Canterbury Bulldogs, South Sydney Rabbitohs, Parramatta Eels, St George Illawarra, Cronulla-Sutherland Sharks, and the Celtic Crusaders. His position of choice is prop.

== Background ==
Son of Canterbury and South Sydney forward John Peek, Adam began his career in the St George junior system, playing for Hurstville United, the same club as former City Origin representative Lance Thompson.

== Playing career ==
=== St George ===
Peek progressed through the local St George junior system, playing Jersey Flegg for the Dragons and captaining them to their 1996 Grand Final victory. Throughout the season Peek featured as a reserve for the first grade side, seeing no game time.

=== Adelaide ===
In 1997 Peek played for the newly formed Adelaide Rams side in the Australian Super League, wearing the unusual number of 53, as was customary in the newly formed competition. Peek continued to play for the Rams as they made the transition to the National Rugby League in 1998. Peek scored a try for the Rams in their final game against the Knights, capping off his time in Adelaide as the club was dissolved ahead of the 1999 NRL season.

=== Canterbury-Bankstown ===
In 1999, Peek joined Canterbury (first grade player number #634) and was a regular member of the reserve grade team before receiving the opportunity to play first grade against Manly when Steve Reardon was relegated. He played in the Semi-Final against Melbourne from the bench. Adam also played in the reserve grade Qualifying Semi-Final against Balmain.

In 2000, Peek was a regular member of the 1st Division team, captaining them to their victory against the Penrith Panthers.

In 2001, Peek was again captain of the Bulldog's 1st Division team, but saw an increased number of first grade games compared to his previous seasons at the club.

=== South Sydney ===
In 2002 Peek joined the re-admitted South Sydney side (first grade player number #959), playing in their return match against the Sydney Roosters. Peek would feature in a total of 10 games for the South Sydney club, all from the bench.

=== Parramatta ===
2003 saw Peek join the Parramatta Eels (first grade player number #649), the club where he would spend the bulk of his career. During his time at Parramatta, Peek proved capable of handling top flight rugby league on a week to week basis, making an increased number of first grade appearances during the club's 2005 charge towards the Minor Premiership which they won just ahead of second placed St. George Illawarra. Along with St. George, Parramatta were favorites to take out the 2005 premiership but suffered a shock 29-0 preliminary final loss against North Queensland at Telstra Stadium, a game which Peek played in from the bench.

2006 however saw Peek begin the season in Premier League before receiving a call up in round 8 against Manly-Warringah, a game in which he received a grade one dangerous throw charge, rendering him unavailable for selection for one round. Peek was next seen in first grade against the Canberra Raiders in round 17.

=== St George Illawarra ===
In 2007 Peek returned to where it all began, signing with the St George Illawarra Dragons. Peek played 19 games for the club, scoring a try in the Dragons round 10 win over the Gold Coast Titans.

=== Cronulla-Sutherland ===
In 2008, Peek played for the Cronulla-Sutherland Sharks, playing in 21 games including 2 finals matches, the qualifying final victory over the Canberra Raiders and the 28-0 preliminary final loss against Melbourne at the Sydney Football Stadium.

=== Crusaders ===
Peek joined the Crusaders in the 2009 season, playing 45 games over 3 seasons for the Welsh-based club.

== Post-retirement ==
Post professional retirement, Peek joined the Kurri Kurri Bulldogs in the local Newcastle competition for the 2012 season, citing the laid-back, authentic, rugby league experience as an attraction

Peek is employed by the NRL in a part-time mentoring role, working with players on career development and transition planning following their playing careers.

In 2015, Peek and many other current and former Bulldogs players travelled to Papua New Guinea to assist in the construction of a school. In addition to the construction of the school, Peek and the other players provided coaching clinics promoting the importance of education, healthy lifestyles and respect for women and children.
