= Geoff Connell =

Australian rugby league footballer

Personal information
- Full name: Geoffrey Connell
- Born: 2 October 1945; Gundagai, New South Wales, Australia
- Died: 16 March 2013 (aged 67); Sydney, New South Wales, Australia

Playing information
- Position: Second-row, Prop
Club
Years	Team	Pld	T	G	FG	P
1965–71	Balmain	28	1	0	0	3
1972–75	Canterbury-Bankstown	62	1	2	0	7
	Total	90	2	2	0	10
Representative
Years	Team	Pld	T	G	FG	P
1967	Australia	1	1	0	0	0
1967–69	Queensland	8	0	0	0	0
- Source: As of 17 April 2019

Geoff Connell (1945-2013) was an Australian professional rugby league footballer who played in the 1970s. He played for Canterbury-Bankstown and Balmain in the New South Wales Rugby League (NSWRL) competition.

== Background ==
Connell was born in Gundagai, New South Wales but moved to Queensland at a young age. He represented the junior Queensland side before moving back to Sydney and was graded by Balmain.

== Playing career ==
Connell made his first grade debut for Balmain in 1965. He briefly left Balmain in 1967 to complete his national service in Queensland and played for Easts in the Brisbane rugby league competition. Due to being away in Queensland, Connell missed out on playing in Balmain's 1969 premiership winning team. Between 1967 and 1969, he represented Queensland on 8 occasions and also represented Australia in 1967 against New Zealand.

Connell returned to Balmain in 1970 but was released at the end of the 1971 season due to recurring injuries. In 1972, he joined Canterbury and became a regular starter in the team and by 1973 was made captain. Connell captained the side in their 1973 semi final defeat against Newtown.

In 1974, Canterbury reached their first grade final since the 1967 grand final defeat against South Sydney. Connell played at second-row as Eastern Suburbs defeated Canterbury 19–4 at the Sydney Cricket Ground to win their first premiership since 1945. In 1975, Connell mainly played for the reserve grade side and his final game before retirement was in the reserve grade semi final against Cronulla-Sutherland. In total, he made 83 appearances for Canterbury across all grades including being captain of 20 matches in that time.

== Post playing ==
In 1976, Connell became Canterbury's Under 23 team coach. He then went on to coach the reserve grade team from 1977 to 1980 winning the reserve grade premiership in his final year. In 2004, Connell was nominated for the Berries to Bulldogs 70 Year Team of Champions. He died on 16 March 2013.
