= Ken Charlton (rugby league) =

Australian rugby league footballer

Personal information
- Full name: Kenneth James Charlton
- Born: 15 July 1923 Auburn, New South Wales
- Died: 19 November 2012 (aged 89)

Playing information
Club
Years	Team	Pld	T	G	FG	P
1946–54	Canterbury-Bankstown	147	7	0	0	21
- Relatives: Phil Charlton (son); Neville Charlton (brother)

Kenneth James Charlton (15 July 1923 – 19 November 2012) was an Australian rugby league footballer who played in the 1940s and 1950s. Charlton joined the Royal Australian Air Force and served with mixed British, Canadian and Australian crews in the RAF 58 Squadron, primarily at Stornoway in Scotland where the squadron formed part of Coastal Command.

Charlton played for Canterbury-Bankstown between 1946 and 1954 and was captain between 1951 and 1954. He was awarded the Australian Sports Medal in 2000. His son, Phil Charlton, also played for Canterbury and Newtown throughout the 1970s. His brother Neville Charlton played for Canterbury, Eastern Suburbs and Western Suburbs. His other son Tony Charlton played for Parramatta in the 1970s.
