= Neville Charlton =

Australian rugby league footballer (1928-2014)

Personal information
- Full name: Neville Charlton
- Born: 15 September 1928
- Died: 13 June 2014 (aged 85) Gosford, New South Wales, Australia

Playing information
- Position: Prop
Club
Years	Team	Pld	T	G	FG	P
1948–53	Canterbury-Bankstown	61	22	2	0	70
1954–61	Western Suburbs	143	27	2	0	85
1962–63	Eastern Suburbs	24	1	0	0	3
	Total	228	50	4	0	158
Representative
Years	Team	Pld	T	G	FG	P
1959–61	New South Wales	3	0	0	0	0
- Relatives: Phil Charlton (nephew); Ken Charlton (brother)

Neville Charlton, nicknamed "Boxhead" (1928–2014), was an Australian professional rugby league footballer who played in the 1940s, 1950s and 1960s. He played for Canterbury-Bankstown, Western Suburbs and Eastern Suburbs as a prop.

== Playing career ==
Charlton began his career with Canterbury in 1948 and spent six seasons with the club playing a total of 61 games. In 1954, Charlton moved to Western Suburbs and played 143 games for the club. Charlton was a member of the 1958 and 1961 sides which made the grand final but were on the losing side against St. George on both occasions the latter playing as captain. In 1962, Charlton joined Eastern Suburbs and spent two seasons there before retiring. Charlton also played for New Souths Wales on three occasions between 1959 and 1961.

== Post playing ==
In retirement, Charlton was a committee member of the league of men foundation. He was later voted in the Western Suburbs team of the century and was inducted into the clubs hall of fame. He died on 13 June 2014.
