= Camden Rams =

Australian rugby league club, based in Camden, NSW

Club information
- Full name: Camden Rugby League Football Club
- Nickname: Camden Rams
- Colours: Red; Navy; White
- Founded: 1910; 116 years ago

Current details
- Ground: Kirkham Park, Camden
- Coach: Bradley Speechley
- Captain: Bradley Speechley
- Competition: Group 6 Rugby League then to Wests Group Macarthur since 2022 due to change with CRL and NSWRL
- 2026: 1st
- Current season

The Camden Rugby League Football Club is an Australian rugby league football club based in Camden, New South Wales, formed in 1910. They currently play in the merged Macarthur/ Group 6 Rugby League competition.

In the 1920s the club competed in the Southern Districts Rugby League. They won premierships in that competition in 1922 and 1923. During the 1930s Camden mostly played for challenge cups, although they did participate in a Group 6 league competition in 1935. Camden returned to the re-formed Group 6 competition in 1946. Semi-finalists in 1947, Camden were minor premiers in 1948. Losing their semi-final to Picton, Camden exercised their right to challenge Bowral in a Grand Final. This match was drawn. In a replay, Camden triumphed by 14 points to five. Further premierships were won in 1951, 1978, 1994, 1997, 1998, 2000, 2002, 2016, 2022, 2024, 2025, 2026.

In 2015 Camden RLFC made the grand final in U18's (Div 1), Reserve Grade and First Grade but was unable to bring home a Premiership in any Grade. In First Grade the Rams came up against the Picton Magpies who had dominated the competition over the past few years. They were again too strong and the Rams finished Runners up to end a day with no wins and to chants of 'Ram Soup'

2016 became a record breaking year for the Rams with Camden entering a team in the inaugural Ladies Leaguetag (LLT) Group 6 competition and taking out the minor Premiership. 2016 also became the #4from4 year with Premierships in all four of the premier competitions, making Group 6 history.

The U18s, LLT and First Grade all won minor Premierships whilst Reserve Grade scrapped into 5th position. However, it was a reverse of 2015, the Rams had a record making Grand Final day winning the premiership in U18, LLT, Reserve Grade and finishing with First Grade against the odds ending the Picton Magpies premiership run. Due to a run of injuries the First Grade premiership team included three players eligible for U18's that season including Andrew Horne (18), Jake Scott (18) and Jackson Willis (17 and 9 months), all playing pivotable roles in the season and Grand Final.

In 2019 the Camden Reserve Grade team, coached by Andrew Willis went through the competition to complete the season as undefeated premiers. In the same year U18s won the Premiership and the Rams also won the inaugural Women’s Rugby League competition as undefeated Premiers. The club were named 2019 Club Champions.

With 2020 interrupted with COVID-19 the Rams didn’t field any teams except 3rd grade for the season.

In 2021 the season was cut short with finals not proceeding, again impacted by COVID-19, however Premierships were awarded to all first placed teams when the announcement was made. As a result the Rams Women’s Rugby League team won the premiership.

2022 saw the return of a full season with interruptions through the season but this time as a result of poor weather and flooding rendering grounds unplayable. It was also the first year of the merged competition under NSWRL known as the Wests Group Macarthur Competition, seeing the return of Campbelltown sides from Easts Campbelltown and collegians in First Grade and other clubs in lower grade competitions.

The Rams finished the season proper as equal 1st in First grade but 2nd due to fore and against, Undefeated Premiers in Reserve Grade, 3rd in Women’s Rugby League, 5th in U18s, 4th in Conference Gold and out of the finals in Ladies Leaguetag. The WRL were defeated in the grand final whilst Reserve Grade won as Undefeated Premiers under coach Harrison Fox. However, the biggest upset of the day was when Camden defeated the much favoured East Campbelltown side with a convincing 30 - 4 win. It was the first time in the season the Rams had every 1st Grade player available to play, albeit Jackson Willis who played from the bench after badly dislocating a shoulder only weeks prior. Willis and Josh Goulton were the only returning 1st Grade Premiership winners from the 2016 team. The Club was named Club Champions.

In 2022 The Rams player Danny Fualalo was named the Wests Group Macarthur First Grade Player of the Year.

In 2023 the Rams fielded 7 teams and made the finals series for 6 of them. LLT Silver, Women's Rugby League (WRL) and Reserve were defeated in the Preliminary Final. The Rams Inaugural U18 Girls Rugby League team put in a great effort against a more experience opposition and were defeated. The First grade who finished the season as minor Premiers were leading in the second half, only to allow Thirlmere in for two late tries which narrowly defeated the Rams by 2 points. The U18 boys however put on an outstanding performance to defeat Narellan and finish as deserving Undefeated Premiers.

In 2024 the Rams fielded 8 teams into the competition with WRL (in both season 1 and 2), two LLT teams, two U18 Boys teams, U18 Girls Rugby League, Reserve Grade and First Grade. The WRL finished season 2.0 as Minor premiers but missed making it through to the GF. LLT Silver made it through to the finals, but missed making the GF. U18 Gold went on to be Undefeated Premiers beating East Campbelltown 26 -16 in the GF. Reserve grade went on from Minor Premiers to win the Premiership 22-20 over Oakdale. First grade seeking redemption for 2023, went through as Undefeated Premiers beating The Oaks in extra time in the Grand Final 38-26. Josh Goulton and Jackson Willis made it their 3rd First Grade Premiership with the Rams, whilst Brad Speechley, Bailey Dickinson, Ben Powers, Brad Hopkins, Danny Fualalo, Kisi Taulani, Logan Matapuku and Steele Brown got their second Rams First Grade Premiership.

First Grader Jack Miller finished the year as competition top point scorer and joint top try scorer. Club stalwart Chris Browne finished the year as Reserve grade competition top point scorer, whilst Lindsay Munro finished as top Try Scorer. Aiden Richards from 18 Gold took out the competition top point scorer and Joel Collins top try scorer. The Camden Rams were also awarded the Semi Professional Club Championship.

In 2024 the Camden Rams were awarded the prestigious Claytons Cup, recognised as the best performing team in Country rugby league.

In 2025 the Rams entered 8 teams across the Southern and Macarthur Competitions. All teams earnt spots in the finals series. LLT Gold, Reserve Grade and First Grade all finished on top of the ladder at the end of the regular rounds. U18 Silver and U18 Gold both moved through to Grand Finals but didn't walk away with the win. LLT Gold went on to earn the title of Undefeated Premiers. The WRL played in the Southern Corridor competition and despite finishing 2nd they finished as Premiers. Reserve Grade also moved through to the Grand Final after a tight semi, and earnt the Premiership title in a strong game against The Oaks. First Grade also moved straight through to the Grand Final after a few injuries in the Semi. The day prior to the Grand Final Captain Coach was cleared to play after suffering a nasty concussion in the Semi. The Rams came up against 2nd placed Campbelltown Collegians who were a much bigger pack and tough throughout the year. The Camden boys went out and had a strong 1st half but let the determined Collies pack back into the game. The Rams however were too strong and on to win the title as back to back Premiers, only dropping one game through the season.

The Rams were named Premiership Club Champions for the 4th straight year, with Jackson Willis and John Ryan awarded the competition top point and try scorer along with Joss Haddad in LLT (point scorer), Shylah Noonan in LLT (try scorer), Sam Lynch (try scorer) in Reserve Grade and Jemma Crane in WRL. Hunter Redman was named 18 Gold Player of the Year, and Brad Speechley First Grade Coach of the Year.

In 2026 the Macarthur competition changed the female rugby league competitions to U13, U15, U17 and WRL. Only WRL falls with the Camden Senior club with the other remaining with the Junior club. This also saw the first year that Camden entered a team in the over 35 Mens Leaguetag competition under captain/ coach Sam Campbell.

2026 saw the Rams take out minor premiership in First grade, Reserve Grade, U18 Gold and LLT-1. Our 18 Silver, WRL, 35MLT and LLT-2 teams didn't secure spots in the final series. Following a run of injuries and players withdrawing the Reserve grade team were beaten in the Preliminary final so missed their chance at the Grand Final. The Rams however were named Premiership Club Champions for the 5th year, reflecting the quality of all squads.

The Rams finished the season as Undefeated Premiers in LLT-1 beating Oran Park 26-0 in the grand final, also becoming back to back Undefeated premiers under coach Jimmy Merheb.

The 18 Gold competition was marred with a number of stand downs leaving the Rams missing a number of games with forfeits to. Despite being the underdogs in a grand final re-match from 2025, the Rams under coaches Jackson Willis and Bailey Dickinson came out firing in the first game of the season that all players were fit at the same time to be on the field. The team full of talent showed there skills, controlled the ball, had strong defense and took the premiership from The Oaks 22-8.

In First Grade the 2025 grand final rematch was predicted to be down the wire, and it didn't disappoint. The Campbelltown Collegians got off to a great start with two tries to start the game, leaving the Rams with a big effort to claw the margin back, against a much bigger pack. With a vocal crowd cheering on both teams the Rams finally crossed through Trent People to reduce the margin. Aiden Menzies crossed not long after and the see-saw game continued. Jackson Willis, John Tuivaiti and Mitch Gray scored for the Rams, but a penalty after the bell saw the Collies get a penalty kick resulting in a draw after regular play.

With extra time to decide the Grand Final, Jackson Willis kicked a penalty before the break to put the Rams 2 points up. With the Rams defending their line in the final minutes of the second period of extra time, Steele Brown took an intercept, went the length of the field and crushed the hopes of the Collies supporters. Jackson sealed the game with a conversion leaving the Rams Undefeated Premiers 38-30.

The Rams completed the First Grade 3-peat and 4 First Grade Premierships in the past 5 years. Jackson Willis also broke the individual record now holding 5 First Grade Premierships with the Rams and Brad Speechley continues to hold the record Captain/ Coaching his 4th Rams Premiership.

First Grade Premiership Winning Coaches:-

- 2026: Bradley Speechley - Captain/ Coach (Undefeated)
- 2025: Bradley Speechley - Captain/ Coach
- 2024: Bradley Speechley (Undefeated and Claytons Cup) - Captain/ Coach
- 2022: Mason Cerruto and Bradley Speechley - Co-Captain Coach
- 2016: Scott Borg - Captain/ Coach
- 2002: Mitch Newton - Captain/ Coach
- 2000: Andrew Willis - Captain/Coach
- 1998: Peter Gentle - Captain/ Coach
- 1997: Peter Gentle - Captain/ Coach
- 1994: David Greene - Captain/ Coach
- 1978: Rod Jackson - Captain/ Coach
- 1951: Keith Clarke
- 1948: Herb Narvo -
- 1923: Camden Rams
- 1922: Camden Rams

== Notable players ==
- David Greene (Penrith Panthers)
- Peter Gentle (St George Dragons)
- Andrew Willis (Western Suburbs Magpies)
- Jason Eade (Western Suburbs Magpies & Western Reds)
- Mitch Newton (Canterbury Bulldogs, Australian Kangaroos)
- Scott Davey (Canterbury Bulldogs)
- Kevin Thomson Jnr (Balmain)
- Mark Thomson (Western Suburbs Magpies)
- Ray Cashmere (1999–2012 Western Suburbs Magpies, West Tigers, Salford City Reds & North Queensland Cowboys)
- Dean Collis (Wests Tigers, Cronulla Sharks)
- Shannon McDonnell (Wests Tigers, Newcastle Knights)
- Mason Cerruto (Wests Tigers, Penrith Panthers, Canterbury-Bankstown Bulldogs, Italy)
- Danny Fualalo (Canterbury Bankstown Bulldogs)
- Trent Peoples (South Sydney Rabbitohs)

Local Juniors played NRL or NRLW:

- James Tedesco (2012– current Wests Tigers/ Sydney Roosters), NSW and Australian Captain
- Dean Britt (2017– Melbourne Storm, Canterbury Bulldogs)
- Abbi Church (2022- current Parramatta Eels, 2023, 2024 & 2025 Prime Minister's XIII, 2025 and 2026 NSW, 2025 and 2026 Australian Jillaroo's)
- Macie Carlile (2023 - St George Dragons, 2024 Cronulla, 2025 Roosters - Grand Finalist)
- Madison Mulhall (2023 - current St George Dragons)

Local Juniors played NYC (U20)/ Jersey Flegg (U21):

- Mark McCormack (Wests Tigers)
- Jesse Jackson (Wests Tigers)
- Mason Cerruto (Wests Tigers, Canterbury Bulldogs)
- Zac Greene (Canterbury Bulldogs)
- Will Kerr (Canterbury Bulldogs)
- Jackson Willis (St George Illawarra Dragons)
- Ben Powers (Wests Tigers)
- Kereti Tautaiolefua (Sydney Roosters)
- Bailey Dickinson (St George Illawarra Dragons)
- Jay Kirk (Wests Tigers)
- Cameron Lawrence (Canterbury Bulldogs)
- Harry Delaney (Wests Tigers)
- Thomas Goodfield (Penrith Panthers)
- Riley Oitmann U15-U18 (Wests Tigers)

Male Player of the Year: introduced 2018

- 2018 Luke Pollard
- 2019 Will Kerr
- 2022 Danny Fualalo
- 2023 Bradley Speechley
- 2024 Danny Fualalo
- 2025 Jackson Willis
- 2026

Female Player of the Year: introduced 2018

- 2018 Abbi Church
- 2019 Abbi Church
- 2022 Paige Knapp/ Karina Copeland
- 2023 Katie Stevens
- 2024 Ella Fielding
- 2025 Jemma Crane
- 2026

Leaguetag Player of the Year: Introduced 2025

- 2025 Joss Haddad
- 2026

Rookie Award (Male):

- 2016 Jackson Willis
- 2017 Steele Brown
- 2018 Luke Peoples
- 2019 Ben Quinlan
- 2022 Tom Chanter
- 2023 Harry Delaney
- 2024 Lindsay Munro
- 2025 Riley Oitmann
- 2026

Rookie Award (Female) introduced 2023

- 2023 Katie Stevens
- 2024 Krista Grima
- 2025 Scarlett Newton
- 2026

Rising Star Award (Male):

- 2016 Andrew Horne
- 2017 Greg Bentham
- 2018 Cameron Oitmann
- 2019 Raymond Redman
- 2022 Lindsay Munro
- 2023 Lachlan Dooner
- 2024 Kurtis Dupond
- 2025 Jake Gaffney
- 2026

Rising Star Award (Female) introduced 2023

- 2023 Breanna Cunningham
- 2024 Scarlett Newton
- 2025 Izabel Williams
- 2026

Shaun Durrington Socialiser of the Year:

- 1986 Brendon Reilly
- 1987 Colin Mulley
- 1988 Steve Ricketts
- 1989 Craig Chapman
- 1990 Duncan Skinner
- 1991 Shaun Durrington
- 1992 Paul Dooner
- 1993 Glenn Redman
- 1994 Kevin Thompson
- 1995 Mathew McHutchinson
- 1996 Gavin Bell
- 1997
- 1998 Duncan Macauley
- 1999 Adam Buckley
- 2000 Andrew Willis
- 2001 Matt Fenn
- 2002 Mick Kearney
- 2003 Matt Urban
- 2004 Matt Dickinson
- 2005 Daniel Finch
- 2006 Lee Baxter
- 2007 Robbie Weir
- 2008 George Gordon
- 2009 Pat Purcell
- 2010 Elliot Kidd
- 2011 Mark De Ubago
- 2013 Chris Corby
- 2014 Jason Stevens
- 2015
- 2016 Harry Lording
- 2017 Riley Thomson
- 2018 Jeremy Hill
- 2019 Ramigo's (Steele Brown, Cameron Sgouros, Layne Storrier)
- 2022 Jackson Willis
- 2023 Patty Dumont
- 2024 Jackson Willis
- 2025 Ewan Xuereb
- 2026

Andrew Willis is the only person to have coached and won Premierships in each premier competition with the Rams. 2000 - First Grade, 2016 - U18s, 2019 - Reserve Grade, 2021 - Women’s Rugby League 2025 - WRL Silver

Jackson Willis has won 5 First Grade Premierships with the Rams (2016, 2022, 2024, 2025, 2026). Holding four is Kevin Thomson Jnr (1997, 1998, 2000, 2002) Josh Goulton, Brad Speechley, Bailey Dickinson, Ben Powers, Danny Fualalo and Steele Brown all now holding 4 First Grade Premiership titles.
