= Bill Joass =

Australian Rugby league footballer

Personal information
- Full name: William Alfred Joass
- Born: 5 July 1909; Lakemba, New South Wales, Australia
- Died: 22 December 1983 (aged 74)

Playing information
- Position: Wing
Club
Years	Team	Pld	T	G	FG	P
1935	Canterbury-Bankstown	4	0	0	0	0
- Father: Rangi Joass

Bill Joass was an Australian professional rugby league footballer who played in the 1930s. He played one season for Canterbury-Bankstown of the New South Wales Rugby League Premiership.

== Playing career ==
Joass had a brief career in the NSWRL with little team success. He made his debut for Canterbury in Round 2 of 1935 - only the club's second game in history. He started at wing, with his side losing badly to the South Sydney Rabbitohs 37-9. He played 3 more consecutive games, before finishing his career 5 rounds into the season's start. In Round 5, Joass played the final game of his career in a record-breaking 6-91 loss to the St. George Dragons. This still stands as the largest winning margin (85) in a game in the history of the NSWRL/NRL.

Joass concluded his career with four appearances and no points. All four games he played were losses.
