= Frank Flynn (rugby league) =

Australian rugby league footballer

Personal information
- Full name: Frank Flynn

Playing information
- Position: Wing, Centre
Club
| Years | Team | Pld | T | G | FG | P |
|---|---|---|---|---|---|---|
| 1948–52 | Canterbury-Bankstown | 70 | 35 | 0 | 0 | 105 |
- Source: As of 9 July 2019

Frank Flynn was an Australian professional rugby league footballer who played in the 1940s and 1950s. He played for Canterbury-Bankstown in the New South Wales Rugby League (NSWRL) competition.

== Playing career ==
Flynn made his first grade debut for Canterbury against South Sydney in Round 17 1948 at Redfern Oval. Canterbury would go on to finish the season in fifth place just outside the playoff places.

Although Canterbury-Bankstown would miss the finals each year Flynn was at the club, he finished as the club's top try scorer in 1949, 1951 and 1952. At the time of his retirement, Flynn was the fourth highest try scorer in the club's history. Flynn played a total of 81 games for the club across all grades. In 2004, Flynn was nominated for the Berries to Bulldogs 70 Year Team of Champions.
