= Keith Gersbach =

Australian rugby league footballer

Personal information
- Full name: Keith Gersbach
- Born: 1 March 1924 Penrith, New South Wales, Australia
- Died: 26 June 2015 (aged 91) St Marys, New South Wales, Australia

Playing information
- Position: Wing
Club
Years	Team	Pld	T	G	FG	P
1945–46	Canterbury-Bankstown	16	7	0	0	21
1947–48	Parramatta	24	12	0	0	36
	Total	40	19	0	0	57

Keith Gersbach (1924-2015) nicknamed "The Colonel" was an Australian rugby league footballer who played in the 1940s. He played for Canterbury-Bankstown and Parramatta as a winger.

== Playing career ==
Gersbach grew up in the Penrith district and played his junior rugby league with St Mary's. Gersbach then served in World War 2 at New Guinea and returned home after suffering from malaria. He later joined Canterbury-Bankstown in 1945 making his debut against Balmain. Gersbach spent two seasons at Canterbury and mainly played in reserve grade before joining newly admitted side Parramatta in 1947. Gersbach was signed as the highest paid player in the new team earning 108 pounds a season. Gersbach played in Parramatta's first ever game on 12 April 1947 against Newtown at Cumberland Oval with the match finishing in a 34-12 defeat. Parramatta went on to finish last in their inaugural year but Gersbach did finish as top try scorer. Gersbach played on for another season in 1948 but left the club at the end of the year and retired.
