= Michael Reid (rugby league) =

Australian rugby league footballer

Personal information
- Full name: Michael Reid

Playing information
- Position: Hooker
Club
Years	Team	Pld	T	G	FG	P
1987	Canterbury-Bankstown	3	0	0	0	0
1988–89	Newcastle Knights	3	0	0	0	0
	Total	6	0	0	0	0
- Source: As of 6 February 2019

Michael Reid is a former professional rugby league footballer who played in the 1980s. He played for the Canterbury Bulldogs in 1987 and the Newcastle Knights from 1988 to 1989.

== Playing career ==
Reid made his first grade debut for Canterbury against North Sydney in Round 1 1987 at Belmore Oval.

In 1988, Reid joined Newcastle and played in the club's inaugural season. Reid's final game in first grade was a 20–2 loss against Western Suburbs at Campbelltown Stadium in Round 16 1989.

== Post playing ==
Reid became part of the training staff at Newcastle after retiring as a player.
