= John McDonell (rugby league) =

Australian rugby league footballer

Personal information
- Full name: John McDonell
- Born: 13 May 1943 (age 83) Berry, New South Wales, Australia

Playing information
- Position: Second-row, Lock, Centre
Club
Years	Team	Pld	T	G	FG	P
1965–67	Manly Warringah	27	2	0	0	6
1968–72	North Sydney	100	15	0	2	49
1973–74	Canterbury Baulldogs	37	7	0	0	21
	Total	164	24	0	2	76

John McDonell (born 13 May 1943) is an Australian former professional rugby league footballer who played in the 1960s and 1970s.

== Playing career ==
McDonell began his career with Northern Beaches club Manly in 1965 and spent three seasons with them before joining arch rivals North Sydney in 1968. McDonell spent five seasons with North Sydney but the club never qualified for the finals in his time there. In 1973, McDonell became the captain of Canterbury-Bankstown and in 1974 the club reached the grand final against Eastern Suburbs. The first half of the match was a tight affair with Easts leading Canterbury 7–4 at the break before storming home in the second half to win 19–4. This would be McDonell's last ever game and he retired following the grand final defeat.
