= Michael Appleby (rugby league) =

Australian rugby league footballer

Personal information
- Born: 6 July 1970 (age 54)

Playing information
- Position: Second-row, Wing
Club
Years	Team	Pld	T	G	FG	P
1990–91	Canterbury Bulldogs	1	0	0	0	0
1992–94	Eastern Suburbs	17	3	0	0	12
1995	Parramatta Eels	2	0	0	0	0
	Total	20	3	0	0	12

Michael Appleby is an Australian former professional rugby league footballer who played for the Canterbury Bulldogs, Eastern Suburbs and the Parramatta Eels.

== Rugby league career ==
Appleby started his career at Canterbury, where he played as a forward. He featured mostly in the lower grades for the Bulldogs, with only one first-grade appearance. In 1991 he was a member of Canterbury's Under-21s premiership team.

While at Eastern Suburbs he transitioned into a winger and had his breakthrough season in 1993, earning a Rising Star nomination. He scored two tries in Easts' round five win over South Sydney and featured in each of the first eight rounds, before suffering a broken cheekbone.

Following the 1994 season, Appleby moved to the Parramatta Eels and played first-grade at his new club as a lock.
