= Max Cole (rugby league) =

Australian rugby league footballer

Personal information
- Full name: Maxwell John Cole
- Born: 17 September 1951 kogarah
- Died: 15 November 2018 (aged 67)

Playing information
- Position: Wing
Club
Years	Team	Pld	T	G	FG	P
1972	St. George	9	5	0	0	15
1973–75	Canterbury-Bankstown	44	19	0	0	57
1976	St. George	2	0	0	0	0
	Total	55	24	0	0	72
- Source: As of 7 February 2024

Max Cole (1951-2018) was an Australian former professional rugby league footballer who played in the 1970s. He played for St. George and Canterbury-Bankstown in the NSWRL competition.

== Playing career ==
Cole played his junior rugby league at Renown United before signing with St. George. Cole made his first grade debut in round 16 of the 1972 NSWRFL season against Penrith scoring a try in a 17–12 victory at Penrith Park. Cole played a total of nine games for St. George in his debut season as the club reached the preliminary final against Eastern Suburbs but lost the match 8–6. In 1973, Cole switched to Canterbury-Bankstown. Cole played a total of 44 matches for the club and was unlucky not to earn a spot in their 1974 NSWRL grand final loss against Eastern Suburbs. In 1976, he returned to St. George but only made two appearances.
