= Eddie Bowen =

Australian rugby league footballer (1916–1966)

Personal information
- Full name: Elvin James Bowen
- Born: 13 May 1916 Canterbury, New South Wales, Australia
- Died: 10 December 1966 (aged 50) Strathfield, New South Wales, Australia

Playing information
- Position: Hooker
Club
Years	Team	Pld	T	G	FG	P
1935	Canterbury-Bankstown	2	0	0	0	0
1936	St. George Dragons	3	0	0	0	0
	Total	5	0	0	0	0

Elvin James 'Eddie' Bowen (13 May 1916 – 10 December 1966) was an Australian rugby league player from the 1930s.

Eddie Bowen was a Canterbury junior league player who was graded in 1935 aged 19. He moved to St. George Dragons in 1936, before retiring.

== Death ==
Eddie Bowen died on 10 December 1966 at Strathfield, New South Wales aged 50.
