= Steve Zaccaria =

Australian rugby player

Playing information
- Position: Hooker
Club
| Years | Team | Pld | T | G | FG | P |
|---|---|---|---|---|---|---|
| 1942–43, 1945 | Canterbury-Bankstown | 6 | 1 | 0 | 0 | 3 |

Steve Zaccaria was an Australian professional rugby league footballer for Canterbury-Bankstown of the New South Wales Rugby League Premiership (NSWRL).

== Playing career ==
Zaccaria made his debut with Canterbury in the 1942 City Cup matchup against St. George. He did not play in the 1942 NSWRL season.

He played his first game in the state competition in round 3 of the 1943 season. His team lost to Newtown 6-33. Canterbury, the reigning premiers and minor premiers of the previous season struggled throughout 1943. In Round 8, Zaccaria scored the first try of his career, however Canterbury lost the game 11-36 to North Sydney, making it a seven-game losing streak for the club. Zaccaria made three more appearances with the team that year, however the team failed to find success, not winning any games in May or June.

Zaccaria did not make an appearance in 1944. He would return for the final game of his career in a win against South Sydney in round 4. Zaccaria concluded his career with 1 try from 6 appearances.
