= Alan Crumpton =

Professional rugby league footballer

Personal information
- Born: 27 January 1928 Cowra, New South Wales, Australia
- Died: 13 January 1983 (aged 54)

Playing information
- Position: Wing, Centre
Club
Years	Team	Pld	T	G	FG	P
1949–53	Canterbury-Bankstown	33	15	0	0	0

Alan Crumpton (27 January 1928 – 13 January 1983) was an Australian professional rugby league footballer of the 1940s and 1950s. He played five seasons in the New South Wales Rugby League Premiership for the Canterbury-Bankstown club.

== Playing career ==
Starting in reserve grade in 1947, before becoming a regular member of the 1948 third grade team. Crumpton was eventually promoted to the first grade side in 1949, making his debut in Round 3 against St. George. His side lost 9-39. He scored his first career try in Canterbury's 17-28 loss to Newtown in Round 8. In Round 12 (his final game for the season), he scored another try in a rematch against St. George. Crumpton finished the season with two tries from seven appearances.

In 1950, Crumpton had arguably the most successful season of his career. He scored a try the opening round of the season in a narrow lost to South Sydney, before scoring a try in 4 straight consecutive games. In Round 17 (second last round), he scored 2 tries against Parramatta, with his side winning 23-9. Crumpton finished the season with 9 tries in 16 appearances - tying with Cec Cooper as Canterbury's leading tryscorer. He was also tied as the second-highest point-scorer for his team, behind the team's primary goal-kicker, Ronald Willey.

Crumpton only made 3 appearances in 1951, not scoring any points that season.

The next season, he scored 2 tries against the Manly-Warringah in Round 13. He finished that year with 4 tries from only 6 appearances. During that time, he mostly played reserve grade, playing against South Sydney in the reserve grade Grand Final in 1952.

Crumpton played one game in 1953, which turned out to be his last game. His final game of his career was against Newtown in a 9-12 loss. Crumpton finished his career with 15 tries (45 points) in 33 appearances.
