= Mitch Newton =

Australian rugby league player (born 1968)

Personal information
- Born: 26 June 1968 (age 58)

Playing information
- Position: Prop
Club
Years	Team	Pld	T	G	FG	P
1990–98	Canterbury Bulldogs	106	3	0	0	12

Mitch Newton is an Australian rugby league player who played professionally for the Canterbury-Bankstown Bulldogs.

== Playing career ==
A Patrician Bros Fairfield junior, Newton joined the Canterbury-Bankstown Bulldogs in 1988 as a prop forward. After starting the season late, Newton became a regular member of the under-21 team. He made his first grade debut in 1990. He went on to play 106 first grade games until 1998.

Newton played for the Camden Rams in 2002 in the Group 6 Rugby League competition and was captain-coach of the side that won the premiership. He returned to coach the club in 2013, assisted by former Bulldogs team-mate Brent Sherwin.
