= Bill Petley =

Australian rugby league footballer

Personal information
- Full name: William Thomas Petley
- Born: 16 March 1935 Sydney, New South Wales, Australia
- Died: 29 December 2024 (aged 89) Brisbane

Playing information
- Position: Fullback, Wing
Club
Years	Team	Pld	T	G	FG	P
1956	Canterbury-Bankstown	6	1	4	0	11
1957	Newtown	1	0	0	0	0
1958–63	Canterbury-Bankstown	87	6	78	0	174
	Total	94	7	82	0	185
Representative
Years	Team	Pld	T	G	FG	P
1964	NSW Country	1	0	0	0	0
- Source: As of 15 March 2022

William Thomas Petley (16 March 1935 - 29 December 2024) was an Australian professional rugby league footballer who played in the 1950s and 1960s. He played for Canterbury-Bankstown and Newtown in the New South Wales Rugby League (NSWRL) competition.

== Playing career ==
Petley made his first grade debut for Canterbury against Manly-Warringah in Round 13 1956 at Brookvale Oval. At the end of the 1956 season, Petley joined Newtown but only managed to make one appearance for them before joining Canterbury-Bankstown once again in 1957. In 1958, Petley finished as Canterbury's top point scorer but the club did poorly on the field and only avoided the wooden spoon by finishing just above last placed Parramatta.

In 1960, Canterbury reached the finals for the first time in many years and Petley played in the club's semi final defeat against Eastern Suburbs. Petley played with Canterbury until the end of 1963 before departing the club. Petley's final season saw him move to the wing as his fullback position was taken by an emerging Les Johns.

In 1964, Petley represented NSW Country Firsts against NSW City Firsts; with the City side prevailing over Country that day 27–4. In the same year, Petley was selected in two NSW regional representative teams to play the touring French rugby league side. On 31 May 1964, he captained the NSW North Coast team that beat the touring French rugby league side 21–19 in a boilover. On the second occasion that year (24 June 1964) Petley played fullback for the Gold Coast Firsts team against the touring French; with the 'Les Chanticleers' this time winning the match,16-0.

Petley played a total of 101 games for the club across all grades. In 2004, Petley was nominated for the Berries to Bulldogs 70 Year Team of Champions.

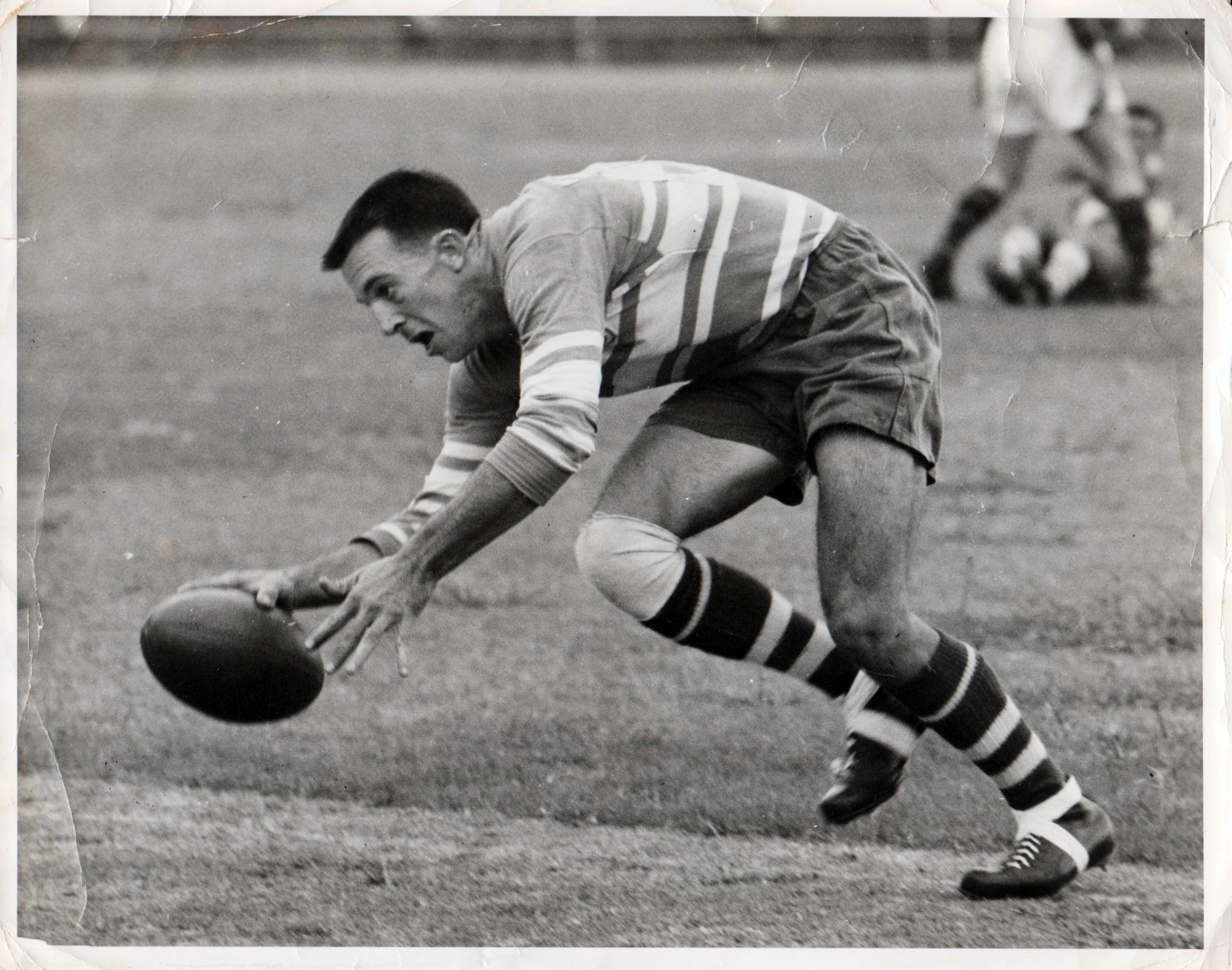
