= Scahill =

Scahill or Skehill is an Anglicized form of Irish MacSgaithghil. Notable people with the surname include:

- James Skehill (born 1988), Irish hurler
- Jeremy Scahill (born 1974) American investigative journalist
- Roland Scahill
- Stephen Scahill
- Stephen Skehill, Australian lawyer and public servant
