= Alan Mason =

Australian rugby league footballer and coach

Personal information
- Full name: Alan Mason
- Born: 3 July 1934 Balmain, New South Wales, Australia
- Died: 29 December 2014 (aged 80) Nowra, New South Wales, Australia

Playing information
- Position: Five-eighth
Club
Years	Team	Pld	T	G	FG	P
1954–55	Canterbury-Bankstown	13	1	0	0	3
1956–62	Balmain	73	5	0	0	15
	Total	86	6	0	0	18

Coaching information
Club
Years	Team	Gms	W	D	L	W%
1974	Balmain	22	4	2	16	18
- Source: As of 16 May 2019

Alan Mason (1934-2014) was an Australian professional rugby league footballer who played in the 1950s and 1960s. He played for Balmain and Canterbury-Bankstown in the New South Wales Rugby League (NSWRL) competition. Mason later coached the club in the 1970s.

== Playing career ==
Mason made his first grade debut for Canterbury against Manly-Warringah in 1954. Mason left Canterbury at the end of the 1955 season. In total, he played 29 games for the club across all grades. In 1956, Mason joined Balmain and in his first season at the club was unlucky not gain selection in the team which made the 1956 NSWRL grand final which Balmain lost against St George.

Mason played with Balmain up until the end of 1962 before signing with Monaro in the Canberra competition. He captain-coached a Monaro representative team against a touring South African side in 1963.

== Coaching career ==
In 1968, Mason became coach of the Balmain third grade side which won the premiership that year. After coaching the third grade side for a number of years, he became coach of the Balmain Under 23 side which won the premiership against Newtown in 1973.

In 1974, Leo Nosworthy stepped down as head coach of Balmain and Mason was named as the replacement. Mason's one season in charge was not successful as Balmain finished last on the table claiming the wooden spoon. Mason then suffered an acquired brain injury after a workplace accident which made him unable to continue coaching.

Sporting positions
Preceded by Leo Nosworthy; 1969–1973	Coach Balmain Tigers; 1974	Succeeded by Paul Broughton; 1975–1976
