= Dennis Bendall =

Australian rugby league player

Personal information
- Full name: Dennis Frederick Bendall
- Born: 1 October 1956 (age 68)

Playing information
- Position: Centre
Club
Years	Team	Pld	T	G	FG	P
1976–79	Balmain Tigers	68	24	0	0	72

Dennis Frederick Bendall (born 1 October 1956) is an Australian former rugby league player for the Balmain Tigers.

Born to a Japanese mother, Bendall went to school with Balmain halfback Greg Cox and was a Holy Cross junior. He made his first-grade debut for Balmain aged 19 in 1976 and during the season was a member of their Amco Cup-winning side. Mainly a centre, Bendall scored a career high 10 tries in 1977 and featured in two finals that year.

Bendall's career was ended by a spinal injury suffered in the 1979 off-season. He had been looking after pupils from De La Salle Kingsgrove on an end-of-year camp to the Blue Mountains and was swinging off a rope into a pool when he slipped and hit his head on a submerged object, fracturing a vertebra. Paralysed from the neck down, Bendall gradually regained movement and in 1988 was awarded $750,000 damages after suing the NSW government for danger warnings not being in place.
