= Mal Creevey =

Australian rugby league footballer

Personal information
- Full name: Malcolm Creevey
- Born: 27 December 1956 Sydney, New South Wales
- Died: 10 August 1993 (aged 36) Perth, Western Australia

Playing information
- Position: Halfback
Club
Years	Team	Pld	T	G	FG	P
1976–80	Canterbury-Bankstown	12	10	0	0	30
1981	Balmain	6	1	0	0	3
1982–83	Illawarra	32	4	0	0	14
	Total	50	15	0	0	47
- Source: As of 27 February 2019

Malcolm Creevey (27 December 1956 – 10 August 1993) was an Australian professional rugby league footballer who played in the 1970s and 1980s. Creevey was a foundation player for Illawarra playing in the club's first season.

== Background ==
Creevey was born in Sydney, Australia and played his junior rugby league for Greenacre.

== Playing career ==
Creevey made his first grade debut for Canterbury against Newtown. Creevey played with Canterbury up until the end of the 1980 season and missed out on playing in the club's premiership victory over Eastern Suburbs in the 1980 NSWRL grand final.

In 1981, Creevey joined Balmain but it was an unsuccessful season for the club as they finished last on the table claiming the wooden spoon.

In 1982, Creevey joined newly admitted Illawarra and played in the club's first season featuring in 22 games. Creevey played a total of 32 games for Illawarra over 2 seasons.

== Death ==
Creevey was killed in a car accident outside a Perth hotel in August 1993.
