= Chris St. Clair (rugby league) =

Australian rugby league footballer

Personal information
- Full name: Christopher St. Clair
- Born: 29 June 1976 (age 48)

Playing information
- Position: Hooker, Second-row
Club
Years	Team	Pld	T	G	FG	P
1997–98	Balmain Tigers	7	0	0	0	0
Representative
Years	Team	Pld	T	G	FG	P
1998	Italy	2	0	0	0	0
- Source: As of 6 January 2023

Chris St. Clair is a former Italy international rugby league footballer who played in the 1990s. He played for Balmain in the ARL/NRL competition.

== Playing career ==
St. Clair made his first grade debut for Balmain in round 13 of the 1997 ARL season against Illawarra at WIN Stadium. He played off the bench in Balmain's 18-6 victory. St. Clair was limited to only three appearances for the club in 1997. In the 1998 NRL season, St. Clair made four appearances throughout the year. In the same year, St. Clair played one representative match for Italy against Lebanon at Leichhardt Oval and later played in game 3 of the 1999 Mediterranean Cup against France. After departing Balmain, St. Clair played for St Gaudens Bears in the French Elite One division and for York in England.
