= Sean McVean =

Australian rugby league footballer

Personal information
- Full name: Sean McVean
- Born: 13 October 1969 (age 55)

Playing information
- Position: Prop
Club
Years	Team	Pld	T	G	FG	P
1991–94	St. George Dragons	22	0	0	0	0
1995–96	Balmain Tigers	14	0	0	0	0
1997	Castleford	1	0	0	0	0
	Total	37	0	0	0	0
- Source: As of 9 February 2023

Sean McVean is an Australian former professional rugby league footballer who played in the 1990s. He played for St. George and Balmain in the New South Wales Rugby League (NSWRL) and ARL competitions. He also played for Castleford in the Super League.

== Playing career ==
McVean made his first grade debut for St. George in round 14 of the 1991 NSWRL season against Balmain at Adelaide Oval. He started at prop in the clubs 16–2 victory. In 1992, McVean played nine games including the clubs major preliminary semi-final loss to the Illawarra Steelers. St. George would recover from that loss to reach the grand final against Brisbane but McVean missed out on selection for the match.

In 1993, McVean was limited to only three games with the first grade side and made only two appearances in 1994. In 1995, McVean joined Balmain when they were briefly known as the "Sydney Tigers" and played their home matches at Parramatta Stadium. He would go on to play 14 games for the club. In 1997, McVean signed for English side Castleford but only made one appearance.
