= Jack Davis (rugby league) =

Australian rugby league footballer

Playing information
- Position: Fullback
Club
Years	Team	Pld	T	G	FG	P
1949–54	Balmain Tigers	36	3	64	0	137

Jack Davis was an Australian rugby league footballer.

A fullback, Davis was a good ball runner, sound defender and possessed a powerful kick. He made his first–grade debut for Balmain as a 19–year old in the 1949 season. In 1953, Davis contributed a club high 74 points off his boot, which included eight goals in a match against North Sydney.
