= Neil Pringle =

Australian rugby league footballer

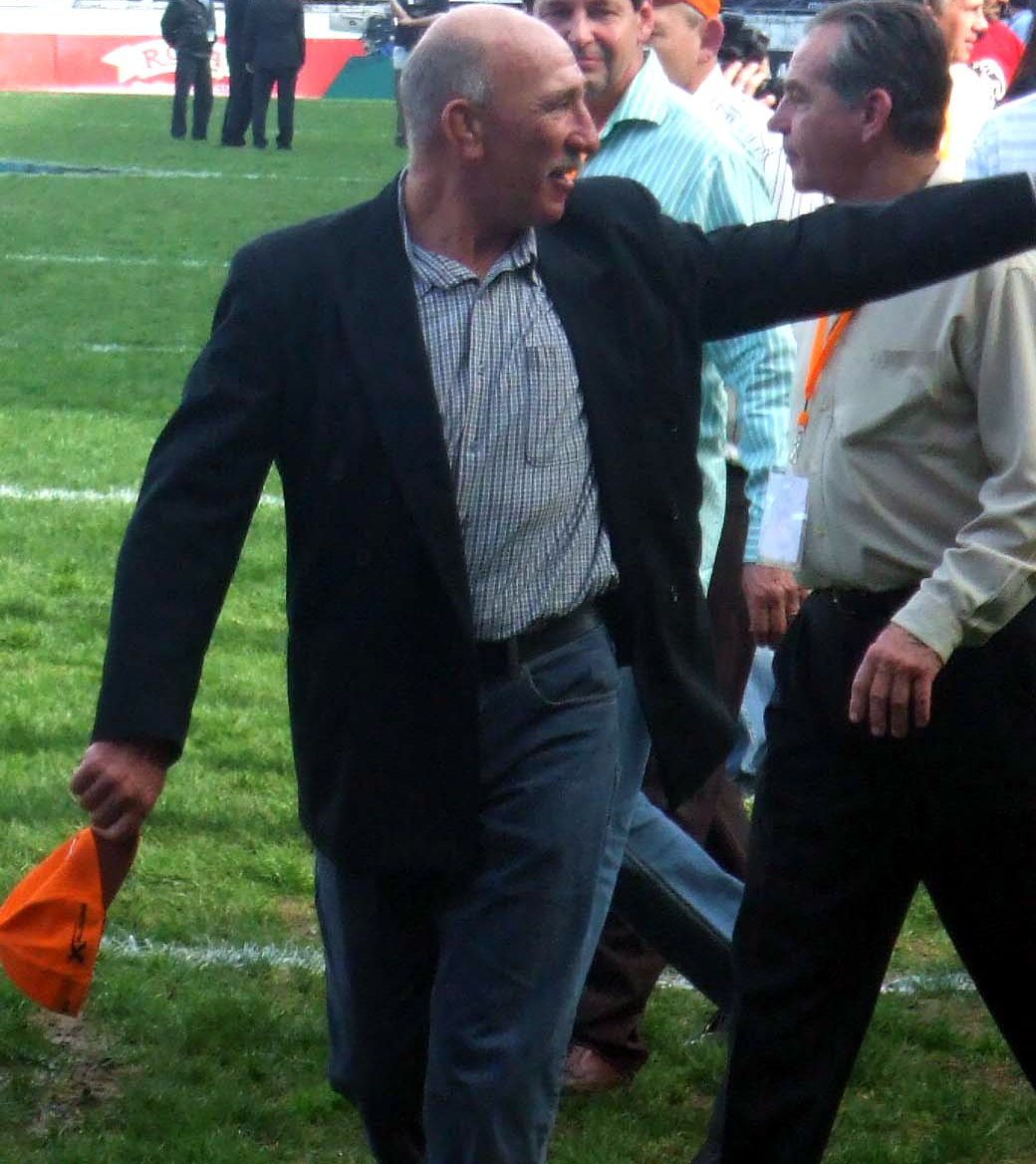

Personal information
- Full name: Neil Pringle
- Born: 20 July 1952 (age 72)

Playing information
- Position: Lock
Club
Years	Team	Pld	T	G	FG	P
1972–74	Newtown	64	18	0	0	54
1975–82	Balmain	107	28	0	0	84
	Total	171	46	0	0	138
Representative
Years	Team	Pld	T	G	FG	P
1972	New South Wales	1	0	0	0	0
1974	NSW City	1	0	0	0	0
- Source: Whiticker/Hudson

Neil Pringle (born 20 July 1952) is an Australian former professional rugby league footballer who played in the 1970s.

== Career ==
Pringle was a Newtown junior that was graded from their Presidents Cup team as a 15-year-old in 1967. He was playing first grade as a 20-year-old, and stayed with the Newtown club until the end of the 1974 NSWRFL season.

He moved to Balmain in 1975 and stayed there until his retirement from Sydney football at the conclusion of the 1982 season. During his Balmain years, Pringle is remembered for his brilliant combination with the international and fellow Balmain forward, Brian Lockwood.

Pringle finished his career as captain-coach of Cessnock Goannas.
