= Mal McMartin =

Australian rugby league footballer

Personal information
- Full name: Malcolm McMartin
- Born: 3 March 1944 (age 81)

Playing information
- Position: Centre, Wing
Club
Years	Team	Pld	T	G	FG	P
1968–71	Penrith Panthers	64	15	0	0	45
1972–73	Balmain	15	2	0	0	6
1974–75	Parramatta Eels	33	6	0	0	18
	Total	112	23	0	0	69

Malcolm "Mal" McMartin (born 1944) is an Australian former rugby league footballer who played in the 1960s and 1970s.

== Playing career ==
McMartin started his first grade career at the Penrith Panthers in 1968. He remained there for four seasons between 1968 and 1971. He then joined Balmain for two seasons between 1972 and 1973.

He finished his career at the Parramatta Eels for two seasons between 1974 and 1975 and often played with his identical twin brother, John McMartin.
