= Mark Luland =

Australian rugby league player

Personal information
- Full name: Mark Luland
- Born: 23 May 1980 (age 44); Sydney, New South Wales, Australia

Playing information
- Position: Wing
Club
Years	Team	Pld	T	G	FG	P
1999	Balmain Tigers	4	1	0	0	4

Mark Luland (/luːlənd/) (born 23 May 1980) is an Australian former professional rugby league footballer who played as a winger for the Balmain Tigers during the 1999 season.

== Playing career ==
Luland was graded by the now defunct Balmain Tigers in 1999. He made his first grade debut in his side's 20−16 victory over the Newcastle Knights at Leichhardt Oval in round 19 of the 1999 season. His final game of first grade came in the Tigers' 20−10 victory over the Parramatta Eels in round 24 of the 1999 season, Luland also scored his lone try in first grade in this match. The Tigers finished the season in 15th position and folded at the end of the season.

Luland was left out of the side for Balmain's final ever first grade game against the Canberra Raiders at Bruce Stadium. Balmain controversially merged with rivals the Western Suburbs Magpies to form the Wests Tigers as part of the NRL's rationalization strategy. Luland was not offered a contract to play with the newly formed team for the 2000 NRL season and subsequently never played first grade rugby league again.

After his departure from Balmain, Luland went on to play for the Balmain Ryde Eastwood Tigers and the Wentworthville Magpies in the New South Wales Cup competition.
