= Kevin Hardwick =

Australian rugby league footballer

Personal information
- Full name: Kevin Hardwick
- Born: 3 May 1962 (age 62)

Playing information
- Position: Second-row, Lock
Club
Years	Team	Pld	T	G	FG	P
1982–90	Balmain Tigers	145	9	1	0	36

Kevin Hardwick (born 3 May 1962) is an Australian former professional rugby league footballer who played in the 1980s and 1990s. He played for the Balmain Tigers and played at either second-row or lock.

== Playing career ==
Hardwick made his first grade debut for Balmain in round 5 1982 against South Sydney at Leichhardt Oval.

Hardwick played in two grand finals for Balmain in 1988 and 1989 but suffered heartbreak on both occasions, the latter of which has been described by many as one of the greatest grand finals ever.

Hardwick was a fan favourite at Balmain and was known for his mullet and moustache. His final game for the club was in Round 22 of the 1990 season against the Newcastle Knights.
