= John Woodward (rugby league) =

Australian rugby league footballer

Jon Woodward
Personal information
- Full name: Jonathan Woodward
- Born: 1886
- Died: 17 June 1954 (aged 67–68)

Playing information
- Position: Lock, Prop, Second-row
Club
Years	Team	Pld	T	G	FG	P
1908–13	Balmain	52	4	0	0	12
1915	North Sydney	11	0	0	0	0
	Total	63	4	0	0	12
Representative
Years	Team	Pld	T	G	FG	P
1910	New South Wales	1	0	0	0	0
- Source: As of 15 February 2019

Jon Woodward was an Australian rugby league footballer who played in the 1900s and 1910s. He played for Balmain and was a foundation player of the club. Woodward also played one season for North Sydney.

== Playing career ==
Woodward was a foundation player for Balmain in 1908 and competed in the club's first season which was also the first season of rugby league in Australia.

Woodward played with Balmain up until the end of 1913 and then joined North Sydney in 1915 playing 1 season for Norths before retiring.

Woodward played representative football for New South Wales in 1910 making 1 appearance against Queensland in the interstate series.

His brother, James Woodward also played first grade rugby league for Balmain and Annandale between 1911 and 1914.
