= Joe Apoloney =

Australian rugby league footballer

Joe Apolony
Personal information
- Full name: Joseph Nicholas Apolony
- Born: 25 December 1880 Gosford, New South Wales
- Died: 29 September 1952 (aged 71) Rozelle, New South Wales

Playing information
- Position: Second-row, Prop, Hooker
Club
Years	Team	Pld	T	G	FG	P
1908–12	Balmain	43	9	0	0	27
Representative
Years	Team	Pld	T	G	FG	P
1908	New South Wales	1	0	0	0	0
1908–09	Metropolis	2	0	0	0	0
- Source: As of 19 August 2019

Joe Apolony (1880-1952) was an Australian rugby league footballer who played in the 1900s and 1910s. He played for Balmain and was a foundation player of the club.

== Playing career ==
Apoloney made his first grade debut for Balmain against Western Suburbs on 20 April 1908 at Birchgrove Oval, which was the club's first ever game and also the opening week of the inaugural NSWRL competition. Balmain went on to win the match 24–0 in front of 3000 spectators.

Apoloney played with Balmain up until the end of the 1912 before retiring. Apoloney played representative football for New South Wales in 1909 and played 2 games for Metropolis which was the early version of the modern day NSW City team.
