= Shane O'Grady =

Australian rugby league footballer

Personal information
- Full name: Shane O'Grady
- Born: 1 May 1970 (age 56) Sydney, New South Wales, Australia

Playing information
- Position: Prop, Second-row
Club
Years	Team	Pld	T	G	FG	P
1991–92	Balmain Tigers	16	1	0	0	4
1993	Penrith Panthers	3	0	0	0	0
1999	Newcastle Knights	1	0	0	0	0
	Total	20	1	0	0	4
- Source: As of 15 January 2019

Shane O'Grady (born 1 May 1970) is an Australian former professional rugby league footballer who played in the 1990s. He played for the Balmain Tigers from 1991 to 1992, the Penrith Panthers in 1993 and finally the Newcastle Knights in 1999.
