= Lloyd Martin (rugby league) =

New Zealand rugby league footballer

Personal information
- Full name: Lloyd Martin
- Born: 18 July 1955 (age 71) Rotorua, New Zealand

Playing information
- Position: Five-eighth
Club
| Years | Team | Pld | T | G | FG | P |
|---|---|---|---|---|---|---|
| 1978–81 | Balmain Tigers | 30 | 8 | 0 | 0 | 24 |
| 1982–83 | Canberra Raiders | 23 | 2 | 0 | 0 | 6 |
| | Total | 53 | 10 | 0 | 0 | 30 |
- Source: As of 27 February 2019

Lloyd Martin (born 18 July 1958) is a New Zealand former professional rugby league footballer who played in the 1970s and 1980s. Martin played for Balmain and Canberra in the NSWRL competition. Martin was a foundation player for Canberra playing in the club's first ever game in 1982.

== Playing career ==
Martin began his first grade career with Balmain in 1978. Martin joined the club at a time when its fortunes were down and the side struggled towards the bottom of the ladder. Martin played up with Balmain until the end of the 1981 season which ended with the club finishing last and claiming the wooden spoon.

In 1982, Martin joined newly admitted Canberra and played in the club's first ever game, a 37–7 loss against the South Sydney Rabbitohs at Redfern Oval. Canberra would only go on to win 4 games in 1982 and suffered some heavy defeats throughout the season with the club ultimately finishing last on the table claiming the wooden spoon. As of 2026, this is the only time that Canberra has finished last.

Martin played on with Canberra in 1983 but only managed 1 further appearance before departing the club.

In 1985, Martin joined the Bega Roosters in the NSW Country competition. Martin played with Bega until the end of 1989. In his time there, Martin won 4 premierships with the club.
