= Balmain Tigers =

Australian rugby league football club

Club information
- Full name: Balmain Tigers Rugby League Football Club Limited
- Nickname: Tigers
- Colours: Gold; Black
- Founded: 23 January 1908 (foundation club)
- Exited: 1999 (started joint venture in 2000 with Western Suburbs Magpies to form Wests Tigers)

Former details
- Competition: NSWRL, ARL, NRL
- 1999: 15th of 17

Records
- Premierships: 11 – 1915, 1916, 1917, 1919, 1920, 1924, 1939, 1944, 1946, 1947, 1969
- Runners-up: 9 – 1909, 1936, 1945, 1948, 1956, 1964, 1966, 1988, 1989
- Minor premierships: 7 – 1915, 1916, 1917, 1919, 1920, 1924, 1939
- NSW Cup: 16 (1915, 1916, 1928, 1930, 1933, 1941, 1944, 1946, 1950, 1957, 1958, 1965, 1967, 1978, 1982, 1984)
- Wooden spoons: 4 – 1911, 1974, 1981, 1994

The Balmain Tigers (also known as the Sydney Tigers from 1995 to 1996) are a rugby league club based in the inner-western Sydney suburb of Balmain. They were a founding member of the New South Wales Rugby League and one of the most successful in the history of the premiership, with eleven titles. In 1999 they formed a joint venture club with the Western Suburbs Magpies club to form the Wests Tigers for competition in the National Rugby League (NRL). They no longer field any senior teams in the lower divisions. At the time of the joint venture only South Sydney Rabbitohs and the St George Dragons had won more titles than the Tigers.

The club's home grounds are at present Leichhardt Oval, in Lilyfield, and T.G Milner Sportsground, in Marsfield.

== History ==
=== Foundation club ===
In 1908, Australia's first season of rugby league began in Sydney and the Balmain club was one of nine foundation clubs. One of the club's founders was future Premier of New South Wales John Storey. Their home ground was Birchgrove Park. According to rugby codes historian Sean Fagan, early in 1908 a large number of Balmain rugby league supporters attended the annual general meeting of the local Balmain rugby union club, voting down every motion to elect a committee or form a union team for the season. The meeting had to be terminated and tensions boiled over into brawls outside the hall, during which one man was reportedly hospitalised with a knife wound.

Balmain reached their first Grand Final in only the second year in the competition against the previous year's champions, South Sydney, but would protest as the match was scheduled as a warm-up for a Kangaroos vs. Wallabies game at Souths' home ground. Even though both teams agreed to boycott the match, Souths turned up and were officially awarded the Premiership when they kicked off to an empty half of the field.

The distinctive black and gold colours of their 1908 thin striped jerseys, copied from the Balmain rugby union club, led their fans to first nickname them "The Tigers" in 1911. Though it is claimed they were also known as "The Watersiders" in the early days, this appears a moniker that was used by newspaper journalists rather than Balmain supporters and fans. It seemed to be used to refer not only to most Balmain sporting teams (Lacrosse, Rugby Union, Cricket etc.), but also to Balmain residents in general. The following boxing quote is a good example, taken from "Sydney Sportsman" 11 Dec, 1901. "On Xmas Eve, Cam Brookes and Ike Stewart, heavyweights, meet at the Golden Gate, Brookes is another Balmain boy, and the watersiders are sure to follow him to town in shoals." As late as the 1930s some journalists were still using both "Tigers" and "Watersiders" in the same article.

After a string of poor years, the Tigers managed a strong turn-around to become a dominant force in the Australian Rugby League with the club's first, second and third Premierships coming in successive years dominating the 1915, 1916 and 1917 seasons. Tigers dominance continued winning the 1919 and 1920 seasons comfortably. When they won the 1924 premiership this would be the last success for Balmain for over a decade to come.

=== Golden era ===
Balmain Premiers 1939 – Captain Sid Goodwin, Coach Bill Kelly

It would not be until 1939 the Tigers won back the Premiership smashing Souths 33–4. The weekend of the Final will also be remembered for the invasion of Poland by Germany which led to England and Australia going to War.

Post-World War II marked a golden era for Balmain with the Tigers reaching five consecutive Grand Finals winning three of them. In the 1944 Grand Final, the Tigers beat the strong favourites Newtown 19–16. Balmain reached the Grand Final again in 1945 but fell at the last hurdle against Easts 22-18. The loss was not long remembered as the Tigers went on to take out the next two seasons, beating St George 13–12 in 1946, and Canterbury 13–9 in 1947. On the hunt for a third successive title, they lost to Wests in 1948.

The Tigers' jerseys

1908–1914, 1997–1999

1925–1939

1940–1962

=== 1960s–1970s ===
Chart of yearly table positions for Balmain Tigers in First Grade Rugby League

The Tigers would appear in several Grand Final matches throughout the 1950s and 1960s but were just another victim to the mighty St. George Dragons eleven-year streak of Premiership wins in this period, losing in 1956, 1964 and 1966. When the Tigers did take out the competition in the 1969 NSWRFL season it was a classy 11–2 defeat of favourites Souths who boasted 11 internationals, this would signal the last time Balmain would ever win a Grand Final. The side was captained by Peter Provan, brother of Norm, and coached by Leo Nosworthy.

The 1970s were not a great era for the Tigers. The wooden spoon had not been in Balmain since 1911, but it returned in club history when the Tigers won only 4 games and had 2 draws in 1974 following several poor years. In 1976, things looked more hopeful when Balmain began the year with an undefeated run through the pre-season "Wills Cup" competition. The side also won the 1976 Amco Cup knockout tournament in front of a then-record crowd of 21,600, beating North Sydney. The Tigers won eight straight games and led the competition, but a midseason slump left the Tigers in the same position as in 1975 and they failed to make the finals.

=== 1980s–1990s ===
The Tigers consistently made the finals series in the 1980s reaching the play-offs in 1983, 1985, 1986, 1987, 1988 and 1989.

On 4 August 1985 a crowd of 21,707 set a new ground record for Leichhardt Oval.

In 1986, one of Balmain's players, Great Britain captain Garry Schofield topped the try-scorers list for the season. The 1988 Great Britain Lions tour captain Ellery Hanley was signed by the Balmain Tigers to play the remaining rounds of the 1988 NSWRFL season for them once his representative commitments were fulfilled. The Tigers reached the 1988 Grand Final, the first time since the 1969 success, winning a lot of fans along the way with a number of 'backs to the wall' performances winning four consecutive sudden death matches in just 3 weeks. The top five teams out of the premiership table went on to the final series, and this was the first time since 1979 that a team in fifth position had progressed to the Grand Final. In 1988 the Tigers were deemed certain to miss the finals with 8 games left in the regular season. The Tigers remarkably only lost a single game from that point onwards reaching the Grand Final against Canterbury, only to be denied the trophy in a controversial 24–12 loss. Canterbury player, Terry Lamb, is still remembered by fans for knocking out the legendary Ellery Hanley with a high shot in back play midway through the first half. The Tigers were leading the game at the time.

The side would again make the Grand Final in 1989 but this time as favourites. In a controversial affair, the side lost in extra time against the Canberra Raiders after being ahead 12–2 at half time.

After the heartbreak of the 1989 Grand Final, the Tigers never regained their dominating form (although they did make the finals again in 1990) and went through a rebuilding phase following the retirement of star players Wayne Pearce, Garry Jack, Steve Roach and David Brooks who had all played over 100 games for the club over a period of 10 years or more. The stars were missed as Balmain finished second-last in 1993 and got the wooden spoon in 1994.

The departure of coach Warren Ryan at the end of 1990 was a key turning point for the club. Balmain hired the famous former Wallabies coach-come-radio announcer Alan Jones as a coach in 1991. As Paul Sironen admitted years later in his autobiography, the 'running rugby' style of Jones was too simplistic for the structured defensive patterns which had developed in rugby league during the 1980s. Jones also began a controversial clear-out of some of the other Tigers stars who had not retired, notably the Kiwi international Gary Freeman. By the time Jones was sacked as coach at the end of 1993, incoming coach Wayne Pearce inherited a massive problem which was only getting worse.

In drastic action, Balmain released 21 players at the end of 1994 and moved to Parramatta Stadium as the 'Sydney Tigers'. The Tigers stayed at Parramatta Stadium for two seasons before heading back to Leichhardt Oval. The Tigers only averaged 6,565 people attending home games at Parramatta Stadium in what was regarded as a failed experiment.

At the end of the 1996 ARL season, the League's chief executive John Quayle resigned and was replaced by Balmain president (and former hooker) Neil Whittaker.

=== Joint Venture ===
Although things picked up for the club in following years, the Australian Rugby League/Super League war would spell trouble for the club. 1999 was a tumultuous year for the Balmain Tigers. The season began with a dark cloud hanging over the 17 clubs. The Super League/ARL compromise had left 1999 as the last season before the 14 team NRL competition began and with it came the much talked about criteria. On-field Balmain was struggling with a savage injury toll that forced the Tigers to use over 40 players throughout the season.

In July 1999, the option of forming a joint venture with fellow foundation club, the Western Suburbs Magpies was put to the Football Club members. The members ultimately voted in favour of a joint venture. As it turned out Balmain was in the top 14 clubs under the criteria (ahead of current NRL teams Penrith and South Sydney) but would have continued to struggle to be financially competitive with bigger clubs. The decision to enter a joint venture saw a crowd of 15,240 turn-out in atrocious conditions to watch the Tigers play their last home game in first grade at Leichhardt Oval as the Balmain Tigers.

Balmain's final game in the top grade as a sole entity was in Round 26 1999 against the Canberra Raiders at Bruce Stadium which ended in a 42–14 defeat. At the time of the club's exit, Balmain were the third most successful club in the competition's history with eleven premierships. Only St. George and South Sydney had won more premierships.

The new entity, Wests Tigers, made it to the 2005 NRL Grand Final and defeated the North Queensland Cowboys 30–16.

=== Club today ===
The club currently competes in both of the junior New South Wales Rugby League competitions, the Harold Matthews Cup and S. G. Ball Cup competitions, recording consecutive SG Ball premierships in 2012–13. From 2000, they played in the NSW Cup as a merged team with the Ryde-Eastwood Hawks and competed as the Balmain Ryde-Eastwood Tigers. From season 2013 onwards, Balmain does not have a senior representative side, having formed a joint venture with the Western Suburbs Magpies to form a Wests Tigers team.

In October 2018, it was reported that the Balmain Leagues Club was placed into voluntary administration placing the future of the Balmain side at risk. It was also revealed that Balmain was required to pay a $2.5 million loan to the NRL by November 2021. The report followed on from the news that for over 10 years the leagues club at Rozelle had sat dormant as different shareholders and developers struggled to negotiate deals on what to do with the land. Both the Harold Matthews Cup and S. G. Ball Cup Balmain sides who still compete were reportedly not to be in any danger in the short-term future.

On 21 March 2019, it was revealed that Wests Ashfield accepted responsibility for the Balmain club's outstanding loan to the NRL. Inner West Mayor Darcy Byrne said of the news "The Tigers were about to become extinct, but the club can now continue as a rugby league entity and to be a partner in Wests Tigers for many decades to come".

On 24 August 2019, a Deed of Amalgamation was issued between Wests Ashfield and Balmain Tigers. Under the deed, Ashfield will clear all outstanding debts to the NRL, will continue to fund Balmain Tigers Rugby League for a number of years and will pursue all avenues to re-open a venue on the Rozelle Premises.

On 29 August 2024, it was reported in the media that Balmain directors had called a crisis meeting with the intention of splitting from their merger arrangement with Western Suburbs. It was stated that there was frustrations and concerns relating to decisions made by the Holman Barnes Group (HBG) - majority owner of the Wests Tigers. One of the Balmain directors, Garry Leo stated he had “lost faith in them" referring to the Western Suburbs side. Leo went on to state “I really believe the time has come for us to step aside and resurrect the Balmain Tigers, We’re getting Leichhardt Oval upgraded and we could play there every second week. If we can find the right backers, we want a shot at returning to the NRL". The following day, Danny Stapleton one of the other board members stated that Balmain were 100% committed to the merger and the reports were not true. Former Balmain player Benny Elias also spoke with the media calling for Leo to be sacked.

In December 2024, it was reported in the media that certain factions of the Balmain club wanted to split from the merger with Western Suburbs to form a partnership with the prospective South Island Kea team.

== Balmain Leagues Club ==
The Balmain Leagues Club, the operating business was built in 1957. The original site was situated on the corner of Victoria Road and Darling Street, Rozelle. The club was the venue for a celebration party after Wests Tigers won the NRL Premiership in 2005.

The Leagues Club closed its doors on 28 March 2010, with the former club site now vacant after receiving a notice to vacate the site to make way for the proposed Rozelle Village development to go ahead.

Balmain Leagues Club entered voluntary administration on 26 October 2018.

In September 2019, members of both Balmain Leagues Club and Wests Ashfield Leagues club voted almost unanimously for an amalgamation to take place. Once ratified by office of Liquor and Gaming, Balmain Leagues Club will cease to exist.

== Coaching register ==
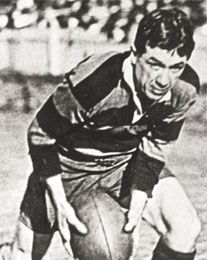
Pony Halloway player and coach.

No.	Name	Years	G	W	D	L	%	Finals	Premierships	Runners-up	Minor Premierships	Wooden spoons
1	Robert Graves	1908–1913	76	33	2	41	43%	1909	–	1909	–	1911
2	Bill Kelly	1914–1915, 1938–1943	120	73	11	35	61%	1938, 1939, 1941, 1942, 1943	1915, 1939	–	1915, 1939,	–
3	Arthur Halloway	1916–1920	75	57	3	15	76%	1916	1916, 1917, 1919, 1920	–	1916, 1917, 1919, 1920	–
4	Charles Fraser	1921–1924 & 1932	79	45	7	27	57%	1924, 1932	1924	–	1924	–
5	Alf Fraser	1925–1929	74	28	4	42	38%	–	–	–	–	–
6	Reg Latta	1929, 1931	30	11	1	18	37%	–	–	–	–	–
7	Norm Robinson	1930, 1944–1947, 1954–1956	143	84	9	50	59%	1944, 1945, 1946, 1947, 1956	1944, 1946, 1947	1945, 1956	–	–
8	Cec Fifield	1930	14	5	2	7	36%	–	–	–	–	–
9	George Robinson	1933–1934	28	9	3	16	32%	–	–	–	–	–
10	Joe Busch	1935–1936	31	18	1	12	58%	1936	–	1936	–	–
11	Harold Matthews	1937	8	4	0	4	50%	–	–	–	–	–
12	Athol Smith	1948–1950	60	37	6	17	62%	1948, 1949, 1950	–	1948	–	–
13	Jim Duckworth	1951	18	6	0	12	33%	–	–	–	–	–
14	Arthur Patton	1952–1953	36	15	0	21	42%	–	–	–	–	–
15	Sid Ryan	1957	18	9	0	9	50%	–	–	–	–	–
16	John O'Toole	1958–1960	59	29	1	29	49%	1958, 1960	–	–	–	–
17	Harry Bath	1961–1966	117	65	3	49	56%	1961, 1963, 1964, 1966	–	1964, 1966	–	–
18	Keith Barnes	1967–1968	46	28	2	16	61%	–	–	–	–	–
19	Leo Nosworthy	1969–1973	113	55	2	56	49%	1969	1969	–	–	–
20	Alan Mason	1974	22	4	2	16	18%	–	–	–	–	1974
21	Paul Broughton	1975–1976	45	22	2	21	49%	1975	–	–	–	–
22	Ron Willey	1977–1979	68	35	4	29	52%	1977	–	–	–	–
23	Dennis Tutty	1980	22	7	0	15	32%	–	–	–	–	–
24	Frank Stanton	1981–1986	152	78	2	72	51%	1983, 1985, 1986	–	–	–	1981
25	Bill Anderson	1987	25	14	1	10	56%	1987	–	–	–	–
26	Warren Ryan	1988–1990	76	50	1	25	66%	1988, 1989, 1990	–	1988, 1989	–	–
27	Alan Jones	1991–1993	66	24	3	39	36%	–	–	–	–	–
28	Wayne Pearce	1994–1999	136	49	1	86	36%	–	–	–	–	1994

== Players of note ==
In May 2003 the Balmain Tigers Team of the Century was named:

- Keith Barnes (c)
- Arthur Halloway
- Ben Elias
- Larry Corowa
- Wayne Pearce
- Tom Bourke
- Arthur Patton
- Paul Sironen
- Tim Brasher
- Charles Fraser
- Harry Bath
- Peter Provan
- Jim Craig
- Steve Roach
- Bob Boland
- Pat Devery
- Arthur Beetson
- Norm "Latchem" Robinson
- Gary Freeman

2005 the members of the Team of the Century became the inaugural inductees to the Balmain Tigers Hall of Fame. In addition to those inductees, a further five were inducted at the inaugural Hall of Fame dinner on 17 March 2005. These were:

- Reg Latta
- Joe Jorgenson
- Bill Marsh
- Dave Bolton
- Garry Jack

A further five were inducted at the Hall of Fame dinner on 29 March 2006. These were:

- Jack 'Junker' Robinson
- Fred de Belin
- Billy Bischoff
- Garry Leo
- John Spencer

A further five were inducted at the Hall of Fame dinner on 20 March 2007. These were:

- Trevor Ryan
- Geoff Starling
- David Brooks
- Bob Craig
- Sid Goodwin

A further six were inducted at the Hall of Fame dinner in 2008. These were:

- John Davidson
- Laurie Fagan
- Jack Hampstead
- Bob Mara
- Neil Pringle
- Sid Ryan

A further four were inducted in 2009:

- Jack Spencer
- Len Killeen
- Keith Outten
- Kerry Hemsley

== Stadiums ==
The Tigers have had several 'Home game grounds' used in the club's history. The club spent a majority of the early days at Birchgrove Oval (1908 – 1933, and in 1942), with short stints at Wentworth Park (1930) and at Drummoyne Oval (1932–1933) in that time.

In 1934, they moved to Leichhardt Oval, where the majority played until they merged with the Western Suburbs Magpies at the end of the 1999 season. In this time, they had short stints at Sydney Showground (1971–1972) and Parramatta Stadium (1995–1996).

The clubs' existing lower grade sides play home games at Leichhardt Oval and TG Milner Sportsground in Marsfield.

Here is a list of their grounds used as their primary use in first grade:

- Birchgrove Oval (1908–1929; 1931–1932; 1942)
- Wentworth Park (1930)
- Drummoyne Oval (1932–1933)
- Leichhardt Oval (1934–1941; 1943–1970; 1973–1994; 1997–1999)
- Sydney Sports Ground (1971–1972)
- Parramatta Stadium (1995–1996)

== Records ==
=== Biggest Wins vs All Teams ===
Margin	Score	Opposition	Venue	Date
62	64–2	Western Suburbs	Pratten Park	29 July 1944
57	57–0	University	Birchgrove Oval	23 April 1921
51	59–8	Eastern Suburbs	Leichhardt Oval	23 August 1952
44	46–2	Gold Coast Seagulls	Seagulls Stadium	23 June 1990
43	43–0	Annandale	Birchgrove Oval	3 June 1918
42	45–3	Newtown	Birchgrove Oval	4 August 1923
41	46–5	Penrith Panthers	Penrith Park	20 July 1980
39	44–5	Canterbury Bulldogs	Leichhardt Oval	4 May 1935
36	43–7	South Sydney	Leichhardt Oval	27 July 1946
35	35–0	Canberra Raiders	Leichhardt Oval	9 May 1982
34	37–3; 34–0	North Sydney	Birchgrove Oval; Leichhardt Oval	19 May 1917; 29 April 1939
33	47–14	Parramatta Eels	Leichhardt Oval	2 August 1947
32	39–7; 34–2	St. George Dragons	Leichhardt Oval; Leichhardt Oval	7 May 1938; 31 May 1947
31	40–9	Glebe	Birchgrove Oval	21 July 1917
26	46–20	Illawarra Steelers	Leichhardt Oval	19 March 1983
24	32–8; 34–10	Cronulla Sharks	Leichhardt Oval; Caltex Field	31 March 1985; 5 July 1992
22	38–16	North Queensland Cowboys	Parramatta Stadium	26 March 1995
20	24–4	Newcastle Knights	Leichhardt Oval	28 April 1990
18	24–6	Brisbane Broncos	Leichhardt Oval	30 July 1989
18	32–14	South Queensland Crushers	Leichhardt Oval	10 August 1997
17	17–0; 26–9	Manly Sea Eagles	Leichhardt Oval; Sydney Sports Ground	26 July 1947; 12 May 1968
12	16–4	Cumberland	Birchgrove Oval	20 June 1908
12	34–22	Auckland Warriors	Lancaster Park	16 June 1996
10	16–6	Melbourne Storm	Leichhardt Oval	13 March 1999
4	9–5	Newcastle	Birchgrove Oval	15 May 1909
4	10–6	Western Reds	Parramatta Stadium	27 April 1996
–	–	Adelaide Rams	–	–
–	–	St. George Illawarra Dragons	–	–

=== Biggest Losses vs All Teams ===
Margin	Score	Opposition	Venue	Date
57	5–62	Western Suburbs Magpies	Lidcombe Oval	31 March 1974
52	0–52	Adelaide Rams	Hindmarsh Stadium	3 July 1998
52	12–64	North Sydney Bears	North Sydney Oval	30 May 1999
50	0–50	Brisbane Broncos	ANZ Stadium	13 August 1993
46	10–56	Manly Sea Eagles	Parramatta Stadium	6 August 1995
44	0–44	Cronulla Sharks	Shark Park	7 March 1999
41	0–41	St. George Dragons	Sydney Cricket Ground	7 August 1965
40	13–53	Eastern Suburbs	Sydney Cricket Ground	31 August 1935
40	8–48	St. George Illawarra Dragons	WIN Stadium	22 May 1999
39	2–41	Glebe	Wentworth Park	19 August 1911
39	13–52	Canterbury Bulldogs	Leichhardt Oval	20 April 1981
37	2–39	South Sydney Rabbitohs	Redfern Oval	20 April 1975
36	2–38	Parramatta Eels	Belmore Sports Ground	13 June 1982
36	0–36	Canberra Raiders	Leichhardt Oval	9 July 1994
34	12–46	Newcastle Knights	Parramatta Stadium	2 April 1995
32	4–36	Newtown	Henson Park	6 April 1974
29	12–41	Penrith Panthers	Penrith Football Stadium	18 August 1991
26	6–32	Gold Coast Seagulls	Seagulls Stadium	31 July 1994
26	6–32	Illawarra Steelers	Steelers Stadium	13 August 1995
24	12–36	Auckland Warriors	Ericsson Stadium	4 June 1995
24	2–26	North Queensland Cowboys	Malanda Stadium	21 March 1998
23	5–28	Newcastle	Birchgrove Oval	4 July 1908
16	6–22	Western Reds	WACA Ground	14 April 1995
11	5–16	University	Birchgrove Oval	16 June 1928
9	7–16	Annandale	Birchgrove Oval	5 July 1913
9	16–25	Melbourne Storm	Leichhardt Oval	7 June 1998
–	–	Cumberland	–	–
–	–	South Queensland Crushers	–	–

=== Individual ===
Most appearances

- Paul Sironen: 247 (1985–1998)
- Garry Jack: 243 (1982–1992, 1995)
- Ben Elias: 233 (1982–1994)
- Keith Barnes: 194 (1955–1968)
- Wayne Pearce: 192 (1980–1990)
- Charles Fraser: 185 (1910–1926)
- Steve Roach: 185 (1982–1992)
- Tim Brasher: 185 (1989–1997)
- Reg Latta: 175 (1916–1926, 1928–1930)
- David Brooks: 174 (1983–1992)

Most tries in a match

- Sid Goodwin: 5 vs University at Leichhardt Oval on 4 April 1935
- Arthur Patton: 5 vs Eastern Suburbs at SCG on 12 August 1944
- Bob Lulham: 5 vs Parramatta at Leichhardt Oval on 2 August 1947
- David Topliss: 5 vs Newtown at Henson Park on 7 August 1977

Most tries in a season

- Bobby Lulham: 28 in NSWRFL season 1947

Most tries for club

- Arthur Patton: 95
- Sid Goodwin: 86
- Bob Lulham: 85
- Tim Brasher: 82
- Jack 'Junker' Robinson: 78
- Bob Mara: 70

Most goals in a match

- Frank Dreise: 11 vs Wests at Pratten Park on 29 July 1944
- Keith Barnes: 11 vs Norths at Sydney Sports Ground on 24 July 1960

Most goals in a season

- Len Killeen: 84 in NSWRFL season 1969

Most Goals For Club

- Keith Barnes: 742

Most points in a match

- Frank Dreise: 22 vs Wests at Pratten Park on 29 July 1944
- Keith Barnes: 22 vs Norths at Sydney Sports Ground on 24 July 1960
- Ross Conlon: 22 vs Wests at Leichhardt Oval on 4 April 1985

Most points in a season

- Len Killeen: 207 (9 tries, 84 goals, 6 field goals) in NSWRFL season 1969

Most points for club

- Keith Barnes: 1,519 (11 tries, 742 goals, 1 field goal)

Award winners

- Wayne Pearce (Rothmans Medal, 1985)

== Honours ==
- Premierships (1915, 1916, 1917, 1919, 1920, 1924, 1939, 1944, 1946, 1947, 1969)
- Runners Up (1909, 1936, 1945, 1948, 1956, 1964, 1966, 1988, 1989)
- City Cup (1917, 1923)
- Craven Mild Cup (1967, 1976)
- Amco Cup (1976, 1985, 1987)

== Major sponsors ==
- Camperford (1977)
- Avis (1978–1980)
- Sharp (1981–1982)
- Saxonvale Wines (1983–1985)
- Alpha Micro Computers (1986–1987)
- Philips (1988–1993)
- MLC mobiles (1994–1995)
- Meriton Apartments (1997–1999)

== Notable fans ==
- Dawn Fraser, Olympic swimmer
- Anthony Field, founding member of The Wiggles
- John Kerr, 18th Governor General of Australia
- Laurie Nichols
- Harry Triguboff
- Neville Wran, 35th Premier of New South Wales

== First-grade players (1908–1999) ==
Club							
No.	Name	Career	Appearances	Tries	Goals	Field goals	Points
1	Joe Apoloney	1908–1912	43	9	0	0	27
2	A Bryant	1908	4	0	0	0	0
3	Alf Dobbs	1908–1909	6	3	0	0	9
4	W Fisher	1908–1909	6	3	0	0	9
5	G Fitzgerald	1908–1910	30	5	27	1	71
6	Robert Graves	1908–1913	54	12	1	0	38
7	Alf Latta	1908–1912	41	8	10	1	46
8	Ted McFadden	1908–1910	33	1	0	0	3
9	Tommy O'Donnell	1908–1910	20	3	0	0	9
10	Joe Regent	1908–1909	20	7	6	0	33
11	A Walker	1908–1910	27	6	0	0	18
12	A Ward	1908	8	0	0	0	0
13	George Wilcox	1908	9	2	0	0	6
14	Martin Laidlaw	1908–1909	9	1	0	0	3
15	Barrell	1908	1	0	0	0	0
16	James Smellie	1908	1	0	0	0	0
17	Pat Carroll	1908	1	0	0	0	0
18	T Smith	1908–1909	5	1	1	0	5
19	Fred Woolley	1908–1910	25	0	0	0	0
20	A Davidson	1908	2	0	0	0	0
21	John Woodward	1908–1913	52	4	0	0	12
22	W Davis	1909	1	0	0	0	0
23	J Davidson	1909–1911	3	0	0	0	0
24	Lloyd Edwards	1909–1910	21	2	0	0	6
25	S Moore	1909	5	3	0	0	9
26	F Ward	1909–1911	27	1	0	0	3
27	H Jones	1909–1912	8	1	0	0	3
28	Arthur Halloway	1909–1911, 1915–1920	108	47	0	0	141
29	J Jackson	1909	1	0	0	0	0
30	Black	1909–1910	2	1	2	0	7
31	Horace Balkwell	1910–1916	66	3	1	1	13
32	Bob Craig	1910–1919	92	14	2	0	46
33	Nutts	1910	1	0	0	0	0
34	W. Smith	1910	12	5	1	0	17
35	Frank Woodward	1910	9	0	0	0	0
36	Arthur Surridge	1910	4	1	5	0	13
37	Lane	1910	1	0	0	0	0
38	F Cox	1910	5	0	0	0	0
39	W Franklin	1910	2	1	0	0	3
40	Stuart	1910	2	0	0	0	0
41	Charles Fraser	1910–1926	185	54	163	2	492
42	Lloyd Boyd	1910	2	1	0	0	3
43	Ted McGuinness	1910	1	0	0	0	0
44	F McKay	1910	2	1	0	0	3
45	Len Sawyer	1910–1913	4	0	0	0	0
46	Jack Hickey	1911	10	0	13	0	26
47	D Hilliard	1911	12	1	4	0	11
48	Owen McCarthy	1911	13	0	0	0	0
49	W McKay	1911	3	0	0	0	0
50	Charles McMurtrie	1911–1915	15	4	0	0	12
51	T Nolan	1911	1	0	0	0	0
52	R Smith	1911	2	0	0	0	0
53	B Wright	1911	14	7	0	0	21
54	C Stewart	1911–1912	3	1	0	0	3
55	James Woodward	1911–1912	11	0	0	0	0
56	Tommy Anderson	1911	2	0	0	0	0
57	W Kirk	1911	8	1	2	0	7
58	Gus Widmer	1911	4	1	0	0	4
59	M Jacobsen	1911	5	0	0	0	0
60	J King	1911	4	0	0	0	0
61	W Boyd	1911	1	0	0	0	0
62	J Johnson	1911	4	0	0	0	0
63	Frank Moore	1911–1914	36	3	2	1	15
64	E Rodney	1911–1912	5	0	0	0	0
65	H Murphy	1911–1915	11	4	0	0	12
66	George Cummins	1912–1915	57	8	50	0	124
67	William Geoghegan	1912	11	1	0	0	3
68	William Hilliard	1912	13	3	2	0	13
69	Albert Johnston	1912–1917	76	6	2	0	22
70	Lyall Wall	1912, 1914–1919	81	6	35	6	100
71	A Wheatley	1912–1913, 1915	25	1	0	0	3
72	George Wheatley	1912–1913	22	3	0	0	9
73	Angus Lennon	1912	5	2	0	0	6
74	Alf Liston	1912	1	0	0	0	0
75	J Dooley	1912	6	1	0	0	3
76	Jack Robinson	1912–1925	156	78	5	0	244
77	L Eyles	1913	1	0	0	0	0
78	Robert Fraser	1913	2	0	0	0	0
79	H Judge	1913	3	0	0	0	0
80	Bill Noble	1913	14	0	0	0	0
81	Ernie Hucker	1913	7	1	0	0	3
82	P Burns	1913–1914	22	6	0	0	18
83	George Potter	1913–1916, 1918–1921	48	24	3	0	78
84	Anthony Harrington	1913	7	0	4	0	8
85	D Cranston	1913–1916	25	1	1	0	5
86	Bill Schultz	1913–1924	142	15	0	0	45
87	P Gehrig	1913	1	0	0	0	0
88	P Spears	1913	1	0	0	0	0
89	W Green	1914–1915	15	1	3	0	9
90	Bill Kelly	1914–1915	27	16	0	0	48
91	McLaren	1914	1	0	0	0	0
92	Jack Blinco	1914–1915	25	1	0	0	3
93	H French	1914	4	0	0	0	0
94	Herbert Johnson	1914	4	2	0	0	6
95	W Winning	1914	3	0	0	0	0
96	James Brassill	1915–1918	21	9	0	0	27
97	C Scanlon	1915	1	0	0	0	0
98	George Robinson	1915–1928	85	24	44	0	160
99	Edward Burnicle	1915–1918	31	4	0	0	12
100	Jim Craig	1915–1921	51	20	22	0	104
101	Alf Fraser	1916–1925	129	15	0	0	45
102	Reg Latta	1916–1930	175	62	1	0	188
103	E Miller	1916	4	1	0	0	3
104	C Mackey	1916–1917	3	0	0	0	0
105	J Ashley	1916	4	0	1	0	2
106	Roy Algie	1916	1	0	0	0	0
107	Con Croghan	1916-1917	5	2	0	0	6
108	R Hough	1916	1	0	0	0	0
109	D Stewart	1916	7	0	0	0	0
110	R Proust	1917–1920	32	9	0	0	27
111	Horrie Watt	1917–1925	93	11	3	0	39
112	R Miller	1917–1919	37	7	36	0	93
113	Paddy Conaghan	1917–1920, 1924	35	19	1	0	59
114	George Challis	1918	10	0	0	0	0
115	G Kensey	1918	11	0	0	0	0
116	Billy Ryan	1918–1920	12	6	0	0	18
117	H Hall	1918	3	1	0	0	3
118	Jim Love	1918–1927	90	23	0	0	69
119	Mick Russell	1919–1924	65	10	89	0	208
120	Frank Maguire	1919	1	0	0	0	0
121	Edward Cummings	1919–1920	19	1	0	0	3
122	Joe Bennett	1919	1	0	0	0	0
123	C Chapman	1919	1	0	0	0	0
124	C Russell	1920–1923	9	0	0	0	0
125	Dally Brien	1920–1926	7	9	0	0	27
126	Syd Denham	1920–1922	2	0	0	0	0
127	Roy Liston	1921–1922, 1924	18	2	8	0	22
128	Bill Lucas	1921–1922	24	3	0	0	9
129	Tom McGuinness	1921–1922	10	1	0	0	3
130	Henry Pidcock	1921–1922	15	3	0	0	9
131	Joe Thetheway	1922	3	0	0	0	0
132	Billy Craig	1922–1925	40	11	0	0	33
133	Frank O'Rourke	1922	1	0	0	0	0
134	Sid Peters	1922	2	0	0	0	0
135	Syd Greenless	1922–1923	10	0	0	0	0
136	Dud Millard	1922–1926	48	13	1	0	41
137	William Coonan	1922–1923	9	2	0	0	6
138	Charles York	1922–1927	4	2	0	0	6
139	Des Ponchard	1922–1929	58	1	38	0	79
140	E.B. Cox	1922	2	1	0	0	3
141	Charles Cuneo	1923	10	1	1	0	5
142	Les Hayes	1923–1926	45	7	0	0	21
143	Tommy Kennedy	1923–1926	35	24	0	0	72
144	S Bell	1923	1	1	0	0	3
145	George Bishop	1923–1935	81	10	22	0	74
146	G O'Halloran	1924	3	0	0	0	0
147	Fred Ferguson	1924–1927	28	1	0	0	3
148	Norm Robinson	1924–1933	72	19	22	0	101
149	Jack Cuneen	1925	10	0	0	0	0
150	Ray Elliott	1925–1929	58	7	0	0	21
151	Frank McMillan	1925	12	0	17	0	34
152	A Latta	1925–1926	14	2	0	0	6
153	T Slattery	1925	8	0	0	0	0
154	C Bell	1925	2	0	0	0	0
155	Jack Dawson	1926	5	0	0	0	0
156	Bill Maizey	1926–1927	27	3	17	0	43
157	R Rue	1926–1927	7	1	0	0	3
158	F Ross	1926	7	2	0	0	6
159	Tony Russell	1926–1929	39	10	10	0	50
160	A Nicholls	1926	3	0	0	0	0
161	T Newby	1926	3	0	0	0	0
162	W O'Shea	1926	4	0	7	0	14
163	Bill Wiggins	1926–1929	39	2	0	0	6
164	Leo Abberton	1926	2	0	0	0	0
165	J Reeves	1926	7	1	0	0	3
166	Arthur Tennant	1926–1929	19	0	0	0	0
167	Alfred Wincote	1926–1929	28	3	0	0	9
168	J Cairns	1926–1928	10	1	0	0	3
169	Reg Snowball	1926	1	0	0	0	0
170	J O'Connell	1926	6	3	0	0	9
171	J Goodwin	1927–1931	5	0	8	0	16
172	Charlie Roberts	1927–1933	59	20	15	0	90
173	C Wellings	1927	3	0	0	0	0
174	Anthony McFadden	1927–1929	30	1	30	0	63
175	Walter McGreal	1927	7	0	0	0	0
176	Les Moore	1927–1931	44	10	0	0	30
177	Wal Maizey	1927–1931	42	8	0	0	24
178	H Rolfe	1927	1	0	0	0	0
179	Gordon Robinson	1928–1929	4	0	0	0	0
180	Dudley Fitzpatrick	1927–1929	17	6	0	0	18
181	T Barnes	1927	1	0	0	0	0
182	F O'Brien	1928–1929	12	6	0	0	18
183	Jim Pritchard	1928–1931	25	5	15	0	45
184	T Spooner	1928	3	1	0	0	3
185	Andy Nicol	1928–1932	19	1	0	0	3
186	Jim Duckworth	1928–1938	45	14	33	0	108
187	J Randall	1928	1	0	0	0	0
188	Gerald Fitzpatrick	1928–1933	2	0	0	0	0
189	Vern Deacon	1929	14	8	0	0	24
190	F Matthews	1929	10	0	0	0	0
191	Vic Reeves	1929–1931	28	2	0	0	6
192	Jack Chin	1929–1930	11	3	14	0	37
193	Jack Folkard	1929–1930	10	0	5	0	10
194	Ron Hoyle	1929	1	0	0	0	0
195	Doug Vannon	1929	3	1	2	0	7
196	S Edmonds	1929	1	0	0	0	0
197	George Frankland	1929–1936	76	27	0	0	81
198	Tom Magnus	1929–1933	15	3	1	0	11
199	R Brennan	1929	2	1	0	0	3
200	H Robson	1929	1	0	0	0	0
201	Syd Christensen	1930–1937	63	42	185	0	496
202	Cec Fifield	1930	5	0	0	0	0
203	S Martin	1930–1932	27	3	0	0	9
204	George Mullins	1930–1932	13	3	4	0	17
205	Charlie Richards	1930–1940	64	4	0	0	12
206	Stan Donegan	1930	5	4	0	0	12
207	Alby Black	1930–1931	24	11	0	0	33
208	Mal Fallon	1930–1934	53	9	32	0	91
209	John Alleyne	1930–1931	12	9	4	0	35
210	G Algie	1930	4	1	0	0	3
211	Lionel Matchett	1930	1	0	0	0	0
212	Stan Simpson	1930–1934	20	3	2	0	13
213	S Hellyer	1930–1931	3	0	0	0	0
214	George Beaman	1931	4	4	0	0	12
215	James McMenamin	1931	13	3	0	0	9
216	Arthur Toby	1931–1933	41	3	0	0	9
217	S Lever	1931	1	0	0	0	0
218	Arthur Roberts	1931–1934	28	1	0	0	3
219	Harold Matthews	1931–1934	24	3	0	0	9
220	Horrie Balkwell	1931–1932	13	0	0	0	0
221	Dan Little	1931–1938	18	7	0	0	21
222	J O'Dowd	1931–1933	19	8	0	0	24
223	E Fulham	1931–1932	17	2	0	0	6
224	J Stapleton	1931	8	1	2	0	7
225	J Ricketts	1931	1	0	0	0	0
226	C De Valle	1932	4	0	0	0	0
227	T Cox	1932–1934	6	2	0	0	6
228	Ben Weber	1932	2	0	0	0	0
229	L Hanratty	1932	1	0	0	0	0
230	Billy Johnson	1932–1941	106	16	69	0	186
231	R Serio	1932	3	0	0	0	0
232	Michael Pace	1932–1935	41	5	0	0	15
233	Edmund Beaver	1932–1937	60	4	0	0	12
234	Harry Lapham	1932	1	0	0	0	0
235	Charlie Morris	1932	5	2	0	0	6
236	D Simpson	1933	6	1	0	0	3
237	Lex Small	1933	5	1	0	0	3
238	Les Trussler	1933	6	0	0	0	0
239	Bill Williams	1933–1935	31	6	0	0	18
240	F Parker	1933	5	1	0	0	3
241	Joe Sharp	1933	3	0	0	0	0
242	Bill Ballard	1933–1937	31	3	0	0	9
243	Sid Goodwin	1933–1942	118	86	2	0	262
244	Len Rue	1933–1934	11	3	0	0	9
245	Tom Grahame	1934–1936	29	9	0	0	27
246	J Tattersall	1934	11	0	0	0	0
247	G Thompson	1934–1936	6	2	0	0	6
248	J Dorman	1934	1	0	0	0	0
249	M Murden	1934	1	0	0	0	0
250	Pat Barry	1934–1935	12	2	0	0	6
251	Jack Pidcock	1934–1938	13	4	0	0	12
252	Francis Horth	1934	2	3	0	0	9
253	Joe Busch	1935–1936	19	9	0	0	27
254	Stephen Cooper	1935	8	1	0	0	3
255	Jack Redman	1935–1940	77	41	0	0	123
256	Gordon Sykes	1935–1938	13	2	0	0	6
257	Herbert Woodbry	1935	12	0	2	0	4
258	Norm Cox	1935–1936	18	1	0	0	3
259	Bill Alexander	1935–1937	25	2	0	0	6
260	Gus Reeves	1935–1936	13	8	0	0	24
261	H Wright	1935–1937	3	2	0	0	6
262	Ernie Latta	1935	2	0	0	0	0
263	Frank Griffiths	1935–1941	56	8	0	0	24
264	Harry Southcombe	1935	2	0	0	0	0
265	Jack Patterson	1935–1936	2	0	0	0	0
266	Maurice Fitzgerald	1936	3	1	0	0	3
267	Dave Manning	1936–1939	52	1	0	0	3
268	Frank Johnston	1936–1940	41	4	40	0	92
269	Roy Palmer	1936	12	1	0	0	3
270	Dave Colless	1936	6	3	0	0	9
271	Eddie Lockhart	1936–1937	7	0	0	0	0
272	Billy Bischoff Sr.	1937–1940	36	3	0	0	9
273	Stan Cowie	1937	4	0	0	0	0
274	Jack Gorman	1937–1938	13	4	0	0	12
275	Arthur Patton	1937–1948	117	95	9	0	303
276	Greg Toner	1937	3	1	1	0	5
277	Jack Caplice	1937	5	2	0	0	6
278	Joe Acheson	1937	3	0	0	0	0
279	Frank Gilmore	1937	1	0	0	0	0
280	Frank Hyde	1938–1941	38	16	2	0	52
281	Charles McKay	1938	7	0	0	0	0
282	Jim Quealey	1938–1945	58	13	46	0	131
283	Jack Winchester	1938–1944	58	15	0	0	45
284	L Knight	1938	1	0	0	0	0
285	Darcy Kearney	1938–1940	18	6	0	0	18
286	Dawson Buckley	1938–1947	113	20	3	0	66
287	Cliff McDonald	1938	4	5	1	0	17
288	George Watt	1938–1944	73	9	2	0	31
289	George Barr	1938	3	0	0	0	0
290	William Brown	1938–1939	2	0	0	0	0
291	M Chin	1938	1	0	0	0	0
292	Hec Day	1939–1943	38	4	21	0	54
293	Jack McVicar	1939	10	2	0	0	6
294	Athol Smith	1939–1945	92	29	0	0	87
295	Tom Bourke	1939–1948	147	47	76	0	293
296	Colin Fitzpatrick	1940	5	0	0	0	0
297	T Rowe	1940	1	0	0	0	0
298	John Rees	1940–1941	11	2	0	0	6
299	A Bowery	1940–1941	21	4	0	0	12
300	Jack Hampstead	1940–1950	112	30	1	0	92
301	Frank McNally	1940	1	0	0	0	0
302	H Wasson	1940	1	0	0	0	0
303	Henry Box	1941–1946	45	4	0	0	12
304	Johnny Brown	1941–1943	5	0	0	0	0
305	C Foster	1941	5	1	0	0	3
306	Frank Schultz	1941–1943	4	0	0	0	0
307	J Kinnard	1941–1942	10	0	0	0	0
308	Frank Tuffy	1941	7	0	0	0	0
309	George Wise	1941–1942	3	0	0	0	0
310	Doug Dobson	1941–1942	10	0	2	0	4
311	K Murphy	1941–1945	17	3	0	0	9
312	Fred de Belin	1942–1950	75	13	1	0	41
313	Ralph Ross	1942	5	0	0	0	0
314	Frank Driese	1942–1944	30	14	40	0	122
315	Oliver Duckworth	1942	1	0	0	0	0
316	A Johnson	1942	1	0	0	0	3
317	Ray Miranda	1942	1	0	0	0	0
318	Des Stapleton	1942–1947	17	3	4	0	17
319	Johnny Bliss	1942–1943	14	10	0	0	30
320	Joe Leo	1942	3	0	0	0	0
321	Jack Spencer	1942–1951	149	26	2	0	82
322	George Endycott	1942–1943	7	0	5	0	10
323	E.W. Bennett	1943	12	0	1	0	2
324	Merv Denton	1943	12	5	8	0	31
325	T Freney	1943–1945	17	1	0	0	3
326	Jack Danzey Sr.	1943–1944	11	1	0	0	3
327	Sid Ryan	1943–1951	104	5	0	0	15
328	Charlie Millar	1943–1946	16	0	13	1	28
329	Alf Hall	1943	4	0	2	0	4
330	Bob Patterson	1943–1948	19	15	0	0	45
331	Stan Ponchard	1943–1953	106	46	13	0	164
332	J Hayes	1944	1	0	0	0	0
333	Dave Parkinson	1944–1948	53	7	1	0	23
334	Cecil Jorgenson	1944–1953	95	22	334	0	734
335	Keith Parkinson	1944–1948	39	23	1	0	71
336	Colin Campbell	1944–1946	10	0	0	0	0
337	Pat Devery	1944–1947	38	25	59	0	193
338	Harry Leo	1945–1949	17	10	0	0	30
339	Ted McGovern	1945–1947	7	0	0	0	0
340	G Stokes	1945	1	0	0	0	0
341	Jack Metcalf	1945–1946	21	1	0	0	3
342	Hilton Kidd	1945–1948	27	2	0	0	6
343	Lionel Quigley	1945	4	0	0	0	0
344	Mitchell Wallace	1945–1948	13	5	0	0	15
345	D Thomas	1945	3	0	0	0	0
346	Bob Nielson	1945–1946	13	7	1	0	23
347	Ted Dawes	1945–1951	6	1	0	0	3
348	Harry Bath	1946–1947	30	11	0	0	33
349	Herb Gilbert Jr.	1946–1948	45	0	2	0	4
350	K Burton	1946	1	1	0	0	3
351	George Williams	1946–1951	48	20	1	0	6
352	W.D. Kelly	1946–1950	7	0	6	0	12
353	Jack McCullough	1946–1950	34	0	4	0	8
354	Bob Lulham	1947–1953	85	85	45	0	345
355	Jack Russell	1947	12	0	0	0	0
356	Bruce Smith	1947	5	0	0	0	0
357	V McLennan	1947	5	0	0	0	0
358	Ted Kealy	1947	3	4	0	0	12
359	Des Bryan	1947–1948	16	5	0	0	15
360	Jack Clare	1947	1	0	0	0	0
361	John Brannigan	1947	8	0	0	0	0
362	Arthur Kilmurray	1948	2	0	0	0	0
363	Jim Thomson	1948–1953	86	9	0	0	27
364	Ken Stephen	1948	3	0	0	0	0
365	Bob Crane	1948	16	0	0	0	0
366	Tom Lawler	1948–1954	57	8	0	0	24
367	Gene Barakat	1948	1	0	0	0	0
368	Leo Nosworthy	1948–1952	64	27	0	0	81
369	William Sneddon	1948–1949	21	2	0	0	6
370	Fred Brown	1949	8	0	3	0	6
371	John Campbell	1949–1954	37	4	0	0	12
372	Ken Fogarty	1949–1950	39	2	0	0	6
373	Bill Stewart	1949	1	0	0	0	0
374	R Robinson	1949	1	0	0	0	0
375	Jack Davis	1949–1954	3	64	0	0	137
376	Harold Gwyer	1949–1951	28	13	0	0	39
377	Kevin Harmey	1949–1950	29	14	1	0	44
378	Russ Smith	1949–1951	12	4	0	0	12
379	B Long	1949	1	0	0	0	0
380	Fred Fayers	1950	15	1	0	0	3
381	Bruce Hopkins	1950–1951	25	2	3	0	12
382	Bill Marsh	1950–1955, 1957–1960	142	30	2	0	94
383	Tom Tyrrell	1950–1954	52	6	0	0	18
384	Jack Scanlon	1950–1952	21	2	5	0	16
385	Jack Fifield	1950–1955	57	30	31	0	152
386	Ray Lees	1950–1954	32	4	1	0	14
387	Ron Battye	1951–1955	17	4	0	0	12
388	Jack McIntosh	1951	4	1	0	0	3
389	Ernie Church	1951–1952	13	4	0	0	12
390	Pat Hyde	1951–1953	20	5	0	0	15
391	Ron Graham	1951–1952	10	0	0	0	0
392	Jim Scott	1951	8	0	0	0	0
393	Ron Daley	1951–1955	47	7	0	0	21
394	Geoff Fallon	1951	2	0	0	0	0
395	J Doyle	1951	1	0	0	0	0
396	Terry Brogan	1951–1955	14	0	0	0	0
397	Roy Dykes	1951–1953	22	3	0	0	9
398	Jack Moon	1951–1956	56	9	0	0	27
399	Johnny O'Brien	1951–1958	31	0	0	0	0
400	Merv Williams	1951	5	1	0	0	3
401	Peter New	1951–1953	3	3	0	0	9
402	D Foss	1951	1	0	0	0	0
403	Bob Moon	1951–1952	3	0	0	0	0
404	R Sutton	1951–1952	3	0	0	0	0
405	Ray Laurie	1952	14	7	20	0	61
406	J McGarry	1952	4	0	0	0	0
407	Alf Roach	1952–1953	18	6	1	0	20
408	Neville Watt	1952–1959	104	16	39	0	126
409	Jack Williams	1952–1953	12	6	0	0	18
410	Ted Bonser	1953–1955	20	8	0	0	24
411	Bob Crichton	1953–1955	27	4	0	0	12
412	Colin de Lore	1953	16	3	0	0	9
413	George Fifield	1953–1957	42	32	29	0	154
414	Des Horne	1953–1958	29	25	0	0	75
415	Bob Lawrence	1953	9	1	0	0	3
416	John Mackenzie	1953–1954	23	4	0	0	12
417	Ron Proudfoot	1953–1958	31	1	0	0	3
418	Barry Willis	1953–1956	21	4	0	0	12
419	Jack Harrison	1953–1954	3	1	0	0	3
420	Clarrie Jeffreys	1953–1955	23	2	0	0	6
421	Cec Fitzsimmons	1953–1954	6	2	0	0	6
422	Kevin Humphreys	1953–1956	43	9	0	0	27
423	Jack Hardman	1953	1	0	0	0	0
424	N Jones	1953	3	0	0	0	0
425	Ray McFarlane	1953–1955	10	0	21	0	42
426	J Robinson	1953	2	0	0	0	0
427	Bill Garvin	1954	14	3	0	0	9
428	Les Gelfius	1954–1956	24	15	0	0	45
429	Kevin Honeybrook	1954	4	0	0	0	0
430	Johnny Johnston	1954	2	0	0	0	0
431	Geoff Lee	1954	2	0	0	0	0
432	Keith Barnes	1955–1968	194	11	742	1	1519
433	Geoff Hawkey	1955–1958	56	16	0	0	48
434	Danny Johnston	1955–1958	44	6	0	0	18
435	Terry McGovern	1955–1956	28	16	0	0	48
436	Don Sinclair	1955	17	0	0	0	0
437	Don Kerr	1955	1	0	0	0	0
438	Brian Staunton	1955–1958	65	23	0	0	69
439	Peter Meredith	1955	1	0	0	0	0
440	Graeme O'Donnell	1955–1957	3	1	0	0	3
441	Noel Ryan	1955	1	0	0	0	0
442	Don Solah	1955	2	1	0	0	3
443	Maurie Griffiths	1955–1956	3	2	3	0	12
444	Norm Swain	1955–1956	2	2	0	0	6
445	Keith Agget	1956	1	0	0	0	0
446	Gus Gray	1956	21	1	0	0	3
447	Bill Harris	1956	15	5	3	0	21
448	Arthur Lorimer	1956–1958	43	12	5	0	46
449	Alan Mason	1956–1962	73	5	0	0	15
450	Ron Moses	1956–1959	23	2	0	0	6
451	Kevin Mosman	1956–1957	33	14	0	0	42
452	Robert Heaney	1956–1957	23	2	0	0	6
453	Ron Potter	1956–1957	32	4	0	0	12
454	Jack Alleyne	1956–1958	10	4	0	0	12
455	Ron Clifford	1956–1960	24	4	27	0	66
456	Bill Frame	1956	5	0	0	0	0
457	Brian Jeffrey	1956	1	0	0	0	0
458	Don Amos	1957–1961	25	0	0	0	0
459	Billy Bischoff Jr.	1957–1965	151	34	0	0	102
460	Bob Boland	1957–1967	157	11	0	1	35
461	Joe Keighran	1957–1959	27	1	0	0	3
462	Jack Sinclair	1957–1960	46	6	0	0	18
463	Kevin Smyth	1957–1960	58	13	0	0	39
464	Ken Bray	1957	2	2	0	0	4
465	Ray Swanson	1957–1959	17	1	0	0	3
466	Ron Warnes	1957	7	1	26	0	55
467	Paul Broughton	1957	1	0	0	0	0
468	Geoff Wilkin	1957	5	0	0	0	0
469	Tommy McManus	1957–1959	3	0	0	0	0
470	Frank Drake	1958	11	5	0	0	15
471	Carl Rumph	1958	14	1	0	0	3
472	Bill Tonkin	1958–1959	26	2	5	0	19
473	Graham Jones	1958–1959	7	2	0	0	6
474	Eric Barnett	1958	3	1	2	0	7
475	Don Evenden	1959–1960	9	1	0	0	3
476	Laurie Fagan	1959–1966	98	19	22	0	101
477	Richard Richards	1958	1	0	0	0	0
478	Ron Mack	1959–1963	77	47	0	0	141
479	Bob Mara	1959–1967	141	70	2	0	214
480	Harry Raven	1959–1965	104	9	0	0	27
481	Bob Barrett	1959–1963	19	2	23	0	52
482	Doug Walton	1959–1962	25	2	0	0	6
483	Frank Connolly	1959	1	0	0	0	0
484	Ian McCarthy	1959	11	0	0	0	0
485	Pat Hoggard	1959	3	0	2	0	4
486	Jack Jones	1959	3	0	0	0	0
487	Brian Tranter	1959	5	0	0	0	0
488	John Mullins	1959–1962	14	4	13	0	38
489	Jimmy Garvin	1959–1960	6	1	0	0	3
490	Brian Brailey	1960–1962	14	1	0	0	3
491	Col Glover	1960	5	0	0	0	0
492	Greg Hay	1960–1964	13	1	0	0	3
493	Brian Henderson	1960–1961	28	1	0	0	3
494	George Piper	1960–1966	65	10	0	0	30
495	Dick Wilson	1960–1966	69	4	15	0	42
496	Jock Delaney	1960	2	1	0	0	3
497	Gordon Goldsmith	1960–1961	9	1	0	0	3
498	Andy Thomson	1960	4	0	0	0	0
499	Bob Hensby	1960–1962	14	1	0	0	3
500	Ian Foye	1961–1964	14	0	0	0	0
501	Bede Goff	1961	18	0	0	0	0
502	Gil MacDougall	1961	7	4	0	0	12
503	Rex Percy	1961–1963	26	3	8	0	25
504	Peter Provan	1961–1969	155	12	0	0	36
505	Dick Quinn	1961–1965	49	18	0	0	54
506	Ken Aitken	1961	1	0	0	0	0
507	Tom Cooper	1961	1	0	5	0	10
508	Terry O'Sullivan	1961	1	0	0	0	0
509	Jack Ragen	1961	1	0	2	0	4
510	Col Sandercock	1961–1965	15	2	0	0	6
511	Ted Allard	1962	2	1	0	0	3
512	Fred Booth	1962	7	1	0	0	3
513	Jack Danzey Jr.	1962–1965	48	4	17	0	46
514	Ian Fearnley	1962	11	0	0	0	0
515	Bob Ridley	1962–1965	38	7	0	0	21
516	Dave Cooper	1962–1966	19	0	0	0	0
517	Kevin Cox	1962	2	0	0	0	0
518	Harry Marcellos	1962	4	0	0	0	0
519	Ian Hay	1962	2	0	0	0	0
520	Graeme Ferguson	1962–1963	8	0	0	0	0
521	Ron Cooper	1962	4	0	1	0	2
522	Frank McGarry	1962–1963	10	2	0	0	6
523	Brian Dunlop	1963–1965	33	9	0	0	27
524	Garry Leo	1963–1974	173	29	0	1	89
525	Frank Clegg	1963	1	0	0	0	0
526	B Connors	1963	2	0	0	0	0
527	Gerry McGarry	1963	1	0	0	0	0
528	Hal Browne	1964–1970	73	25	3	0	81
529	Ron Clothier	1964–1968	26	5	0	0	15
530	Norm Henderson	1964–1967	21	1	0	0	3
531	Peter Jones	1964–1970	74	10	0	0	30
532	Peter Kelly	1964	9	0	23	0	46
533	Dennis Tutty	1964–1971, 1976	98	9	0	0	27
534	Doug Moore	1964	7	0	0	0	0
535	Ken Noble	1964	7	0	0	0	0
536	Robert Browne	1964	1	0	0	0	0
537	Martin Barnes	1965	4	1	0	0	3
538	Dave Bolton	1965–1970	78	5	7	21	71
539	Geoff Connell	1965–1971	30	1	0	0	3
540	John Gilligan	1965–1969	5	0	0	0	0
541	Bob Grant	1965	5	0	0	0	0
542	Brian Sullivan	1965–1967	7	2	0	0	6
543	Ray Westwood	1965	3	0	0	0	0
544	Arthur Beetson	1966–1970	74	6	1	0	20
545	Paul Cross	1966–1974	94	50	0	0	150
546	Kevin Yow Yeh	1966–1967	41	9	0	0	27
547	Kevin Gentles	1966	2	0	0	0	0
548	Jim Bonus	1966–1967	7	0	6	0	12
549	Laurie Moraschi	1966–1968	34	1	0	0	3
550	Sid Williams	1966–1970	59	13	26	0	91
551	John Spencer	1966–1975	161	58	1	5	185
552	Michael Ross	1966–1973	40	9	18	0	63
553	John McCarthy	1966–1969	3	0	0	1	2
554	Peter Davies	1967	2	0	0	0	0
555	Len Killeen	1967–1971	78	36	270	8	664
556	Norm Miller	1967–1969	34	0	0	0	0
557	George Ruebner	1967–1971	58	33	18	1	137
558	Allan Fitzgibbon	1968–1970	42	7	0	0	21
559	Greg Fryer	1968–1974	84	18	2	2	61
560	Keith Outten	1968–1971, 1975	83	14	2	3	52
561	Terry Parker	1968–1973	57	17	0	0	51
562	Ritchie Davies	1968	6	0	0	0	0
563	Malcolm Moss	1968	6	0	0	0	0
564	Jim Bragg	1968	4	2	0	0	6
565	John Crawford	1968–1969	23	1	0	0	3
566	Greg Christensen	1968	1	0	0	0	0
567	Peter Boulton	1969–1975	95	2	0	0	6
568	Peter Fardell	1969–1971	28	1	0	0	3
569	Kevin Bowrey	1969–1970	8	1	0	0	3
570	Barry McTaggart	1969–1972	59	5	0	0	15
571	Olaf Prattl	1969–1971	49	9	0	0	27
572	Robert Smithies	1969–1971	58	14	2	0	46
573	Joe Walsh	1969–1973	53	2	0	0	6
574	Phillip Carey	1969–1972	11	0	0	0	0
575	Ern Clingan	1969	1	0	0	0	0
576	Vic Querin	1969–1973	23	2	0	0	6
577	Darryl Palmer	1970–1972	13	2	0	0	6
578	Wayne Thomson	1970–1972	15	2	8	0	22
579	Terry Cross	1971–1974	31	4	0	0	12
580	Graham Mayhew	1971–1972	12	1	0	0	3
581	Ron Palmer	1971–1975	10	0	0	0	0
582	Geoff Starling	1971–1974	65	22	5	0	76
583	Steve Satterly	1971	9	1	28	0	59
584	Alan Tilbrook	1971–1975	30	1	0	0	3
585	George Fallon	1971	2	0	0	0	0
586	Ron Loomes	1971–1973	13	3	0	0	9
587	Ron Leis	1971–1974	7	1	6	0	15
588	Bruce Finn	1971–1973	3	0	0	0	0
589	Peter Handcock	1971	1	0	0	0	0
590	Ray Black	1972–1974	10	3	0	0	9
591	Bob Bolin	1972–1973	22	3	0	0	9
592	Glenn Capelin	1972–1974	45	19	0	0	57
593	Dick Jeffrey	1972–1973	23	0	0	0	0
594	Mal McMartin	1972–1973	15	2	0	0	6
595	Tim Murphy	1972–1974	58	12	0	0	36
596	Jeff Shield	1972–1976	71	11	0	0	33
597	Dennis Preston	1972	10	1	33	0	69
598	Russell Worth	1972	11	2	0	2	8
599	Mick Dryden	1972	1	0	0	0	0
600	Trevor Ryan	1972–1977, 1982	159	30	1	0	92
601	Bruce Warwick	1972	6	1	18	0	39
602	Bruce Doust	1973–1974	25	2	0	0	6
603	Peter Duffy	1973–1980	28	2	1	0	8
604	Dennis Carter	1973–1974	7	0	0	0	0
605	Phil Moase	1973–1976	21	3	0	0	9
606	Mark Tonks	1973–1974	23	4	57	0	126
607	Des Bonner	1973–1982	28	1	0	0	3
608	Alan Burke	1973–1974	7	0	0	0	0
609	Geoff Dell	1973	2	0	0	0	0
610	Peter Kachel	1973	2	0	0	0	0
611	Mark Levy	1974–1975	28	5	4	0	23
612	Dennis Manteit	1974–1976	35	7	0	0	21
613	Merv Muggleton	1974–1978	39	11	11	0	55
614	Noel Maybury	1974–1978	56	4	0	0	12
615	Paul Sommerville	1974–1975	18	3	0	0	9
616	Jim Fiddler	1974	15	1	40	0	83
617	Trevor Forwood	1974–1977	25	7	17	0	55
618	Frank Ragen	1974–1976	19	9	0	0	27
619	Phil Heggen	1974	1	0	0	0	0
620	Alan Lennon	1974	1	0	0	0	0
621	Steve Smith	1974–1976	12	1	0	0	3
622	Mike Fish	1974–1980	90	30	4	0	98
623	Keith Cook	1975–1978	56	2	38	0	82
624	Steve Lavers	1975–1982	93	3	0	0	9
625	Allan McMahon	1975–1981	110	28	10	0	104
626	Neil Pringle	1975–1982	122	28	0	0	84
627	Graham Roberts	1975–1976	24	5	43	0	101
628	Albert Tabone	1975	1	0	0	0	0
629	Warren Evans	1975	7	0	0	0	0
630	Brian Lockwood	1975–1977	46	2	0	0	6
631	Jeff Brian	1975	9	1	18	0	39
632	John Cunningham	1975	5	1	5	1	14
633	Wayne Grogan	1975	1	0	0	0	0
634	Alan Rhoades	1975	1	0	0	0	0
635	Gary Thomson	1975	1	0	0	0	0
636	Greg Bandiera	1976–1977	26	2	0	0	6
637	Dave Edwards	1976–1978	34	2	0	0	6
638	Stephen Knight	1976–1977	37	14	0	0	32
639	Arthur Mountier	1976–1977	27	2	0	0	6
640	Greg Cox	1976–1977	44	8	130	0	284
641	Gerard Crowe	1976, 1980–1981	14	0	0	0	0
642	Dennis Bendall	1976–1979	68	24	0	0	72
643	Mark Beaven	1976–1978	5	0	0	0	0
644	Col Gorton	1976	4	1	0	0	3
645	Brendan Mockford	1976	1	0	0	0	0
646	Wayne Wigham	1976–1983	135	56	0	0	169
647	Steve Frewin	1976–1979	16	0	0	0	0
648	Bill Cloughessy	1976	1	0	0	0	0
649	Warren Boland	1976–1978	22	2	0	0	6
650	Gary Spears	1977–1982	71	2	0	0	6
651	David Topliss	1977	2	1	0	0	3
652	Neil McDowell	1977	7	1	0	0	3
653	Col Ensor	1977	1	0	0	0	0
654	Peter Ninness	1977–1979	24	3	27	0	63
655	Larry Corowa	1978–1983	98	64	0	0	199
656	David Grant	1978–1981	50	8	0	0	24
657	Frank Marino	1978–1980	13	0	0	0	0
658	Wayne Miranda	1978–1983	91	12	252	0	541
659	Geoff Naylor	1978–1979	38	4	0	0	12
660	Phil Schaefer	1978–1982	37	12	0	0	36
661	Lloyd Martin	1978–1981	30	8	0	0	24
662	Bill Hilliard	1978–1982	14	0	0	0	0
663	Percy Knight	1978–1982	64	11	0	0	33
664	Guy Tully	1978	3	0	0	0	0
665	Bob Paton	1978	2	0	0	0	0
666	Mick Liubinskas	1979	2	0	0	0	0
667	Rod Morris	1979–1981	56	4	0	0	12
668	Greg Oliphant	1979–1980	27	2	0	0	6
669	Gary Webster	1979–1982	37	3	0	0	9
670	Gary Day	1979	1	0	0	0	0
671	Neil Whittaker	1979–1985	118	11	0	1	34
672	Steve Kerr	1979–1982	19	4	23	0	58
673	Lindsay Delpech	1979–1980	2	0	0	0	0
674	Gary Thompson	1979	3	0	0	0	0
675	John Muggleton	1979	6	1	0	0	3
676	Tom Gillogly	1979	2	0	1	0	2
677	Mark Lawson	1979–1984	56	11	0	0	41
678	Olsen Filipaina	1980–1984	81	19	83	0	225
679	Kerry Hemsley	1980–1988	139	3	0	0	11
680	Wayne Pearce	1980–1990	192	33	0	0	123
681	Ron Pilon	1980–1981	28	3	0	0	9
682	Lance Thompson	1980	3	0	0	0	0
683	David Adams	1980	2	1	0	0	3
684	John Bilbija	1980–1981	4	1	0	0	3
685	John Davidson	1980–1988	168	60	22	0	272
686	Paul Morris	1980	2	0	0	0	0
687	Wayne Innes	1980–1982	9	3	0	0	9
688	Mal Creevey	1981	6	1	0	0	3
689	Craig Clarke	1981	1	0	0	0	0
690	Peter Grounds	1981–1982, 1986	16	1	0	0	3
691	John Sparks	1981	6	1	0	0	6
692	Ian Thomson	1981	9	0	0	0	0
693	Bill Kain	1981–1986	43	5	0	0	19
694	John Owens	1981–1988	56	3	0	0	12
695	Gary Bridge	1982–1986	104	32	1	0	122
696	Steve Martin	1982–1984	53	10	0	1	38
697	Terry Regan	1982	19	4	0	0	12
698	Gary Mara	1982	1	0	0	0	0
699	Garry Jack	1982–1992, 1995	244	60	1	1	239
700	Kevin Hardwick	1982–1990	145	9	1	0	36
701	Greg Lane	1982–1984	37	8	0	0	32
702	Scott Rigney	1982	1	1	0	0	3
703	Steve Roach	1982–1992	185	12	0	0	48
704	Michael Schofield	1982–1984	32	1	0	0	4
705	Benny Elias	1982–1994	232	36	4	33	181
706	Simon Booth	1983–1984	25	5	0	0	20
707	David Brooks	1983–1992	173	14	108	1	273
708	Tony Keevill	1983	8	1	0	0	4
709	James Bell	1983–1985	5	0	0	0	0
710	Bruce Gall	1983–1984	11	1	0	0	4
711	Michael Marketo	1983–1987	53	3	0	0	12
712	Ron Ryan	1983–1986	32	9	0	0	36
713	Stephen Humphreys	1983–1987	41	12	0	0	48
714	Jamie Davidson	1983–1987	26	3	0	0	12
715	David French	1984	9	0	0	0	0
716	Paul Beaven	1984–1988	40	8	0	0	32
717	Steve Massey	1984	2	0	0	0	0
718	Paul Clarke	1984–1989	64	1	0	0	4
719	Tony Elias	1984	1	0	0	0	0
720	Gavin Hanrahan	1984–1987	35	7	0	0	28
721	Ross Conlon	1985–1988	98	15	348	0	756
722	Scott Gale	1985–1988	99	35	0	3	143
723	Russel Gartner	1985–1989	99	26	0	0	116
724	Bruce Parnell	1985	1	0	0	0	0
725	Rod Pethybridge	1985	6	2	0	0	8
726	Garry Schofield	1985–1987	47	28	9	4	134
727	Brett McClure	1985	1	0	0	0	0
728	Paul Sironen	1985–1998	246	22	0	0	88
729	Michael Campbell	1985–1987	9	1	1	0	6
730	Paul McCabe	1986	8	0	0	0	0
731	Bruce McGuire	1986–1990	83	6	0	0	24
732	Glenn Stanton	1986–1988	4	0	0	0	0
733	Tony Myler	1986	12	1	0	0	4
734	Michael Perry	1986	7	0	0	0	0
735	Bruce Sinclair	1986–1988	13	0	0	0	0
736	Peter Camroux	1987	10	0	0	0	0
737	Mick Neil	1987–1991, 1994	97	17	0	0	68
738	Matt Carter	1987	6	2	0	0	8
739	Phil Sigsworth	1987	9	2	0	0	8
740	Paul Daley	1987	1	0	0	0	0
741	Lee Crooks	1987	11	0	7	0	14
742	Clint Robinson	1987–1992	52	19	0	0	76
743	Peter Davies	1987	6	3	0	0	12
744	Patrick Crown	1987	1	0	0	0	0
745	Graham Pearce	1987	1	0	0	0	0
746	Paul McInerney	1987	1	0	0	0	0
747	Gary Freeman	1988–1991	51	19	0	0	76
748	Matt Parish	1988–1993	55	6	0	0	24
749	Michael Pobjie	1988–1990	37	5	0	0	20
750	David Rowles	1988	5	0	0	0	0
751	Steve Edmed	1988–1995	136	5	0	0	20
752	Damien McGarry	1988–1990	15	9	0	0	36
753	Michael Moss	1988–1990	15	3	0	0	12
754	Steve Benkic	1988–1990	18	1	0	0	4
755	Daryl Powell	1988	4	2	0	0	8
756	Wayne Sing	1988–1991	14	0	0	0	0
757	Ellery Hanley	1988, 1996–1997	34	8	0	1	33
758	Tony Chalmers	1989–1990	16	3	0	0	12
759	James Grant	1989–1992	65	30	3	0	126
760	Steve O'Brien	1989–1992	58	16	6	0	64
761	Tim Brasher	1989–1997	185	82	105	0	538
762	Craig Sloane	1989–1991	10	1	0	0	4
763	Gary McFarlane	1989–1993	45	5	0	0	20
764	Shaun Edwards	1989	12	1	0	0	4
765	Grant Muscat	1989	1	0	0	0	0
766	Bill Rule	1989	1	0	0	0	0
767	Andy Currier	1989–1990	22	10	68	0	176
768	Doug Delaney	1989	2	0	0	0	0
769	John Elias	1989–1992, 1994	67	7	0	0	28
770	Ian McCann	1989–1992	32	5	17	0	54
771	Peter Phillips	1990–1992	17	0	0	0	0
772	Paul Upfield	1990–1991	7	1	0	0	4
773	Michael Brown	1990–1996	56	9	0	0	36
774	Mark Afflick	1990–1992	13	0	0	0	0
775	Will Robinson	1990–1994	62	27	2	0	112
776	David Anderson	1991	12	1	0	0	4
777	David Bayssari	1991–1997	93	14	35	1	126
778	Cameron Douglas	1991	5	0	0	0	0
779	Craig Izzard	1991	8	0	0	0	0
780	Brian Smith	1991–1993	37	6	84	6	198
781	Perry Smith	1991	2	0	0	0	0
782	Martin Masella	1991–1994	71	3	0	0	12
783	Shane O'Grady	1991–1992	16	1	0	0	4
784	Jacin Sinclair	1991–1993, 1998–1999	45	5	0	1	21
785	George Doumitt	1991–1993	6	0	0	0	0
786	John Mulvihill	1991–1992	4	0	0	0	0
787	Matt Munro	1992–1995	60	5	0	0	20
788	Paul Davis	1992–1993	40	10	11	0	62
789	Derek McVey	1992–1995	51	11	0	0	44
790	Matt Burke	1992	2	1	0	0	4
791	Bernard Carroll	1992–1994	22	0	0	0	0
792	Darren Thorson	1992	1	0	0	0	0
793	Levei Tuhetoka	1992–1993	7	1	0	0	4
794	Jamie Kelso	1992–1993	4	0	0	0	0
795	Jamie Corcoran	1993	18	3	15	0	42
796	Morvin Edwards	1993–1994	26	6	2	0	28
797	Mark Geyer	1993	13	2	0	0	8
798	Graham Lyons	1993–1994	33	14	0	0	56
799	Gavin Catanach	1993	12	0	0	0	0
800	Danny Stapleton	1993–1994	14	4	0	0	4
801	Stephen Scahill	1993–1995	12	1	0	0	4
802	David Chapman	1993	1	0	0	0	0
803	James Carrick	1993	4	2	0	0	8
804	Nathan Wood	1993–1994	19	4	0	0	16
805	Steve Fanale	1993	3	0	0	0	0
806	Dean Wheeler	1993	2	0	0	0	0
807	Shayne Boyd	1993	1	0	0	0	0
808	Wes Patten	1993–1996	27	7	0	0	28
809	Greg Bourke	1994–1996	22	7	29	0	86
810	Richie Connell	1994	5	0	0	0	0
811	David Ronson	1994	3	0	0	0	0
812	Hudson Smith	1994–1998	78	5	1	0	22
813	Paul Buchanan	1994	2	0	0	0	0
814	Michael Gillett	1994–1999	95	18	0	1	73
815	Shane Russell	1994–1995	18	9	0	0	36
816	Geoff Hassan	1994	2	0	0	0	0
817	Shane Powell	1994	14	0	0	0	0
818	Jason Small	1994–1995	9	0	0	0	0
819	Jason Darcy	1994	13	0	0	0	0
820	Chris Morcombe	1994, 1999	22	9	0	0	36
821	Damien Ford	1994–1995	10	1	0	0	4
822	Marty Moore	1994	11	4	0	0	16
823	John Bentley	1994	10	1	0	0	4
824	Des Clark	1994	13	0	0	0	0
825	Andrew McIlwaine	1994	1	0	0	0	0
826	Grant Stuart	1994	7	2	1	0	10
827	Chris Tauro	1994	3	0	0	0	0
828	Mark O'Neill	1994–1999	102	10	0	0	40
829	Greg Barwick	1995	17	0	37	1	75
830	Gary Edwards	1995–1997	30	10	0	0	40
831	Tony Price	1995	10	0	0	0	0
832	Darren Senter	1995–1999	100	15	0	0	60
833	Dan Stains	1995–1996	35	0	0	0	0
834	Shane Walker	1995–1999	100	2	1	0	10
835	Sean McVean	1995–1996	14	0	0	0	0
836	Asa Milford	1995–1997	22	3	0	0	12
837	Jeremy Moors	1995	9	1	4	0	12
838	Evan Cochrane	1995	7	4	0	0	16
839	Jason Carpenter	1995	1	0	0	0	0
840	Corey Pearson	1995–1996	25	1	0	0	4
841	Michael Withers	1995–1998	40	12	45	0	138
842	Peter Fitzgerald	1995	7	3	0	0	12
843	Dave Watson	1995	2	0	0	0	0
844	James Langaloa	1995	27	11	0	0	44
845	Ian Herron	1996	12	3	35	0	82
846	William Kennedy	1996–1998	61	16	0	0	104
847	Glenn Morrison	1996–1997	41	7	0	0	28
848	Tim Patterson	1996	14	2	0	0	8
849	Mark Stimson	1996–1999	77	5	0	0	20
850	Jason Thompson	1996	3	0	0	0	0
851	Bernard Wilson	1996–1997	6	0	0	0	0
852	Craig Patch	1996	5	1	0	0	4
853	Adam Starr	1996–1999	41	1	0	0	4
854	Mike Dorreen	1996	10	3	0	0	12
855	Scott McPherson	1996	1	0	0	0	0
856	Darren Anderson	1996	2	0	0	0	0
857	Anthony Brann	1996	4	0	0	0	0
858	Laloa Milford	1996–1999	38	18	0	0	72
859	Greg Donaghey	1997–1998	32	4	0	0	16
860	Craig Freer	1997	2	0	2	0	4
861	Adam Nable	1997–1999	57	11	0	0	44
862	Stephen Bosse	1997	1	0	0	0	0
863	Josh Bostock	1997	2	1	0	0	4
864	Jason Webber	1997–1999	52	14	0	0	56
865	Steven Jolly	1997	11	1	0	0	4
866	Chris McPherson	1997–1998	10	2	0	0	8
867	Jody Rudd	1997–1998	7	0	0	0	0
868	Chris St. Clair	1997–1998	7	0	0	0	0
869	Marshall Scott	1997–1998	10	0	0	0	0
870	Ben Duckworth	1998–1999	29	5	0	1	21
871	Shayne Dunley	1998–1999	28	3	0	0	12
872	Jim Gannon	1998–1999	22	0	0	0	0
873	Shannon Nevin	1998–1999	31	0	69	1	139
874	Brendan Magnus	1998–1999	10	3	0	0	12
875	Talite Liavaʻa	1998	6	0	0	0	0
876	Andrew Meads	1998–1999	12	1	0	0	4
877	Leigh Hennessy	1998	2	0	2	0	4
878	David McLean	1998	1	0	0	0	0
879	Joel Caine	1999	19	4	38	0	92
880	John Carlaw	1999	23	7	0	0	28
881	Craig Hancock	1999	20	6	0	0	24
882	Solomon Haumono	1999	8	1	0	0	4
883	Jason Lowrie	1999	24	0	0	0	0
884	Justin Yeo	1999	10	0	0	0	0
885	Brad Smith	1999	11	1	0	0	4
886	Tyran Smith	1999	16	0	0	0	0
887	Garth Wood	1999	3	0	0	0	0
888	Troy Wozniak	1999	2	0	0	0	0
889	Craig Field	1999	17	2	1	2	12
890	Richard Villasanti	1999	6	1	0	0	4
891	James Webster	1999	9	3	0	0	12
892	Steve Price	1999	3	1	0	0	4
893	Hayes Lauder	1999	7	0	0	0	0
894	Wade Rothery	1999	7	2	0	0	8
895	Ben Galea	1999	2	0	0	0	0
896	Michael Ostini	1999	4	0	0	0	0
897	Kylie Leuluai	1999	7	0	0	0	0
898	Nick Shaw	1999	1	0	0	0	0
899	Mark Luland	1999	4	1	0	0	4
900	Luke O'Donnell	1999	3	0	0	0	0
901	Nathan Webber	1999	1	0	0	0	0

== Balmain Tigers District Junior Rugby League ==
The Balmain Tigers District Junior Rugby League is one of the oldest Junior Rugby League Competitions in Australia. It administers an affiliation of junior rugby league clubs in the inner west and inner north-west of Sydney.

The league caters for age groups from under 6's to A Grade (opens). The Senior competition (Under 13's – A Grade) is a combined inner Sydney competition with the St. George, South Sydney & Eastern Suburbs District Junior Rugby League. Under 6's to Under 8's is a non-competitive competition. Under 9's to Under 12's play in a modified competition.

As of 2009, there were ten clubs in the Balmain Tigers Junior Rugby League, with over 120 teams. These clubs are;

- Balmain PCYC (formerly known as Balmain Police Boys)
- Carlingford Cougars (formerly known as St Gerards Carlingford)
- Concord-Burwood United Wolves (merger of Burwood Utd & Concord Utd in the 1990s, former Western Suburbs junior clubs)
- Dundas Shamrocks Junior Rugby League Football Club (formerly known as St Patricks Dundas)
- Five Dock RSL Dockers (former Western Suburbs junior club)
- Holy Cross Rhinos (Ryde)
- Leichhardt Juniors
- Leichhardt Wanderers (known as Leichhardt Gladstone until the 1930s) who are the oldest continuously running junior league team in Australia – has fielded at least one team every year since 1913.
- North Ryde Hawks
- Strathfield Raiders
- West Ryde-Denistone Stones
- Enfield Federals (joined 2010, former Western Suburbs junior club)

Some extinct clubs that once played in the Balmain District junior competition include;

- Drummoyne Sports (until the 1990s)
- Balmain Waratahs (until the 1990s)
- Ermington-Rydalmere (until the 1990s)
- Glebe Police Boys (until the 1990s)
- Balmain United (until the 1990s)
- Cricketers Arms (until the 1990s – Darling St, Balmain – now known as Monkey Bar)
- Sackville Sharks
- Ryde District Devils (until the 1980s)
- Birchgrove Scorpions (until the 1980s)
- Gladesville Sports (until the 1980s)
- West Ryde-Dundas
- Rozelle Codocks (until the 1970s)
- Pyrmont Colts (until the 1970s)
- Glebe Shamrocks (aka St James Sports Club – until the 1970s)
- Ryde CYO (until the 1970s)
- Carlingford CYO (until the 1970s)
- Balmain Airlines (until the 1970s)
- Glebe Youth
- Bing & Swing (Glebe, former Glebe district junior team – folded in 1930)
- Balmain Iona (aka Rozelle Iona)
- Drummoyne Rovers (1920s)
- Rozelle Fernleigh (1920s)
- Marist College Eastwood
- OLHC Epping
- St Augustines Balmain

Some notable Balmain juniors include;

- Wayne Pearce (Balmain Police Boys)
- Paul Sironen (North Ryde)
- Benny Elias (Holy Cross)
- Dene Halatau (North Ryde, formerly of Wentworthville)
- Robbie Farah (Leichhardt Wanderers, formerly of Enfield Federals)
- Bronson Harrison (Leichhardt Wanderers & Balmain PCYC)
- Josh Lewis (Leichhardt Wanderers)
- Kurtley Beale (North Ryde)
- Mitchell Pearce (North Ryde)
- Alan Thompson (North Ryde)
- Wayne Wigham (North Ryde)
- Mark O'Neill (North Ryde & Dundas Shamrocks)
- Kevin Hardwick (Ryde District Devils & Ermington-Rydalmere)
- John Davidson (Birchgrove Scorpions & Ermington-Rydalmere)
- Ron Ryan (North Ryde)

== See also ==
- Wests Tigers
