= Jeremy Moors =

Australian rugby league footballer

Personal information
- Full name: Jeremy Moors
- Born: 7 October 1971 (age 53)

Playing information
- Position: Wing
Club
Years	Team	Pld	T	G	FG	P
1992	Canterbury Bulldogs	1	0	0	0	0
1995	Balmain Tigers	9	1	4	0	12
	Total	10	1	4	0	12
- Source: As of 6 January 2023

Jeremy Moors is an Australian former professional rugby league footballer who played in the 1990s. He played for Canterbury-Bankstown and Balmain in NSWRL/ARL competition.

== Playing career ==
Moors made his first grade debut for Canterbury-Bankstown in round 22 of the 1992 NSWRL season against arch-rivals Parramatta at Parramatta Stadium. Moors played on the wing in Canterbury's 16–16 draw. In 1995, Moors joined Balmain at a time when the club were known as the "Sydney Tigers". Moors made nine appearances for the club throughout the 1995 ARL season before being released.
