= Ron Ryan (rugby league) =

Australian rugby league player (born 1964)

Personal information
- Born: 23 November 1964 (age 60)

Playing information
- Position: Five-eighth / Halfback
Club
Years	Team	Pld	T	G	FG	P
1983–86	Balmain Tigers	32	9	0	0	36
1984–85	Halifax Panthers	20	10	0	0	40
1987	Eastern Suburbs	2	0	0	0	0
	Total	54	19	0	0	76

Ron Ryan (born 23 November 1964) is an Australian former rugby league player.

Active during the 1980s, Ryan was used primarily in the halves, but could also play fullback and wing. He captained Balmain to the 1982 Jersey Flegg Cup title and made his first-grade debut the following year. In 1984–85, Ryan had a stint at the Halifax Panthers under future Australia coach Chris Anderson, forming a halves partnership with Michael Hagan. He was signed by Eastern Suburbs at the end of the 1986 NSWRL season.
