= Doug Delaney =

Australian rugby league footballer

Personal information
- Full name: Doug Delaney

Playing information
- Position: Halfback
Club
Years	Team	Pld	T	G	FG	P
1987–88	Penrith Panthers	17	1	0	0	4
1989	Balmain Tigers	2	0	0	0	0
1990–92	Illawarra Steelers	29	9	0	0	36
1993	Penrith Panthers	2	0	0	0	0
	Total	50	10	0	0	40
- Source: As of 31 January 2023

Doug Delaney is an Australian former professional rugby league footballer who played in the 1980s and 1990s. He played for Penrith, Illawarra and Balmain in the NSWRL competitions.

== Playing career ==
Delaney was a Mount Druitt junior and made his first grade debut for Penrith in round 2 of the 1987 NSWRL season against Manly at Brookvale Oval. Delaney made another nine appearances in the second half of the season (five as starting halfback) and finished the season as a member of the premiership winning reserve grade team. In 1988, he would make eight appearances, including the fifth spot play-off against Balmain.

In 1989, he moved to Balmain but only made two appearances. Delaney then spent three seasons at Illawarra before returning to Penrith in 1993. He made two first grade appearances in 1993, including the final premiership round against Cronulla-Sutherland.
