= Alf Latta =

Australian rugby league footballer

Personal information
- Full name: Alfred Latta
- Born: 16 October 1882 Balmain, New South Wales, Australia
- Died: 5 March 1947 (aged 64) Camperdown, New South Wales

Playing information
- Position: Wing, Centre
Club
Years	Team	Pld	T	G	FG	P
1908–12	Balmain	41	8	10	1	46
Representative
Years	Team	Pld	T	G	FG	P
1908	Metropolis	2	3	0	0	9
1909	New South Wales	1	0	0	0	0
- Source: As of 15 February 2019
- Relatives: Reg Latta (brother)

Alf Latta (1882–1947) was an Australian rugby league footballer who played in the 1900s and 1910s. He played for Balmain and was a foundation player of the club.

== Playing career ==
Latta made his first grade debut for Balmain against Western Suburbs on 20 April 1908 at Birchgrove Oval, which was the club's first ever game and also the opening week of the inaugural NSWRL competition. Balmain went on to win the match 24–0 in front of 3000 spectators. Latta scored Balmain's first ever try as a club and also kicked the club's first goals during the game.

Latta played with Balmain up until the end of the 1912 before retiring with his last game being an 8–5 loss against Annandale.

Latta played representative football for New South Wales in 1909 and played 2 games for Metropolis scoring 3 tries

Latta's son Ernie also went to play for Balmain in 1935.
