= John Sparks (rugby league) =

Australian rugby league footballer

Personal information
- Full name: John Sparks
- Born: 4 May 1962 (age 64) Sydney, New South Wales, Australia

Playing information
- Position: Five-eighth, Fullback, Centre
Club
Years	Team	Pld	T	G	FG	P
1981	Balmain Tigers	6	1	0	0	3
1982–84	Illawarra Steelers	42	16	0	0	51
	Total	48	17	0	0	54
- Source: As of 26 February 2019

John Sparks is an Australian former professional rugby league footballer who played in the 1980s. Sparks was a foundation player for Illawarra playing in the club's first game.

== Playing career ==
Sparks made his first grade debut for Balmain in Round 4 1981 against Canterbury at Leichhardt Oval with the match finishing in a 52–13 loss.

Balmain went on to finish with the wooden spoon after coming last in 1981 and was one of only four times that the foundation club would ever come last in its entire history.

In 1982, Sparks joined newly admitted Illawarra and played in the club's first ever game which was against Penrith at WIN Stadium and ended in a 17–7 loss. Sparks finished as the club's joint top try scorer in its inaugural year with 13 tries.

Sparks played 2 more seasons with Illawarra before retiring at the end of 1984.
