= Bill Tonkin =

Australian rugby league footballer

Personal information
- Full name: Bill Tonkin

Playing information
- Position: Lock, Second-row
Club
| Years | Team | Pld | T | G | FG | P |
|---|---|---|---|---|---|---|
| 1958–59 | Balmain | 20 | 3 | 5 | 0 | 19 |
| 1960 | Western Suburbs | 10 | 3 | 0 | 0 | 9 |
| 1962 | South Sydney | 13 | 1 | 0 | 0 | 3 |
| 1967 | Penrith | 22 | 2 | 1 | 0 | 8 |
| | Total | 65 | 9 | 6 | 0 | 39 |

Bill Tonkin is an Australian former professional rugby league footballer who played as a lock in the 1950s and 1960s. He played for Penrith, Balmain, Western Suburbs and South Sydney. Tonkin was an inaugural player for Penrith and played in the club's first ever game.

== Playing career ==
Tonkin made his first grade debut for Balmain in 1958 and played in the preliminary final defeat against St George. In 1960, Tonkin joined Western Suburbs and played in both finals games for the club which ended in losses against St George and Eastern Suburbs respectively.

In 1962, Tonkin joined South Sydney and played 13 games for the club as they finished last on the table. After spending the next 4 years in reserve grade, Tonkin joined newly admitted side Penrith in 1967 and became a foundation player at the club featuring in its first ever game against Canterbury. That year, Penrith finished second last on the table avoiding the wooden spoon. Tonkin played on in 1968 and retired at the end of the season.
