= Peter Grounds =

Australian rugby league footballer (born 1960)

Personal information
- Full name: Peter Grounds
- Born: 27 January 1960 (age 66)

Playing information
- Position: Wing, Centre
Club
Years	Team	Pld	T	G	FG	P
1981–82	Balmain	14	1	0	0	3
1983–84	Eastern Suburbs	20	4	0	0	16
1986	Balmain	2	0	0	0	0
	Total	36	5	0	0	19
- Source: As of 20 January 2023

Peter Grounds is an Australian former professional rugby league footballer who played in the 1980s. He played for Eastern Suburbs and Balmain in the NSWRL competition.

== Playing career ==
Grounds made his first grade debut for Balmain in round 4 of the 1981 NSWRFL season against Canterbury at Leichhardt Oval. Grounds played on the wing in the club's 52-13 loss. Grounds played a total of four matches in his first season with the club as Balmain came last on the table and claimed only the third Wooden Spoon in their long history. After a further year with Balmain, Grounds signed for Eastern Suburbs where he spent the next two seasons. In 1986, Grounds returned to Balmain and played a further two matches for the club.
