= Marshall Scott (rugby league) =

Australian rugby league footballer

Personal information
- Full name: Marshall Scott
- Born: 8 June 1975 (age 49)

Playing information
- Position: Wing
Club
Years	Team	Pld	T	G	FG	P
1997–98	Balmain Tigers	10	0	0	0	0
1999	Western Suburbs	1	0	0	0	0
	Total	11	0	0	0	0
- Source: As of 16 December 2022

Marshall Scott is an Australian former professional rugby league footballer who played in the 1990s. He played for Balmain and Western Suburbs in the NRL competition.

== Playing career ==
Scott made his first grade debut for Balmain in round 13 of the 1997 ARL season against Illawarra at WIN Stadium. Scott made one further appearance that year against Western Suburbs. In the 1998 NRL season, Scott made eight appearances for the Balmain club. In 1999, Scott joined Western Suburbs and made one appearance for the club which was in round 3 against Penrith at Penrith Stadium with the match finishing in a 60–6 loss. This would be Scott's last game in the top grade and he was not offered a contract to join the newly merged team Wests Tigers ahead of the 2000 NRL season.
