= Harry Raven =

Australian rugby league footballer

Personal information
- Full name: Harry Raven
- Born: 1937
- Died: 26 January 2023 (aged 85–86)

Playing information
- Position: Second-row, Prop, Lock
Club
| Years | Team | Pld | T | G | FG | P |
|---|---|---|---|---|---|---|
| 1959–65 | Balmain | 104 | 9 | 0 | 0 | 27 |
| 1966 | North Sydney | 6 | 1 | 0 | 0 | 3 |
| | Total | 110 | 10 | 0 | 0 | 30 |
- Source: As of 15 May 2019

Harry Raven is an Australian former rugby league footballer who played in the 1950s and 1960s. He played for Balmain and North Sydney in the New South Wales Rugby League (NSWRL) competition.

== Playing career ==
Raven made his first grade debut for Balmain in 1959. In 1961, Balmain finished third on the table and reached the preliminary final against Western Suburbs. Raven played at prop as Balmain were narrowly defeated by Wests 7-5 at the Sydney Cricket Ground. In 1963, Balmain again finished third on the table and reached the semi-final against Parramatta. Raven played at prop as Balmain were defeated in a close game 9-7. In 1964, Balmain reached the 1964 NSWRL grand final against the all conquering St George. Raven played in both finals games to reach the decider against Norths and Parramatta but cruelly missed out on playing in the grand final due to a broken arm received against Parramatta which St George won 11-6.

Raven played one further season with Balmain in 1965 before departing the club after 104 appearances. In 1966, Raven joined North Sydney and played one season with them as they finished second last on the table before retiring.
