= Gary Spears =

Australian rugby league footballer

Personal information
- Full name: Gary Spears
- Born: 25 July 1957 (age 69) Sydney, New South Wales, Australia

Playing information
- Position: Lock, Second-row
Club
Years	Team	Pld	T	G	FG	P
1977–82	Balmain	71	2	0	0	6
1983–86	Canberra Raiders	44	2	0	0	8
	Total	115	4	0	0	14
- Source: As of 17 May 2019

Gary Spears is an Australian former rugby league footballer who played in the 1970s and 1980s. He played for Balmain and the Canberra Raiders in the New South Wales Rugby League (NSWRL) competition.

== Playing career ==
Spears made his first-grade debut for Balmain in Round 2 1977 against South Sydney at Redfern Oval. In the same year, Balmain reached the finals after finishing 4th. Spears played in the club's minor semifinal victory over Manly-Warringah but did not play in semifinal defeat against Eastern Suburbs.

Spears played with Balmain up until the end of 1982 with not much success as the club finished last with the wooden spoon in 1981 although they did reach the final of the Tooth Cup against Parramatta in 1980.

In 1983, Spears joined newly admitted Canberra who joined the premiership a year prior. Spears became a regular in the Canberra side over the next 4 seasons, but the club missed out on playing in the finals in each year he was there. Spears retired at the end of the 1986 season. The following year, Canberra would reach their first grand finale against Manly.
