= Alf Fraser =

Australian rugby league footballer and coach

Personal information
- Full name: Sydney Andrew Fraser
- Born: 13 January 1890; Townsville, Queensland, Australia
- Died: 27 December 1959 (aged 69)

Playing information
- Position: Second-row, Prop
Club
Years	Team	Pld	T	G	FG	P
1916–25	Balmain	129	15	0	0	45
Representative
Years	Team	Pld	T	G	FG	P
1918–23	New South Wales	8	0	0	0	0
1922	Metropolis	2	0	0	0	0

Coaching information
Club
Years	Team	Gms	W	D	L	W%
1925–29	Balmain	74	28	4	42	38
- Source: As of 15 February 2019

Alf Fraser nicknamed "Sonny" was an Australian professional rugby league footballer who played in the 1910s and 1920s. He played for Balmain as a second rower but also played as a prop.

== Playing career ==
Fraser made his debut in 1916 for Balmain against local rivals Glebe. That same year Fraser played in the 1916 NSWRL grand final victory over Souths. Fraser was a part of the 1917, 1919 and 1920 sides which won the premiership but the club did not need to play in a grand final those seasons as in those days an annual grand final was not mandatory.

In 1924, Fraser claimed his fifth premiership as a Balmain player defeating Souths in the grand final 3–0. Fraser retired the following year in 1925. At representative level he played for New South Wales on eight occasions.
