= John Davidson (rugby league) =

Australian rugby league footballer

Personal information
- Full name: John Davidson
- Born: 2 October 1961 (age 65) Sydney, New South Wales, Australia

Playing information
- Position: Centre, Wing
Club
Years	Team	Pld	T	G	FG	P
1980–88	Balmain Tigers	168	60	22	0	272
1989–90	Cronulla-Sutherland Sharks	39	11	2	0	48
	Total	207	71	24	0	320
- Source: As of 16 May 2019

John Davidson is an Australian former rugby league footballer who played in the 1980s and 1990s. He played for Balmain and Cronulla-Sutherland in the New South Wales Rugby League (NSWRL) competition. His brother Jamie Davidson also played for Balmain between 1983 and 1987.

== Background ==
Davidson was born in Sydney, New South Wales, Australia and played his junior rugby league for Birchgrove Scorpions.

== Playing career ==
Davidson made his first grade debut for Balmain in Round 6 1980 against Penrith at Leichhardt Oval. In 1981, Davidson played 10 games as Balmain finished last on the table claiming the wooden spoon. It was only the 4th time in the club's history where they had finished last. By 1983, Balmain coach Frank Stanton had assembled a strong team and the club reached the finals but were defeated in the semi-final by St George. In 1984, Balmain missed the finals after a disappointing season but Davidson did finish as the club's top point scorer.

By 1985, Balmain were genuine title contenders and finished second on the table. The club were then eliminated from the finals series after back to back losses with Davidson featuring in both games. In 1986, Balmain again reached the finals but were defeated by an experienced Canterbury side in the preliminary final. It was a similar story the following year in 1987 as the club reached the finals but fell short of a grand final appearance.

In the 1988 season, Balmain finally reached the grand final after years of heartbreak defeating Cronulla in the preliminary final. Davidson played in the first finals game against Penrith scoring a try but missed out on selection in the grand final which Balmain lost against Canterbury 24–12.

In 1989, Davidson joined Cronulla who had finished minor premiers the year before. Davidson played in the club's semi final defeat against eventual premiers Canberra. Davidson retired following the conclusion of the 1990 season.
