= Sid Ryan (rugby league) =

Australian rugby league footballer and coach

Personal information
- Full name: Sid Ryan
- Born: 18 November 1921
- Died: 9 May 2011 (aged 89)

Playing information
- Position: Second-row
Club
Years	Team	Pld	T	G	FG	P
1943–51	Balmain	104	5	0	0	15

Coaching information
Club
Years	Team	Gms	W	D	L	W%
1957	Balmain	18	9	0	9	50

Sid Ryan (1921−2011) was an Australian professional rugby league footballer who played in the 1940s and 1950s. He played for Balmain as a second rower.

== Playing career ==
Ryan made his first grade debut in 1943 and the following year won his first premiership with the club as Balmain defeated Newtown in the grand final 12–8. In 1946, Ryan played most of the season but missed out on the 1946 NSWRL grand final victory over St George.

Ryan won his second premiership with Balmain in 1947 as the club defeated Canterbury 13–9 in the grand final. Ryan played in his third grand final the following year but this time was on the losing side as Balmain were defeated by Western Suburbs 8–5. Ryan played for three more seasons before retiring at the end of 1951.

== Coaching career ==
After finishing his playing career, Ryan coached Balmain and the St George reserve grade side in the early 60s. Later in life, Ryan was inducted into the Balmain Tigers hall of fame and was a life member of the club. He died on 9 May 2011 aged 89.
