= Keith Aggett =

Australian rugby league footballer

Keith Agget
Personal information
- Full name: Keith William Aggett
- Born: 12 November 1931; Rozelle, New South Wales, Australia
- Died: 4 May 2017 (aged 85)

Playing information
- Position: Hooker
Club
Years	Team	Pld	T	G	FG	P
1953–55	Parramatta Eels	38	3	0	0	9
1956	Balmain Tigers	1	0	0	0	0
	Total	39	3	0	0	9

Keith Aggett (12 November 1931 − 4 May 2017) was an Australian former professional rugby league footballer who played in the 1950s. He played for the Parramatta Eels and the Balmain Tigers.

== Sources ==
- Whiticker, Alan & Hudson, Glen (2006) The Encyclopedia of Rugby League Players, Gavin Allen Publishing, Sydney
