= Lance Thompson (rugby league, born 1961) =

Australian rugby league footballer

Personal information
- Born: 23 July 1961 (age 63); Nyngan, New South Wales, Australia

Playing information
- Position: Centre, Five-eighth, Wing
Club
Years	Team	Pld	T	G	FG	P
1980	Balmain Tigers	2	0	0	0	0
1983	Newtown Jets	13	1	1	0	6
	Total	15	1	1	0	6

Lance Thompson (born 23 July 1961) is an Australian former professional rugby league footballer who played for the Balmain Tigers and the Newtown Jets in the New South Wales Rugby Football League (NSWRFL).

Thompson, a shearer's son from the town of Nyngan, started his NSWRFL career at Balmain. He appeared as Balmain's five-eighth in the first two rounds of the 1980 NSWRFL season, then didn't play first-grade until 1983, when he was with Newtown. In his only first-grade season for Newtown he played 13 premiership games, as a five-eighth, centre and winger.
