= Hayes Lauder =

Australian rugby league footballer

Personal information
- Full name: Hayes Lauder
- Born: 5 March 1977 (age 49)

Playing information
- Position: Prop, Second-row
Club
Years	Team	Pld	T	G	FG	P
1999	Balmain Tigers	7	0	0	0	0
2000	Wests Tigers	10	0	0	0	0
	Total	17	0	0	0	0

Hayes Lauder (born 5 February 1977) is a former professional rugby league footballer who played for the Balmain Tigers and Wests Tigers.

== Playing career ==
Lauder made his first grade debut for Balmain in round 11 of the 1999 NRL season against Brisbane at Leichhardt Oval. Lauder played a total of seven matches for Balmain in their final season as a stand-alone entity before they merged with Western Suburbs to form the Wests Tigers. Lauder played ten matches for the newly merged club in the 2000 NRL season.
