= Gavin Catanach =

Australian rugby league footballer

Personal information
- Full name: Gavin Catanach
- Born: 20 June 1970 (age 55)

Playing information
- Position: Prop
Club
Years	Team	Pld	T	G	FG	P
1989–92	Parramatta Eels	8	0	0	0	0
1993	Balmain Tigers	12	0	0	0	0
	Total	20	0	0	0	0
- Source: As of 17 February 2023

Gavin Catanach is an Australian former professional rugby league footballer who played in the 1980s and 1990s. He played for Balmain and Parramatta in the NSWRL competition.

== Playing career ==
Catanach made his first-grade debut for Parramatta in round 5 of the 1989 NSWRL season against North Sydney at North Sydney Oval. Catanach played eight matches for Parramatta over four years at the club. In 1993, Catanach joined Balmain playing 12 games. Catanach's final match in the top grade was in round 22 of the 1993 NSWRL season against his former side Parramatta at Parramatta Stadium.
