= David Anderson (rugby league) =

Australian rugby league footballer

Personal information
- Full name: David Anderson
- Born: 3 February 1969 (age 57)

Playing information
- Position: Wing
Club
Years	Team	Pld	T	G	FG	P
1991	Balmain Tigers	12	1	0	0	4
1992–93	Western Suburbs	23	4	0	0	16
1994–95	Rochdale Hornets	20	4	0	0	16
1996	Parramatta Eels	1	0	0	0	0
	Total	56	9	0	0	36
- Source: As of 22 December 2022

David Anderson is an Australian former professional rugby league footballer who played in 1990s. He played for Western Suburbs, Balmain Tigers and Parramatta Eels in the NSWRL/ARL competition and for Rochdale in England.

== Playing career ==
Anderson made his first grade debut for Balmain in round 1 of the 1991 NSWRL season against Canterbury-Bankstown at Leichhardt Oval. Anderson scored a try during Western Suburbs 26-16 loss. In 1992, Anderson joined Western Suburbs and played 23 games for the club over the next two seasons. Anderson then had a stint in England with Rochdale before returning to Australia and signing with Parramatta for the 1996 ARL season. Anderson made only one appearance for Parramatta which came in round 15 against Manly-Warringah with Parramatta losing 44-0 at Brookvale Oval.
