= Stephen Bosse =

Australian rugby league footballer

Personal information
- Full name: Stephen Bosse
- Born: 2 April 1974 (age 52)

Playing information
- Position: Prop
Club
Years	Team	Pld	T	G	FG	P
1994	Penrith Panthers	3	0	0	0	0
1997	Balmain Tigers	1	0	0	0	0
	Total	4	0	0	0	0
- Source: As of 6 January 2023

Stephen Bosse is an Australian former professional rugby league footballer who played in the 1990s. He played for Penrith and Balmain in the NSWRL/ARL competition.

== Playing career ==
Bosse made his first grade debut for Penrith in round 2 of the 1994 NSWRL season at Kogarah Oval. Bosse played at prop in Penrith's 8-6 victory. Bosse played a total of three games for Penrith in 1994. After having not played first grade for three years, Bosse signed with Balmain and made one appearance for the club against Illawarra in round 2 of the 1997 ARL season.
