= Jack Metcalf (rugby league) =

Australian rugby league footballer and administrator

Personal information
- Full name: John Metcalf
- Born: 16 May 1919; Cessnock, New South Wales, Australia
- Died: 6 November 2007 (aged 88); Kincumber, New South Wales, Australia

Playing information
- Position: Lock
Club
Years	Team	Pld	T	G	FG	P
1943–44	St. George	22	3	0	0	9
1945–46	Balmain	21	1	0	0	3
	Total	43	4	0	0	12
- Source: As of 30 August 2019

John Metcalf (1919-2007) was an Australian rugby league footballer who played in the 1940s.

Metcalf was a local rugby league footballer from Cessnock, New South Wales. He enlisted into the Australian Army in 1942 and was initially sent to Arncliffe in Sydney, and trialled with St. George in 1943.

He played two seasons with the Saints before transferring to Balmain in 1945. He played with both clubs while juggling duties with the AIF. He retired after receiving a badly broken leg in game late in the 1946 season, which ruled him out of the Balmain premiership winning team of 1946.

Melcalf died on 6 November 2007.
