= Grant Stuart =

Australian rugby league footballer (born 1975)

Personal information
- Born: 2 August 1975 (age 50) Sydney, New South Wales, Australia

Playing information
- Position: Centre, Lock
Club
Years	Team	Pld	T	G	FG	P
1994	Balmain Tigers	7	2	1	0	10
1998–99	Newcastle Knights	2	2	0	0	8
	Total	9	4	1	0	18

Grant Stuart (born 2 August 1975) is an Australian former professional rugby league footballer who played in the 1990s. He played for the Balmain Tigers in 1994 and the Newcastle Knights from 1998 to 1999.

== Playing career ==
Stuart made his first grade debut for Balmain in Round 13 1994 against Illawarra. Stuart made a total of 7 appearances for Balmain as the club finished last on the table claiming the wooden spoon. Stuart then joined Newcastle in 1998. Stuart then went on to make 1 appearance in both 1998 and 1999 before retiring.
