= Ted McFadden =

Australian rugby league footballer

Personal information
- Full name: James Edward McFadden
- Born: 13 April 1880 Orange, New South Wales, Australia
- Died: 29 June 1949 (aged 69) Balmain, New South Wales, Australia

Playing information
- Position: Second-row, Hooker
Club
| Years | Team | Pld | T | G | FG | P |
|---|---|---|---|---|---|---|
| 1908–10 | Balmain | 33 | 1 | 0 | 0 | 3 |
- Source: As of 15 February 2019

Ted 'Leather' McFadden (1880–1949) was an Australian professional rugby league footballer who played in the 1900s and 1910s. He played in the New South Wales Rugby Football League premiership. He was a foundation player of the Balmain club.

== Playing career ==
Originally from Orange, New South Wales, McFadden made his first grade debut for Balmain against Western Suburbs on 20 April 1908 at Birchgrove Oval, which was the club's first ever game and also the opening week of the inaugural NSWRL competition. Balmain went on to win the match 24–0 in front of 3000 spectators.

McFadden played with the club until the end of the 1910 season before retiring.

McFadden died on 29 June 1949 at Balmain Hospital.
