= Chris Morcombe =

Australian rugby league footballer

Personal information
- Full name: Christopher Morcombe
- Born: 27 May 1975 (age 51) Sydney, New South Wales, Australia

Playing information
- Position: Wing, Fullback
Club
Years	Team	Pld	T	G	FG	P
1994–99	Balmain Tigers	22	9	0	0	36

Chris Morcombe is an Australian former professional rugby league footballer who played in the 1990s. He played for Balmain in the New South Wales Rugby League (NSWRL) and NRL competitions.

== Playing career ==
Morcombe made his first grade debut for Balmain in round 6 1994 against Penrith at the WACA Ground with the match finishing in a 24–0 loss.

Morcombe played 5 games in his debut season as Balmain finished last on the table and claimed the wooden spoon. It was only the fourth time in the club's long history in which they finished last.

Morcombe would spend the next 4 years outside the top grade before returning to Balmain in 1999. Morcombe finished as the club's top try scorer in 1999 with 9 tries. He also played in the club's final ever game as a top grade side which came against the Canberra Raiders in round 26 1999 at Bruce Stadium with Canberra running out winners 42–14.

At the end of the 1999 NRL season, it was agreed that Balmain and fellow foundation club Western Suburbs would merge to form the Wests Tigers for the 2000 NRL season as part of the NRL's rationalisation policy. Morcombe was not offered a contract to play for the new team.
