= Ian McCann (rugby league) =

Australian rugby league footballer

Personal information
- Full name: Ian McCann

Playing information
- Position: Centre
Club
Years	Team	Pld	T	G	FG	P
1989–92	Balmain Tigers	32	5	17	0	54
1993	Penrith Panthers	6	0	0	0	0
	Total	38	5	17	0	54
- Source: As of 31 January 2023

Ian McCann is an Australian former professional rugby league footballer who played in the 1980s and 1990s. He played for Balmain and Penrith in the NSWRL competition.

== Playing career ==
McCann made his first grade debut for Balmain in round 13 of the 1989 NSWRL season against Eastern Suburbs at the Sydney Football Stadium. McCann made one further appearance that year in round 16 against North Sydney. McCann would make 32 appearances for the Balmain club over four years before joining Penrith in 1993.

He made his club debut for Penrith in round 2 against Canberra, coming off the bench, and would be starting lock the next week. He would hold a spot in first grade until round 5, and returning for two more appearances later in the season.
