= Henry Box (rugby league) =

Australian rugby league footballer (1916–1961)

Personal information
- Full name: Henry Box
- Born: 14 July 1916; Sydney, New South Wales, Australia
- Died: 26 January 1961 (aged 44); Newtown, New South Wales, Australia

Playing information
- Position: Halfback
Club
Years	Team	Pld	T	G	FG	P
1939	Newtown	7	1	0	0	3
1941–46	Balmain	44	4	0	0	12
	Total	51	5	0	0	15
- Source: As of 9 August 2019

Henry 'Gillie' Box (14 July 1916 – 26 January 1961) was an Australian rugby league footballer who played in the 1930s and 1940s.

Henry Box was known as 'Gillie'. He began his career in 1939 at Newtown before enjoying a long career at the Balmain club. A smart Halfback/five-eighth, 'Gillie' Box finished his career in 1946, age 30.

Box died in Newtown, New South Wales on 26 January 1961.
