= Tommy O'Donnell (rugby league) =

Australian rugby league footballer

Personal information
- Full name: Tommy O'Donnell

Playing information
- Position: Halfback, Five-eighth, Centre
Club
Years	Team	Pld	T	G	FG	P
1908–10	Balmain	20	3	0	0	9
- Source: As of 15 February 2019

Tommy O'Donnell was an Australian rugby league footballer who played in the 1900s and 1910s. He played for Balmain and was a foundation player of the club.

== Playing career ==
O'Donnell was a foundation player for Balmain in 1908 and competed in the club's first season which was also the first season of rugby league in Australia.

O'Donnell played in the club's first match against Western Suburbs on 20 April 1908 at Birchgrove Oval. Balmain went on to win the game 24–0 in front of 3000 spectators with O'Donnell playing at five-eighth.

O'Donnell played with Balmain up until the end of 1910 before retiring.
