= David Brooks (rugby league) =

Australian rugby league footballer

Personal information
- Full name: David John Brooks
- Born: 24 May 1962 (age 64) Walcha, New South Wales, Australia

Playing information
- Height: 183 cm (6 ft 0 in)
- Weight: 86 kg (13 st 8 lb)
- Position: Second-row
Club
Years	Team	Pld	T	G	FG	P
1983–92	Balmain Tigers	175	14	108	1	273
1987–88	→Hull FC	24	2	0	0	8
1991	→Chorley Borough	2	2	0	0	8
	Total	201	18	108	1	289
Representative
Years	Team	Pld	T	G	FG	P
1981	NSW Country	1	0	0	0	0
1985	New South Wales	1	0	0	0	0
1985	NSW City	1	0	0	0	0

David Brooks (born 24 May 1962) is an Australian former professional rugby league footballer who played in the 1980s and 1990s. A one-club man, Brooks played his first-grade career primarily with the Balmain Tigers in the New South Wales Rugby League premiership, with a couple of short stints in England in the off-season with Hull FC and later with Chorley Borough. Brooks primarily played in the second-row.

== Playing career ==
While attending McCarthy Catholic High School in Tamworth, Brooks played for the Australian Schoolboys team in 1979.

Brooks made his first grade debut for Balmain in round 1 of the 1983 season against South Sydney at Leichhardt Oval. Brooks ended his debut season as the club's top point scorer.

Brooks was selected to represent New South Wales as a second-rower for Game III of the 1985 State of Origin series.

Over the next few seasons, Balmain would feature regularly in the finals and in 1988 the club reached their first grand final since 1969. Brooks played at second-row in the club's 24-12 grand final loss against Canterbury-Bankstown at the Sydney Football Stadium.

Balmain would reach the grand final the following season against the Canberra Raiders but Brooks did not play in the finals series or the grand final itself. In 1990, Balmain reached what would be their last finals series with Brooks playing in the elimination semi-final which Balmain lost 0–16 against Manly-Warringah.

Brooks final game as a player came in 1992 in the reserve grade grand final against North Sydney which Balmain lost 28–14 at the Sydney Football Stadium.

== Sources ==
- Whiticker, Alan; Hudson, Glen (2007). The Encyclopedia of Rugby League Players. Wetherill Park, New South Wales: Gary Allen Pty Ltd. p. 609. ISBN 978-1-877082-93-1.
- Gary Lester, ed. (1983). The Sun Book of Rugby League – 1983. Sydney, New South Wales: John Fairfax Marketing. p. 12. ISBN 0-909558-83-3.
