= Jody Rudd =

Australian rugby league footballer

Personal information
- Full name: Jody Rudd
- Born: 10 May 1973 (age 53)

Playing information
- Position: Wing, Centre
Club
Years	Team	Pld	T	G	FG	P
1992–94	Illawarra Steelers	15	1	0	0	4
1995	North Sydney	5	0	0	0	0
1997–98	Balmain Tigers	2	0	0	0	0
	Total	22	1	0	0	4
- Source: As of 17 May 2019

Jody Rudd is an Australian former professional rugby league footballer who played in the 1990s. He played for Balmain, North Sydney and Illawarra in the Australian Rugby League, NRL and New South Wales Rugby League (NSWRL) competitions.

== Playing career ==
Rudd made his first grade debut for Illawarra in Round 20 1992 against Penrith at WIN Stadium coming off the bench in a 16-2 win. Rudd did not make an appearance for Illawarra in 1993 but returned in 1994 becoming a more regular starter in the team which narrowly missed out on the finals.

Rudd then signed with North Sydney for the 1995 season who went within one game of the grand final in 1994. Rudd would only make 5 appearances over 2 seasons for Norths as Rudd struggled to find a place in the team. In 1997, Rudd joined Balmain and made 7 appearances over 2 seasons. Rudd's final game in first grade was against Penrith in Round 5 1998 at Leichhardt Oval which finished in a 30-10 victory.

== Post playing ==
Rudd was a football manager with Western Suburbs in the early 2000s. He then became coach of Balmain-Ryde in 2005. In 2019, Rudd became head coach of the Riverina rugby league team.
