= Steve Benkic =

Australian rugby league footballer

Personal information
- Full name: Steve Benkic
- Born: 28 June 1969 (age 55)

Playing information
- Position: Centre
Club
Years	Team	Pld	T	G	FG	P
1988–90	Balmain	18	1	0	0	4
1991–92	Eastern Suburbs	16	4	2	0	20
	Total	34	5	2	0	24
- Source: As of 13 January 2023

Steve Benkic is an Australian former professional rugby league footballer who played in the 1980s and 1990s. He played for Eastern Suburbs and Balmain in NSWRL competition.

== Playing career ==
Benkic made his first grade debut for Balmain in round 15 of the 1988 NSWRL season against the Illawarra Steelers. Benkic played off the bench in a 24-12 victory at WIN Stadium. In 1989, Benkic played 13 games for Balmain as the club reached the grand final, however Benkic did not feature in the clubs finals campaign. In 1990, Benkic played four matches including Balmain's last ever finals match which was a 16-0 loss to Manly. Benkic later played two seasons with the Eastern Suburbs club in 1991 and 1992.
