= Reg Latta =

Australian RL coach and former Australia international rugby league footballer

Personal information
- Full name: Reginald Augustine Latta
- Born: 11 June 1897 Balmain, New South Wales
- Died: 30 July 1970 (aged 73) Drummoyne, New South Wales

Playing information
- Position: Lock
Club
Years	Team	Pld	T	G	FG	P
1916–30	Balmain Tigers	161	60	0	0	180
Representative
Years	Team	Pld	T	G	FG	P
1919–25	New South Wales	31	12	0	0	36
1919–24	Australia	4	0	0	0	0
1922–25	Metropolis	3	1	1	0	5

Coaching information
Club
Years	Team	Gms	W	D	L	W%
1929–31	Balmain	30	11	1	18	37
- Source: As of 30 April 2020
- Relatives: Alf Latta (brother)

Reginald Augustine 'Whip' Latta (1897–1970) was an Australian professional rugby league footballer who played in the 1910s and 1920s who also became a coach. An Australia national and New South Wales state representative forward, he played his club football in Sydney for the Balmain club, with whom he won five premierships. Latta also coached the team.

== Background ==
Latta was born in Balmain, New South Wales to parents James and Mary Latta in 1897.

== Playing career ==
He came through the junior ranks to debut for Balmain in 1916 as a 19-year-old. He went on to play fourteen first grade seasons with Balmain between 1916–1930. He was a blonde haired lock-forward and he was known by the nickname 'Whip'. He won five premierships with Balmain in 1916, 1917, 1919, 1920 and 1924. He represented New South Wales on eleven occasions during : 1921, 1923, 1924 and 1925. He also represented Australia on five occasions including touring with the 1921-22 Kangaroos as was named the Champion Australian Player of that tour. He was also the first Balmain player to play more than 200 games for the club.

== Post-playing ==
Latta would coach Balmain in 1929 and 1931.

== Family ==
Reg Latta's older brother Alfred played in the First Rugby League match in 1908 scoring the first try and kicking the first goal when Balmain defeated Western Suburbs. Alfred Latta played for Balmain 1908–12, he then became club secretary, and from 1916 served on the League committee, (executive), as a NSW Selector, then Australian Selector. Alfred also held the position of NSWRFL Vice President when he died in 1947. Alfred Latta had three sons, Jack who was graded as a referee at age 22, Alfred Junior also a referee, mainly 2nd grade and 1st grade touch judge, his other son Ernie played first grade for Balmain as halfback and fullback. Reg Latta's other brother Harry also played first grade for Balmain. There were six members of the Latta family involved in Rugby League prior to 1940 and they are often confused.

The following appears in the original quote I believe it should refer to Alfred Latta and not Reg Latta. "also served Balmain as a committeeman and office-holder for many years. He was awarded Life Membership of the NSWRFL in 1937 for services to the game."

== Death ==
Latta died on 30 July 1970 at his Drummoyne home aged 73.
