= Jamie Corcoran =

Australian rugby league footballer

Personal information
- Full name: Jamie Corcoran
- Born: 10 December 1968 (age 56)

Playing information
- Position: Centre
Club
Years	Team	Pld	T	G	FG	P
1989–91	Canterbury Bulldogs	35	8	21	0	74
1993	Balmain Tigers	18	3	15	0	42
1994–95	South Sydney	16	5	0	0	20
1996	Wakefield Trinity	7	1	2	0	8
	Total	76	17	38	0	144
- Source: As of 20 February 2024

Jamie Corcoran is an Australian former professional rugby league footballer who played in the 1980s and 1990s. He played for Canterbury-Bankstown, Balmain and South Sydney in the NSWRL competition. He also played for Wakefield Trinity in England.

== Playing career ==
In round 2 of the 1989 NSWRL season, Corcoran made his first grade debut for the defending premiers Canterbury against Cronulla at Belmore Sports Ground scoring one try and kicking three goals in a 22–2 victory. Corcoran would play infrequently with the Canterbury club over the next three seasons. He would later have stints with Balmain and South Sydney. In 1996, Corcoran played one season with Wakefield Trinity in England.
