= Leigh Hennessy (rugby league) =

Australian rugby league player

Personal information
- Full name: Leigh Stephen Hennessy
- Born: 14 August 1976 (age 48); Sydney, New South Wales, New South Wales

Playing information
- Position: Fullback, Wing
Club
Years	Team	Pld	T	G	FG	P
1998	Balmain	2	0	2	0	4

Leigh Hennessy (born 14 August 1976) is an Australian former professional rugby league footballer who played with the Balmain Tigers in the National Rugby League (NRL). He primarily played at fullback.

== Playing career ==
Hennessy was graded by the now defunct Balmain Tigers in 1997. He made his first grade debut at fullback in his side's 30−16 loss to the Newcastle Knights at Leichhardt Oval in round 23 of the 1998 season, replacing the injured goal kicking fullback Shannon Nevin. Hennessy also scored his only points in first grade in this match, kicking 2 goals. His final game of first grade came the following week in the Tigers' 40−4 loss to the Sydney City Roosters at Leichhardt Oval in round 24 of the 1998 season. The Tigers finished the season in 13th position and folded at the end of following the season.

Hennessy remained at Balmain during the 1999 season, but did not make any appearances in first grade. Balmain controversially merged with rivals the Western Suburbs Magpies to form the Wests Tigers as part of the NRL's rationalization strategy. Hennessy was not offered a contract to play with the newly formed team for the 2000 NRL season and subsequently never played first grade rugby league again.

== Post career ==
After his departure from Balmain, Hennessy went on to play, coach, and become club president of the Eden Tigers in the Group 16 competition.
