= Steve Lavers =

Australian rugby league footballer

Personal information
- Full name: Steve Lavers
- Born: 20 August 1954 (age 72) Sydney, New South Wales, Australia

Playing information
- Position: Second-row, Prop
Club
Years	Team	Pld	T	G	FG	P
1975–82	Balmain Tigers	92	5	0	0	15
Representative
Years	Team	Pld	T	G	FG	P
1976	New South Wales	1	0	0	0	0
1976	NSW City	1	1	0	0	3
- Source: As of 16 May 2019

Steve Lavers is an Australian former rugby league footballer who played in the 1970s and 1980s. He played for Balmain in the New South Wales Rugby League (NSWRL) competition.

== Playing career ==
Lavers made his first grade debut for Balmain in 1975. In 1976, Lavers earned selection for New South Wales and New South Wales City teams.

In 1977, Balmain reached the finals but were defeated by an experienced Eastern Suburbs side 26-2 at the Sydney Cricket Ground. Lavers continued to be a regular within the Balmain team as they struggled on the field during the following seasons culminating with a last placed finish in 1981 although they did reach the 1980 Tooth Cup final against Parramatta. Lavers retired following the conclusion of the 1982 season.

== Post playing ==
Lavers went on to become a football manager at Wests Tigers in the 2000s and later on became a development manager at the club.
