= Gary Edwards (rugby league) =

Australian rugby league footballer

Personal information
- Born: 10 November 1970 (age 55)

Playing information
- Position: Wing
Club
Years	Team	Pld	T	G	FG	P
1993–94	North Sydney Bears	4	0	0	0	0
1995–97	Balmain Tigers	30	10	0	0	40
	Total	34	10	0	0	40
Representative
Years	Team	Pld	T	G	FG	P
1994	Australian Aborigines	1	4	0	0	16

Gary Edwards is an Australian former rugby league footballer who played in the 1990s. He played for the Balmain and North Sydney in the New South Wales Rugby League (NSWRL) and ARL competitions.

== Playing career ==
Edwards made his first grade debut for North Sydney against Balmain in round 15 1993 at North Sydney Oval. Edwards only made 4 appearances for Norths over 2 seasons and was released by the club after failing to break his way into the first team.

He played in the 1994 Pacific Cup Round 4 38-20 win over NZ Māori team, scoring 4 tries on 5 November 1994.

In 1995, Edwards signed for Balmain who had recently changed their name to the "Sydney Tigers" and moved their home games to Parramatta Stadium at the start of the Super League war. The drastic move followed other clubs such as Canterbury who had changed their name to the "Sydney Bulldogs" and also relocated to Parramatta.

Edwards scored 2 tries on debut for the club in round 1 1995 as they defeated Eastern Suburbs 24–18 at Parramatta Stadium. In round 3 1995, Edwards scored his second double of the year as Balmain defeated the North Queensland Cowboys 38–16. Edwards would finish the year with 6 tries from 12 matches.

In 1996, Edwards scored 4 tries in 15 games as the club finished 12th on the table. Before the start of the 1997 season, Balmain relocated their home games back to Leichhardt Oval and reverted to their original name after the Sydney Tigers experiment was deemed a failure with the average attendance for home matches over the two seasons only reaching 6000 people.

Edwards final game for Balmain came in round 8 1997 against the South Queensland Crushers which Balmain won 18–16 at Lang Park.
