= Greg Donaghey =

Australian rugby league footballer

Personal information
- Full name: Greg Donaghey
- Born: 24 March 1974 (age 50)

Playing information
- Position: Centre, Wing
Club
| Years | Team | Pld | T | G | FG | P |
|---|---|---|---|---|---|---|
| 1994 | Manly-Warringah | 2 | 0 | 0 | 0 | 0 |
| 1997–98 | Balmain | 32 | 4 | 0 | 0 | 16 |
| | Total | 34 | 4 | 0 | 0 | 16 |
- Source: As of 16 January 2023

Greg Donaghey is an Australian former professional rugby league footballer who played in the 1990s. He played for Manly-Warringah and Balmain in NSWRL, ARL and NRL competitions.

== Playing career ==
Donaghey made his first grade debut for Manly in round 21 of the 1994 NSWRL season against South Sydney. In Donaghey's second game in the top grade, he played off the bench in Manly's minor preliminary semi-final loss against Brisbane. After being out of first grade for two years, Donaghey signed a contract to join Balmain ahead of the 1997 ARL season. Donaghey made 32 appearances over two seasons with the club.
