= Mick Russell (rugby league) =

Australian rugby league footballer (1893–1956)

Personal information
- Full name: Emanuel Joseph Russell
- Born: 22 January 1893 Milton, New South Wales, Australia
- Died: 10 February 1956 (aged 63)

Playing information
- Position: Prop, Second-row
Club
Years	Team	Pld	T	G	FG	P
1919–24	Balmain Tigers	65	10	89	0	208

Emanuel Joseph Russell (22 January 1893 – 10 February 1956) was an Australian rugby league footballer.

Born in Milton, Russell played as a forward for Balmain between 1919 and 1924, during which he participated in three premiership–winning campaigns. He was often utilised as a goal–kicker and gained Metropolis (NSW City) representative honours. His brother Tony also played for Balmain.

Russell was also a competitive sailor, racing on 18 footers. He won NSW state championships as a swimmer for the Balmain District League Swimming Club, specialising in the 100, 220 and 400 yard events.
