= Mick Liubinskas =

Australian rugby league footballer

Personal information
- Full name: Michael Liubinskas
- Born: 19 September 1954 (age 72) Perth, Western Australia, Australia

Playing information
- Position: Prop, Second-row
Club
Years	Team	Pld	T	G	FG	P
1974–78	Western Suburbs	44	10	0	0	30
1979	Balmain Tigers	2	0	0	0	0
	Total	46	10	0	0	30
- Source: As of 5 January 2023

Mick Liubinskas is an Australian former professional rugby league footballer who played in the 1970s. He played for Western Suburbs and Balmain in the NSWRL competition.

== Playing career ==
Liubinskas made his first grade debut for Western Suburbs in round 2 of the 1974 NSWRFL season against North Sydney at Lidcombe Oval with the match finishing in an 18-18 draw. He would play 18 games throughout the year including the clubs 25-2 preliminary final loss to Eastern Suburbs. In round 15 of the 1975 season, Liubinskas was embroiled in controversy when he was used as an illegal replacement during the clubs 7-7 draw with Canterbury. Western Suburbs were subsequently stripped of their competition point earned by the NSWRL. This eventually led to an historic three-way play off for fifth place between Balmain, Wests and Parramatta. Western Suburbs would have qualified for the finals had it not been for the stripped point. In 1978, Liubinskas played two games for Western Suburbs as they claimed the Minor Premiership. Liubinskas transferred to Balmain in 1979 but only featured in two matches for the club. He later went on to play for Umina on the Central Coast.
