= Leo Nosworthy =

Australian RL coach and former rugby league footballer (1927–2021)

Personal information
- Full name: Leo Neville Nosworthy
- Born: 21 November 1927
- Died: 13 April 2021 (aged 93)

Playing information
- Position: Wing
Club
Years	Team	Pld	T	G	FG	P
1948–52	Balmain	64	27	0	0	81

Coaching information
Club
Years	Team	Gms	W	D	L	W%
1969–73	Balmain Tigers	116	57	2	57	49

Leo Nosworthy (21 November 1927 – 13 April 2021) was an Australian rugby league footballer who played in the 1940s and 1950s. In 1969, he became the premiership winning coach of the Balmain Tigers rugby league team.

== Playing career ==
Nosworthy was a winger who played for Balmain for four seasons between 1948–1950 and 1952.

== Coaching career ==
Although his Sydney career was brief, Nosworthy was a very successful captain-coach in rural New South Wales at Dubbo and Narromine.

As a player, he represented Western Division against touring French teams in 1951 and 1955. He returned to Balmain to coach third grade in 1963, and by 1967, Nosworthy had coached the Tigers' reserve grade team to the premiership.

In 1969, Nosworthy was appointed first grade coach of Balmain, replacing the recently retired Tigers' legend Keith Barnes. Through Nosworthy's guidance, he took Balmain to the finals, and in what many considered a huge upset, he coached them to victory in the 1969 Grand Final. He remained as first grade coach until 1973 before retiring from the position.
