= Stephen Scahill =

Australian rugby league player

Personal information
- Full name: Stephen Scahill
- Born: 19 November 1973 (age 51); Sydney, New South Wales, Australia
- Height: 175 cm (5 ft 9 in)
- Weight: 85 kg (13 st 5 lb)

Playing information
- Position: Five-eighth, Hooker
Club
Years	Team	Pld	T	G	FG	P
1993–95	Balmain Tigers	16	1	0	0	4

Stephen Scahill (/ˈskeɪl/) (born 19 November 1973) is an Australian former professional rugby league player who played in the 1990s. He played his entire club football career with the Balmain Tigers. He played most of his career at hooker.

== Playing career ==
Scahill was graded by the Balmain Tigers in 1993. He made his first grade debut at five-eighth in his side's 19−18 victory over the South Sydney Rabbitohs at the Sydney Cricket Ground in round 12 of the 1993 season. With the retirement of long serving hooker Benny Elias at the end of the 1994 season, Scahill shifted into the hooking role where he would play the remainder of his career.

Scahill played his final game of first grade in his side's 44−6 loss to the Sydney City Roosters in round 22 of the 1995 season. Scahill was released by the Tigers at the end of the season and never played first grade rugby league again. In total, Scahill played 16 games and scored 1 try.
