= Roland Scahill =

American theater agent and fraudster

Roland Scahill (born January 17, 1975) is an American former theater agent and convicted fraudster. In 2017, Scahill was convicted and sentenced to six months in jail after pleading guilty to stealing $205,000 by claiming to be producing a play based on the life of Kathleen Battle.
