= Greg Cox (rugby league) =

Australian rugby league footballer

Personal information
- Full name: Gregory Cox
- Born: 2 May 1957 (age 67); Sydney, New South Wales, Australia

Playing information
- Position: Halfback, Fullback
Club
Years	Team	Pld	T	G	FG	P
1976–77	Balmain	44	8	130	0	284
1978–80	Cronulla-Sutherland	35	6	41	0	100
1981–84	Western Suburbs	50	3	98	0	205
	Total	129	17	269	0	589
- Source: As of 30 May 2019

Greg Cox is an Australian former rugby league footballer who played in the 1970s and 1980s. He played for Balmain, Western Suburbs and Cronulla-Sutherland in the New South Wales Rugby League (NSWRL) competition.

== Playing career ==
Cox made his first grade debut for Balmain in 1976 and finished the club's top point scorer. In 1977, Balmain reached the semi-finals against Eastern Suburbs but were defeated 26–2. Cox again finished as Balmain's top point scorer with 187 points.

In 1978, Cox joined Cronulla but only made 5 appearances during the season and missed out on playing in the club's grand final defeat and subsequent replay. In 1979, Cronulla again made the finals and Cox played in the semi-final defeat against Canterbury.

In 1981, Cox joined Western Suburbs. Cox finished as the club's top point scorer in 1982 and played in the teams minor preliminary final defeat against Eastern Suburbs. Cox played with Wests until the end of 1984 but his final two seasons at the club ended with the side finishing last on the table.
