= 1939 NSWRFL season =

Rugby league competition

1939 New South Wales Rugby Football League
- Teams: 8
- Premiers: Balmain (7th title)
- Minor premiers: Balmain (7th title)
- Matches played: 59
- Points scored: 1655
- Top points scorer(s): Neville Smith (97)
- Wooden spoon: Newtown (4th spoon)
- Top try-scorer(s): Sid Goodwin (18)

The 1939 New South Wales Rugby Football League premiership was the thirty-second season of Sydney’s top-level rugby league club competition, Australia’s first. Eight teams from across the city contested the premiership during the season, which lasted from April until September and culminated in Balmain’s victory over South Sydney in the final.

== Season summary ==
This was to be the St. George club’s final season at Earl Park, Arncliffe, the following season moving back to Hurstville Oval.

=== Teams ===
- Balmain, formed on January 23, 1908, at Balmain Town Hall
- Canterbury-Bankstown
- Eastern Suburbs, formed on January 24, 1908, at Paddington Town Hall
- Newtown, formed on January 14, 1908
- North Sydney, formed on February 7, 1908
- South Sydney, formed on January 17, 1908, at Redfern Town Hall
- St. George, formed on November 8, 1920, at Kogarah School of Arts
- Western Suburbs, formed on February 4, 1908

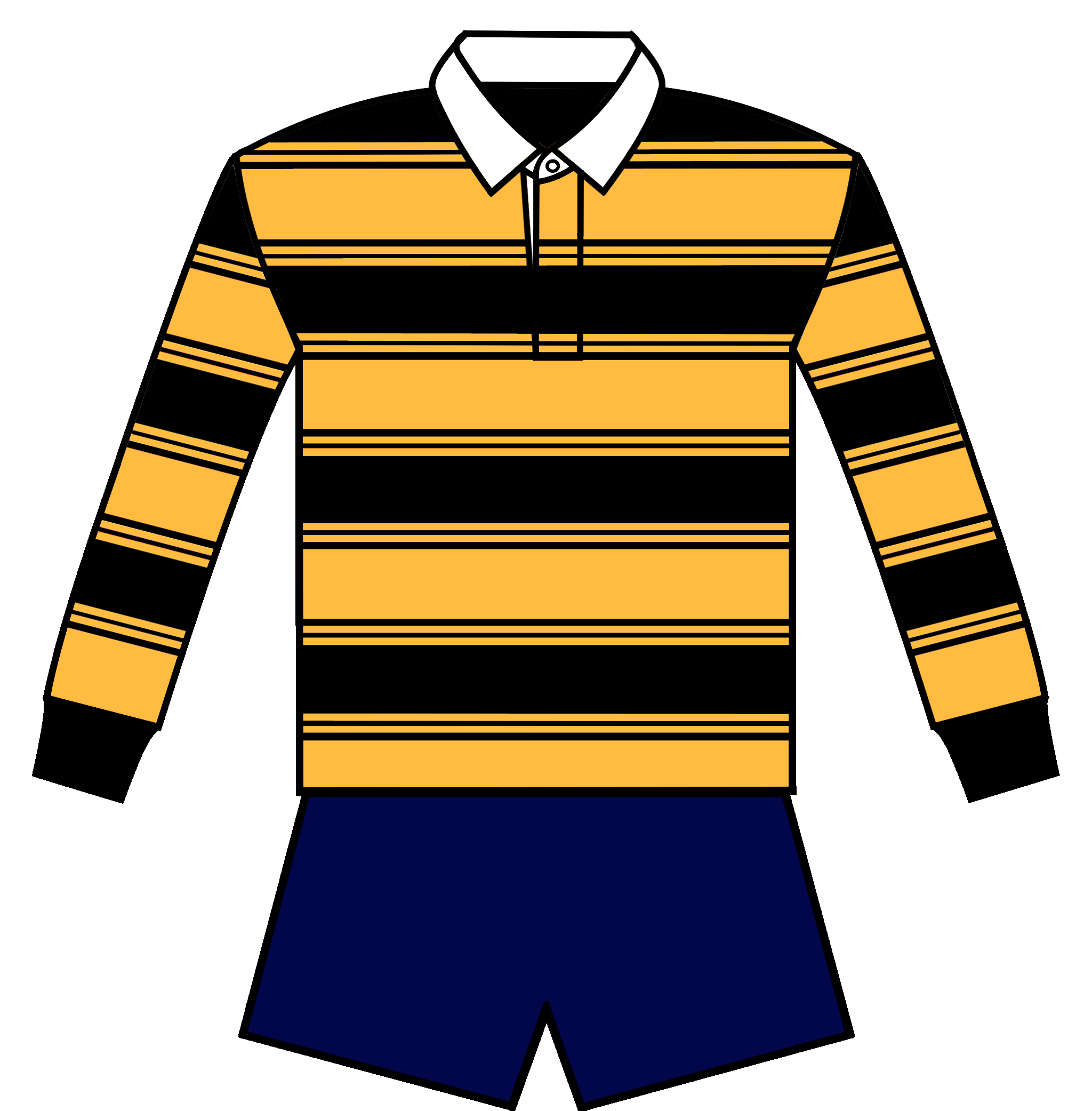
Balmain 32nd season Ground: Leichhardt Oval; Coach: Bill Kelly; Captain: Sid Goodwin

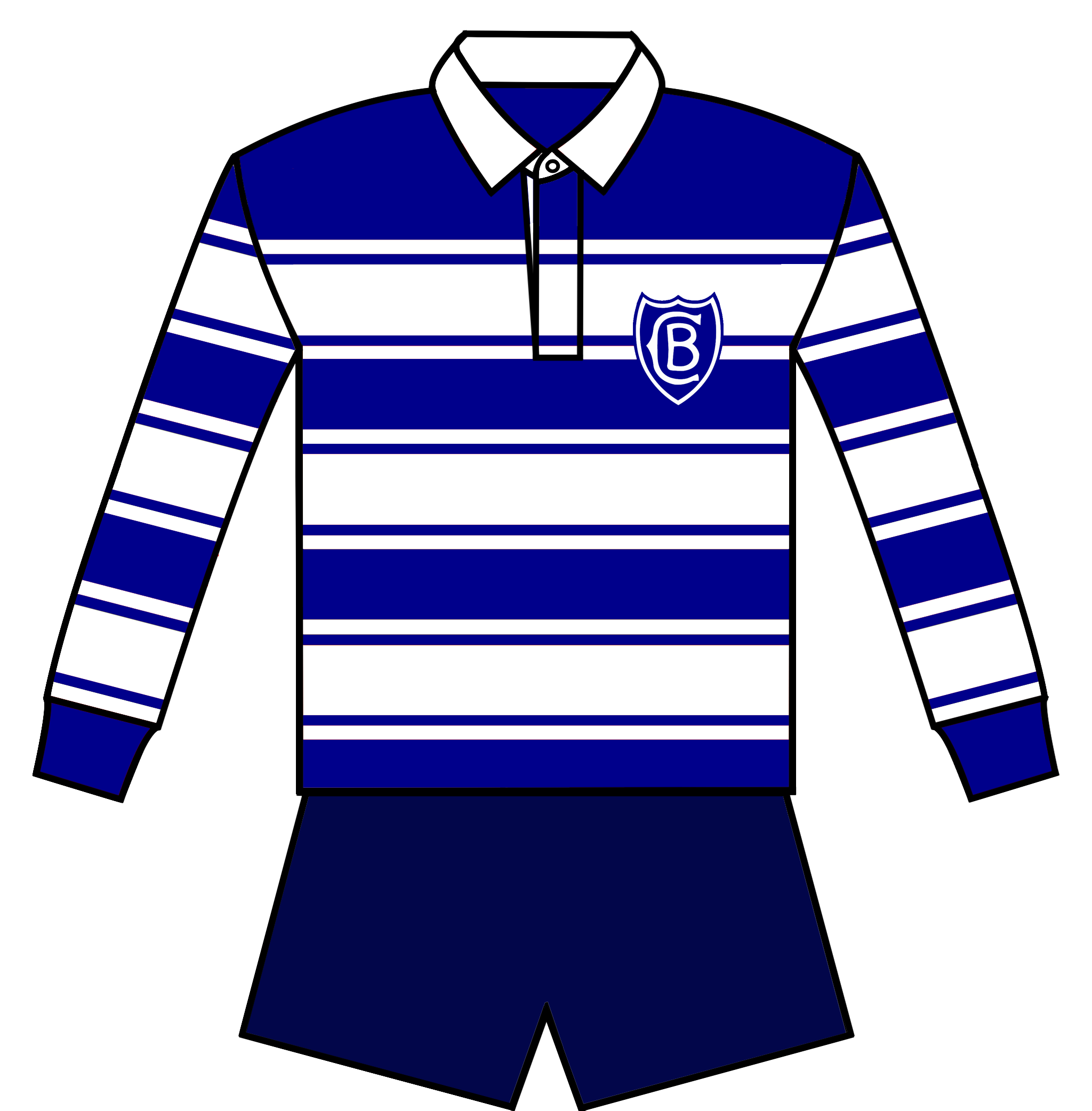
Canterbury-Bankstown 5th season Ground: Belmore Oval; Coach: Jerry Brien; Captain: Alan Brady

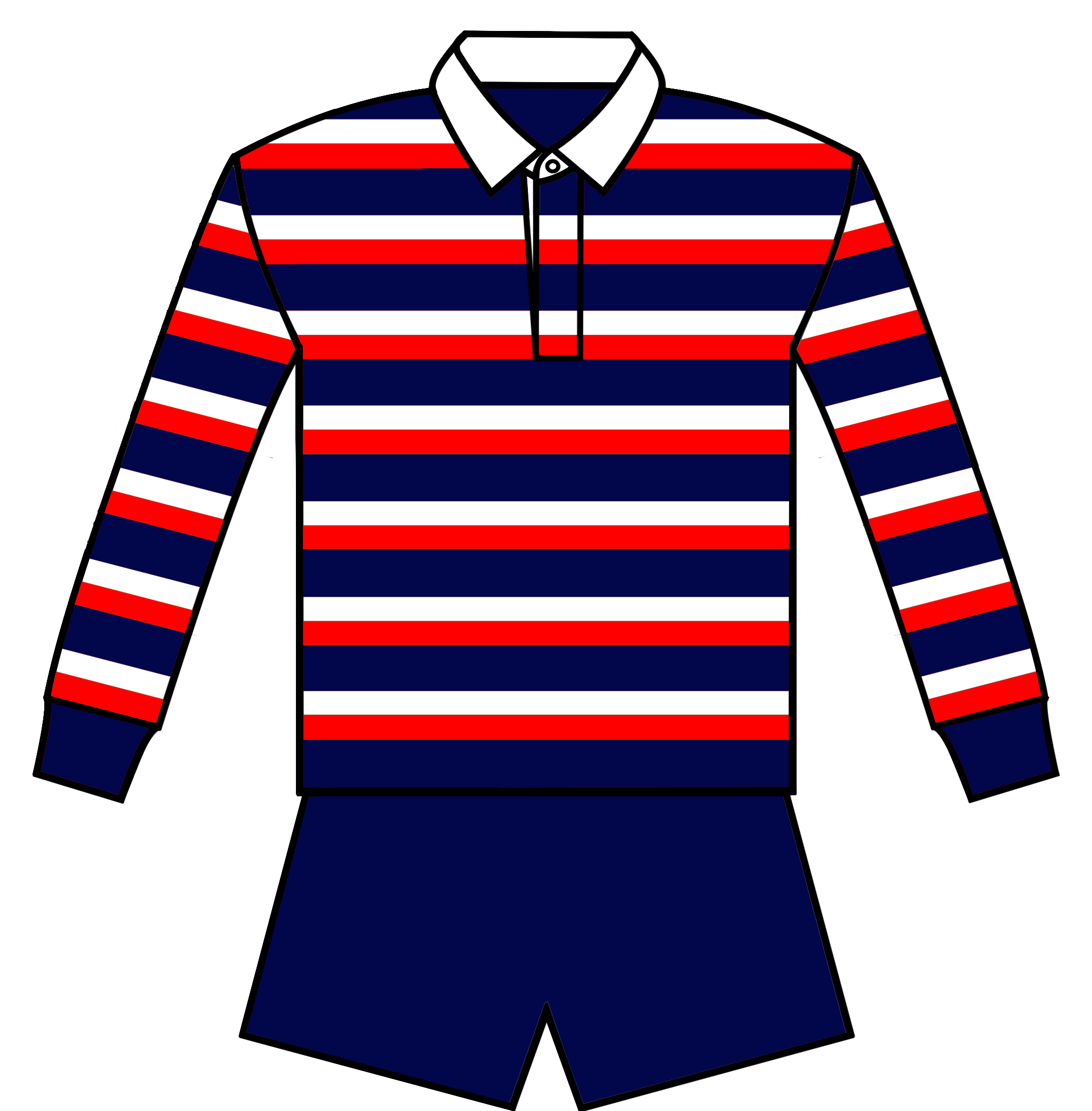
Eastern Suburbs 32nd season Ground: Sports Ground; Captain-coach: Ray Stehr

Newtown 32nd season Ground: Henson Park; Coach: Frank Burge; Captain: Allan Ellis

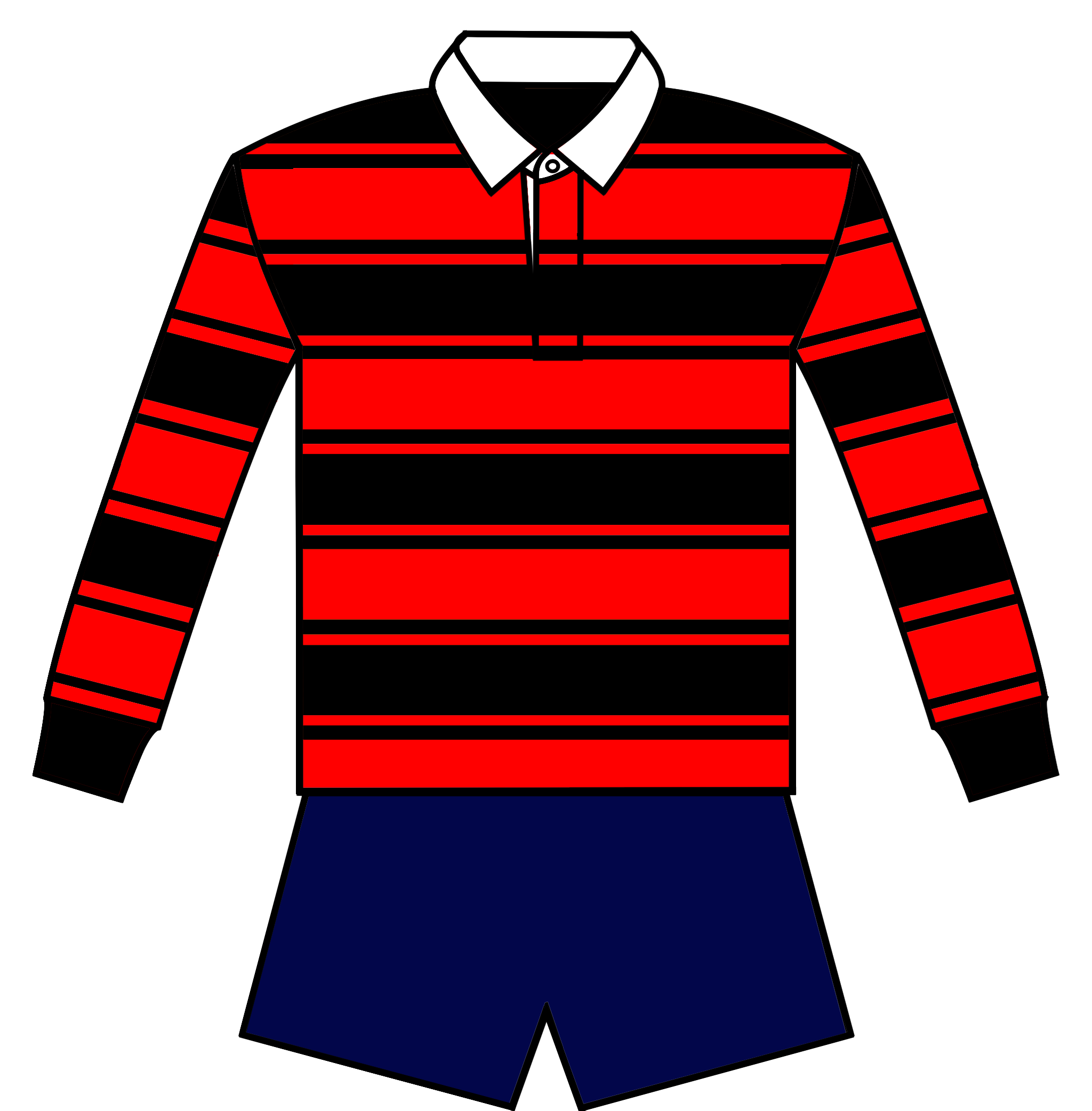
North Sydney 32nd season Ground: North Sydney Oval; Coach: Bob Williams; Captain: Roy Thompson

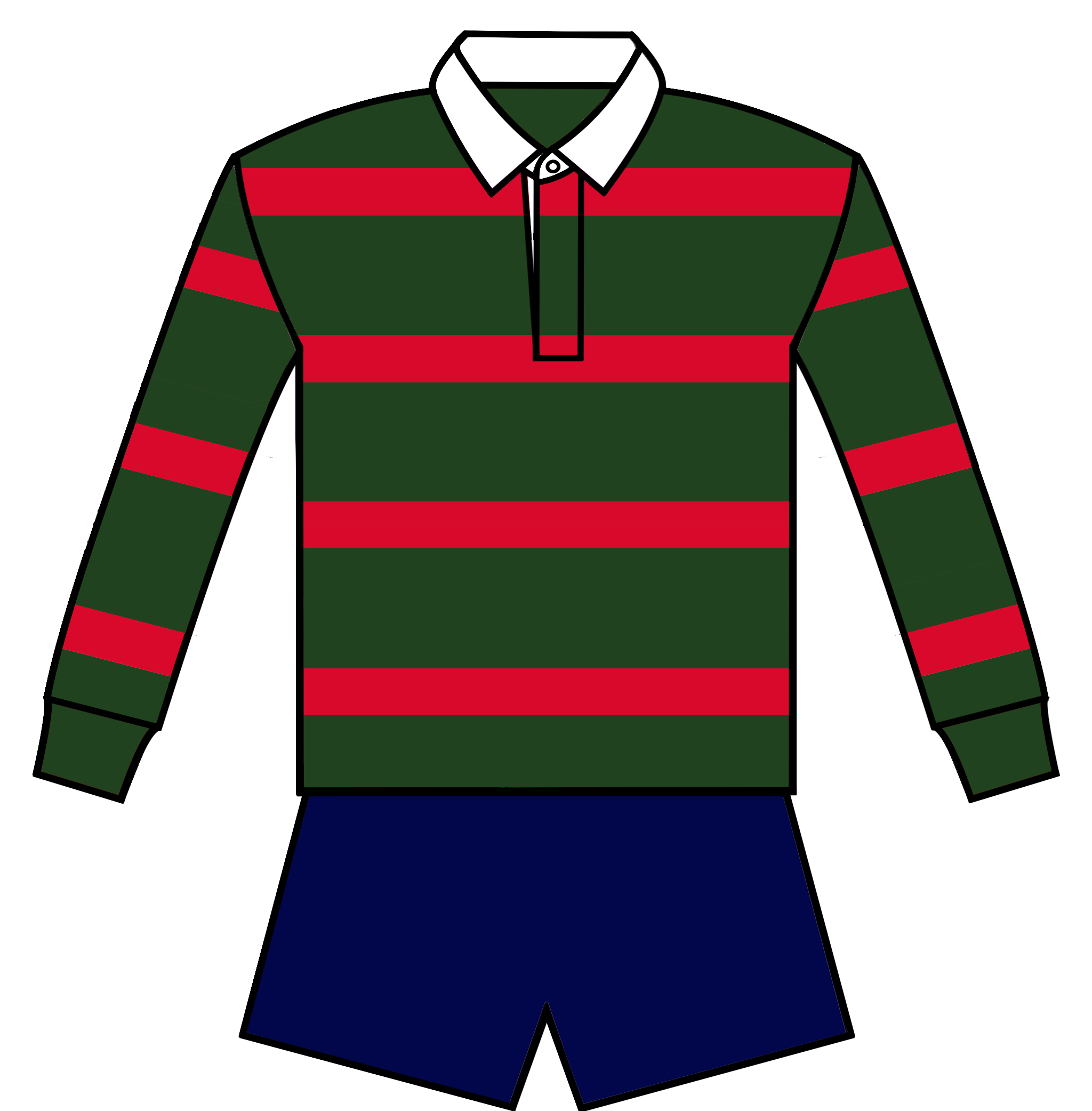
South Sydney 32nd season Ground: Sports Ground; Coach: Charlie Lynch; Captain: Fred Felsch

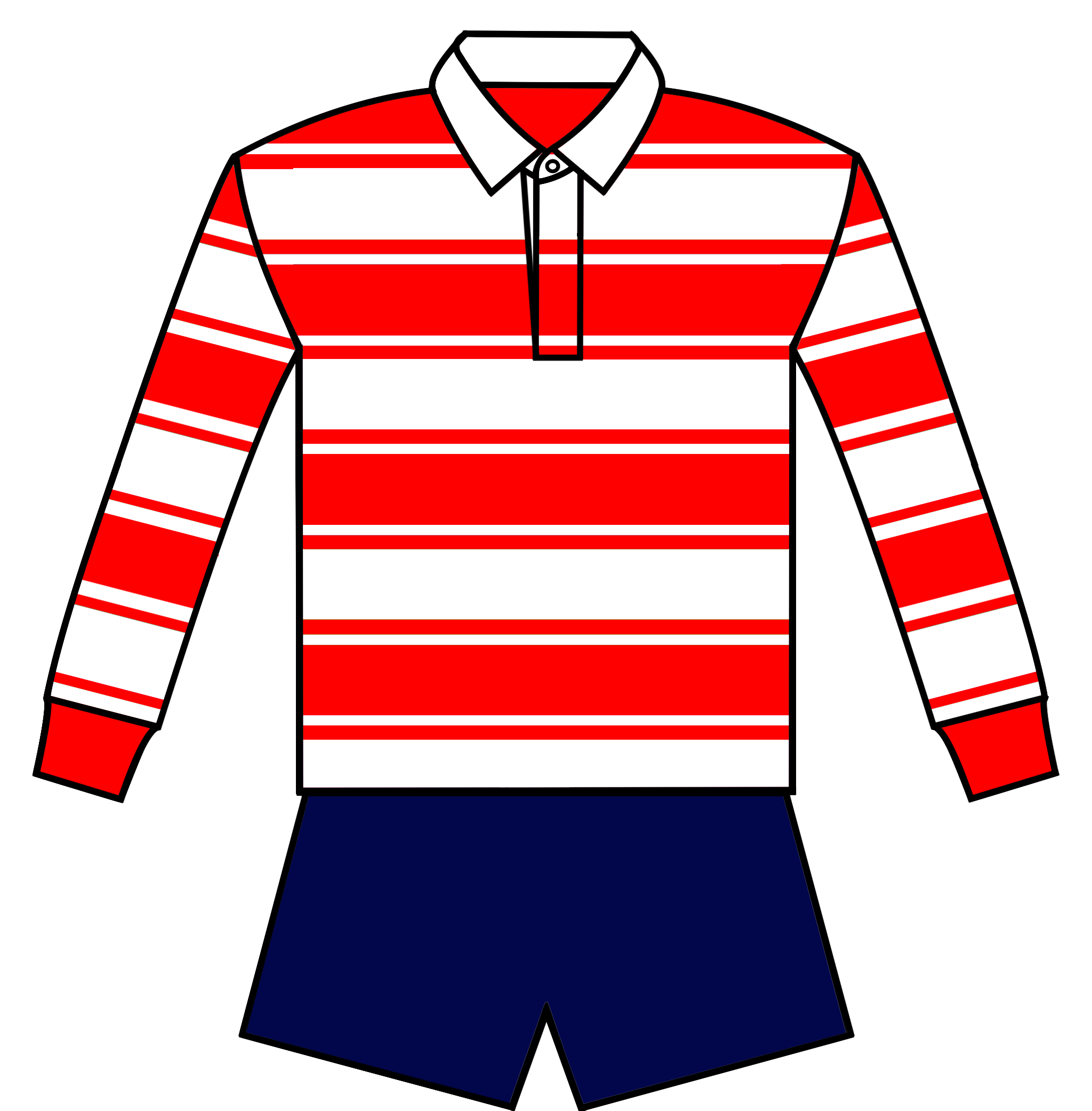
St. George 19th season Ground: Earl Park; Captain-coach: Neville Smith

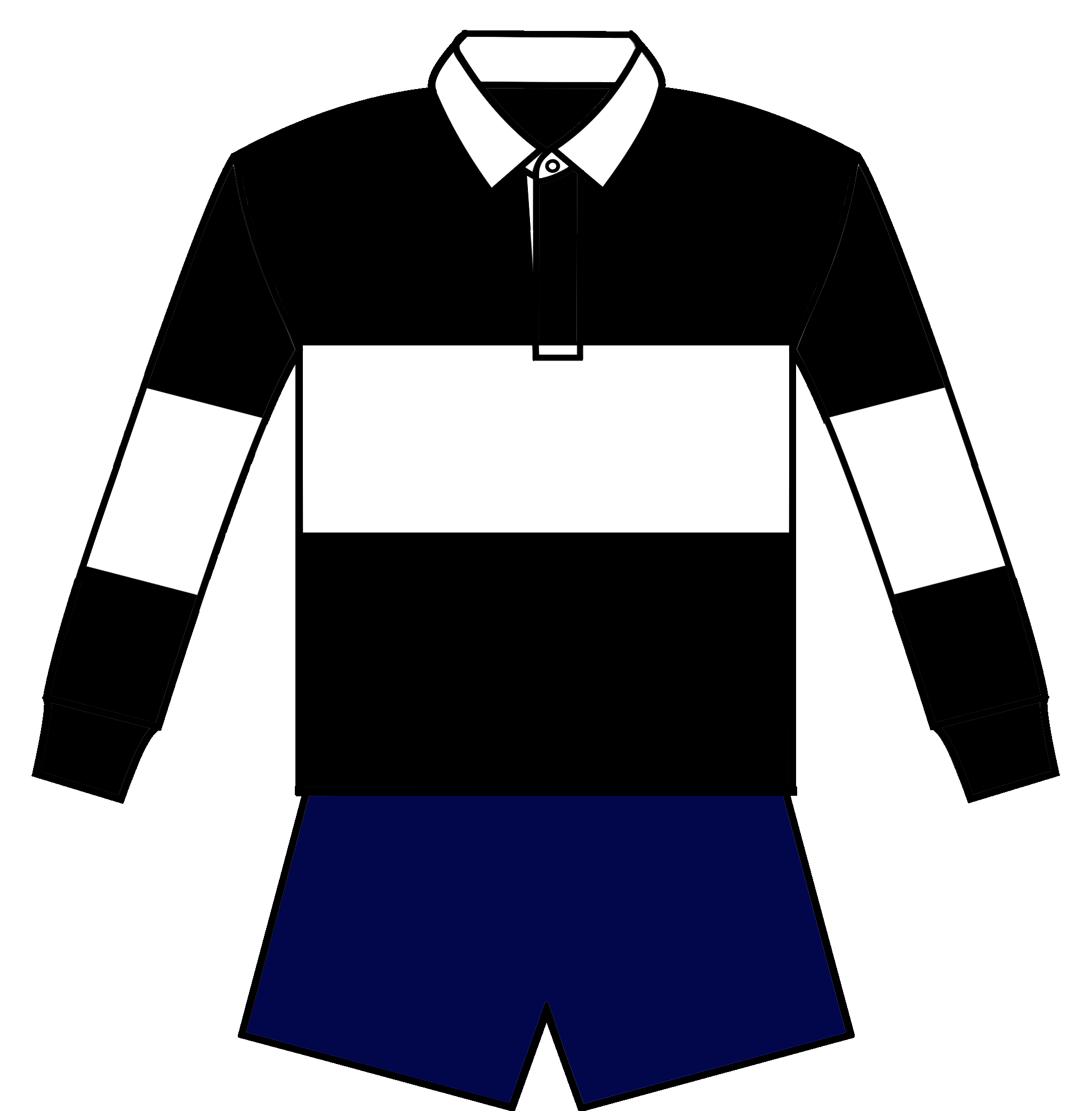
Western Suburbs 32nd season Ground: Pratten Park; Coach: Jim Craig; Captain: Albert McGuinness

== Ladder ==
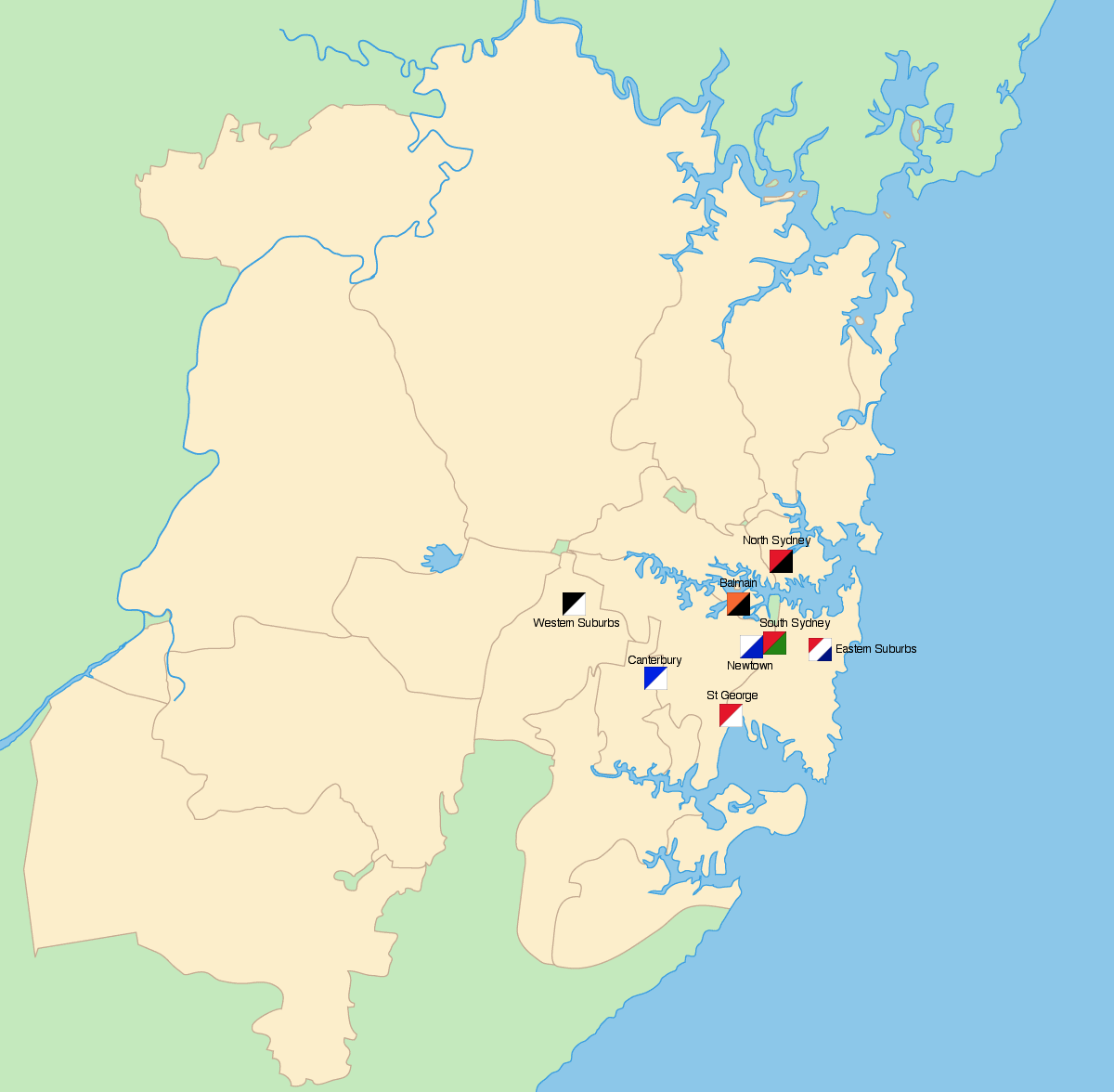
The geographical locations of the teams that contested the 1939 premiership across Sydney.

	Team	Pld	W	D	L	PF	PA	PD	Pts
1	Balmain	14	10	2	2	249	115	+134	22
2	St. George	14	10	0	4	268	169	+99	20
3	Canterbury	14	10	0	4	234	155	+79	20
4	South Sydney	14	9	0	5	219	158	+61	18
5	Eastern Suburbs	14	8	0	6	192	184	+8	16
6	Western Suburbs	14	2	2	10	148	213	-65	6
7	North Sydney	14	2	2	10	129	272	-143	6
8	Newtown	14	2	0	12	124	297	-173	4

== Finals ==
In the two semi finals, minor premiers Balmain narrowly defeated Canterbury whilst fourth-placed South Sydney beat second-placed St. George.

Home	Score	Away	Match Information
Home	Score	Away	Date and Time	Venue	Referee	Crowd
Semifinals
Balmain	13–9	Canterbury	19 August 1939	Sydney Cricket Ground	George Bishop	23,774
St. George	10–23	South Sydney	26 August 1939	Sydney Cricket Ground	Tom McMahon	21,722
Final
Balmain	33–4	South Sydney	2 September 1939	Sydney Cricket Ground	George Bishop	26,972

=== Premiership final ===
Balmain	Position	South Sydney
1. Hec Day	FB	16. Dick Johnson
2. Sid Goodwin (c)	WG	12. Harry Thompson
5. Jack Winchester	CE	11. Alan Quinlivan
3. Frank Hyde	CE	14. Fred Felsch (c)
17. Tom Bourke	WG	13. Alan Tuohey
7. Billy Bischoff	FE	10. Jack Kadwell
4. Jim Quealey	HB	20. Albert Webster
21. Dawson Buckley	PR	36. John Whitfield
9. George Watt	HK	4. George Kilham
6. Dave Manning	PR	1. Jack Walsh
12. Athol Smith	SR	2. Percy Fairall
11. Billy Johnson	SR	3. Johnny Brown
13. Jack Redman	LK	8. Eddie Hinson
Bill Kelly	Coach	Charlie Lynch

The decider was played on the weekend when the world’s future altered dramatically with the invasion of Poland by Germany leading to England, Australia and the world going to war.

The match was played at the Sydney Cricket Ground and refereed by George Bishop in front of 26,972. The game was tight in the first half with the Tigers scoring one try to lead 7–2 at the break.

In the second-half Balmain ran away with it, scoring six further tries to South Sydney’s none for a crushing seventh premiership title and the Tigers’ first since 1924. Star Balmain players of the time included Sid Goodwin, Frank Hyde, Tom Bourke, Athol Smith, Billy Bischoff, George Watt and Jim Quealey.

Balmain 33 (Tries: Tom Bourke 2, Frank Hyde, J. Redman, Jim Quealey, D. Buckley, A. Smith. Goals: H. Day 5, W. Johnson )

defeated

South Sydney 4 (Fred Felsch 2 goals)

Balmain Premiers 1939
