= 1941 NSWRFL season =

Rugby league competition

1941 New South Wales Rugby Football League
- Teams: 8
- Premiers: St. George (1st title)
- Minor premiers: Eastern Suburbs (10th title)
- Matches played: 59
- Points scored: 1933
- Top points scorer: Neville Smith (84)
- Wooden spoon: North Sydney (5th spoon)
- Top try-scorer(s): Percy Dermond (13); Sel Lisle (13)

The 1941 New South Wales Rugby Football League premiership was the thirty-fourth season of Sydney’s top-level rugby league competition, Australia’s first. Eight teams from across the city contested the premiership during the season, which lasted from April until August, culminating in Eastern Suburbs’ loss to St. George in the grand final.

== Teams ==
- Balmain, formed on January 23, 1908, at Balmain Town Hall
- Canterbury-Bankstown
- Eastern Suburbs, formed on January 24, 1908, at Paddington Town Hall
- Newtown, formed on January 14, 1908
- North Sydney, formed on February 7, 1908
- South Sydney, formed on January 17, 1908, at Redfern Town Hall
- St. George, formed on November 8, 1920, at Kogarah School of Arts
- Western Suburbs, formed on February 4, 1908

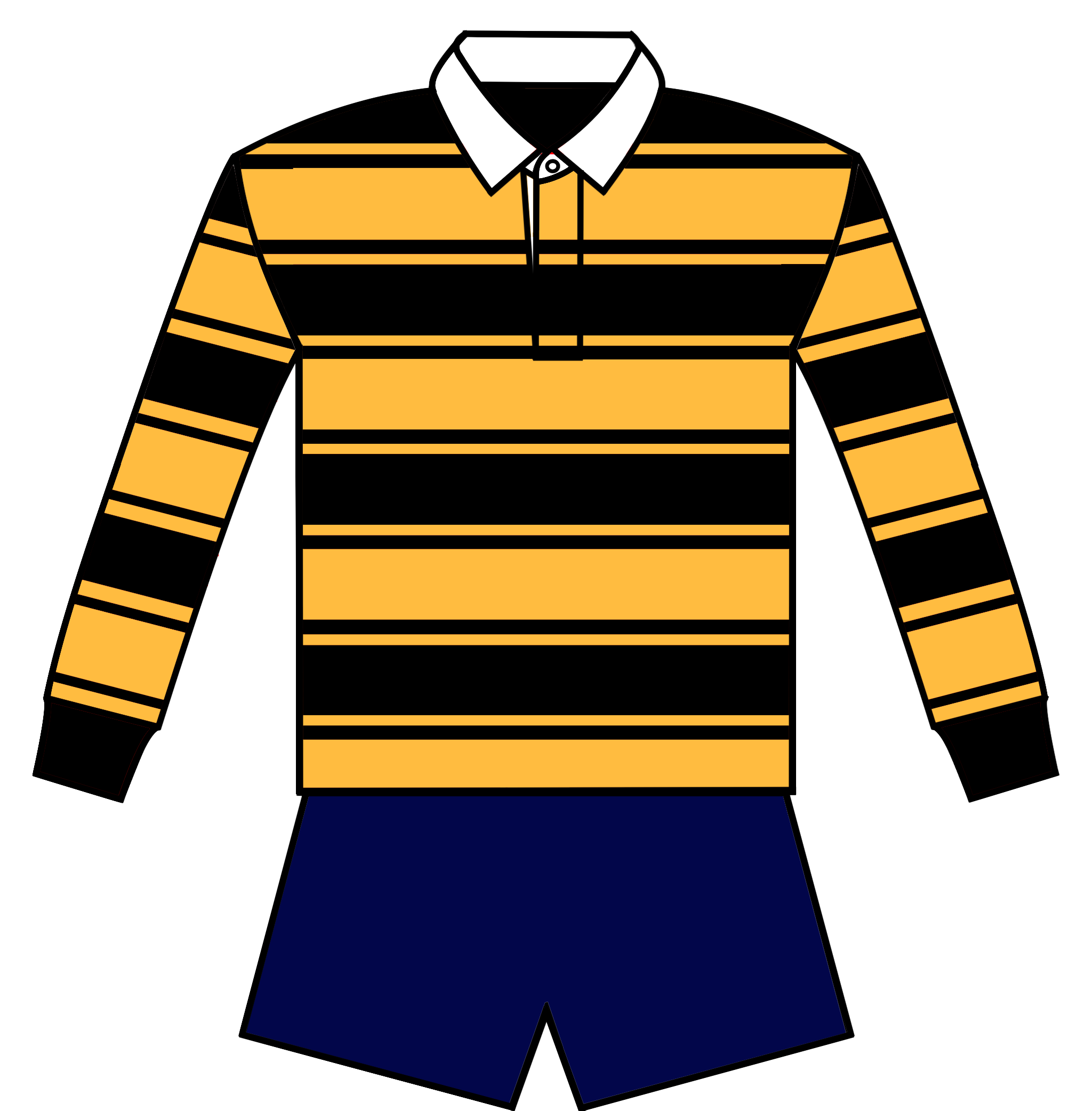
Balmain 34th season Ground: Leichhardt Oval; Coach: Bill Kelly; Captain: Sid Goodwin

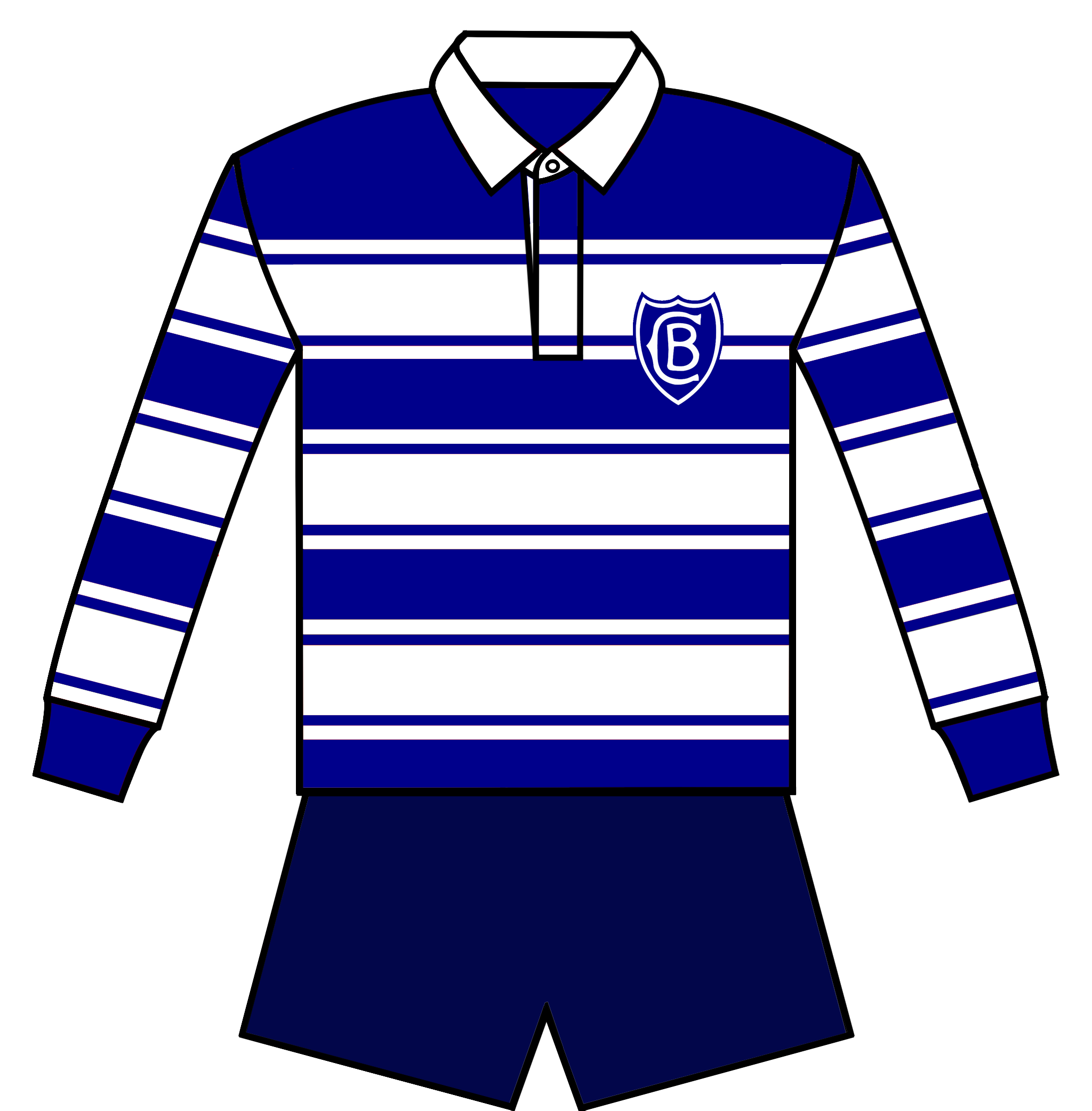
Canterbury-Bankstown 7th season Ground: Belmore Sports Ground; Captain-coach: Ron Bailey

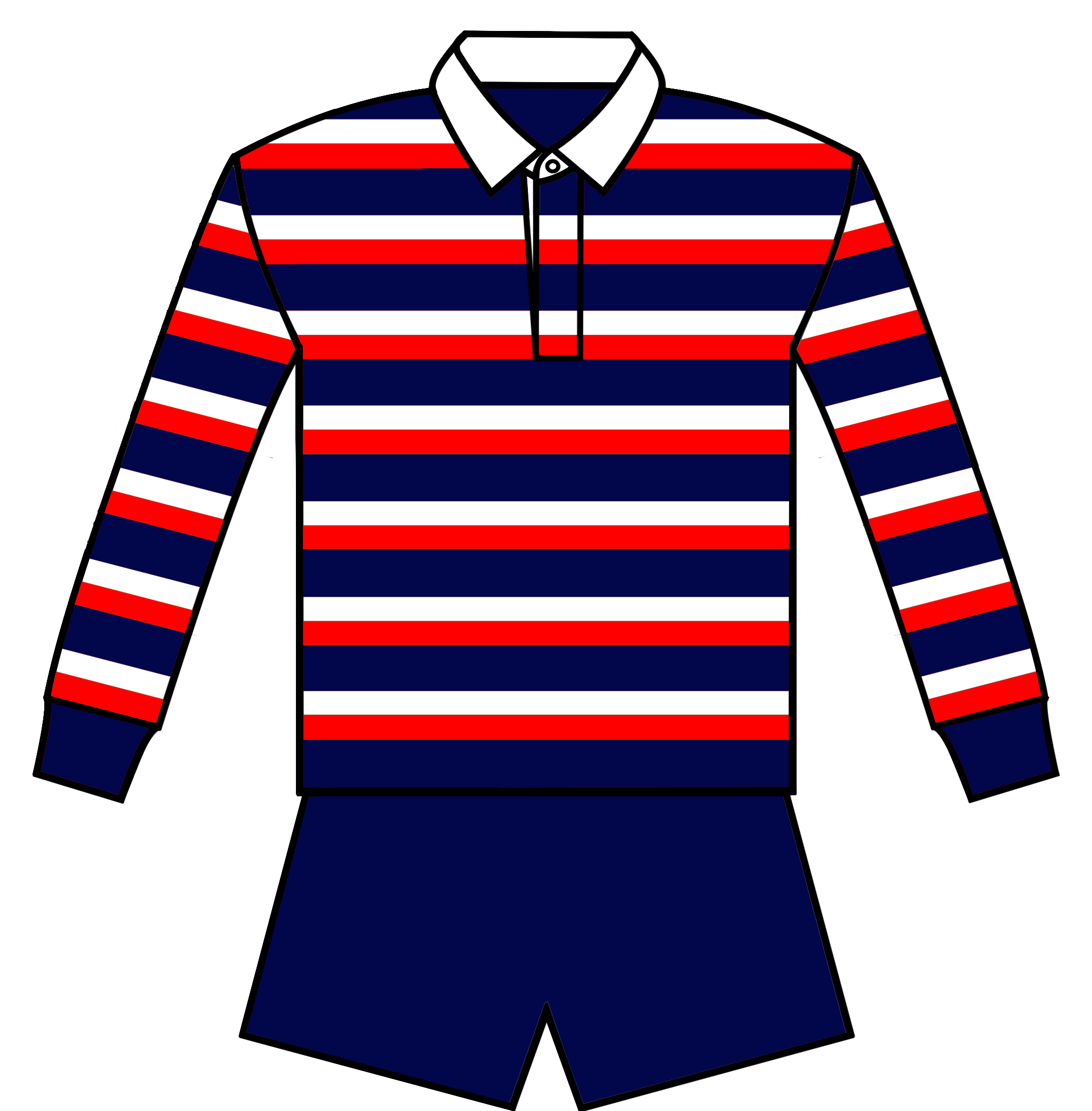
Eastern Suburbs 34th season Ground: Sydney Sports Ground; Captain-coach: Ray Stehr

Newtown 34th season Ground: Henson Park; Captain-Coach: Percy Williams

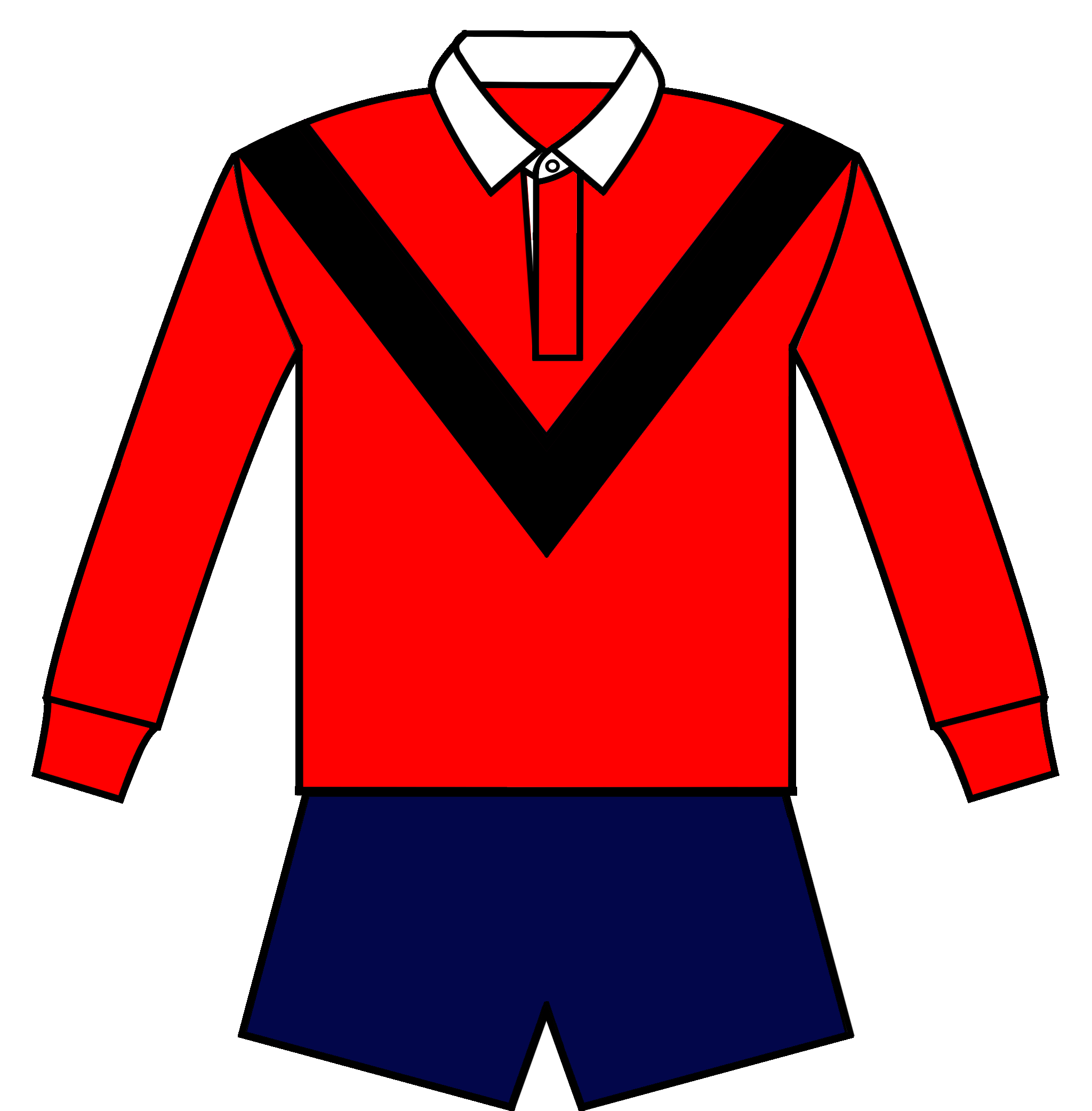
North Sydney 34th season Ground: North Sydney Oval; Coach: Arthur Halloway; Captain: Rex Harrison

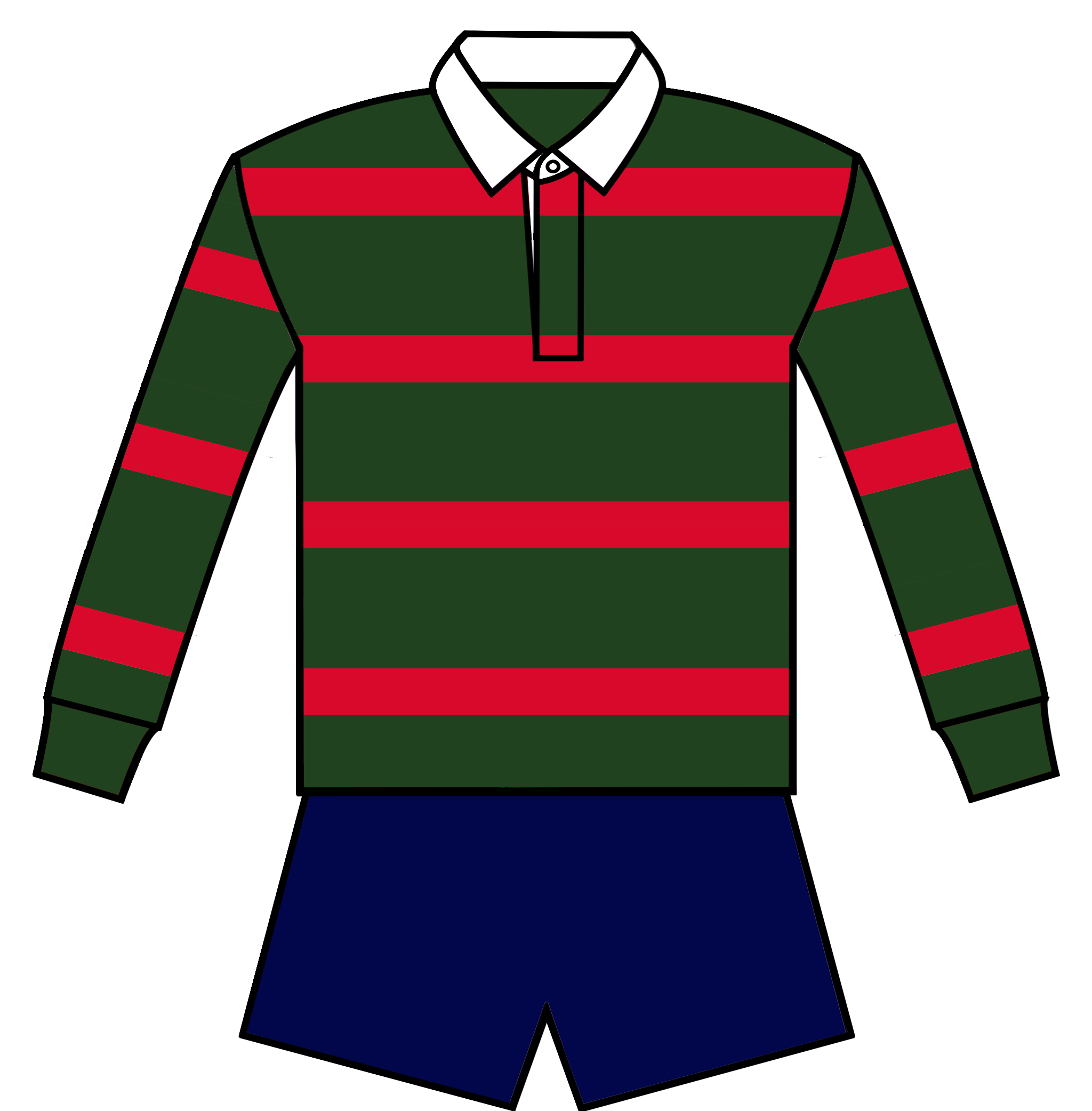
South Sydney 34th season Ground: Sydney Sports Ground; Coach: Jim Tait; Captain: Bob Banham

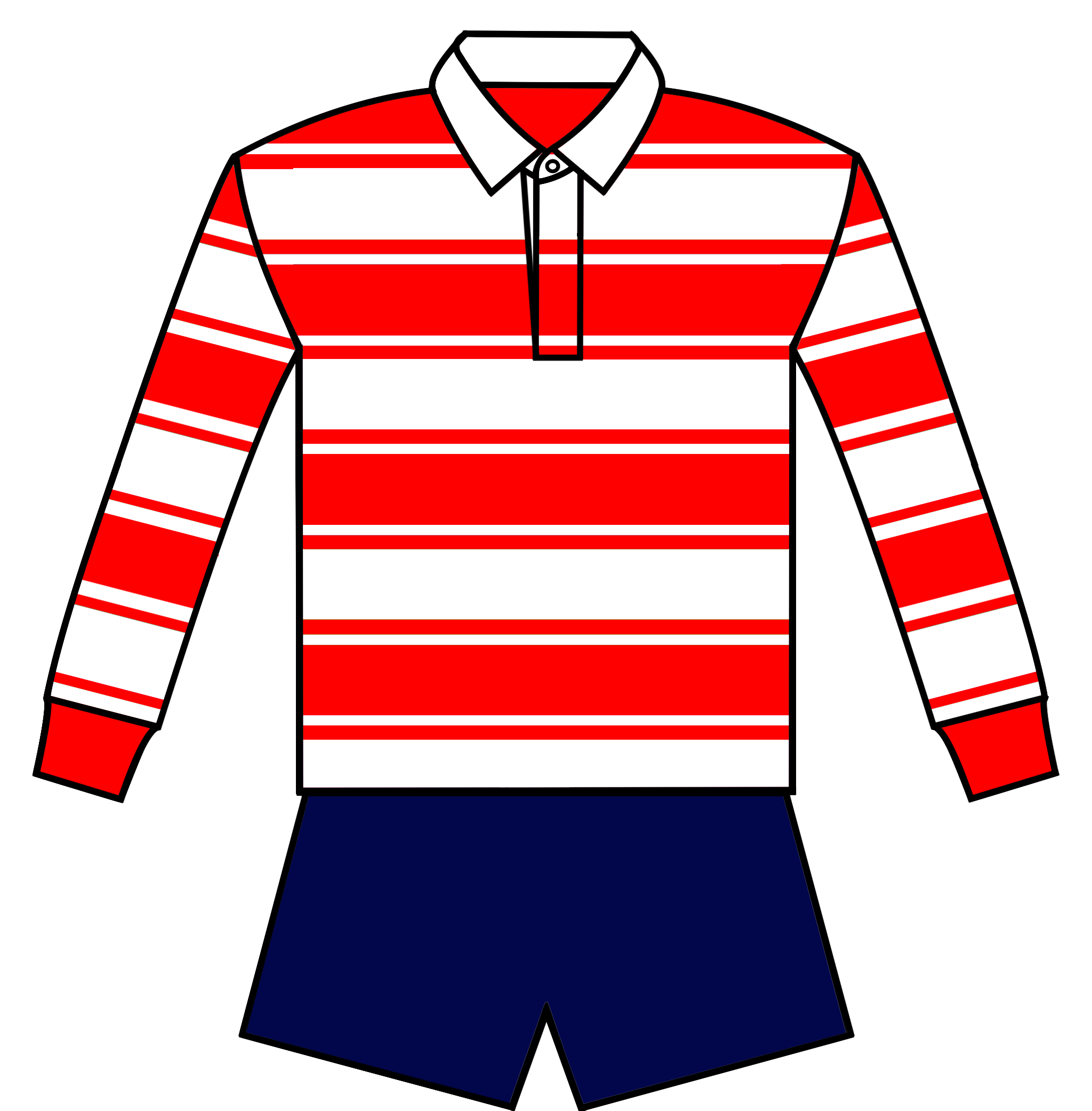
St. George 21st season Ground; Hurstville Oval; Captain-coach: Neville Smith

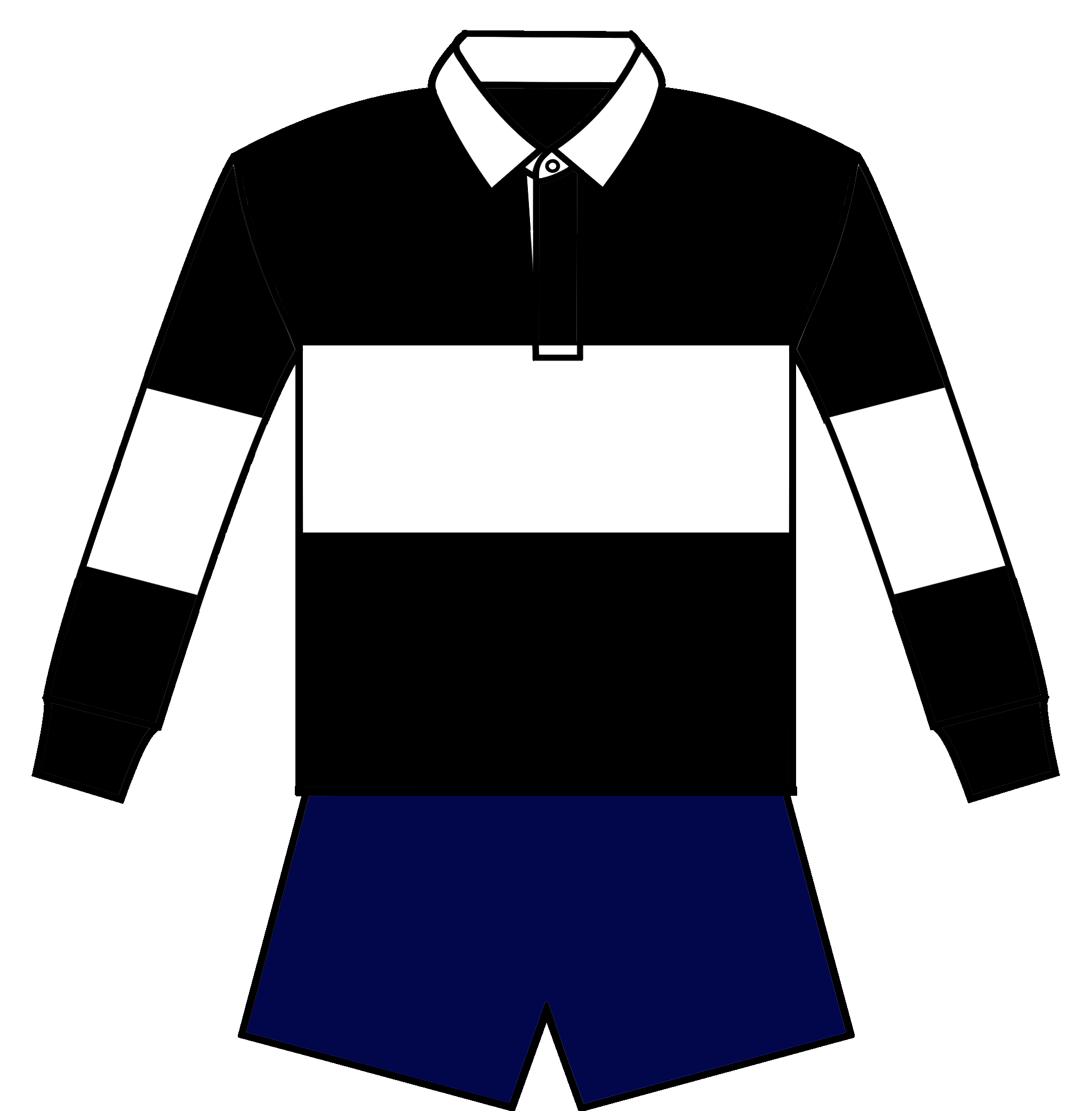
Western Suburbs 34th season Ground: Pratten Park; Captain-Coach: Les Mead

== Ladder ==
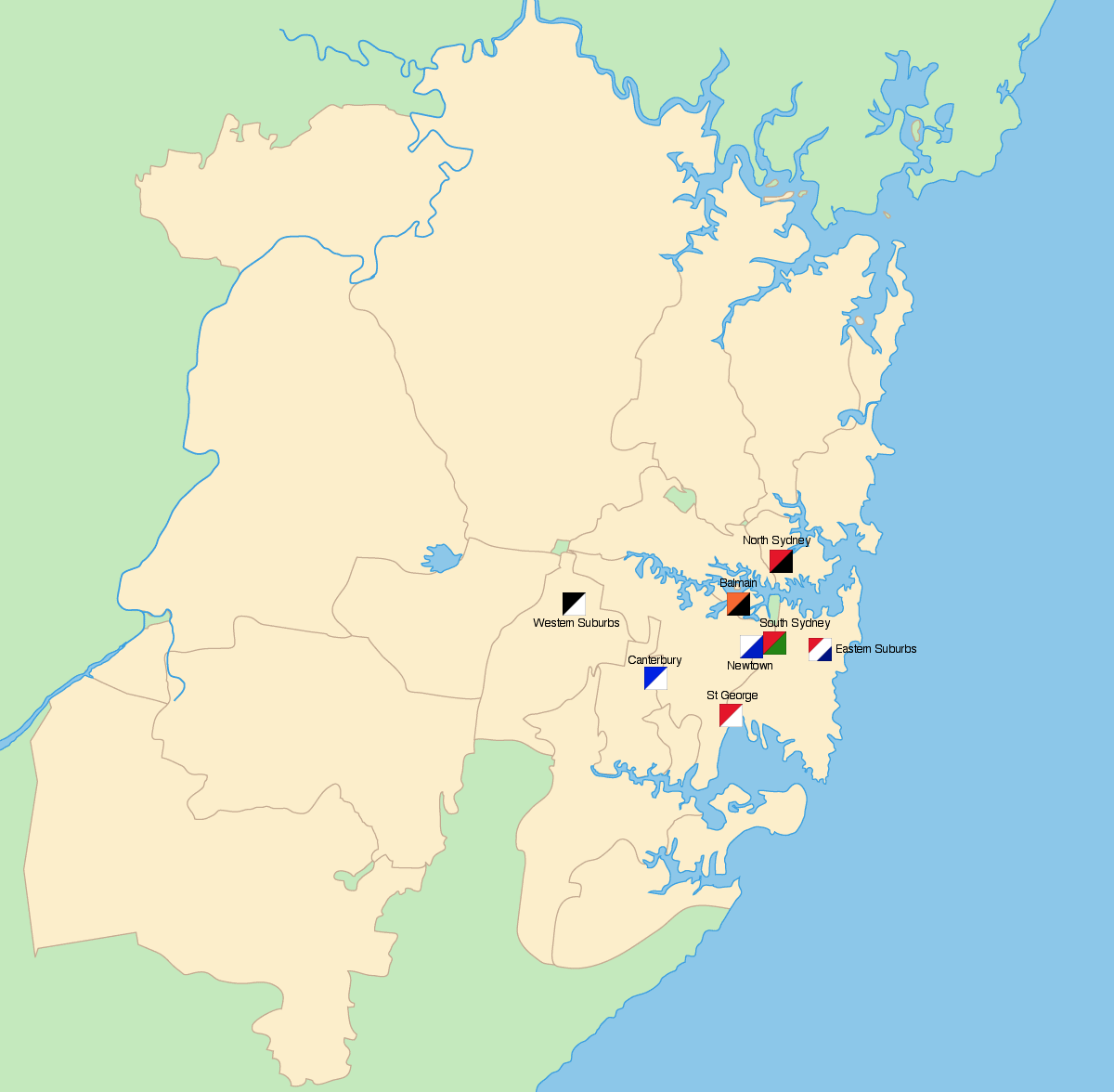
The geographical locations of the teams that contested the 1941 premiership across Sydney.

	Team	Pld	W	D	L	PF	PA	PD	Pts
1	Eastern Suburbs	14	9	0	5	217	160	+57	18
2	Balmain	14	9	0	5	243	205	+38	18
3	Canterbury	14	9	0	5	205	182	+23	18
4	St. George	14	8	1	5	307	248	+59	17
5	Newtown	14	6	2	6	219	242	-23	14
6	Western Suburbs	14	6	0	8	247	226	+21	12
7	South Sydney	14	4	0	10	193	277	-84	8
8	North Sydney	14	3	1	10	171	262	-91	7

As three clubs were equal on points at the end of the home-and-away season, no club had the right of challenge in the finals.

== Finals ==
Eastern Suburbs and St. George won their respective semi finals, allowing them to meet in the final.

Home	Score	Away	Match Information
Home	Score	Away	Date and Time	Venue	Referee	Crowd
Semifinals
Eastern Suburbs	24–22	Canterbury-Bankstown	16 August 1941	Sydney Cricket Ground	Tom McMahon	21,000
Balmain	8–32	St. George	23 August 1941	Sydney Cricket Ground	Tom McMahon	26,790
Final
Eastern Suburbs	14–31	St. George	30 August 1941	Sydney Cricket Ground	Tom McMahon	39,957

=== Premiership final ===
Eastern Suburbs	Position	St. George
13. Doug Bartlett	FB	13. Jack Wedgwood
44. Percy Dermond	WG	9. Owen Campbell
10. Dick Dunn	CE	8. Gordon Hart
14. Dave Brown	CE	49. Jack Gilbert
21. Brian Walsh	WG	12. Noel Jones
8. Fred May	FE	20. Roy Hasson
7. Sel Lisle	HB	7. Albert McAndrew
3. Jack Arnold	PR	3. Charlie Montgomery
2. Noel Hollingdale	HK	1. Herb Gilbert Jnr
1. Ray Stehr (Ca./Co.)	PR	2. Lindsay Spencer
30. Don Gulliver	SR	5. Neville Smith (Ca./Co.)
5. Sid Pearce	SR	6. Len Kelly (v.capt)
27. Wal Bamford	LK	23. Bill Tyquin
	Reserve	47. Bill Collier
	Reserve	58. Jim Hale

In a tough encounter the Dragons won their first ever premiership in their twenty-first season in the competition. St. George captain-coach Neville Smith was knocked out after a heavy tackle early in the match. Smith recovered and scored 13 points through one try and five goals.

Along with Smith, St. George centre Gordon Hart also gave a sparkling display of free-running rugby league. Recently enlisted in the AIF, Hart had been given permission to leave barracks to participate in the finals.

In another incident Easts’ prop Jack Arnold and Saints’ lock Bill Tyquin were sent off after an almighty punch up. Tyquin, a Queensland representative who would later captain Australia, played only the 1941 war-time season in Sydney while he was stationed there on duty with the AIF.

It was to prove to be the final match in the record-setting career of Easts’ Dave Brown who at twenty-nine years of age announced his retirement at game’s end.

St. George 31 (Tries: Campbell 2, Hanson 2, Smith, Kelly, Hart. Goals: Smith 5)

defeated

Eastern Suburbs 14 (Tries: Dermond 2, Brown, Bamford. Goals: Brown 1)

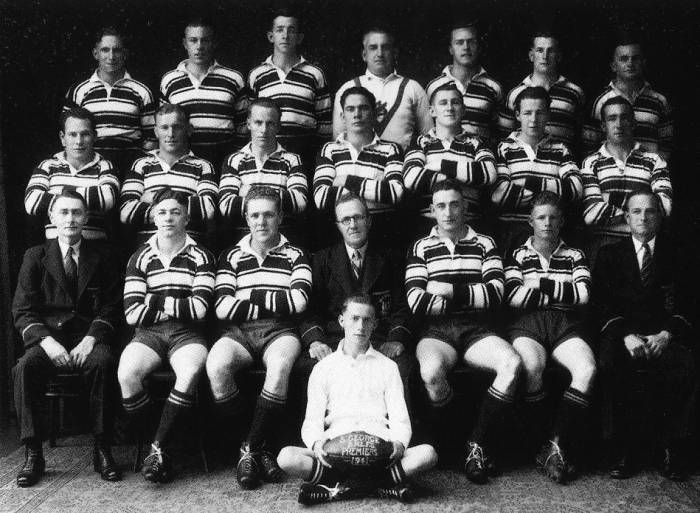
St. George's 1941 Premiership-winning team.

== Player statistics ==
The following statistics are as of the conclusion of Round 14.

Top 5 point scorers

Points	Player	Tries	Goals	Field Goals
68	Lin Johnson	0	34	0
62	N. Parkinson	6	22	0
58	Ray Pratt	0	29	0
57	Neville Smith	7	18	0
54	Fred Felsch	2	24	0

Top 5 try scorers

Tries	Player
13	Sel Lisle
12	Arthur Patton
11	William Ryan
10	Sid Goodwin
10	Jack Lindwall
10	Bruce Ryan
10	Bruce Brown

Top 5 goal scorers

Goals	Player
34	Lin Johnson
29	Ray Pratt
26	Percy Williams
24	Fred Felsch
22	N. Parkinson
