= Albert Webster =

Albert Webster may refer to:

- Albert Webster (athlete) (1925–2010), British Olympic athlete
- Albert Webster (rugby league) (1920–2014), Australian rugby player
- Albert Falvey Webster (1848–1876), American author
