= Noel Jones (rugby league) =

Australian rugby league player

- Noel Jones 1941

Personal information
- Full name: Noel Ernest Jones
- Born: 9 October 1919 Sydney, New South Wales, Australia
- Died: 1 June 1986 (aged 66) Penshurst, New South Wales, Australia

Playing information
- Position: Centre
Club
Years	Team	Pld	T	G	FG	P
1940–47	St. George	60	24	4	0	80

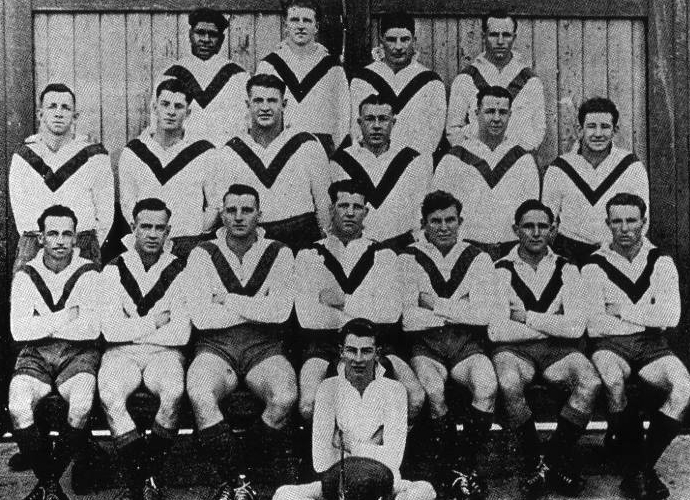
Jones (middle, 3rd from right) in St George's 1946 side

Noel Ernest Jones (1919–1986) was an Australian World War II veteran and premiership winning rugby league footballer who played in the 1940s.

== Playing career ==
Jones played five seasons for St George between 1940 and 1947 in a career interrupted by World War II. He played as a wing and centre for St. George and made two Grand Final appearances - a win in the 1941 season and a loss in the 1946 decider to Balmain in which he scored a try.

He joined the AIF in 1943, saw action as a Gunner and post-war rejoined the Dragons for two seasons. He retired at the conclusion of the 1947 season.

== Death ==
Jones died on 1 June 1986, aged 66.

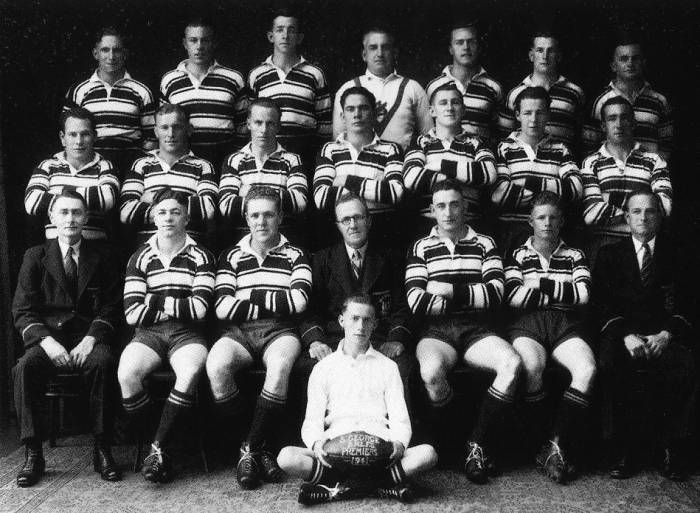
Jones (back 2nd from left) in St. George's 1941 premiership-winning team.

== Published sources ==
- Whiticker, Alan & Hudson, Glen (2006) The Encyclopedia of Rugby League Players, Gavin Allen Publishing, Sydney
- Haddan, Steve (2007) The Finals - 100 Years of National Rugby League Finals, Steve Haddan Publishing, Brisbane
