= Herb Gilbert =

Australian rugby union footballer and rugby league footballer, coach and administrator

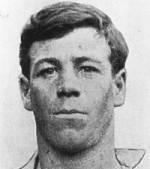

Personal information
- Born: Herbert Richmond Gilbert; 18 September 1887 Gulgong, New South Wales
- Died: 2 January 1972 (aged 84) Bexley, New South Wales

Playing information
- Height: 182 cm (6 ft 0 in)
- Weight: 13 st 7 lb (86 kg)

Rugby union
- Position: wing, Centre
Club
Years	Team	Pld	T	G	FG	P
	South Sydney RU Club
Representative
Years	Team	Pld	T	G	FG	P
1910	Wallabies	3				9
1910	New South Wales

Rugby league
- Position: Centre
Club
Years	Team	Pld	T	G	FG	P
1911–12	South Sydney	23	0	0	0	24
1912–15	Hull FC	0	0	0	0	0
1915	South Sydney	0	0	0	0	0
1916	Eastern Suburbs	14	0	0	0	18
1917–20	Western Suburbs	50	0	0	0	69
1921	St George	8	1	0	0	3
	Total	95	1	0	0	114
Representative
Years	Team	Pld	T	G	FG	P
1911–20	New South Wales	8				9
1911–20	Australia	7				8

Coaching information
Club
Years	Team	Gms	W	D	L	W%
1921–24	St George	48	12	2	34	25
- As of 10 April 2021
- Occupation: Railways
- Children: Herb Gilbert, Jack Gilbert, Bob Gilbert
- Relatives: Sam Gilbert (great grandson); Larry Davidson (great grandson)

Herbert R. Gilbert (18 September 1888 – 5 January 1972) was an Australian rugby league and rugby union player – a dual-code international. He represented the Wallabies in three Tests in 1910 and the Kangaroos in seven Tests from 1911 to 1920, his last two as captain. The captain-coach of the St. George Dragons club in Sydney in their inaugural season, he is considered one of Australia's finest footballers of the 20th century. His sons, Herb Gilbert, Jr, Bob Gilbert and Jack Gilbert were also notable rugby league footballers.

== Rugby union career ==
Gilbert was born in Gulgong, New South Wales and moved to Sydney, playing rugby union in the South Sydney district. Tall and powerful for his era, Gilbert stood at 6 ft (182 cm), weighed 13 st 7 lb (86 kg), and reputedly played his best football in the biggest games. Gilbert learnt his rugby in the South Sydney district and went into the NSW and Australian teams in 1910 after Dally Messenger defected to league. The pro-rugby union press boasted that Gilbert was a greater asset to the union than Dally Messenger had ever been.

He was first selected for New South Wales in 1910 against Queensland and then the New Zealand Māori. That same year he made his Wallaby Test début playing in the three Test series against the All Blacks in 1910. The series was played over only eight days at the Sydney Cricket Ground and won by the All Blacks by two games to one. Gilbert scored two tries in the second Test and another in the third.

Gilbert right with Devereux & Darmody in Hull 1914

== Rugby league career ==
=== South Sydney ===
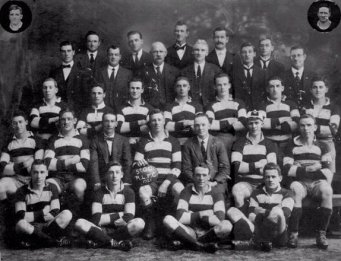
Gilbert (c) of inaugural St. George side of 1921

Later in the same year he'd made his rugby union representative debut, he crossed over to the professional code, joining the South Sydney Club in 1910 as their first grade player number 42. He represented for New South Wales in 1911 and was chosen for the 1911–12 Kangaroo tour of Great Britain. Gilbert made his international league début in the first Test at Newcastle in November 1911, becoming the 16th ever Australian dual code international. He played in all three Tests on tour, heading the tour's try-scoring list with 20 tries.

=== Hull FC ===
From 1912 to 1915 he played in England for Hull FC, where he played at centre, wearing number 4, and was captain in Hull FC's 6–0 victory over Wakefield Trinity in the 1914 Challenge Cup Final during the 1913–14 season at Thrum Hall, Halifax, played in front of a crowd of 19,000.

=== South Sydney (rejoin) ===
After the outbreak of World War I, the three-quarter returned to Australia, where he rejoined South Sydney. In 1916, Gilbert joined Eastern Suburbs. He was a member of that club's City Cup winning side before joining the Western Suburbs Magpies in 1917. He played with them until 1920, helping to mould them from a struggling side to a competitive outfit.

=== St George ===
In 1921 aged 33, Gilbert signed on as foundation captain-coach of the newly formed St. George club. He retired as a player at the end of that season but coached the club until 1924.

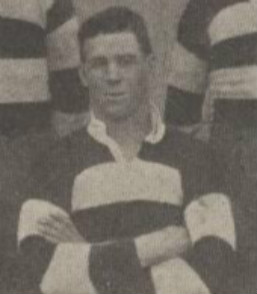
St.George foundation captain-coach 1921

=== International ===
Gilbert returned to the Australian Test team as captain in the 2nd Test of the Lions' 1920 tour of Australia. All four of Australia's illustrious three-quarter line of Dick Vest, Harold Horder, Viv Farnsworth and Gilbert scored tries in Australia's 21–8 victory. With the Ashes already won, Australia lost to Great Britain in the 3rd Test of the series with Gilbert captaining his country for his second and final time.

== Post playing and accolades ==
Gilbert was awarded Life Membership of the St. George Dragons club in 1938. He was a state and national selector from 1925 to 1937; his working career was with the New South Wales Railways; in his later years he was doorman at the Sydney Cricket Ground. Herb died in 1972, aged 83.

In 2004 he was named by Souths in their South Sydney Dream Team, consisting of 17 players and a coach representing the club from 1908 through to 2004. In February 2008, Gilbert was named in the list of Australia's 100 Greatest Players (1908–2007) which was commissioned by the NRL and ARL to celebrate the code's centenary year in Australia.

== Progeny ==
Three of Gilbert's sons all played for St. George with Herb Junior and Jack playing in the Dragons' maiden Grand Final victory in 1941. Another son, Bob also played with the St. George Dragons in first grade in 1945. Two great grandsons were professional sportsmen – Sam Gilbert played AFL with St Kilda and Larry Davidson, was a basketballer who played in the NBL for the Wollongong Hawks.

== Playing record ==
- Club: Souths(1911–12 & 1915) 23 games, 6 tries, 3 goals; Hull FC, England 1912–1915; Easts (1916) 14 games, 6 tries; Wests (1917–1920) 50 games, 23 tries; St George (1921) 8 games, 1 try.
- Representative: Australia (1911–12 & 1919–1920) 7 Tests, and New South Wales (1911–20) 8 appearances.

== Sources ==
- Whiticker, Alan (2004) Captaining the Kangaroos, New Holland, Sydney

Sporting positions
Preceded by Albert Johnston	Captain Australia; 1920	Succeeded by Chook Fraser
