= Albert McAndrew =

Australian rugby league footballer

Personal information
- Full name: Albert Walker McAndrew
- Born: 29 November 1920 Woodburn, New South Wales, Australia
- Died: 9 December 2009 (aged 89) Beverley Park, New South Wales, Australia

Playing information
- Position: Halfback
Club
Years	Team	Pld	T	G	FG	P
1938–45	St. George	69	17	0	0	51
Representative
Years	Team	Pld	T	G	FG	P
1940	New South Wales	2	1	0	0	3
1940–43	NSW City	2	0	0	0	0

Albert Walker McAndrew (1920–2009) was an Australian rugby league player who played in the 1930s and 1940s. He was a state representative half-back who won the 1941 premiership with St George.

== Playing career ==
"Albie" McAndrew was still seventeen when he debuted in first-grade for St George in 1938. He played eight seasons with St George between 1938 and 1945.

He was a member of the first St. George side to win a premiership in 1941. He represented New South Wales in 1940, and played for NSW City Firsts in 1940 and 1943.

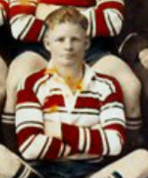
Albie McAndrew 1941

His representative career was interrupted by World War II when, in 1942, he enlisted in the 54th Australian Anti-Aircraft Regiment with the rank Bombardier.

== Death ==
McAndrew died on 9 December 2009, aged 89.

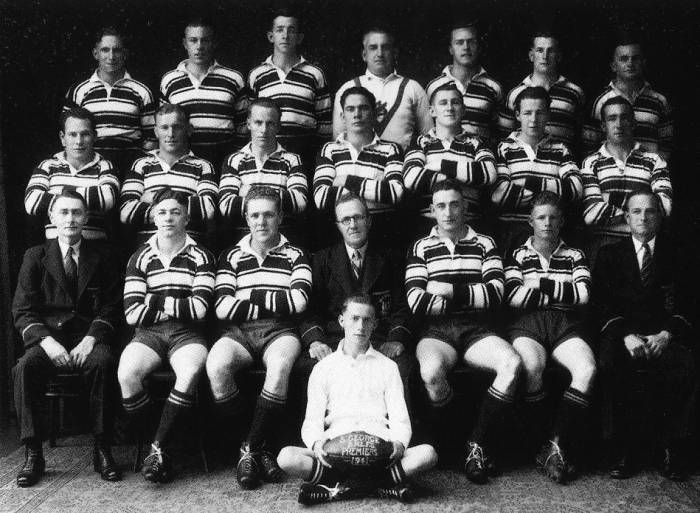
McAndrew (seated 2nd from right) in St. George's 1941 premiership-winning team.

== Published sources ==
- Whiticker, Alan & Hudson, Glen (2006) The Encyclopedia of Rugby League Players, Gavin Allen Publishing, Sydney
- Haddan, Steve (2007) The Finals - 100 Years of National Rugby League Finals, Steve Haddan Publishing, Brisbane
