= Neville Smith (rugby league) =

Australian RL coach and former rugby league footballer

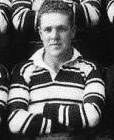
- Captain-coach at 23yrs old

Personal information
- Full name: Neville Bussey Smith
- Born: 13 December 1915 Orange, New South Wales, Australia
- Died: 5 August 1997 (aged 81) Allawah, New South Wales, Australia

Playing information
- Position: Second-row
Club
Years	Team	Pld	T	G	FG	P
1936–38	Fortitude Valley
1939–43	St George	59	15	118		281
	Total	59	15	118	0	281
Representative
Years	Team	Pld	T	G	FG	P
1938	Queensland	1	0	0	0	0
1940–41	New South Wales	6	6	9	0	36

Coaching information
Club
Years	Team	Gms	W	D	L	W%
1939–43	St George	68	39	4	25	57

Neville Bussey Smith (13 December 1915 – 5 August 1997) was an Australian rugby league footballer who played in the 1930s and 1940s. A Queensland state representative, Smith became a premiership winning captain-coach with Sydney's St. George club. In seasons 1939 & 1941 he was the NSWRFL premiership's top point scorer.

== Career ==
After moving from Bathurst to Queensland in 1935, Smith played club football in the Brisbane Rugby League premiership for three seasons with Fortitude Valley and represented for the Maroons on two occasions in 1938. In 1939 he returned south to play in the New South Wales Rugby Football League premiership with the St. George club and was the league's top point-scorer that season.

Smith was first selected to representative honours in the New South Wales rugby league team in 1940 as captain and made six appearances in 1940 & 41. National representative sides did not play during WWII and Smith never represented his country.

At St George in 1939 aged just 23, Neville Smith was appointed the youngest captain-coach in the club's history and in 1941 he led the club to its inaugural premiership. In the Grand Final he was knocked unconscious in a heavy tackle but recovered to score 13 points (1 try and 5 goals). That season, he was again the league's highest point scorer. After winning the 1941 premiership as captain-coach of St. George Dragons, he sat out the 1942 season. Smith returned for a final year as captain-coach of St. George in the 1943 NSWRFL season. He played 59 first grade games for St. George Dragons during his time at the club, and scored a total of 281 points.

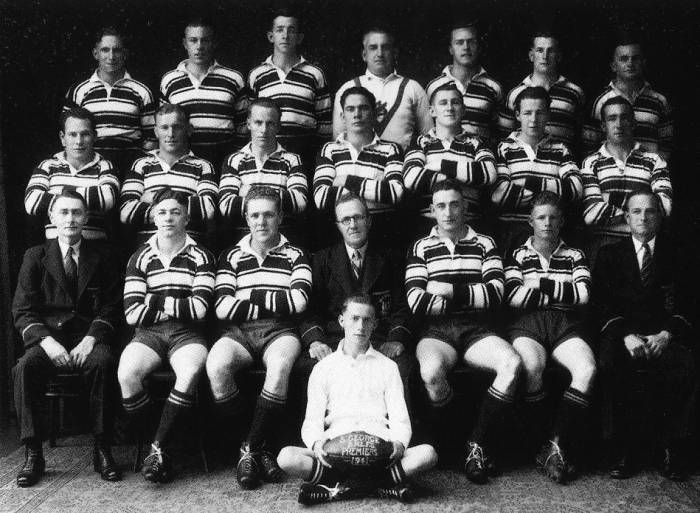
Neville Smith (seated 3rd from left) in St. George's 1941 premiership-winning team

== Accolades ==
On 20 July 2022, Smith was named in the St. George Dragons District Rugby League Clubs team of the century.

== Published sources ==
- Whiticker, Alan & Hudson, Glen (2006) The Encyclopedia of Rugby League Players, Gavin Allen Publishing, Sydney
- Haddan, Steve (2007) The Finals – 100 Years of National Rugby League Finals, Steve Haddan Publishing, Brisbane
