= Owen Campbell (rugby league) =

Australian rugby league footballer

- Owen Campbell. St.George 1941

Personal information
- Full name: Owen Belmont Campbell
- Born: 18 January 1918 Tingha, New South Wales, Australia
- Died: 7 August 1993 (aged 75) Caringbah, New South Wales, Australia

Playing information
- Position: Wing
Club
Years	Team	Pld	T	G	FG	P
1938	Newtown	7	1	0	0	3
1940	Eastern Suburbs	3	0	0	0	0
1941–45	St. George	56	26	0	0	78
	Total	66	27	0	0	81
Representative
Years	Team	Pld	T	G	FG	P
1937	NSW Country	1	0	0	0	0

Owen Belmont Campbell (18 January 1918 – 7 August 1993) was an Australian rugby league footballer who played in the 1930s and 1940s. He was a winger who played with three different Sydney clubs during his career and won the 1941 premiership with St George.

== Playing career ==
'Ossie' Campbell featured in seven NSWRFL seasons. Originally from Maitland, New South Wales, he started his career at Newtown in 1938, then moved to Eastern Suburbs for one season in 1940 and then moved to St George for five seasons between 1941 and 1945. He won a premiership when he scored two tries for St George in 1941 Grand Final. He retired at the end of 1945.

Campbell died on 7 August 1993, aged 75.

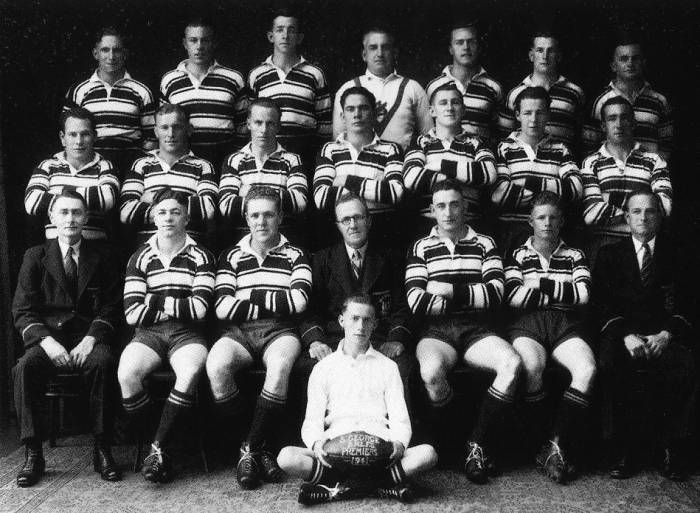
Owen Campbell (middle left) in St. George's 1941 premiership-winning team.

== Published sources ==
- Whiticker, Alan & Hudson, Glen (2006) The Encyclopedia of Rugby League Players, Gavin Allen Publishing, Sydney
- Haddan, Steve (2007) The Finals – 100 Years of National Rugby League Finals, Steve Haddan Publishing, Brisbane
