= Jack Gilbert (rugby league) =

Australian rugby league footballer

- Jack Gilbert. 1941 St.George

Personal information
- Full name: John Francis Gilbert
- Born: 20 November 1918; Sydney, New South Wales, Australia
- Died: 29 November 1998 (aged 80); Sydney, New South Wales, Australia

Playing information
- Position: Centre
Club
Years	Team	Pld	T	G	FG	P
1941–46	St. George	8	0	2	0	4
Representative
Years	Team	Pld	T	G	FG	P
1948	NSW Country	1	0	0	0	0
- Father: Herb Gilbert
- Relatives: Herb Gilbert Jr. (brother); Bob Gilbert (brother); Sam Gilbert (grandson); Larry Davidson (grandson)

John Francis Gilbert (20 November 1918 – 29 November 1998) was an Australian premiership winning rugby league footballer who played in the 1940s.

== Background ==
Jack and his brothers: Herb Gilbert, Jr. and Bob Gilbert were sons of the pioneer rugby league champion footballer, Herb Gilbert. The brothers grew up in Bexley, New South Wales and came through the St George junior ranks.

== Playing career ==
Gilbert's career was curtailed by World War II and he only played two full first grade seasons with St. George in 1941 and 1946. Gilbert won a premiership with St. George, playing centre in the team that defeated Eastern Suburbs in the 1941 Grand Final. At season's end Gilbert was posted to New Guinea to see active service with the Australian Army.

He survived the war, and after his discharge in April 1946, Gilbert resumed his playing career at St. George for the 1946 season, before retiring from Sydney first grade football. His grandson, Sam Gilbert is an AFL footballer for the St Kilda club.

== Death ==
Gilbert died on 29 November 1998, and was cremated at Woronora Cemetery, Sutherland, New South Wales.

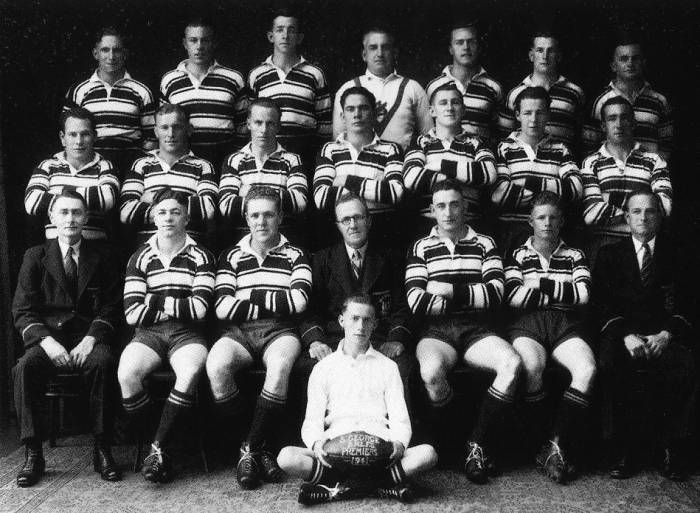
Gilbert (middle 2nd from right) in St. George's 1941 premiership-winning team.

== Published sources ==
- Whiticker, Alan & Hudson, Glen (2006) The Encyclopedia of Rugby League Players, Gavin Allen Publishing, Sydney
- Haddan, Steve (2007) The Finals - 100 Years of National Rugby League Finals, Steve Haddan Publishing, Brisbane
