= Gordon Hart =

Australian rugby league footballer

- Gordon Hart. 1941

Personal information
- Full name: Gordon Charles Hart
- Born: 17 March 1919 St Peters, New South Wales, Australia
- Died: 16 April 2009 (aged 90) Sydney, New South Wales, Australia

Playing information
- Position: Centre
Club
Years	Team	Pld	T	G	FG	P
1938–41	St. George	43	16	0	0	48
Representative
Years	Team	Pld	T	G	FG	P
1940	New South Wales	1	0	0	0	0
1940	NSW City	1	0	0	0	0
- Military career
- Allegiance: Australia
- Branch: Australian Army
- Service years: 1941–1945
- Rank: Captain
- Unit: 2/4th Commando Squadron
- Conflicts: World War II; Battle of Timor
- Awards: Mentioned in dispatches

Gordon Charles Hart (17 March 1919 – 16 April 2009) was an Australian World War II veteran and rugby league player who played in the 1930s and 1940s. He was a state representative centre who won the 1941 premiership with St George.

== Military career ==
Born at St Peters, New South Wales in 1919, Hart enlisted in the Australian Army Australian Army in August 1941. He attained the rank of Captain of the 2/4th Commando Squadron and was mentioned in dispatches for 'conspicuous bravery' during fighting on the island of Timor. He survived the war and was discharged in November 1945.

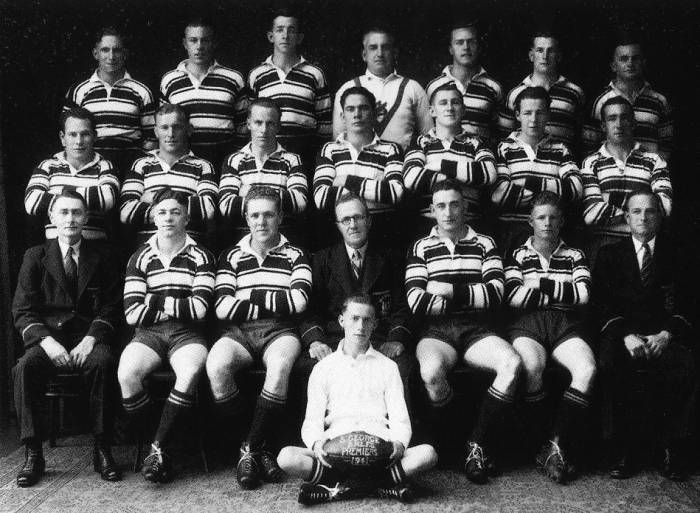
Gordon Hart (back far right) in St. George's 1941 premiership-winning team.

== Rugby League career ==
Hart played for St George for four seasons between 1938 and 1941 as a centre. Hart represented for New South Wales for one match in 1940.

After enlistment and before being posted for active service, he was given permission to leave camp to play in the 1941 Grand Final for St George. He traveled 28 hours from his Army Camp in Victoria to arrive in Sydney at 10am on the morning of the match. He scored a try and Haddan writes that Hart was "the Dragons' best back". He returned to base on the 8pm train that night.

Hart died on 16 April 2009, aged 90.

== Published sources ==
- Whiticker, Alan & Hudson, Glen (2006) The Encyclopedia of Rugby League Players, Gavin Allen Publishing, Sydney
- Haddan, Steve (2007) The Finals – 100 Years of National Rugby League Finals, Steve Haddan Publishing, Brisbane
