= Jack Wedgwood =

Australian rugby league footballer

- Jack Wedgwood. St.George 1941

Personal information
- Full name: John Edwin Wedgwood
- Born: 28 August 1916 Barmedman, New South Wales, Australia
- Died: 23 December 1992 (aged 76) Redhead, New South Wales, Australia

Playing information
- Position: Fullback
Club
Years	Team	Pld	T	G	FG	P
1937–41	St. George	53	2	10	0	26
Representative
Years	Team	Pld	T	G	FG	P
1940 & 1946	New South Wales	5	0	0	0	0
1940	NSW City	1	0	0	0	0
1946	NSW Country	1	0	1	0	2

John Edwin Wedgwood (1916–1992) was an Australian World War II air-officer and rugby league player who played in the 1930s and 1940s. He was a state representative fullback who won the 1941 premiership with the St George Dragons.

== Background ==
Wedgwood was born in Barmedman, New South Wales.

== Playing career and War service ==
Wedgwood played three first grade seasons with St George between 1939 and 1941. He won a premiership with the Dragons when he played fullback in their 1941 Grand Final victory over Eastern Suburbs.

He represented New South Wales in 1940 and again in 1946 while playing at Dorrigo, New South Wales.

Wedgwood's career was curtailed by World War II, seeing active service as a warrant officer in 12 squadron in the RAAF between 1941 and 1946.

Wedgwood died at Redhead, New South Wales on 23 December 1992 aged 76.

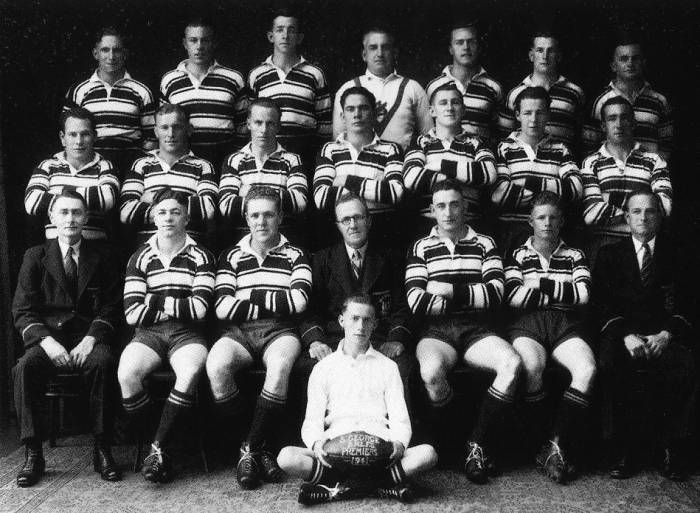
Jack Wedgwood (back 2nd from right) in St. George's 1941 premiership-winning team.

== Published sources ==
- Whiticker, Alan & Hudson, Glen (2006) The Encyclopedia of Rugby League Players, Gavin Allen Publishing, Sydney
- Haddan, Steve (2007) The Finals – 100 Years of National Rugby League Finals, Steve Haddan Publishing, Brisbane
