= Herb Gilbert Jr. =

Australian rugby league footballer

- Herb Gilbert 1941

Personal information
- Full name: Herbert Michael Gilbert
- Born: 4 May 1917 Kogarah, New South Wales, Australia
- Died: 31 October 1983 (aged 66) Bexley North, New South Wales, Australia

Playing information
- Position: Hooker
Club
| Years | Team | Pld | T | G | FG | P |
|---|---|---|---|---|---|---|
| 1938–43 | St. George | 89 | 12 | 2 | 0 | 40 |
| 1946–48 | Balmain | 45 | 0 | 2 | 0 | 4 |
| | Total | 134 | 12 | 4 | 0 | 44 |
Representative
| Years | Team | Pld | T | G | FG | P |
| 1940–46 | New South Wales | 8 | 2 | 0 | 0 | 6 |
| 1942–43 | City NSW | 2 | 0 | 0 | 0 | 0 |
- Father: Herb Gilbert
- Relatives: Bob Gilbert (brother); Jack Gilbert (brother)
- Military career
- Allegiance: Australia
- Branch: Australian Army
- Service years: 1942-1945
- Unit: Second Australian Imperial Force
- Conflicts: World War II

Herbert Michael Gilbert (4 May 1917 – 31 October 1983) was a three-time premiership winning and state representative Australian rugby league footballer who played in the 1930s and 1940s. A hooker who played with the St. George and Balmain clubs, he won premierships and made state representative appearances, both before and after active service in World War II.

== Early years ==
Son of Kangaroo great Herb Gilbert, Herb Gilbert Jr started playing first grade in the New South Wales Rugby Football League premiership with the St. George club in 1938. In 1940 he began representative playing duties for New South Wales appearing in games III and IV in Brisbane of that year's series against Queensland.

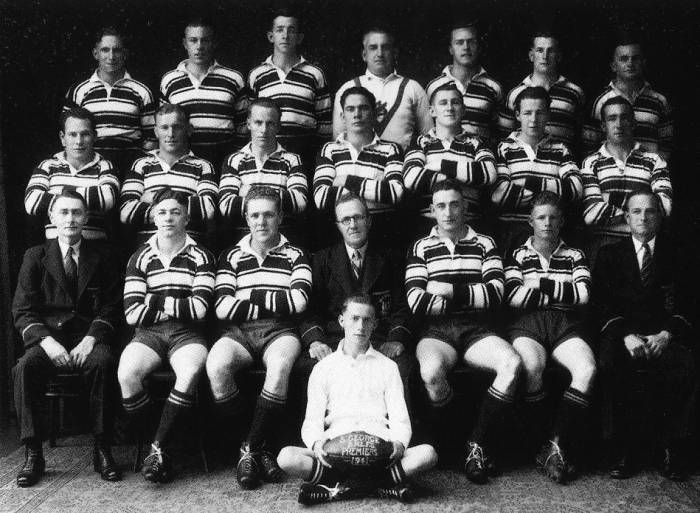
Gilbert (middle far right) in St. George's 1941 premiership-winning team

Gilbert played alongside his brother Jack in the St. George Dragons 1941 Grand Final winning team. The following season he again made representative appearances in Brisbane for games III and IV of the interstate series. Gilbert then played in the 1942 Grand Final loss to Canterbury-Bankstown. The outbreak of war then interrupted his football career.

== War service ==
Gilbert's football career was interrupted due to his enlistment in the Australian Army in 1942. He served in the 54 Anti-Aircraft regiment as a gunner and was not discharged from active service until the war was over in November 1945. Both his younger brothers Jack Gilbert and James also saw active service. James, like Herb was in the 54th Anti-Aircraft Regiment and was stationed in the Northern Territory

== Post-war career ==
After discharge Gilbert returned to football, moving to the Balmain club for the 1946 season. In 1946 he represented New South Wales against England during the first post-war Lions tour and made another appearance for the Blues in the inter-state series. That year Balmain reached the Grand Final against his former club St. George. Gilbert played in a close game, won by Balmain 13–12. Tensions of the encounter overflowed after full-time and the match concluded on an ugly note when Saints forward, Jim Hale went toe-to-toe with Gilbert. Hale was then attacked by a spectator and an all-in brawl followed. Gilbert won another premiership with Balmain Tigers in season 1947 when his team defeated Canterbury-Bankstown in the Grand Final. He retired after the 1948 NSWRFL season. Gilbert was a member of the New South Wales rugby league team on eight occasions between 1940 and 1946.

Herbert Michael Gilbert died on 31 October 1983, aged 66.

== On-line sources ==
- Herb Gilbert Jr. at yetsredayshero.com.au
- Herb Gilbert Jr. at nrlstats.com
- Dragons History at showroom.com.au

== Published sources ==
- Whiticker, Alan & Hudson, Glen (2006) The Encyclopedia of Rugby League Players, Gavin Allen Publishing, Sydney
- Haddan, Steve (2007) The Finals – 100 Years of National Rugby League Finals, Steve Haddan Publishing, Brisbane
