= Dawson Buckley =

Australian rugby league footballer

Personal information
- Full name: Dawson William Buckley
- Born: 24 March 1917; Summer Hill, New South Wales, Australia
- Died: 27 June 1993 (aged 76); Leichhardt, New South Wales, Australia

Playing information
- Position: Prop, Lock
Club
Years	Team	Pld	T	G	FG	P
1938–47	Balmain	113	20	3	0	66
Representative
Years	Team	Pld	T	G	FG	P
1942	NSW City	1	0	0	0	0
- Source: As of 14 February 2019

Dawson William Buckley (1917-1993) was an Australian rugby league footballer who played in the 1930s and 1940s.

== Playing career ==
Balmain Premiers 1939 - Buckley 2nd row 3rd from right

Buckley was a dual premiership winning player with Balmain Tigers. He played with Balmain for ten seasons from 1938-1947.

He played prop forward in the winning Balmain teams of 1939 and played lock in the 1944 Grand Final. The war curtailed the back end of his career from 1945-1946, as he was not discharged from the Australian Army until the end of 1946. He couldn't get back into the first grade team in 1947, and retired at the end of the year.

Buckley represented N.S.W. City Firsts on one occasions in 1942.

Buckley died on 27 June 1993, aged 76 at his Leichhardt, New South Wales home.
