= Charlie Montgomery =

Australian rugby league footballer (1924–1995)

- Charlie Montgomery, 1941

Personal information
- Full name: Charles Henry Montgomery
- Born: 1 July 1924 Chatswood, New South Wales
- Died: 4 February 1995 (aged 70) Townsville, Queensland

Playing information
- Position: Prop
Club
Years	Team	Pld	T	G	FG	P
1941–42	St. George	32	10	1	0	32
1944–45	Newtown	22	2	0	0	6
	Total	54	12	1	0	38
Representative
Years	Team	Pld	T	G	FG	P
1940	NSW Country	1	0	0	0	0

Charles Montgomery (1924–1995) was an Australian rugby league footballer who played in the 1940s. He was a premiership winning prop-forward with St. George and finished his career with Newtown.

== Playing career ==
'Chassa' Montgomery played two seasons with St. George Dragons between 1941 and 1942, and played in the front-row in their victorious 1941 Grand Final, in the process becoming the youngest player to ever win a premiership at 17 years and 60 days. He then moved to Newtown, where he played another two seasons between 1944 and 1945. He made another Grand Final appearance at prop-forward in the Newtown side that lost the 1944 Grand Final to Balmain.

Both sides had been accused of "dogging it" in the Final where they met, and allowing Balmain to win so that they would need to meet in a Grand Final a week later.

Montgomery went on to be captain/coach in Townsville, Queensland in the early 1960s, and continued playing well into his 40s.

== Post playing ==
In his later years, Montgomery was a selector for the Townsville Foley shield team in 1974–5. Montgomery died in Townsville, Queensland on 4 Feb 1995, age 71.

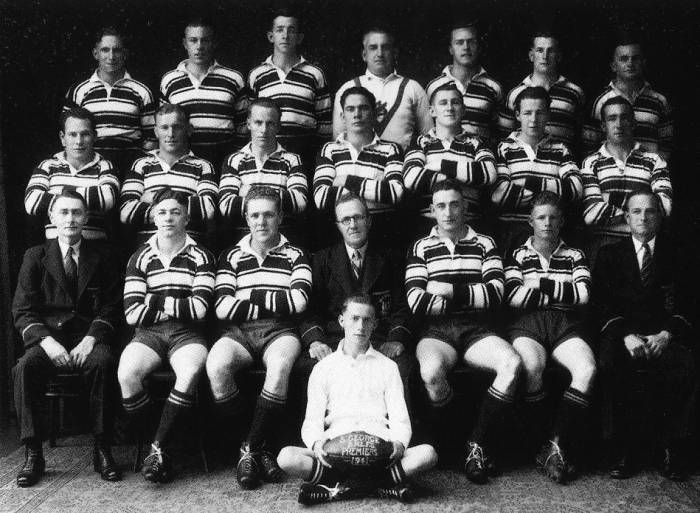
Charlie Montgomery (middle 2nd from left) in St. George's 1941 premiership team
