= Bill Hale =

Australian rugby league footballer and coach

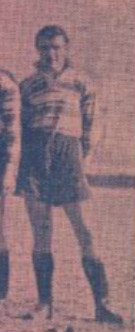
- Bill Hale. St.George,1936

Personal information
- Full name: William George Hale
- Born: 18 June 1915 Araluen, New South Wales, Australia
- Died: 2 July 2007 (aged 92) Georges Hall, New South Wales, Australia

Playing information
- Position: Prop
Club
Years	Team	Pld	T	G	FG	P
1936	St. George	5	0	0	0	0
1940	St. George	5	0	0	0	0
	Total	10	0	0	0	0
- Relatives: Jim Hale (brother)

Bill Hale (1915–2007) was an Australian rugby league footballer who played in the 1930s and 1940s.

Hale was a big front row forward who played at St. George with his younger brother Jim Hale. His career was interrupted when he was moved around N.S.W. due to his employment in the Police Force. Bill Hale played two seasons of first grade: 1936 and 1940, although he did feature in the lower grades in 1939.

He later became the captain/coach of Nowra before retiring from Rugby League.

Hale died on 2 July 2007 at Georges Hall, New South Wales aged 92.
