= Athol Smith =

Australian RL coach and former rugby league footballer

Personal information
- Full name: Athol William Smith
- Born: 27 August 1913 Lismore, New South Wales, Australia
- Died: 21 September 1953 (aged 40) Kogarah, New South Wales, Australia

Playing information
- Position: Second-row
Club
Years	Team	Pld	T	G	FG	P
1935–38	Western Suburbs	45	13	0	0	39
1939–45	Balmain	95	29	0	0	87
19??–??	Souths (Toowoomba)
	Total	140	42	0	0	126
Representative
Years	Team	Pld	T	G	FG	P
1937	Country NSW	1	0	0	0	0

Coaching information
Club
Years	Team	Gms	W	D	L	W%
1948–50	Balmain	66	40	6	20	61

Athol William Smith (1913–1953) was an Australian rugby league footballer who played in the 1930s, 1940s and 1950s. A Country New South Wales representative forward, he played club football in Sydney for Western Suburbs and Balmain (with whom he won the 1939 and 1944 NSWRFL Premierships and also later coached)

== Playing career ==
Balmain Premiers 1939 - Smith 1st row 2nd from right

Smith played seven seasons for the Balmain club between 1939 and 1945. He was a dual premiership winner with the Tigers, winning both the 1939 and the 1944 grand finals with them.

He later coached the club between 1948 and 1950.

== Death ==
Smith died on 21 September 1953, aged 40.
