= Bob Gilbert =

Australian rugby league footballer

Personal information
- Full name: James Robert Gilbert
- Born: 2 May 1923; Bexley, New South Wales
- Died: 23 July 1991 (aged 68); Chifley, Australian Capital Territory

Playing information
- Position: Centre
Club
Years	Team	Pld	T	G	FG	P
1945	St. George	4	0	0	0	0
- Father: Herb Gilbert
- Relatives: Herb Gilbert Jr. (brother); Jack Gilbert (brother)

James Robert 'Bob' Gilbert (2 May 1923 – 23 July 1991) was an Australian rugby league footballer who played in the 1940s.

Gilbert was the youngest son of the legendary rugby league player Herb Gilbert and brother of Herb Gilbert Jr. and Jack Gilbert. After returning from active service in World War II, Bob Gilbert played 4 games with St. George Dragons during 1945. He continued in the lower grades at Saints until the late 1940s before retirement.

Gilbert died in Chifley, Australian Capital Territory on 23 July 1991.
