= Sam Gilbert (Australian footballer) =

Australian rules footballer (born 1986)

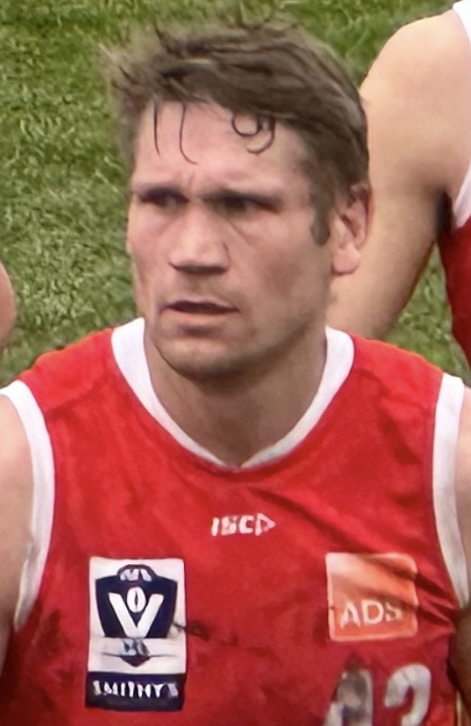
- Gilbert with the Northern Bullants in 2024

Personal information
- Full name: Samuel Gilbert
- Born: 19 August 1986 (age 40); New South Wales, Australia
- Original team: Southport (QAFL)
- Draft: No. 33, 2005 National Draft, St Kilda
- Height: 194 cm (6 ft 4 in)
- Weight: 90 kg (198 lb)
- Position: Defender

Playing career^{1}
Years	Club	Games (Goals)
2006–2018	St Kilda	208 (38)

International team honours^{2}
Years	Team	Games (Goals)
2010	Australia	2
- ^{1} Playing statistics correct to the end of 2018.^{2} Representative statistics correct as of 2010.

Career highlights
- AFL Rising Star nominee: 2007

Samuel Gilbert (born 19 August 1986) is an Australian rules footballer who most recently played for the Northern Bullants in the Victorian Football League (VFL). He previously played professionally for the St Kilda Football Club in the Australian Football League (AFL).

== Early life ==
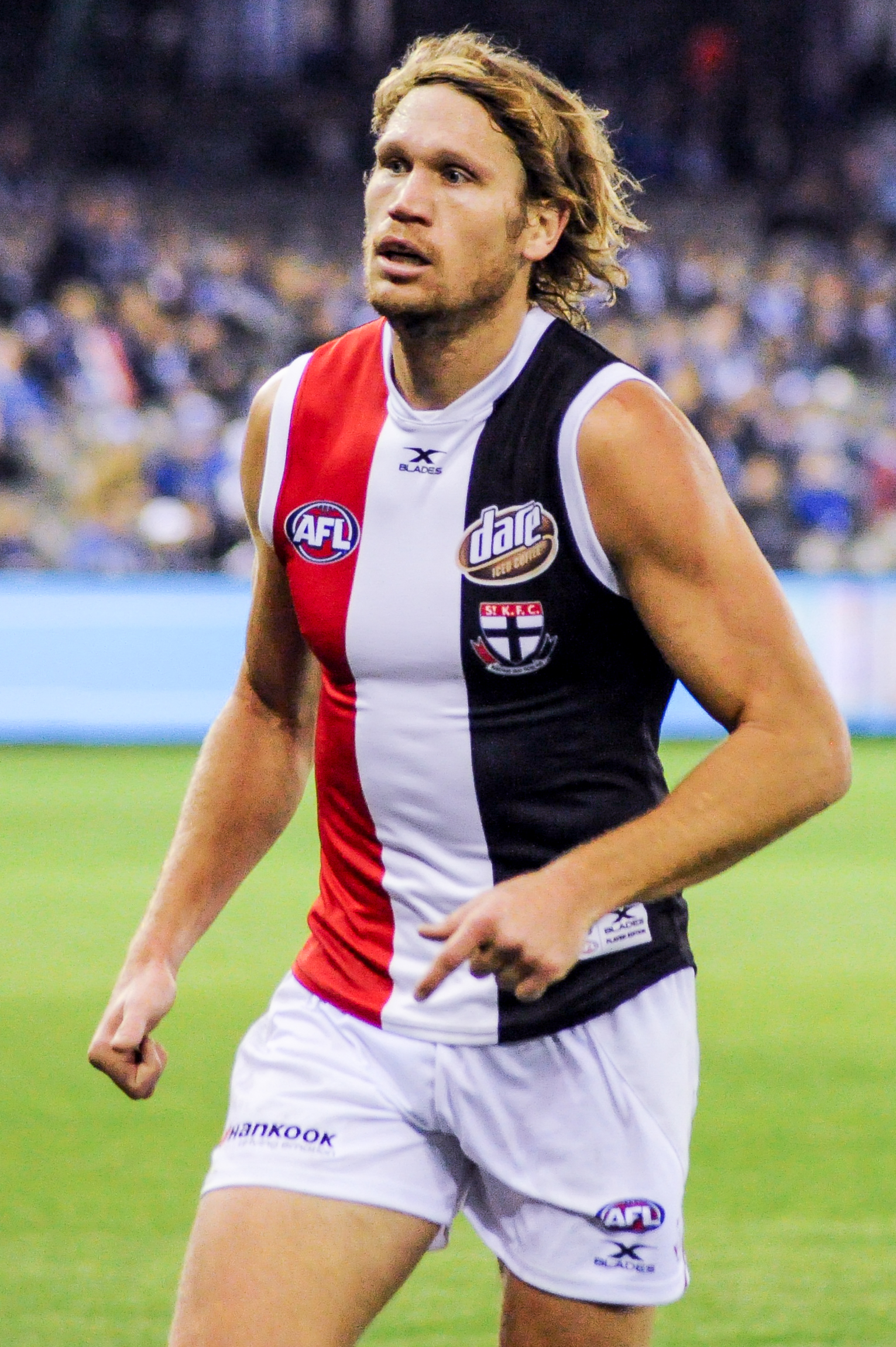
Gilbert playing for St Kilda during the 2017 AFL season

Gilbert was brought up in Terranora in northern New South Wales. His first love as a child was rugby league. His grandfather (Jack Gilbert) and great-grandfather (Herb Gilbert) played for St. George Dragons in the New South Wales Rugby Football League Premiership. Herb was also a dual-code rugby international who captained Australia at rugby league. Sam played for the Bilambil Jets in the Group 18 Rugby League on the New South Wales Northern Coast.

At the age of 14, he moved the Gold Coast, Queensland. He attended Palm Beach Currumbin High School throughout his teenage years. At the age of 15, he began playing Australian rules football at the Tweed Coolangatta Junior Football Club. He made the switch after coming to the realisation that his body type - tall and skinny was not ideally suited to rugby league. He immediately shone, being selected in the Gold Coast representative under-16 team. He played senior football with the Southport Sharks. He missed state selection at under 16 and 18 level being a late bloomer but was selected as captain of the Under 21 Queensland Scorpions Representative Side that defeated Western Australia attracting the eyes of talend scouts. His 2005 Rising Star award at Southport helped consolidate his prospect in the AFL Draft. Gilbert was selected by the Saints with pick No.33 in the 2005 AFL draft.

== Career ==
=== AFL ===
Gilbert was selected by St Kilda with pick No. 33 in the 2005 AFL draft. He made his AFL debut in Round 8, 2006 against Carlton.

The 2007 season brought further opportunities for Gilbert and he was included for the Round 5 match against Port Adelaide, after improved form in St Kilda's VFL affiliated team, the Casey Scorpions. Setting the pattern for his teammates, Gilbert laid seven tackles. He held his spot in the side and improved under coach Ross Lyon, playing every game for the rest of the year.

Gilbert played in St Kilda's 2008 NAB Cup winning side - the club's third pre-season cup win.

After a statistically strong performance in Round 16, 2008, in which he had 16 kicks, 12 marks and 6 handballs, he was awarded the AFL Rising Star Nomination for that round.

Gilbert played in 19 of 22 matches in the 2009 home and away rounds. St Kilda qualified in first position for the 2009 finals series, winning the club's third minor premiership.

At the end of the 2018 season, Gilbert was delisted by St Kilda and retired from the AFL.

=== Post-AFL ===
On 21 November 2018, Gilbert joined Sandringham (St Kilda's reserves affiliate) in the Victorian Football League (VFL) as a playing assistant coach. He formed part of the club's leadership group for the 2019 VFL season, wearing the number 78.

In May 2019, Gilbert tested positive for cocaine metabolite benzoylecgonine on the day of a game, in violation of anti-doping rules. He continued to play at least one more game, against Coburg on 2 June 2019, before being provisionally suspended four days later on 6 June. He formally accepted the suspension on 9 April 2020.

On 31 May 2024, at the age of 37, Gilbert returned to the VFL and joined the Northern Bullants. He made his debut for the Bullants in round 10 of the 2024 season against Carlton, recording 12 disposals in a 12-point victory.

== Personal life ==
Gilbert is a cousin of former NBL basketball player Larry Davidson.
