= William Ryan (rugby league) =

Australian rugby league footballer

Personal information
- Full name: William Joseph Ryan
- Born: 24 September 1919 Petersham, New South Wales, Australia
- Died: 7 December 1942 (aged 23) near Sanananda, Territory of New Guinea

Playing information
- Position: Centre
Club
Years	Team	Pld	T	G	FG	P
1941	Newtown Bluebags	12	11	0	0	33
Representative
Years	Team	Pld	T	G	FG	P
1941	New South Wales	1	1	0	0	3
1941	New South Wales City	1	0	0	0	0
- Relatives: Bruce Ryan (brother)
- Military career
- Allegiance: Australia
- Branch: Australian Army
- Service years: 1941-1942
- Rank: Lieutenant
- Unit: 55/53 Infantry Battalion
- Conflicts: World War II; Kokoda Track campaign

William Joseph Ryan (24 September 1919 – 7 December 1942) was an Australian rugby league footballer who played in the New South Wales Rugby League for Newtown Bluebags. He also represented New South Wales.

== Early life and rugby career ==
Ryan was born on 24 September 1919 in Petersham to William Joseph and Eva Ryan. His brother, Bruce, would also play rugby league for Newtown Bluebags.

Ryan played as a centre in 12 matches for Newtown Bluebags in 1941, gaining 11 tries and 33 points. He also played representatively for New South Wales and New South Wales City.

== Military career ==
Ryan served as a lieutenant in the 55/53 Infantry Battalion of the Second Australian Imperial Force during the Second World War. He was killed near Sanananda in the New Guinea campaign on 7 December 1942. Ryan is buried at Port Moresby (Bomana) War Cemetery.

== Career statistics ==
Appearances and goals by club, season and competition
Club	Season	Division	League				Other				Total			
Club	Season	Division	Apps	Tries	Goals	Points	Apps	Tries	Goals	Points	Apps	Tries	Goals	Points
Newtown Bluebags	1941	New South Wales Rugby League	12	11	0	33	0	0	0	0	12	11	0	33
Club career total			12	11	0	33	0	0	0	0	12	11	0	33
New South Wales	1941	Representative	1	1	0	3	0	0	0	0	1	1	0	3
New South Wales City	1941	Representative	1	0	0	0	0	0	0	0	1	0	0	0
Representative career total			2	1	0	3	0	0	0	0	2	1	0	3
Career total			14	12	0	36	0	0	0	0	14	12	0	36
