= Jim Hale =

Australian rugby league footballer

- Jim Hale, 1941

Personal information
- Full name: James Alfred Hale
- Born: 10 July 1916; Kogarah, New South Wales, Australia
- Died: 28 December 1992 (aged 76); Sylvania, New South Wales, Australia

Playing information
- Position: Second-row
Club
Years	Team	Pld	T	G	FG	P
1940	South Sydney	3	1	0	0	3
1941–47	St. George	60	20	0	0	60
1948–49	Boorowa Rovers
	Total	63	21	0	0	63
- Relatives: Bill Hale (brother)

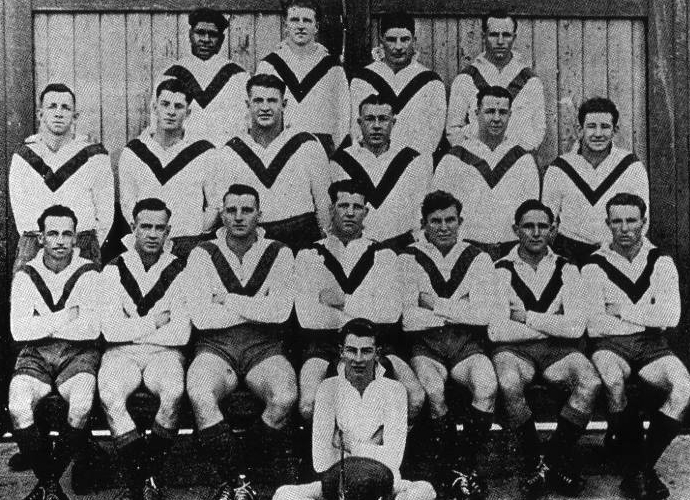
Hale (middle row left) in St.George's 1946 side - minor premiers

James Alfred Hale (10 July 1916 - 28 December 1992) was an Australian rugby league footballer who played in the 1940s.

== Career ==
Hale was graded with the South Sydney club in 1940 and switched mid-season to join St. George with whom he played seven seasons between 1941 and 1947.

He is remembered as the second-row forward in the St George side that was defeated in the 1946 Grand Final by Balmain. At the end of the game, Jim Hale and his ex team-mate Herb Gilbert, Jr. were involved in a brawl when a spectator jumped onto the Sydney Cricket Ground playing area and punched Hale. The incident almost caused a riot amongst rival players and fans and resulted in a number of arrests by police.

Hale, like his father Percy (1887-1953), was an amateur heavy-weight boxer, and the brawl between him and Gilbert was a huge talking point in the Sydney press for days afterward. A brother, Bill Hale also played for St. George

After retiring from Sydney first grade football, Hale captain coached the Boorowa Rovers Rugby League Club in 1948–1949.

== Death ==
Hale died on 28 December 1992, aged 76.
