= John Whitfield (rugby league) =

Australian rugby league footballer

Personal information
- Full name: John Peter Whitfield
- Born: 29 December 1917 Canterbury, New South Wales, Australia
- Died: 29 August 2000 (aged 82) Drummoyne, New South Wales, Australia

Playing information
- Position: Prop, Second-row
Club
Years	Team	Pld	T	G	FG	P
1939–45	South Sydney	46	12	0	0	36
1946	Newtown	4	0	0	0	0
	Total	50	12	0	0	36
- Source: As of 25 April 2019

John Whitfield (1917–2000) was an Australian professional rugby league footballer who played in the 1930s and 1940s. He played for South Sydney and Newtown in the New South Wales Rugby League (NSWRL) competition.

== Background ==
Whitfield was a junior weight lifting champion and played for Canterbury-Bankstown in the lower grades before signing with South Sydney.

== Playing career ==
Whitfield made his first grade debut in Round 9 1939 against Western Suburbs. Whitfield scored a hat-trick against his former club Canterbury in Round 12 1939. Souths reached the grand final after defeating St George in the preliminary final and their opponents in the final were minor premiers Balmain.

Whitfield played at prop as Souths were held tryless and suffered a heavy 33–4 defeat at the Sydney Cricket Ground. Following the grand final defeat, Souths went through a period of decline which had not been seen at the club before. Souths went on to miss the finals in the next 4 years before briefly returning to form in 1944. Whitfield's final season for Souths was one of the club's worst as they finished last on the table with 1 win for the entire season.

In 1946, Whitfield joined his brother-in-law Frank 'Bumper' Farrell at Newtown and played 4 games for them before retiring at the conclusion of the 1946 season.
