= Don Gulliver =

Australian rugby league footballer

Personal information
- Full name: Donald Manser Gulliver
- Born: 14 December 1915 Dubbo, New South Wales, Australia
- Died: 12 September 1958 (aged 42)

Playing information
- Position: Second-row, Lock
Club
Years	Team	Pld	T	G	FG	P
1937–40	Western Suburbs	29	5	0	0	15
1941–44	Eastern Suburbs	53	3	0	0	9
	Total	82	8	0	0	24
Representative
Years	Team	Pld	T	G	FG	P
1939	New South Wales	2	0	0	0	0
- Source: As of 17 October 2025

Donald Manser Gulliver was an Australian rugby league footballer who played in the 1930s and 1940s. He played for Western Suburbs and Eastern Suburbs in the NSWRL competition.

== Background ==
Gulliver played rugby league for Western Division and Dubbo before signing with Western Suburbs in 1937.

== Playing career ==
Gulliver made his first grade debut for Western Suburbs in Round 1 1937 against North Sydney at North Sydney Oval. Gulliver's time at Western Suburbs was not very successful as the club finished second last on the table between 1937 and 1939 and finished last in 1940. Gulliver then signed with Eastern Suburbs after being released by Wests.

In 1941, Eastern Suburbs reached their 6th grand final in 8 years with the opponents this time being St George. Gulliver played at second-row in the match which was played at the Sydney Cricket Ground. St George led 12–6 at halftime and were never troubled by Eastern Suburbs winning their first premiership by a score of 31–14 in front of 39,957 people.

The following year in 1942, Easts reached the preliminary final against St George but were defeated by a score of 18–5 with Gulliver playing at lock in the match.

Gulliver played with Eastern Suburbs up until the end of 1944 before retiring. At representative level, Gulliver played for New South Wales on 2 occasions in 1939.
