= Jack Winchester (rugby league) =

Australian rugby league footballer

Personal information
- Full name: Richard John Winchester
- Born: 4 January 1918 Leichhardt, New South Wales, Australia
- Died: 8 May 1992 (aged 74)

Playing information
- Position: Wing, Centre, Fullback
Club
| Years | Team | Pld | T | G | FG | P |
|---|---|---|---|---|---|---|
| 1939–44 | Balmain | 58 | 16 | 0 | 0 | 48 |
- Source: As of 25 April 2019

Jack Winchester was an Australian professional rugby league footballer who played in the 1930s and 1940s. He played for Balmain in the New South Wales Rugby League (NSWRL) competition.

== Playing career ==
Balmain Premiers 1939 - Winchester 2nd row 2nd from right

Winchester made his first grade debut for Balmain in Round 1 1938 against South Sydney at Leichhardt Oval. Winchester immediately established himself as a regular in the Balmain side and played in the club's semi final defeat against eventual premiers Canterbury-Bankstown.

In Round 3 1939, Winchester scored his first hat-trick against North Sydney at Leichhardt Oval. The same year, Winchester was a member of the Balmain side which won the 1939 premiership defeating South Sydney 33-4 in the grand final at the Sydney Cricket Ground.

In 1940, Winchester made 7 appearances as Balmain failed to defend their premiership finishing 5th on the table. In 1941, Winchester made 9 appearances as Balmain claimed the minor premiership but were defeated in the preliminary final by eventual premiers St George at the Sydney Cricket Ground.

The following season in 1942, Balmain finished second on the table but were defeated by Eastern Suburbs in the semi-final. The 1943 season was a mirror of the 1942 season as Balmain again finished second but were defeated in the semi-final by St George.

In his final season at Balmain, Winchester lost his place in the team and missed out on playing in the club's premiership victory over Newtown. Balmain had finished the season in 2nd place and defeated Newtown in the grand final. The rules at the time allowed for Newtown to challenge for a rematch as they finished as minor premiers. Balmain won the grand final challenge 12-8.
