= Albert Falvey Webster =

Albert Falvey Webster (born Boston, Massachusetts, 1848; died at sea, 27 December 1876) was a writer from the United States.

His father was a confectioner in Boston. After engaging for a short time in various kinds of business, he became a writer for magazines, and published many short stories in Scribner's Monthly, the Atlantic Monthly, and Appletons' Journal, in which appeared his "Boarding-House Sketches."

He also published a series of articles exposing abuses in the administration of criminal law and in the management of prisons. He was consumptive and went to California by way of the isthmus of Panama, and died on his way from San Francisco to Honolulu. He was buried in the Pacific. At the time of his death, Webster was engaged to be married to Una, eldest daughter of Nathaniel Hawthorne.

He left behind an unfinished novel. His most notable stories are "Our Friend Sullivan," "My Daughter's Watch," "The Clytemnestra," and "An Operation in Money."
