= Ray Pratt =

Australian rugby league footballer (1915–1990)

- Pratt with St George in 1941

Personal information
- Full name: Raymond Thomas Pratt
- Born: 14 March 1915; Newtown, New South Wales, Australia
- Died: 15 May 1990 (aged 75); Kingsgrove, New South Wales, Australia

Playing information
- Position: Fullback, wing, centre
Club
Years	Team	Pld	T	G	FG	P
1938–41	St George	14	0	44	0	88
1945–46	Eastern Suburbs	20	0	18	0	36
	Total	34	0	62	0	124
- Source: As of 4 July 2019

Raymond Thomas Pratt (14 March 1915 – 15 May 1990), also known as Roy Pratt, was an Australian rugby league footballer who played in the 1930s and 1940s. Primarily a fullback, he played for St George and Eastern Suburbs in the NSWRFL competition, winning a premiership with Easts in 1945.

== Playing career ==
Pratt made his first grade debut for St. George in the first round of the 1938 season against Eastern Suburbs at the Sydney Cricket Ground. At the end of the 1938 season, St George finished last on the table claiming their third and last wooden spoon. As of 2023, neither St. George nor the joint venture of St. George Illawarra have finished last in the competition.

In 1941, Pratt played 8 games but missed out on playing in the 1941 NSWRFL grand final victory over Easts. The win was the club's first premiership since entering the competition in 1921.

In 1945, Eastern Suburbs reached the grand final against Balmain. In front of 44,585 spectators at the Sydney Cricket Ground, Easts won the match 22–18, claiming their 9th premiership, with Pratt playing at fullback. He retired following the 1946 season.

Pratt also played first-grade cricket, opening the batting for St George.
