= Hec Day =

Australian rugby league footballer

Personal information
- Full name: Hector Mathew Day
- Born: 23 July 1911
- Died: 12 December 1974 (aged 63)

Playing information
- Position: Fullback
Club
Years	Team	Pld	T	G	FG	P
1939–43	Balmain	40	4	21	0	54

Hec Day was an Australian professional rugby league footballer who played in the 1930s and 1940s. He played for Balmain as a fullback.

== Playing career ==
Balmain Premiers 1939 - Day 2nd row 4th from right

Day made his debut in Round 1 of the 1939 season for Balmain against Newtown which Balmain won 13–9.

The same year, Day was a member of the Balmain side which won the 1939 premiership defeating South Sydney 33–4 in the grand final at the Sydney Cricket Ground with Day kicking five goals in the match.

Day played in four more seasons for Balmain and retired at the end of 1943.
