= Jim Quealey =

Australian rugby league footballer (born 1917)

Personal information
- Full name: James Leslie Quealey
- Born: 20 June 1917 Sydney, Australia

Playing information
- Position: Halfback
Club
Years	Team	Pld	T	G	FG	P
1938–45	Balmain	80	13	46	0	131
Representative
Years	Team	Pld	T	G	FG	P
1940	New South Wales	1	0	0	0	0

James Leslie Quealey (born 20 June 1917) was an Australian professional rugby league footballer who played in the 1930s and 1940s. He played for Balmain as a halfback. He was born in Sydney.

== Playing career ==
Quealey made his debut in 1938 for Balmain. The following year, Quealey was a member of the Balmain side which won the 1939 premiership defeating South Sydney 33–4 in the grand final at the Sydney Cricket Ground with Quealey scoring a try in the rout. In 1940, Quealey was selected to play for New South Wales in an interstate game against Queensland. Quealey played with Balmain for another 5 seasons but was not a member of the 1944 premiership winning side. He retired at the end of 1945.
