= Bruce Ryan (rugby league) =

Australian RL coach and former rugby league footballer

Personal information
- Full name: Bruce Loyola Ryan
- Born: 7 July 1921 Newtown, New South Wales, Australia
- Died: 25 June 2002 (aged 80) Sydney, New South Wales, Australia

Playing information
- Position: Wing
Club
Years	Team	Pld	T	G	FG	P
1941–47	Newtown	38	27	0	0	81
1947–50	Hull FC	84	60	0	0	180
1950–52	Leeds	57	42	0	0	126
	Total	179	129	0	0	387

Coaching information
Club
Years	Team	Gms	W	D	L	W%
1956	North Sydney	18	5	1	12	28
- Relatives: Bill Ryan (brother)

Bruce Loyola Ryan (1921–2002) was an Australian rugby league footballer who played in the 1940s and 1950s.

== Playing career ==
Ryan was a champion school-boy sprinter, before being graded at the Newtown in 1940. He went on to play six seasons for Newtown but his career was interrupted by World War II, during which he served in the Australian Army and later the Royal Australian Air Force. While he played for the Jets he was part of the squad that won the 1943 Grand Final. He also played in the team that were defeated in the 1944 Grand Final.

After retiring from Newtown at the end of the 1947 season, he travelled to England to join Hull FC for the 1947–48 season, where he was met by 4,000 fans waiting to greet him at Paragon Station. He went on to play for three seasons, scoring 60 tries in 84 games. Ryan transferred to Leeds for a then world record fee of £4,750, where he played for two seasons, scoring 42 tries in 57 games.

== Post playing ==
He later joined the coaching staff of North Sydney in 1956.

Ryan died on 25 June 2002, 12 days before his 81st birthday.

Sporting positions
Preceded by Rex Harrison; 1954–1955	Coach North Sydney; 1956	Succeeded by Trevor Allan; 1957–1958
