= Albert Webster (rugby league) =

Australian rugby league footballer

Personal information
- Full name: Albert Webster
- Born: 9 May 1920; Sydney, New South Wales, Australia
- Died: 18 November 2014 (aged 94); Sydney, New South Wales, Australia

Playing information
- Position: Halfback
Club
| Years | Team | Pld | T | G | FG | P |
|---|---|---|---|---|---|---|
| 1939–46 | South Sydney | 21 | 3 | 0 | 0 | 9 |
- Source: As of 24 April 2019

Albert Webster (1920-2014) was an Australian professional rugby league footballer who played in the 1930s and 1940s. He played for South Sydney in the New South Wales Rugby League (NSWRL) competition.

== Playing career ==
Webster made his first grade debut against Newtown in Round 10 1939 at Earl Park, Arncliffe. That season, Souths finished in 4th position and reached the grand final after defeating St George in the preliminary final.

Souths opponents in the grand final were minor premiers Balmain. Webster played at halfback as Souths were held tryless and suffered a heavy 33-4 defeat at the Sydney Cricket Ground. In the following seasons, Webster mainly played reserve grade for the club and in his final season he played 8 games as Souths finished last claiming the wooden spoon in 1946. Webster retired from playing following the conclusion of this season. In total, Webster played 42 games for the club across all grades.
