= Alan Whiticker =

Australian writer

Alan James Whiticker
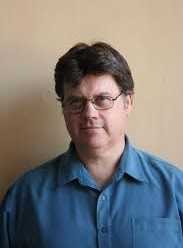
- Born: 1958 (age 67–68); Penrith, New South Wales
- Occupations: Author, publisher
- Known for: History; sport; biography; true crime/lifesyle

Alan James Whiticker (born 1958) is an Australian non-fiction author and publisher, with over 50 published books on history, sport, biography, true crime and lifestyle.

Whiticker writes primarily on matters pertaining to the history of the sport of rugby league in Australia, but he has also published works on subjects as diverse as classical film, pop culture, the Wanda Beach Murders and an adaptation of Homer's Iliad. He is a former teacher and commissioning editor for a publishing company but now works as a freelance writer.

== Early life and education ==
Whiticker was born in Penrith, New South Wales on 15 December 1958. He attended St Dominic's College, Penrith and Nepean College of Advanced Education (now Western Sydney University), where he obtained a Diploma of Teaching in 1979 and a Bachelor of Education (Primary) degree in 1985. He later obtained his master's degree in Education (Administration) in 1997. Before writing full-time, he worked as a primary school teacher and assistant principal at Catholic schools in Western Sydney for 30 years, and lectured at Western Sydney University in 2008.

== Rugby league works ==
- The History of the Balmain Tigers, Sherborne Sutherland Publishing, 1988 ISBN 1-86275-000-9
- The History of The North Sydney Bears (with Greg Anderson), Sherborne Sutherland Publishing, 1988 ISBN 1-86275-001-7
- Grand Finals of the New South Wales Rugby League, Gary Allen, 1992 ISBN 1-875169-17-2
- The Terry Lamb Story, Gary Allen, 1992 ISBN 1-875169-14-8
- Rugby League Test Matches in Australia (with Ian Collis), Sydney: ABC Books for the Australian Broadcasting Corporation, 1994 ISBN 0-7333-0329-3
- From the Bush to Brookvale: The Cliff Lyons story, Gary Allen, 2000 ISBN 1-875169-80-6
- Hooked on League: Royce Simmons, Gary Allen, 2001 ISBN 1-875169-87-3
- Mat Rogers: Off The Wing On A Prayer (with Mat Rogers), ESM Sports, 2002 ISBN 0-9580981-0-7
- The History of Rugby League Clubs (with Ian Collis), New Holland Publishers, 2004 ISBN 978-1-74257-010-5
- Captaining the Kangaroos, New Holland Publishers, 2004 ISBN 1-74110-041-0
- 100 Years of Rugby League (with Ian Collis), New Holland Publishers, 2007 ISBN 978-1-74110-463-9
- The Encyclopedia of Rugby League Players (with Glen Hudson, 6th Edition), Gary Allen, 2007 ISBN 978-1-877082-93-1
- Rugby League: 100 Years in Pictures (with Ian Collis), New Holland Publishers, 2008 ISBN 978-1-74110-596-4
- The Top 10 of Rugby League (with Ian Collis), New Holland Publishers, 2010 ISBN 978-1-74257-042-6
- Rugby League Through the Decades (with Ian Collis), New Holland Publishers, 2011 ISBN 978-1-74257-136-2
- Glory Days: The Story of South Sydney's Golden Era, New Holland Publishers, 2011 ISBN 978-1-74257-138-6
- 101 Great Rugby League Players (with Ian Collis), New Holland Publishers, 2012 ISBN 978-1-74257-132-4
- Rugby League: Every Premiership Match (with Ian Collis), New Holland Publishers, 2013 ISBN 978-1-74257-437-0
- Mud, Blood and Beer: Rugby League in the 1970s, New Holland Publishers, 2016 ISBN 978-1-74257-515-5
- The State of Origin Companion: Interstate Rugby League Since 1908, New Holland Publishers, 2020 ISBN 978-1-76079-213-8
- League on Sunday, Work on Monday (with Tony Loxley and Ian Collis), Full Throttle Publishing, 2020 ISBN 978-0-64888-740-9
- Very Tough Men: Rugby League in the 1980s (with Tony Loxley), Full Throttle Publishing, 2021 ISBN 978-064888-741-6
- Tommy: The Extraordinary Career of Tommy Raudonikis, New Holland Publishers, 2021 ISBN 978-1-76079-379-1
- The Blues: NSW's State of Origin Heroes, Gelding Street Press, 2024 ISBN 978-0-64520-703-3
- Rugby League in the 1980s: The Power and the Passion (with Ian Collis), Gelding Street Press, 2024 ISBN 978-0-64520-712-5

== True crime ==
- Wanda: The Untold Story of the Wanda Beach Murders, New Holland Publishers, 2003 ISBN 1-86436-814-4
- Twelve Crimes That Shocked The Nation, New Holland Publishers, 2005 ISBN 1-74110-110-7
- Searching for the Beaumont Children: Australia's Most Famous Unsolved Mystery, John Wiley & Sons Australia, 2006 ISBN 978-1-74031-106-9
- Crimes of the Century, New Holland Publishers, 2006 ISBN 978-1-74110-363-2
- Another 12 Crimes that Shocked the Nation, New Holland Publishers, 2007 ISBN 978-1-74110-494-3
- Derek Percy: Australian Psycho, New Holland Publishers, 2008 ISBN 978-1-74110-632-9
- Unsolved Crimes: The cases that haunt Australia, New Holland Publishers, 2009 ISBN 978-1-74110-655-8
- The Satin Man: uncovering the mystery of the missing Beaumont children (with Stuart Mullins), New Holland Publishers, 2013 ISBN 978-1-74257308-3
- I Survived Kerobokan (with Paul Conibeer), New Holland Publishers, 2014, ISBN 978-1-74257-496-7
- Anita Cobby: The Crime that Shocked the Nation, New Holland Publishers, 2015 ISBN 978-1-74257-791-3

== Other works ==
- Jimmy Barnes: Say It Loud (with Jimmy Barnes), Gary Allen, 2002 ISBN 1-875169-90-3
- The Battle of Troy: an Adaptation of Homer's Iliad, illustrated by Giovanni Caselli, New Holland Publishers, 2004 ISBN 1-74110-133-6
- Speeches That Shaped the Modern World, New Holland Publishers, 2005 ISBN 1-74110-309-6
- Speeches That Reshaped the Modern World, New Holland Publishers, 2008 ISBN 978-1-74110-726-5
- Shannon Noll: So Far, New Holland Publishers, 2012 ISBN 978-1-74257-324-3
- The Way We Were, New Holland Publishers, 2013 ISBN 978-1-74257-324-3
- British Pop Invasion, New Holland Publishers, 2014 ISBN 978-1-74257-628-2
- Retro New York, New Holland Publishers, 2015 ISBN 978-1-74257-713-5
- Speeches That Defined the World, New Holland Publishers, 2016 ISBN 978-1-74257-888-0
- The Classics: The Greatest Films of the 20th Century, New Holland Publishers, 2016 ISBN 978-1-74257-847-7
- Classic Albums That Changed My Life: The Vinyl That Made A Generation, New Holland Publishers, 2018 ISBN 978-1-92102-438-2
- Don't Die Wondering: the Pat Webster Story, New Holland Publishers, 2019 ISBN 978-1-76079-187-2
- The Immortals of Australian Horse Racing, Gelding Street Press, 2021 ISBN 978-1-92594-696-3
- Legends of the Track: Australia's Champion Jockey and Trainers, Gelding Street Press, 2023 ISBN 978-0-64520-716-3
