= List of Balmain Tigers players =

This is a list of rugby league footballers who played first-grade for the Balmain Tigers in Australia's top-level domestic men's rugby-league club competition.

== First-grade players (1908–1999) ==
Club							
No.	Name	Career	Appearances	Tries	Goals	Field goals	Points
1	Joe Apoloney	1908–1912	43	9	0	0	27
2	Jacob Sleiman	1908	4	0	0	0	0
3	Alf Dobbs	1908–1909	6	3	0	0	9
4	George Robert Fisher	1908–1909	6	3	0	0	9
5	G Fitzpatrick	1908–1910	30	5	27	1	71
6	Robert Graves	1908–1913	54	12	1	0	38
7	Alf Latta	1908–1912	41	8	10	1	46
8	Ted McFadden	1908–1910	33	1	0	0	3
9	Tommy O'Donnell	1908–1910	20	3	0	0	9
10	Joe Regent	1908–1909	20	7	6	0	33
11	A Walker	1908–1910	27	6	0	0	18
12	A Ward	1908	8	0	0	0	0
13	George Wilcox	1908	9	2	0	0	6
14	Martin Laidlaw	1908–1909	9	1	0	0	3
15	Barrell	1908	1	0	0	0	0
16	James Smellie	1908	1	0	0	0	0
17	Pat Carroll	1908	1	0	0	0	0
18	T Smith	1908–1909	5	1	1	0	5
19	Fred Woolley	1908–1910	25	0	0	0	0
20	A Davidson	1908	2	0	0	0	0
21	John Woodward	1908–1913	52	4	0	0	12
22	W Davis	1909	1	0	0	0	0
23	J Davidson	1909–1911	3	0	0	0	0
24	Lloyd Edwards	1909–1910	21	2	0	0	6
25	S Moore	1909	5	3	0	0	9
26	F Ward	1909–1911	27	1	0	0	3
27	H Jones	1909–1912	8	1	0	0	3
28	Arthur Halloway	1909–1911, 1915–1920	108	47	0	0	141
29	J Jackson	1909	1	0	0	0	0
30	Black	1909–1910	2	1	2	0	7
31	Horace Balkwell	1910–1916	66	3	1	1	13
32	Bob Craig	1910–1919	92	14	2	0	46
33	Nutts	1910	1	0	0	0	0
34	W. Smith	1910	12	5	1	0	17
35	Frank Woodward	1910	9	0	0	0	0
36	Arthur Surridge	1910	4	1	5	0	13
37	Lane	1910	1	0	0	0	0
38	F Cox	1910	5	0	0	0	0
39	W Franklin	1910	2	1	0	0	3
40	Stuart	1910	2	0	0	0	0
41	Charles Fraser	1910–1926	185	54	163	2	492
42	Lloyd Boyd	1910	2	1	0	0	3
43	Ted McGuinness	1910	1	0	0	0	0
44	F McKay	1910	2	1	0	0	3
45	Len Sawyer	1910–1913	4	0	0	0	0
46	Jack Hickey	1911	10	0	13	0	26
47	D Hilliard	1911	12	1	4	0	11
48	Owen McCarthy	1911	13	0	0	0	0
49	W McKay	1911	3	0	0	0	0
50	Charles McMurtrie	1911–1915	15	4	0	0	12
51	T Nolan	1911	1	0	0	0	0
52	R Smith	1911	2	0	0	0	0
53	B Wright	1911	14	7	0	0	21
54	C Stewart	1911–1912	3	1	0	0	3
55	James Woodward	1911–1912	11	0	0	0	0
56	Tommy Anderson	1911	2	0	0	0	0
57	W Kirk	1911	8	1	2	0	7
58	Gus Widmer	1911	4	1	0	0	4
59	M Jacobsen	1911	5	0	0	0	0
60	J King	1911	4	0	0	0	0
61	W Boyd	1911	1	0	0	0	0
62	J Johnson	1911	4	0	0	0	0
63	Frank Moore	1911–1914	36	3	2	1	15
64	E Rodney	1911–1912	5	0	0	0	0
65	H Murphy	1911–1915	11	4	0	0	12
66	George Cummins	1912–1915	57	8	50	0	124
67	William Geoghegan	1912	11	1	0	0	3
68	William Hilliard	1912	13	3	2	0	13
69	Albert Johnston	1912–1917	76	6	2	0	22
70	Lyall Wall	1912, 1914–1919	81	6	35	6	100
71	A Wheatley	1912–1913, 1915	25	1	0	0	3
72	George Wheatley	1912–1913	22	3	0	0	9
73	Angus Lennon	1912	5	2	0	0	6
74	Alf Liston	1912	1	0	0	0	0
75	J Dooley	1912	6	1	0	0	3
76	Jack Robinson	1912–1925	156	78	5	0	244
77	L Eyles	1913	1	0	0	0	0
78	Robert Fraser	1913	2	0	0	0	0
79	H Judge	1913	3	0	0	0	0
80	Bill Noble	1913	14	0	0	0	0
81	Ernie Hucker	1913	7	1	0	0	3
82	P Burns	1913–1914	22	6	0	0	18
83	George Potter	1913–1916, 1918–1921	48	24	3	0	78
84	Anthony Harrington	1913	7	0	4	0	8
85	D Cranston	1913–1916	25	1	1	0	5
86	Bill Schultz	1913–1924	142	15	0	0	45
87	P Gehrig	1913	1	0	0	0	0
88	P Spears	1913	1	0	0	0	0
89	W Green	1914–1915	15	1	3	0	9
90	Bill Kelly	1914–1915	27	16	0	0	48
91	McLaren	1914	1	0	0	0	0
92	Jack Blinco	1914–1915	25	1	0	0	3
93	H French	1914	4	0	0	0	0
94	Herbert Johnson	1914	4	2	0	0	6
95	W Winning	1914	3	0	0	0	0
96	James Brassill	1915–1918	21	9	0	0	27
97	C Scanlon	1915	1	0	0	0	0
98	George Robinson	1915–1928	85	24	44	0	160
99	Edward Burnicle	1915–1918	31	4	0	0	12
100	Jim Craig	1915–1921	51	20	22	0	104
101	Alf Fraser	1916–1925	129	15	0	0	45
102	Reg Latta	1916–1930	175	62	1	0	188
103	E Miller	1916	4	1	0	0	3
104	C Mackey	1916–1917	3	0	0	0	0
105	J Ashley	1916	4	0	1	0	2
106	Roy Algie	1916	1	0	0	0	0
107	Con Croghan	1916–1917	5	2	0	0	6
108	R Hough	1916	1	0	0	0	0
109	D Stewart	1916	7	0	0	0	0
110	R Proust	1917–1920	32	9	0	0	27
111	Horrie Watt	1917–1925	93	11	3	0	39
112	R Miller	1917–1919	37	7	36	0	93
113	Paddy Conaghan	1917–1920, 1924	35	19	1	0	59
114	George Challis	1918	10	0	0	0	0
115	G Kensey	1918	11	0	0	0	0
116	Billy Ryan	1918–1920	12	6	0	0	18
117	H Hall	1918	3	1	0	0	3
118	Jim Love	1918–1927	90	23	0	0	69
119	Mick Russell	1919–1924	65	10	89	0	208
120	Frank Maguire	1919	1	0	0	0	0
121	Edward Cummings	1919–1920	19	1	0	0	3
122	Joe Bennett	1919	1	0	0	0	0
123	C Chapman	1919	1	0	0	0	0
124	C Russell	1920–1923	9	0	0	0	0
125	Dally Brien	1920–1926	7	9	0	0	27
126	Syd Denham	1920–1922	2	0	0	0	0
127	Roy Liston	1921–1922, 1924	18	2	8	0	22
128	Bill Lucas	1921–1922	24	3	0	0	9
129	Tom McGuinness	1921–1922	10	1	0	0	3
130	Henry Pidcock	1921–1922	15	3	0	0	9
131	Joe Thetheway	1922	3	0	0	0	0
132	Billy Craig	1922–1925	40	11	0	0	33
133	Frank O'Rourke	1922	1	0	0	0	0
134	Sid Peters	1922	2	0	0	0	0
135	Syd Greenless	1922–1923	10	0	0	0	0
136	Dud Millard	1922–1926	48	13	1	0	41
137	William Coonan	1922–1923	9	2	0	0	6
138	Charles York	1922–1927	4	2	0	0	6
139	Des Ponchard	1922–1929	58	1	38	0	79
140	E.B. Cox	1922	2	1	0	0	3
141	Charles Cuneo	1923	10	1	1	0	5
142	Les Hayes	1923–1926	45	7	0	0	21
143	Tommy Kennedy	1923–1926	35	24	0	0	72
144	S Bell	1923	1	1	0	0	3
145	George Bishop	1923–1935	81	10	22	0	74
146	G O'Halloran	1924	3	0	0	0	0
147	Fred Ferguson	1924–1927	28	1	0	0	3
148	Norm Robinson	1924–1933	72	19	22	0	101
149	Jack Cuneen	1925	10	0	0	0	0
150	Ray Elliott	1925–1929	58	7	0	0	21
151	Frank McMillan	1925	12	0	17	0	34
152	A Latta	1925–1926	14	2	0	0	6
153	T Slattery	1925	8	0	0	0	0
154	C Bell	1925	2	0	0	0	0
155	Jack Dawson	1926	5	0	0	0	0
156	Bill Maizey	1926–1927	27	3	17	0	43
157	R Rue	1926–1927	7	1	0	0	3
158	F Ross	1926	7	2	0	0	6
159	Tony Russell	1926–1929	39	10	10	0	50
160	A Nicholls	1926	3	0	0	0	0
161	T Newby	1926	3	0	0	0	0
162	W O'Shea	1926	4	0	7	0	14
163	Bill Wiggins	1926–1929	39	2	0	0	6
164	Leo Abberton	1926	2	0	0	0	0
165	J Reeves	1926	7	1	0	0	3
166	Arthur Tennant	1926–1929	19	0	0	0	0
167	Alfred Wincote	1926–1929	28	3	0	0	9
168	J Cairns	1926–1928	10	1	0	0	3
169	Reg Snowball	1926	1	0	0	0	0
170	J O'Connell	1926	6	3	0	0	9
171	J Goodwin	1927–1931	5	0	8	0	16
172	Charlie Roberts	1927–1933	59	20	15	0	90
173	C Wellings	1927	3	0	0	0	0
174	Anthony McFadden	1927–1929	30	1	30	0	63
175	Walter McGreal	1927	7	0	0	0	0
176	Les Moore	1927–1931	44	10	0	0	30
177	Wal Maizey	1927–1931	42	8	0	0	24
178	H Rolfe	1927	1	0	0	0	0
179	Gordon Robinson	1928–1929	4	0	0	0	0
180	Dudley Fitzpatrick	1927–1929	17	6	0	0	18
181	T Barnes	1927	1	0	0	0	0
182	F O'Brien	1928–1929	12	6	0	0	18
183	Jim Pritchard	1928–1931	25	5	15	0	45
184	T Spooner	1928	3	1	0	0	3
185	Andy Nicol	1928–1932	19	1	0	0	3
186	Jim Duckworth	1928–1938	45	14	33	0	108
187	J Randall	1928	1	0	0	0	0
188	Gerald Fitzpatrick	1928–1933	2	0	0	0	0
189	Vern Deacon	1929	14	8	0	0	24
190	F Matthews	1929	10	0	0	0	0
191	Vic Reeves	1929–1931	28	2	0	0	6
192	Jack Chin	1929–1930	11	3	14	0	37
193	Jack Folkard	1929–1930	10	0	5	0	10
194	Ron Hoyle	1929	1	0	0	0	0
195	Doug Vannon	1929	3	1	2	0	7
196	S Edmonds	1929	1	0	0	0	0
197	George Frankland	1929–1936	76	27	0	0	81
198	Tom Magnus	1929–1933	15	3	1	0	11
199	R Brennan	1929	2	1	0	0	3
200	H Robson	1929	1	0	0	0	0
201	Syd Christensen	1930–1937	63	42	185	0	496
202	Cec Fifield	1930	5	0	0	0	0
203	S Martin	1930–1932	27	3	0	0	9
204	George Mullins	1930–1932	13	3	4	0	17
205	Charlie Richards	1930–1940	64	4	0	0	12
206	Stan Donegan	1930	5	4	0	0	12
207	Alby Black	1930–1931	24	11	0	0	33
208	Mal Fallon	1930–1934	53	9	32	0	91
209	John Alleyne	1930–1931	12	9	4	0	35
210	G Algie	1930	4	1	0	0	3
211	Lionel Matchett	1930	1	0	0	0	0
212	Stan Simpson	1930–1934	20	3	2	0	13
213	S Hellyer	1930–1931	3	0	0	0	0
214	George Beaman	1931	4	4	0	0	12
215	James McMenamin	1931	13	3	0	0	9
216	Arthur Toby	1931–1933	41	3	0	0	9
217	S Lever	1931	1	0	0	0	0
218	Arthur Roberts	1931–1934	28	1	0	0	3
219	Harold Matthews	1931–1934	24	3	0	0	9
220	Horrie Balkwell	1931–1932	13	0	0	0	0
221	Dan Little	1931–1938	18	7	0	0	21
222	J O'Dowd	1931–1933	19	8	0	0	24
223	E Fulham	1931–1932	17	2	0	0	6
224	J Stapleton	1931	8	1	2	0	7
225	J Ricketts	1931	1	0	0	0	0
226	C De Valle	1932	4	0	0	0	0
227	T Cox	1932–1934	6	2	0	0	6
228	Ben Weber	1932	2	0	0	0	0
229	L Hanratty	1932	1	0	0	0	0
230	Billy Johnson	1932–1941	106	16	69	0	186
231	R Serio	1932	3	0	0	0	0
232	Michael Pace	1932–1935	41	5	0	0	15
233	Edmund Beaver	1932–1937	60	4	0	0	12
234	Harry Lapham	1932	1	0	0	0	0
235	Charlie Morris	1932	5	2	0	0	6
236	D Simpson	1933	6	1	0	0	3
237	Lex Small	1933	5	1	0	0	3
238	Les Trussler	1933	6	0	0	0	0
239	Bill Williams	1933–1935	31	6	0	0	18
240	F Parker	1933	5	1	0	0	3
241	Joe Sharp	1933	3	0	0	0	0
242	Bill Ballard	1933–1937	31	3	0	0	9
243	Sid Goodwin	1933—1942	118	86	2	0	262
244	Len Rue	1933–1934	11	3	0	0	9
245	Tom Grahame	1934–1936	29	9	0	0	27
246	J Tattersall	1934	11	0	0	0	0
247	G Thompson	1934–1936	6	2	0	0	6
248	J Dorman	1934	1	0	0	0	0
249	M Murden	1934	1	0	0	0	0
250	Pat Barry	1934–1935	12	2	0	0	6
251	Jack Pidcock	1934–1938	13	4	0	0	12
252	Francis Horth	1934	2	3	0	0	9
253	Joe Busch	1935–1936	19	9	0	0	27
254	Stephen Cooper	1935	8	1	0	0	3
255	Jack Redman	1935–1940	77	41	0	0	123
256	Gordon Sykes	1935–1938	13	2	0	0	6
257	Herbert Woodbry	1935	12	0	2	0	4
258	Norm Cox	1935–1936	18	1	0	0	3
259	Bill Alexander	1935–1937	25	2	0	0	6
260	Gus Reeves	1935–1936	13	8	0	0	24
261	H Wright	1935–1937	3	2	0	0	6
262	Ernie Latta	1935	2	0	0	0	0
263	Frank Griffiths	1935–1941	56	8	0	0	24
264	Harry Southcombe	1935	2	0	0	0	0
265	Jack Patterson	1935—1936	2	0	0	0	0
266	Maurice Fitzgerald	1936	3	1	0	0	3
267	Dave Manning	1936–1939	52	1	0	0	3
268	Frank Johnston	1936–1940	41	4	40	0	92
269	Roy Palmer	1936	12	1	0	0	3
270	Dave Colless	1936	6	3	0	0	9
271	Eddie Lockhart	1936–1937	7	0	0	0	0
272	Billy Bischoff Sr.	1937–1940	36	3	0	0	9
273	Stan Cowie	1937	4	0	0	0	0
274	Jack Gorman	1937–1938	13	4	0	0	12
275	Arthur Patton	1937—1948	117	95	9	0	303
276	Greg Toner	1937	3	1	1	0	5
277	Jack Caplice	1937	5	2	0	0	6
278	Joe Acheson	1937	3	0	0	0	0
279	Frank Gilmore	1937	1	0	0	0	0
280	Frank Hyde	1938–1941	38	16	2	0	52
281	Charles McKay	1938	7	0	0	0	0
282	Jim Quealey	1938–1945	58	13	46	0	131
283	Jack Winchester	1938—1944	58	15	0	0	45
284	L Knight	1938	1	0	0	0	0
285	Darcy Kearney	1938–1940	18	6	0	0	18
286	Dawson Buckley	1938—1947	113	20	3	0	66
287	Cliff McDonald	1938	4	5	1	0	17
288	George Watt	1938—1944	73	9	2	0	31
289	George Barr	1938	3	0	0	0	0
290	William Brown	1938–1939	2	0	0	0	0
291	M Chin	1938	1	0	0	0	0
292	Hec Day	1939–1943	38	4	21	0	54
293	Jack McVicar	1939	10	2	0	0	6
294	Athol Smith	1939—1945	92	29	0	0	87
295	Tom Bourke	1939–1948	147	47	76	0	293
296	Colin Fitzpatrick	1940	5	0	0	0	0
297	T Rowe	1940	1	0	0	0	0
298	John Rees	1940–1941	11	2	0	0	6
299	A Bowery	1940–1941	21	4	0	0	12
300	Jack Hampstead	1940–1950	112	30	1	0	92
301	Frank McNally	1940	1	0	0	0	0
302	H Wasson	1940	1	0	0	0	0
303	Henry Box	1941–1946	45	4	0	0	12
304	Johnny Brown	1941–1943	5	0	0	0	0
305	C Foster	1941	5	1	0	0	3
306	Frank Schultz	1941–1943	4	0	0	0	0
307	J Kinnard	1941–1942	10	0	0	0	0
308	Frank Tuffy	1941	7	0	0	0	0
309	George Wise	1941–1942	3	0	0	0	0
310	Doug Dobson	1941–1942	10	0	2	0	4
311	K Murphy	1941–1945	17	3	0	0	9
312	Fred de Belin	1942–1950	75	13	1	0	41
313	Ralph Ross	1942	5	0	0	0	0
314	Frank Dreise	1942–1944	30	14	40	0	122
315	Oliver Duckworth	1942	1	0	0	0	0
316	A Johnson	1942	1	0	0	0	3
317	Ray Miranda	1942	1	0	0	0	0
318	Des Stapleton	1942–1947	17	3	4	0	17
319	Johnny Bliss	1942–1943	14	10	0	0	30
320	Joe Leo	1942	3	0	0	0	0
321	Jack Spencer	1942–1951	149	26	2	0	82
322	George Endycott	1942–1943	7	0	5	0	10
323	E.W. Bennett	1943	12	0	1	0	2
324	Merv Denton	1943	12	5	8	0	31
325	T Freney	1943–1945	17	1	0	0	3
326	Jack Danzey Sr.	1943–1944	11	1	0	0	3
327	Sid Ryan	1943–1951	104	5	0	0	15
328	Charlie Millar	1943–1946	16	0	13	1	28
329	Abe Hall	1943	4	0	2	0	4
330	Bob Patterson	1943–1948	19	15	0	0	45
331	Stan Ponchard	1943–1953	106	46	13	0	164
332	J Hayes	1944	1	0	0	0	0
333	Dave Parkinson	1944–1948	53	7	1	0	23
334	Joe Jorgenson	1944–1953	95	22	334	0	734
335	Keith Parkinson	1944–1948	39	23	1	0	71
336	Colin Campbell	1944–1946	10	0	0	0	0
337	Pat Devery	1944–1947	38	25	59	0	193
338	Harry Leo	1945–1949	17	10	0	0	30
339	Ted McGovern	1945–1947	7	0	0	0	0
340	G Stokes	1945	1	0	0	0	0
341	Jack Metcalf	1945–1946	21	1	0	0	3
342	Hilton Kidd	1945–1948	27	2	0	0	6
343	Lionel Quigley	1945	4	0	0	0	0
344	Mitchell Wallace	1945–1948	13	5	0	0	15
345	D Thomas	1945	3	0	0	0	0
346	Bob Nielson	1945–1946	13	7	1	0	23
347	Ted Dawes	1945–1951	6	1	0	0	3
348	Harry Bath	1946–1947	30	11	0	0	33
349	Herb Gilbert Jr.	1946–1948	45	0	2	0	4
350	K Burton	1946	1	1	0	0	3
351	George Williams	1946–1951	48	20	1	0	6
352	W.D. Kelly	1946–1950	7	0	6	0	12
353	Jack McCullough	1946–1950	34	0	4	0	8
354	Bob Lulham	1947–1953	85	85	45	0	345
355	Jack Russell	1947	12	0	0	0	0
356	Bruce Smith	1947	5	0	0	0	0
357	V McLennan	1947	5	0	0	0	0
358	Ted Kealy	1947	3	4	0	0	12
359	Des Bryan	1947–1948	16	5	0	0	15
360	Jack Clare	1947	1	0	0	0	0
361	John Brannigan	1947	8	0	0	0	0
362	Arthur Kilmurray	1948	2	0	0	0	0
363	Jim Thomson	1948–1953	86	9	0	0	27
364	Ken Stephen	1948	3	0	0	0	0
365	Bob Crane	1948	16	0	0	0	0
366	Tom Lawler	1948–1954	57	8	0	0	24
367	Gene Barakat	1948	1	0	0	0	0
368	Leo Nosworthy	1948–1952	64	27	0	0	81
369	William Sneddon	1948–1949	21	2	0	0	6
370	Fred Brown	1949	8	0	3	0	6
371	John Campbell	1949–1954	37	4	0	0	12
372	Ken Fogarty	1949–1950	39	2	0	0	6
373	Bill Stewart	1949	1	0	0	0	0
374	R Robinson	1949	1	0	0	0	0
375	Jack Davis	1949–1954	36	3	64	0	137
376	Harold Gwyer	1949–1951	28	13	0	0	39
377	Kevin Harmey	1949–1950	29	14	1	0	44
378	Russ Smith	1949–1951	12	4	0	0	12
379	B Long	1949	1	0	0	0	0
380	Fred Fayers	1950	15	1	0	0	3
381	Bruce Hopkins	1950—1951	25	2	3	0	12
382	Bill Marsh	1950–1955, 1957–1960	142	30	2	0	94
383	Tom Tyrrell	1950–1954	52	6	0	0	18
384	Jack Scanlon	1950–1952	21	2	5	0	16
385	Jack Fifield	1950–1955	57	30	31	0	152
386	Ray Lees	1950–1954	32	4	1	0	14
387	Ron Battye	1951–1955	17	4	0	0	12
388	Jack McIntosh	1951	4	1	0	0	3
389	Ernie Church	1951–1952	13	4	0	0	12
390	Pat Hyde	1951–1953	20	5	0	0	15
391	Ron Graham	1951–1952	10	0	0	0	0
392	Jim Scott	1951	8	0	0	0	0
393	Ron Daley	1951–1955	47	7	0	0	21
394	Geoff Fallon	1951	2	0	0	0	0
395	J Doyle	1951	1	0	0	0	0
396	Terry Brogan	1951–1955	14	0	0	0	0
397	Roy Dykes	1951–1953	22	3	0	0	9
398	Jack Moon	1951–1956	56	9	0	0	27
399	Johnny O'Brien	1951–1958	31	0	0	0	0
400	Merv Williams	1951	5	1	0	0	3
401	Peter New	1951–1953	3	3	0	0	9
402	D Foss	1951	1	0	0	0	0
403	Bob Moon	1951—1952	3	0	0	0	0
404	R Sutton	1951–1952	3	0	0	0	0
405	Ray Laurie	1952	14	7	20	0	61
406	J McGarry	1952	4	0	0	0	0
407	Alf Roach	1952–1953	18	6	1	0	20
408	Neville Watt	1952–1959	104	16	39	0	126
409	Jack Williams	1952–1953	12	6	0	0	18
410	Colin de Lore	1953	16	3	0	0	9
411	Des Horne	1953–1958	29	25	0	0	75
412	Kevin Humphreys	1953–1956	43	9	0	0	27
413	Bob Lawrence	1953	9	1	0	0	3
414	Barry Willis	1953–1956	21	4	0	0	12
415	Cec Fitzsimmons	1953–1954	6	2	0	0	6
416	Jack Harrison	1953–1954	3	1	0	0	3
417	Bob Crichton	1953–1955	27	4	0	0	12
418	George Fifield	1953–1957	42	32	29	0	154
419	Jack Hardman	1953	1	0	0	0	0
420	Clarrie Jeffreys	1953–1955	23	2	0	0	6
421	Ted Bonser	1953–1955	20	8	0	0	24
422	John Mackenzie	1953–1954	23	4	0	0	12
423	Ray McFarlane	1953–1955	10	0	21	0	42
424	Ron Proudfoot	1953–1958	31	1	0	0	3
425	N Jones	1953	3	0	0	0	0
426	J Robinson	1953	2	0	0	0	0
427	Bill Garvin	1954	14	3	0	0	9
428	Kevin Honeybrook	1954	4	0	0	0	0
429	Johnny Johnston	1954	2	0	0	0	0
430	Les Gelfius	1954–1956	24	15	0	0	45
431	Geoff Lee	1954	2	0	0	0	0
432	Keith Barnes	1955–1968	194	11	742	1	1519
433	Geoff Hawkey	1955–1958	56	16	0	0	48
434	Brian Staunton	1955–1958	65	23	0	0	69
435	Terry McGovern	1955–1956	28	16	0	0	48
436	Don Sinclair	1955	17	0	0	0	0
437	Danny Johnston	1955–1958	44	6	0	0	18
438	Noel Ryan	1955	1	0	0	0	0
439	Graeme O'Donnell	1955–1957	3	1	0	0	3
440	Don Kerr	1955	1	0	0	0	0
441	Don Solah	1955	2	1	0	0	3
442	Norm Swain	1955–1956	2	2	0	0	6
443	Maurie Griffiths	1955–1956	3	2	3	0	12
444	Peter Meredith	1955	1	0	0	0	0
445	Bill Frame	1956	5	0	0	0	0
446	Gus Gray	1956	21	1	0	0	3
447	Robert Heaney	1956–1957	23	2	0	0	6
448	Bill Harris	1956	15	5	3	0	21
449	Brian Jeffrey	1956	1	0	0	0	0
450	Ron Moses	1956–1959	23	2	0	0	6
451	Kevin Mosman	1956–1957	33	14	0	0	42
452	Ron Potter	1956–1957	32	4	0	0	12
453	Arthur Lorimer	1956–1958	43	12	5	0	46
454	Keith Agget	1956	1	0	0	0	0
455	Jack Alleyne	1956–1958	10	4	0	0	12
456	Alan Mason	1956–1962	73	5	0	0	15
457	Ron Clifford	1956–1960	24	4	27	0	66
458	Paul Broughton	1957	1	0	0	0	0
459	Kevin Smyth	1957–1960	58	13	0	0	39
460	Bob Boland	1957–1967	157	11	0	1	35
461	Geoff Wilkin	1957	5	0	0	0	0
462	Joe Keighran	1957–1959	27	1	0	0	3
463	Billy Bischoff Jr.	1957–1965	151	34	0	0	102
464	Ken Bray	1957	2	2	0	0	4
465	Ron Warnes	1957	7	1	26	0	55
466	Ray Swanson	1957–1959	17	1	0	0	3
467	Jack Sinclair	1957–1960	46	6	0	0	18
468	Tommy McManus	1957–1959	3	0	0	0	0
469	Don Amos	1957–1961	25	0	0	0	0
470	Eric Barnett	1958	3	1	2	0	7
471	Graham Jones	1958–1959	7	2	0	0	6
472	Bill Tonkin	1958–1959	26	2	5	0	19
473	Frank Drake	1958	11	5	0	0	15
474	Carl Rumph	1958	14	1	0	0	3
475	Richard Richards	1958	1	0	0	0	0
476	Ron Mack	1959–1963	77	47	0	0	141
477	Harry Raven	1959—1965	104	9	0	0	27
478	Brian Tranter	1959	5	0	0	0	0
479	Jimmy Garvin	1959–1960	6	1	0	0	3
480	Ian McCarthy	1959	11	0	0	0	0
481	Don Evenden	1959–1960	9	1	0	0	3
482	Pat Hoggard	1959	3	0	2	0	4
483	Bob Barrett	1959–1963	19	2	23	0	52
484	Bob Mara	1959–1967	141	70	2	0	214
485	John Mullins	1959–1962	14	4	13	0	38
486	Doug Walton	1959–1962	25	2	0	0	6
487	Frank Connolly	1959	1	0	0	0	0
488	Jack Jones	1959	3	0	0	0	0
489	Laurie Fagan	1959–1966	98	19	22	0	101
490	Brian Henderson	1960–1961	28	1	0	0	3
491	Andy Thomson	1960	4	0	0	0	0
492	Col Glover	1960	5	0	0	0	0
493	Greg Hay	1960–1964	13	1	0	0	3
494	Dick Wilson	1960–1966	69	4	15	0	42
495	Brian Brailey	1960–1962	14	1	0	0	3
496	Gordon Goldsmith	1960–1961	9	1	0	0	3
497	Bob Hensby	1960–1962	14	1	0	0	3
498	George Piper	1960–1966	65	10	0	0	30
499	Jock Delaney	1960	2	1	0	0	3
500	Bede Goff	1961	18	0	0	0	0
501	Terry O'Sullivan	1961	1	0	0	0	0
502	Rex Percy	1961–1963	26	3	8	0	25
503	Peter Provan	1961–1969	155	12	0	0	36
504	Dick Quinn	1961–1965	49	18	0	0	54
505	Ken Aitken	1961	1	0	0	0	0
506	Tom Cooper	1961	1	0	5	0	10
507	Jack Ragen	1961	1	0	2	0	4
508	Gil MacDougall	1961	7	4	0	0	12
509	Col Sandercock	1961–1965	15	2	0	0	6
510	Fred Booth	1962	7	1	0	0	3
511	Jack Danzey Jr.	1962–1965	48	4	17	0	46
512	Ian Fearnley	1962	11	0	0	0	0
513	Ian Foye	1962–1964	14	0	0	0	0
514	Ian Hay	1962	2	0	0	0	0
515	Graeme Ferguson	1962–1963	8	0	0	0	0
516	Ron Cooper	1962	4	0	1	0	2
517	Bob Ridley	1962–1965	38	7	0	0	21
518	Harry Marcellos	1962	4	0	0	0	0
519	Frank McGarry	1962–1963	10	2	0	0	6
520	Kevin Cox	1962	2	0	0	0	0
521	Ted Allard	1962	2	1	0	0	3
522	Dave Cooper	1962–1966	19	0	0	0	0
523	Brian Dunlop	1963–1965	33	9	0	0	27
524	Garry Leo	1963–1974	173	29	0	1	89
525	Frank Clegg	1963	1	0	0	0	0
526	B Connors	1963	2	0	0	0	0
527	Gerry McGarry	1963	1	0	0	0	0
528	Hal Browne	1964–1970	73	25	3	0	81
529	Ron Clothier	1964—1968	26	5	0	0	15
530	Norm Henderson	1964–1967	21	1	0	0	3
531	Peter Jones	1964–1970	74	10	0	0	30
532	Peter Kelly	1964	9	0	23	0	46
533	Dennis Tutty	1964–1971, 1976	98	9	0	0	27
534	Doug Moore	1964	7	0	0	0	0
535	Ken Noble	1964	7	0	0	0	0
536	Robert Browne	1964	1	0	0	0	0
537	Martin Barnes	1965	4	1	0	0	3
538	Dave Bolton	1965–1970	78	5	7	21	71
539	Geoff Connell	1965–1971	30	1	0	0	3
540	John Gilligan	1965–1969	5	0	0	0	0
541	Bob Grant	1965	5	0	0	0	0
542	Brian Sullivan	1965–1967	7	2	0	0	6
543	Ray Westwood	1965	3	0	0	0	0
544	Arthur Beetson	1966–1970	74	6	1	0	20
545	Paul Cross	1966–1974	94	50	0	0	150
546	Kevin Yow Yeh	1966–1967	41	9	0	0	27
547	Kevin Gentles	1966	2	0	0	0	0
548	Jim Bonus	1966–1967	7	0	6	0	12
549	Laurie Moraschi	1966–1968	34	1	0	0	3
550	Sid Williams	1966–1970	59	13	26	0	91
551	John Spencer	1966–1975	161	58	1	5	185
552	Michael Ross	1966–1973	40	9	18	0	63
553	John McCarthy	1966—1969	3	0	0	1	2
554	Peter Davies	1967	2	0	0	0	0
555	Len Killeen	1967–1971	78	36	270	8	664
556	Norm Miller	1967–1969	34	0	0	0	0
557	George Ruebner	1967–1971	58	33	18	1	137
558	Allan Fitzgibbon	1968–1970	42	7	0	0	21
559	Greg Fryer	1968–1974	84	18	2	2	61
560	Keith Outten	1968–1971, 1975	83	14	2	3	52
561	Terry Parker	1968–1973	57	17	0	0	51
562	Ritchie Davies	1968	6	0	0	0	0
563	Malcolm Moss	1968	6	0	0	0	0
564	Jim Bragg	1968	4	2	0	0	6
565	John Crawford	1968–1969	23	1	0	0	3
566	Greg Christensen	1968	1	0	0	0	0
567	Peter Boulton	1969–1975	95	2	0	0	6
568	Peter Fardell	1969–1971	28	1	0	0	3
569	Kevin Bowrey	1969–1970	8	1	0	0	3
570	Barry McTaggart	1969–1972	59	5	0	0	15
571	Olaf Prattl	1969–1971	49	9	0	0	27
572	Robert Smithies	1969–1971	58	14	2	0	46
573	Joe Walsh	1969–1973	53	2	0	0	6
574	Phillip Carey	1969–1972	11	0	0	0	0
575	Ern Clingan	1969	1	0	0	0	0
576	Vic Querin	1969–1973	23	2	0	0	6
577	Darryl Palmer	1970–1972	13	2	0	0	6
578	Wayne Thomson	1970–1972	15	2	8	0	22
579	Terry Cross	1971–1974	31	4	0	0	12
580	Graham Mayhew	1971–1972	12	1	0	0	3
581	Ron Palmer	1971–1975	10	0	0	0	0
582	Geoff Starling	1971–1974	65	22	5	0	76
583	Steve Satterly	1971	9	1	28	0	59
584	Alan Tilbrook	1971–1975	30	1	0	0	3
585	George Fallon	1971	2	0	0	0	0
586	Ron Loomes	1971–1973	13	3	0	0	9
587	Ron Leis	1971–1974	7	1	6	0	15
588	Bruce Finn	1971–1973	3	0	0	0	0
589	Peter Handcock	1971	1	0	0	0	0
590	Ray Black	1972–1974	10	3	0	0	9
591	Bob Bolin	1972–1973	22	3	0	0	9
592	Glenn Capelin	1972–1974	45	19	0	0	57
593	Dick Jeffrey	1972–1973	23	0	0	0	0
594	Mal McMartin	1972–1973	15	2	0	0	6
595	Tim Murphy	1972–1974	58	12	0	0	36
596	Jeff Shield	1972–1976	71	11	0	0	33
597	Dennis Preston	1972	10	1	33	0	69
598	Russell Worth	1972	11	2	0	2	8
599	Mick Dryden	1972	1	0	0	0	0
600	Trevor Ryan	1972–1977, 1982	159	30	1	0	92
601	Bruce Warwick	1972	6	1	18	0	39
602	Bruce Doust	1973–1974	25	2	0	0	6
603	Peter Duffy	1973–1980	28	2	1	0	8
604	Dennis Carter	1973–1974	7	0	0	0	0
605	Phil Moase	1973–1976	21	3	0	0	9
606	Mark Tonks	1973–1974	23	4	57	0	126
607	Des Bonner	1973–1982	28	1	0	0	3
608	Alan Burke	1973–1974	7	0	0	0	0
609	Geoff Dell	1973	2	0	0	0	0
610	Peter Kachel	1973	2	0	0	0	0
611	Mark Levy	1974–1975	28	5	4	0	23
612	Dennis Manteit	1974—1976	35	7	0	0	21
613	Merv Muggleton	1974–1978	39	11	11	0	55
614	Noel Maybury	1974–1978	56	4	0	0	12
615	Paul Sommerville	1974–1975	18	3	0	0	9
616	Jim Fiddler	1974	15	1	40	0	83
617	Trevor Forwood	1974–1977	25	7	17	0	55
618	Frank Ragen	1974–1976	19	9	0	0	27
619	Phil Heggen	1974	1	0	0	0	0
620	Alan Lennon	1974	1	0	0	0	0
621	Steve Smith	1974–1976	12	1	0	0	3
622	Mike Fish	1974–1980	90	30	4	0	98
623	Keith Cook	1975–1978	56	2	38	0	82
624	Steve Lavers	1975–1982	93	3	0	0	9
625	Allan McMahon	1975–1981	110	28	10	0	104
626	Neil Pringle	1975–1982	122	28	0	0	84
627	Graham Roberts	1975–1976	24	5	43	0	101
628	Albert Tabone	1975	1	0	0	0	0
629	Warren Evans	1975	7	0	0	0	0
630	Brian Lockwood	1975–1977	46	2	0	0	6
631	Jeff Brian	1975	9	1	18	0	39
632	John Cunningham	1975	5	1	5	1	14
633	Wayne Grogan	1975	1	0	0	0	0
634	Alan Rhoades	1975	1	0	0	0	0
635	Gary Thomson	1975	1	0	0	0	0
636	Greg Bandiera	1976–1977	26	2	0	0	6
637	Dave Edwards	1976–1978	34	2	0	0	6
638	Stephen Knight	1976–1977	37	14	0	0	32
639	Arthur Mountier	1976–1977	27	2	0	0	6
640	Greg Cox	1976–1977	44	8	130	0	284
641	Gerard Crowe	1976, 1980–1981	14	0	0	0	0
642	Dennis Bendall	1976–1979	68	24	0	0	72
643	Mark Beaven	1976–1978	5	0	0	0	0
644	Col Gorton	1976	4	1	0	0	3
645	Brendan Mockford	1976	1	0	0	0	0
646	Wayne Wigham	1976–1983	135	56	0	0	169
647	Steve Frewin	1976–1979	16	0	0	0	0
648	Bill Cloughessy	1976	1	0	0	0	0
649	Warren Boland	1976–1978	22	2	0	0	6
650	Gary Spears	1977–1982	71	2	0	0	6
651	David Topliss	1977	2	1	0	0	3
652	Neil McDowell	1977	7	1	0	0	3
653	Col Ensor	1977	1	0	0	0	0
654	Peter Ninness	1977–1979	24	3	27	0	63
655	Larry Corowa	1978–1983	98	64	0	0	199
656	David Grant	1978–1981	50	8	0	0	24
657	Frank Marino	1978–1980	13	0	0	0	0
658	Wayne Miranda	1978–1983	91	12	252	0	541
659	Geoff Naylor	1978–1979	38	4	0	0	12
660	Phil Schaefer	1978–1982	37	12	0	0	36
661	Lloyd Martin	1978–1981	30	8	0	0	24
662	Bill Hilliard	1978–1982	14	0	0	0	0
663	Percy Knight	1978–1982	64	11	0	0	33
664	Guy Tully	1978	3	0	0	0	0
665	Bob Paton	1978	2	0	0	0	0
666	Mick Liubinskas	1979	2	0	0	0	0
667	Rod Morris	1979–1981	56	4	0	0	12
668	Greg Oliphant	1979–1980	27	2	0	0	6
669	Gary Webster	1979–1982	37	3	0	0	9
670	Gary Day	1979	1	0	0	0	0
671	Neil Whittaker	1979–1985	118	11	0	1	34
672	Steve Kerr	1979–1982	19	4	23	0	58
673	Lindsay Delpech	1979–1980	2	0	0	0	0
674	Gary Thompson	1979	3	0	0	0	0
675	John Muggleton	1979	6	1	0	0	3
676	Tom Gillogly	1979	2	0	1	0	2
677	Mark Lawson	1979–1984	56	11	0	0	41
678	Olsen Filipaina	1980–1984	81	19	83	0	225
679	Kerry Hemsley	1980–1988	139	3	0	0	11
680	Wayne Pearce	1980–1990	192	33	0	0	123
681	Ron Pilon	1980–1981	28	3	0	0	9
682	Lance Thompson	1980	3	0	0	0	0
683	David Adams	1980	2	1	0	0	3
684	John Bilbija	1980–1981	4	1	0	0	3
685	John Davidson	1980–1988	168	60	22	0	272
686	Paul Morris	1980	2	0	0	0	0
687	Wayne Innes	1980–1982	9	3	0	0	9
688	Mal Creevey	1981	6	1	0	0	3
689	Craig Clarke	1981	1	0	0	0	0
690	Peter Grounds	1981–1982, 1986	16	1	0	0	3
691	John Sparks	1981	6	1	0	0	6
692	Ian Thomson	1981	9	0	0	0	0
693	Bill Kain	1981–1986	43	5	0	0	19
694	John Owens	1981–1988	56	3	0	0	12
695	Gary Bridge	1982–1986	104	32	1	0	122
696	Steve Martin	1982–1984	53	10	0	1	38
697	Terry Regan	1982	19	4	0	0	12
698	Gary Mara	1982	1	0	0	0	0
699	Garry Jack	1982–1992, 1995	244	60	1	1	239
700	Kevin Hardwick	1982–1990	145	9	1	0	36
701	Greg Lane	1982–1984	37	8	0	0	32
702	Scott Rigney	1982	1	1	0	0	3
703	Steve Roach	1982–1992	185	12	0	0	48
704	Michael Schofield	1982–1984	32	1	0	0	4
705	Benny Elias	1982–1994	232	36	4	33	181
706	Simon Booth	1983–1984	25	5	0	0	20
707	David Brooks	1983–1992	173	14	108	1	273
708	Tony Keevill	1983	8	1	0	0	4
709	James Bell	1983–1985	5	0	0	0	0
710	Bruce Gall	1983–1984	11	1	0	0	4
711	Michael Marketo	1983–1987	53	3	0	0	12
712	Ron Ryan	1983–1986	32	9	0	0	36
713	Stephen Humphreys	1983–1987	41	12	0	0	48
714	Jamie Davidson	1983–1987	26	3	0	0	12
715	David French	1984	9	0	0	0	0
716	Paul Beaven	1984–1988	40	8	0	0	32
717	Steve Massey	1984	2	0	0	0	0
718	Paul Clarke	1984–1989	64	1	0	0	4
719	Tony Elias	1984	1	0	0	0	0
720	Gavin Hanrahan	1984–1987	35	7	0	0	28
721	Ross Conlon	1985–1988	98	15	348	0	756
722	Scott Gale	1985–1988	99	35	0	3	143
723	Russel Gartner	1985–1989	99	26	0	0	116
723a	Brett Davidson	1985	2	0	0	0	0
724	Bruce Parnell	1985	1	0	0	0	0
725	Rod Pethybridge	1985	6	2	0	0	8
726	Garry Schofield	1985–1987	47	28	9	4	134
727	Brett McClure	1985	1	0	0	0	0
728	Paul Sironen	1985–1998	246	22	0	0	88
729	Michael Campbell	1985–1987	9	1	1	0	6
730	Paul McCabe	1986	8	0	0	0	0
731	Bruce McGuire	1986–1990	83	6	0	0	24
732	Glenn Stanton	1986–1988	4	0	0	0	0
733	Tony Myler	1986	12	1	0	0	4
734	Michael Perry	1986	7	0	0	0	0
735	Bruce Sinclair	1986–1988	13	0	0	0	0
736	Peter Camroux	1987	10	0	0	0	0
737	Mick Neil	1987–1991, 1994	97	17	0	0	68
738	Matt Carter	1987	6	2	0	0	8
739	Phil Sigsworth	1987	9	2	0	0	8
740	Paul Daley	1987	1	0	0	0	0
741	Lee Crooks	1987	11	0	7	0	14
742	Clint Robinson	1987–1992	52	19	0	0	76
743	Peter Davies	1987	6	3	0	0	12
744	Patrick Crown	1987	1	0	0	0	0
745	Graham Pearce	1987	1	0	0	0	0
746	Paul McInerney	1987	1	0	0	0	0
747	Gary Freeman	1988–1991	51	19	0	0	76
748	Matt Parish	1988–1993	55	6	0	0	24
749	Michael Pobjie	1988–1990	37	5	0	0	20
750	David Rowles	1988	5	0	0	0	0
751	Steve Edmed	1988–1995	136	5	0	0	20
752	Damien McGarry	1988–1990	15	9	0	0	36
753	Michael Moss	1988–1990	15	3	0	0	12
754	Steve Benkic	1988–1990	18	1	0	0	4
755	Daryl Powell	1988	4	2	0	0	8
756	Wayne Sing	1988–1991	14	0	0	0	0
757	Ellery Hanley	1988, 1996–1997	34	8	0	1	33
758	Tony Chalmers	1989–1990	16	3	0	0	12
759	James Grant	1989–1992	65	30	3	0	126
760	Steve O'Brien	1989–1992	58	16	6	0	64
761	Tim Brasher	1989–1997	185	82	105	0	538
762	Craig Sloane	1989–1991	10	1	0	0	4
763	Gary McFarlane	1989–1993	45	5	0	0	20
764	Shaun Edwards	1989	12	1	0	0	4
765	Grant Muscat	1989	1	0	0	0	0
766	Bill Rule	1989	1	0	0	0	0
767	Andy Currier	1989–1990	22	10	68	0	176
768	Doug Delaney	1989	2	0	0	0	0
769	John Elias	1989–1992, 1994	67	7	0	0	28
770	Ian McCann	1989–1992	32	5	17	0	54
771	Peter Phillips	1990–1992	17	0	0	0	0
772	Paul Upfield	1990–1991	7	1	0	0	4
773	Michael Brown	1990–1996	56	9	0	0	36
774	Mark Afflick	1990–1992	13	0	0	0	0
775	Will Robinson	1990–1994	62	27	2	0	112
776	David Anderson	1991	12	1	0	0	4
777	David Bayssari	1991–1997	93	14	35	1	126
778	Cameron Douglas	1991	5	0	0	0	0
779	Craig Izzard	1991	8	0	0	0	0
780	Brian Smith	1991–1993	37	6	84	6	198
781	Perry Smith	1991	2	0	0	0	0
782	Martin Masella	1991–1994	71	3	0	0	12
783	Shane O'Grady	1991–1992	16	1	0	0	4
784	Jacin Sinclair	1991–1993, 1998–1999	45	5	0	1	21
785	George Doumitt	1991–1993	6	0	0	0	0
786	John Mulvihill	1991–1992	4	0	0	0	0
787	Matt Munro	1992–1995	60	5	0	0	20
788	Paul Davis	1992–1993	40	10	11	0	62
789	Derek McVey	1992–1995	51	11	0	0	44
790	Matt Burke	1992	2	1	0	0	4
791	Bernard Carroll	1992–1994	22	0	0	0	0
792	Darren Thorson	1992	1	0	0	0	0
793	Levei Tuhetoka	1992–1993	7	1	0	0	4
794	Jamie Kelso	1992–1993	4	0	0	0	0
795	Jamie Corcoran	1993	18	3	15	0	42
796	Morvin Edwards	1993–1994	26	6	2	0	28
797	Mark Geyer	1993	13	2	0	0	8
798	Graham Lyons	1993–1994	33	14	0	0	56
799	Gavin Catanach	1993	12	0	0	0	0
800	Danny Stapleton	1993–1994	14	4	0	0	4
801	Stephen Scahill	1993–1995	12	1	0	0	4
802	David Chapman	1993	1	0	0	0	0
803	James Carrick	1993	4	2	0	0	8
804	Nathan Wood	1993–1994	19	4	0	0	16
805	Steve Fanale	1993	3	0	0	0	0
806	Dean Wheeler	1993	2	0	0	0	0
807	Shayne Boyd	1993	1	0	0	0	0
808	Wes Patten	1993–1996	27	7	0	0	28
809	Greg Bourke	1994–1996	22	7	29	0	86
810	Richie Connell	1994	5	0	0	0	0
811	David Ronson	1994	3	0	0	0	0
812	Hudson Smith	1994–1998	78	5	1	0	22
813	Paul Buchanan	1994	2	0	0	0	0
814	Michael Gillett	1994–1999	95	18	0	1	73
815	Shane Russell	1994–1995	18	9	0	0	36
816	Geoff Hassan	1994	2	0	0	0	0
817	Shane Powell	1994	14	0	0	0	0
818	Jason Small	1994–1995	9	0	0	0	0
819	Jason Darcy	1994	13	0	0	0	0
820	Chris Morcombe	1994, 1999	22	9	0	0	36
821	Damien Ford	1994–1995	10	1	0	0	4
822	Marty Moore	1994	11	4	0	0	16
823	John Bentley	1994	10	1	0	0	4
824	Des Clark	1994	13	0	0	0	0
825	Andrew McIlwaine	1994	1	0	0	0	0
826	Grant Stuart	1994	7	2	1	0	10
827	Chris Tauro	1994	3	0	0	0	0
828	Mark O'Neill	1994–1999	102	10	0	0	40
829	Greg Barwick	1995	17	0	37	1	75
830	Gary Edwards	1995–1997	30	10	0	0	40
831	Tony Price	1995	10	0	0	0	0
832	Darren Senter	1995–1999	100	15	0	0	60
833	Dan Stains	1995–1996	35	0	0	0	0
834	Shane Walker	1995–1999	100	2	1	0	10
835	Sean McVean	1995–1996	14	0	0	0	0
836	Asa Milford	1995–1997	22	3	0	0	12
837	Jeremy Moors	1995	9	1	4	0	12
838	Evan Cochrane	1995	7	4	0	0	16
839	Jason Carpenter	1995	1	0	0	0	0
840	Corey Pearson	1995–1996	25	1	0	0	4
841	Michael Withers	1995–1998	40	12	45	0	138
842	Peter Fitzgerald	1995	7	3	0	0	12
843	Dave Watson	1995	2	0	0	0	0
844	James Langaloa	1995	27	11	0	0	44
845	Ian Herron	1996	12	3	35	0	82
846	William Kennedy	1996–1998	61	16	0	0	104
847	Glenn Morrison	1996–1997	41	7	0	0	28
848	Tim Patterson	1996	14	2	0	0	8
849	Mark Stimson	1996–1999	77	5	0	0	20
850	Jason Thompson	1996	3	0	0	0	0
851	Bernard Wilson	1996–1997	6	0	0	0	0
852	Craig Patch	1996	5	1	0	0	4
853	Adam Starr	1996–1999	41	1	0	0	4
854	Mike Dorreen	1996	10	3	0	0	12
855	Scott McPherson	1996	1	0	0	0	0
856	Darren Anderson	1996	2	0	0	0	0
857	Anthony Brann	1996	4	0	0	0	0
858	Laloa Milford	1996–1999	38	18	0	0	72
859	Greg Donaghey	1997–1998	32	4	0	0	16
860	Craig Freer	1997	2	0	2	0	4
861	Adam Nable	1997–1999	57	11	0	0	44
862	Stephen Bosse	1997	1	0	0	0	0
863	Josh Bostock	1997	2	1	0	0	4
864	Jason Webber	1997–1999	52	14	0	0	56
865	Steven Jolly	1997	11	1	0	0	4
866	Chris McPherson	1997–1998	10	2	0	0	8
867	Jody Rudd	1997–1998	7	0	0	0	0
868	Chris St. Clair	1997–1998	7	0	0	0	0
869	Marshall Scott	1997–1998	10	0	0	0	0
870	Ben Duckworth	1998–1999	29	5	0	1	21
871	Shayne Dunley	1998–1999	28	3	0	0	12
872	Jim Gannon	1998–1999	22	0	0	0	0
873	Shannon Nevin	1998–1999	31	0	69	1	139
874	Brendan Magnus	1998–1999	10	3	0	0	12
875	Talite Liavaʻa	1998	6	0	0	0	0
876	Andrew Meads	1998–1999	12	1	0	0	4
877	Leigh Hennessy	1998	2	0	2	0	4
878	David McLean	1998	1	0	0	0	0
879	Joel Caine	1999	19	4	38	0	92
880	John Carlaw	1999	23	7	0	0	28
881	Craig Hancock	1999	20	6	0	0	24
882	Solomon Haumono	1999	8	1	0	0	4
883	Jason Lowrie	1999	24	0	0	0	0
884	Justin Yeo	1999	10	0	0	0	0
885	Brad Smith	1999	11	1	0	0	4
886	Tyran Smith	1999	16	0	0	0	0
887	Garth Wood	1999	3	0	0	0	0
888	Troy Wozniak	1999	2	0	0	0	0
889	Craig Field	1999	17	2	1	2	12
890	Richard Villasanti	1999	6	1	0	0	4
891	James Webster	1999	9	3	0	0	12
892	Steve Price	1999	3	1	0	0	4
893	Hayes Lauder	1999	7	0	0	0	0
894	Wade Rothery	1999	7	2	0	0	8
895	Ben Galea	1999	2	0	0	0	0
896	Michael Ostini	1999	4	0	0	0	0
897	Kylie Leuluai	1999	7	0	0	0	0
898	Nick Shaw	1999	1	0	0	0	0
899	Mark Luland	1999	4	1	0	0	4
900	Luke O'Donnell	1999	3	0	0	0	0
901	Nathan Webber	1999	1	0	0	0	0
