= Ponchard =

Ponchard is a surname. Notable people with the surname include:

- Antoine Ponchard (1787–1866), French operatic tenor and teacher
- Des Ponchard (1902–1983), Australian rugby league player
- Stan Ponchard (1924–2000), Australian rugby league player
