= Clint Robinson =

Clint Robinson may refer to:

- Clint Robinson (canoeist) (born 1972), Australian canoeist
- Clint Robinson (baseball) (born 1985), American baseball player
- Clint Robinson (rugby league) (born 1969), Australian rugby league player
