= Gary McFarlane (disambiguation) =

Gary McFarlane is an Australian rugby league player.

Gary McFarlane may also refer to:

- a minor character in the 2008 season of British television soap Emmerdale
- the applicant in McFarlane v Relate Avon Ltd, a 2010 case in the Court of Appeal of England and Wales
