= Graham Roberts (disambiguation) =

Graham Roberts (born 1959) is a former English footballer and manager.

Graham Roberts may also refer to:

- Graham Roberts (actor) (1929–2004), English actor
- Graham Roberts (rugby league) (born 1954), Australian rugby league footballer
