= Martin Moore =

Martin or Marty Moore may refer to:

- Martin B. Moore (1937–2022), American politician from Alaska
- Marty Moore (rugby union) (Martin Moore, born 1991), Irish rugby union player
- Marty Moore (rugby league) (Martin Moore, born 1969), Australian rugby league player
- Marty Moore (American football) (William Martin Moore, born 1971), American football player

== See also ==
- Martin Moore-Bick (born 1946), British judge
