= 1969 NSWRFL season =

Rugby league competition

1969 New South Wales Rugby Football League
- Teams: 12
- Premiers: Balmain (11th title)
- Minor premiers: South Sydney (15th title)
- Matches played: 136
- Points scored: 4258
- Total attendance: 1788112
- Top points scorer: Eric Simms (265)
- Wooden spoon: Cronulla-Sutherland (2nd spoon)
- Rothmans Medal: Denis Pittard
- Top try-scorer: Ken Irvine (17)

The 1969 New South Wales Rugby Football League premiership was the 62nd season of Sydney's professional rugby league football competition, Australia's first. Twelve teams, including six Sydney-based foundation teams and another six from the Sydney area competed for the J.J. Giltinan Shield and WD & HO Wills Cup during the season, which culminated in a grand final between Balmain and South Sydney.

== Season summary ==
South Sydney fullback Eric Simms' tally of 265 points for the season from 112 goals, 19 field-goals and one try topped the season point scoring record that had been set in the 1935 season by Dave Brown.

In Round 20, Ken Irvine scored his 153rd career try, surpassing Harold Horder as the highest try scorer in NSWRL history. He held the record until Alex Johnston broke it in 2026.

The 1969 season's Rothmans Medallist was South Sydney's Denis Pittard.

The 1969 season also saw the retirement from the League of future Australian Rugby League Hall of Fame inductee, John Raper.

=== Teams ===
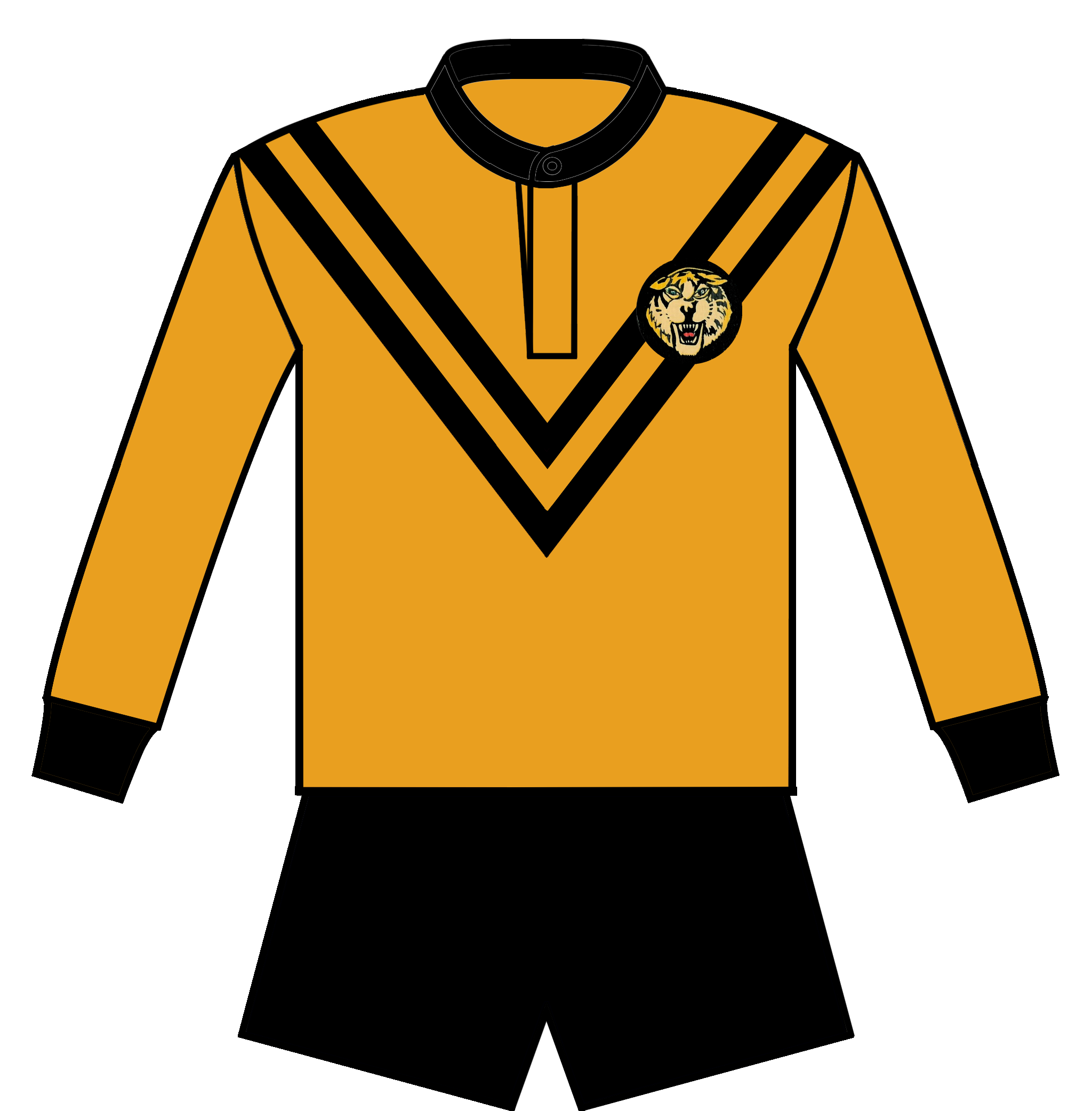
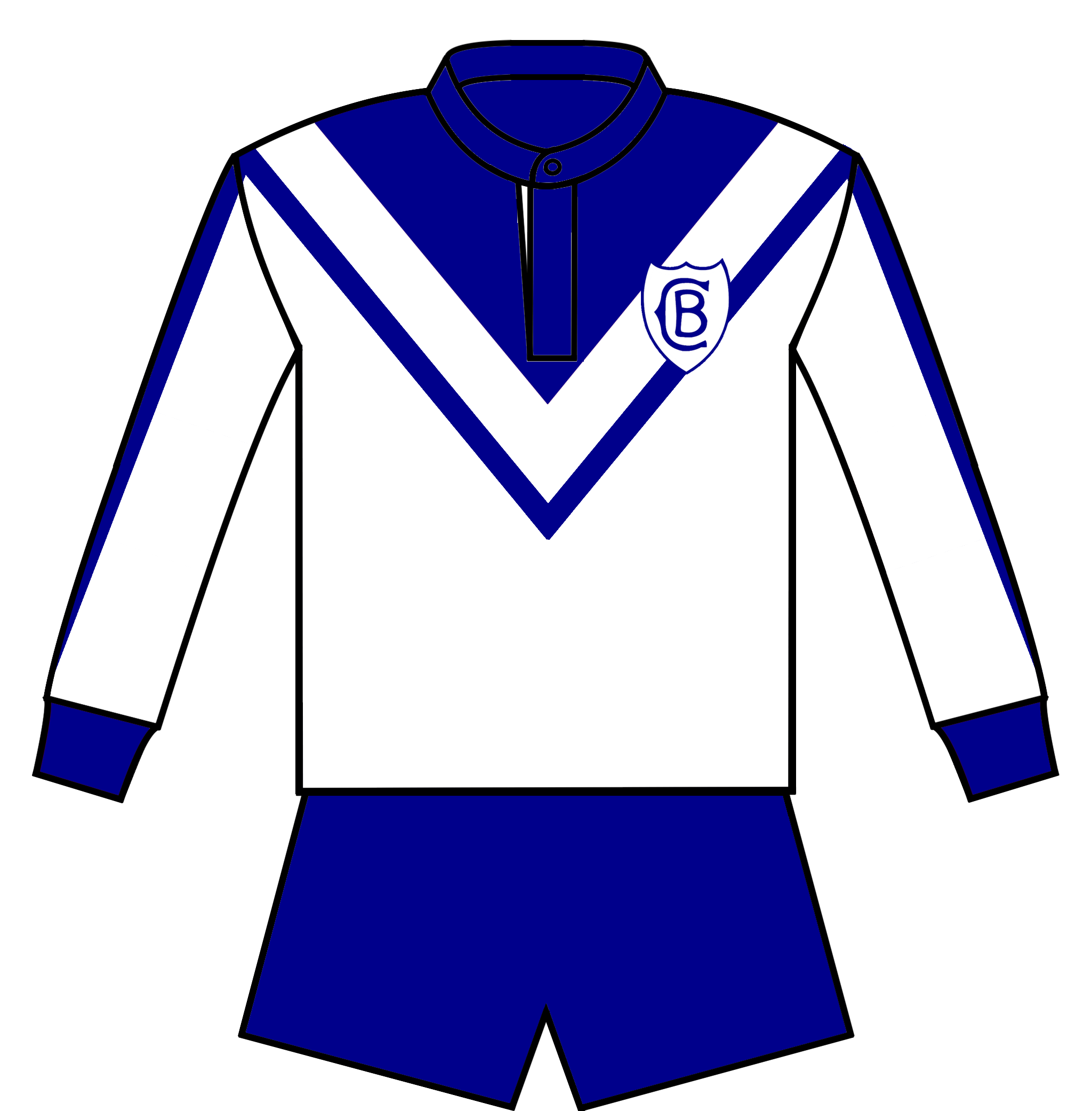
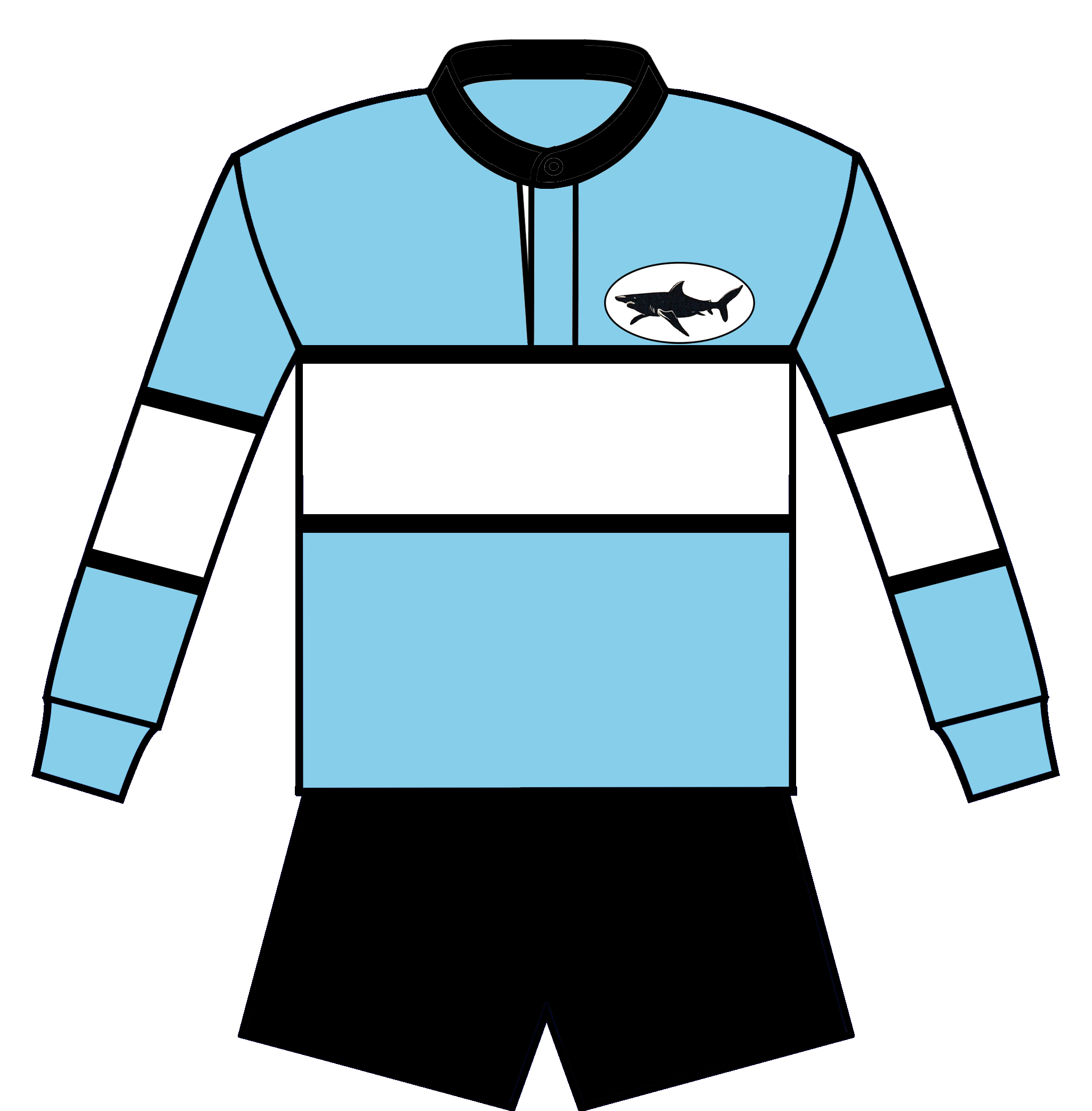
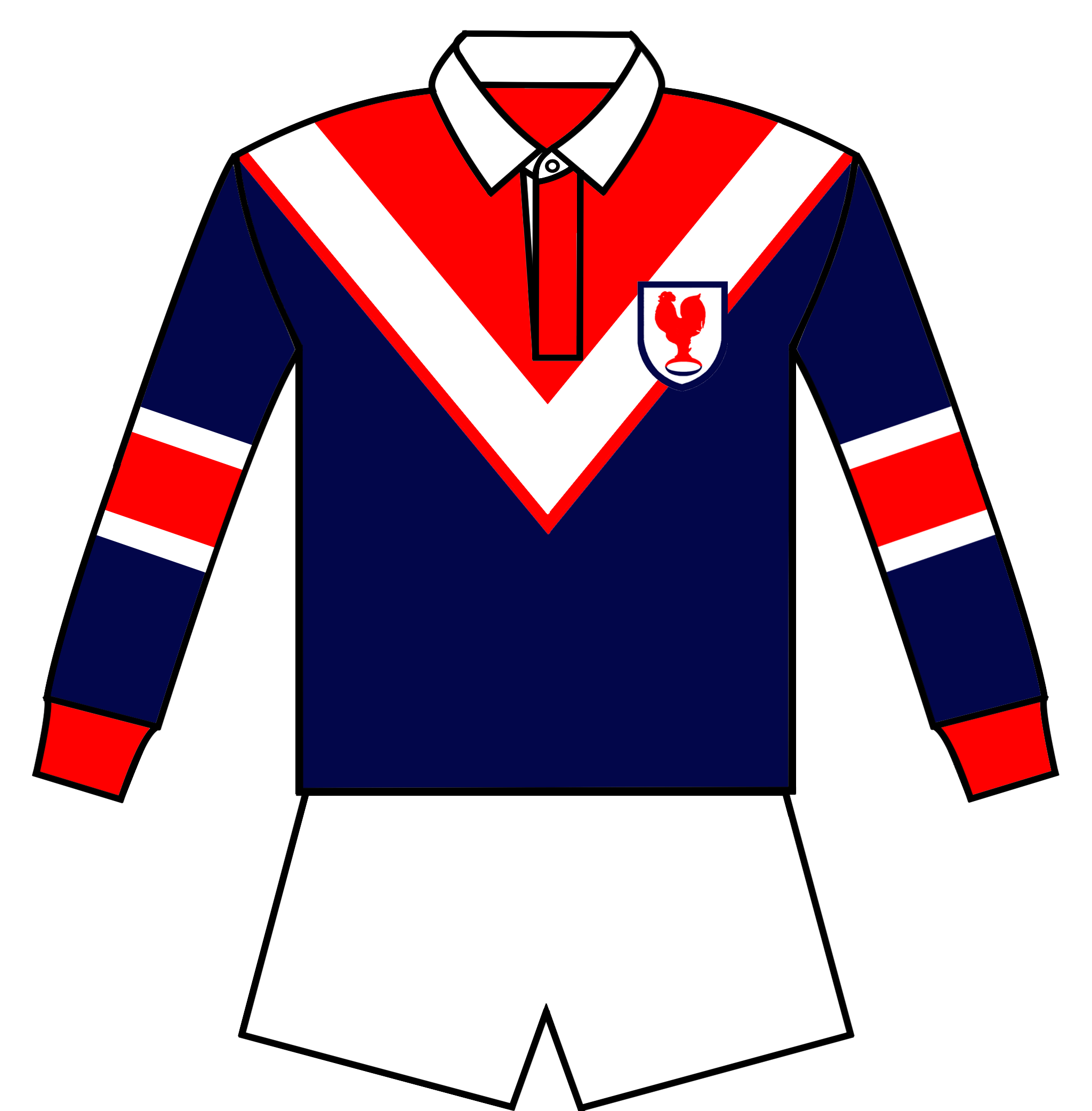
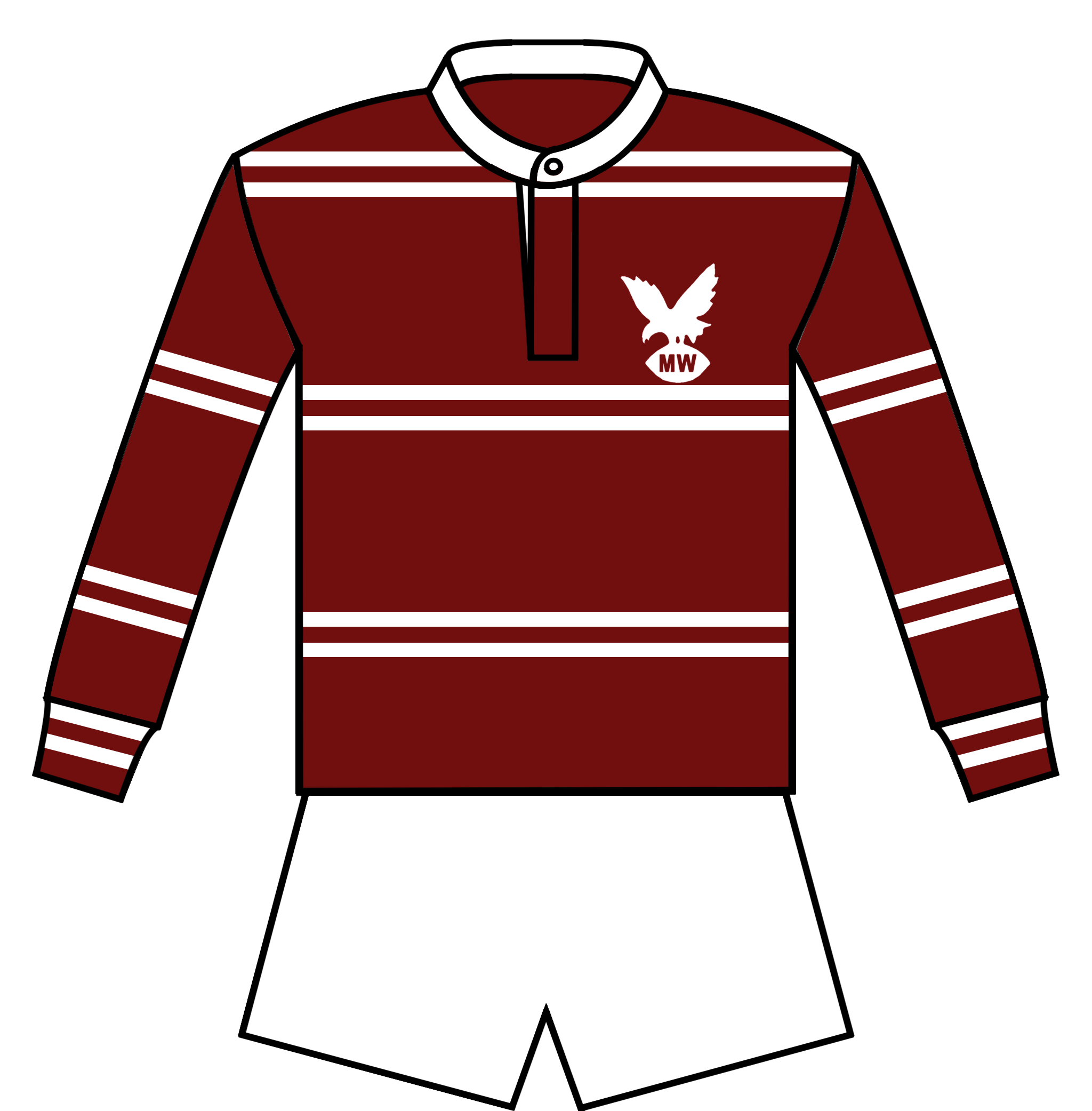
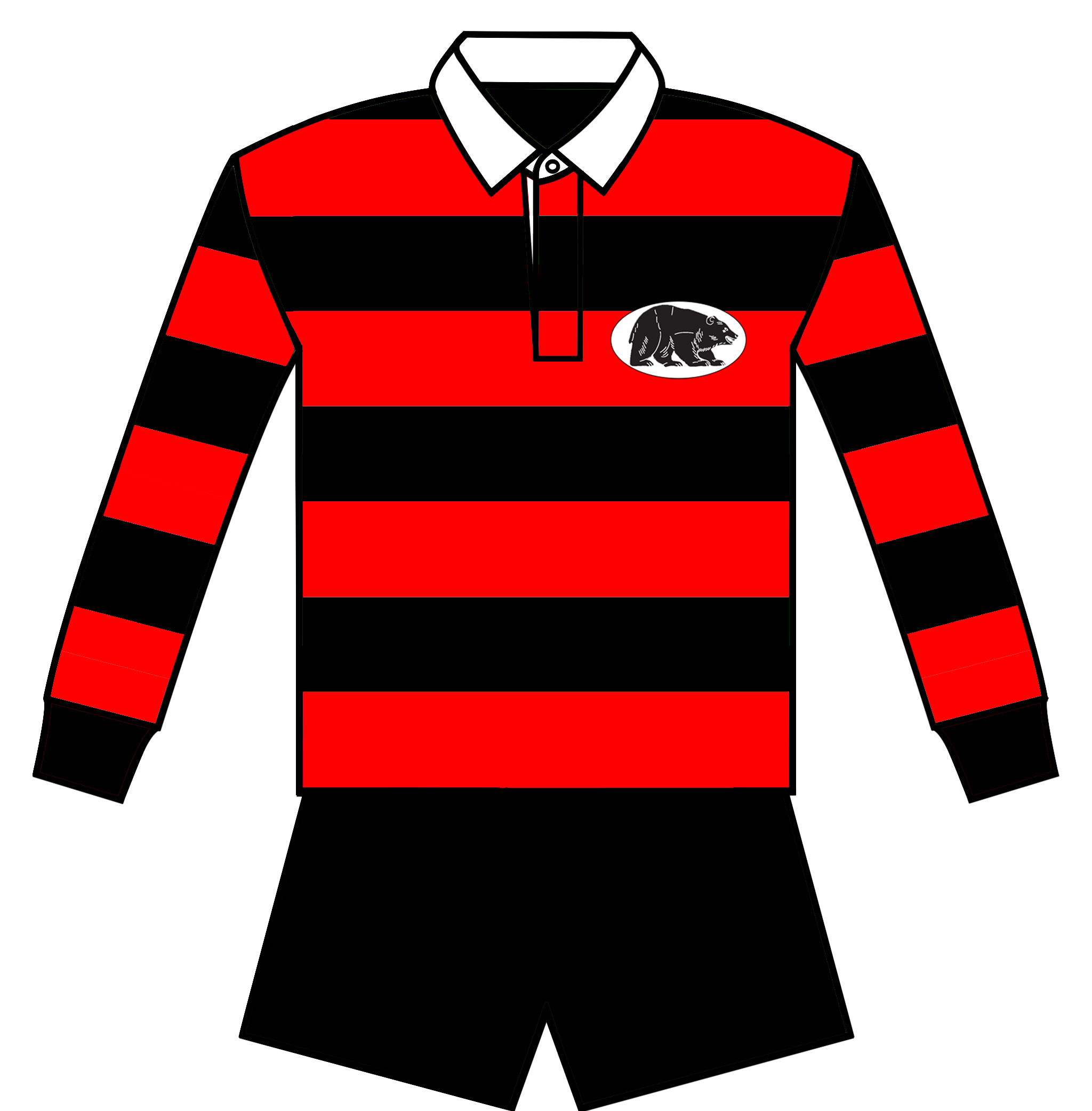
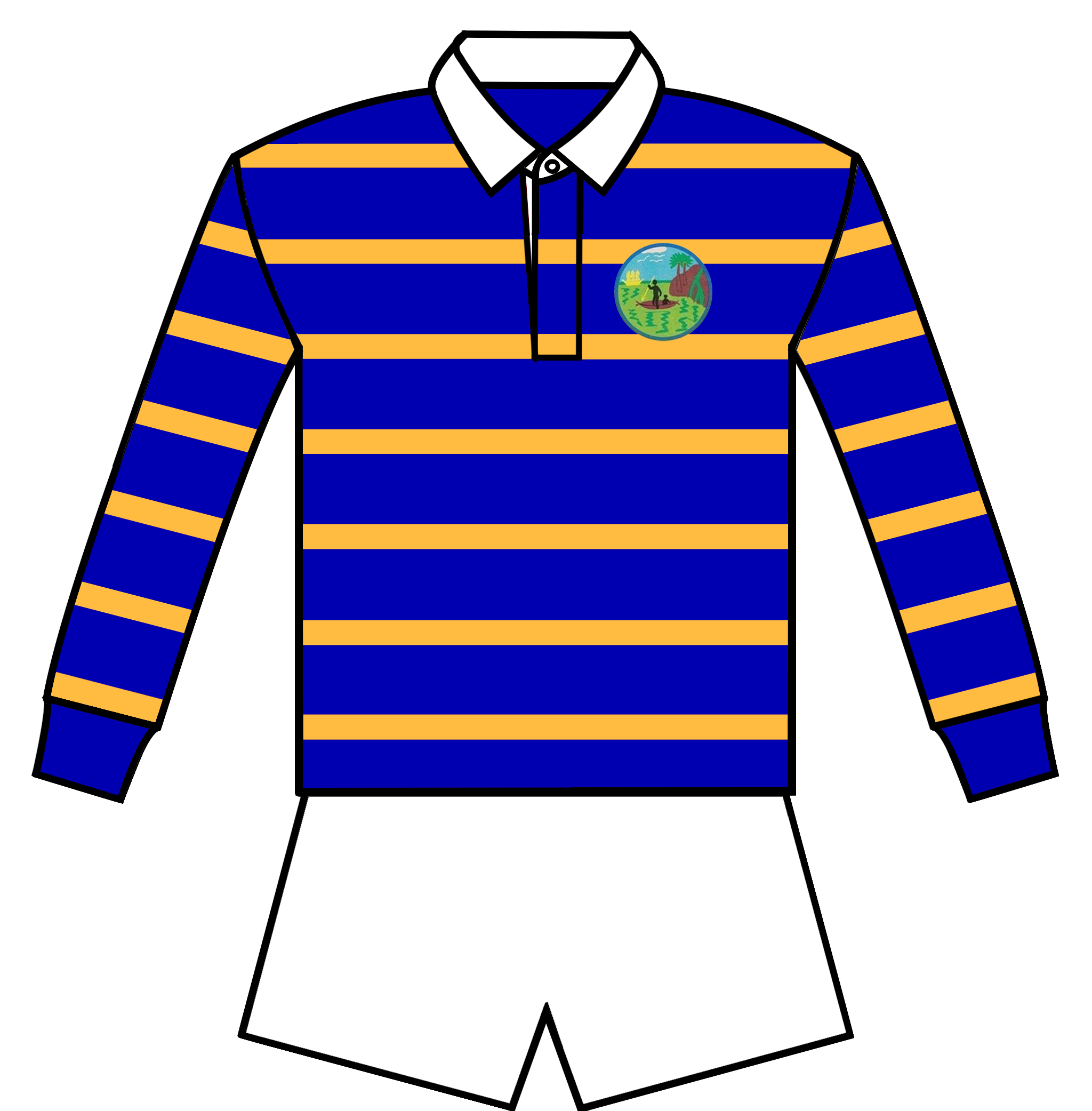
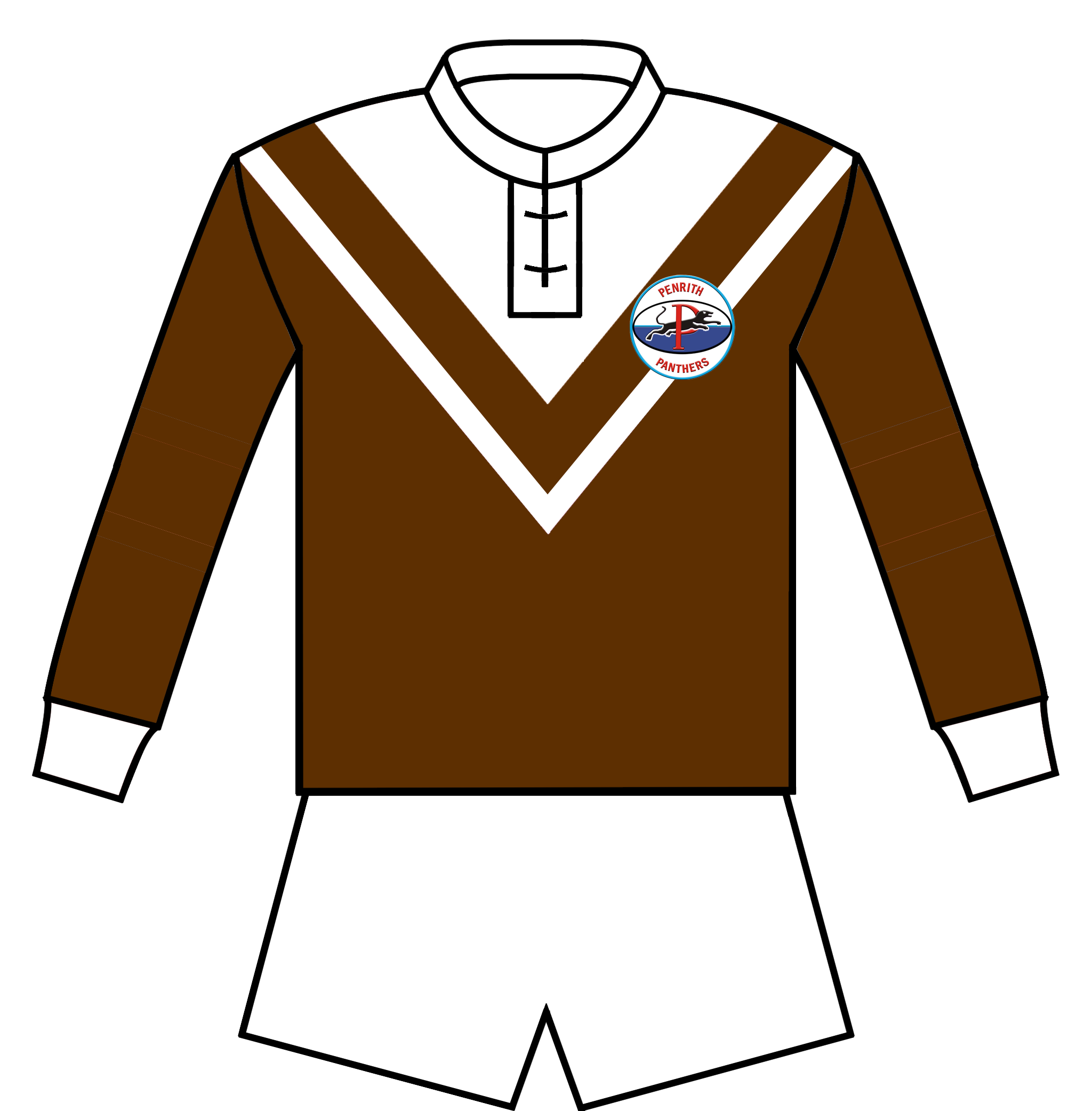
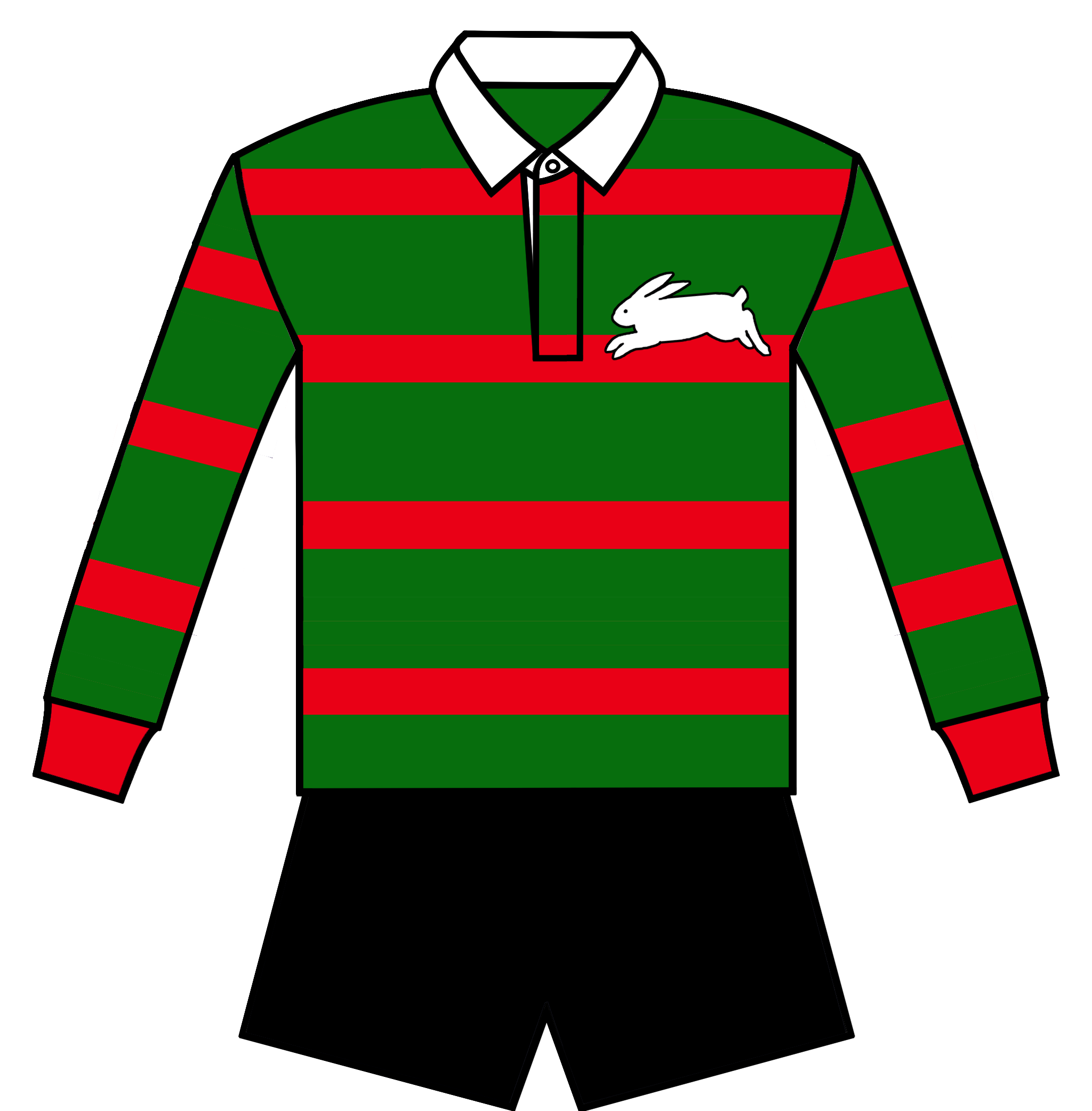
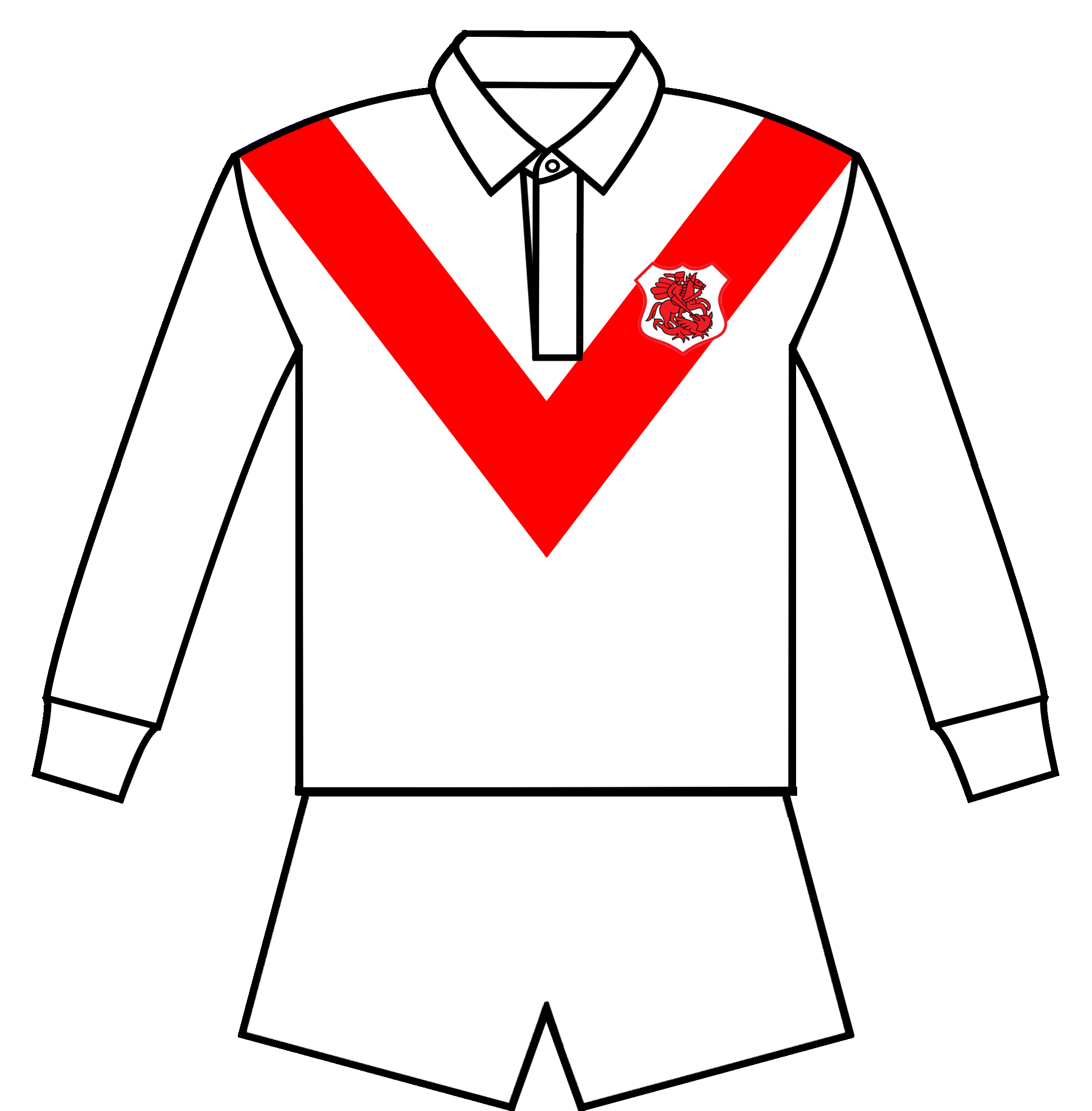
Balmain 62nd season Ground: Leichhardt Oval; Coach: Leo Nosworthy; Captain: Peter Provan	Canterbury-Bankstown 35th season Ground: Belmore Oval; Coach: Kevin Ryan; Captain: Kevin Ryan→Bob Hagan	Cronulla-Sutherland 3rd season Ground: Endeavour Field; Coach: Ken Kearney; Captain: Noel Thornton	Eastern Suburbs 62nd season Ground: Sydney Sports Ground; Captain-Coach: Louis Neumann
Manly-Warringah 23rd season Ground: Brookvale Oval; Coach: George Hunter; Captain(s): Bob Fulton / Fred Jones	Newtown 62nd season Ground: Henson Park; Coach: Harry Bath; Captain: Bob Carnegie	North Sydney 62nd season Ground: North Sydney Oval; Coach: Roy Francis; Captain: Ken Irvine	Parramatta 23rd season Ground: Cumberland Oval; Coach: Ian Johnston; Captain: Dick Thornett
Penrith 3rd season Ground: Penrith Park; Captain-coach: Bob Boland	South Sydney 62nd season Ground: Redfern Oval; Coach: Clive Churchill; Captain: John Sattler	St. George 49th season Ground: Kogarah Oval; Captain-coach: Johnny Raper	Western Suburbs 62nd season Ground: Lidcombe Oval; Captain-Coach: Noel Kelly

== Regular season ==
Team	1	2	3	4	5	6	7	8	9	10	11	12	13	14	15	16	17	18	19	20	21	22	F1	F2	F3	GF
Balmain	SOU +9	**CRO** **+18**	EAS +14	**PEN** **+1**	**MAN** **+5**	**CBY** **−4**	NEW +15	WES +9	**PAR** **+2**	**STG** **+5**	NOR +8	**SOU** **−17**	CRO +3	**EAS** **+2**	PEN −4	**MAN** **−3**	CBY +24	**NEW** **+10**	**WES** **−7**	PAR +5	**STG** **+9**	**NOR** **+2**	X	SOU −1	**MAN** **+1**	SOU +9
Canterbury-Bankstown	**NEW** **+18**	WES −21	**PAR** **+16**	STG +10	**NOR** **+6**	BAL +4	CRO +27	**EAS** **−5**	**PEN** **−5**	MAN −8	**SOU** **−20**	NEW −8	**WES** **+5**	PAR −9	**STG** **+4**	NOR −1	**BAL** **−24**	**CRO** **+11**	EAS −15	PEN −2	**MAN** **+12**	SOU −28				
Cronulla-Sutherland	**NOR** **−11**	BAL −18	SOU −39	**EAS** **−10**	PEN −20	MAN −9	**CBY** **−27**	NEW +16	**WES** **−1**	**PAR** **−7**	STG −4	NOR +8	**BAL** **−3**	**SOU** **−5**	EAS −5	**PEN** **+3**	**MAN** **−7**	CBY −11	**NEW** **+11**	WES −10	PAR +8	**STG** **−6**				
Eastern Suburbs	**STG** **+13**	NOR −9	**BAL** **−14**	CRO +10	**SOU** **−4**	**PEN** **+3**	MAN −7	CBY +5	**NEW** **+7**	WES −11	PAR −12	STG −4	**NOR**; **0**	BAL −2	**CRO** **+5**	SOU −27	PEN +1	**MAN** **−28**	**CBY** **+15**	NEW −18	**WES** **−17**	**PAR** **−8**				
Manly-Warringah	**WES** **+11**	PAR +2	STG −21	NOR +18	BAL −5	**CRO** **+9**	**EAS** **+7**	PEN +1	SOU −12	**CBY** **+8**	NEW −5	WES +1	**PAR** **+16**	STG −1	NOR −10	BAL +3	CRO +7	EAS +28	**PEN** **+9**	SOU −4	CBY −12	**NEW** **+7**	STG +9	X	BAL −1	
Newtown	CBY −18	SOU −14	**WES** **−18**	PAR −25	**STG** **−3**	NOR −9	**BAL** **−15**	**CRO** **−16**	EAS −7	PEN; 0	**MAN** **+5**	**CBY** **+8**	**SOU** **−20**	WES +6	**PAR** **−1**	STG −18	**NOR** **+6**	BAL −10	CRO −11	**EAS** **+18**	**PEN** **+7**	MAN −7				
North Sydney	CRO +11	**EAS** **+9**	PEN +3	**MAN** **−18**	CBY −6	**NEW** **+9**	**WES** **−3**	PAR +4	STG −23	SOU +9	**BAL** **−8**	**CRO** **−8**	EAS; 0	**PEN** **+29**	**MAN** **+10**	**CBY** **+1**	NEW −6	WES −5	**PAR** **+3**	**STG** **−8**	SOU −20	BAL −2				
Parramatta	PEN +11	**MAN** **−2**	CBY −16	**NEW** **+25**	WES +6	SOU −27	**STG** **+1**	**NOR** **−4**	BAL −2	CRO +7	**EAS** **+12**	**PEN** **−2**	MAN −16	**CBY** **+9**	NEW +1	**WES** **+6**	SOU +9	STG −25	NOR −3	**BAL** **−5**	**CRO** **−8**	EAS +8				
Penrith	**PAR** **−11**	STG −24	**NOR** **−3**	BAL −1	**CRO** **+20**	EAS −3	SOU −1	**MAN** **−1**	CBY +5	**NEW**; **0**	WES +6	PAR +2	**STG** **−1**	NOR −29	**BAL** **+4**	CRO −3	**EAS** **−1**	**SOU** **−22**	MAN −9	**CBY** **+2**	NEW −7	**WES** **−10**				
South Sydney	**BAL** **−9**	**NEW** **+14**	**CRO** **+39**	WES +10	EAS +4	**PAR** **+27**	**PEN** **+1**	**STG** **−4**	**MAN** **+12**	**NOR** **−9**	CBY +20	BAL +17	NEW +20	CRO +5	**WES** **+7**	**EAS** **+27**	**PAR** **−9**	PEN +22	**STG** **+21**	**MAN** **+4**	**NOR** **+20**	**CBY** **+28**	X	**BAL** **+1**	X	**BAL** **−9**
St. George	EAS −13	**PEN** **+24**	**MAN** **+21**	**CBY** **−10**	NEW +3	**WES** **−2**	PAR −1	SOU +4	**NOR** **+23**	BAL −5	**CRO** **+4**	**EAS** **+4**	PEN +1	**MAN** **+1**	CBY −4	**NEW** **+18**	WES +11	**PAR** **+25**	SOU −21	NOR +8	BAL −9	CRO +6	**MAN** **−9**			
Western Suburbs	MAN −11	**CBY** **+21**	NEW +18	**SOU** **−10**	**PAR** **−6**	STG +2	NOR +3	**BAL** **−9**	CRO +1	**EAS** **+11**	**PEN** **−6**	**MAN** **−1**	CBY −5	**NEW** **−6**	SOU −7	PAR −6	**STG** **−11**	**NOR** **+5**	BAL +7	**CRO** **+10**	EAS +17	PEN +10				
Team	1	2	3	4	5	6	7	8	9	10	11	12	13	14	15	16	17	18	19	20	21	22	F1	F2	F3	GF

Bold – Home game
X – Bye
Opponent for round listed above margin

=== Ladder ===
	Team	Pld	W	D	L	PF	PA	PD	Pts
1	South Sydney	22	18	0	4	489	222	+267	36
2	Balmain	22	17	0	5	410	304	+106	34
3	St. George	22	14	0	8	411	323	+88	28
4	Manly	22	14	0	8	355	298	+57	28
5	Western Suburbs	22	11	0	11	315	288	+27	22
6	Parramatta	22	11	0	11	323	338	-15	22
7	North Sydney	22	10	1	11	343	362	-19	21
8	Canterbury	22	10	0	12	316	349	-33	20
9	Eastern Suburbs	22	8	1	13	307	409	-102	17
10	Penrith	22	6	1	15	311	398	-87	13
11	Newtown	22	6	1	15	279	421	-142	13
12	Cronulla	22	5	0	17	301	448	-147	10

=== Ladder progression ===
- Numbers highlighted in green indicate that the team finished the round inside the top 4.
- Numbers highlighted in blue indicates the team finished first on the ladder in that round.
- Numbers highlighted in red indicates the team finished last place on the ladder in that round.

	Team	1	2	3	4	5	6	7	8	9	10	11	12	13	14	15	16	17	18	19	20	21	22
1	South Sydney	0	2	4	6	8	10	12	12	14	14	16	18	20	22	24	26	26	28	30	32	34	36
2	Balmain	2	4	6	8	10	10	12	14	16	18	20	20	22	24	24	24	26	28	28	30	32	34
3	St. George	0	2	4	4	6	6	6	8	10	10	12	14	16	18	18	20	22	24	24	26	26	28
4	Manly-Warringah	2	4	4	6	6	8	10	12	12	14	14	16	18	18	18	20	22	24	26	26	26	28
5	Western Suburbs	0	2	4	4	4	6	8	8	10	12	12	12	12	12	12	12	12	14	16	18	20	22
6	Parramatta	2	2	2	4	6	6	8	8	8	10	12	12	12	14	16	18	20	20	20	20	20	22
7	North Sydney	2	4	6	6	6	8	8	10	10	12	12	12	13	15	17	19	19	19	21	21	21	21
8	Canterbury-Bankstown	2	2	4	6	8	10	12	12	12	12	12	12	14	14	16	16	16	18	18	18	20	20
9	Eastern Suburbs	2	2	2	4	4	6	6	8	10	10	10	10	11	11	13	13	15	15	17	17	17	17
10	Penrith	0	0	0	0	2	2	2	2	4	5	7	9	9	9	11	11	11	11	11	13	13	13
11	Newtown	0	0	0	0	0	0	0	0	0	1	3	5	5	7	7	7	9	9	9	11	13	13
12	Cronulla-Sutherland	0	0	0	0	0	0	0	2	2	2	2	4	4	4	4	6	6	6	8	8	10	10

== Finals ==
In the preliminary final, Balmain trailed 12-14 against Manly-Warringah until late in the match when winger George Ruebner charged for the corner post to snatch a win in dramatic fashion.

Home	Score	Away	Match Information
Home	Score	Away	Date and Time	Venue	Referee	Crowd
Semi-finals
Manly-Warringah Sea Eagles	19–10	St. George Dragons	30 August 1969	Sydney Cricket Ground	Keith Page	40,977
South Sydney Rabbitohs	14–13	Balmain Tigers	6 September 1969	Sydney Cricket Ground	Keith Page	44,159
Preliminary Final
Balmain Tigers	15–14	Manly-Warringah Sea Eagles	13 September 1969	Sydney Cricket Ground	Keith Page	41,410
Grand Final
South Sydney Rabbitohs	2–11	Balmain Tigers	20 September 1969	Sydney Cricket Ground	Keith Page	58,825

=== Grand Final ===
South Sydney	Position	Balmain
1. Eric Simms	FB	1. Robert Smithies
2. Michael Cleary	WG	2. George Ruebner
3. Bob Honan	CE	3. Allan Fitzgibbon
4. Kerry Burke	CE	4. Terry Parker
5. Brian James	WG	5. Len Killeen
6. Denis Pittard	FE	6. Keith Outten
7. Bob Grant	HB	7. Dave Bolton
13. John Sattler (c)	PR	13. Garry Leo
12. Elwyn Walters	HK	12. Peter Boulton
11. John O'Neill	PR	11. Barry McTaggart
10. Bob McCarthy	SR	10. John Spencer
9. Bob Moses	SR	9. Joe Walsh
8. Ron Coote	LK	8. Peter Provan (c)
17. Paul Sait	Reserve	14. Sid Williams
Clive Churchill	Coach	Leo Nosworthy

Balmain were not given a chance of winning the Premiership after the retirement of Keith Barnes. Souths had won the last two premierships, beaten the Tigers in the major semi-final to advance to the Grand Final and boasted eleven internationals in their side.

However, as a result their favouritism Souths were overconfident and showed insufficient respect to the young Tigers, who had shown early-season form in beating them in round 1, and to their rookie coach Leo Nosworthy, who presented a well-prepared and determined Balmain team.

The Tigers led 6–0 at halftime after two penalty goals by Len Killeen and a Dave Bolton field-goal. Souths refusal to kick on the last tackle played into Balmain's hands as novice replacement hooker Peter Boulton managed to consistently regain possession from the scrums. Balmain backed up with a robust defensive line and kept South pinned in their own half.

After the break a Bob McCarthy fumble after a mix up with Paul Sait saw Bolton swoop on the ball deep in Souths territory. From the ruck Terry Parker slipped a beautiful pass to replacement winger Sid Williams who juggled but held the ball to cross the line for the only try of the match. With a 9–0 lead early in the second half and a penalty count that continued to mount in their favour, Balmain took control of the game and appeared to begin a ploy of feigning injury whenever Souths looked to build rhythm, stopping the Rabbitohs' flow of play. Hence the match is still referred to today as "the lay-down grand final".

Souths' protests proved pointless as referee Keith Page (in his first Grand Final) was powerless to stop the Tigers tactics under the rules of the day, and Balmain secured and held an 11–2 lead to win their first premiership since 1947 and to give a fairy-tale career farewell for their captain and 159-game veteran Peter Provan.

This was the 11th and most recent premiership for the Tigers as just Balmain, and in 1999, the club formed a 50/50 joint venture with the Western Suburbs Magpies to become the Wests Tigers. The joint venture that continues to this day

Balmain 11 (Tries: Williams. Goals: Killeen 2. Field Goal: D Bolton 2)

South Sydney 2 (Goals: Simms 1.)

== Player statistics ==
The following statistics are as of the conclusion of Round 22.

Top 5 point scorers

Points	Player	Tries	Goals	Field Goals
255	Eric Simms	1	108	18
185	Len Killeen	9	73	6
166	Bob Batty	2	77	3
158	Bob Landers	6	70	0
156	Graeme Langlands	4	72	0

Top 5 try scorers

Tries	Player
17	Ken Irvine
16	Johnny King
12	Denis Pittard
10	Bob McCarthy
10	John McDonald
10	Barry Beath
10	George Ambrum

Top 5 goal scorers

Goals	Player
108	Eric Simms
77	Bob Batty
73	Len Killeen
72	Graeme Langlands
70	Bob Landers
