= Kerry Burke (rugby league) =

Australian rugby league footballer

Personal information
- Full name: Kerry Burke

Playing information
- Position: Centre
Club
Years	Team	Pld	T	G	FG	P
1964–68	Parramatta	24	2	2	0	10
1969–72	South Sydney	18	7	0	0	21
	Total	42	9	2	0	31

Kerry Burke is an Australian former rugby league footballer who played in the 1960s and 1970s.

== Playing career ==
A Parramatta junior, Burke was graded at Parramatta in 1963 and was playing first grade the following year. He played with Parramatta until the end of 1968, and joined South Sydney the following year.

Burke played centre in the unsuccessful Souths team that played in the 1969 Grand Final. Burke lost his permanent position in first grade to the emerging young player, Paul Sait in 1970.

Burke appeared in South Sydney first grade teams until his retirement at the end of the 1972 NSWRFL season.
