= Les Mara =

Australian rugby league player

Personal information
- Born: 1953 (age 71–72)

Playing information
- Position: Five-eighth
Club
Years	Team	Pld	T	G	FG	P
1975–76	Balmain Tigers	29	9	0	1	28
1975	→St Helens RFC	6	3	0	0	9
1977	South Sydney	18	4	0	1	13
1978–79	Balmain Tigers	27	9	0	1	28
1982	Newtown Jets	7	1	0	0	3
	Total	87	26	0	3	81
Representative
Years	Team	Pld	T	G	FG	P
1974	Illawarra Firsts	1	0	0	0	0
1975–76	New South Wales	2	0	0	0	0
- Relatives: Bob Mara (uncle); Gary Mara (cousin)

Les Mara (born 1953) is an Australian former rugby league player.

== Rugby league career ==
An ex-Balmain junior, Mara had a stint with Thirroul prior to making his first-grade debut with Balmain in 1975. During that time in 1974 he represented Illawarra Firsts against the touring Great Britain Lions.

He featured for Balmain as a five-eighth and at the end of his debut season made several appearances for English club St. Helens, which included a match against the touring Australian national side. In 1975 and 1976, Mara represented NSW in interstate matches against Queensland. He left Balmain in 1977 for South Sydney, where he alternated between five-eighth and lock, then returned to the Tigers for two more seasons. After a season coaching Kurri Kurri, Mara had two years in the merchant navy, before resuming his league career with Newtown in 1982.

== Prison sentence ==
Mara was charged in 2006 with conspiracy to import cocaine into the country from South America, as part of a scheme involving airport baggage-handlers. He had evaded authorities for 18 months before his arrest in Callala Bay, New South Wales, having previously been hiding out in Brazil and Ireland. In 2007, Mara was sentenced to a 20-year jail term, with 13-years to be served until he was eligible for parole.
