= Sid Williams (rugby league) =

Australian rugby league footballer (born 1944)

Syd Williams
Personal information
- Born: 11 July 1944 (age 82) Sydney, New South Wales, Australia

Playing information
- Position: Halfback, wing
Club
Years	Team	Pld	T	G	FG	P
1966–70	Balmain	51	13	26	0	91
1971	Eastern Suburbs	1	0	0	0	0
	Total	52	13	26	0	91

Syd Williams is an Australian former rugby league footballer who played in the 1960s and 1970s. In September 1967, Syd played halfback in the Bob Fulton Captain/Coached City side that lost to Country 16 - 12. This was the second City v Country fixture for the season, and was played to determine final selections for the 1967 Kangaroo tour. He is best remembered as the only try scorer in Balmain's 1969 winning Grand Final team.

== Playing career ==
Williams played five seasons with Balmain between 1966 and 1970. He is remembered as the replacement for George Reubner in the 1969 Grand Final, and scored the try that won the match for the Balmain club over South Sydney 11–2. Williams shifted to Eastern Suburbs for one season in 1971 before retiring. Syd was a popular member of staff at Sydney Council Council, now known as Ausgrid, and was portrayed as a character, a Media and Communications Advisor, in the Netflix Series Rake starring Richard Roxsburgh.
