= Horrie Watt =

Australian rugby league footballer (1891–1969)

Personal information
- Full name: Horace Charles Watt
- Born: 6 March 1891 Balmain, New South Wales, Australia
- Died: 11 September 1969 (aged 78) Regents Park, New South Wales, Australia

Playing information
- Position: Hooker, second-row
Club
Years	Team	Pld	T	G	FG	P
1917–25	Balmain	93	11	3	0	39
Representative
Years	Team	Pld	T	G	FG	P
1919–24	New South Wales	8	0	0	0	0
1924	Australia	3	0	0	0	0
- Source: As of 14 February 2019
- Relatives: George Watt (nephew); Neville Watt (nephew)

Horace Charles Watt (6 March 1891 – 11 September 1969), sometimes known as Harry Watt, was an Australian rugby league footballer of the 1910s and 1920s. He won a premiership with Balmain in 1924.

== Background ==
Watt was born in Balmain, Sydney, New South Wales, in 1891, the son of George and Elizabeth Watt. He came through the junior ranks to be graded with Balmain in 1917.

== Playing career ==
A hooker or second-row, Watt played nine seasons of first grade football with Balmain between 1917 and 1925, and played in the winning Balmain side that won the 1924 Grand Final.

Watt represented New South Wales on four occasions in 1919, 1921 and 1924. He also played three Tests for the Kangaroos against England in 1924.

Watt died on 11 September 1969 in Regents Park, Sydney, aged 78.
