= Terry Parker =

Australian rugby league footballer and administrator

Personal information
- Full name: Terry Parker
- Born: 19 October 1949 (age 75)

Playing information
- Position: Centre
Club
Years	Team	Pld	T	G	FG	P
1968–73	Balmain		17	0	0	51

Terry Parker (born 1949) is an Australian former rugby league footballer who played in the 1960s and 1970s, and later an administrator.

Terry Parker played for the Balmain Tigers for five seasons between 1969 and 1973. In his debut year, Parker won a premiership with the victorious Balmain Tigers team that defeated the South Sydney Rabbitohs in the 1969 Grand Final. After retiring from playing, Parker became an administrator, and was the CEO of the South Sydney Rabbitohs for more than a decade before resigning during the super league war. He also served as a Director of the NSWRFL and the ARL during this time.
