= Bob Mara =

Australian rugby league footballer

Personal information
- Full name: Robert William Mara
- Born: 19 July 1940; Balmain, New South Wales, Australia
- Died: 22 January 2014 (aged 73); Sydney, New South Wales, Australia

Playing information
- Position: Wing
Club
Years	Team	Pld	T	G	FG	P
1959–67	Balmain	81	70	2	0	214
1968–69	Penrith	22	12	0	1	38
	Total	103	82	2	1	252
- Relatives: Gary Mara (son); Les Mara (nephew)

Robert William "Bob" Mara (1940–2014) was an Australian professional rugby league footballer who played as a winger for Balmain and was the father of Gary Mara.

== Playing career ==
Mara made his debut for Balmain in 1959 scoring 9 tries in his first season. Mara went on to play for Balmain in the 1964 and 1966 New South Wales Rugby League grand finals against St. George losing on both occasions.

In 1968, Mara moved to the newly admitted side Penrith Panthers where he played for two seasons before retiring at the end of 1969. After retirement, Mara was inducted into the Balmain Tigers hall of fame and is considered as one of the club's greatest wingers.
