= Peter Provan =

Australian rugby league footballer

Personal information
- Full name: Peter Sommerville Provan
- Born: 13 August 1936 Sydney, New South Wales, Australia
- Died: 13 May 2010 (aged 73) Cronulla, New South Wales

Playing information
- Position: Lock
Club
| Years | Team | Pld | T | G | FG | P |
|---|---|---|---|---|---|---|
| 1956–60 | St. George | 18 | 2 | 0 | 0 | 6 |
| 1961–69 | Balmain | 155 | 12 | 0 | 0 | 36 |
| | Total | 173 | 14 | 0 | 0 | 42 |
Representative
| Years | Team | Pld | T | G | FG | P |
| 1963 | Australia | 1 | 0 | 0 | 0 | 0 |
- Relatives: Norm Provan (brother)

Peter Provan (13 August 1936 – 13 May 2010) was an Australian professional rugby league footballer who played in the 1950s and 1960s. He played for St. George Dragons, Balmain Tigers and Australia.

== Career ==
He primarily played at lock. Provan and his older brother, Norm Provan, are the only pair of brothers to lead grand-final winning teams on victory laps of the Sydney Cricket Ground; Peter Provan with Balmain and Norm Provan with St. George.

Provan began his first-grade career at St. George in 1956 and was a member of two grand-final winning sides in 1958 and 1959.

Provan signed with Balmain in 1960 where he appeared in three grand finals during his nine-seasons with the club. He captained the team to one grand-final win, in 1969, against South Sydney and retired at the end of the season.

Selected for one Test, Provan played against New Zealand in Sydney in 1963. He is listed on the Australian Players Register as Kangaroo No.380.

As part of the Australian Centenary of Rugby League celebrations in April 2008, Peter Provan and John Sattler, captains of the 1969 grand final teams, carried the ball onto the Sydney Cricket Ground before the Wests Tigers and South Sydney match as the last leg of a ball-relay from Birchgrove Oval to the SCG.

== Death ==
After a long illness, Provan died in Sydney on 13 May 2010.

At the time of his death Balmain Tigers Chairman David Trodden released the following statement: "The Tigers have lost one of the most famous and most respected figures in the history of our club. He led us to perhaps our greatest Grand Final win ever. For that reason alone, he will always have a very special place in our memory".
