= Billy Bischoff =

Australian rugby league footballer

Personal information
- Full name: William James Bischoff
- Born: 26 October 1912; Sydney, New South Wales, Australia
- Died: 15 September 1988 (aged 75); Sydney, New South Wales, Australia

Playing information
- Position: Five-eighth
Club
Years	Team	Pld	T	G	FG	P
1937–40	Balmain	36	3	0	0	9
Representative
Years	Team	Pld	T	G	FG	P
1933	NSW Country	1	0	0	0	0
- Relatives: Billy Bischoff Jr. (son)

William James Bischoff (1912–1988) was an Australian rugby league footballer who played in the 1930s and 1940s.

== Playing career ==
Billy 'Bok' Bischoff was a five-eighth for Balmain between 1937 and 1940. He won a premiership with Balmain, playing in the winning 1939 Grand Final team. His son, Billy Bischoff Jr. also played for the Balmain Tigers in the 1960s.

Balmain Premiers 1939 – Bischoff 1st row 2nd from left

== Death ==
Bischoff died on 15 September 1988, aged 75.
