= Gary Mara =

Australian rugby league footballer

Personal information
- Full name: Gary Robert Mara
- Born: 9 August 1962
- Died: 21 August 2012 (aged 50) Los Angeles, California, United States

Playing information
Club
Years	Team	Pld	T	G	FG	P
1982	Balmain Tigers	1	0	0	0	0
1984	Parramatta Eels	2	0	3	0	6
	Total	3	0	3	0	6
- Source: Rugby League Project
- Father: Bob Mara
- Relatives: Les Mara (cousin)

Gary Robert Mara (9 August 1962 – 21 August 2012) was an Australian professional rugby league footballer who played in the 1980s. The son of Bob Mara, he played for Balmain Tigers in the 1982 NSWRL season, and for Parramatta Eels in the 1984 NSWRL season.

After leaving rugby league, he worked at his family's pub, the Unity Hall Hotel in Balmain.

Mara died while holidaying with his family in Los Angeles, when he and his daughter were struck by a speeding drunk driver as they crossed a road. The driver, model Cara Cameron, was charged with murder and vehicular manslaughter. In a plea deal Cameron pleaded 'no contest' to "vehicular manslaughter while intoxicated". She will serve four years' jail, and pay US$100,000 to the Mara family.
