= Mark Beaven =

Australian rugby league footballer

Personal information
- Full name: Mark Beaven
- Born: 30 April 1958 (age 68) Sydney, New South Wales, Australia

Playing information
- Position: Centre, Lock
Club
Years	Team	Pld	T	G	FG	P
1976–78	Balmain Tigers	5	0	0	0	0
1979–83	Western Suburbs	57	7	0	0	23
1984	Eastern Suburbs	17	3	0	0	12
	Total	79	10	0	0	35
- Source: As of 3 January 2023
- Relatives: Paul Beaven (brother)

Mark Beaven (born 1958) is an Australian former professional rugby league footballer who played in the 1970s and 1980s. He played for Eastern Suburbs, Western Suburbs and Balmain in the NSWRL competition.

== Playing career ==
Beaven made his first grade debut for Balmain in round 11 of the 1976 NSWRFL season against eventual premiers Manly-Warringah at Brookvale Oval. Beaven would be limited to only five matches with Balmain over three seasons. He then signed for Western Suburbs in 1979 and became a regular with the team. That year, Beaven played in Western Suburbs elimination finals loss to Canterbury-Bankstown. Beaven would play with Wests until the end of 1983 and then signed a contract with Eastern Suburbs. Beaven played 17 games for Easts as they finished second last on the table.
