= Neville Watt =

Australian rugby league footballer (1930–2019)

Personal information
- Full name: Neville Watt
- Born: 21 December 1930 Balmain, New South Wales, Australia
- Died: 1 February 2019 (aged 88) Macquarie Park, New South Wales, Australia

Playing information
- Position: Hooker, Prop
Club
Years	Team	Pld	T	G	FG	P
1952–59	Balmain	104	15	39	0	123
- Source: As of 29 March 2019
- Relatives: George Watt (brother); Horrie Watt (uncle)

Neville Watt (1930–2019) was an Australian professional rugby league footballer who played in 1950s. He played his entire career for Balmain in the NSWRL competition.

== Background ==
Watt was born in Balmain, New South Wales and grew up in the area before being graded by the Balmain club.

== Playing career ==
Watt made his first grade debut for Balmain in 1952. In his first few seasons with Balmain, the club missed the finals after much of the team which won premierships in the 1940s had retired. In 1956, Balmain finished second on the table only one point behind minor premiers St George. Balmain went on to reach the 1956 grand final after defeating defending premiers South Sydney in the preliminary final.

Watt played at hooker in the 1956 grand final against St George. Balmain lost the match 18–12 in front of 60,000 fans at the Sydney Cricket Ground. The grand final win for St George was their first of 11 successive premiership victories.

In 1958, Balmain reached the preliminary final against St George with Watt playing at prop in the match as they lost 26–21. Watt played with Balmain until the end of the 1959 season. He died on 1 February 2019.
