= Peter Boulton =

Australian rugby league footballer

Personal information
- Full name: Peter Boulton
- Born: Grafton, New South Wales, Australia

Playing information
- Position: Hooker
Club
Years	Team	Pld	T	G	FG	P
1969–75	Balmain	95	2	0	0	6
- Source: As of 14 February 2019

Peter Boulton is an Australian former rugby league footballer who played in the 1960s and 1970s.

== Playing career ==
Boulton came from Grafton, New South Wales. He joined Balmain in 1969, and in his second first grade game, he was selected as a hooker for the Tigers team that won the 1969 Grand Final.

Boulton played seven seasons with the Tigers between 1969-1975, before retiring from first grade rugby league after suffering a succession of knee injuries.
