= Billy Bischoff Jr. =

Australian rugby league footballer (1938–2023)

Billy Bischoff
Personal information
- Full name: William Bischoff
- Born: 12 March 1938; Sydney, New South Wales, Australia
- Died: 6 June 2023 (aged 85); Robin, Gold Coast, Queensland

Playing information
- Position: Five-eighth, Centre, Halfback
Club
Years	Team	Pld	T	G	FG	P
1957–65	Balmain	151	34	0	0	102
Representative
Years	Team	Pld	T	G	FG	P
1961	New South Wales	1	0	0	0	0
1962	NSW City	1	0	0	0	0
1967–68	NSW Country	2	0	0	0	0
- Source: As of 26 April 2019
- Father: Billy Bischoff

William Bischoff Jr. (12 March 1938 – 6 June 2023) was an Australian professional rugby league footballer who played in the 1950s and 1960s. He played for Balmain in the New South Wales Rugby League (NSWRL) competition. His father, Billy Bischoff also played for Balmain and was a member of the 1939 premiership winning team.

== Playing career ==
Bischoff made his first grade debut for Balmain in 1957. In 1958, Bischoff played at five-eighth in the club's preliminary final loss scoring a try against St George. In 1961, Bischoff was selected to play for New South Wales against Queensland and featured in one game. At club level, Balmain reached the preliminary final against Western Suburbs but were defeated 8-5 with Bischoff playing at centre. In 1962, Bischoff was selected to play for NSW City.

In 1963, Balmain reached the semi-final but were defeated by Parramatta. The following season in 1964, Balmain reached the grand final after defeating North Sydney and Parramatta. Bischoff played at halfback in the final as Balmain took a shock halftime lead over St George before Saints came back in the second half to win 11-6 at the Sydney Cricket Ground. Bischoff left Balmain at the end of 1965 having played 151 games for the club.

In 1966, Bischoff joined West Tamworth in the New South Wales country competition as captain-coach. He was selected in 1967 and 1968 for the NSW Country side. Bischoff retired from playing at the end of 1968. He would go on to coach the Werris Creek Magpies RLFC to a Group 4 first-division Premiership in 1979 and help break a 27-year premiership drought.

== Death ==
Bischoff died in June 2023, at the age of 85.
