= Robert Smithies =

English-Australian rugby league footballer

Personal information
- Full name: Robert Smithies
- Born: 26 February 1948 England
- Died: 5 November 2019 (aged 71)

Playing information
- Position: Fullback
Club
Years	Team	Pld	T	G	FG	P
1969–71	Balmain	58	14	2	0	46
1972–76	Hull KR	55	22	0	0	66
	Total	113	36	2	0	112
- Source: As of 14 February 2019

Robert Smithies (26 February 1948 – 5 November 2019) was an English rugby league player who played in the 1960s and 1970s.

== Playing career ==
Smithies came to Balmain from the Illawarra competition in 1969.

He played three seasons with Balmain between 1969 and 1971, before moving to England to play for Hull KR for five years making 54 appearances plus 1 substitute appearance, scoring 22 tries for 66 points.

Smithies won a premiership with Balmain when he played full-back in the 1969 Grand Final.

Smithies played fullback in Hull Kingston Rovers' 16–13 victory over Wakefield Trinity in the 1974 Yorkshire Cup Final during the 1974–75 season at Headingley, Leeds on Saturday 26 October 1974.

== Death ==
Smithies died on 5 November 2019, aged 71.
