= George Watt (rugby league) =

Australia international rugby league footballer

Personal information
- Full name: George Watt
- Born: 28 April 1917 Sydney, New South Wales, Australia
- Died: 28 February 2010 (aged 92) Kingston upon Hull, England

Playing information
- Position: Hooker
Club
| Years | Team | Pld | T | G | FG | P |
|---|---|---|---|---|---|---|
| 1938–44 | Balmain | 73 | 9 | 2 | 0 | 31 |
| 1945–46 | Eastern Suburbs | 27 | 7 | 0 | 0 | 21 |
| 1947 | Booroowa |
| 1948–51 | Hull FC | 90 |
| 1951–54 | Rochdale |
| 1954 | Balmain | 2 | 0 | 0 | 0 | 0 |
| | Total | 192 | 16 | 2 | 0 | 52 |
Representative
| Years | Team | Pld | T | G | FG | P |
| 1944–46 | NSW City | 3 | 2 | 1 | 0 | 8 |
| 1946 | Australia | 3 | 0 | 0 | 0 | 0 |
| 1945–47 | New South Wales | 9 | 5 | 0 | 0 | 15 |
- Relatives: Neville Watt (brother); Horrie Watt (uncle)

George Watt (28 April 1917 – 28 February 2010) was an Australian rugby league footballer who played in the 1940s and 1950s. A New South Wales state and Australian international representative forward, he played his club football in Sydney for Eastern Suburbs and Balmain, winning premierships with both clubs. Watt then continued his career with English clubs Hull FC and Rochdale.

== Playing career ==
A Hooker, Watt was the nephew of Australian international Horrie Watt, George played in Sydney's NSWRFL Premiership for the Balmain club, winning the 1939 and 1944 seasons' grand finals with them. He then moved to cross-town rivals Eastern Suburbs where he was a member of their 1945 premiership winning side. In 1946 Watt was selected to represent Australia and played in all three Test matches of the series against Great Britain. He moved to Boorowa, New South Wales in 1947.

In 1948 Watt moved to England to play for Hull F.C. He was captain of Hull during the 1948–49 season.

Watt later had a three-year spell with Rochdale before returning to Australia in 1954 to have one final season with Balmain. In 1959, Watt returned to England settling in Hull. He remained there until his death in 2010.
