= Barry McTaggart =

Australian rugby league footballer

Personal information
- Full name: Barry McTaggart
- Born: 28 June 1946 (age 78); Gympie, Queensland, Australia

Playing information
- Position: Prop
Club
| Years | Team | Pld | T | G | FG | P |
|---|---|---|---|---|---|---|
| 1969–72 | Balmain | 59 | 1 | 0 | 0 | 3 |
Representative
| Years | Team | Pld | T | G | FG | P |
| 1970 | Australia | 1 | 0 | 0 | 0 | 0 |
- Source: Whiticker/Hudson

Barry McTaggart (born 28 June 1946) is an Australian former rugby league footballer who played in the 1960s and 1970s.

== Playing career ==
Originally from Gympie, Queensland, McTaggart signed with Balmain in 1969 and won a premiership in his debut year when he played prop forward in the 1969 Grand Final win over South Sydney.

McTaggart played four seasons at Balmain between 1969 and 1972, and was chosen to tour England with the Australian World Cup squad in 1970. He played one test match on that tour against France before injury curtailed the rest of his tour. Barry McTaggart is listed on the Australian Players Register as Kangaroo No.453. He also played three minor matches on the World Cup Tour and he retired in 1973.
