= Paul Beaven =

Australian rugby league footballer

Personal information
- Full name: Paul Gerard Beaven
- Born: 19 December 1964 (age 61) Sydney, New South Wales, Australia

Playing information
- Position: Centre, Five-eighth
Club
Years	Team	Pld	T	G	FG	P
1983	Western Suburbs	4	0	0	0	0
1984–88	Balmain	41	8	0	0	32
1989	North Sydney	18	1	0	0	4
	Total	63	9	0	0	36
- Source: As of 16 January 2023
- Relatives: Mark Beaven (brother)

Paul Beaven (born 1964) is an Australian former professional rugby league footballer who played in the 1980s. He played for North Sydney, Western Suburbs and Balmain in the NSWRL competition.

== Background ==
Beaven is the younger brother of former rugby league player Mark Beaven.

== Playing career ==
Beaven made his first grade debut for Western Suburbs in round 8 of the 1983 NSWRFL season against South Sydney at Lidcombe Oval. Beaven made four appearances that season as Wests finished with the Wooden Spoon. In 1984, Beaven joined Balmain and played 41 games for the club over five seasons. In 1989, he joined North Sydney and played 18 matches. Beaven's final game in the top grade was a 30-0 loss against Brisbane in round 22 of the 1989 NSWRL season.
