= Garry Leo =

Australian rugby league footballer (1944/1945–2026)

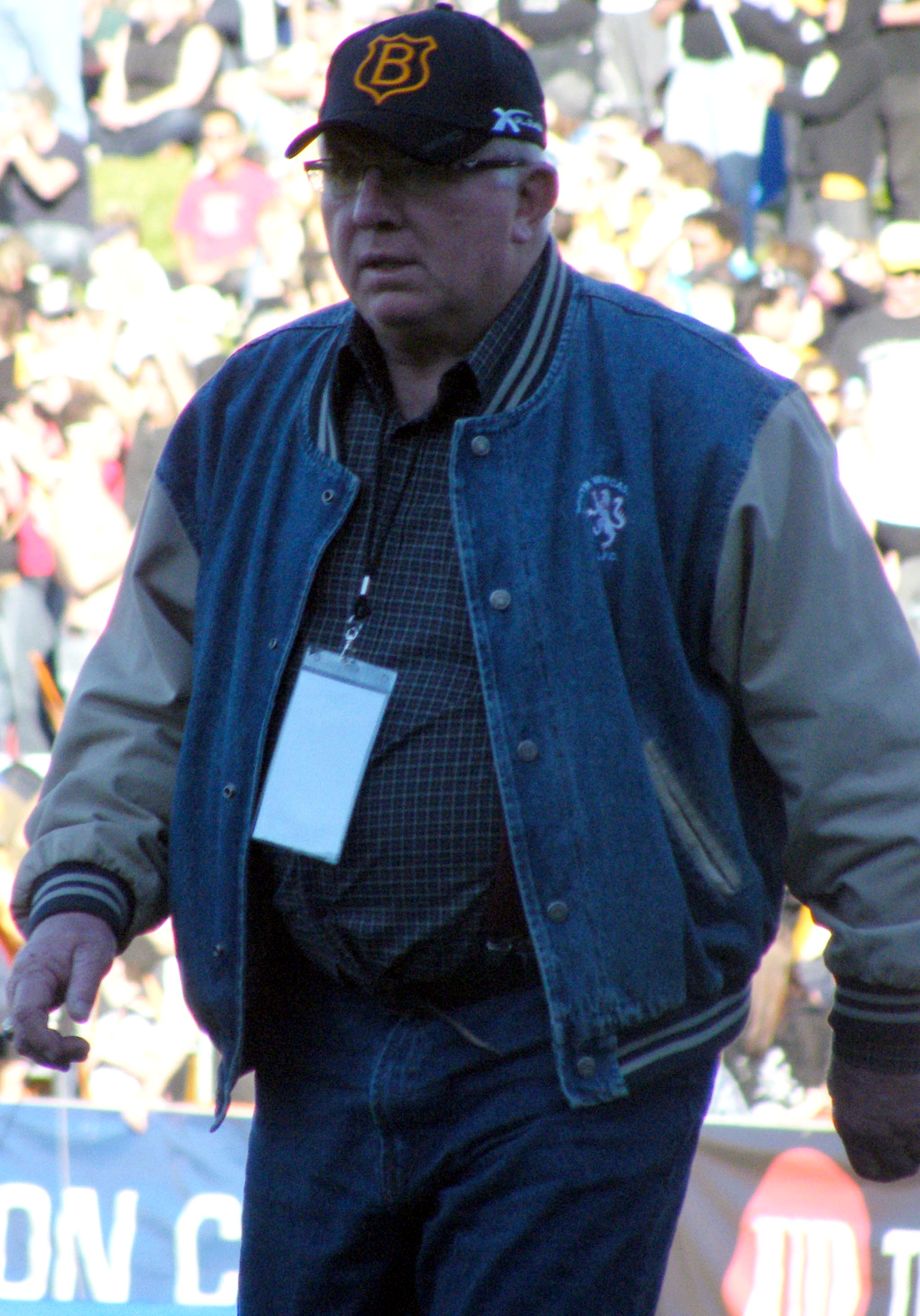

Personal information
- Full name: Garry William Leo
- Born: 11 October 1944
- Died: 19 March 2026 (aged 81)

Playing information
- Position: Lock
Club
Years	Team	Pld	T	G	FG	P
1963–1974	Balmain	156	27	0	1	83
Representative
Years	Team	Pld	T	G	FG	P
1967	New South Wales	1	1	0	0	3
- Source: Whiticker/Hudson

Garry William Leo OAM (11 October 1944 – 19 March 2026) was an Australian rugby league footballer who played in the 1960s and 1970s.

== Background ==
Leo attended Fort Street Boys High School at Petersham and made the Combined High Schools rugby union team in which he was picked as a centre. While at school he also scored high marks in both Latin and French in his leaving certificate. Former New South Wales politician Rodney Cavalier has described Leo as "the only first-grade front-rower to ever get an "A" in Latin in the leaving".

== Playing career ==
Leo was a prop-forward for the Balmain club. In a career that lasted eleven seasons, he was graded straight into first grade with Balmain in 1963 and remained with the club until the end of the 1974 season. Leo played in over 150 games for the Tigers and he became club captain later in his career.

He won a premiership with Balmain in 1969 and also represented New South Wales on one occasion in 1967. After retiring from Balmain, he joined Newcastle Norths as captain-coach in 1975.

== Post playing ==
On 29 August 2024, it was reported in the media that Balmain directors led by Leo had called a crisis meeting with the intention of splitting from their merger arrangement with Western Suburbs. It was stated that there were frustrations and concerns relating to decisions made by the Holman Barnes Group (HBG)—majority owner of the Wests Tigers. Leo stated he had "lost faith in them" referring to the Western Suburbs side. Leo went on to state "I really believe the time has come for us to step aside and resurrect the Balmain Tigers, We're getting Leichhardt Oval upgraded and we could play there every second week. If we can find the right backers, we want a shot at returning to the NRL". The following day, Danny Stapleton one of the other board members stated that Balmain were 100% committed to the merger and the reports were not true. Former Balmain player Benny Elias also spoke with the media calling for Leo to be sacked.

Leo died on 19 March 2026, at the age of 81.
