= Marty Moore (rugby league) =

Australian rugby league footballer

Personal information
- Full name: Martin Moore
- Born: 5 November 1969 (age 55)

Playing information
- Position: Wing, Centre
Club
Years	Team	Pld	T	G	FG	P
1994	Balmain Tigers	11	4	0	0	16
1995	Penrith Panthers	11	4	0	0	16
1996–97	South Sydney	31	8	0	0	32
	Total	53	16	0	0	64

Marty Moore is an Australian former professional rugby league footballer who played in the 1990s. He played for South Sydney, Balmain and Penrith in the New South Wales Rugby League (NSWRL) and ARL competitions.

== Playing career ==
Moore made his first grade debut for Balmain in round 9 1994 against Newcastle at Leichhardt Oval. Moore scored the winning try with his first touch in first grade and Balmain went on to win the game 26–22.

In 1995, Moore joined Penrith and scored a try on debut for the club against Parramatta at Penrith Park. Moore made 11 appearances for Penrith.

He then joined South Sydney in 1996. Moore spent two years at Souths in which the club finished second last on both occasions. At the end of 1997, Moore was released by Souths. Moore then spent time playing out in the Group 10 competition with the Bathurst Penguins.
