= Joe Walsh (Australian rugby league) =

Australian rugby league player (1945/1946–2025)

Personal information
- Born: 1945 or 1946
- Died: 18 November 2025 (aged 79) Wagga Wagga, New South Wales, Australia

Playing information
- Position: Second-row
Club
Years	Team	Pld	T	G	FG	P
1969–73	Balmain Tigers	53	2	0	0	6

Joseph John Walsh (1945 or 1946 – 18 November 2025) was an Australian rugby league player for the Balmain Tigers.

== Biography ==
Walsh hailed from Barmedman, a village outside West Wyalong in country New South Wales.

A second-rower, Walsh was recruited to Balmain from the Queanbeyan Kangaroos. He featured in Balmain's 1969 grand final-winning team. After missing the entire 1971 season with a knee injury, Walsh remained at Balmain for two more seasons, then returned to country rugby league. He coached a young Royce Simmons while captain-coach of the Cowra Magpies, which he led to a premiership in 1978.

Walsh once owned the Riverina Hotel in Wagga Wagga.

Walsh died from cancer in Wagga Wagga, on 18 November 2025, at the age of 79.
