= Gary McFarlane =

Australian rugby league footballer

Personal information
- Full name: Gary McFarlane
- Born: 8 January 1964 (age 61)

Playing information
- Position: Prop, Second-row
Club
| Years | Team | Pld | T | G | FG | P |
|---|---|---|---|---|---|---|
| 1985–88 | Western Suburbs | 20 | 0 | 1 | 0 | 2 |
| 1986–87 | Whitehaven | 10 | 2 | 0 | 0 | 8 |
| 1989–93 | Balmain Tigers | 45 | 5 | 0 | 0 | 20 |
| | Total | 75 | 7 | 1 | 0 | 30 |
- Source: As of 28 December 2022

Gary McFarlane is an Australian former professional rugby league footballer who played in the 1980s and 1990s. He played for Balmain and Western Suburbs in the NSWRL competition. McFarlane also played for Whitehaven in England.

== Playing career ==
McFarlane made his first grade debut for Western Suburbs in round 19 of the 1985 NSWRL season against the Illawarra Steelers. McFarlane played off the interchange bench in Wests 32–20 victory at WIN Stadium. McFarlane's time at Western Suburbs was largely unsuccessful with the club finishing last in 1987 and 1988. During the 1986 NSWRL off-season, McFarlane played for second division Whitehaven in England. In 1989, McFarlane joined Balmain and played five matches throughout the year as the club would go on to reach the grand final. In 1990, McFarlane played 15 games as Balmain reached the finals. McFarlane played in what was to be Balmain's last finals game as a stand-alone entity when they were beaten 16–0 by Manly. McFarlane would play three more seasons with Balmain and departed the club at the end of 1993. He would later go on to captain-coach Young in the Group 9 competition.
