= Des Ponchard =

Australian rugby league footballer

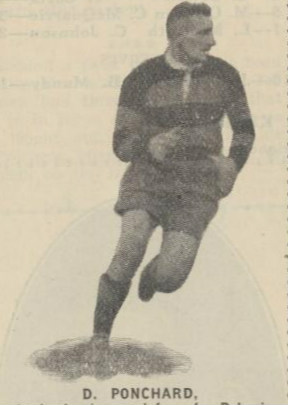
- Des Ponchard 1929

Personal information
- Full name: Desmond Patrick Ponchard
- Born: 1902 Cooma, New South Wales, Australia
- Died: 16 April 1983 (aged 80–81) Sydney, New South Wales, Australia

Playing information
- Position: Fullback
Club
Years	Team	Pld	T	G	FG	P
1922–29	Balmain	59	1	39	0	81
- Relatives: Stan Ponchard (nephew)

Desmond Patrick Ponchard (1902–1983) was an Australian Rugby League player who played in the 1920s.

== Background ==
Ponchard was born in Cooma, New South Wales to a pioneer family from the Monaro region in New South Wales. His family moved to Rozelle, New South Wales when he was a small boy, and he took up the game of Rugby League at a young age.

== Playing career ==
He became a successful fullback in junior football and after a six years in the juniors, he made his first grade debut for Balmain in 1922. He had a long career at Balmain and played eight seasons of first grade between 1922 and 1929.

He won a premiership with the Balmain in 1924 playing in the team that was captain-coached by the legendary Charles 'Chook' Fraser.

Although he was not a noted point scorer, he became the team goal kicker in the latter part of his career. He scored one try and kicked 38 goals during his first grade career at the Tigers. After retiring from football, he retained a close association with the Balmain club due to his lifetime friendships with ex team-mates 'Latchem' Robinson and 'Chook' Fraser. His nephew Stan Ponchard also became a successful first grade player with the Balmain Tigers in the 1940s and 1950s.

Ponchard died on 16 April 1983, aged 80.
