= Clint Robinson (rugby league) =

Australian rugby league footballer (born 1969)

Personal information
- Full name: Clint Paul Robinson
- Born: 21 June 1969 (age 56) Bankstown, New South Wales, Australia

Playing information
- Position: Wing
Club
Years	Team	Pld	T	G	FG	P
1987–92	Balmain Tigers	52	19	0	0	76
- Source: As of 13 January 2023

Clint Robinson is an Australian former professional rugby league footballer who played in the 1980s and 1990s. He played for Balmain in NSWRL competition.

== Background ==
Robinson is the father of women's rugby league player Andie Robinson.

== Playing career ==
Robinson made his first grade debut for Balmain in round 14 of the 1987 NSWRL season against the defending premiers Parramatta at Leichhardt Oval. Robinson played off the bench in a 19-0 victory. The following year, Robinson played for the majority of the season but missed out on Balmain's finals campaign and grand final loss to Canterbury. In 1990, Robinson was involved in Balmain's last two finals matches as a stand-alone entity. Robinson's final year with Balmain was in 1992 where he played 19 games and scored eight tries.
