= Graham Roberts (rugby league) =

Australian rugby league footballer (born 1954)

Personal information
- Born: 11 February 1954 (age 72) Surry Hills, New South Wales, Australia

Playing information
- Position: Centre
Club
Years	Team	Pld	T	G	FG	P
1975–76	Balmain Tigers	24	5	43	0	101

Graham Roberts (born 11 February 1954) is an Australian former rugby league footballer.

Roberts is the son of Kangaroos representative winger Ron Roberts.

Originally from Cudgen near Tweed Heads, Roberts had a stint with Brothers in Brisbane, before making his way to Balmain, where he was a first–grade player in 1975 and 1976. He was utilised primarily as a goal–kicking centre and featured in the Balmain side which won the 1976 Wills Cup.
