= George Ruebner =

Australia international rugby union & league player

Personal information
- Full name: George Ruebner
- Born: 3 August 1942 (age 83) Shanghai, China

Playing information

Rugby union
- Position: wing
Club
Years	Team	Pld	T	G	FG	P
196?–66	Randwick DRUFC
Representative
Years	Team	Pld	T	G	FG	P
1966	Wallabies	2				5

Rugby league
- Position: Wing
Club
Years	Team	Pld	T	G	FG	P
1967–71	Balmain	55
Representative
Years	Team	Pld	T	G	FG	P
1968	New South Wales

George Ruebner (born 3 August 1942) is an Australian former rugby union and rugby league footballer.

George Ruebner, a wing, was born in Shanghai, came from Randwick DRUFC, and claimed a total of 2 international caps for Australia in 1966.

He switched to Rugby League the following year and played 55 career games for the Balmain Tigers for five seasons between 1967 and 1971, winning the 1969 NSWRFL premiership with them.

He represented New South Wales in two games against Queensland in 1968. He retired in 1972.
