= Stan Ponchard =

Australian rugby league footballer

Personal information
- Full name: Stanley Frederick Ponchard
- Born: 13 February 1924
- Died: 22 November 2000 (aged 76) Kempsey, New South Wales, Australia

Playing information
- Position: Halfback
Club
Years	Team	Pld	T	G	FG	P
1943–53	Balmain	104	46	14	0	166
Representative
Years	Team	Pld	T	G	FG	P
1948	NSW City	1	0	0	0	0
- Relatives: Des Ponchard (uncle)

Stanley Frederick 'Stan' Ponchard (13 February 1924 – 22 November 2000) was a professional rugby league footballer who played in the 1940s and 1950s. He played for the Balmain Tigers in the NSWRFL.

== Biography ==
A Balmain junior, Ponchard played five-eighth for Balmain between 1943–1948 and 1951–1953. He also captained the club during his career. He appeared in 104 first grade games and scored 46 tries and kicked 14 goals.

Ponchard won two premierships with Balmain in 1944 and 1946. His representative career extended to one appearance for N.S.W. City Firsts in 1948.

He was the nephew of another Balmain stalwart, Des Ponchard who played with the Tigers between 1922–1929.

Ponchard moved to Kempsey, New South Wales after his playing career, and died there on 22 November 2000.

== Accolades ==
Stan Ponchard was posthumously inducted into the Balmain Tigers Hall of Fame in 2010.
