= 1947 NSWRFL season =

Rugby league competition

1947 New South Wales Rugby Football League
- Teams: 10
- Premiers: Balmain (10th title)
- Minor premiers: Canterbury (3rd title)
- Matches played: 95
- Points scored: 3238
- Top points scorer(s): Pat Devery (142)
- Wooden spoon: Parramatta (1st spoon)
- Top try-scorer(s): Bob Lulham (28)

The 1947 New South Wales Rugby Football League premiership was the fortieth season of Sydney’s top-level rugby league competition, Australia's first. For the first time, the number of clubs in the league reached double digits due to the admission of Manly-Warringah and Parramatta to the first grade competition. The season culminated in a grand final between the Balmain and Canterbury-Bankstown clubs.

== Season summary ==
Midway through the season the Balmain club looked out of touch winning only six of their first twelve games. Five consecutive wins to end the regular season left them in position to make a finals assault. Balmain's Bob Lulham set a new record for the highest number of tries by a player in a debut season with a tally of 28 tries in eighteen matches. This remains that club's record for tries in a season.

== Teams ==
The addition of two teams, Manly-Warringah and Parramatta, saw ten teams from across the city contest during the 1947 premiership, the first expansion of the League since Canterbury-Bankstown’s introduction in 1935. Manly had been competing for a number of years in the NSWRFL's President's Cup (3rd grade) competition and had been assured by the league of first grade status should they win the Presidents Cup, which they finally did in 1946. After Cumberland’s demise from the league, pressure began to build in the area for another team in the NSWRFL in the 1930s, though this died down during World War II and a Parramatta district club was not proposed again until 1946 when the club was successfully admitted into the Premiership.

- Balmain, formed on January 23, 1908, at Balmain Town Hall
- Canterbury-Bankstown, formed on September 25, 1934
- Eastern Suburbs, formed on January 24, 1908, at Paddington Town Hall
- Manly-Warringah admitted in 1947
- Newtown, formed on January 14, 1908
- North Sydney, formed on February 7, 1908
- Parramatta, formed in November 1946
- South Sydney, formed on January 17, 1908, at Redfern Town Hall
- St. George, formed on November 8, 1920, at Kogarah School of Arts
- Western Suburbs, formed on February 4, 1908

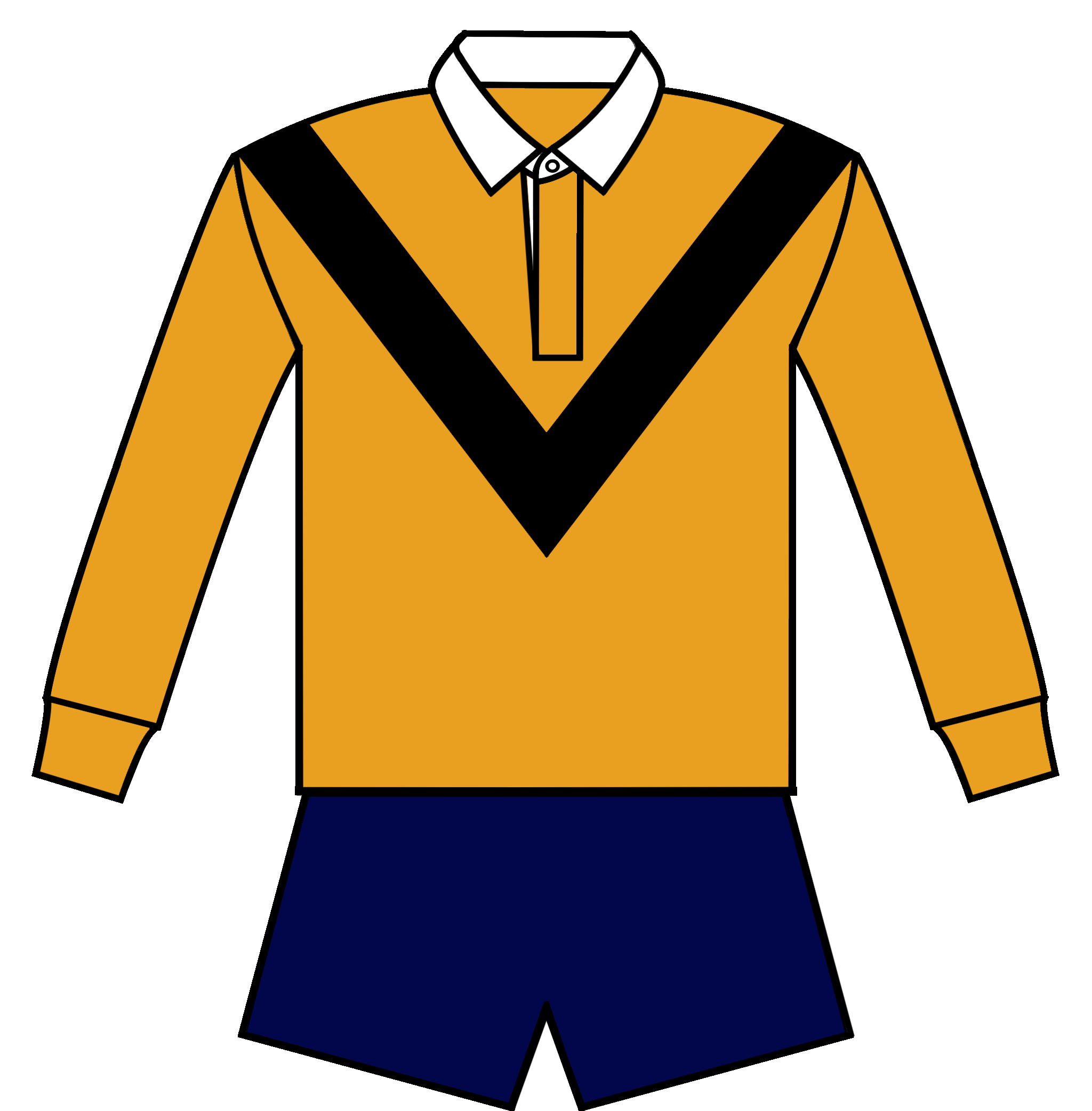
Balmain 40th season Ground(s): Leichhardt Oval, Sydney Sports Ground; Coach: Norm Robinson; Captain: Tom Bourke

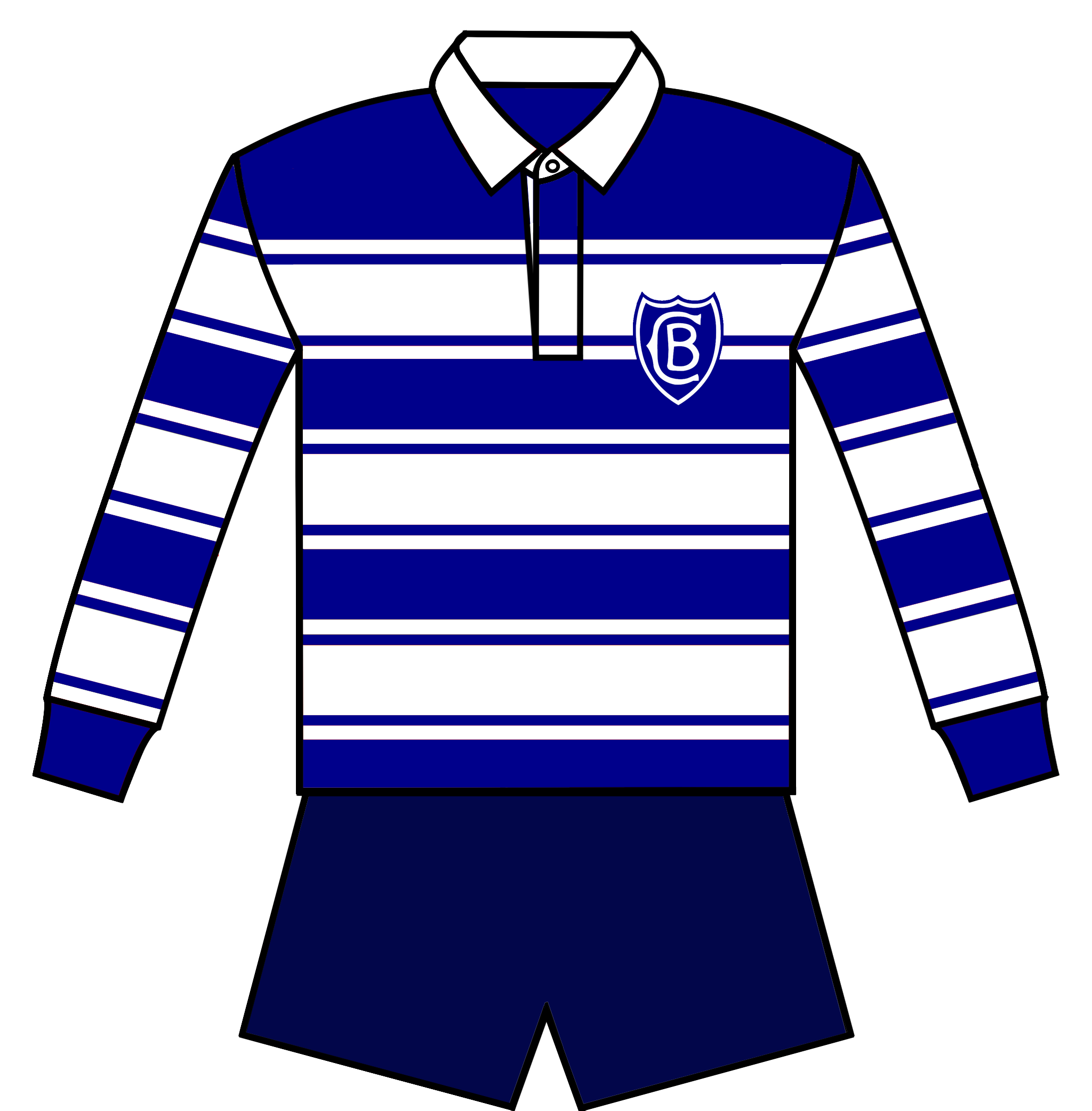
Canterbury-Bankstown 13th season Ground(s): Belmore Oval, Sydney Showground, Sydney Sports Ground; Coach: Ross McKinnon; Captain: Henry Porter

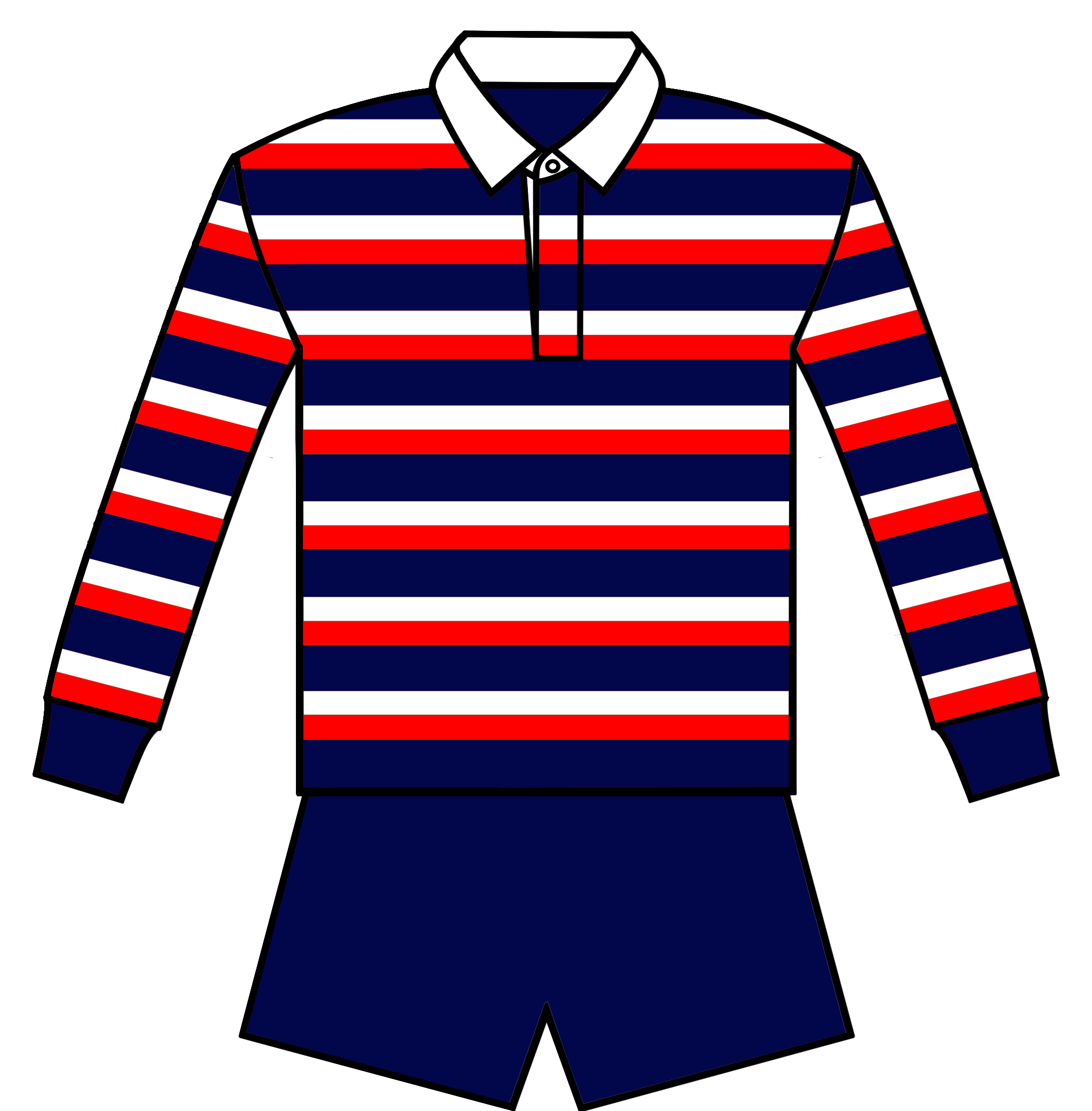
Eastern Suburbs 40th season Ground(s): Pratten Park, Sydney Sports Ground; Coach: Arthur Halloway; Captain: Sel Lisle

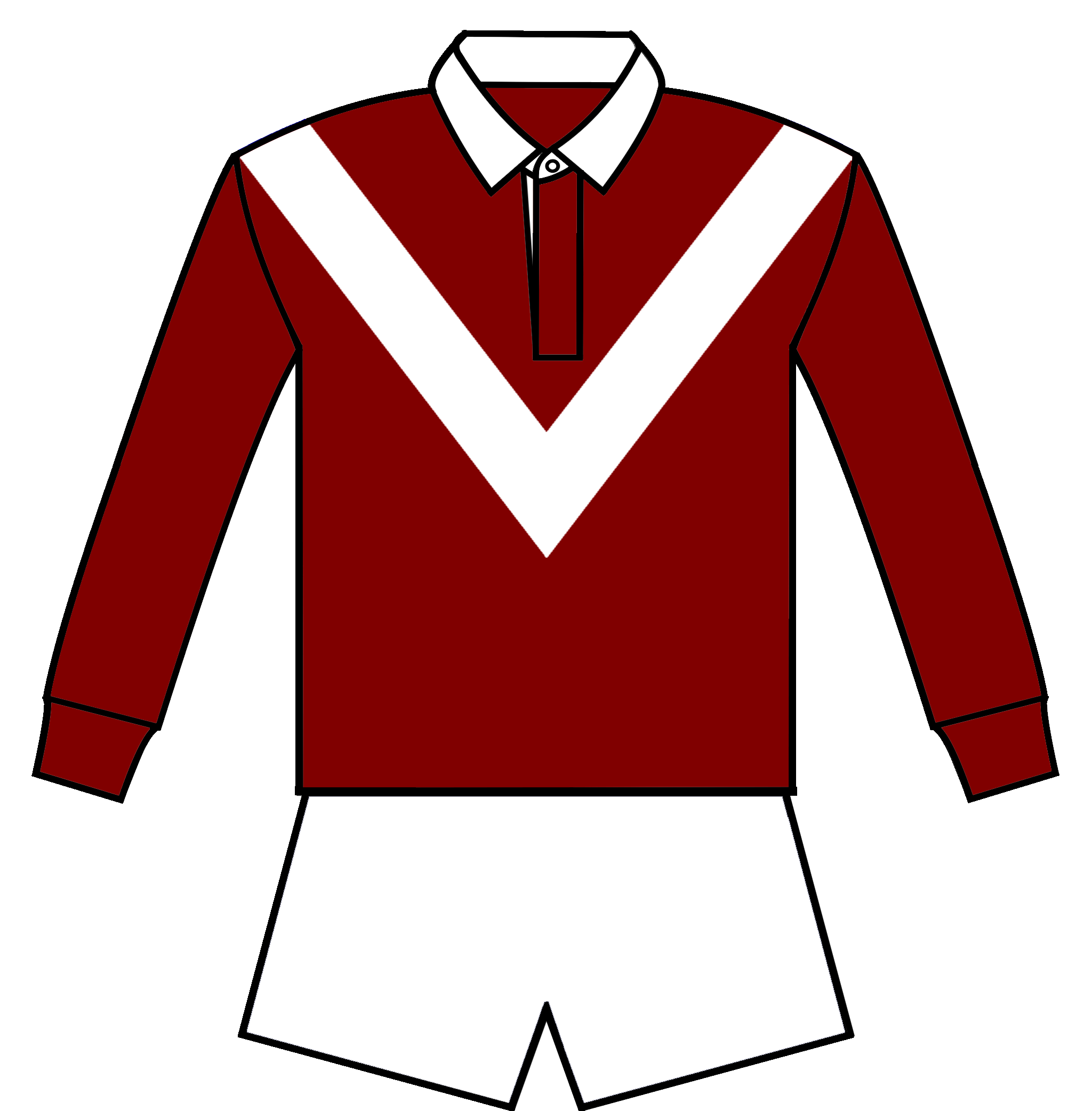
Manly-Warringah 1st season Ground(s): Brookvale Oval; Coach: Harold Johnson & Ray Stehr; Captain: Max Whitehead

Newtown 40th season Ground(s): Erskineville Oval; Captain-coach: Frank Farrell

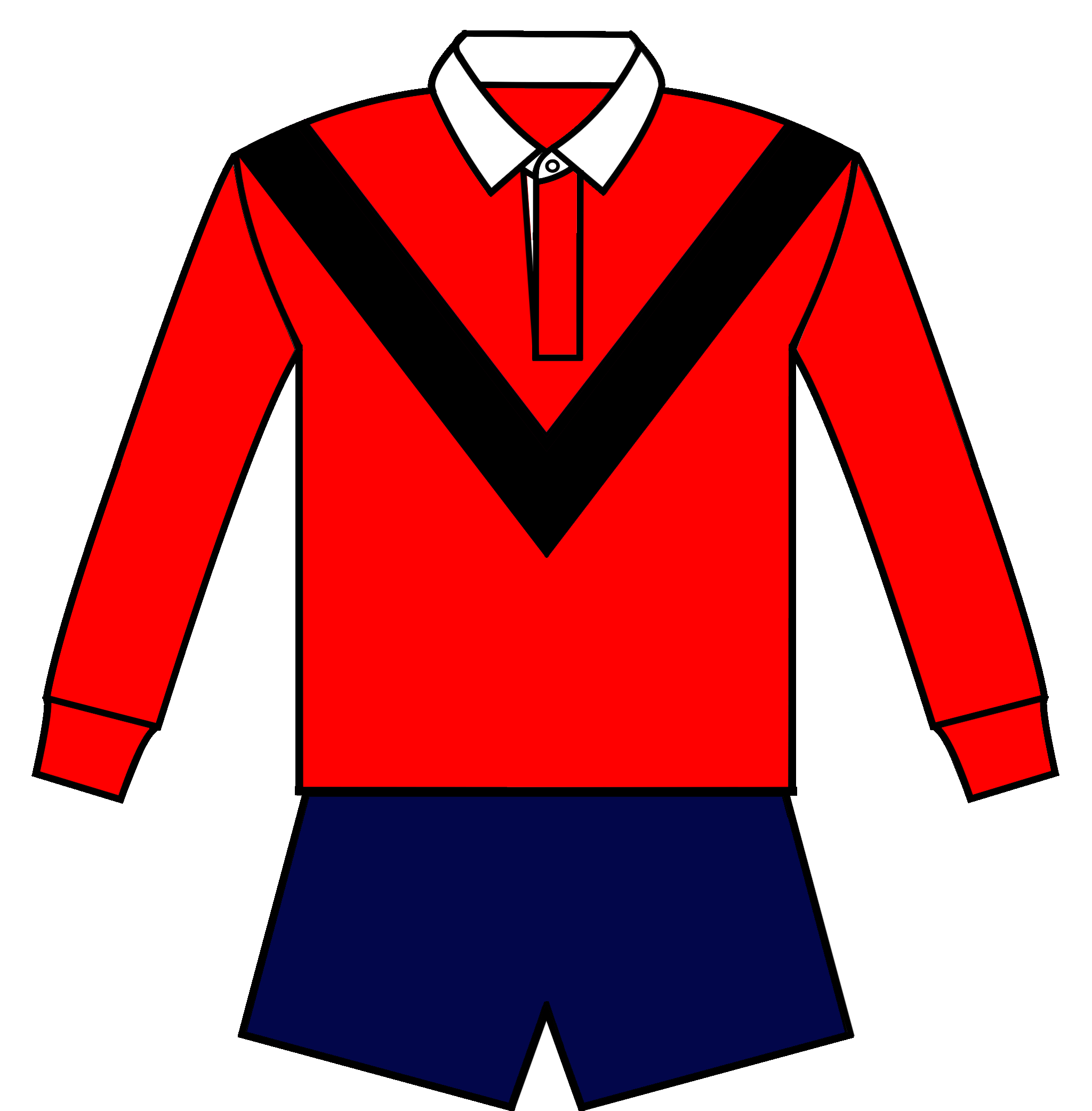
North Sydney 40th season Ground(s): North Sydney Oval, Sydney Showground; Coach: Cliff Pearce; Captain: Tom Kirk

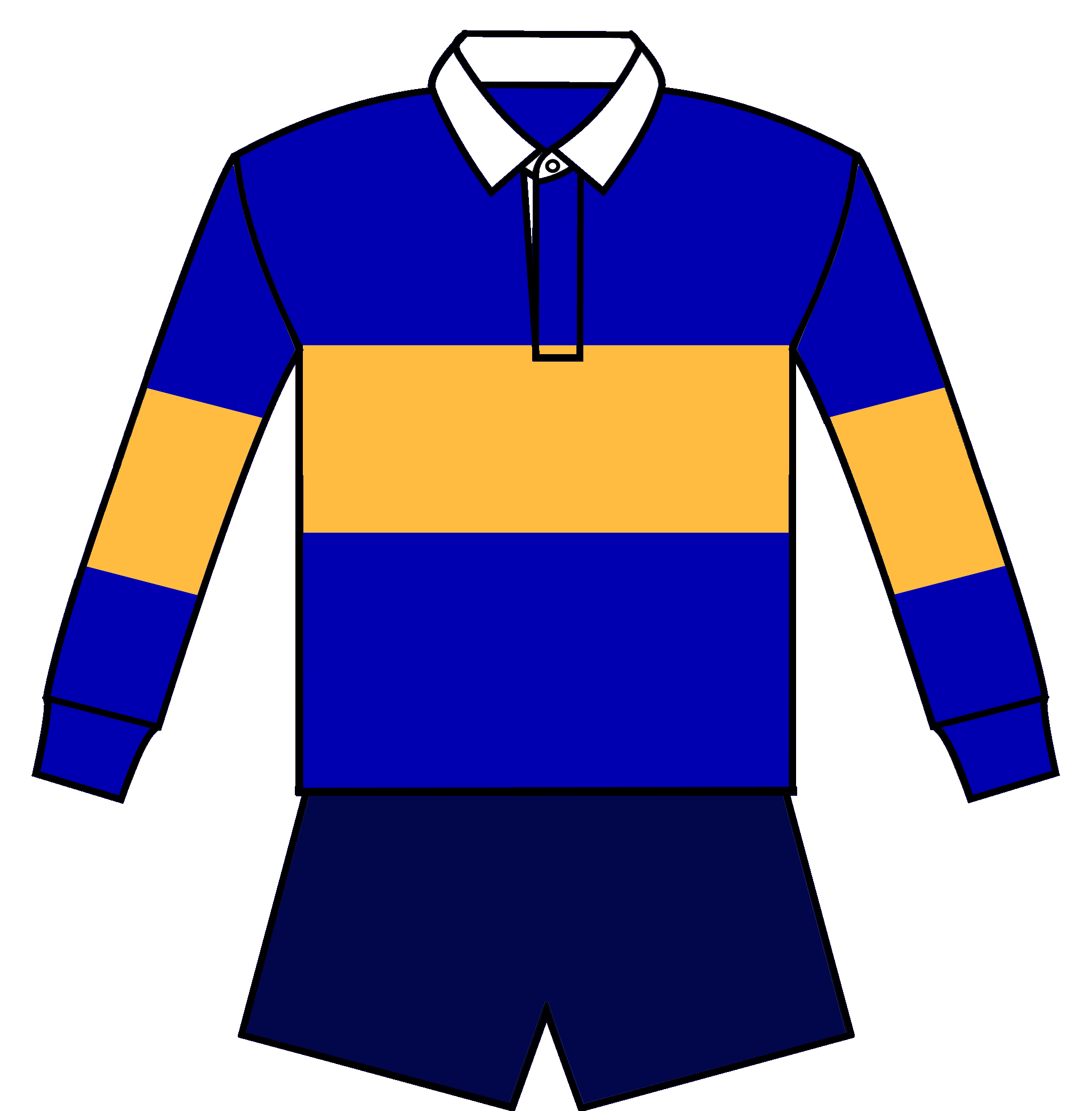
Parramatta 1st season Ground(s): Cumberland Oval; Coach: Frank McMillan; Captain: Bob Andrews

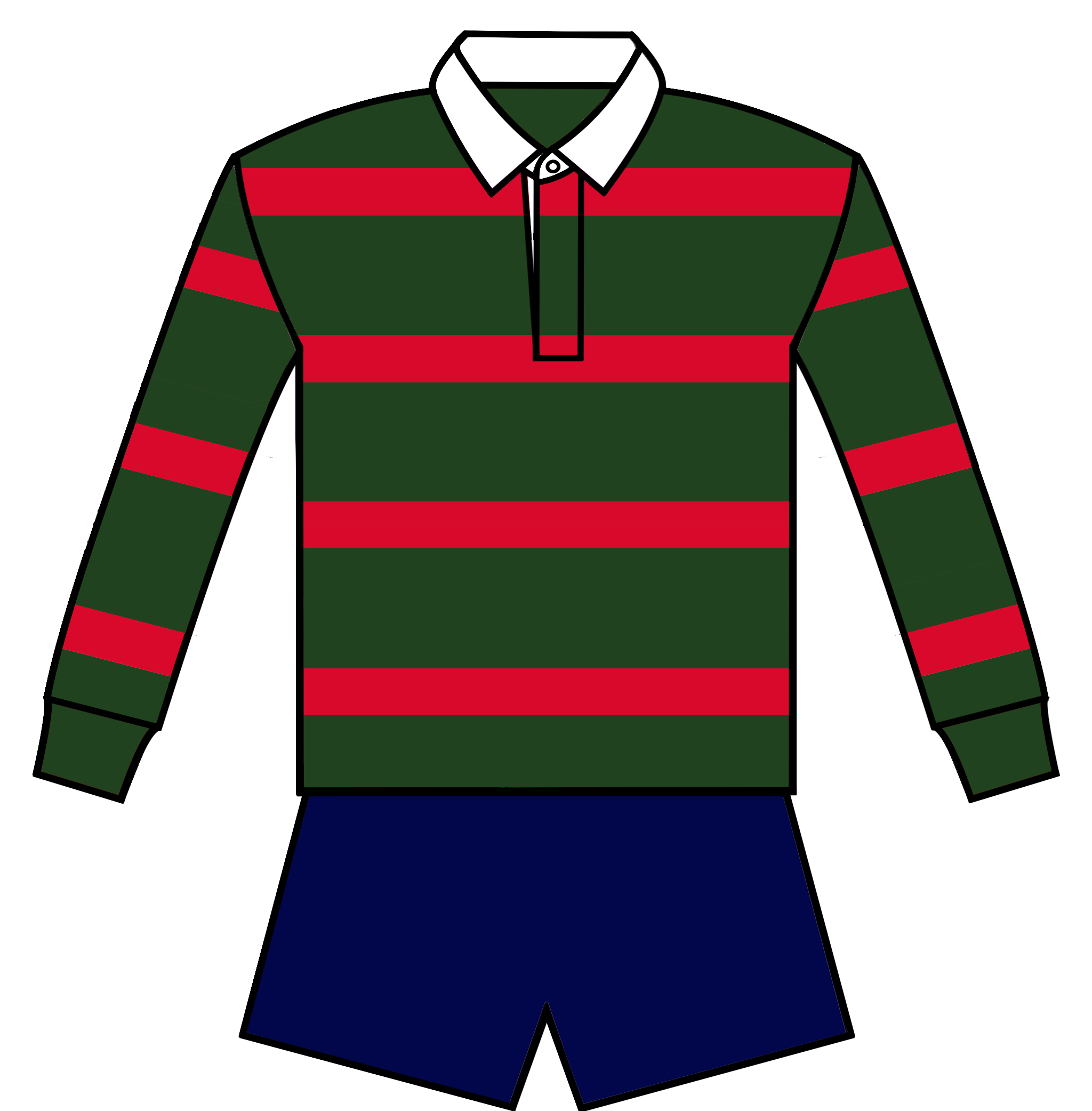
South Sydney 40th season Ground(s): Pratten Park, Sydney Sports Ground; Coach: Dave Watson; Captain: Jack Rayner

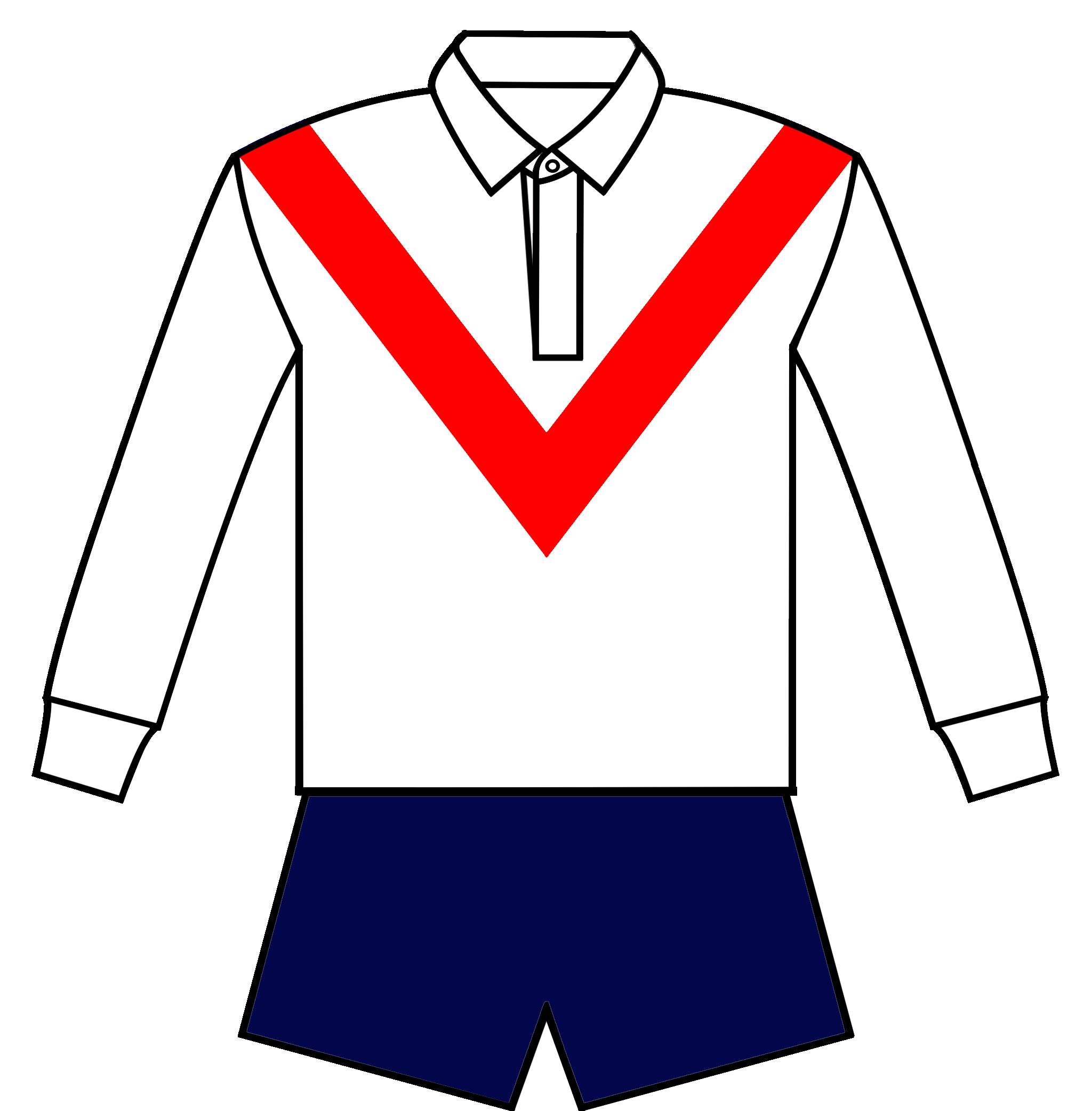
St. George 27th season Ground(s): Hurstville Oval; Coach: Arthur Justice, Charlie Lynch (from May); Captain: Doug McRitchie

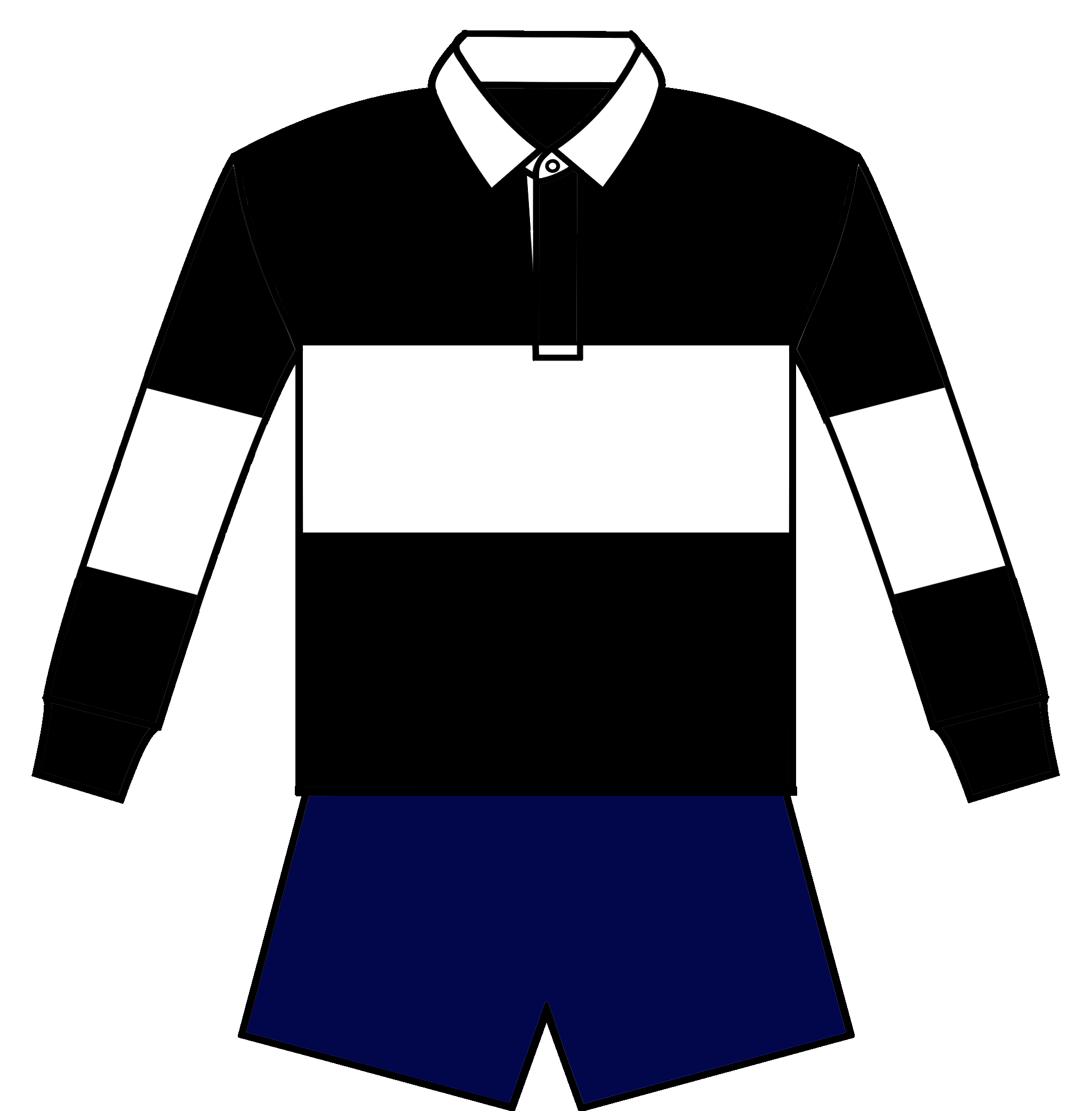
Western Suburbs 40th season Ground(s): Pratten Park, Sydney Sports Ground; Coach: Frank Burge; Captain: Eric Bennett

== Ladder ==
	Team	Pld	W	D	L	PF	PA	PD	Pts
1	Canterbury	18	13	1	4	366	272	+94	27
2	Balmain	18	12	0	6	342	265	+77	24
3	Newtown	18	11	1	6	375	302	+73	23
4	St. George	18	11	0	7	353	272	+81	22
5	Western Suburbs	18	11	0	7	295	253	+42	22
6	North Sydney	18	9	1	8	287	278	+9	19
7	South Sydney	18	9	0	9	314	328	-14	18
8	Eastern Suburbs	18	5	1	12	270	316	-46	11
9	Manly	18	4	0	14	242	364	-122	8
10	Parramatta	18	3	0	15	230	424	-194	6

== Finals ==
Home	Score	Away	Match Information
Home	Score	Away	Date and Time	Venue	Referee	Crowd
Playoff
St. George	5–10	Western Suburbs	27 August 1947	Sydney Sports Ground		13,552
Semifinals
Canterbury	25–15	Newtown	30 August 1947	Sydney Cricket Ground	George Bishop	36,303
Balmain	27–16	Western Suburbs	6 September 1947	Sydney Sports Ground	Tom McMahon	29,375
Final
Canterbury	19–25	Balmain	13 September 1947	Sydney Sports Ground	Jack O'Brien	34,994
Grand Final
Canterbury	9–13	Balmain	20 September 1947	Sydney Sports Ground	Jack O'Brien	29,292

=== Grand final ===
Canterbury-Bankstown	Position	Balmain
13. Dick Johnson	FB	1. Jack McCullough
14. Jeff Simmonds	WG	2. Robert Lulham
11. Eddie Tracey	CE	3. Pat Devery
10. Norm Young	CE	14. Joe Jorgenson
9. Morrie Murphy	WG	15. Arthur Patton
8. Roy Hasson	FE	4. George Williams
7. Bruce Hopkins	HB	32. Des Bryan
1. Eddie Burns	PR	34. John Brannigan
56. Roy Kirkaldy	HK	9. Herb Gilbert Jnr
3. Henry Porter (c)	PR	8. Jack Spencer
25. Alister Clarke	SR	24. Sid Ryan
58. Ken Charlton	SR	11. Harry Bath
6. Len Holmes	LK	7. Tom Bourke (c)
Ross McKinnon	Coach	Norm Robinson

The Tigers had strung together seven consecutive wins including a preliminary final victory over minor premiers Canterbury in their attempt at a second straight premiership. Canterbury exercised their “right of challenge” after losing the final and called for a Grand Final decider.

The formidable Canterbury front row of Eddie Burns, Roy Kirkaldy and Henry Porter were combining in their tenth season for over one hundred and fifty appearances as a scrum front trio. They led a punishing Berries defence and gave their side a better-than-even chance of possession in the scrum contests.

Balmain's star international centre and Kangaroo captain Joe Jorgenson had played and coached on a country contract in Junee in 1947 but returned to the Tigers reserve-grade in time for the semifinals. The Grand Final marked his sole first-grade appearance of the season. Balmain's Test five-eighth Pat Devery was the nominated match kicker but after several misses he passed over to Jorgenson who kicked three penalties to keep Balmain in the game and trailing 9–6 with ten minutes to go.

Then Jorgenson crashed over for a try under the posts and after receiving medical attention he converted his own goal to give the Tigers an 11–9 lead. A final 45-yard penalty goal then sealed the match for the Tigers at 13–9 with Jorgenson scoring all of Balmain's points and being chaired victorious from the field.

Balmain 13 (Tries: Jorgenson. Goals: Jorgenson 5 )

defeated

Canterbury-Bankstown 9 (Tries: Hasson. Goals: Johnson 2, Hasson)

Joe Jorgenson

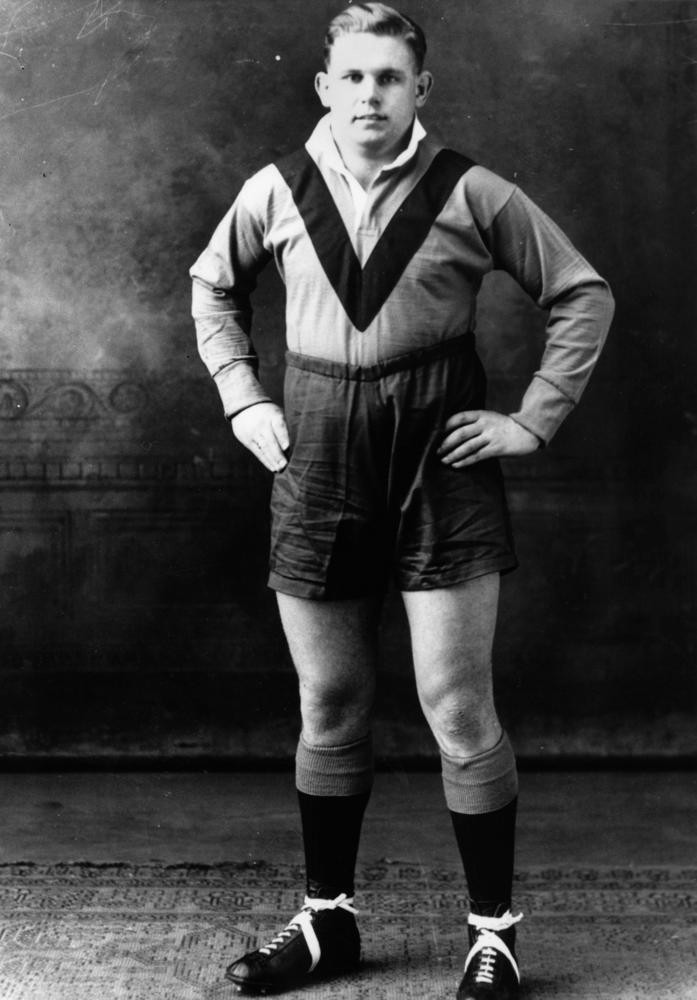
Harry Bath

== Player statistics ==
The following statistics are as of the conclusion of Round 18.

Top 5 point scorers

Points	Player	Tries	Goals	Field Goals
130	Bill Keato	0	65	0
126	Jack Lindwall	14	42	0
116	Tom Kirk	0	58	0
114	Pat Devery	6	48	0
81	Roy Hasson	11	24	0

Top 5 try scorers

Tries	Player
25	Bobby Lulham
14	Jack Lindwall
13	Morrie Murphy
13	Len Smith
13	Norm Jacobson

Top 5 goal scorers

Goals	Player
65	Bill Keato
58	Tom Kirk
48	Pat Devery
42	Jack Lindwall
33	Frank Bonner
