= 1946 NSWRFL season =

Rugby league competition

1946 New South Wales Rugby Football League
- Teams: 8
- Premiers: Balmain (9th title)
- Minor premiers: St. George (2nd title)
- Matches played: 60
- Points scored: 1956
- Top points scorer(s): Tom Kirk (122)
- Wooden spoon: South Sydney (2nd spoon)
- Top try-scorer(s): Jack Lindwall (16)

The 1946 New South Wales Rugby Football League premiership was the thirty-ninth season of Sydney’s top-level rugby league competition, Australia’s first. Eight teams from across the city contested during the season which culminated in Balmain’s victory over St. George in the premiership final.

== Season summary ==
The South Sydney club did not win a single match in 1946, continuing a losing streak that started in round 8, 1945 and which would run till round 1, 1947.

Eastern Suburbs’ Lionel Cooper took out the New South Wales “Player of the Year” award.

=== Teams ===
- Balmain, formed on January 23, 1908, at Balmain Town Hall
- Canterbury-Bankstown
- Eastern Suburbs, formed on January 24, 1908, at Paddington Town Hall
- Newtown, formed on January 14, 1908
- North Sydney, formed on February 7, 1908
- South Sydney, formed on January 17, 1908, at Redfern Town Hall
- St. George, formed on November 8, 1920, at Kogarah School of Arts
- Western Suburbs, formed on February 4, 1908

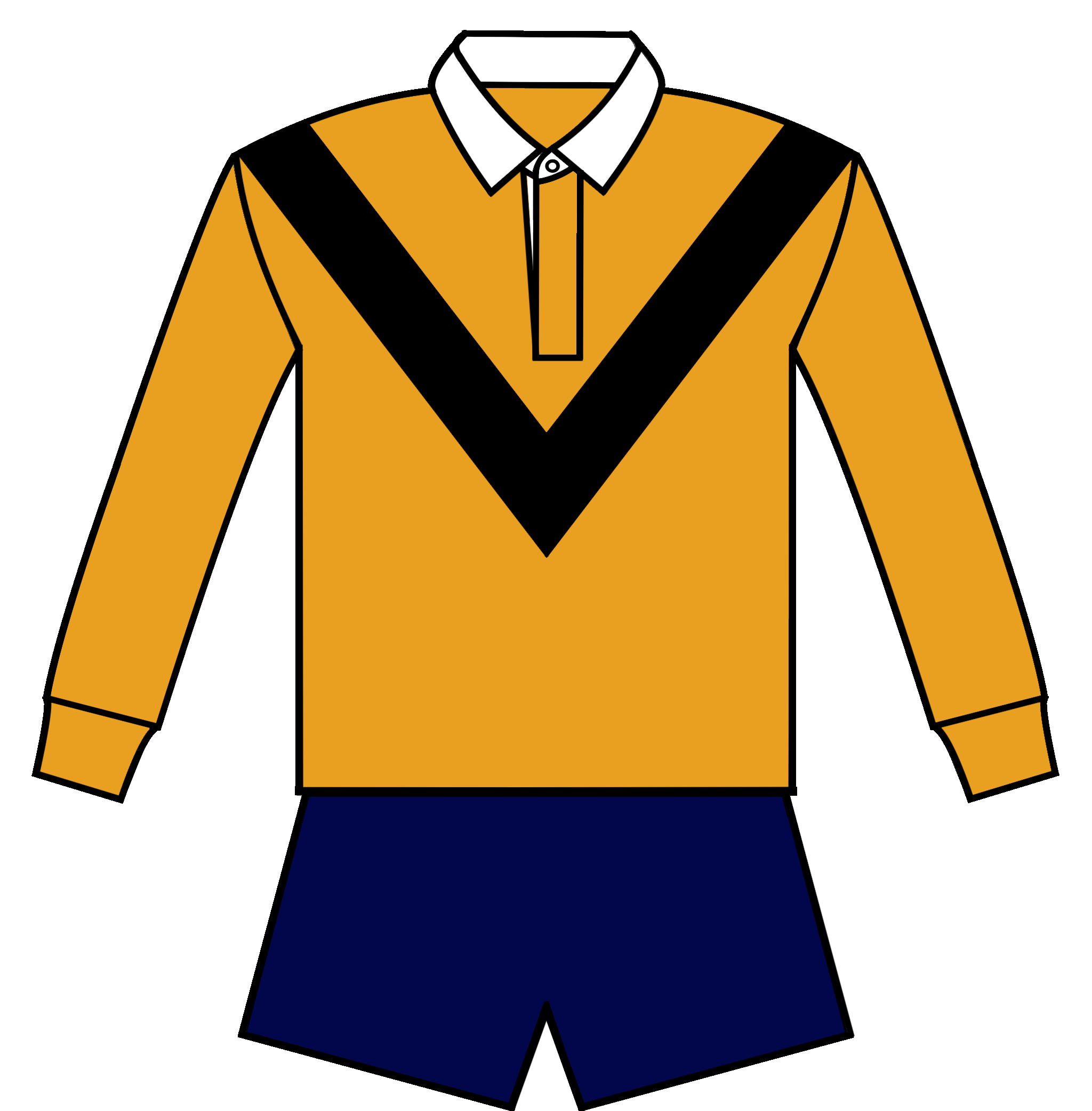
Balmain 39th season Ground: Leichhardt Oval; Coach: Norm Robinson; Captain: Tom Bourke

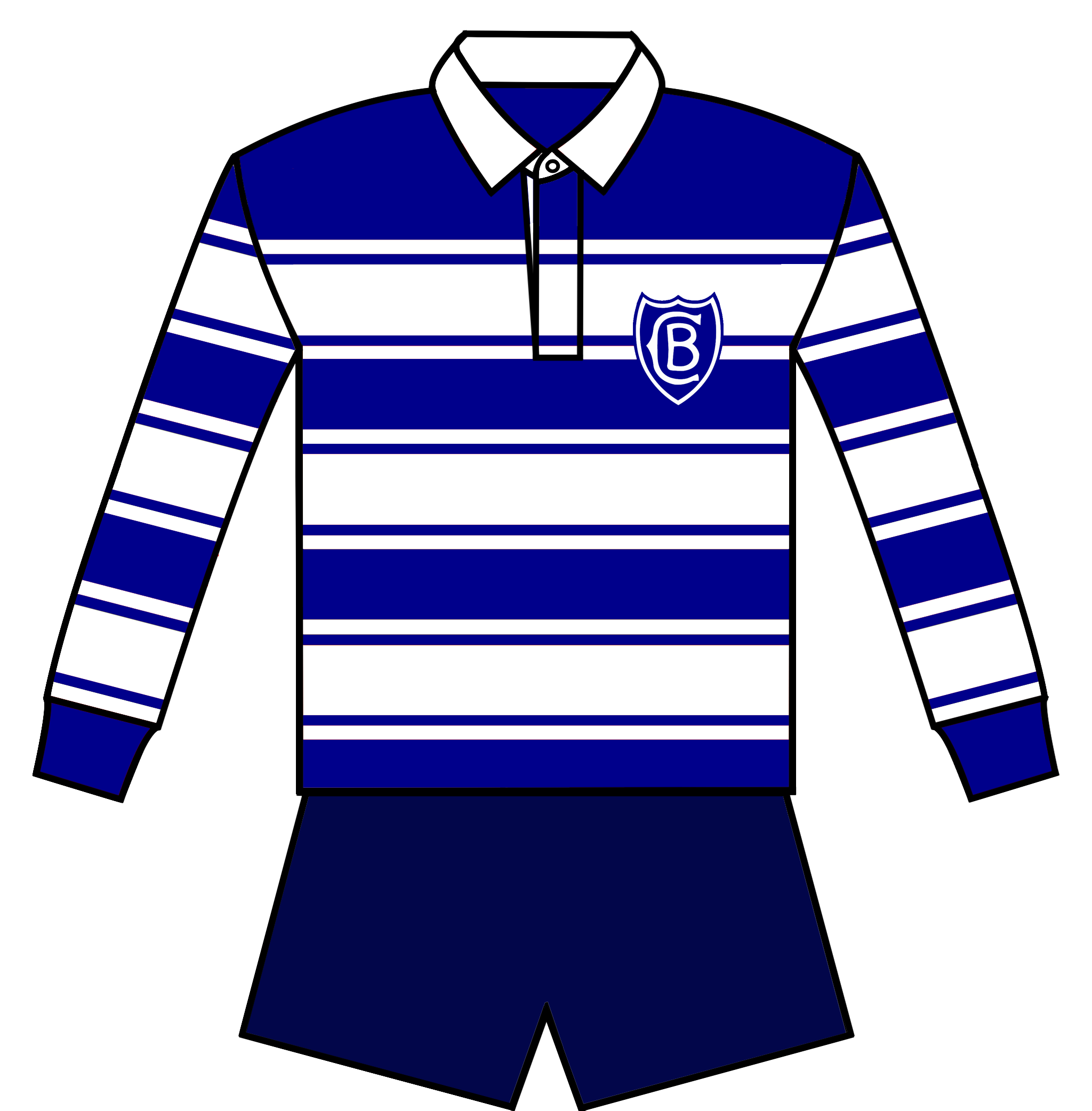
Canterbury-Bankstown 12th season Ground: Belmore Oval; Coach: Ross McKinnon; Captain: Ron Bailey

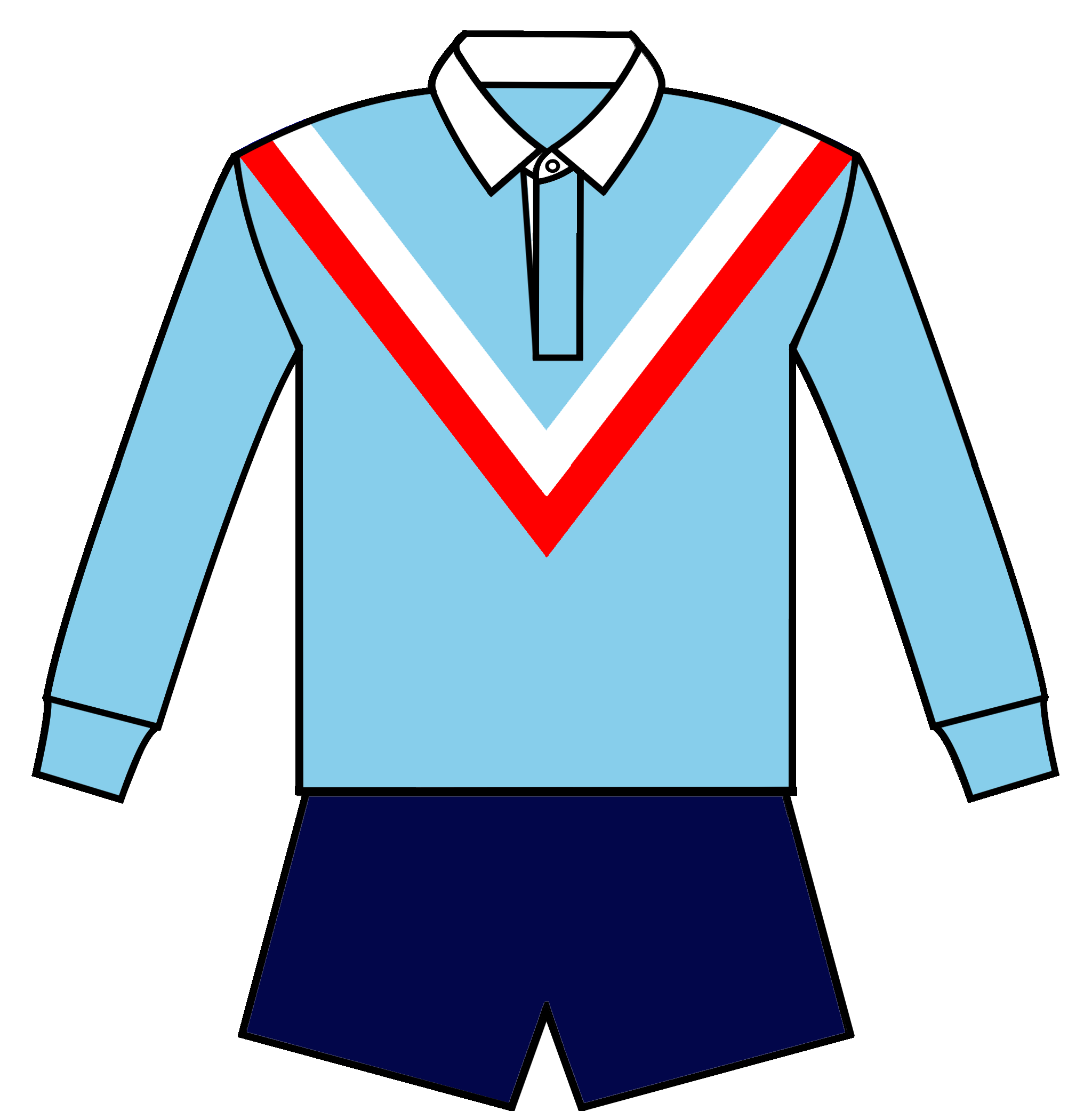
Eastern Suburbs 39th season Ground: Sydney Sports Ground; Captain-Coach: Ray Stehr

Newtown 39th season Ground: Henson Park; Coach: Frank Farrell & Len Smith; Captain: Frank Farrell

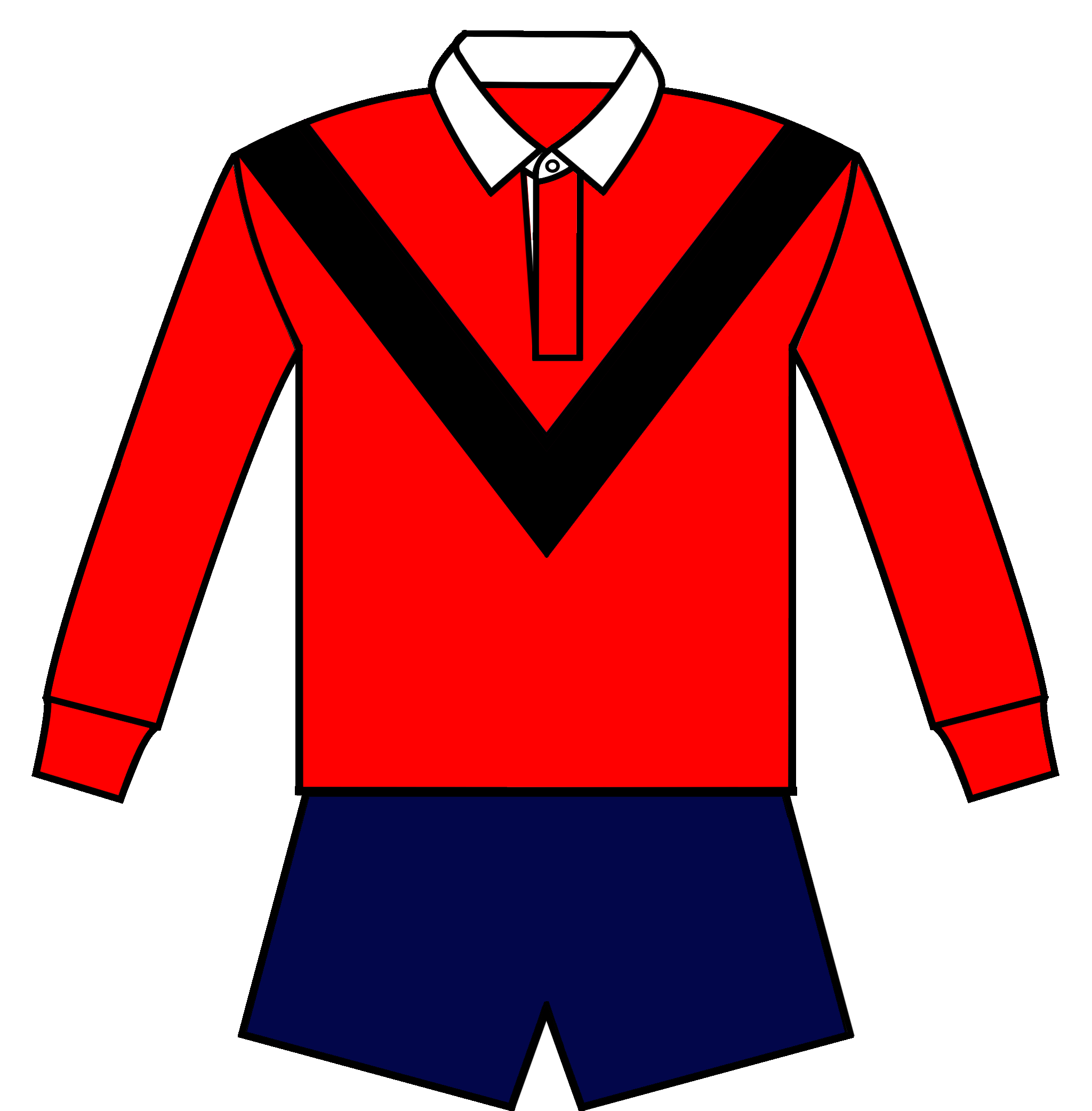
North Sydney 39th season Ground: North Sydney Oval; Coach: Harry Forbes; Captain: Jim Scoular

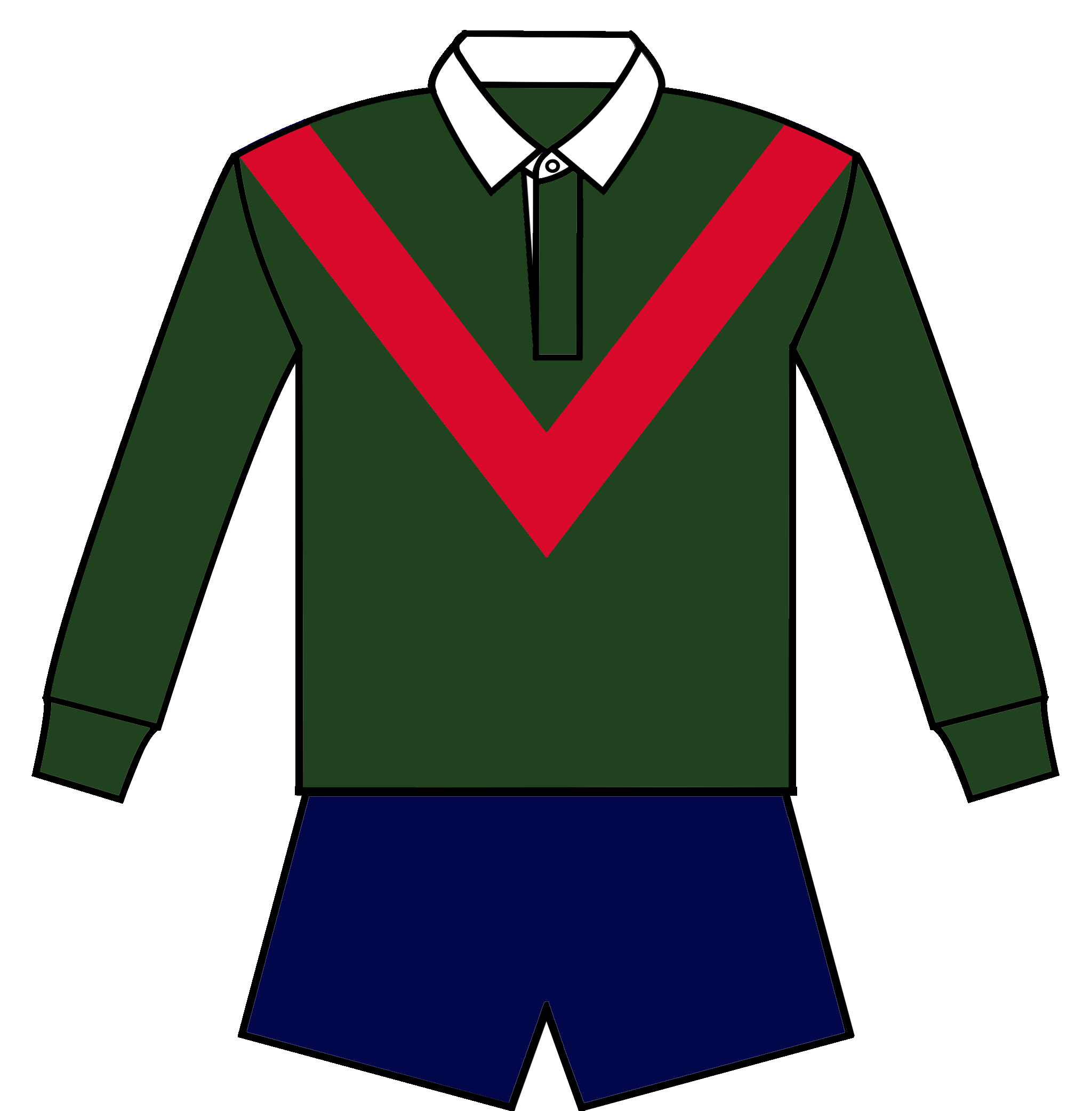
South Sydney 39th season Ground: Sydney Sports Ground; Coach: Arthur Hennessy; Captain: Clem Kennedy

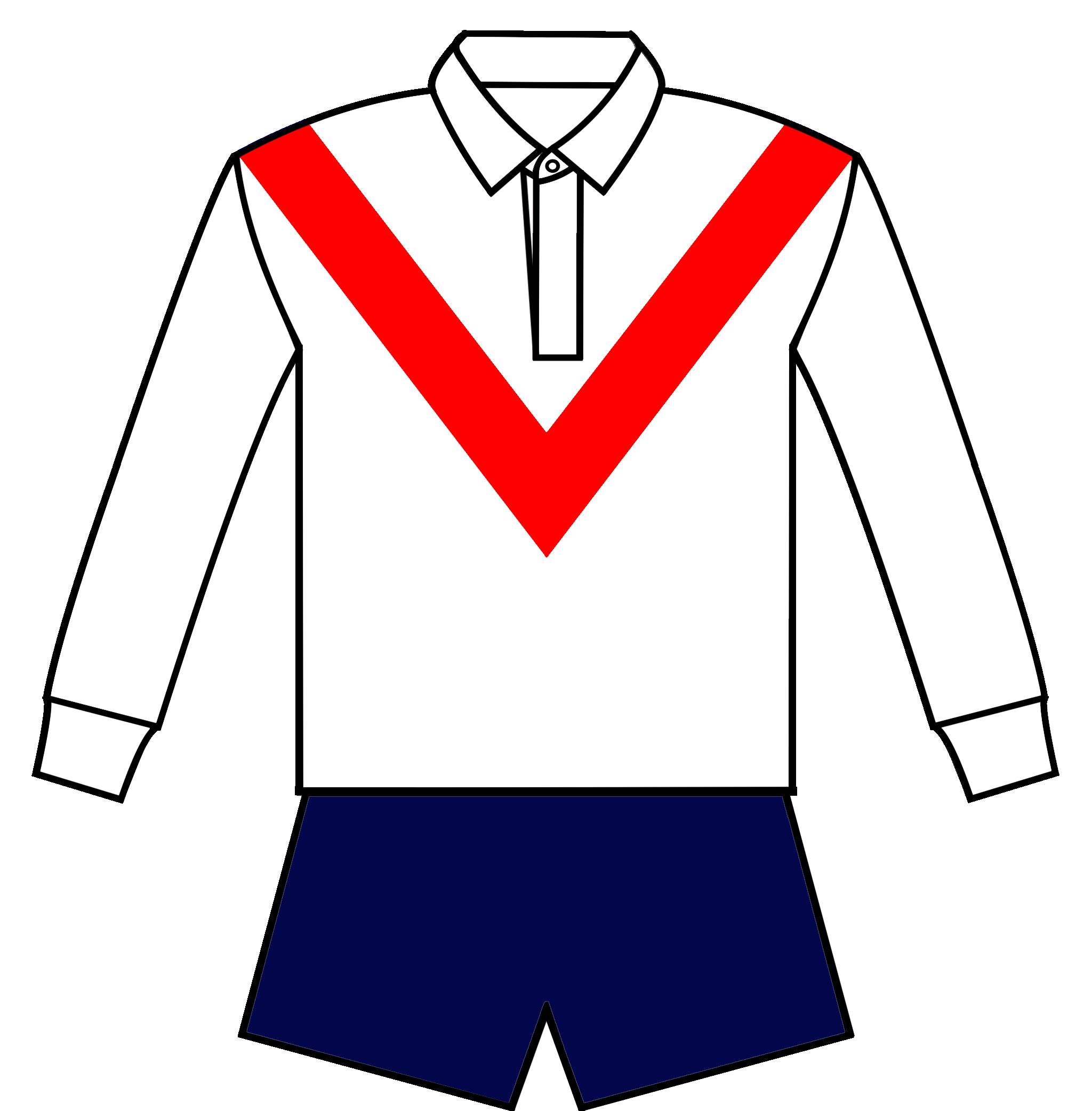
St. George 26th season Ground: Hurstville Oval; Captain-Coach: Herb Narvo

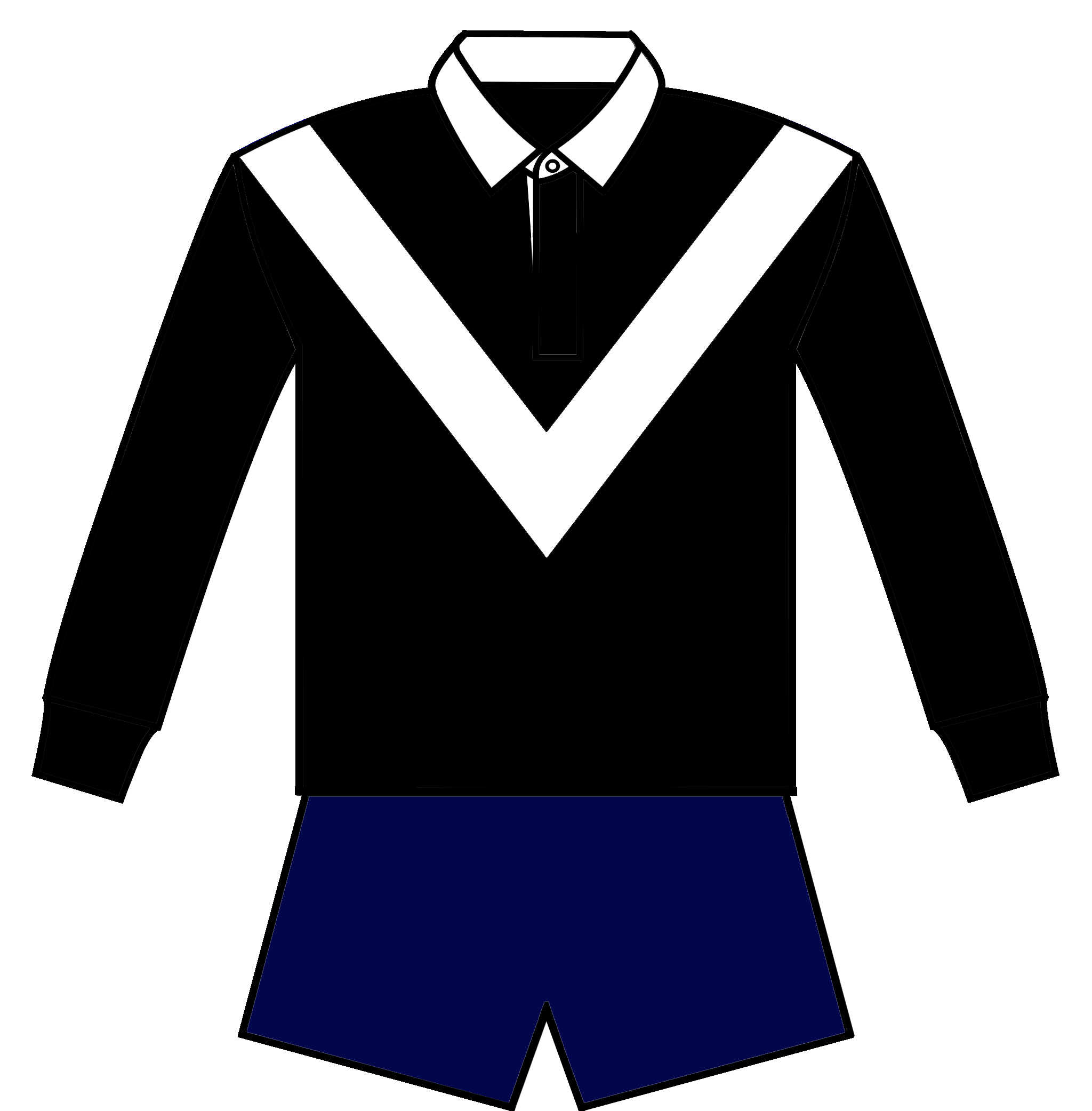
Western Suburbs 39th season Ground: Pratten Park; Captain-Coach: Jack Walsh

=== Ladder ===
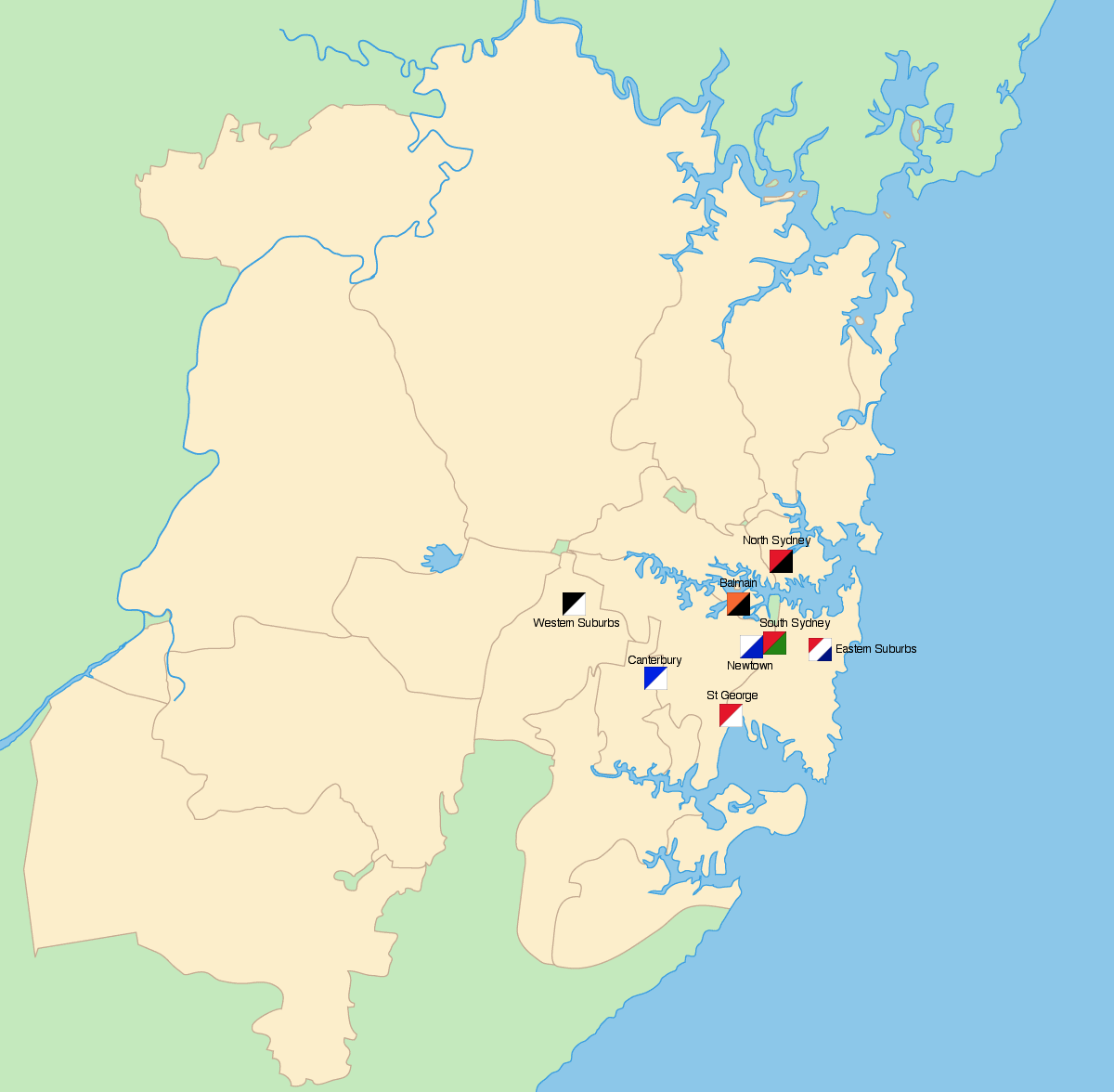
The geographical locations of the teams that contested the 1946 premiership across Sydney.

	Team	Pld	W	D	L	PF	PA	PD	Pts
1	St. George	14	11	0	3	264	203	+61	22
2	Newtown	14	10	0	4	294	189	+105	20
3	Balmain	14	9	0	5	279	193	+86	18
4	Canterbury	14	8	1	5	212	196	+16	17
5	Eastern Suburbs	14	8	0	6	213	174	+39	16
6	North Sydney	14	5	0	9	248	283	-35	10
7	Western Suburbs	14	4	1	9	224	267	-43	9
8	South Sydney	14	0	0	14	124	353	-229	0

== Finals ==
With just two rounds remaining, Newtown looked on track for the minor premiership until they lost to Eastern Suburbs and then Balmain in the two final rounds of the year. This left St. George to take the minor premiership, and with it, a guaranteed place in a final. This proved costly for Newtown, who were narrowly beaten by Canterbury-Bankstown in the semifinal eliminator, meaning they were out of the competition. St. George also lost their first round match, meaning they immediately got sent into the Grand final against the winner of a Balmain and Canterbury-Bankstown match, which Balmain won by a point.

Home	Score	Away	Match Information
Home	Score	Away	Date and Time	Venue	Referee	Crowd
Semifinals
St. George	14–22	Balmain	24 August 1946	Sydney Cricket Ground	George Bishop	34,408
Newtown	10–12	Canterbury-Bankstown	31 August 1946	Sydney Cricket Ground	Jack O'Brien	28,012
Preliminary Final
Balmain	8–7	Canterbury-Bankstown	7 September 1946	Sydney Cricket Ground	Tom McMahon	36,445
Grand Final
St. George	12–13	Balmain	14 September 1946	Sydney Sports Ground	George Bishop	32,296

=== Grand Final ===
St George	Position	Balmain
44. Ray Lindwall	FB	30. Jack McCullough
18. Noel Jones	WG	2. Arthur Patton
10. Doug McRitchie	CE	6. Pat Devery
8. Fred Brown	CE	4. Tom Bourke (c)
40. Jack Lindwall	WG	3. Joe Jorgenson
48. Don Graham	FE	19. George Williams
7. Max Hayward	HB	7. Stan Ponchard
1. Jack Munn	PR	10. Hilton Kidd
2. Ken Banks	HK	9. Herb Gilbert Jnr
3. Jack McPherson	PR	8. Jack Spencer
4. Jim Hale	SR	25. Fred de Belin
5. Herb Narvo (c/c)	SR	11. Harry Bath
22. Chick Donnelley	LK	13. Jack Hampstead
	Coach	Norm Robinson

In spite of St George’s status as minor premiers, Balmain were Grand Final favourites due to their comprehensive routing of the Dragons in the first semi-final. The decider, played on Saturday 14 September, was a closely fought contest.

A series of dubious decisions by referee George Bishop gave Balmain an advantage. There was a disallowed try to St George and two Balmain tries which came off what appeared to be forward passes, one when Balmain’s Joe Jorgenson scored after receiving a ball that seemed to have been propelled at least a yard forward.

The Dragons came close to victory when late in the game Jack Lindwall scored in the corner but his brother, prospective Test bowler, Ray Lindwall was unable to convert it. Lindwall in fact missed all four conversion attempts on the day.

The Tigers had won seven straight victories to take the premiership.

Tensions of the encounter overflowed after full-time, and at the conclusion of the match Saints forward, Jim Hale went toe to toe with Balmain hooker, Herb Gilbert, Jr, himself a former Dragon. Hale was then attacked by a spectator and an all-in brawl followed.

Balmain 13 (Tries: Jorgenson 2, Patton. Goals: Bourke 2 )

defeated

St George 12 (Tries: J Lindwall 2, Jones, Munn)

Joe Jorgenson

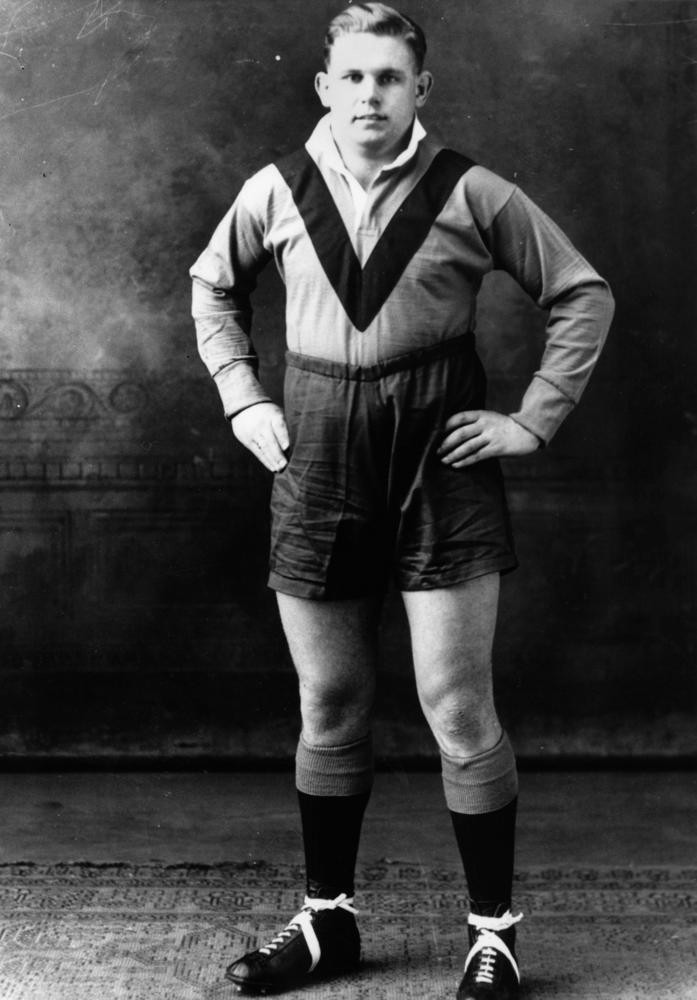
Harry Bath

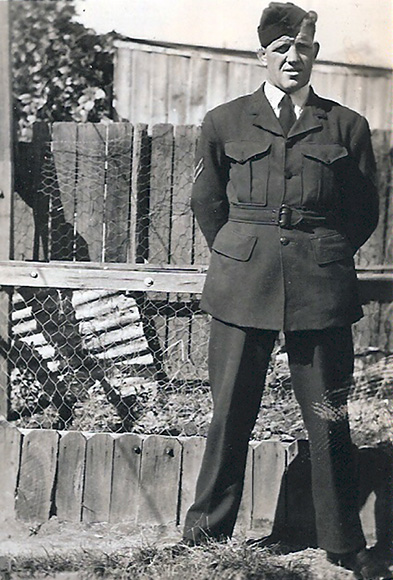
Herb Narvo

== Player statistics ==
The following statistics are as of the conclusion of Round 14.

Top 5 point scorers

Points	Player	Tries	Goals	Field Goals
120	Tom Kirk	2	57	0
84	Bill Keato	0	42	0
77	Dick Dunn	1	37	0
68	Roy Hasson	2	31	0
60	Joe Jorgenson	4	24	0

Top 5 try scorers

Tries	Player
14	Jack Lindwall
12	Cyril McMahon
11	Johnny Bliss
10	Denis Boocker
9	Len Smith

Top 5 goal scorers

Goals	Player
57	Tom Kirk
42	Bill Keato
37	Dick Dunn
31	Roy Hasson
28	Pat Morgan
