= John Spencer =

John Spencer may refer to:

== Earls ==
- John Spencer, 1st Earl Spencer (1734–1783), MP for Warwick 1756–1761
- John Spencer, 3rd Earl Spencer (1782–1845), British politician
- John Spencer, 5th Earl Spencer (1835–1910), British politician
- John Spencer, 8th Earl Spencer (1924–1992), father of Diana, Princess of Wales

== Politicians ==
- John Spencer (courtier) (died 1417), a servant of Henry V, MP for Suffolk, and High Sheriff of Norfolk and Suffolk in 1416
- Sir John Spencer (1455–1522), English landowner in Northamptonshire
- Sir John Spencer (sheriff) (1524–1586), MP for Northamptonshire and High Sheriff of Northamptonshire
- Sir John Spencer (died 1599) (1549–1600), MP for Northampton, 1572 and High Sheriff of Northamptonshire 1578,1590
- John Spencer (Lord Mayor of London) (died 1610), merchant and Lord Mayor of London
- John Spencer (speaker) (1666–1743), politician from Rhode Island colony
- John Spencer (British politician) (1708–1746), father of the 1st Earl Spencer
- John Spencer (1767–1831), MP for Wilton
- John Canfield Spencer (1788–1855), American politician
- John Spencer (mayor) (born 1946), former mayor of Yonkers, New York and an unsuccessful candidate for the United States Senate
- John W. Spencer (1864–1939), Justice of the Supreme Court of Indiana

== Sportsmen ==
- John Spencer (rugby, born 1880) (1880–1936), New Zealand rugby player
- Johnny Spencer (1897–1984), American Negro leagues baseball player
- John Spencer (footballer, born 1898) (1898–?), English football player for Stoke
- John Spencer (Australian footballer) (1927–1998), Australian rules footballer
- John Spencer (footballer, born 1934) (1934–2007), English football player for Sheffield United
- John Spencer (snooker player) (1935–2006), English snooker player
- John Spencer (American football) (1937–2021), American college football coach
- John Spencer (rugby league, born 1946) (1946–2021), Australian rugby league player
- John Spencer (rugby union, born 1947), former English national rugby union team captain
- John Spencer (cricketer, born 1949), former Sussex cricketer
- John Spencer (cricketer, born 1954), former Wiltshire cricketer
- John Spencer (Scottish footballer) (born 1970), Scottish international football player and manager

== Others ==
- John A. Spencer (inventor) - ubiquitous bimetal snap-action temperature sensor
- John Spenser or Spencer (1559–1614), one of the translators of the authorized version (1611) of the Bible and president of Corpus Christi College, Oxford
- John Spencer (priest) (1630–1693), English clergyman and scholar, Master of Corpus Christi College, Cambridge
- Pseudonym of William Edward Vickers (1889–1965), English mystery writer
- John Spencer (actor) (1946–2005), American actor in television series' including L.A. Law and The West Wing
- John Spencer (boat designer) (1931–1996), New Zealand architect and boat designer
- John H. Spencer (1907–2005), historian and advisor to Ethiopia
- John O. Spencer (1857–1947), fifth president of Morgan College
- Henk van Broekhoven, later known as John Spencer, Dutch singer, see The Dynamic Rockers
- John Spencer (businessman) (1934 or 1935–2016), New Zealand business magnate
- John Spencer (military officer), American military officer, researcher and author
- John Walton Spencer (1843–1912), American nature educator

== See also ==
- Jon Spencer (born 1965), American rock musician
- John Spencer-Churchill (disambiguation)
- John Spenser (disambiguation)
- John Spencer & Co, British paperback publisher
- Jack Spencer (disambiguation)
