= 2009 Salford City Reds season =

Salford City Reds competed in their eleventh Super League season in their 137th year. They also competed in the 2009 Challenge Cup.

== Transfers ==
Transfers for 2009 (in)

Nat	Name	Transferred from	Date released
(Australia)	Ray Cashmere	North Queensland Cowboys	October 2008
(New Zealand)	Jeremy Smith	South Sydney Rabbitohs	October 2008
(Australia)	Mark Henry	North Queensland Cowboys	October 2008
(Australia)	Luke Swain	Gold Coast Titans	October 2008
(Samoa)	Willie Talau	St Helens R.F.C.	October 2008
(England)	Rob Parker	Warrington Wolves	October 2008

Transfers for 2009 (out)

Nat	Name	Transferred to	Date released
(England)	Mat Gardner	Harlequins RL	October 2008
(England)	Steve Bannister	Widnes Vikings	October 2008
(England)	Andrew Brocklehurst		October 2008
(England)	Paul Highton	Oldham R.L.F.C.	October 2008
(England)	Chris Borgese		October 2008
(England)	Andy Ballard		October 2008
(England)	Luke Ambler		October 2008
(England)	Daley Williams	Keighley Cougars	October 2008

== Full squad ==
Number	Nat	Player	Position	Previous club
1	(Republic of Ireland)	Karl Fitzpatrick	Full back	Widnes Vikings
2	(Papua New Guinea)	John Wilshire	Wing	Leigh Centurions
3	(Australia)	Mark Henry	Centre	North Queensland Cowboys
4	(Samoa)	Willie Talau	Centre	St. Helens
5	(England)	Paul White	Wing	Wakefield Trinity Wildcats
6	(New Zealand)	Jeremy Smith	Stand off	South Sydney Rabbitohs
7	(England)	Richard Myler	Scrum half	Widnes Vikings
8	(Australia)	Ray Cashmere	Prop	North Queensland Cowboys
9	(England)	Malcolm Alker	Hooker	Wigan St Patricks
10	(Australia)	Craig Stapleton	Prop	Cronulla Sharks
11	(England)	Ian Sibbitt	Second row	Warrington Wolves
12	(England)	Rob Parker	Second row	Warrington Wolves
13	(Australia)	Luke Swain	Loose forward	Gold Coast Titans
14	(England)	Jordan Turner	Loose forward	Salford City Reds
15	(Republic of Ireland)	Stuart Littler	Centre	Leigh Miners Rangers
16	(Samoa)	Phillip Leuluai	Prop	Cronulla Sharks
17	(New Zealand)	Robbie Paul	Half back	Huddersfield Giants
18	(England)	Lee Jewitt	Prop	Wigan Warriors
19	(England)	Stefan Ratchford	Hooker	Salford City Reds
20	(England)	Luke Adamson	Second row	Leigh East
21	(England)	Andrew Thornley	Wing	Salford City Reds
22	(England)	Stephen Nash	Prop	Widnes Vikings
23	(England)	Adam Sidlow	Prop	Widnes Vikings
24	(England)	Dean McGilvray	Centre	St. Helens
25	(England)	Jason Walton	Loose forward	Salford City Reds
26	(England)	Marlon Alker	Centre	Salford City Reds
27	(England)	Lewis Palfrey	Prop	Salford City Reds
28	(England)	Jack Spencer	Half back	Salford City Reds

== Fixtures and results ==
Competition	Round	Opponent	Result	Score	Home/away	Venue	Attendance	Date
Super League XIV	1	Crusaders	Win	28-16	Home	The Willows	4,026	14/02/2009
Super League XIV	2	Wakefield Trinity Wildcats	Loss	29-10	Away	Belle Vue	6,578	22/02/2009
Super League XIV	3	Castleford Tigers	Loss	52-16	Away	The Jungle	7,052	28/02/2009
Super League XIV	4	Harlequins RL	Loss	18-48	Home	The Willows	3,367	06/03/2009
Super League XIV	5	St Helens R.F.C.	Loss	38-12	Away	GPW Recruitment Stadium	9,723	13/03/2009
Super League XIV	6	Wigan Warriors	Loss	12-38	Home	The Willows	7,016	20/03/2009
Super League XIV	7	Hull Kingston Rovers	Loss	48-12	Away	New Craven Park	8,104	29/03/2009
Challenge Cup 2009	4	Hull F.C.	Win	18-22	Away	KC Stadium	8,945	05/04/2009
Super League XIV	8	Warrington Wolves	Win	18-16	Home	The Willows	6,150	10/04/2009
Super League XIV	9	Leeds Rhinos	Win	20-30	Away	Headingley Stadium	14,381	13/04/2009
Super League XIV	10	Catalans Dragons	Loss	38-6	Away	Stade Gilbert Brutus	8,327	18/04/2009
Super League XIV	11	Hull FC	Loss	14-18	Home	The Willows	4,165	25/04/2009
Super League XIV	12	Harlequins RL	Loss	16-24	Neutral	Murrayfield Stadium	29,627	02/05/2009
Challenge Cup 2009	5	Batley Bulldogs	Win	4-66	Away	Mount Pleasant	1,298	10/05/2009
Super League XIV	13	Huddersfield Giants	Win	4-24	Away	Galpharm Stadium	6,903	17/05/2009
Super League XIV	14	Bradford Bulls	Win	18-10	Home	The Willows	4,383	23/05/2009
Challenge Cup 2009	QF	Wigan Warriors	Loss	28-6	Away	JJB Stadium	9,466	29/05/2009
Super League XIV	15	Wigan Warriors	Loss	34-18	Away	JJB Stadium	11,550	05/06/2009
Super League XIV	16	Catalans Dragons	N/A	P-P^{[A]}	Home	The Willows	N/A	12/06/2009
Super League XIV	17	Hull FC	Loss	14-12	Away	KC Stadium	11,218	19/06/2009
Super League XIV	18	Huddersfield Giants	Loss	10-34	Home	The Willows	3,721	26/06/2009
Super League XIV	19	St Helens RLFC	Win	20-10	Home	The Willows	4,808	03/07/2009
Super League XIV	20	Celtic Crusaders	Loss	25-12	Away	Brewery Field	3,009	11/07/2009
Super League XIV	21	Castleford Tigers	Loss	12-18	Home	The Willows	3,487	17/07/2009
Super League XIV	22	Warrington Wolves	Loss	62-20	Away	Halliwell Jones Stadium	8,906	26/07/2009
Super League XIV	23	Wakefield Trinity Wildcats	Loss	24-30	Home	The Willows	3,151	31/07/2009
Super League XIV	16	Catalans Dragons	Loss	16-18	Home	The Willows	3,475	07/08/2009
Super League XIV	24	Harlequins RL	Win	22-26	Away	The Twickenham Stoop	2,612	15/08/2009
Super League XIV	25	Hull Kingston Rovers	Loss	10-14	Home	The Willows	4,224	21/08/2009
Super League XIV	26	Bradford Bulls	Loss	44-18	Away	Grattan Stadium	8,167	06/09/2009
Super League XIV	27	Leeds Rhinos	Loss	24-30	Home	The Willows	6,101	11/09/2009

^{A} Note A: Match between Salford City Reds and Catalans Dragons was postponed to 7 August 2009 due to a test between England and France in Paris over the same weekend, in which ten Catalans players were involved.

== League table ==
Pos	Team	Pld	W	D	L	PF	PA	PD	Pts	Qualification
1	Leeds Rhinos (L, C)	27	21	0	6	805	453	+352	42	Play-offs
2	St Helens	27	19	0	8	733	466	+267	38	Play-offs
3	Huddersfield Giants	27	18	0	9	690	416	+274	36	Play-offs
4	Hull Kingston Rovers	27	17	1	9	650	516	+134	35	Play-offs
5	Wakefield Trinity Wildcats	27	16	0	11	685	609	+76	32	Play-offs
6	Wigan Warriors	27	15	0	12	659	551	+108	30	Play-offs
7	Castleford Tigers	27	14	0	13	645	702	−57	28	Play-offs
8	Catalans Dragons	27	13	0	14	613	660	−47	26	Play-offs
9	Bradford Bulls	27	12	1	14	653	668	−15	25	
10	Warrington Wolves	27	12	0	15	649	705	−56	24	
11	Harlequins	27	11	0	16	591	691	−100	22	
12	Hull F.C.	27	10	0	17	502	623	−121	20	
13	Salford City Reds	27	7	0	20	456	754	−298	14	
14	Celtic Crusaders	27	3	0	24	357	874	−517	6	

Source: Rugby League Project
Rules for classification: 1) Points; 2) Points difference; 3) Number of points scored;
(C) Champions; (L) League Leaders' Shield Winners
