= Jack Spencer =

Jack Spencer may refer to:

- Jack Spencer (1900s rugby league), English rugby league footballer
- Jack Spencer (rugby league, born 1920) (1920–1998), Australian rugby league footballer for the Balmain Tigers
- Jack Spencer (rugby league, born 1990), English rugby league player for the Wests Tigers
- Jack Spencer (footballer) (1920–1966), English Association football (soccer) player
- Jack Spencer (basketball) (1923–2004), American college basketball coach

== See also ==
- Jack Spencer-Churchill (1880–1947), English military officer and brother of Winston Churchill
- John Spencer (disambiguation)
