= John Spenser (disambiguation) =

John Spenser was an English academic.

John Spenser may also refer to:

- John Spenser (Jesuit)
- John Spenser (MP) for Newcastle-under-Lyme (UK Parliament constituency)

== See also ==
- John Spencer (disambiguation)
