= John Spencer-Churchill =

John Spencer-Churchill may refer to:

- John Spencer-Churchill, 7th Duke of Marlborough (1822–1883), British statesman and nobleman
- John Strange Spencer-Churchill (1880–1947), soldier and brother of the former British prime minister, Winston Churchill
- John Spencer-Churchill, 10th Duke of Marlborough (1897–1972), British peer
- John Spencer-Churchill (artist) (1909–1992), artist and son of John Strange Spencer-Churchill
- John Spencer-Churchill, 11th Duke of Marlborough (1926–2014), British peer
- John Kemys Spencer-Churchill (1835–1913), British colonial administrator

== See also ==
- John Spencer (disambiguation)
- John Churchill (disambiguation)
