= Ken Banks (rugby league) =

Australian rugby league footballer

Personal information
- Full name: McKenzie John Boyd Marjoribanks
- Born: 12 May 1917 Wickham, New South Wales, Australia
- Died: 26 November 1998 (aged 81) Newcastle, New South Wales, Australia

Playing information
- Position: Hooker
Club
Years	Team	Pld	T	G	FG	P
1946	St. George Dragons	15	0	0	0	0
- Source: Whiticker/Hudson

McKenzie John Boyd Banks (12 May 1917 – 26 November 1998), born Marjoribanks, was an Australian rugby league player footballer who played in the 1940s.

== Early life ==
Banks came from a sporting family from Georgetown, New South Wales. He played one season of first grade with St. George Dragons in 1946 in the NSWRFL. His position was hooker and he played in 15 games that year including the 1946 Grand Final. He later played in the Newcastle competition for many years at the Central Newcastle Club.
