= Alan Keato =

Australian rugby league footballer

Personal information
- Full name: Alan Louis Keato
- Born: 7 September 1920 Kogarah, New South Wales, Australia
- Died: 16 December 1943 (aged 23) Lae, Territory of New Guinea

Playing information
- Position: Second-row
Club
Years	Team	Pld	T	G	FG	P
1943	Western Suburbs	5	0	0	0	0
- Relatives: Bill Keato (brother)
- Military career
- Allegiance: Australia
- Branch: Australian Army
- Service years: 1943
- Rank: Lance-bombardier
- Unit: Second Australian Imperial Force
- Conflicts: World War II

Alan Louis Keato (7 September 1920 – 16 December 1943) was an Australian rugby league footballer who played in the New South Wales Rugby League for Western Suburbs. He died during the Second World War.

== Early life and rugby career ==
Keato was born on 7 September 1920 in Kogarah to William and Annie Keato. He played 5 matches for Western Suburbs in 1943, the same club for which his brother Bill had played.

== Military career ==
Keato enlisted in the Second Australian Imperial Force on 10 February 1943. Rising to become a lance-bombardier, he died of accidental injuries at Lae during the New Guinea campaign on 16 December 1943. He was buried at Lae War Cemetery.

== Career statistics ==
Appearances and goals by club, season and competition
Club	Season	Division	League				Other				Total			
Club	Season	Division	Apps	Tries	Goals	Points	Apps	Tries	Goals	Points	Apps	Tries	Goals	Points
Western Suburbs	1943	New South Wales Rugby League	5	0	0	0	0	0	0	0	5	0	0	0
Career total			5	0	0	0	0	0	0	0	5	0	0	0
