= Fred Brown (rugby league, Sydney) =

Australian rugby league footballer

Personal information
- Full name: Frederick Brown

Playing information
- Position: Centre
Club
Years	Team	Pld	T	G	FG	P
1945–47	St. George	26	9	9	0	45
1949	Balmain	8	0	3	0	6
	Total	34	9	12	0	51
Representative
Years	Team	Pld	T	G	FG	P
1944–47	NSW Country	2	0	0	0	0

Fred Brown is an Australian former rugby league footballer who played in the 1940s.

== Playing career ==
Ex Newcastle centre, Fred Brown played centre in first grade at St. George for three seasons between 1945 and 1947, including the 1946 Grand Final. He was a star in the Country Firsts rugby league team in 1944.

After sitting out the 1948 season, he returned for one season at Balmain in 1949 before retiring.
