= Jack Churchill (disambiguation) =

Jack Churchill (1906–1996) was a British soldier.

Jack Churchill may also refer to:

- Jack Churchill (1880–1947), brother of Winston Churchill
- Jack Churchill, a fictional character created by Mark Chadbourn

== See also ==
- John Churchill (disambiguation)
