= Hilton Kidd =

Australian rugby league footballer

Personal information
- Full name: Hilton Kidd
- Born: 1922; Balmain, New South Wales, Australia
- Died: 16 December 2011 (aged 88–89); Sydney, New South Wales, Australia

Playing information
- Position: Prop, Second-row
Club
Years	Team	Pld	T	G	FG	P
1945–48	Balmain	27	2	0	0	6
1951	Manly-Warringah	1	0	0	0	0
	Total	28	2	0	0	6
- Source: As of 5 April 2019

Hilton Kidd (1922–2011) was an Australian rugby league player who played in the 1940s and 1950s.

Kidd played four seasons at Balmain between 1945–1948 as a prop-forward. He also played one season with Manly-Warringah in 1951. Kidd won a premiership with Balmain in 1946.

Kidd died on 16 December 2011.
