= Jack McPherson =

Australian rugby league footballer

Personal information
- Full name: John McPherson
- Born: Sydney, New South Wales, Australia

Playing information
- Position: Prop
Club
Years	Team	Pld	T	G	FG	P
1945–48	St. George	33	1	0	0	3
1950–51	Eastern Suburbs	22	2	0	0	6
	Total	55	3	0	0	9

John 'Jack' McPherson is an Australian former rugby league footballer who played in the 1940s and 1950s.

== Playing career ==
McPherson was a prop-forward for St. George and played four seasons with the club between 1945 and 1948, including the 1946 Grand Final.

He did not play during the 1949 season, but returned in 1950 to play for Eastern Suburbs for two seasons between 1950 and 1951. A highlight of McPherson's career was possibly his selection as a reserve for Australia for the third test against England in 1946, but he did not take the field.
