= Maia Agerup =

Norwegian Olympic sailor (born 1995)

Personal information
- Full name: Maia Kristiane Agerup
- Nationality: Norwegian
- Born: 22 June 1995 (age 31) Oslo, Norway

Sailing career
- Sport: Sailing
- Club: Royal Norwegian Yacht Club
- Coached by: Krzysztof Kierkowski

Achievements and titles
- World finals: Best Female Team, 29er Worlds 2013
- National finals: 2 x Norwegian Champion

Maia Kristiane Agerup (born 22 June 1995) is a Norwegian Olympic sailor who represents the New York Yacht Club in New York, NY and Royal Norwegian Yacht Club in Oslo.

Together with her twin sister Ragna Agerup she sailed the Olympic class boat 49er FX competed in the 2016 Rio Olympics.

In June 2016 the team was ranked 15th on the ISAF World Ranking. Their best ranking position is 4th, from December 2012. After competing in the Olympics, Maia started her education at Boston University, where she graduated in 2020.

She has previously sailed the Optimist dinghy and 29er.

== Junior career ==
2010 - Silver. Norwegian Championship, Optimist

2010 - Gold. Norwegian Championship Teams Racing. (KNS - Ragna Agerup, Line Flem Høst, Sophie Tjøm)

2013 - Gold. Norwegian Championship, 29er

2013 - 12th place and winner of the Female Class. 29er World Championship. Aarhus, Denmark

2013 - 4th place. 29er EuroCup Overall (Best Female Team)

== Senior career ==
2014 - Gold. ISAF World Cup, 49er FX. Melbourne, Australia

2015 - 9th place. European Championship, 49er FX. Porto, Portugal

2015 - Bronze. U23 World Championship, 49er FX. Flensburg, Germany

2016 - 4th place. ISAF World Cup, 49er FX. Miami, USA

2016 - 5th place. ISAF World Cup, 49er FX. Weymouth, United Kingdom

2017 - Silver. ISAF World Cup, 49er FX. Miami, USA

2017 - Gold. Junior World Championship 49er FX. Kingston, Canada

2017 - 8th place. European Championship, 49er FX. Kiel, Germany

2018 - Silver. ISAF World Cup, 49er FX. Miami, USA
