= John Churchill (disambiguation) =

John Churchill, 1st Duke of Marlborough (1650–1722) was an English soldier and statesman.

John Churchill may also refer to:

- John C. Churchill (1821–1905), American lawyer and politician
- John Churchill, 7th Duke of Marlborough (1822–1883)
- John Churchill (lawyer), English lawyer of the seventeenth century
- John Churchill (priest) (1920–1979), Anglican Dean of Carlisle
- John Churchill (died 1682) (1622–1682), MP for Dorchester
- John Churchill (1657–1709), MP for Dorchester
- John Churchill (sport shooter) (1939–2015), British rifle shooter
- John Churchill (publisher) (1801–1875), English medical publisher
- John Churchill (judge) (c. 1620–1685), English lawyer and attorney-general
- John Churchill, Marquess of Blandford (1686–1703), British nobleman
- John Gibbs Churchill (1905–1975), New Zealand trade unionist and local politician

== See also ==
- Jack Churchill (disambiguation)
- John Spencer-Churchill (disambiguation)
