= Max Hayward (rugby league) =

Australian rugby league footballer

Personal information
- Full name: Maxwell John Hayward
- Born: 9 June 1915 Beaudesert, Queensland, Australia
- Died: 21 February 2011 (aged 95) Coorparoo, Queensland, Queensland, Australia

Playing information
- Position: Halfback
Club
Years	Team	Pld	T	G	FG	P
1944–47	St George Dragons	37	7	0	0	21
- Source: Whiticker/Hudson

Maxwell John Hayward (9 June 1915 – 21 February 2011) was an Australian rugby league footballer who played in the 1940s.

Originally from Beaudesert, Queensland, Max 'the mighty atom' Hayward was a half-back for the St George Dragons for three seasons: 1944, 1946 and 1947. Hayward enlisted in the Australian Army and served in the Middle East and New Guinea, thus his career was curtailed by World War II, but he re-signed with the club in 1946 and played in the 1946 Grand Final.

After the 1947 season he played football on the N.S.W. North Coast before retiring.
