= Pat Morgan =

Australian rugby league footballer (1917–1975)

Personal information
- Full name: Patrick Thomas Morgan
- Born: 30 November 1917 North Sydney, NSW, Australia
- Died: 14 July 1975 (aged 57)

Playing information
- Position: Utility back
Club
Years	Team	Pld	T	G	FG	P
1939–47	North Sydney	30	1	47	0	97

Patrick Thomas Morgan (30 November 1917 – 14 July 1975) was an Australian rugby league footballer.

A North Sydney local, Morgan was a utility back who could play as a fullback, centre or in the halves. He started with North Sydney's lower grade sides in 1938 and got his maiden opportunity in first grade the following season. While making intermittent appearances with the firsts, Morgan had some success in the reserves, contributing to their 1940 and 1942 premiership teams. His career was interrupted by World War II, during which he served in New Guinea. He returned to first grade in 1946 and made regular appearances that season as a goal–kicking fullback.
