= Des Bryan =

Australian rugby league footballer

Personal information
- Full name: Des Bryan

Playing information
- Position: Halfback
Club
Years	Team	Pld	T	G	FG	P
1947–48	Balmain	20	5	0	0	15
1949–51	South Sydney	25	7	0	0	21
	Total	45	12	0	0	36
- Source: As of 26 February 2019

Des Bryan was an Australian professional rugby league footballer who played in the 1940s and 1950s. He played for Balmain and South Sydney as a halfback.

== Playing career ==
Bryan made his first grade debut in 1947, the same year he was a member of the Balmain side which defeated Canterbury-Bankstown 13–9 in the grand final. In 1948, Bryan played at half back in Balmain's 8–5 loss to Western Suburbs in the 1948 NSWRL grand final.

In 1949, Bryan made the move to South Sydney where he played in his third consecutive grand final, the 1949 decider against St. George which Souths lost 19–12.

Bryan played two more seasons before retiring at the end of 1951.
