= Jack Spencer (rugby league, born 1920) =

Australian rugby league footballer

Personal information
- Born: 20 December 1920; Sydney, New South Wales, Australia
- Died: 10 February 1998 (aged 77); Bateau Bay, New South Wales, Australia

Playing information
Club
Years	Team	Pld	T	G	FG	P
1942–51	Balmain	149	26	2	0	82
Representative
Years	Team	Pld	T	G	FG	P
1945	New South Wales	2	1	0	0	3
1945–46	NSW City	2	2	0	0	6
- Relatives: John Spencer (son)

Jack Spencer (1920–1998) was an Australian rugby league footballer who played in the 1940s and 1950s, a state representative prop forward who won two premierships with the Balmain club in Sydney.

== Playing career ==
Spencer had a long top-grade career playing eleven seasons at the Balmain club between 1942 and 1951. He also represented New South Wales on two occasions in 1945.

Spencer was a rugged forward who played in two winning premiership teams in 1946 and 1947. He also played in losing grand finals in 1945 and 1948.

He was the father of another premiership winning Balmain player, named John Spencer, who played between 1966 and 1975.

== Death ==
Spencer died at Bateau Bay, New South Wales on 10 February 1998 aged 77.
