= Eddie Tracey =

Australian rugby league footballer (born 1923)

Personal information
- Full name: Eddie Tracey
- Born: 16 July 1923

Playing information
- Position: Centre
Club
Years	Team	Pld	T	G	FG	P
1946–48	Canterbury Bankstown	38	24	0	0	72
1949	South Sydney	6	2	0	0	6
1949	Canterbury Bankstown	1	0	0	0	0
	Total	45	26	0	0	78
Representative
Years	Team	Pld	T	G	FG	P
1948	New South Wales	1	0	0	0	0

Eddie Tracey (born 16 July 1923) was an Australian professional rugby league footballer who played in the 1940s. He played for Canterbury Bankstown in the NSWRFL premiership competition, as a centre.

== Playing career ==
Tracey played his junior rugby league for St Joseph's College and played reserve grade for Canterbury in 1942 and 1943 and later enlisted in the Royal Australian Air Force during World War II. In 1946, Tracey made his first grade debut for Canterbury against Sydney Roosters. In the same season, Canterbury fell short of a grand final appearance as they were defeated by Wests Tigers in the preliminary final.

The following year, Tracey played at centre in Canterbury's 13-9 grand final defeat by Wests Tigers at the Sydney Sports Ground. In 1948, Tracey was selected to play for New South Wales and featured in one game. Tracey was also selected to play for Australia on tour but made no appearances due to injury. In 1949, due to the residency rules at the time, Tracey was not allowed to play for Canterbury and switched to play for South Sydney Rabbitohs. Tracey only spent half the year with Souths before switching back to Canterbury mid season and retired at the end of 1949.
