= Lewis Palfrey =

English rugby league player

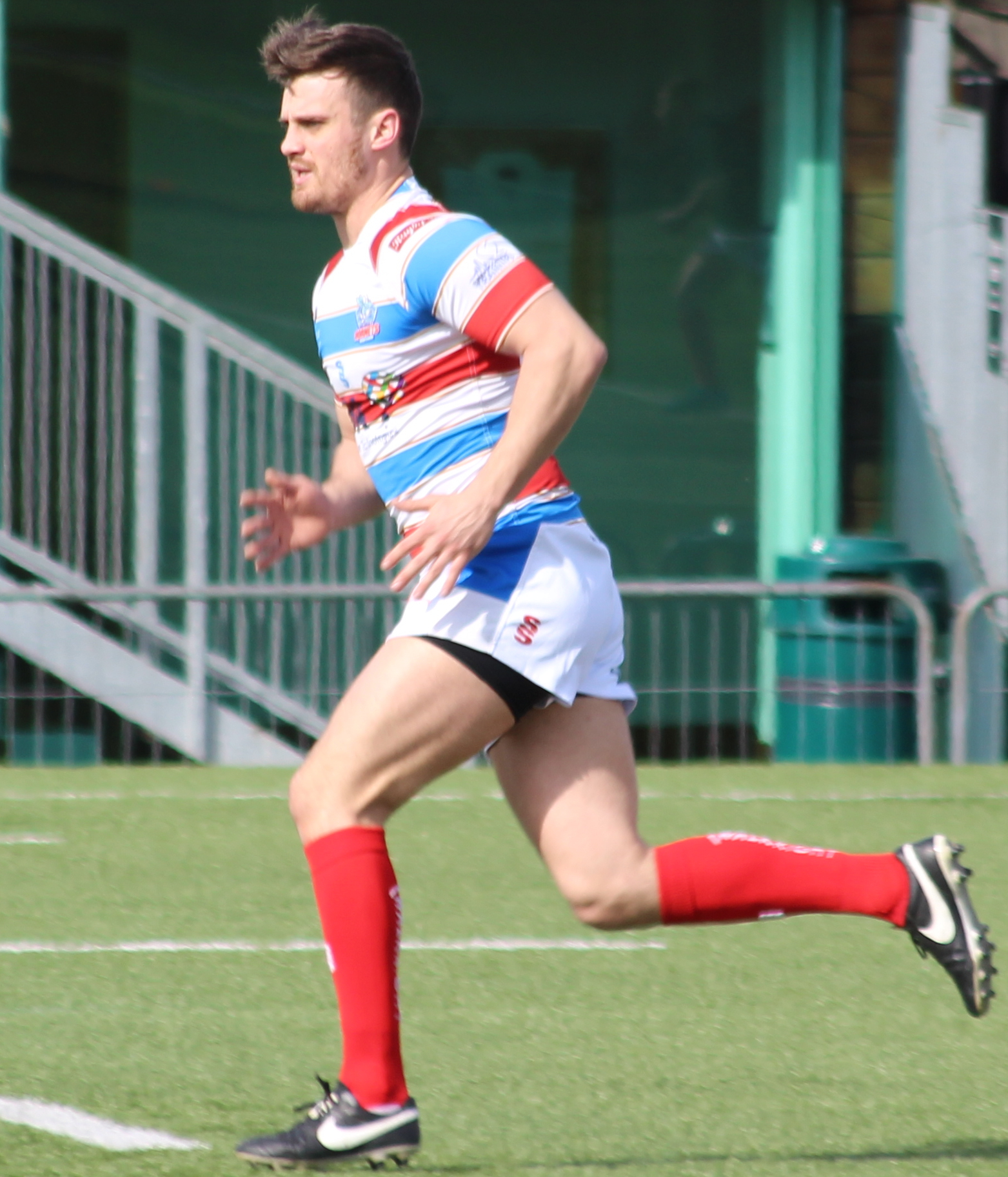

Personal information
- Born: 25 February 1990 (age 35)

Playing information
- Position: Stand-off, Fullback
Club
Years	Team	Pld	T	G	FG	P
2011	Whitehaven	21	5	64	0	148
2013	Batley Bulldogs	12	1	8	0	20
2012(loan)	→ Whitehaven	7	2	0	0	8
2013–16	Oldham	91	23	331	2	756
2017–	Rochdale Hornets	29	1	45	0	94
	Total	160	32	448	2	1026
- Source: As of 15 April 2018

Lewis Palfrey (born 25 February 1990) is a professional rugby league footballer who plays as a stand-off or fullback for the Rochdale Hornets in the Championship.

Palfrey began his career at the Salford City Reds. He has also played for Whitehaven, Batley Bulldogs and Oldham.
