= Norm Young (rugby league) =

Australian rugby league footballer

Personal information
- Full name: Norman Young

Playing information
- Position: Centre
Club
Years	Team	Pld	T	G	FG	P
1944–48	Canterbury-Bankstown	39	16	0	0	48
- Source: As of 15 April 2019

Norm Young was an Australian professional rugby league footballer who played in the 1940s. He played for Canterbury-Bankstown in the New South Wales Rugby League (NSWRL) competition.

== Playing career ==
Young made his first grade debut for Canterbury against Balmain in Round 4 1944 at the Leichhardt Oval. In the 1944 season, Young made 4 appearances as Canterbury went from winning the premiership in 1942 to running last in 1943 and 1944 claiming the wooden spoon. As of the 2019 season, no other club has gone from premiers to wooden spooners the next season with the exception of Melbourne who won the premiership in 2009 but were later stripped of the title for major breaches of the salary cap in 2010 and made to play for no points which resulted in the club coming last.

In 1947, Canterbury went on to finish as minor premiers that season. Young scored a try in Canterbury's 25-15 semi final victory over Newtown before setting up a grand final clash against Balmain. Balmain would go on to win the grand final 25–19 at the Sydney Sports Ground.

Due to the rules at the time, Canterbury were allowed to challenge for a rematch as they had finished as minor premiers. In the grand final challenge, Young played at centre as Balmain once again defeated Canterbury 13–9 with all of Balmain's points coming from Joe Jorgenson. Young departed Canterbury at the end of the 1948 season and moved to Armidale to play in the country rugby league competition.
