= Daley Williams =

Jamaica international rugby league footballer

Personal information
- Born: 15 May 1986 (age 40) Halifax, West Yorkshire, England

Playing information
- Position: wing, centre
Club
Years	Team	Pld	T	G	FG	P
2006–07	Salford Red Devils	11	4	0	0	16
2009	Keighley Cougars	1	0	0	0	0
2012	Batley Bulldogs	1	0	0	0	0
2013–14	Keighley Cougars	3	2	0	0	8
2019	Rochdale Hornets
2019	Swinton Lions	1	0	0	0	0
2020	London Skolars	0	0	0	0	0
	Total	17	6	0	0	24
- Source: As of 20 April 2021

Daley Williams (born 15 May 1986) is a professional rugby league footballer who plays as a wing or centre for the London Skolars in the RFL League 1. He previously played for Salford in the Super League, Hunslet, Keighley Cougars, Batley Bulldogs, Dewsbury Rams & Rochdale Hornets.

Williams is known for facing a four-year ban for illegal doping of steroids. He claimed he did not have any intentions of taking the illegal substance, despite the fact he was worried about his weight loss and loss of strength at the time after breaking his jaw.

== Background ==
Williams was born in Halifax, West Yorkshire, England.

== Playing career ==
Before joining Batley Bulldogs, Williams played for Keighley Cougars and Dewsbury Rams.

In October 2018 he signed a one-year deal to play for Swinton Lions.
