= Morrie Murphy =

Australian rugby league footballer

Personal information
- Full name: Morrie Murphy
- Born: Sydney, New South Wales, Australia
- Died: 4 April 2008 Sydney, New South Wales, Australia

Playing information
- Position: Wing
Club
Years	Team	Pld	T	G	FG	P
1947	Canterbury-Bankstown	19	14	0	0	42
- Source: As of 15 April 2019

Morrie Murphy was an Australian professional rugby league footballer who played in the 1940s. He played for Canterbury-Bankstown in the New South Wales Rugby League (NSWRL) competition.

== Playing career ==
Murphy made his first grade debut for Canterbury against Balmain at the Sydney Cricket Ground. Canterbury went on to finish as minor premiers that season and Murphy finished as the club's top try scorer. Murphy scored a try in Canterbury's semi final victory over Newtown before setting up a grand final clash against Balmain. Balmain would go on to win the grand final 25–19 at the Sydney Sports Ground.

Due to the rules at the time, Canterbury were allowed to challenge for a rematch as they had finished as minor premiers. In the grand final challenge, Murphy played on the wing as Balmain once again defeated Canterbury 13–9 with all of Balmain's points coming from Joe Jorgenson.

Morrie scored a record 14 tries for the season which was not equalled until 1953 by Barry Stenhouse and then beaten by Chris Anderson in 1974.

Murphy departed the club following the grand final loss. Murphy went on to play in the country rugby league competitions in New South Wales. He died on 4 April 2008.
