= John Spencer (American football) =

American football coach (1937–2021)

Biographical details
- Born: March 4, 1937; Denver, Colorado, U.S.
- Died: July 10, 2021 (aged 84)
- Education: Shepherd College; Appalachian State Teachers College

Playing career

Football
- 1957–1960: Shepherd
- Position: Tackle

Coaching career (HC unless noted)

Football
- 1961–1965: Gardner–Webb (assistant)
- 1966: Shepherd (line)
- 1967: Bridgewater (assistant)
- 1968–1984: Bridgewater
- 1985–2002: Bridgewater (LB)

Track and field
- 1961–1965: Gardner–Webb

Head coaching record
- Overall: 56–93–3 (football)

Accomplishments and honors

Championships
- Football; 1 ODAC (1980)

John Stewart Spencer (March 4, 1937 – July 10, 2021) was an American college football coach. He was the head football coach for Bridgewater College in Bridgewater, Virginia from 1968 to 1984, compiling a record of 56–93–3.

== Playing career ==
Spencer was born in Denver and played high school football at Northwestern Senior High School in Baltimore. He played college football for Shepherd as a tackle.

== Coaching career ==
Spencer started his career as an assistant coach for Gardner–Webb in 1961. In 1966, he joined his alma mater, Shepherd, as the line coach. In 1967, he became an assistant coach for Bridgewater. The following year, in 1968, Spencer was named head football coach. In seventeen seasons as head coach, he finished with an overall record of 56–93–3. His best season came in 1980 when he led his team to a 6–3 record and an Old Dominion Athletic Conference (ODAC) title. He resigned following the 1984 season. From 1985 until his retirement in 2002, he served as the linebackers coach through four coaching tenures: Joe Bush, Dan Antolik, Max Lowe, and Mike Clark.

Spencer also served as the head track and field coach during his tenure with Gardner–Webb.

== Death ==
Spencer died on July 10, 2021.

== Head coaching record ==
=== Football ===
Year	Team	Overall	Conference	Standing	Bowl/playoffs
Bridgewater Eagles (Mason–Dixon Conference) (1968–1973)
1968	Bridgewater	5–3	3–1	2nd	
1969	Bridgewater	3–6	2–3	4th	
1970	Bridgewater	4–5	2–2	4th	
1971	Bridgewater	6–3	3–1	3rd	
1972	Bridgewater	4–4–1	0–2–1	6th	
1973	Bridgewater	5–4	2–1	T–3rd	
Bridgewater Eagles (Mason–Dixon Conference / Virginia College Athletic Association) (1974)
1974	Bridgewater	4–5	1–2 / 1–3	T–5th / 7th	
Bridgewater Eagles (Virginia College Athletic Association) (1975)
1975	Bridgewater	2–7	0–4	10th	
Bridgewater Eagles (Old Dominion Athletic Conference) (1976–1984)
1976	Bridgewater	1–8	0–4	5th	
1977	Bridgewater	3–5–1	0–3–1	5th	
1978	Bridgewater	3–6	1–3	T–4th	
1979	Bridgewater	4–5	1–3	T–4th	
1980	Bridgewater	6–3	4–1	1st	
1981	Bridgewater	2–6–1	0–4–1	T–5th	
1982	Bridgewater	3–6	2–3	T–4th	
1983	Bridgewater	0–9	0–6	7th	
1984	Bridgewater	1–8	1–4	T–5th	
Bridgewater:		56–93–3			
Total:		56–93–3			
National championship Conference title Conference division title or championship game berth
