= Roy Hasson =

Australian rugby league footballer

Personal information
- Full name: Roy Hilton Hasson
- Born: 17 April 1921 Corrimal, New South Wales, Australia
- Died: 23 December 1968 (aged 47) Bondi Beach, New South Wales, Australia

Playing information
- Position: Five-eighth, Halfback
Club
Years	Team	Pld	T	G	FG	P
1940–44	St. George	23	4	5	0	22
1946–50	Canterbury-Bankstown	53	21	78	0	219
	Total	76	25	83	0	241
Representative
Years	Team	Pld	T	G	FG	P
1947	New South Wales	1	0	1	0	2

Roy Hilton Hasson (1921–1968) was an Australian rugby league player who played in the 1940s and 1950s. He was a New South Wales state representative half who won the 1941 premiership with St George and later finished his career with Canterbury-Bankstown.

== Playing career ==
Roy 'Torchy' Hasson played with St George for five seasons between 1940 & 1944 and then Canterbury-Bankstown between 1946 & 1950. He won a premiership with St George in 1941, before moving to Canterbury after the war. He played in Canterbury-Bankstown's losing 1947 Grand Final and captained the 'Berries' during 1948. Hasson represented New South Wales on one occasion in 1947.

== Death ==
He died at his Bondi Beach home on 23 December 1968 aged 47.

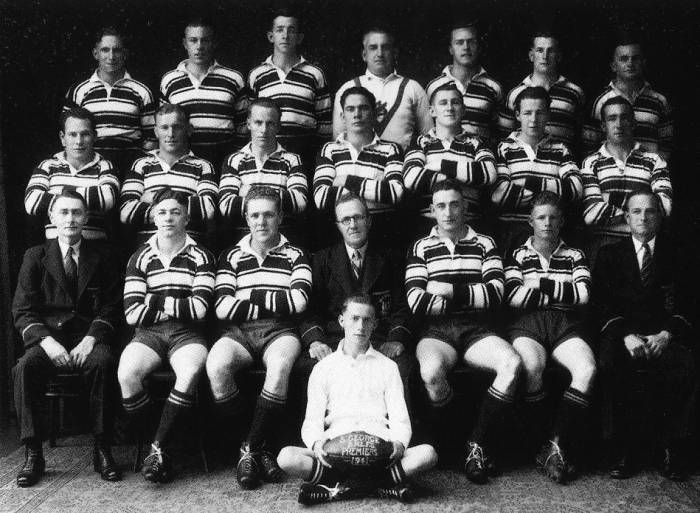
Hasson (seated 2nd from left) in St. George's 1941 premiership-winning team

== Published sources ==
- Whiticker, Alan & Hudson, Glen (2006) The Encyclopedia of Rugby League Players, Gavin Allen Publishing, Sydney
- Haddan, Steve (2007) The Finals - 100 Years of National Rugby League Finals, Steve Haddan Publishing, Brisbane
