= The Dynamic Rockers =

- Origin: Tilburg, Netherlands
- Genres: Rock and roll
- Years active: 1958 - 1986
- Labels: Helia (Be); Dureco (Be); Pico; Rarity Records
- Past members: Ad Doomen; Henk van Broekhoven; Sjef Haans; Peter Smulders; Peter van den Heuvel

The Dynamic Rockers is a Dutch rock and roll band from Tilburg formed in 1954 by Henk van Broekhoven a.k.a. Hank Brooklyn later known as John Spencer, Sjef Haans, Peter Smulders and Peter van den Heuvel. The quartet is mainly known in the Netherlands for their Dutch covers of American Rock and roll hits. The band released four singles on the Belgian label Helia in the early sixties and performed in the popular television show Tienerklanken.

In 1986, the Dynamic Rockers recorded and produced for Dutch singers such as Miss Dynamite and Country Annie for singles released on the label Pico.

In 1991, the Dutch record label Rarity Records released the compilation In His Early Days by The Dynamic Rockers Featuring John Spencer that includes 16 songs. The second and third volume of In His Early Days are then released in 1992.

== Discography ==
=== Singles ===
- 1980: Heimwee Naar Blue Bayou / Anna [Dureco Benelux]
- 1981: Jenny Kom Bij Me (Ginny Come Lately) / Dan Nog Eenmaal Met Mij (Save The Last Dance For Me) [CNR]
- 1983: 'k Stuurde Je Rode Rozen (18 Yellow Roses) / 'k Ben 'n Nul (I'm A Nut) [Flits]
- 1983: Blijf Bij Mij Vannacht (I Need Your Love Tonight) / 't Heeft Geen Zin (The Shape I'm In) [Flits]
- 1984: Pretty Belinda (Nederlandse Versie) / Razmataz Polka [Pico]
- 1984: Honey Bee (Dutch Version) / Hey Lilly (Dutch Version) [Pico]
- 1985: Ik Ben Zo Ver Van Huis (I'm Coming Home) / Jij Was Van Mij (Just One Time) [Pico]
- 1986: Let's Go / Italian Lovesong [Pico]
- 1986: Woe Hoe / De Ontbijtpolka [Pico]

=== Greatest hits / compilations ===
- 1980: The Dynamic Rockers [Dureco Benelux]
- 1991: Volume 1, Featuring John Spencer In His Early Days [Rarity Records]
- 1992: Volume 2, Featuring John Spencer In His Early Days [Rarity Records]
- 1992: Volume 3, Featuring John Spencer In His Early Days [Rarity Records]
- Unknown: The Dynamic Rockers Nederlandstalig Vol. 1 [Disco Sound]
