= John Spencer (rugby league, born 1946) =

Australian rugby league footballer (1946–2021)

Personal information
- Born: 10 August 1946 Sydney, New South Wales, Australia
- Died: 18 February 2021 (aged 74) Wyong, New South Wales, Australia

Playing information
- Position: Second-row
Club
Years	Team	Pld	T	G	FG	P
1966–75	Balmain	150	58	1	5	185
Representative
Years	Team	Pld	T	G	FG	P
1969	New South Wales	1	0	0	0	0
- Father: Jack Spencer

John Spencer (10 August 1946 – 18 February 2021) was an Australian professional rugby league footballer who played in the 1960s and 1970s. He played for Balmain as a second rower and is the son of former Balmain player and premiership winner Jack Spencer.

== Playing career ==
Spencer made his debut for Balmain in 1966 but was not a member of the side which reached the grand final that year. In 1969, Spencer was a part of the Balmain side which defeated Souths 11–2 at the Sydney Cricket Ground. The match is still considered to this day to be one of the greatest grand final upsets in history. This would prove to be the last premiership Balmain would win as a stand-alone entity before merging with the Western Suburbs Magpies to form the Wests Tigers at the end of 1999.

After some of the Balmain stars had retired or moved on, Spencer stayed with the club and captained the side during the early 1970s. He retired at the end of the 1975 season. At representative level he played for New South Wales on one occasion.

John Spencer died on 18 February 2021, aged 74. He had two children Kristi and Jarryd.
