= John Spencer (footballer, born 1934) =

English footballer

Personal information
- Full name: John Raymond Spencer
- Date of birth: 20 November 1934
- Place of birth: Sheffield, England
- Date of death: 22 August 2007 (aged 72)
- Place of death: Sheffield, England
- Height: 6 ft 0 in (1.83 m)
- Position: Forward

Senior career*
Years	Team	Apps	(Gls)
1954–1957	Sheffield United	24	(10)
- * Club domestic league appearances and goals

John Raymond Spencer (20 November 1934 – 22 August 2007) was an English footballer who played as a forward, appearing as an inside left, inside right or outside left.

Born in Sheffield, Spencer spent his entire playing career with home-town club Sheffield United. Signing for the club as an amateur in 1954, Spencer was a regular in the reserves before turning professional but remaining as a part-time player while he trained to become an accountant. After making his Football League debut in December 1954, Spencer appeared sporadically for United, and it was not until his final season that he became a regular in the first team. However, by this point Spencer had begun to struggle with injuries and was forced to retire from playing in the summer of 1957.
