= Jack McCullough (rugby league) =

Australian rugby league footballer

Personal information
- Full name: Jack McCullough
- Born: 1921 Leichhardt, New South Wales, Australia
- Died: 2005 (aged 83–84) Sydney, New South Wales, Australia

Playing information
- Position: Fullback
Club
| Years | Team | Pld | T | G | FG | P |
|---|---|---|---|---|---|---|
| 1946–50 | Balmain | 34 | 0 | 4 | 0 | 8 |
- Source: As of 25 April 2019

Jack McCullough (1921-2005) was an Australian professional rugby league footballer who played in the 1940s and 1950s. He played for Balmain in the New South Wales Rugby League (NSWRL) competition during the club's second golden era where they won 3 premierships and appeared in 5 straight grand finals.

== Playing career ==
McCullough made his first grade debut for Balmain in 1946. Balmain went on to finish third on the table and reached the grand final against minor premiers St George. McCullough played at fullback for Balmain in the grand final as the club won their 9th premiership defeating St George 13-12 at the Sydney Cricket Ground.

In 1947, Balmain reached their second consecutive grand final against minor premiers Canterbury-Bankstown. Balmain won the 1947 NSWRL grand final 25-19 but Canterbury were allowed to challenge for a rematch as they had finished as minor premiers and used their right to challenge. In the grand final challenge, McCullough played at fullback as Balmain won their 10th premiership defeating Canterbury 13-9 with all of Balmain's points coming from Joe Jorgenson.

In 1948, Balmain played in their third grand final in as many years. McCullough missed playing in the match and was replaced by Dave Parkinson. Balmain lost the final to Western Suburbs 8-5. In 1949, Balmain again reached the finals but were defeated in the preliminary final by St George ending their quest at playing in a fourth straight grand final. McCullough played in the defeat at fullback. McCullough retired the following season in 1950.
