= George Williams (rugby league, born 1923) =

Australian rugby league footballer (1923–1995)

Personal information
- Full name: George Harry Williams
- Born: 27 June 1923 Drummoyne, NSW, Australia
- Died: 3 July 1995 (aged 72)

Playing information
- Position: Five-eighth, Centre
Club
Years	Team	Pld	T	G	FG	P
1946–51	Balmain Tigers	48	20	1	0	62

George Harry Williams (27 June 1923 – 3 July 1995) was an Australian rugby league footballer.

A local junior, Williams played first–grade for Balmain between 1946 and 1951. He was a member of Balmain's 1946 and 1947 premiership teams. Primarily a five–eighth, Williams came close to occupying that position in the national side in 1948, but suffered a poisoned shin when on the brink of selection. He left in 1949 to play for Mudgee, but returned the following season, captain–coaching the Balmain reserves.
