= Bill Keato =

Australian rugby league footballer and administrator

Personal information
- Full name: William Townshend Keato
- Born: 3 November 1918 Alexandria, New South Wales
- Died: 8 October 2012 (aged 93) Bayview, New South Wales

Playing information
- Position: Fullback
Club
Years	Team	Pld	T	G	FG	P
1938–50	Western Suburbs	119	6	379	0	776
- Source: As of 7 January 2012
- Relatives: Alan Keato (brother)

William Keato (3 November 1918 – 8 October 2012) was an Australian rugby league footballer who played in the New South Wales Rugby Football League premiership for Sydney' Western Suburbs from 1938 till 1950. A goal-kicking fullback he played over one hundred first grade games for the Magpies. He scored over 770 points to become Wests' all-time top point-scorer and goal-kicker. Roy Masters said of Keato, "A prodigious goalkicker, Keato booted what were called "flag waggers" from the sideline and halfway, often in the mud and against the wind, in the 1938-to-1950 era, when goals, rather than tries, decided games." He also said Keato, "won more matches for the Magpies than any other player."

== Playing career ==
Keato made his debut in the 1938 NSWRFL season without ever having played any junior rugby league. Soon after, he gained attention for a tackle he made on Easts' international centre Dave Brown that left Brown sidelined with a broken collarbone. He said that his "first playing bonus for the season was £13", £3 of which was spent on boots. He was known to take great care with his boots, referring to the right as his "tradesman," and the left as the "labourer's boot." He would sometimes change boots at half time and for certain games, such as the 1950 semi-final, he would bring 3 right boots to the match. He played just four games from 1943 to 1945. His younger brother Alan also played for Wests and later died in World War II.

Keato returned to Sydney in early 1946 after being released from the services. The next year he was forced to appeal against a decision that he should be playing for Parramatta as he lived in that area. He successfully argued that he would have played 100 games (players who had reached 100 games were allowed to play for any team, regardless of where they lived) if it were not for his service record. He played in the 1948 premiership-winning side, kicking a goal. The victory denied Balmain a third straight premiership. He twice scored the most points in the League for a season, in 1949 (163 points) and 1950 (180 points, at the time a club record). In one game at the SCG he kicked 10 goals. He was the Magpies highest scorer in seven seasons. In his last game, the 1950 Grand Final, although heavily concussed, Keato kicked six goals. The Magpies still lost to Souths in a close match, watched by over 32,000 people at the Sydney Sports Ground. His career totals might have been much higher had it not been for the period serving in the Australian Army. Keato claimed the role of fullback changed during his career, saying, "I was a fullback and all I had to do was catch and kick. But Clive decided it would be fun if fullbacks start running with the ball as well."

== Post-playing ==
Following his retirement from playing Keato served as Western Suburbs' secretary and treasurer, commencing as treasurer in 1951. His involvement with Wests lasted over four decades.

Keato was a nominee for the Wests Tigers team of the century, and was made a life member of the Western Suburbs club. He was inducted into the Western Suburbs Magpies Hall of Fame in 2010. Keato became the oldest living Magpies player, before he died in October 2012.

== Sources ==
- Bill Keato at yesterdayshero.com.au
- Bill Keato at nrlstats.com
