= Jack Spencer (rugby league, born 1990) =

English rugby league footballer

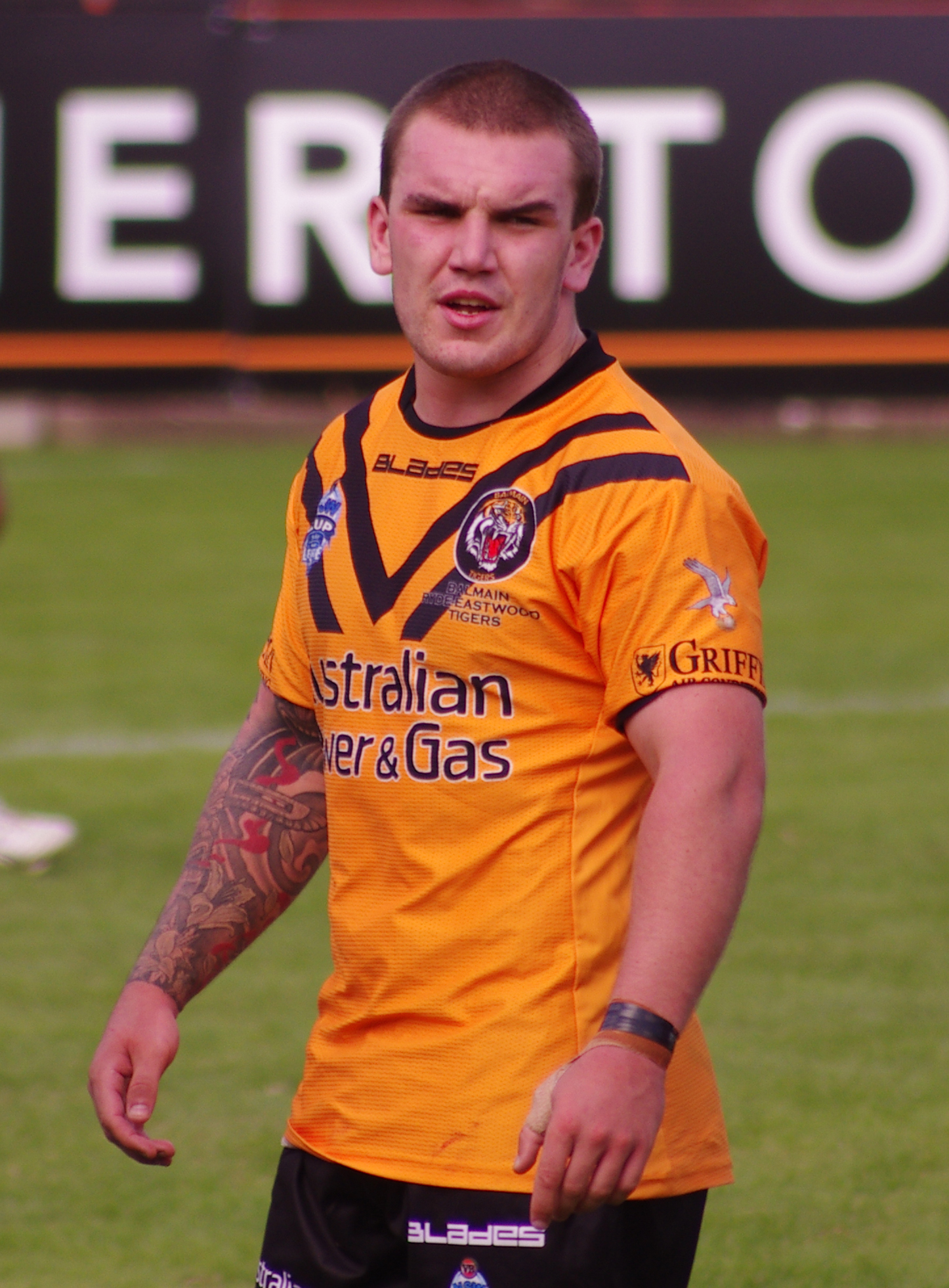

Personal information
- Born: 21 December 1990 (age 35) Swinton, Greater Manchester, England

Playing information
- Height: 6 ft 1 in (1.85 m)
- Weight: 15 st 13 lb (101 kg)
- Position: Prop, Second-row
Club
| Years | Team | Pld | T | G | FG | P |
|---|---|---|---|---|---|---|
| 2010–11 | Salford City Reds | 7 | 0 | 0 | 0 | 0 |
| 2012 | Wests Tigers | 0 | 0 | 0 | 0 | 0 |
| 2013 | Barrow Raiders | 16 | 1 | 0 | 0 | 4 |
| 2014–15 | Halifax | 32 | 1 | 0 | 0 | 4 |
| 2016–21 | Oldham | 106 | 4 | 0 | 0 | 16 |
| 2022 | Swinton Lions | 19 | 1 | 0 | 0 | 4 |
| | Total | 180 | 7 | 0 | 0 | 28 |

Jack Spencer (born 21 December 1990) is a former rugby league footballer who last played for Swinton Lions in the RFL League 1.

== Playing career ==
=== Oldham RLFC ===
He was previously at Oldham in League 1. His choice of position is either prop or second-row.

He previously played for Folly Lane ARLFC (in Pendlebury) and Salford City Reds in the Super League.

=== Swinton Lions ===
In October 2021, Spencer signed for hometown clun Swinton in the RFL League 1. He retired at the end of the 2022 season.
