= List of family relations in rugby league =

There have been several families from around the world of which two or more members have been involved in rugby league football at the highest levels since the sport's inception in 1895. Below is an incomplete list of families that have been involved in rugby league.

== A ==
=== Abbott family ===
- Edwin Abbott, New Zealand international, uncle of Bill Deacon
- Bill Deacon, New Zealand international, nephew of Edwin Abbot

=== Ackland family ===
- Ron Ackland, New Zealand international and Auckland representative player and coach; uncle of John
- John Ackland, New Zealand international and Auckland representative player; Nephew of Ron

=== Adamson family of England ===
- Luke Adamson, (born 1987), Salford City Reds, Super League, Halifax, Championship, London Broncos, England U18's (brother of Tobias Adamson)
- Toby Adamson, (born 1990), North Wales Crusaders, Championship, Dewsbury Rams, Championship (brother of Luke Adamson) Joshua Adamson, Leigh East, & Liverpool University

=== Adamson family of Australia ===
- Matt Adamson (born 1972), Australian SL international; NSW and NSW SL representative; Parramatta Eels/Penrith Panthers/Leeds Rhinos/Canberra Raiders player; rugby league assistant coach; younger brother of Phil.
- Phil Adamson (born 1970), NSW SL representative; Parramatta Eels/Penrith Panthers/Manly Sea Eagles/St Helens player; elder brother of Matt.

=== Agar family ===
- Allan Agar, Featherstone and Dewsbury RFL player and coach; father of Richard
- Richard Agar, Featherstone and Dewsbury RFL player and Super League coach; son of Allan

=== Ah Mau brothers ===
- Isaak Ah Mau (born 1982), New Zealand Warriors and North Queensland Cowboys NRL player
- Leeson Ah Mau (born 1989), New Zealand Warriors, North Queensland Cowboys and St George Illawarra Dragons NRL player

=== Albert brothers ===
- Stanton Albert (born 1995), PNG international, PNG Hunters, Widnes Vikings, N Wales Crusaders; brother of Wellington
- Wellington Albert (born 1994), PNG international, PNG Hunters, Widnes Vikings, N Wales Crusaders, Leeds Rhinos, Featherstone Rovers & Keighley Cougars; brother of Stanton

=== Alésina family ===
- Adolphe Alésina (1943-2024), France international & AS Carcassonne player, father of Adolphe
- Adolphe Alésina (born 1969), France international, Pamiers XIII, AS Carcassonne, XIII Catalan & Limoux Grizzlies player, son of Adolphe

=== Alexander brothers & extended family ===
- Greg Alexander (born 1965), Australian international, New South Wales representative, Penrith Panthers and Auckland Warriors player
- Ben Alexander (1970–1992), Penrith Panthers NSWRL player
- Mark Geyer (born 1967), Australian international, New South Wales representative, brother-in-law of Greg and Ben
- Cameron King (born 1991), brother-in-law of Greg
- Peter Shiels (born 1973), brother-in-law of Greg and Ben
- Matt Geyer (born 1975), New South Wales representative, Melbourne Storm, brother of Mark
- Mavrik Geyer (born 2001), Penrith Panthers, son of Mark and nephew of Matt

=== Anderson brothers ===
- Vinnie Anderson (born 1979), New Zealand international, NRL and Super League player
- Fraser Anderson (born 1984), Tonga international and NRL player
- Louis Anderson (born 1985), New Zealand international, NRL and Super League player

=== Anderson family ===
- Ben Anderson, Melbourne Storm player; Canterbury-Bankstown Bulldogs NYC coach; son of Chris Anderson, brother of Jarrad and nephew of Steve Folkes
- Chris Anderson, Australian international; NSW representative; Canterbury-Bankstown Bulldogs/Widnes/Hull Kingston Rovers/Halifax player; two-time premiership-winning coach; father of Ben and Jarrad, and brother-in-law to Steve Folkes
- Jarrad Anderson, Cronulla-Sutherland Sharks player; son of Chris Anderson, brother of Ben and nephew of Steve Folkes

=== Apps family ===
- Deon Apps, (born 1987), South Sydney Rabbitohs player, brother of Kezie
- Kezie Apps, (born 1991), Australia, St George Illawarra Dragons & Wests Tigers player, sister of Deon

=== Arkwright brothers ===
- John Arkwright, Great Britain international and St. Helens player; father of John and grandfather of Chris
- Chris Arkwright, Great Britain international and St Helens player; grandson of John and son of John, Jr.

=== Armitt family ===
- Charlie Armitt, (1926-2004), England international, Swinton, Huddersfield & Blackpool player, son of Tommy
- Tommy Armitt, (1904-1972), GB & England international, Swinton & Hull FC player, father of Charlie

=== Arthur family ===
- Brad Arthur, (born 1974), Parramatta Eels & Leeds Rhinos coach, father of Jake & Matt
- Jake Arthur, (born 2002), Parramatta Eels & Manly Sea Eagles player, son of Brad & brother of Matt
- Matt Arthur, (born 2005), Parramatta Eels & Newcastle Knights player, son of Brad & brother of Jake

=== Asher brothers ===
- Albert Asher, New Zealand international
- Ernie Asher, New Zealand international

=== Askin brothers ===
- Ambrose Askin, (1909-1979), Castleford, Keighley & Featherstone player
- Tom Askin, (1905-1976), GB international, Featherstone, Leeds & Castleford player

=== Aston family ===
- Cory Aston, (born 1995), Sheffield Eagles, Leeds Rhinos, Featherstone Rovers, Bradford Bulls, Castleford Tigers, Newcastle Thunder, London Broncos & Halifax Panthers player, son of Mark
- Mark Aston, (born 1967), GB international, Sheffield Eagles, Bramley & Featherstone Rovers player, father of Cory

=== Aubusson brothers ===
- James Aubusson (born 1986), Sydney Roosters NRL player
- Mitchell Aubusson (born 1987), Sydney Roosters NRL player

=== Ayshford family ===
- Blake Ayshford, (born 1988), Wests Tigers, Cronulla Sharks & NZ Warriors player, nephew of Bruce
- Bruce Ayshford, (born 1948), Eastern Suburbs player, uncle of Blake

== B ==
=== Bai family ===
- Cooper Bai, (born 2006), Gold Coast Titans player, son of Marcus
- Marcus Bai, (born 1972), PNG international, Hull FC, Gold Coast Chargers, Melbourne Storm, Leeds Rhinos & Bradford Bulls player, father of Cooper

=== Bailey brothers of Australia ===
- Phil Bailey (born 1981), Australian international, New South Wales representative and Manly-Warringah/Northern Eagles/Cronulla NRL player
- Chris Bailey (born 1982), Newcastle Knights and Manly-Warringah NRL player

=== Bailey family of New Zealand ===
- Roger Bailey, New Zealand international and brother of Gary and Bob
- Bob Bailey, New Zealand international coach and brother of Roger and Gary
- David Bailey, New Zealand Māori representative and son of Roger

=== Baitieri family ===
- Tas Baitieri, Penrith and Canterbury-Bankstown NSWRL player, France international coach; father of Jason
- Jason Baitieri (born 1989), France international and Sydney Roosters NRL player; son of Tas

=== Banks/Saxton family ===
- Alan Banks, (born 1965), Featherstone Rover player, uncle of Nicky & Tommy
- Tommy Saxton, (born 1983), Castleford Tigers, Hull FC, Wakefield Trinity Wildcats, Salford City Reds, Featherstone Rovers & Halifax player, brother of Nicky & nephew of Alan

=== Barclay brothers ===
- Frank Barclay/Hauauru Pakere; New Zealand international and New Zealand Māori representative
- Glen Barclay/Punga Pakere; North Sydney Bears and New Zealand Māori representative

=== Barchard family ===
- Des Barchard, (1922-1987), New Zealand & US international, Marist & Howick Hornets player, nephew of Len
- Len Barchard, (1909-1975), New Zealand international, City Rovers, Devonport United & Marist Old Boys player, uncle of Des

=== Barlow brothers ===
- Josh Barlow, (born 1991), Scotland international, Halifax & Swinton Lions player
- Sam Barlow, (born 1988), Scotland international, Widnes Vikings, Sheffield Eagles, Halifax, Featherstone Rovers, Leigh Centurions & Bradford Bulls player

=== Barnes family ===
- Keith Barnes (b. 1934 in Wales), Australian international player; cousin of Gwyl
- Gwyl Barnes, Eastern Suburbs NSWRFL player; cousin of Keith

=== Barrow family ===
- Frank Barrow, (born 1943), St Helens & Leigh RLFC player, brother of Tony Sr, uncle of Scott & Tony Jr
- Scott Barrow, (born 1980), St Helens player, brother of Tony Jr & son of Tony Sr
- Tony Barrow Jr., (1971-2017), Oldham & Swinton player, brother of Scott & son of Tony Sr
- Tony Barrow Sr., (born 1944), St Helens & Leigh player, father of Scott & Tony Jr

=== Barton brothers ===
- Jack Barton, Wigan player
- Tom Barton, (1883-1958), England international & St Helens player

=== Batchelor brothers ===
- James Batchelor (born 1998); Wakefield Trinity, brother of Joe
- Joe Batchelor (born 1994); Coventry Bears, York City Knights & St Helens, brother of James

=== Batten family ===
- Billy Batten, English international and Hunslet RFL player; father of Billy, Jr., Eric and Bob and grandfather of Ray
- Eric Batten, English international and Hunslet RFL player; son of Billy, brother of Billy, Jr. and Bob, and uncle of Ray
- Ray Batten, English international and Leeds RFL player; grandson of Billy, son of Billy, Jr. and nephew of Eric and Bob

=== Battye family ===
- Colin Battye, (1936-2018), Castleford player, brother of Malcolm
- Malcolm Battye, (born 1941), Castleford & Doncaster player, brother of Colin

=== Beardmore brothers ===
- Bob Beardmore, Castleford RFL player
- Kevin Beardmore, Great Britain international representative and Castleford RFL player

=== Beaven brothers ===
- Mark Beaven (born 1958), Balmain, Western Suburbs & Eastern Suburbs player, brother of Paul
- Paul Beaven (born 1964), Western Suburbs, Balmain & North Sydney player, brother of Mark

=== Beckett brothers ===
- Lenny Beckett (born 1980), Newcastle Knights & Northern Eagles; brother of Robbie
- Robbie Beckett (born 1972), Penrith Panthers, Halifax RLFC & Wests Tigers; brother of Lenny

=== Bella brothers ===
- Anthony Bella, South Queensland Crushers
- Martin Bella, Australian international, Queensland representative and North Sydney/Manly-Warringah/Canterbury/North Queensland/Gold Coast player

=== Belsham brothers ===
- Sel Belsham, New Zealand international
- Vic Belsham, New Zealand international

=== Bell/Friend family ===
- Cameron Bell, New Zealand Māori international coach; brother of George, Ian and Cathy and father of Dean
- Dean Bell (born 1962), New Zealand international player and Leeds Rhinos coach; son of Cameron, nephew of George, Ian and Cathy, cousin of Clayton and Glenn
- Clayton Friend, New Zealand international; cousin of Dean.
- Glenn Bell, rugby league footballer of the 1980s and 1990s

=== Benausse family ===
- Gilbert Benausse, French international
- Patrice Benausse, son of Gilbert, French international
- Rene Benausse, brother of Gilbert, French international

=== Bennett brothers ===
- Bob Bennett, Australian player and coach
- Wayne Bennett, Australian player, Queensland representative and supercoach

=== Bennett / Metcalfe family ===
- Ernest Bennett, (1879-1921), Wakefield Trinity player, maternal grandfather of Donald
- Donald Metcalfe, (1932-2006), Featherstone Rovers & Wakefield Trinity player, grandson of Ernest

=== Bentley brothers ===
- Andrew Bentley (born 1985), France international and Catalans Dragons player
- Kane Bentley (born 1987), France international and Catalans Dragons player

=== Berrigan brothers ===
- Barry Berrigan (born 1975), Brisbane Broncos player
- Shaun Berrigan (born 1978), Australian international and Queensland interstate representative, and Brisbane Broncos player

=== Best family ===
- Bradman Best, (born 2001), Newcastle Knights player, son of Roger
- Roger Best, (born 1974), London Broncos player, father of Bradman

=== Bevan family ===
- Brian Bevan (1924–1991), Eastern Suburbs NSWRFL player and son of Rick

=== Bischoff family ===
- Billy Bischoff Jr. (1938-2023), Balmain player, son of Billy
- Billy Bischoff (1912-1988), Balmain player, father of Billy

=== Bishop family ===
- Paul Bishop, (born 1967), GB U-21 international, Warrington, Cronulla Sharks, St Helens, Gold Coast Seagulls & Halifax RLFC player, son of Tommy
- Tommy Bishop, (born 1940), GB international, Blackpool Borough, Barrow, St Helens, Cronulla Sharks & Northern Suburbs player, father of Paul

=== Blair brothers ===
- Cameron Blair, (born 1966), Western Suburbs, Parramatta Eels, Western Reds & Adelaide Rams player
- Chris Blair, (born 1964), Penrith Panthers & Western Suburbs player

=== Blake brothers ===
- Michael Blake (born 1961), Manly Warringah, Canberra and South Sydney NSWRL player
- Phil Blake (born 1963), New South Wales Origin representative, Manly Warringah/South Sydney/North Sydney/Canberra/St George/Auckland NSWRL player, Warrington/Wigan RFL player

=== Blan brothers ===
- Albert Blan, England international, Swinton, Centre, Loose forward, later Coach.
- Billy Blan, Great Britain & England international, Wigan, Leeds & St. Helens, Second-row/Loose forward.
- Jackie Blan, Wigan & Salford Loose forward.

=== Blore brothers ===
- Dean Blore, (born 1998), Samoa international player, brother of Shawn
- Shawn Blore, (born 2000), Samoa international, Wests Tigers & Melbourne Storm player, brother of Dean

=== Boas brothers ===
- Ase Boas, (born 1988), PNG international, PNG Hunters & Featherstone Rovers player, brother of Watson
- Watson Boas, (born 1994), PNG international, PNG Hunters, Featherstone Rovers & Doncaster RLFC player, brother of Ase

=== Bolewski brothers ===
- Mick Bolewski (1888–1974), Australian international, Queensland interstate and Bundaberg player
- Henry Bolewski, Australian international, Queensland interstate, and Glebe and Newtown NSWRFL player; Wales international coach
- Alex Bolewski, Glebe and Newtown NSWRFL player

=== Bolt brothers ===
- Herbert Bolt, (1893-1916), Newtown & NSW player, brother of Percy
- Percy Bolt, (1885-1953), Western Suburbs & Annandale, brother of Herbert

=== Bostock family ===
- Indie Bostock, St George Illawarra Dragons (NRLW) player, sister of Jack & daughter of Josh
- Jack Bostock, (born 2003), Dolphins player, brother of Indie & son of Josh
- Josh Bostock, (born 1974), Balmain Tigers, Wakefield Trinity & Oldham player, father of Indie & Jack

=== Bowen family ===
- Matt Bowen (born 1982), Australian international, Queensland Origin representative and North Queensland Cowboys NRL player; cousin of Brenton
- Brenton Bowen (born 1983), North Queensland Cowboys and Gold Coast Titans NRL player; cousin of Matt
- Javid Bowen (born 1993), North Queensland Cowboys NRL player; nephew of Matt and Brenton

=== Bonal brothers ===
- Élie Bonal (born 1945), France international & AS Carcassonne player, brother of Jean-Marie
- Jean-Marie Bonal (born 1943), France international & AS Carcassonne player, brother of Élie

=== Boudebza family ===
- Hadj Boudebza (born 1966), France international, Saint-Hippolyte, AS Saint-Estève, Paris Saint-Germain & Limoux player, father of John
- John Boudebza (born 1990), France international, Saint-Esteve, SM Pia XIII, Lézignan Sangliers, Hull Kingston Rovers, London Broncos & Palau Broncos player, son of Hadj

=== Boyle family ===
- David Boyle (born 1971), Canberra Raiders & Bradford Bulls, father of Morgan & Millie
- Millie Boyle (born 1998), Australia, NSW, Brisbane Broncos, daughter of David, wife of Adam Boyle
- Morgan Boyle (born 1996), Gold Coast Titans & Manly Sea Eagles; son of David
- Jason Croker (born 1973), Australia international, Canberra Raiders & Catalans Dragons player, uncle of Lachlan, Millie & Morgan, and brother-in-law of David Boyle
- Lachlan Croker (born 1996), Canberra Raiders & Manly Sea Eagles player, nephew of Jason
- Adam Elliott (born 1994), Canterbury Bulldogs, Canberra Raiders & Newcastle Knights player, husband of Millie

=== Bradshaw brothers ===
- Bill Bradshaw, (died 2017), Featherstone Rovers, Bramley RLFC, Bradford Northern, Hull KR & Doncaster RLFC player, brother of Harry
- Harry Bradshaw, England international, Dewsbury & Huddersfield player, brother of Bill

=== Bradstreet family ===
- Bill Bradstreet (born 1945), Australia international & Manly; father of Darren & son of Fred
- Darren Bradstreet (born 1974), Illawarra Steelers & London Broncos; son of Bill

=== Brailey brothers ===
- Blayke Brailey (born 1998), Cronulla Sharks player, brother of Jayden
- Jayden Brailey (born 1996), Cronulla Sharks & Newcastle Knights player, brother of Blayke

=== Branighan family ===
- Ray Branighan (born 1947), Australian international, New South Wales representative and South Sydney/Manly-Warringah player; brother of Arthur and uncle of Luke
- Arthur Branighan (born 1943), South Sydney Rabbitohs NSWRFL player; brother of Ray, father of Luke
- Luke Branighan (born 1981), St George Illawarra and Cronulla Sharks NRL player; son of Arthur, nephew of Ray

=== Brennan brothers ===
- Joe Brennan (1908-1949), St George & South Sydney player, brother of Len
- Len Brennan (1911-1943), St George player, brother of Joe

=== Bridge brothers ===
- Chris Bridge (born 1984), England & Ireland international, Bradford Bulls, Warrington Wolves, Swinton Lions & Widnes; brother of Danny
- Danny Bridge (born 1993), Ireland international, Warrington Wolves, Rochdale Hornets & Oldham RLFC; brother of Chris

=== Bridges family ===
- John Keith Bridges, (born 1952), GB & England international, Featherstone Rovers, Bradford Northern & Hull FC player, son of Keith
- Keith Bridges, (1929-2014), Wakefield Trinity & Castleford player, father of John

=== Brimble brothers ===
- Ted Brimble, New Zealand international
- Walter Brimble, New Zealand international
- Wilfred Brimble, New Zealand international

=== Briscoe brothers ===
- Jack Briscoe, (born 1991), Hull FC, Featherstone Rovers & York Knights player
- Luke Briscoe, (born 1994), Leeds Rhinos, Wakefield Trinity Wildcats, Hunslet Hawks, Featherstone Rovers & Doncaster RLFC player
- Tom Briscoe, (born 1990), Hull FC, Leeds Rhinos & Leigh Leopards player

=== Britt family ===
- Dean Britt (born 1994), Melbourne, South Sydney & Canterbury, son of Darren
- Darren Britt (born 1969), Australia & NSW Country, Western Suburbs, Canterbury & St Helens; father of Dean

=== Broatch / Fiddes ===
- Andrew Broatch, Commonwealth XIII & Other Nationalities international, Leeds, Bradford Northern, Hunslet & York Wasps player, nephew of Alex
- Alex Fiddes, (1914-1998), British Empire XIII international, Huddersfield & Castleford player, uncle of Andrew

=== Bromwich brothers ===
- Jesse Bromwich (born 1989), New Zealand international and Melbourne Storm NRL player
- Kenny Bromwich (born 1991), New Zealand international and Melbourne Storm NRL player

=== Broughton family ===
- George Broughton England international, Leeds & Hunslet player, father of George Jr.
- George Broughton Jr. Castleford & Leeds RLFC player, son of George

=== Buchanan brothers ===
- Austin Buchanan (born 1984), London Broncos, Wakefield Trinity, Dewsbury & York City Knights; half-brother of Jamie & Jodie
- Jamie Jones-Buchanan (born 1981), GB & England international, Leeds Rhinos; half-brother of Austin & Jodie
- Jodie Broughton, (born 1988), England Knights, Leeds Rhinos, Hull FC, Salford City Reds, Huddersfield Giants, Oldham, Catalans Dragons, Toulouse Olympique, Halifax & Batley Bulldogs player, half-brother of Jamie & Austin

=== Buckler brothers ===
- Arthur Buckler (1882–1921), Wales & Salford; brother of Herbert
- Herbert Buckler (1878–1957), Salford & Other Nationalities; brother of Arthur

=== Bugden brothers ===
- Geoff Bugden (born 1960), New South Wales representative, Parramatta and Newtown NSWRL player
- Mark Bugden (born 1961), Newtown, Canterbury-Bankstown and Parramatta NSWRL player

=== Bukowski family ===
- Cameron Bukowski, (born 2005), Brisbane Broncos player, son of Gary
- Gary Bukowski, (born 1966), Souths Logan Magpies & Western Suburbs player, father of Cameron

=== Burge brothers ===
- Albert Burge (1889–1943), South Sydney and Glebe NSWRFL player, Australian rugby international
- Laidley Burge (1897–1990), Glebe NSWRFL player
- Frank Burge (1894–1958), Australian international and New South Wales representative, Glebe/St George NSWRFL player, St George/Eastern Suburbs/North Sydney/Canterbury-Bankstown/Newtown/North Sydney/Western Suburbs NSWRFL coach
- Peter Burge (1884–1956), Dual Australian rugby international, St George/Glebe NSWRFL player, St George NSWRFL coach

=== Burgess family I ===
The Burgess' total of 30 Tests is a Great British record for a father and son combination.

- William Burgess Sr. (1897–1968), England international, Barrow RFL player; father of William Jr
- William Burgess Jr. (born 1939), Great Britain and England international, Barrow and Salford RFL player; son of William Sr

=== Burgess family II ===
- Luke Burgess (born 1987), Leeds/Doncaster/Harlequins/Salford/Catalans SL player, South Sydney/Manly-Warringah NRL player; son of Mark and brother of Sam, Tom and George.
- Sam Burgess (born 1988), English international, Bradford SL and South Sydney NRL player; son of Mark and brother of Luke, Tom and George
- Tom Burgess (born 1992), English international, Bradford SL and South Sydney NRL player; son of Mark and brother of Sam, Luke and George
- George Burgess (born 1992), English international and South Sydney NRL player; son of Mark and brother of Sam, Luke and Tom

=== Burke family ===
- Brad Burke (born 1963), Eastern Suburbs NSWRL player; son of Peter, brother of Matt
- Matt Burke (born 1964), Manly-Warringah and Eastern Suburbs NSWRL player; son of Peter, brother of Brad

=== Butcher brothers ===
- Egan Butcher, (born 2000), Sydney Roosters player, brother of Nat
- Nat Butcher, (born 1997), Sydney Roosters player, brother of Egan

=== Butler family ===
- Harata Butler, (born 1993), NZ international, Cronulla Sharks, Nth Qld Cowboys & New Zealand Warriors player, cousin of Rima
- Rima Butler, (born 1997), Australia international, Parramatta Eels, Newcastle Knights & Sydney Roosters player, cousin of Harata

== C ==
=== Caine brothers ===
- Jess Caine (born 1984), South Sydney Rabbitohs NRL player
- Joel Caine (born 1978), St. George Dragons/Balmain Tigers/Wests Tigers NRL player
- Tony Caine (born 1986), Cronulla Sharks and St. George Illawarra Dragons NRL player

=== Calder/Pongia family ===
- Jim Calder, New Zealand international, grandfather of Quentin Pongia
- Quentin Pongia, New Zealand international, grandson of Jim Calder

=== Campbell family ===
- Preston Campbell

Gold Coast titans legend

- Jayden Campbell Gold Coast Titans Fullback, son of Preston

=== Capewell family ===
- Kurt Capewell, (born 1993), Cronulla Sharks, Penrith Panthers, Brisbane Broncos & New Zealand Warriors player, cousin of Luke
- Luke Capewell, (born 1989), South Sydney Rabbitohs, Gold Coast Titans & Brisbane Broncos, player, cousin of Kurt

=== Carlaw brothers ===
- Arthur Carlaw, New Zealand international
- James Carlaw, New Zealand administrator

=== Carmichael family ===
- Alf Carmichael, England international & Hull KR; father of George
- George Carmichael, Hull KR, Bradford Northern & Hull FC; son of Alf

=== Cartwright family ===
- Bryce Cartwright (born 1994), Penrith Panthers player; son of Dave, nephew of John, Michael and Cliff
- Jed Cartwright (born 1997), Penrith Panthers player; son of John. nephew of Dave, Cliff and Michael
- John Cartwright (born 1965), Penrith Panthers player, 1991 premiership winner, NSW and Australian Rep player, Gold Coast Titans coach; father of Jed and uncle of Bryce, brother of Cliff, Dave and Michael
- Dave Cartwright Penrith Panthers player; father of Bryce, uncle of Jed, brother of Cliff, Michael and John
- Cliff Cartwright Penrith Panthers player; uncle of Bryce, uncle of Jed, brother of Dave, Michael and John
- Michael Cartwright Penrith Panthers player; uncle of Bryce, uncle of Jed, brother of Dave, Cliff and John

=== Casey family ===
- Callum Casey (born 1990), Ireland international, Leeds Rhinos, Halifax, Hunslet & Batley; son of Leo
- Leo Casey (born 1965), Ireland international, Oldham RLFC, Featherstone Rovers & Swinton Lions; father of Callum, Connor, Patrick & Sean

=== Cayless brothers ===
- Nathan Cayless (born 1978), New Zealand international and Parramatta Eels player
- Jason Cayless (born 1980), New Zealand international and Parramatta, Sydney Roosters, St Helens RLFC & Wests Tigers player

=== Chan family ===
- Alex Chan Melbourne Storm forward
- Tiaki Chan Wigan Warriors forward
- Joe Chan Melbourne Storm forward
- Willie McLean, brother-in-law of Alex

=== Chapelhow brothers ===
- Jay Chapelhow (born 1995), Widnes Vikings & Newcastle Thunder, twin brother of Ted
- Ted Chapelhow (born 1995), Widnes Vikings & Newcastle Thunder, twin brother of Jay

=== Chapman family ===
- Damien Chapman (born 1974), St George, Western Reds & London Broncos player, son of John
- John Chapman (born 1954), St George & Parramatta, father of Damien

=== Charles family ===
- Chris Charles, (born 1976), England international, Hull Kingston Rovers, Castleford Tigers & Salford player, father of Jack
- Jack Charles, (born 2006), Hull FC, Doncaster RLFC, Hull Kingston Rovers & Goole Vikings player, son of Chris

=== Charlton family ===
- Ken Charlton, (1923-2012), Canterbury-Bankstown player, brother of Neville & father of Phil
- Neville Charlton, (1928-2014), Canterbury-Bankstown, Western Suburbs & Eastern Suburbs player, brother of Ken & uncle of Phil
- Phil Charlton, (1950-2021), Canterbury-Bankstown & Newtown player, nephew of Neville & son of Ken

=== Cherrington family ===
- Anthony Cherrington, (born 1988), Sydney Roosters & South Sydney player, cousin of Kennedy & Manaia
- Kennedy Cherrington, (born 1999), Sydney Roosters & Parramatta Eels player, cousin of Anthony & Manaia
- Manaia Cherrington, (born 1994), Wests Tigers player, cousin of Anthony & Kennedy

=== Chisholm family ===
- Dane Chisholm, (born 1990), France international, Melbourne Storm, Hull Kingston Rovers, Bradford Bulls, Sheffield Eagles, Featherstone Rovers, London Broncos & Keighley Cougars player, son of Rick, nephew of Wayne
- Rick Chisholm, (1959-2007), Manly-Warringah & Newtown player, father of Dane, brother of Wayne
- Wayne Chisholm, (born 1964), Manly Sea Eagles, South Sydney & North Sydney player, brother of Rick & uncle of Dane

=== Chisnall brothers ===
- Dave Chisnall (1948–2013), Great Britain and England international, St Helens and Warrington RFL player
- Eric Chisnall (born 1946), Great Britain and England international, St Helens and Leigh RFL player

=== Clark brothers ===
- Abe Clark (1894-1973), St George player, brother of Jack
- Jack Clark (1897–1973), Newtown & St George player, brother of Abe

=== Clark family ===
- Mitch Clark (born 1993), Doncaster, Bradford Bulls, Hull Kingston Rovers, York City Knights, Castleford Tigers, Featherstone Rovers, Halifax, Leigh Centurions, Wigan Warriors, Newcastle Thunder & Sheffield Eagles player, son of Trevor
- Trevor Clark (born 1962), Leeds, York Wasps, Featherstone Rovers & Bradford Northern player, father of Mitch

=== Clarke brothers ===
- Paul Clarke (born 1964), Balmain, Penrith Panthers & Parramatta Eels player, brother of Peter
- Peter Clarke (born 1974), Manly Sea Eagles, Eastern Suburbs, Adelaide Rams & South Sydney player, brother of Paul

=== Clarke family ===
- Colin Clarke, (born 1945), Great Britain international, Wigan, Salford & Leigh player, father of Phil
- Phil Clarke, (born 1971), Great Britain & England international, Wigan & Sydney Roosters player, son of Colin

=== Clarkson family ===
- Chris Clarkson, (born 1990), Leeds Rhinos, Widnes Vikings, Hull Kingston Rovers, Castleford Tigers & York Knights player, son of Micky
- Micky Clarkson, Wakefield Trinity & Featherstone Rovers player, father of Chris

=== Cleal family ===
- Noel Cleal (born 1958), Australian international, New South Wales representative, Eastern Suburbs/Manly-Warringah NSWRL and Widnes/Hull RFL player, Hull RFL coach; brother of Les; father of Kane
- Kane Cleal (born 1984), Manly-Warringah/South Sydney/Canterbury-Bankstown NRL player; son of Noel

=== Cleary family ===
- Ivan Cleary (born 1971), Manly-Warringah/North Sydney/Sydney City/New Zealand Warriors NRL player, New Zealand Warriors/Penrith and Wests Tigers coach; father of Nathan
- Nathan Cleary (born 1997), Penrith NRL player; son of Ivan & brother of Jett

=== Clough brothers ===
- John Clough (born 1984), Salford City Reds, London Broncos, Halifax, Leigh Centurions, Blackpool Panthers, Oldham & Oxford Rugby League player, brother of Paul
- Paul Clough (born 1987), England Knights international, St. Helens, Whitehaven, Widnes Vikings, Bradford Bulls & Huddersfield Giants player, brother of John

=== Cogger family ===
- Jack Cogger, (born 1997), Newcastle Knights, Canterbury Bulldogs, Huddersfield Giants & Penrith Panthers, player, son of Trevor & nephew of John
- John Cogger, (born 1963), Western Suburbs, Runcorn Highfield & Oldham RLFC player, uncle of Jack & brother of Trevor
- Trevor Cogger, (born 1961), Western Suburbs & Leigh player, father of Jack & brother of John

=== Coleman brothers ===
- Jermaine Coleman, (born 1982), Jamaica international, Hunslet Hawks, Gateshead Thunder, York City Knights, London Skolars & Hemel Stags player, brother of Jy-mel
- Jy-mel Coleman, (born 1988), Jamaica international, London Skolars, York City Knights, Keighley Cougars, Dewsbury Rams, Hemel Stags, Newcastle Thunder & Hunslet RLFC player, brother of Jermaine

=== Connell family ===
- Cyril Connell, Sr. (1899–1974) Queensland representative and QRL club player; father of Cyril, Jr.
- Cyril Connell, Jr. (born 1928) Australian international, Queensland representative and QRL club player; son of Cyril, Sr.

=== Collins brothers ===
- Herbie Collins (1888-1959), Eastern Suburbs, brother of Reg
- Reg Collins (1885-1957), cricketer, brother of Herbie

=== Cologni family ===
- Aurélien Cologni (born 1978), France international coach & player, Catalans Dragons, Crusaders RL & Lézignan Sangliers player, son of Jean-Jacques Cologni
- Jean-Jacques Cologni (born 1951), France international, La Réole & XIII Catalan player, father of Aurélien

=== Cooper brothers ===
- Lionel Cooper (1922–1987), Australian international, New South Wales representative and Eastern Suburbs NSWRFL and Huddersfield RFL player
- Cec Cooper (born 1926), Queensland representative and Canterbury-Bankstown NSWRFL player and coach

=== Coote family ===
- Jack Coote (1907–1986), Eastern Suburbs NSWRFL player; father of Ron
- Ron Coote (born 1944), Australian international and New South Wales representative and South Sydney and Eastern Suburbs NSWRFL player; son of Jack

=== Corbett brothers ===
- Claude Corbett (1885–1944), rugby league journalist;
- Harold Corbett (1890–1917), Eastern Suburbs and Annandale NSWRFL player

=== Cornish brothers ===
- Mitch Cornish, (born 1993), Canberra Raiders & Sydney Roosters player, brother of Tyler
- Tyler Cornish, (born 1994), Gold Coast Titans player, brother of Mitch

=== Corvo brothers ===
- Alex Corvo, Canberra Raiders; brother of Mark
- Mark Corvo (born 1973), Canberra Raiders, Adelaide Rams, Brisbane broncos & Salford; brother of Alex

=== Couchman twins ===
- Ryan Couchman (born 2003), St George Illawarra player; twin brother of Toby
- Toby Couchman (born 2003), St George Illawarra player; twin brother of Ryan

=== Courtney family ===
- Ed Courtney Jr. (1905-1986), Western Suburbs & St George, son of Ted & brother of Harry
- Harry Courtney (1908-1936), St George & Canterbury player, son of Tedda & brother of Ed
- Tedda Courtney (1885-1957), Australia international, NSW, Newtown, Western Suburbs & North Sydney, father of Harry & Ed

=== Cowan brothers ===
- Ronnie Cowan, (born 1941), Other Nationalities international, Leeds, Hull FC & Keighley player, brother of Stan
- Stan Cowan, (1931-2015), Hull FC player, brother of Ronnie

=== Coyle brothers ===
- James Coyle (born 1985), Wigan Warriors player
- Thomas Coyle (born 1988), Wigan Warriors player

=== Coyne brothers ===
- Peter Coyne (born 1964), St George Dragons NSWRL player
- Mark Coyne (born 1967), Australian international, Queensland representative and St George and St George Illawarra NRL player

=== Cronin/Quinn cousins ===
- Mick Cronin, (born 1951), Australia international, Gerringong & Parramatta Eels player, cousin of Ron
- Ron Quinn, (born 1961), Parramatta Eels & Cronulla-Sutherland Sharks player, cousin of Mick

=== Crooks family ===
- Ben Crooks, (born 1993), Hull FC, Doncaster RLFC, Parramatta Eels, Castleford Tigers, Leigh Centurions, Hull Kingston Rovers, Keighley Cougars & Halifax Panthers player, son of Lee & nephew of Steve
- Lee Crooks, (born 1963), GB & England international, Hull FC, Western Suburbs, Balmain Tigers, Leeds & Castleford player, father of Ben & brother-in-law of Steve
- Steve Norton, (born 1951), GB & England international, Castleford, Manly, Hull FC & Wakefield player, brother-in-law of Lee & uncle of Ben

=== Cross family ===
- Paul Cross, Eastern Suburbs Roosters NSWRFL player and father of Ryan
- Ryan Cross (born 1979), Sydney Roosters NRL player and son of Paul

=== Cross brothers ===
- Ben Cross (born 1978), New South Wales State of Origin and Newcastle Knights NRL player
- Matt Cross (born 1981), Manly Sea Eagles NRL player

=== Cubitt brothers ===
- Les Cubitt (1893–1968), Australian international and New South Wales representative and Glebe NSWRFL player
- Charlie Cubitt (1891–1968), Glebe NSWRFL player

=== Cumberbatch brothers ===
- James Cumberbatch (1909-1972), England international and Broughton Rangers & Newcastle RLFC player, brother of Val
- Val Cumberbatch, (1911-1973), England international, and Barrow & Liverpool Stanley player, brother of James

=== Cunningham brothers ===
- Tommy Cunningham (born 1956), Wales international and St Helens player
- Eddie Cunningham, Great Britain and Wales international, and St Helens player
- Keiron Cunningham (born 1976), Great Britain and Wales international, and St Helens player

=== Crichton Brothers ===
- Stephen Crichton (born 2000) NRL bulldogs player
- Christian Crichton (born 1996) former NRL panthers and bulldogs player

== D ==
=== Dagger family ===
- Georgie Dagger, (born 1997), England Women international, Castleford Women & York Valkyrie player, wife of Will
- Will Dagger, (born 1999), Warrington Wolves, Hull Kingston Rovers, York City Knights, Leigh Centurions, Featherstone Rovers & Wakefield Trinity player, husband of Georgie

=== Delaney family ===
- Jim Delaney, Dewsbury Rams, Hemel Stags & Doncaster RLFC player, nephew of Paul
- Paul Delaney, (born 1968), GB U-21 international, Leeds RLFC & Dewsbury player, uncle of Jim

=== Daley family ===
- Doug Daley (1934–1994), Manly-Warringah NSWRFL player and administrator; father of Phil
- Phil Daley (born 1964), Australian international, New South Wales Origin representative and Manly-Warringah/Gold Coast Seagulls NSWRL player; son of Doug

=== Dalton brothers ===
- William Francis Dalton (1888–1956), Eastern Suburbs player (number 58); brother of Bernard.
- Bernard Hugh Dalton (1891–1929), Eastern Suburbs player (number 43).

=== Davidson brothers ===
- Bill Davidson, New Zealand international
- Ben Davidson (1902–1961), New Zealand international and Wigan RFL player
- George Davidson (1898–1948), Auckland representative

=== Davies brothers (1) ===
- Connor Davies (born 1997), Wales international & Halifax; twin brother of Curtis
- Curtis Davies (born 1997), Wales international, Halifax & Newcastle Thunder; twin brother of Connor

=== Davies brothers (2) ===
- Dan Davies, Other Nationalities international & Swinton; brother of Dai
- Dai Davies (born 1880), Wales international, Swinton, Salford & Leigh; brother of Dan

=== Davis brothers ===
- Matt Davis, (born 1996), London Broncos, Hemel Stags, London Skolars, Warrington Wolves, Rochdale Hornets & Leigh Leopards
- Sam Davis, (born 1998), London Broncos, Coventry Bears, York City Knights & Salford Red Devils

=== Davis family ===
The Davis family falls into the broader Dunghutti peoples family tree.

- Paul Davis (born 1971), Balmain player, father of Paul and Nakia
- Nakia Davis-Welsh (born 1996), Australian women's international

=== Dawson brothers ===
- Chris Dawson (born 1948), Newtown Jets, twin brother of Paul
- Paul Dawson (born 1948), Newtown Jets, twin brother of Chris

=== De Belin family ===
- Fred de Belin, Australian international and New South Wales interstate representative and Balmain NSWRFL player; grandfather of Jack
- Jack de Belin, St George Illawarra Dragons' 2011 Toyota Cup player of the year; grandson of Fred

=== Deane brothers/Sullivan family ===
- Os Deane (1890-1955), North Sydney player, brother of Sid
- Sid Deane (1885-1967), North Sydney, Oldham & Hull FC player, brother of Os, brother-in-law of Con, uncle of Bob
- Con Sullivan (1883-1964), Australia & New Zealand international, North Sydney player, brother-in-law of Sid, father of Bob
- Bob Sullivan (1931-2009), Australia & North Sydney player, son of Con, nephew of Sid

=== Dimond family ===
- Bobby Dimond, Australian international, New South Wales representative and Western Suburbs NSWRFL player; older brother of Peter and uncle of Craig
- Peter Dimond (1938–2021), Australian international, New South Wales representative and Western Suburbs NSWRFL player; younger brother of Bobby and father of Craig
- Craig Dimond (born 1964), Illawarra Steelers/Cronulla Sutherland Sharks/Canberra Raiders NSWRL player; son of Peter

=== Divorty family ===
- Gary Divorty, (born 1966), GB international, Hull FC, Gold Coast-Tweed Giants, Leeds, Halifax & Wakefield Trinity player, father of Ross
- Ross Divorty, (born 1988), Wales international, York City Knights, Doncaster RLFC, Featherstone Rovers & Halifax, son of Gary

=== Dixon/Butler family ===
- Colin Dixon, (1943-1993), GB & Wales international, Halifax, Salford & Hull Kingston Rovers player, maternal grandfather of Chester
- Chester Butler, (born 1995), Wales international, Halifax, South Wales Ironmen, Huddersfield Giants & Bradford Bulls player, grandson of Colin

=== Dorahy family ===
- John Dorahy (born 1954), Australian international, New South Wales representative and Western Suburbs/Manly-Warringah/Illawarra Steelers/North Sydney Bears NSWRL and Hull KR/Halifax RFL player and Super League coach; father of Dane
- Dane Dorahy (born 1977), Western Suburbs NRL player and Wakefield Trinity and Halifax SL player; son of John

=== Doyle brothers (1) ===
- Joe Doyle, Brothers (Toowoomba), Australia international and Queensland interstate representative player; brother of Ian
- Ian Doyle, All Whites (Toowoomba), Australia international and Queensland interstate representative player; brother of Joe

=== Doyle brothers (2) ===
- Jeff Doyle, (born 1967), Newcastle Knights, North Sydney Bears, Hull FC & Western Reds player; brother of Rod
- Rod Doyle, (born 1969), St. George, Eastern Suburbs, South Queensland & Sheffield Eagles player; brother of Jeff

=== Drake twins ===
- Jim Drake (1931-2008), GB international, Hull FC & Hull KR player
- Bill Drake (1931-2012), GB & England international, Hull FC, Leeds & York player

=== Dunemann brothers ===
- Ian Dunemann, North Queensland Cowboys NRL player
- Andrew Dunemann (born 1976), Gold Coast Seagulls/North Queensland/South Sydney/Canberra NRL player and Halifax/Leeds/Salford SL player. Canberra coach (2013)

=== Dunghutti relatives ===
The Dunghutti are an Indigenous Australian people native to the North-East of New South Wales, including the townships of Kempsey and Macksville. Many players with connections to the tribe are distantly related and refer to each other as cousins. This family tree includes:

- The Davis family
- The Roberts family
- Greg Inglis
- Albert Kelly, first cousin once removed of Preston Campbell, great nephew of Joseph Donovan
- Preston Campbell, first cousin once removed of Albert Kelly
- Brian Kelly
- Adrian Davis
- Beau Champion
- Matt Donovan

=== Dwyer / Kerr family ===
- Brad Dwyer, (born 1992), Warrington Wolves, Swinton Lions, Huddersfield Giants, London Broncos, Leeds Rhinos, Featherstone Rovers, Hull FC, Leigh Leopards, Salford Red Devils & Castleford Tigers player; cousin of Taylor
- Taylor Kerr (born 2006), Wigan Warriors, London Broncos & Salford RLFC player; cousin of Brad

=== Dykes family ===
- Adam Dykes (born 1977), Cronulla Sharks, Parramatta Eels, Cronulla Sharks & Hull FC player, father of Kade
- Kade Dykes (born 2002), Cronulla Sharks player, son of Adam

== E ==
=== Eccles brothers ===
- Cliff Eccles, (born 1967), Ireland international, Springfield Borough/Chorley Borough, Rochdale Hornets, Salford City Reds, Swinton Lions & Widnes Vikings player
- Bob Eccles, (born 1957), GB international, Warrington, Springfield Borough, Chorley Borough, Trafford Borough, Rochdale Hornets & Chorley Chieftains player

=== Eden family of Australia ===
- Harry Eden (1943–2006), Eastern Suburbs/St George/South Sydney NSWRFL player; uncle of Mike
- Mike Eden (born 1960), Manly-Warringah/Eastern Suburbs/Parramatta/Gold Coast Giants NSWRL player; nephew of Harry

=== Eden family of England ===
- Phil Eden (born 1963), Wakefield Trinity, Halifax & Castleford player; father of Greg
- Greg Eden (born 1990), Castleford Tigers, Huddersfield Giants, Hull KR, Brisbane Broncos, Halifax Panthers, Featherstone Rovers & Hunslet player; son of Phil

=== Edwards family (1) ===
- Jackie Edwards, Warrington RFL player; father of Shaun, brother of Bobby
- Shaun Edwards, Great Britain and England, Ireland international, Wigan/London/Bradford RFL/SL and Balmain NSWRL player; son of Jackie, nephew of Bobby

=== Edwards family (2) ===
- Morvin Edwards, (born 1968), NZ international, Upper Hutt Tigers, Swinton, Leeds, Balmain Tigers & Penrith Panthers player; son of Sam
- Sam Edwards, NZ international player; father of Morvin

=== Edwards/Tamou family ===
- Kenny Edwards (born 1989), Parramatta Eels, Catalans Dragons, Huddersfield Giants & Castleford Tigers player; cousin of James
- James Tamou (born 1988), Australian international, New South Wales Origin representative, and North Queensland Cowboys, Penrith Panthers & Wests Tigers NRL player; cousin of Kenny

=== Eisenhuth/Gallen family ===
- Matt Eisenhuth, (born 1992), Wests Tigers & Penrith Panthers player, cousin of Paul Gallen & Tom Eisenhuth
- Tom Eisenhuth, (born 1992), Penrith Panthers, Melbourne Storm & St George Illawarra Dragons player, cousin of Paul Gallen & Matt Eisenhuth
- Paul Gallen, (born 1981), Australia international & Cronulla Sharks player, cousin of Tom & Matt Eisenhuth

=== Elias/Moses family ===
- Benny Elias, Australian international, New South Wales representative, Balmain Tigers player; uncle of Mitchell.
- Mitchell Moses, Wests Tigers player; nephew of Benny.

=== Ellis family ===
- Allan Ellis, Newtown NSWRFL player; brother of Keith and Tom; father of Greg
- Keith Ellis, Newtown NSWRFL player; brother of Allan and Tom; uncle of Greg
- Tom Ellis, Newtown NSWRFL player; brother of Allan and Keith; uncle of Greg
- Greg Ellis, Newtown NSWRFL player; son of Allan and nephew of Keith and Tom

=== El Masri family ===
- Hazem El Masri (born 1976), Lebanon and Australian international, New South Wales representative and Canterbury Bulldogs NRL player; brother of Samer
- Samer El Masri, Lebanon international; brother of Hazem

=== Endacott family ===
- Frank Endacott, New Zealand international coach; father of Shane
- Shane Endacott (born 1971), Hull RFL and Auckland Warriors SL/NRL player; son of Frank

=== England family ===
- Anthony England, (born 1986), Castleford Tigers, Batley Bulldogs, Gateshead Thunder, Dewsbury Rams, Featherstone Rovers, Warrington Wolves, Swinton Lions, Wakefield Trinity & Bradford Bulls player, nephew of Keith
- Keith England, (born 1964), GB international and Castleford player, uncle of Anthony

=== Evans brothers ===
- Ben Evans, (born 1992), Wales international, twin brother of Rhys
- Rhys Evans, (born 1992), Wales international, twin brother of Ben

=== Evans brothers (inter-war period) ===
- Bryn Evans (1899–1975), Swinton and Great Britain international
- Jack Evans (1871–1924), Swinton; father of Bryn & John
- Jack Evans (1897–1940), Swinton and Great Britain international

=== Evans/Cherry-Evans family ===
- Troy Evans, Norths Devils and Redcliffe Dolphins BRL (Brisbane) player; father of Daly Cherry-Evans
- Daly Cherry-Evans (born 1989), Australian international, Queensland Origin representative and Manly-Warringah NRL player; son of Troy Evans

== F ==
=== Fa'alogo brothers ===
- David Fa'alogo, (born 1980), NZ, Samoa & Exiles international, South Sydney, Huddersfield Giants & Newcastle Knights player, brother of Sala
- Sala Fa'alogo, (born 1977), Widnes Vikings player, brother of David

=== Fa'asuamaleaui brothers ===
- Tino Fa'asuamaleaui Gold Coast Titan Captain and Melbourne Storm premiership winner.
- Iszac Fa'asuamaleaui Gold Coast Titans player

=== Fages family ===
- Pascal Fages, France international & Pia player, father of Theo
- Théo Fages, France international captain, son of Pascal

=== Faifai Loa/Smith family ===
- Kalifa Faifai Loa, NRL player, cousin of Jeremy Smith.
- Jeremy Smith, New Zealand international, cousin of Kalifa.

=== Fainu brothers ===
- Latu Fainu (born 2005), Tonga international & Wests Tigers player, brother of Manase, Sione & Samuela, nephew of Tevita
- Manase Fainu (born 1998), Tonga international & Manly Sea Eagles player, brother of Latu, Sione & Samuela, nephew of Tevita
- Sione Fainu (born 2001), Wests Tigers player, brother of Latu, Manase & Samuela, nephew of Tevita
- Samuela Fainu (born 2004), Manly Sea Eagles & Wests Tigers player, brother of Latu, Manase & Sione, nephew of Tevita
- Tevita Amone (born 1980), Western Suburbs & North Qld Cowboys player, uncle of Latu, Manase, Sione & Samuela

=== Fairbank family ===
- Karl Fairbank, Great Britain international and Bradford player; son of Jack; brother of John, Dick and Mark; uncle of Jacob
- Jacob Fairbank, Huddersfield player; son of Mark

=== Farnsworth brothers ===
- Bill Farnsworth, (1887-1966), Australian international and Newtown NSWRFL player, brother of Roy & Viv
- Roy Farnsworth, (1892–1957), NSW, Newtown, Western Suburb NSWRFL player, brother of Bill & Viv
- Viv Farnsworth, (1891–1953), Australian international and Newtown NSWRFL player, brother of Bill & Roy

=== Farrell family ===
- Andy Farrell (born 1975), Great Britain international and dual England rugby international, and Wigan SL player; uncle of Liam, brother of Phil
- Phil Farrell (born 1980), Wigan, Oldham, Rochdale & Batley player; brother of Andy
- Liam Farrell (born 1990), England international representative and Wigan player; nephew of Andy
- Connor Farrell (born 1993), Wigan, Featherstone & Bradford player; brother of Liam, and nephew of Andy

=== Farrell/Elsegood family (1) ===
- Frank Farrell (1916–1985), Australian international, New South Wales representative and Newtown NSWRFL player and coach; grandfather of Jack Elsegood
- Jack Elsegood (born 1973), Manly-Warringah and Sydney Roosters player; grandson of Frank Farrell

=== Farrell family (2) ===
- Anthony Farrell (born 1969), England & Wales international, Huddersfield, Sheffield Eagles, Leeds Rhinos, Widnes Vikings & Halifax, father of Izaac & Joel
- Izaac Farrell (born 1998), Huddersfield Giants, Swinton Lions, Batley Bulldogs, Workington Town, Rochdale Hornets, Sheffield Eagles, Midlands Hurricanes & Keighley Cougars, son of Anthony & brother of Joel
- Joel Farrell (born 1994), Jamaica international, Dewsbury Rams, Gateshead Thunder, Batley Bulldogs & Sheffield Eagles, son of Anthony & brother of Izaac

=== Feagai brothers ===
- Mat Feagai (born 2001), St George Illawarra Dragons; twin brother of Max
- Max Feagai (born 2001), St George Illawarra Dragons; twin brother of Mat

=== Fearnley family ===
- Albert Fearnley, (1924-1999), Oldham RLFC & Halifax RLFC player, father of Stan
- Stan Fearnley, (born 1947), England international, Bradford Northern, Halifax & Leeds RLFC player, son of Albert

=== Fennell family ===
- Dale Fennell (born 1957), Featherstone Rovers, Wakefield Trinity & Bradford Northern; son of Jackie
- Jack Fennell (1933–2019), Featherstone Rovers; father of Dale

=== Fielden brothers ===
- Jamie Fielden (born 1978), London and Huddersfield Super League player
- Stuart Fielden (born 1979), England and Great Britain international and Bradford/Wigan/Huddersfield Super League player

=== Fifield family ===
- Cec Fifield, (1903-1957), Australia international, Western Suburbs, Balmain, Hull FC & Canterbury-Bankstown player, uncle of George and Jack
- George Fifield, Balmain & St George player, brother of Jack and nephew of Cec
- Jack Fifield, (1930-), Balmain & St George player, brother of George & nephew of Cec

=== Fifita/Haumono family ===
- Andrew Fifita (born 1989), Tongan and Australian international, New South Wales Origin representative and Wests Tigers/Cronulla Sharks NRL player; nephew of Solomon Haumono, twin brother of David.
- David Fifita (born 1989), Cronulla Sharks NRL player; nephew of Solomon Haumono, twin brother of Andrew.
- Latu Fifita (born 1987), Workington Town player; older brother of Andrew and David (above).
- David Fifita (born 2000), Queensland Origin representative and Brisbane Broncos NRL Player, cousin of Andrew and David Fifita.
- Solomon Haumono (born 1975), Australian (SL) and Tongan international, New South Wales SL representative and Manly-Warringah/Canterbury-Bankstown/Balmain Tigers/St George and London Broncos player; uncle of Andrew and David.
- Sosefo Fifita, (born 2003), Gold Coast Titans player, 2nd cousin of David (born 2000)

=== Finch family ===
- Robert Finch (born 1956), St George NSWRFL player and former Director of NRL referees
- Brett Finch (born 1981), New South Wales Origin representative, Canberra Raiders, Sydney Roosters, Parramatta Eels and Melbourne Storm NRL player and Wigan SL player; son of Robert

=== Fisher family ===
- Darryl Fisher, son of Kevin, former Western Suburbs player
- Kevin Fisher, New Zealand international

=== Fisher brothers ===
- Idwal Fisher (1935–2012), Wales international, Warrington & Bradford Northern; brother of Tony
- Tony Fisher (born 1943), GB & Wales international, Bradford Northern, Leeds & Castleford; brother of Idwal

=== Fisiiahi brothers ===
- David Fisiiahi, Tonga international player, twin brother of Paul & brother of Glen
- Glen Fisiiahi, (born 1990), Tonga international & New Zealand Warriors player, brother to David & Paul
- Paul Fisiiahi, Tonga international player, twin brother of Paul & brother of Glen

=== Fitzgibbon family ===
- Allan Fitzgibbon, Balmain NSWRFL player and Illawarra Steelers coach; father of Craig
- Craig Fitzgibbon (born 1977), Australian international, New South Wales Origin representative, Illawarra/St George Illawarra/Sydney Roosters NRL player and Hull F.C. SL player, NSW Country Origin coach; son of Allan

=== Flanagan of England ===
- Terry Flanagan, Great Britain international and Oldham RFL player; father of Mark
- Mark Flanagan (born 1987), Wests Tigers player and son of Terry

=== Flanagan of Australia ===
- Shane Flanagan (born 1965), former St. George Dragons, Western Suburbs Magpies, Parramatta Eels NSWRL player and Cronulla-Sutherland Sharks NRL coach; father of Kyle.
- Kyle Flanagan (born 1998), Cronulla-Sutherland Sharks NRL player; son of Shane.

=== Fleming family ===
- Doug Fleming, (1930-1998), St George player, son of Norm
- Norm Fleming, (1903-1964), St George player, father of Doug

=== Flynn brothers ===
- Adrian Flynn (born 1974), Wakefield Trinity, Castleford, Dewsbury, Featherstone Rovers & Batley Bulldogs; brother of Wayne
- Wayne Flynn (born 1976), Wakefield Trinity & Sheffield Eagles; brother of Adrian

=== Fogerty family ===
- Terry Fogerty, Great Britain international player; father of Adam
- Adam Fogerty, Halifax, St Helens and Warrington player; son of Terry

=== Folau family ===
- Israel Folau (born 1989), dual Australian international, Queensland Maroons representative, Melbourne Storm and Brisbane Broncos NRL player; GWS Giants AFL player; NSW Waratahs Super Rugby player.
- John Folau (b. 1994), Under 20s QLD Player and Parramatta Eels NYC Player, Waratahs player.

=== Foran brothers ===
- Liam Foran (born 1988), Melbourne Storm and Manly-Warringah NRL player, Salford and London SL player
- Kieran Foran (born 1990), New Zealand International and Manly-Warringah/Parramatta/New Zealand Warriors NRL player

=== Fox family ===
- Tom Fox, Featherstone Rovers player, father of Don, Neil & Peter
- Don Fox (born 1935), English international, Featherstone Rovers and Wakefield Trinity RFL player, brother of Neil & Peter, son of Tom
- Neil Fox (born 1939), English international, Wakefield Trinity and Hull KR player, brother of Don & Peter, son of Tom
- Peter Fox (born 1933), Wakefield Trinity, Featherstone Rovers and Hull KR player, and Great Britain national coach, brother of Neil & Don, son of Tom

=== French brothers ===
- Ian French (born 1960), Queensland representative, Wynnum-Manly BRL, Castleford RFL and North Sydney NSWRL player
- Brett French (born 1962), Queensland representative, Wynnum-Manly BRL and North Sydney/Gold Coast NSWRL player

=== Frodsham family ===
- Alf Frodsham (1902–1974), GB & England, St Helens & St Helens Recs; brother of Eric & Harry
- Eric Frodsham (1923–2003), St Helens & Warrington; brother of Alf & Harry

=== Fry brothers ===
- Ed Fry (1879–1968), NSW, South Sydney & North Sydney; brother of Fred
- Fred Fry (1885–1963), Eastern Suburbs and South Sydney; brother of Ed

=== Fulton family ===
- Bob Fulton, (1947–2021), Australian international player and coach, New South Wales representative and Manly-Warringah/Eastern Suburbs player and coach. Won 5 World Cups as a player and coach of Australia and 5 premierships with Manly-Warringah, Inaugural Rugby League Immortal; father of Scott and Brett & grandfather of Zac
- Brett Fulton (born 1975), Manly-Warringah player, uncle of Zac, brother of Scott & son of Bob
- Scott Fulton (born 1973), Manly-Warringah player, father of Zac, brother of Brett & son of Bob
- Zac Fulton (born 2001), Manly-Warringah & Bradford Bulls player, son of Scott, nephew of Brett & grandson of Bob

=== Furner family ===
- Don Furner, Sr. (born 1932), Australian international, Queensland representative and Toowoomba Souths player. Australian and Fijian international coach, Eastern Suburbs and Canberra Raiders NSWRL coach; father of David and Don, Jr.
- David Furner (born 1971), Australian international, New South Wales representative and Canberra Raiders, Wigan Warriors and Leeds Rhinos player and former Canberra Raiders coach; son of Don and brother of Don, Jr.

== G ==
=== Gale siblings ===
- Brett Gale, (born 1963), Western Suburbs, Eastern Suburbs & North Sydney player
- Scott Gale, (1965-2004), Western Suburbs, Eastern Suburbs, Balmain, North Sydney, Canberra Raiders & Hull FC player
- Tarsha Gale, Australia international player & NRLW commentator, sister of Brett & Scott

=== Galea brothers ===
- Brett Galea (born 1972); Brisbane Broncos and Adelaide Rams NRL player
- Paul Galea (born 1970); Gold Coast Seagulls and North Queensland Cowboys ARL player

=== Gannon family ===
- Jim Gannon, (born 1977), Balmain Tigers, Halifax Blue Sox, Huddersfield Giants, Hull Kingston Rovers & Widnes Vikings player, father of Morgan
- Morgan Gannon, (born 2003), Leeds Rhinos player, son of Jim

=== Gardner brothers ===
- Ade Gardner (born 1983), English international and Super League player
- Mat Gardner (born 1985), Super League player

=== Garlick family ===
- Sean Garlick South Sydney Rabbitohs player, father of Bronson
- Bronson Garlick Melbourne Storm player, son of Sean

=== Gartner family ===
- Joe Gartner (1912–2002), Newtown Jets and Canterbury-Bankstown NSWRL player; father of Clive, Jim and Ray and great-uncle of Russel
- Clive Gartner, Canterbury-Bankstown NSWRL player; son of Joe, brother of Jim and Ray and uncle of Russel and father of Daniel
- Ray Gartner (1934–1983), Canterbury-Bankstown NSWRL player; son of Joe, brother of Clive and Jim
- Russel Gartner (born 1955), Australian international, New South Wales representative and Manly-Warringah/Eastern Suburbs/Balmain NSWRL player; son of Jim, nephew of Clive, great-nephew of Joe and uncle of Daniel
- Daniel Gartner (born 1972), Australian representative and Manly-Warringah/Northern Eagles NRL and Bradford SL player; son of Clive and nephew of Russel

=== Garvey brothers ===
- Craig Garvey, (born 1993), St. George Illawarra & Canterbury Bulldogs player, brother of Grant
- Grant Garvey, (born 1996), Sydney Roosters player, brother of Craig

=== Gasnier family ===
- Reg Gasnier (1939–2014), Australian international, New South Wales representative and St. George NSWRFL player, inaugural Rugby League Immortal; uncle of Mark
- Mark Gasnier (born 1981), Australian international, New South Wales representative and St. George Illawarra NRL player; nephew of Reg
- Dennis Tutty (born 1945), Australian international, Balmain, Penrith & Eastern Suburbs; cousin of Reg
- Ian Tutty, (born 1937), Australian Olympic rower; brother of Dennis & cousin of Reg

=== Geelan family ===
- Allen Geelan, (born 1959), Canterbury Bankstown, Eastern Suburbs, Newtown Jets & Western Suburbs player, son of Col
- Col Geelan, (1927-1996), Australia international, Canterbury Bankstown & Newtown Jets player, father of Allen

=== George family ===
- Wilf George, Halifax RLFC player and father of Marcus and Luke
- Luke George (born 1987), Wakefield Trinity Wildcats player; son of Wilf and brother of Marcus

=== Geyer family ===
- Mark Geyer (born 1967), Australian international, New South Wales Origin representative and Penrith/Balmain/WA Reds player
- Matt Geyer (born 1975), New South Wales Origin representative and Penrith/WA Reds/Melbourne Storm player
- Mavrik Geyer Panthers 2nd row, son of Panthers' legend Mark Geyer, cousin of Cole, nephew of Matt

=== Gidley brothers ===
- Matt Gidley (born 1977), Australian international, New South Wales Origin representative and Newcastle Knights NRL and St Helens SL player
- Kurt Gidley (born 1982), Australian international, New South Wales Origin representative and Newcastle Knights NRL player

=== Gilbert family ===
- Bob Gilbert (1923–1991), St. George NSWRFL player; son of Herb, Sr. and brother of Herb, Jr. & Jack
- Herb Gilbert, Sr. (1888–1972), Australian international and St. George NSWRFL player; father of Herb, Jr. and Jack
- Herb Gilbert, Jr. (1917–1983), Balmain and St. George NSWRFL player; son of Herb, Sr. and brother of Jack & Bob
- Jack Gilbert (1918–1998), St. George NSWRFL player; son of Herb, Sr. and brother of Herb, Jr. & Bob

=== Gildart family ===
- Ian Gildart, (born 1969), Wigan, Wakefield Trinity, Oldham, Widnes Vikings & Lancashire Lynx player, father of Oliver
- Oliver Gildart, (born 1996), GB & England international, Wigan Warriors, Workington Town, Salford Red Devils, Wests Tigers, Sydney Roosters, Leigh Leopards & Hull Kingston Rovers player, son of Ian

=== Giteau family ===
- Ron Giteau (born 1955), Western Suburbs, Eastern Suburbs and Canberra player, father of:
- Kristy Giteau (born 1981), dual-code Australia women's international.
  - Kristy's younger brother Matt Giteau (born 1982) earned 92 caps with the Australia national rugby union team.

=== Gleeson family ===
- Martin Gleeson (born 1980), English international and Warrington Wolves player; brother of Mark and cousin of Sean
- Mark Gleeson (born 1982) Warrington Wolves player; brother of Martin and cousin of Sean
- Sean Gleeson (born 1987) Ireland international and Super League player; cousin of Martin and Mark

=== Goldspink family ===
- Kevin Goldspink, Kangaroo tourist 1967–68 and Canterbury/Easts player, father of Brett.
- Brett Goldspink (born 1971), Illawarra/Souths/Western Reds/Oldham/Wigan/St Helens/Halifax player, son of Kevin.

=== Goodwin family (1) ===
- Ted Goodwin (born 1953), Australian representative and NSWRFL player; father of Luke, Bronx and Bryson
- Luke Goodwin (born 1973), Canterbury-Bankstown Bulldogs and New Zealand Māori representative player; son of Ted and brother of Bronx and Bryson
- Bronx Goodwin (born 1984), New Zealand Māori representative and St George Illawarra Dragons NRL player; son of Ted and brother of Luke and Bryson
- Bryson Goodwin (born 1985) Canterbury-Bankstown Bulldogs/South Sydney Rabbitohs NRL player; son of Ted and brother of Luke and Bronx

=== Goodwin family (2) ===
- Lou Goodwin (born 1991), Canberra Raiders player; son of Matt
- Matt Goodwin (born 1960), Penrith Panthers, Parramatta Eels & South Sydney player; father of Lou

=== Gordon cousins ===
- Ashley Gordon (born 1969), Newcastle Knights and Penrith Panthers NRL player; second cousin of Isaac
- Isaac Gordon (born 1986), Cronulla-Sutherland Sharks NRL player; second cousin of Ashley

=== Gore family ===
- Billy Gore (1919–2010), St Helens & Warrington; son of Jack
- Jack Gore (1899–1971), GB & Wales international, Salford & Wigan Highfield; father of Billy

=== Gorley brothers ===
- Les Gorley (born 1950), Great Britain and England international, and Workington Town and Widnes RFL player
- Peter Gorley (born 1951), Great Britain and England international, and Workington Town and St Helens RFL player

=== Goulding family ===
- Bobbie Goulding (born 1972), GB & England, St Helens, Wigan, Leeds, Widnes, Wakefield Trinity, Huddersfield, Leigh, Rochdale Hornets & Barrow Raiders; father of Bobbie Jr.
- Bobbie Goulding Jr. (born 1993), Wakefield Trinity & Sydney Roosters; son of Bobbie

=== Gourley family ===
- Robin Gourley (born 1935), New South Wales representative and St. George NSWRFL player; father of Scott
- Scott Gourley (born 1968), dual Australian rugby international, New South Wales Origin representative and St. George and Sydney Roosters NSWRL player; son of Robin

=== Gowers family ===
- Ken Gowers (1936-2017), GB & England international & Swinton player, son of Walter
- Walter Gowers (1903-1965), GB international, Rochdale Hornets & St Helens player, father of Ken

=== Grace/Wellington ===
- Regan Grace, (born 1996), Wales international & St Helens player, cousin of Calvin
- Calvin Wellington, (born 1995), St Helens, Sheffield Eagles, Workington Town, Oldham RLFC & Rochdale Hornets player, cousin of Regan

=== Graham family (1) ===
- Brian Graham, New South Wales representative and St. George NSWRFL player; father of Philip
- Don Graham, St. George NSWRFL player, Hunslet, Featherstone & Parramatta; brother of Brian, uncle of Philip
- Philip Graham, St. George NSWRFL player; son of Brian

=== Graham family (2) ===
- George Graham, (born 1966), Scotland international & Carlisle RLFC player, father of Guy
- Guy Graham, (born 1998), Scotland international & Whitehaven RLFC player, son of George

=== Gray brothers ===
- Bert Gray (1890-1967), Australia international, NSW, Glebe NSWRL player, brother of Frank & Paddy
- Frank Gray (1905-1993), Glebe NSWRL player, brother of Bert & Paddy
- Paddy Gray (1892-1977), Glebe NSWRL player, brother of Bert & Frank

=== Greenwood brothers ===
- James Greenwood (born 1991), South Wales Scorpions, Wigan Warriors, Hull KR & Salford Red Devils; brother of Joe
- Joe Greenwood (born 1993), St Helens, Gold Coast Titans, Wigan Warriors, Huddersfield Giants; brother of James

=== Grésèque family ===
- Ivan Grésèque, French international and coach, father of Maxime
- Maxime Grésèque, French international, son of Ivan

=== Grey family ===
- Eric Grey, New Zealand international 1920
- Ian Grey, New Zealand international 1954–6; son of Eric

=== Griffin brothers ===
- Darrell Griffin (born 1981), England international, Wakefield Trinity Wildcats, Huddersfield Giants, Leeds Rhinos & Salford Red Devils Super League player; brother of Josh & George
- Josh Griffin (born 1990), Wakefield Trinity Wildcats, Huddersfield Giants, Castleford Tigers, Salford Red Devils & Hull FC Super League player; brother of Darrell & George
- George Griffin (born 1992), Hull KR, London Broncos, Salford Red Devils & Castleford Tigers Super League player; brother of Darrell & Josh

=== Griffiths family ===
- Clive Griffiths (born 1954), Wales international, St Helens & Salford player, father of Owain & Rhys
- Owain Griffiths (born 1991), Wales international, North Wales Crusaders & Whitehaven RLFC player, son of Clive & brother of Rhys
- Rhys Griffiths (born 1987), Wales international player, son of Clive & brother of Owain

=== Grix brothers ===
- Scott Grix (born 1984), Ireland international and Halifax and Warrington player
- Simon Grix (born 1985), Halifax and Warrington player

=== Grothe family ===
- Eric Grothe, Sr. (born 1960), Australian international, New South Wales representative and Parramatta Eels player; father of Eric, Jr.
- Eric Grothe, Jr. (born 1980), Australian international, New South Wales representative and Parramatta/Sydney Roosters/Cronulla player; son of Eric, Sr.

=== Gruppi brothers ===
- Jacques Gruppi (born 1941), France international & Villeneuve-sur-Lot player
- Raymond Gruppi (born 1937), France international & Villeneuve-sur-Lot player

== H ==
=== Haas family ===
- Payne Haas (born 1999), Brisbane Broncos NRL player
- Klese Haas (born 2002), Gold Coast Titans NRL player, younger brother of Payne
- Mark Taufua (born 1981), Newcastle Knights & Cronulla player, uncle of Payne & Klese

=== Hagan brothers ===
- Bob Hagan (born 1940), Australian international, Queensland representative and Canterbury-Bankstown NSWRL player; former Canterbury-Bankstown RLFC chairman
- Michael Hagan (born 1964), Queensland Origin representative, Canterbury-Bankstown and Newcastle Knights NSWRL player, Newcastle NRL premiership coach and Parramatta coach

=== Haggerty family ===
- Roy Haggerty, Great Britain international player; father of Gareth and Kurt
- Gareth Haggerty, Ireland international player; son of Roy, brother of Kurt
- Kurt Haggerty, Ireland international player; son of Roy, brother of Gareth

=== Hale brothers ===
- Jim Hale (1916-1992), South Sydney & St George player, brother of Bill
- Bill Hale (1915-2007), St George player, brother of Jim

=== Hambly family ===
- Brian Hambly (1938–2008), Australian international, New South Wales representative, Wagga Wagga and South Sydney NSWRFL player; cousin of Gary
- Gary Hambly (born 1956), New South Wales representative, Wagga Wagga and South Sydney NSWRFL player; cousin of Brian

=== Hamlin-Uele brothers ===
- Braden Hamlin-Uele, (born 1995), NZ & Samoa international, North Qld Cowboys & Cronulla Sharks player, brother of Caleb
- Caleb Hamlin-Uele, (born 1999), Wakefield Trinity player, brother of Braden

=== Hancock family ===
- Rohan Hancock, (born 1955), Australia international & Queensland player, father of Steph
- Steph Hancock, (born 1982), Australia international, Brisbane Broncos (NRLW), St George Illawarra (NRLW), Gold Coast Titans (NRLW) & Queensland player, daughter of Rohan

=== Hanley family ===
- Ellery Hanley (born 1961), GB & England international, Leeds, Bradford, Balmain, Western Suburbs & Wigan player; father of Umyla
- Umyla Hanley (born 2002), Wigan Warriors Super League player; son of Ellery

=== Hardgrave family ===
- Arthur Hardgrave, New Zealand international 1912–14
- Roy Hardgrave, New Zealand international 1928; son of Arthur

=== Hardy family ===
- Nelson 'Bill' Hardy (1906–1993), Australian international and Eastern Suburbs Roosters player; father of Kevin and Don and grandfather of Steve
- Steve Hardy, Eastern Suburbs Roosters player; grandson of Nelson

=== Harkin family ===
- Kevin Harkin (born 1952), Wakefield Trinity, York Wasps, & Hull FC; cousin of Paul & Terry
- Paul Harkin (born 1958), Bradford Northern, Featherstone Rovers, Hull KR, Leeds, Halifax RLFC & Hunslet; brother of Terry

=== Harris family (1) ===
- Norman Harris (c. 1918–2007), Wales international player; grandfather of Iestyn
- Iestyn Harris (born 1976), Great Britain and dual Welsh rugby international, Warrington, Leeds and Bradford SL player, Salford Reds and Celtic Crusaders coach and Welsh international coach; grandson of Norman

=== Harris family (2) ===
- Billy Harris (born 1951), Featherstone Rovers, Oldham RLFC & Wakefield Trinity; younger brother of Graham
- Graham Harris (born 1946), Featherstone Rovers; older brother of Billy

=== Harrison brothers ===
- Bill Harrison, New Zealand international
- Rata Harrison, New Zealand international

=== Harrison family (1) ===
- James Harrison, (born 1996), England international, Batley Bulldogs, Oxford Rugby League, Featherstone Rovers, Leeds Rhinos & Warrington, son of Karl
- Karl Harrison, (born 1964), Great Britain & England international, Bramley, Featherstone Rovers, Hull FC & Halifax, father of James

=== Harrison family (2) ===
- Ben Harrison (born 1988), England & Ireland international, Warrington Wolves, Widnes Vikings, Swinton Lions, Wakefield Trinity Wildcats & Barrow Raiders player, brother of Liam & nephew of John
- Liam Harrison (born 1983), Ireland international, Barrow Raiders player, brother of Ben & nephew of John
- John Cunningham (born 1952), England international, Barrow, Balmain Tigers, Hull Kingston Rovers & Workington Town player, uncle of Ben & Liam

=== Hastings family ===
- Jackson Hastings, (born 1996) GB international, Sydney Roosters, Manly-Warringah, Wigan Warriors, Salford RLFC, Wests Tigers, Newcastle Knights & St Helens player; son of Kevin
- Kevin Hastings, (born 1957), Sydney Roosters & Barrow player; father of Jackson

=== Hauraki family ===
- Iwi Hauraki, Greek international, Sydney Roosters player; cousin of Weller
- Weller Hauraki, Parramatta Eels player; cousin of Iwi

=== Hayne/Thompson family ===
- Jarryd Hayne (born 1988), Fiji and Australian international, New South Wales representative and Parramatta/Gold Coast Titans NRL player and San Francisco 49ers NFL player; son of Manoa Thompson
- Manoa Thompson (born 1968), Fiji international, South Sydney/Western Suburbs/Auckland Warriors NSWRL player; father of Jarryd Hayne

=== Hayward brothers ===
- Harold Hayward, New Zealand international
- Morgan Hayward, New Zealand international

=== Hayward family ===
- Bailey Hayward, (born 2001), Scotland international, Canterbury Bulldogs player, grandson of Paul
- Paul Hayward, (1954-1992), Newtown Jets player, grandfather of Bailey

=== Healey family ===
- Mitch Healey, (born 1969), Cronulla Sharks & Castleford Tigers player, father of Sam
- Samuel Healey, (born 2002), New Zealand Warriors player, son of Mitch

=== Heidke family ===
- Bill Heidke, Australian international captain and Queensland representative player; brother of Harold and father of Les
- Harold Heidke, Australian international and Queensland representative player; brother of Bill and uncle of Les
- Les "Monty" Heidke, Australian international player; son of Bill and nephew of Harold

=== Hemingway/Slater family ===
- Frank Hemingway, Featherstone Rovers & Wakefield Trinity player, grandfather of Ian
- Ian Slater, Huddersfield, Featherstone Rovers & Bradford Northern player, grandson of Frank

=== Henderson brothers ===
- Andrew Henderson (born 1979), Scotland international, NRL and Super League player
- Kevin Henderson (born 1980), Scotland international, NRL and Super League player
- Ian Henderson (born 1983), Scotland international, NRL and Super League player

=== Henry brothers ===
- Whare Henry, New Zealand international
- Whetu Henry, New Zealand international

=== Hepi family ===
- Brad Hepi, (born 1972), NZ Maori international, father of Tyla
- Tyla Hepi, (born 1993), Hull Kingston Rovers, Gloucestershire All Golds, Whitehaven RLFC, Toulouse Olympique, Castleford Tigers, Featherstone Rovers & Doncaster RLFC, son of Brad

=== Hetherington family ===
- Jason Hetherington (born 1970), Australia international, Queensland, Gold Coast Seagulls, Canterbury& London Broncos; father of Kobe
- Kobe Hetherington (born 1999), Brisbane Broncos; son of Jason

=== Higgins brothers ===
- Alec Higgins, Great Britain international
- Fred Higgins, Great Britain international

=== Higson family ===
- John Higson (1887–1958), Hunslet, Huddersfield, Featherstone Rovers & Wakefield Trinity; father of Len
- Len Higson (1908–1974), England & Yorkshire, Wakefield Trinity, Leeds & Bradford Northern; son of John

=== Hill brothers ===
- Cliff Hill, Great Britain international
- David Hill, Great Britain international

=== Hindmarsh brothers ===
- Ian Hindmarsh (born 1977), Parramatta Eels and Canberra Raiders NRL player
- Nathan Hindmarsh (born 1979) Australian international and Parramatta Eels NRL player

=== Hodges family ===
- Justin Hodges, Australian international, Queensland State of Origin representative and Brisbane Broncos/Sydney Roosters NRL player; cousin of Jayden
- Jayden Hodges, North Queensland and Manly-Warringah NRL player; cousin of Justin

=== Hodgson family ===
- Bailey Hodgson, (born 2002), Castleford Tigers, Newcastle Knights, Manly Sea Eagles & Leigh Leopards player, nephew of Josh
- Josh Hodgson, (born 1989), GB & England international, Hull FC, Hull KR, Canberra Raiders & Parramatta Eels player, uncle of Bailey

=== Hoffman family ===
- Jay Hoffman (born 1958), Queensland representative and Canberra Raiders NSWRL player; father of Ryan
- Ryan Hoffman (born 1984), Australian international and Melbourne Storm NRL player; son of Jay

=== Holliday family ===
- Bill Holliday – Cumbrian forward from the 1960s & '70s for Great Britain and at club level for Whitehaven, Hull Kingston Rovers, Swinton & Rochdale Hornets.
- Les Holliday – forward, son of Bill Holliday, from the 1980s & '90s for Great Britain and at club level for Swinton, Halifax, Widnes and Dewsbury.
- Mike Holliday – forward, son of Bill Holliday, from the 1980s who played at club level for Swinton and Leigh.

=== Holmes family ===
- Harold Holmes, (1894-1954), Western Suburbs Magpies, South Sydney & Eastern Suburbs player, father of Len
- Len Holmes, (1924-1959), Canterbury-Bankstown player, son of Harold

=== Hopoate family ===
- John Hopoate (born 1974), Tongan and Australian international, New South Wales representative and Manly-Warringah/Balmain/Northern Eagles/Wests Tigers NRL player
- Albert Hopoate (born 1985), Sydney Roosters NRL player and brother of John
- William Hopoate (born 1992), New South Wales representative, Manly-Warringah/Parramatta/Canterbury NRL player, son of John and nephew of Albert
- Jamil Hopoate (born 1994), Brisbane Broncos NRL player, son of John and nephew of Albert
- Lehi Hopoate (born 2005), Manly NRL player son of john
- Albert Hopoate (born 2001) NRL Canberra Raiders player son of John

=== Horder family ===
- Clarrie Horder (1890–1960), Queensland representative and South Sydney NSWRFL player
- Harold Horder (1894–1978), Australian international, Queensland representative and South Sydney NSWRFL player
- Bill Horder, NSW, Western Suburbs & Eastern Suburbs, nephew of both Clarrie & Harold

=== Horne brothers ===
- Richard Horne (born 1982), English international and Hull Super League player
- Graeme Horne (born 1985), Hull Super League player

=== Horo brothers ===
- Shane Horo (born 1960), New Zealand international and Leigh Centurions/Castleford Tigers RFL player; brother of Mark and uncle of Justin
- Mark Horo (born 1963), New Zealand international and Parramatta/Western Suburbs/Auckland Warriors player; brother of Shane and father of Justin
- Justin Horo (born 1986), New Zealand Māori representative, Parramatta Eels/Manly-Warringah NRL player and Catalans SL player; son of Mark and nephew of Shane

=== Hosking family ===
- David Hosking, (born 1964), South Sydney Rabbitohs, Manly Sea Eagles & Hull Kingston Rovers player, father of Zac
- Zac Hosking, (born 1997), Brisbane Broncos, Penrith Panthers & Canberra Raiders player, son of David

=== Howard brothers ===
- Daniel Howard, brother of Stephen, USA international
- Stephen Howard, brother of Daniel, USA international

=== Huddart family ===
- Dick Huddart (1936–2021), Great Britain and England international representative (UK club level for Whitehaven and St. Helens) and RFL and NSWRFL player; father of Milton
- Milton Huddart (1960–2015), England international and RFL player; son of Dick

=== Hughes brothers (1) ===
- Adam Hughes (born 1977), Leeds Rhinos, Wakefield Trinity, Halifax, Widnes Vikings, Leigh Centurions, Oldham & Barrow, brother of Ian
- Ian Hughes (born 1972), Sheffield Eagles, Wakefield Trinity, Hull KR, Keighley Cougars, Dewsbury Rams, Gateshead Thunder & Hunslet, brother of Adam

=== Hughes brothers (2) ===
- Carl Hughes (born 1982), York City Knights, Featherstone Rovers, Keighley & Doncaster player, brother of Paul
- Paul Hughes (born 1984), Featherstone Rovers, York City Knights, Dewsbury Rams, Doncaster & Hunslet RLFC player, brother of Carl

=== Hughes/Moore/Folkes family ===
- Garry Hughes (born 1952), Canterbury-Bankstown player and administrator; brother of Graeme and Mark and father of Glen, Steven and Corey. Nephew of Peter Moore and cousin of Kevin Moore.
- Mark Hughes (born 1954), Canterbury-Bankstown player; brother of Graeme and Garry. Nephew of Peter Moore and cousin of Kevin Moore.
- Graeme Hughes (born 1955), New South Wales representative in both cricket and rugby league. Canterbury-Bankstown player; brother of Mark and Garry. Nephew of Peter Moore and cousin of Kevin Moore.
- Glen Hughes (born 1973), Canterbury-Bankstown player; son of Garry, brother of Steven and Corey and second cousin of Kevin Moore.
- Steven Hughes (born 1974), Canterbury-Bankstown player; son of Garry, brother of Glen and Corey and second cousin of Kevin Moore.
- Corey Hughes (born 1978), Canterbury-Bankstown player; son of Garry, brother of Glen and Steven and second cousin of Kevin Moore.
- Peter "Bullfrog" Moore (1932–2001), Canterbury-Bankstown administrator; father of Kevin Moore, uncle of Garry, Mark and Graeme Hughes, great-uncle of Glen, Steven and Corey Hughes.
- Kevin Moore (born 1965) Canterbury-Bankstown player and coach; son of Peter Moore, cousin of Garry, Mark and Graeme Hughes, second cousin of Glen, Steven and Corey Hughes.
- Steve Folkes (born 1959) Canterbury-Bankstown player and coach; son-in-law of Peter Moore.

=== Hulme family ===
- David Hulme, Widnes, Leeds, Salford and Great Britain
- Paul Hulme, Widnes, Warrington, Great Britain, younger brother of David

=== Humphreys family ===
- Jamie Humphreys (born 2002), Manly Sea Eagles & South Sydney Rabbitohs player, son of Stephen & grandson of Kevin
- Kevin Humphreys (1930–2010), NSWRFL player and later chairman; father of Stephen & grandfather of Jamie
- Stephen Humphreys, (born 1960), Balmain Tigers player & CEO of the Wests Tigers; son of Kevin & father of Jamie

== I ==
=== Iro brothers ===
- Tony Iro (born 1967), New Zealand international player, Wigan/Leigh RFL player and Manly-Warringah/Eastern Suburbs/Hunter/Adelaide/South Sydney NRL player and Auckland coach; brother of Kevin
- Kevin Iro (born 1968), New Zealand and Cook Islands international player, Wigan/Leeds/St Helens RFL player and Manly-Warringah/Hunter/Auckland NRL player; brother of Tony
- Kayal Iro (born 2000), Cook Islands international player, New Zealand Warriors NRL player, son of Kevin and nephew of Tony

=== Ives brothers ===
- Clarrie Ives (1890–1956), Australian international, New South Wales representative and NSWRFL player
- Bill Ives (1896–1975), New South Wales representative and NSWRFL player

=== Izzard brothers ===
- Brad Izzard (born 1965), New South Wales State of Origin and Penrith Panthers NSWRL player
- Craig Izzard, Penrith Panthers and Illawarra Steelers NSWRL player
- Grant Izzard, Penrith Panthers and Illawarra Steelers NSWRL player

== J ==
=== Jacks brothers ===
- Rhys Jacks, (born 1990), Canada international, Souths Logan Magpies, Sheffield Eagles, Toronto Wolfpack, Sunshine Coast Falcons & Easts Tigers player
- Ryley Jacks, (born 1992), Canada international, Melbourne Storm, Gold Coast Titans, Featherstone Rovers & Brisbane Tigers player

=== James brothers ===
- Evan James, (1869-1901), Broughton Rangers player
- David James, (1866-1929), Broughton Rangers player

=== Jennings brothers ===
- George Jennings (born 1993), Penrith/Parramatta NRL player
- Michael Jennings (born 1988), Tongan and Australian international, New South Wales Origin representative, Penrith/Sydney Roosters/Parramatta NRL player
- Robert Jennings (born 1996), Penrith/South Sydney NRL player

=== Joass family ===
- Bill Joass, (1909-1983), Canterbury-Bankstown player, son of Rangi
- Rangi Joass, (1889-1964), Western Suburbs Magpies player, father of Bill

=== Johns family ===
- Matthew Johns (born 1971), Australian international; New South Wales Origin representative; Newcastle/Cronulla-Sutherland NRL player and Wigan SL player, brother of Andrew and father of Jack and Cooper
- Andrew Johns (born 1974), Australian international; New South Wales Origin representative; Newcastle Knights player. 8th Rugby League Immortal, brother of Matthew and uncle of Jack
- Jack Johns (born 1997), Italian international, son of Matthew and nephew of Andrew
- Cooper Johns (born 1999), Son of Matthew and nephew of Andrew. Former Melbourne Storm playmaker

=== Jones family ===
- Stacey Jones, (born 1976), New Zealand & Maori international, Auckland City, Auckland Warriors, Catalans Dragons & New Zealand Warriors player, uncle of Laishon
- Laishon Albert-Jones, (born 1997), New Zealand international, Newcastle Knights & New Zealand Warriors player, niece of Stacey

=== Jordan family ===
- Len Jordan, New Zealand international 1946–9
- Chris Jordan, New Zealand international 1977–8; son of Len

=== Junee family ===
- Kevin Junee, Australian international, New South Wales representative and Eastern Suburbs/Manly-Warringah NSWRFL player; father of Darren
- Darren Junee, Eastern Suburbs NSWRL player and son of Kevin

== K ==
=== Karalius brothers ===
- Vince Karalius (1932–2008), British international and St Helens and Widnes player
- Tony Karalius, St Helens and Widnes player

=== Karpani sisters ===
- Asoiva Karpani (born 1996), St George player, sister of Simone
- Simone Karpani (born 1997), Newcastle Knights player, sister of Asoiva

=== Katoa brothers (1) ===
- Sione Katoa (born 1997) NRL Cronulla Sharks player
- Tui Katoa (born 1999) NSW Burleigh Bears player

=== Katoa brothers (2) ===
- Sione Katoa (born 1995) NRL Penrith Panthers & Canterbury Bulldogs player
- Isaiya Katoa (born 2004) NRL Dolphins player

=== Kaufusi brothers ===
- Antonio Kaufusi, Melbourne Storm, North Queensland Cowboys, Newcastle Knights, London Broncos, Huddersfield Giants, Bradford Bulls and Canterbury-Bankstown Bulldogs player
- Felise Kaufusi, Melbourne Storm player
- Patrick Kaufusi, North Queensland Cowboys player

=== Keating brothers ===
- Kris Keating (born 1988), Parramatta Eels, Canterbury & Hull KR; brother of Matthew
- Matt Keating (born 1986), Parramatta Eels; brother of Kris

=== Keato brothers ===
- Bill Keato, Western Suburbs NSWRFL player
- Alan Keato, Western Suburbs NSWRFL player

=== Keinhorst brothers ===
- Kristian Keinhorst, Germany international, brother of Jimmy
- Jimmy Keinhorst, Germany international, Leeds Rhinos, Hunslet Hawks, Wakefield Trinity Wildcats, Widnes Vikings, Hull Kingston Rovers, York City Knights, Castleford Tigers & Keighley Cougars player, brother of Kristian

=== Kellett family ===
- Brian Kellett (born 1959), Featherstone Rovers & Mansfield Marksman; son of Cyril
- Cyril Kellett (1937–1993), Hull KR & Featherstone Rovers; father of Brian

=== Kelly brothers ===
- Andy Kelly, Wakefield Trinity player and coach, and Dewsbury and Featherstone Rovers coach
- Neil Kelly (born 1962), Wakefield Trinity, Dewsbury, Hunslet and Featherstone Rovers player
- Richard Kelly, Wakefield Trinity and Dewsbury player

=== Kennedy family ===
- Kandy Kennedy, (born 1996), Sydney Roosters player, daughter of William Sr & sister of William Jr
- William Kennedy Jr, (born 1997), Cronulla Sharks player, son of William & brother of Kandy
- William Kennedy Sr, (born 1969), Balmain Tigers player, father of William & Kandy

=== Kimmorley brothers ===
- Craig Kimmorley (born 1974), Newcastle Knights, Adelaide Rams and Sydney City Roosters NRL player
- Brett Kimmorley (born 1976), Australian international, New South Wales Origin representative and Newcastle Knights/Hunter Mariners/Melbourne Storm/Northern Eagles/Cronulla Sharks/Canterbury-Bankstown NRL player

=== Khedimi family ===
- Mathieu Khedimi (1964-2023), France international & AS Saint-Estève player, father of Matthieu
- Matthieu Khedimi (born 1997), France international, AS Saint-Estève, Catalans Dragons & AS Carcassonne player, son of Mathieu

=== King family (1) ===
- John King, Penrith NSWRFL player; father of Cameron
- Cameron King, St. George Illawarra Dragons NRL player; son of John

=== King family (2) ===
- Johnny King, St. George Dragons NSWRFL player; son of Cec, father of David
- Max King, Gold Coast Titans, Melbourne Storm player; son of David, grandson of Johnny, great-grandson of Cec

=== King family (3) ===
- Andrew King (born 1975), Gold Coast Chargers, Manly Sea Eagles, Northern Eagles & South Sydney player; father of Ethan and brother of Chris & Matt
- Chris King (born 1969), Parramatta Eels player; uncle of Ethan and brother of Andrew & Matt
- Ethan King, (born 2002), Sydney Roosters player, son of Andrew, nephew of Chris & Matt
- Matt King (born 1980), Melbourne Storm, Warrington Wolves & South Sydney Rabbitohs player; uncle of Ethan and brother of Chris & Andrew

=== Klein family ===
- Ashley Klein, Super League & NRL referee, son of John
- John Klein (born 1952), Penrith Panthers player, father of Ashley

=== Kirwan family ===
- Jack Kirwan, Auckland and New Zealand representative player; grandfather of John
- John Kirwan, Auckland Warriors player; grandson of Jack

=== Knight/Richards/Powell family ===
- Stephen Knight, (born 1948), Western Suburbs, Balmain & Manly-Warringah player, nephew of Jim & cousin of Richie
- Richie Powell, (1939-2019), South Sydney player, cousin of Stephen, and nephew of Jim
- Jim Richards, (1928-2007), South Sydney & Newtown player, uncle of Stephen & Richie

=== Krewanty family ===
- Alex Krewanty, brother of Arnold and Julius, PNG International
- Arnold Krewanty, brother of Alex and Julius, PNG International

== L ==
=== Laforgue brothers ===
- Francis Laforgue (born 1958), France international & XIII Catalan player, twin brother of Guy
- Guy Laforgue (born 1958), France international, XIII Catalan, Le Barcarès XIII & Palau XIII player, twin brother of Francis

=== Laguerre brothers ===
- Benjamin Laguerre (born 2001), Toulouse Olympique player, brother of Matthieu
- Matthieu Laguerre (born 1999), France international, Catalans Dragons & Toulouse Olympique player, brother of Benjamin

=== Lahrs family ===
- Kaiden Lahrs, (born 2006), North Queensland Cowboys player, son of Tom
- Tom Learoyd-Lahrs, (born 1985), Australia international, Brisbane Broncos, Canberra Raiders & Melbourne Storm player, father of Kaiden

=== Laing brothers ===
- Bert Laing, (1893-1963), New Zealand international
- Albert Laing, (1908-1962), New Zealand international

=== Laing family ===
- Aseri Laing, (born 1975), Fiji international, Western Suburbs Magpies & Melbourne Storm player, father of Teaghan
- Teaghan Hartigan, (born 1995), Fiji international & New Zealand Warriors player, daughter of Aseri

=== Lam family ===
- Adrian Lam, (born (1970), PNG international, Sydney Roosters & Wigan Warriors player, father of Lachlan
- Lachlan Lam, (born 1998), PNG international, Sydney Roosters & Leigh Leopards player, son of Adrian

=== Lane brothers ===
- Brett Lane, Canterbury-Bankstown Bulldogs NRL player
- Shaun Lane, Canterbury-Bankstown/New Zealand Warriors/Manly-Warringah/Parramatta NRL player

=== Lang family ===
- John Lang (born 1950), Australian international and Queensland representative player, Cronulla, Penrith and South Sydney coach; father of Martin
- Martin Lang (born 1975), Queensland representative player; played his whole club career under the coaching of his father, John

=== Lauaki / Vaikona family ===
- Epalahame Lauaki, (born 1984), New Zealand, Exiles & Tonga international, New Zealand Warriors, Hull F.C., Wigan Warriors & Bradford Bulls player, cousin of Tevita
- Tevita Vaikona, (born 1974), Tonga international, Hull FC & Bradford Bulls player, cousin of Epalahame

=== Laulu-Togaga'e family ===
- Quentin Laulu-Togaga'e (born 1984), Samoa international, Sheffield Eagles, Toronto Wolfpack, Halifax, Castleford Tigers, Newcastle Thunder & Keighley Cougars player; father of Phoenix
- Phoenix Laulu-Togaga'e (born 2003), Keighley Cougars, Hull KR & Oldham player; son of Quentin

=== Laurie brothers ===
- Robert "Rocky" Laurie, Eastern Suburbs NSWRL player
- Mark Laurie, Parramatta NSWRL player

=== Law brothers ===
- Graham Law, Wakefield Trinity Wildcats player
- Neil Law, Northampton Saints (RU), Sheffield Eagles, and Wakefield Trinity Wildcats player

=== Lawton brothers ===
- Karl Lawton (born 1995), Gold Coast Titans, NZ Warriors, Manly, Nth Qld Cowboys, younger brother of Kayne
- Kayne Lawton (born 1989), Gold Coast Titans, Carcassonne, older brother of Karl

=== Laybutt brothers ===
- Kyle Laybutt (born 1995), Nth Qld Cowboys, brother of Zac
- Zac Laybutt (born 2002), Nth Qld Cowboys, brother of Kyle

=== Lazarus family ===
- Glenn Lazarus (born 1965), Australian international, New South Wales representative and Canberra Raiders, Brisbane Broncos and Melbourne Storm NRL player; uncle of Blake
- Blake Lazarus (born 1988), Wests Tigers NRL player; nephew of Glenn

=== Lester brothers ===
- Aaron Lester, Auckland Warriors and Whitehaven player
- Stuart Lester, Wigan Warriors player

=== Leuluai family ===
James and Phillip's parents were born in Samoa, though the family is now settled in South Auckland. James and Thomas's combined total of 58 Tests (as of November 2011) is thought to be a world record for a father and son combination.

- James Leuluai (born 1957), New Zealand international player, brother of Phillip, father of Thomas and Macgraff, uncle of Kylie
- Phillip Leuluai (born 1977), Samoa international player, brother of James, uncle of Thomas, Macgraff, and Kylie
- Kylie Leuluai (born 1978), New Zealand Māori representative, Samoa international player, nephew of James and Phillip, cousin of Thomas and Macgraff
- Thomas Leuluai (born 1985), New Zealand international player, Wigan Warriors player, son of James, nephew of Phillip, brother of Macgraff, cousin of Kylie
- Macgraff Leuluai (born 1990), Widnes Vikings player, son of James, nephew of Phillip, brother of Thomas, cousin of Kylie

=== Leyland brothers ===
- Oliver Leyland, (born 2001), London Broncos, London Skolars & Warrington Wolves player, brother of Bill
- Bill Leyland, (born 2003), London Broncos, Hull KR & Huddersfield Giants player, brother of Oli

=== Lindwall brothers ===
- Ray Lindwall (1921–1996), St. George NSWRFL player
- Jack Lindwall, St. George NSWRFL player

=== Litten brothers ===
- Davy Litten, (born 2003), Hull FC, Whitehaven & York Knights player
- Jez Litten, (born 1998), Hull FC, Doncaster, Hull KR player

=== Lomax brothers ===
- John Lomax, (born 1966), New Zealand international, Wainuiomata Lions, Canberra Raiders, North Queensland Cowboys & Melbourne Storm player, brother of David & uncle of Willie
- David Lomax, (born 1970), New Zealand international, Wainuiomata Lions, Canberra Raiders, Western Reds, Paris Saint-Germain, Newcastle Knights & Huddersfield-Sheffield player, brother of John & uncle of Willie
- Willie Raston, (born 1984), Canberra Raiders player, nephew of David & John

=== Lord brothers ===
- Gary Lord, (born 1966), Castleford, Leeds, Halifax, Oldham Bears, Wakefield Trinity, Batley Bulldogs, Hunslet Hawks, Keighley Cougars & Featherstone Rovers player, brother of Paul
- Paul Lord, (born 1967), Oldham, Doncaster RLFC, Wakefield Trinity & Swinton player, brother of Gary

=== Lousi brothers ===
- Sam Lousi, brother of Sione, New Zealand Warriors player
- Sione Lousi, brother of Sam, New Zealand Warriors player

=== Lowe brothers ===
- Ben Lowe (born 1985), South Sydney Rabbitohs; brother of Jaiman
- Jaiman Lowe (born 1983), N Queensland Cowboys, South Sydney Rabbitohs & Melbourne Storm; brother of Ben

=== Lulia brothers ===
- Keith Lulia, brother of Lulia, Cook Islands international
- Lulia Lulia, brother of Keith, Cook Islands international

=== Lumsden brothers ===
- Eddie Lumsden (born 1936), Australian international and New South Wales representative, Manly-Warringah and St George NSWRFL player
- Jack Lumsden (born 1931), Australian international representative and Manly-Warringah NSWRFL player

=== Lussick brothers ===
- Darcy Lussick, (born 1989), Manly Sea Eagles, Parramatta Eels, Toronto Wolfpack, Salford Red Devils & Featherstone Rovers player
- Freddy Lussick, (born 2000), Sydney Roosters, St. George Illawarra & New Zealand Warriors player
- Joey Lussick, (born 1995), Manly Sea Eagles, Salford Red Devils, Parramatta Eels & St Helens player

== M ==
=== MacDougall brothers ===
- Gil MacDougall, Balmain Tigers and Western Suburbs Magpies NSWRFL player and father of Adam, Ben, Scott, and Luke
- Adam MacDougall (born 1975), Australian international and Sydney Roosters, Newcastle Knights and South Sydney Rabbitohs NRL player
- Ben MacDougall (born 1977), Manly-Warringah Sea Eagles, Melbourne Storm, Newcastle Knights NRL player
- Luke MacDougall (born 1982), Newcastle Knights and South Sydney Rabbitohs NRL player
- Graeme MacDougall (born 1940) St George, Australian Wallabies (1961–62), Balmain Tigers
- Stuart MacDougall (born 1947) St George, Australian Wallabies (1973–76)

=== Maddison brothers ===
- Ken Maddison (born 1946), Australian international and St. George/Cronulla NSWRFL player
- Keith Maddison, St. George NSWRFL player

=== Malone/Renouf family ===
- Steve Renouf (born 1970), Australian international and Queensland Origin representative. Brisbane Broncos NRL and Wigan SL player; uncle of Donald
- Donald Malone (born 1985), North Queensland Cowboys NRL player; nephew of Steve

=== Maloney family ===
- Dominic Maloney, (born 1987), Castleford Tigers, Dewsbury Rams, Hull F.C., Halifax, Featherstone Rovers & Hemel Stags player, nephew of Francis
- Francis Maloney, (born 1973), England international, Leeds, Featherstone Rovers, Warrington, Oldham Bears, Castleford Tigers, Wakefield Trinity Wildcats, Salford City Reds, Dewsbury Rams, Batley Bulldogs & Hunslet Hawks player, uncle of Dominic

=== Mann family ===
- Don Mann, New Zealand international player; father of Duane and Don Jr
- Duane Mann (born 1965), New Zealand & Tongan international player, Warrington RLFC player; son of Don
- Esau Mann, Tonga international player
- George Mann, New Zealand & Tongan international; cousin of Duane

=== Mannah brothers ===
- Jon Mannah (1989–2013) Cronulla-Sutherland Sharks NRL player
- Tim Mannah (born 1988) Parramatta Eels NRL player

=== Mara family ===
- Bob Mara, Balmain NSWRFL player; father of Gary
- Gary Mara (1962–2012), Balmain NSWRL player; son of Bob
- Les Mara (1975–82), NSWRFL player for Balmain, South Sydney, Newtown; City NSW; New South Wales; Rugby Football League Championship player for St Helens RFC; nephew of Bob Mara

=== Maranta family ===
- Barry Maranta, co-founder of the Brisbane Broncos
- Lachlan Maranta, Brisbane Broncos NRL player – Father is Brett Plowman, Brisbane Broncos Player

=== March twins ===
- David March (born 1979), Wakefield Trinity and York player
- Paul March (born 1979), Wakefield Trinity and York player

=== Maria brothers ===
- Antoni Maria, (born 1987), France international, Saint-Gaudens Bears, Toulouse Olympique, Saint-Esteve, Catalans Dragons, Leigh Centurions, Hull KR & FC Lezignan player, brother of Franck
- Franck Maria, (born 1997), France international, Saint-Esteve, Villeneuve Leopards, FC Lezignan & Catalans Dragons player, brother of Antoni

=== Marschke twins ===
- Ben Marschke, (born 1997), North Sydney Bears NSW & Sydney Roosters player
- Jesse Marschke, (born 1997), North Sydney Bears NSW & St George Illawarra Dragons player

=== Marshall brothers ===
- Benji Marshall, (born 1985), NZ international, Wests Tigers, St. George Illawarra, Brisbane Broncos & South Sydney player, brother of Jeremy
- Jeremy Marshall-King, (born 1995), NZ international, Wests Tigers, Canterbury Bulldogs & Dolphins player, brother of Benji

=== Martyn family ===
- Mick Martyn, Great Britain international, older brother of Thomas Martyn, and uncle of Tommy Martyn
- Thomas Martyn, England international, younger brother of Mick Martyn, and father of Tommy Martyn
- Tommy Martyn, Ireland international, son of Thomas Martyn, and nephew of Mick Martyn, father of Shay Martyn
- Shay Martyn, St Helens player, son of Tommy Martyn, grandson of Thomas Martyn

=== Mason family ===
- Keith Mason, (born 1982), Wales international, Wakefield Trinity Wildcats, Melbourne Storm, St Helens, Castleford Tigers & Huddersfield Giants player, father of Lukas
- Lukas Mason, (born 2005), Wigan Warriors, London Broncos, Oldham RLFC, Rochdale Hornets & Salford RLFC player, son of Keith

=== Matagi family ===
- Chris Matagi (born 2007), St Helens & Cronulla Sharks player, son of Suaia
- Suaia Matagi, (born 1988), NZ & Samoa international, New Zealand Warriors, Sydney Roosters, Penrith Panthers, Parramatta Eels, Huddersfield Giants, Castleford Tigers, Halifax Panthers & Doncaster player, father of Chris

=== Mata'utia brothers ===
- Peter Mata'utia (born 1990), Samoan international, Newcastle Knights, St. George Illawarra, Leigh, and Castleford player
- Chanel Mata'utia (born 1992), Newcastle Knights player
- Pat Mata'utia (born 1993), Newcastle Knights player
- Sione Mata'utia (born 1996), Australian and Samoan international, Newcastle Knights and St. Helens player

A cousin, Masada Iosefa (1988–2021), was a Samoan international who played for Penrith and the Wests Tigers.

=== Matterson brothers ===
- Frank Matterson, (1904-1980), Western Suburbs player
- Neil Matterson, (1899-1971), Western Suburbs player

=== Matterson family ===
- Dean Matterson, (born 1997), Manly Sea Eagles player, brother of Ryan, nephew of Terry
- Ryan Matterson, (born 1994), Sydney Roosters, Wests Tigers & Parramatta Eels player, brother of Dean, nephew of Terry
- Terry Matterson, (born 1967), Eastern Suburbs, Brisbane Broncos & London Broncos player, uncle of Dean & Ryan

=== May brothers ===
- Tyrone May (born 1996), Samoan international, Penrith Panthers, Catalans Dragons & Hull KR player
- Taylan May (born 2001), Penrith Panthers player
- Terrell May (born 1999), Sydney Roosters Senior Representative player

=== McCarthy family ===
- Bob McCarthy, Australian international and South Sydney NSWRFL player
- Darren McCarthy, Canterbury-Bankstown NSWRL player
- Troy McCarthy, Gold Coast Chargers NSWRL Player

=== McClennan family ===
- Mike McClennan, New Zealand-born St. Helens RFL coach; father of Brian
- Brian McClennan, New Zealand-born Leeds Super League coach; son of Mike

=== McCormack brothers ===
- Eric McCormack, (1905-1997), St George Dragons player
- Jack McCormack, (1904-1996), St George Dragons, South Sydney & Canterbury Bankstown player

=== McCracken family ===
- Ken McCracken, New Zealand international player and father of Jarrod
- Jarrod McCracken (born 1970), New Zealand international; Canterbury-Bankstown Bulldogs, Parramatta Eels and Wests Tigers player; and son of Ken

=== McCue brothers ===
- Jim McCue, (1889-1971), Newtown player
- Paddy McCue, (1883-1962), Australia international, Newtown & Western Suburbs player

=== McGahan family ===
- Hugh McGahan, (born 1961), NZ & Maori international, Otahuhu & Eastern Suburbs player, father of Matt
- Matt McGahan, (born 1993), Melbourne Storm U20s player, son of Hugh

=== McGregor family ===
- Dick McGregor, All Black international
- Dougie McGregor, All Black and Kiwis international

=== McGuinness brothers ===
- Ken McGuinness (born 1975), New South Wales Origin representative, Western Suburbs/Wests Tigers/North Queensland NRL player
- Kevin McGuinness (born 1976), Western Suburbs/Wests Tigers/Manly Warringah NRL player and Salford SL player

=== 1st McKinnon family ===
- Harry McKinnon, North Sydney NSWRFL player, coach and administrator; brother of Don, Sr. and father of Doug and Max and Don, Jr
- Don McKinnon (born 1955), Australian international and North Sydney/Manly Warringah NSRWFL player; Son of Harry, nephew of Don, Sr. and brother of Doug and Max

=== 2nd McKinnon family ===
- Ross McKinnon, Australian international and NSWRFL player; grandfather of Wade
- Wade McKinnon (born 1981), NRL player and grandson of Ross

=== McLean family (1) ===
- Willie McLean (born 1973), North Sydney Bears, father of Jesse & Casey
- Jesse McLean (born 2005) Penrith Panthers NRL player
- Casey McLean (born 2006) Penrith Panthers NRL player
- Alex Chan (born 1974), Parramatta Eels, Melbourne Storm & Catalans, brother-in-law of Willie

=== McLean family (2) ===
- Michael McLean, Manly-Warringah & North Sydney player, son of Peter
- Peter McLean, (1925-1986), Western Suburbs player, father of Michael

=== McNamara family ===
- Ben McNamara (born 2001), Hull FC & Leigh Leopards player, son of Steve
- Steve McNamara (born 1971), GB & England international, Hull FC, Bradford Bulls, Wakefield Trinity & Huddersfield Giants player, father of Ben

=== McRitchie family ===
- Doug McRitchie, Australian international, New South Wales interstate, and St. George NSWRFL player; brother of Bill
- Bill McRitchie, St. George NSWRFL player; brother of Doug
- Alan McRitchie, St. George NSWRFL player, son of Bill

=== Mead family ===
- Les Mead, (1909-1996), Australia international, Western Suburbs Magpies & Wauchope player, son of Ted
- Ted Mead, (1882-1951), Western Suburbs Magpies player, father of Les

=== Meaney family ===
- Denis Meaney, (1936-2011), Manly-Warringah & Western Suburbs player, grandfather of Nick
- Nick Meaney, (born 1997), Newcastle Knights, Canterbury Bulldogs & Melbourne Storm player, grandson of Denis

=== Mellars family ===
- Peter Mellars, New Zealand international Petone Panthers plus Central districts prop and father of Vince
- Vince Mellars, NRL Warriors Sharks and Roosters centre and Super League Crusaders, son of Peter

=== Messenger brothers ===
- Dally Messenger (1889–1959), Australian international and Eastern Suburbs NSWRFL player
- Wally Messenger (1891–1961), Australian international and Eastern Suburbs NSWRFL player

=== Metcalfe family ===
- Donald Metcalfe, (1932-2006), Featherstone Rovers & Wakefield Trinity player, grandson of James Metcalfe & Ernest Bennett, nephew of Stan Smith, great-grandson of Tom
- James Metcalfe, (1873-1943), Wakefield Trinity player, grandfather of Donald
- Ernest Bennett, (1879-1921), Wakefield Trinity player, grandfather of Donald
- Tom Bennett, (1852-1905), Wakefield Trinity player, father of Ernest & great-grandfather of Donald
- Stan Smith, (1910-1978), GB & England international, Wakefield Trinity & Leeds RLFC player, uncle of Donald

=== Millard family ===
- Shane Millard, father of Ryan & Daryl
- Ryan Millard, brother of Daryl, Fijian international
- Daryl Millard, brother of Ryan, Fijian international

=== Miller family ===
- Arthur Miller-Stephen, (born 2003), Parramatta Eels player, nephew of Marshall
- Marshall Miller, North Queensland Cowboys player, uncle of Arthur

=== Mills family ===
- 'Big Jim' Mills, Great Britain and Wales international, and Widnes RFL player; father of David
- David Mills, Wales international and Widnes Super League player; son of Jim

=== Mincham family ===
- Ted Mincham, New Zealand international 1935–6
- Bob Mincham, New Zealand international 1966–8; son of Ted

=== Minichiello brothers ===
- Anthony Minichiello (born 1980), Australian and Italian international, New South Wales representative and Sydney Roosters NRL player
- Mark Minichiello (born 1982), Italian international, Sydney Roosters, South Sydney, Gold Coast Titans NRL & Hull FC player

=== Minto family ===
- Matt Minto, Newcastle Knights player; nephew of Scott
- Scott Minto, Brisbane Broncos and North Queensland Cowboys player; uncle of Matt

=== Mitchell brothers (1) ===
- Alf Mitchell, New Zealand international
- George Mitchell, New Zealand international

=== Mitchell brothers (2) ===
- Latrell Mitchell (born 1997) South Sydney Rabbitohs NRL player
- Shaquai Mitchell (born 1996) South Sydney Rabbitohs NRL player

=== Molo family ===
- Anthony Milford (born 1994), Samoa international & Canberra, Brisbane, Newcastle Knights & Dolphins player; cousin of both Michael & Francis
- Francis Molo (born 1994), Cook Islands & Samoa international & Brisbane, North Queensland Cowboys & St George Illawarra player; brother of Michael & cousin of Anthony
- Michael Molo (born 1997), St George Illawarra player; brother of Francis & cousin of Anthony

=== Monaghan brothers ===
- Michael Monaghan (born 1980), Canberra Raiders & Manly Sea Eagles NRL player, and Warrington Wolves Super League player
- Joel Monaghan (born 1982), Australian international, New South Wales Origin representative, Canberra Raiders & Sydney Roosters NRL player, and Warrington Wolves & Castleford Tigers Super League player

=== Morley brothers ===
- Adrian Morley (born 1977), GB & England, Leeds Rhinos, Sydney Roosters, Warrington Wolves & Salford; brother of Chris
- Chris Morley (born 1973), St Helens, Warrington Wolves, Salford, Sheffield Eagles, Oldham RLFC, Halifax RLFC & Swinton; brother of Adrian

=== Morris family (1) ===
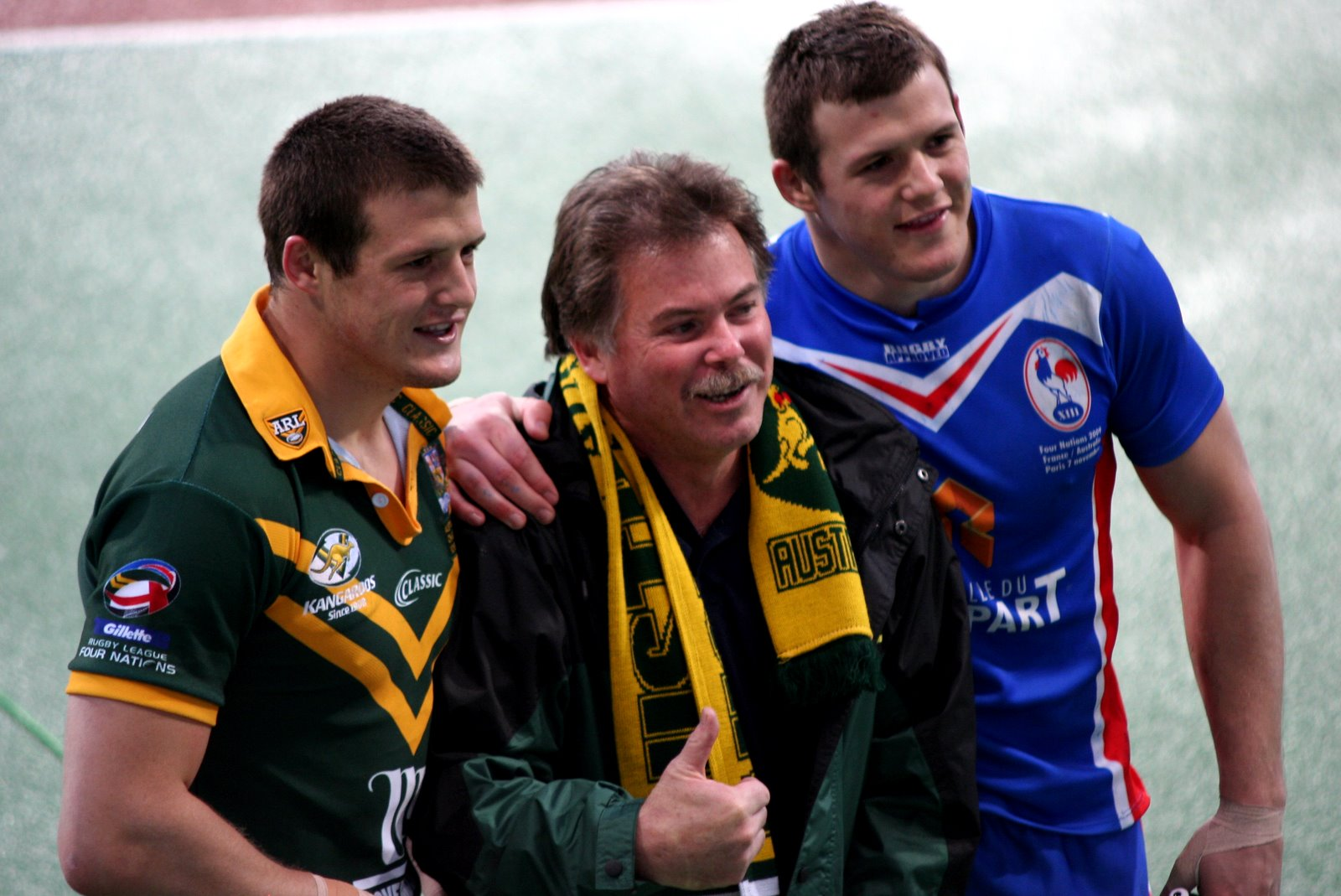
The Morris family in 2009 after Josh and Brett had represented Australia together

- Steve Morris (born 1957) Australian international, New South Wales representative, and St. George/Eastern Suburbs NSWRFL player; father of twins Brett and Josh.
- Brett Morris (born 1986) Australian international, New South Wales representative, and St. George Illawarra/Canterbury-Bankstown/Sydney NRL player
- Josh Morris (born 1986) Australian international, New South Wales representative, and St. George Illawarra/Canterbury-Bankstown/Cronulla-Sutherland/Sydney NRL player

=== Morris family (2) ===
- Des Morris, (born 1948), Eastern Suburbs & Wynnum-Manly Seagulls player, brother of Rod
- Rod Morris, (born 1950), Australia international, Easts (Brisbane), Balmain Tigers & Wynnum Manly Seagulls player, brother of Des

=== Mortimer family ===
- Mortimer brothers
  - Steve Mortimer (born 1956), Australian international, New South Wales representative and Canterbury-Bankstown NSWRL player; brother of Peter, Chris and Glen, and uncle of Daniel
  - Peter Mortimer (born 1957), New South Wales representative and Canterbury-Bankstown NSWRL player; brother of Steve, Chris and Glen, and father of Daniel
  - Chris Mortimer (born 1958), Australian international, New South Wales representative and Canterbury-Bankstown NSWRL player; brother of Steve, Peter and Glen, and uncle of Daniel
  - Glen Mortimer, Cronulla-Sutherland NSWRL player; brother of Steve, Peter and Chris, and uncle of Daniel
- Daniel Mortimer (born 1989), Sydney Roosters NRL player; son of Peter, nephew of Steve, Chris and Glen.

=== Mosby family ===
- Hagiga Mosby, (born 2000), Brisbane Broncos player, niece of Gideon
- Gideon Gela-Mosby, (born 1996), Nth Queensland Cowboys player, uncle of Hagiga

=== Moses brothers (1) ===
- Dai Moses – forward in the 1940s, 1950s and 1960s for Wales and at club level for Salford and Swinton.
- Glyn Moses – full back in the 1940s and 1950s for Great Britain and at club level for Salford and St. Helens

=== Moses brothers (2) ===
- Bob Moses, (1940-2017), South Sydney Rabbitohs & Manly-Warringah Sea Eagles player
- Ron Moses, Balmain player

=== Mountford brothers ===
- Cecil Mountford (1919–2009), International representative and Wigan RFL player
- Bill Mountford, New Zealand representative player
- Ken Mountford, New Zealand representative player

=== Mueller brothers ===
- Blake Mueller – Newcastle NRL player
- Brock Mueller – Newcastle NRL player

=== Mulitalo brothers ===
- Lorenzo Mulitalo, (born 1999), Parramatta Eels player, twin brother of Ronaldo
- Ronaldo Mulitalo, (born 1999), NZ, Samoa & US international, Cronulla Sharks player, twin brother of Lorenzo

=== Mullane family ===
- Mick Mullane Sr., New South Wales representative and Newtown Jets player; father of Mick Jr and Greg
- Greg Mullane, Canterbury and Cronulla player; Brother of Mick Jr
- Mick Mullane Jr., Cronulla player; Brother of Greg and father of Jye
- Jye Mullane, Cronulla and Manly player; Son of Mick Jr

=== Mullins family ===
- Bill Mullins, New South Wales representative and Eastern Suburbs Roosters NSWRFL player; brother of Russell and Terry, and father of Brett
- Russell Mullins, Western Suburbs & Penrith NSWRFL player; brother of Bill and Terry, and uncle of Brett
- Brett Mullins (born 1972), Australian international, New South Wales representative and Canberra Raiders and Sydney Roosters NRL player; son of Bill and nephew of Russell and Terry
- Jack Hetherington (born 1996), Penrith Panthers, Canterbury Bulldogs & Newcastle Knights NRL player, grandson of Bill
- James Schiller, (born 2001), Canberra Raiders & Newcastle Knights NRL player, grandson of Bill

=== Mundine family ===
- Anthony Mundine (born 1975), Boxer, New South Wales State of Origin and St. George Illawarra NRL player; cousin of Beau
- Beau Mundine (born 1980), South Sydney NRL player; uncle of Anthony
- Tony Mundine (born 1951), boxer and Father of Anthony
- Wes Patten (born 1974), Balmain, Gold Coast, South Sydney and St George Illawarra NRL player; cousin of Anthony, Amos and Robbie
- Robbie Simpson Rugby league player with St. George, and cousin of Anthony, Robbie and Wes
- Rod Silva (born 1967), Eastern Suburbs and Canterbury Bulldogs player; Uncle of all of the above
- Buddy Gordon (born 1987), South Sydney, Canterbury and Penrith NRL player; Cousin of all of the above
- Amos Roberts, uncle of Anthony
- James Roberts, cousin of Anthony
- Tyran Smith, brother-in-law of Anthony

=== Murrell family ===
- Bryan Murrell, (born 1955), Leeds & Hunslet player, father of Scott
- Scott Murrell, (born 1985), Leeds Rhinos, London Broncos, Hull Kingston Rovers, Halifax, Keighley Cougars & Midlands Hurricanes player, son of Bryan

=== Myler family ===
- Frank Myler, Great Britain international, Widnes and St Helens RFL player, and Widnes RFL coach
- Tony Myler, Great Britain international, Widnes RFL and Balmain NSWRL player, and Widnes RFL coach; uncle of Stephen
- Stephen Myler (born 1984), St Helens, Widnes Vikings and Salford City Reds Super League player; nephew of Tony

== N ==
=== Nable brothers ===
- Adam Nable (born 1975), Manly-Warringah, Balmain, Wests Tigers and North Queensland NRL player, Wakefield Trinity SL player.
- Matt Nable (born 1972), Manly-Warringah and South Sydney NSWRL player, Carlisle and London Broncos player. Actor.

=== Naiqama brothers ===
- Kevin Naiqama, Fijian international, Newcastle Knights and Wests Tigers player
- Wes Naiqama, Fijian international, St George-Illawarra Dragons Newcastle Knights player

=== Nakubuwai family ===
- Ben Nakubuwai (born 1996), Gold Coast Titans, Salford Red Devils, Leigh Leopards & Featherstone Rovers, son of Pio
- Pio Nakubuwai, Fiji international, father of Ben

=== Narvo family ===
- Herb Narvo, Australian international representative, and Newtown and St. George NSWRFL player; father of Frank
- Frank Narvo, Newtown and St. George NSWRFL player; son of Herb

=== Naughton brothers ===
- Albert Naughton, Great Britain representative and Widnes RFL player
- Danny Naughton, Great Britain representative and Widnes RFL player

=== Navale family ===
- Caleb Navale, (born 2003), Fiji international & Manly Sea Eagles player, son of Eparama
- Eparama Navale, (born 1975), Fiji international, Parramatta Eels & Northern Eagles player, father of Caleb

=== Neil brothers ===
- Alan Neil, (born 1957), Western Suburbs, Eastern Suburbs & St. George Dragons player
- Mick Neil, (born 1964), Western Suburbs, Balmain Tigers & Illawarra Steelers player

=== Newlove family ===
- John Newlove, England international, Featherstone Rovers and Hull FC player; father of Paul, Richard & Shaun
- Paul Newlove, Featherstone Rovers, Bradford, Saint Helens, Castleford Tigers, Great Britain & Ireland.
- Richard Newlove, Featherstone Rovers, Wakefield Trinity, Doncaster, Sheffield Eagles.
- Charlie Stone (1950-2018), Hull FC, Featherstone & England, brother-in-law of John

=== Nikorima brothers ===
- Kodi Nikorima Redcliffe Dolphins player
- Jayden Nikorima Melbourne Storm player

=== Norman brothers ===
- Ray Norman, (1889–1971), Australian international, New South Wales representative and Annandale, South Sydney and Eastern Suburbs NSWRFL player
- Rex Norman, (1891–1961), Australian international, New South Wales representative and Annandale, South Sydney and Eastern Suburbs NSWRFL player
- Roy Norman, (1885-1967), Annandale, Glebe & Western Suburbs NSWRFL player

=== Nu'uausala siblings ===
- Annetta Nu'uausala (born 1995), NZ international, NZ Warriors, Newcastle Knights, Brisbane Broncos player, sister of Frank-Paul
- Frank-Paul Nu'uausala (born 1987), NZ international, Sydney Roosters, Canberra Raiders, Wigan Warriors player, brother of Annetta

== O ==
=== O'Connell brothers ===
- Wally O'Connell (born 1923), Australian and New South Wales representative, Eastern Suburbs and Manly-Warringah NSWRFL player. Manly-Warringah coach
- Barry O'Connell, Eastern Suburbs and Manly-Warringah NSWRFL player

=== 1st O'Connor brothers ===
- Alf O'Connor, Australian international, New South Wales representative, South Sydney Rabbitohs player; older brother of Frank
- Frank O'Connor, Australian international, New South Wales representative, South Sydney Rabbitohs player; younger brother of Alf

=== 2nd O'Connor family ===
- Jarrod O'Connor (born 2001), Leeds Rhinos Super League player; son of Terry
- Terry O'Connor (born 1971), GB & Ireland international, Wigan, Salford & Widnes player, TV broadcaster; father of Jarrod

=== O'Donnell brothers ===
- Luke O'Donnell (born 1980), Australian international, New South Wales representative, Balmain/Wests Tigers/North Queensland/Sydney Roosters NRL player and Huddersfield SL player; older brother of Kyle
- Kyle O'Donnell (born 1990), Newcastle Knights and Canberra Raiders NRL player; younger brother of Luke

=== O'Loughlin family ===
- Keiron O'Loughlin, Lancashire representative and Wigan player; father of Sean
- Sean O'Loughlin, Great Britain and England representative, and Wigan player; son of Keiron. Sean is brother-in-law to Andy Farrell.

=== Okesene brothers ===
- Hitro Okesene, (born 1970), NZ, Samoa & American Samoa international, Manukau, Carlisle RLFC, Counties Manukau, Auckland Warriors, Hull Sharks, Featherstone Rovers, XIII Catalan & Workington Town player, brother of Paul
- Paul Okesene, (born 1967), Samoa & American Samoa international, Manukau Magpies, Sheffield Eagles & Counties Manukau player, brother of Hitro

=== O'Neill family ===
- Ethan O'Neill, (born 1999), Leigh Leopards & Leeds Rhinos player, son of Julian
- Julian O'Neill, (born 1972), Australia (SL) international, Brisbane Broncos, Widnes, London Broncos, Western Reds, South Sydney, North Qld Cowboys, Wigan Warriors, Wakefield Trinity Wildcats & Leigh Centurions player, father of Ethan

=== Orchard brothers ===
- Phillip Orchard, New Zealand international
- Robert Orchard, New Zealand international and Queensland representative player

=== Owen family ===
- Harry Owen, (1907-1966), Widnes player, father of Ray
- Ray Owen, (1940-2006), Widnes & Wakefield Trinity player, son of Harry

=== Oxford family ===
- Arthur Oxford (1895–1980), Australian international player, cousin of Aub
- Gary Stevens, (1944-2025), Australia international, South Sydney & Canterbury Bulldogs player, grandson of Arthur

== P ==
=== Paea brothers ===
- Lelea Paea (born 1983), Tonga international and Sydney Roosters NRL player
- Lopini Paea (born 1984), Tonga international and Sydney Roosters NRL player
- Mickey Paea (born 1986), Tonga international and Sydney Roosters NRL player
- Eddie Paea cousin of Lelea, Lopina and Mickey former South Sydney Player

=== Paki brothers ===
- George Paki, (1893-1974), NZ & Maori international, City Rovers player, brother of Huatahi
- Huatahi 'Brownie' Paki, (1900-1992), NZ Maori international, City Rovers & St George player, brother of George

=== Pangai brothers ===
- David Pangai, (born 1988), Tonga international player
- Mosese Pangai, (born 1991), Tonga international & North Queensland Cowboys player
- Tevita Pangai Junior, (born 1996), Tonga international, Brisbane Broncos, Penrith Panthers, Canterbury Bulldogs, Dolphins (NRL), Catalans Dragons & Warrington Wolves player

=== Papali'i family ===
- Isaiah Papali'i (born 1998), NZ & Samoa international, NZ Warriors, Eels, Wests Tigers & Panthers player, son of Lorina
- Lorina Papali'i (born 1977), Samoa international & NZ Warriors player, mother of Isaiah

=== Parcell family ===
- Gary Parcell (born 1933), Australian international and Queensland interstate representative and Ipswich Brothers player; grandfather of Matt
- Matt Parcell (born 1992), Brisbane Broncos and Manly Warringah NRL player and Leeds SL player; grandson of Gary

=== Parker brothers ===
- Gwyn Parker, (1907-1995), Wales international, Huddersfield, Leeds, Keighley, York & Rochdale Hornets player
- Tommy Parker, (1901-1969), Wales & Other Nationalities international, Wigan, Barrow & Côte Basque XIII player

=== Parkinson brothers ===
- Dave Parkinson, (1923-1978), Australia international, Cessnock, Balmain, Babinda & Parkes player, brother of Keith
- Keith Parkinson, (1919-2000), Balmain player, brother of Dave

=== Paul brothers ===
- Henry Paul (born 1974), New Zealand international and Wigan/Bradford/Harlequins Super League player
- Robbie Paul (born 1976), New Zealand international and Bradford/Huddersfield/Salford/Leigh Super League player

=== Pauli family ===
- Christine Pauli, (born 1999), Samoa international, St George Illawarra (NRLW) & Parramatta Eels (NRLW), sister of Pauli
- Pauli Pauli, (born 1994), Parramatta Eels, Newcastle Knights, Wakefield Trinity, Salford Red Devils, York Knights & Doncaster RLFC, brother of Christine

=== Paulo brothers ===
- Junior Paulo (born 1983), American international, Parramatta player
- Joseph Paulo (born 1988), Samoan and American international, Penrith, Parramatta, Cronulla, St. Helens, and Toulouse player

=== Peachey family ===
- David Peachey, Australian international, New South Wales representative and Crunulla/South Sydney NRL player; uncle of Tyrone Peachey
- Tyrone Peachey, Cronulla and Penrith NRL player; nephew of David Peachey

=== 1st Pearce family ===
- Sid "Sandy" Pearce (1883–1930), Australian international and Eastern suburbs NSWRFL player; father of Joe
- Joe Pearce (1910–1995), Australian international and Eastern suburbs NSWRFL player and coach; son of Sandy

=== 2nd Pearce family ===
- Wayne Pearce (born 1960), Australian international, New South Wales representative and Balmain Tigers player; father of Mitchell
- Mitchell Pearce (born 1989), New South Wales representative and Sydney Roosters player; son of Wayne

=== Pearce-Paul family ===
- Kai Pearce-Paul, Wigan Warriors Super League player, brother of Kam
- Kam Pearce-Paul, London Skolars player, brother of Kai

=== Peats family ===
- Geordi Peats (born 1969), Canterbury & South Sydney; father of Nathan
- Nathan Peats (born 1990), South Sydney, Parramatta, Gold Coast Titans, Leigh & Huddersfield; son of Geordi

=== Pepperell brothers ===
- Stanley Pepperell (born 1915) England international, Cumberland representative, and Seaton and Huddersfield player
- Russell Pepperell (born 1918) England international, Cumberland representative, and Seaton and Huddersfield player
- Albert Pepperell (born 1920) Great Britain international, Cumberland representative, and Seaton and Huddersfield player

=== Perenara family ===
- Henry Perenara, (born 1980), NZ & Maori international, New Zealand Warriors, Melbourne Storm, St. George Illawarra, Parramatta Eels & Cronulla Sharks player, and NRL & international referee, brother of Marcus, cousin of Sonny Bill Williams & Niall Guthrie
- Marcus Perenara, (born 1985), Parramatta Eels player, brother of Henry, cousin of Sonny Bill Williams & Niall Guthrie

=== Perrett brothers ===
- Lloyd Perrett (born 1994), Canterbury-Bankstown and Manly-Warringah NRL player
- Sam Perrett (born 1985), New Zealand international, Sydney Roosters and Canterbury-Bankstown Bulldogs player

=== Peters sisters ===
- Hilda Peters, (born 1983), NZ international & NZ Warriors player
- Kahurangi Peters, (born 1994), NZ international & NZ Warriors player
- Rona Peters, (born 1988), NZ international, Broncos & Titans player

=== Pethybridge family ===
- Gary Pethybridge, Parramatta, St. George and Parramatta player; father of Scott
- Scott Pethybridge, Penrith, North Sydney, Auckland and Northern Eagles player; son of Gary
- Rod Pethybridge, brother of Gary

=== Pezet family ===
- Troy Pezet South Queensland Crushers halfback
- Jonah Pezet Melbourne Storm halfback

=== Phillips brothers ===
- Brett Phillips, brother of Callum, Scottish international
- Callum Phillips, brother of Brett, Scottish international

=== Pickup family ===
- Laurie Pickup, Eastern Suburbs NSWRFL player, uncle of Tim
- Tim Pickup, Australian international and New South Wales interstate representative player, nephew of Laurie

=== Pimblett family ===
- Geoff Pimblett (1944–2018), England international & St Helens player; grandfather of Josh
- Josh Simm (born 2001), St Helens & Castleford Tigers Super League player; grandson of Geoff

=== Pollard family ===
- Charles "Charlie" Pollard, Great Britain international, father of Roy Pollard, older brother of Ernest Pollard
- Ernest Pollard, Great Britain international, younger brother of Charles Pollard
- Roy Pollard, Great Britain international, son of Charles Pollard

=== Plath family ===
- John Plath (born 1969), Brisbane Broncos player, father of Max
- Max Plath (born 2001), Dolphins (NRL) player, son of John

=== Platz brothers ===
- Greg Platz, Australian international, Queensland representative and Wynnum-Manly BRL player
- Lew Platz, Australian international, Queensland representative and BRL player

=== Porter family ===
- Monty Porter, (1935-2011), Western Suburbs, St. George & Cronulla-Sutherland player, father of Michael
- Michael Porter, (born 1964), Cronulla-Sutherland & Hull KR player, son of Monty

=== Prentice brothers ===
- Ward Prentice (1886–1960), Western Suburbs player
- Clarrie Prentice (1891–1948), Australian international and Western Suburbs player

=== Prescott / Whitfield family ===
- Alan Prescott (1927-1998), GB & England international, Halifax & St Helens player; cousin of Eric
- Eric Prescott (1948-2023), St Helens, Salford and Widnes RFL player; father of Steve & cousin of Alan, Colin & Robin
- Steve Prescott (1973–2013), England and Ireland international and St Helens, Hull F.C. and Wakefield Trinity player; son of Eric
- Colin Whitfield (born 1960), Salford, Wigan, Halifax, Canterbury-Bankstown & Rochdale Hornets player, brother of Robin & cousin of Eric
- Robin Whitfield (1943-2025), Widnes, Barrow & Huyton player, brother of Colin & cousin of Eric

=== Price family ===
- Brent Tate, (born 1982), Australia international, Brisbane Broncos, New Zealand Warriors & Nth Queensland Cowboys player, uncle of Riley & brother-in-law of Steve
- Riley Price, (born 2001), Nth Queensland Cowboys & Penrith Panthers player, son of Steve & nephew of Brent
- Steve Price, (born 1974), Australia international, Canterbury Bulldogs & New Zealand Warriors player, father of Riley & brother-in-law of Brent

=== Price/Diversi family ===
- Ray Price (born 1953), Dual Australian rugby international, New South Wales representative and Parramatta NSWRL player; son of Kevin, brother of Don and nephew of Peter Diversi
- Don Price (born 1956), Penrith and Parramatta player; son of Kevin, brother of Ray and nephew of Peter Diversi
- Peter Diversi (born 1932), Australian international, New South Wales representative and North Sydney and Manly-Warringah NSWRL player; uncle of Ray Price

=== Pritchard brothers ===
- Frank Pritchard (born 1983), New Zealand and Samoan international, Penrith, Canterbury-Bankstown, Hull F.C., Parramatta player
- Kaysa Pritchard (born 1994), Samoan international, Parramatta NRL player

=== Prosser brothers ===
- Dai Prosser (1912–1973), GB & Wales international, Leeds & York; younger brother of Glyn
- Glyn Prosser (1907–1972), Huddersfield; older brother of Dai

=== Provan brothers ===
- Norm Provan (born 1932), Australian international, New South Wales representative and St. George NSWRFL player; brother of Peter
- Peter Provan (born 1936), Australian international and St. George and Balmain NSWRFL player; brother of Norm

=== Pryce family ===
- Geoff Pryce (born 1961), York Wasps
- Karl Pryce (born 1986), Bradford Bulls Super League player; brother of Leon and cousin of Waine
- Leon Pryce (born 1981), English international and Bradford Bulls Super League player; brother of Karl and cousin of Waine
- Waine Pryce (born 1981), Castleford Tigers, Wakefield Trinity, Featherstone Rovers Super League player; cousin of Leon and Karl
- Will Pryce Huddersfield Giants Super League player; son of Leon and nephew of Karl

=== Puletua brothers ===
- Frank Puletua (born 1978), Samoa international and Penrith Panthers player
- Tony Puletua (born 1979), New Zealand international and Penrith Panthers player

== Q ==
=== Quinlivan brothers ===
- Alan Quinlivan (1915–1965), South Sydney & Eastern Suburbs player
- Leon Quinlivan South Sydney player
- Oscar Quinlivan (1897–1949), South Sydney & NSW player

== R ==
=== Raftstrand-Smith sisters ===
- Ebony Raftstrand-Smith, (born 2005), North Queensland Cowboys (NRLW) player, sister of Tiana
- Tiana Raftstrand-Smith, (born 2003), Gold Coast Titans (NRLW) & North Queensland Cowboys (NRLW) player, sister of Ebony

=== Randall family ===
- Terry Randall (born 1951), Australian international, New South Wales representative Manly-Warringah NSWRFL player; father of Chad
- Chad Randall (born 1980), Northern Eagles and Manly-Warringah NRL player; son of Terry

=== Rapana siblings ===
- Jordan Rapana, New Zealand and Cook Islands international, Gold Coast and Canberra NRL player; brother of Tamzin
- Tazmin Gray, Australian women's international, Sydney, Brisbane, and New Zealand Warriors NRLW player

=== Raper family ===
- Johnny Raper (born 1939), Australian international and New South Wales representative. Newtown and St George NSWRFL player and St George/Cronulla/Newtown NSWRFL coach, inaugural Rugby League Immortal; brother of Ron, father of Aaron and Stuart
- Maurie Raper, Cronulla-Sutherland and Penrith player; brother of John and Ron, uncle of Aaron and Stuart
- Ron Raper (born 1945), Canterbury-Bankstown NSWRFL player, Redcliffe BRL player and Western Suburbs BRL captain-coach; brother of John and Maurie, uncle of Aaron and Stuart
- Aaron Raper (born 1971), Australian international player, Cronulla-Sutherland/Parramatta NSWRL player, Castleford SL player, Cronulla Jersey Flegg coach; son of Johnny, nephew of Maurie and Ron and brother of Stuart
- Stuart Raper (born 1965), Cronulla-Sutherland and Western Suburbs NSWRL player and Cronulla coach; son of Johnny, nephew of Maurie and Ron and brother of Stuart

=== Rapira brothers ===
- Sam Rapira, New Zealand international and brother of Steve
- Steve Rapira, New Zealand Warriors and North Queensland Cowboys player, brother of Sam

=== Raudonikis family ===
- Lincoln Raudonikis, (born 1977), Western Suburbs player, son of Tommy
- Tommy Raudonikis, (1950-2021), Australia international, Western Suburbs, Newtown & Past Brothers player, father of Lincoln

=== Rayne twins ===
- Keith Rayne, Great Britain international, twin brother of Kevin
- Kevin Rayne, Great Britain international, twin brother of Keith

=== Reddy family ===
- Rod Reddy (born 1954), Australian international, New South Wales and Queensland representative, St. George/Illawarra player and Adelaide Rams NRL coach; father of Joel
- Joel Reddy (born 1985), Parramatta, Wests Tigers and South Sydney NRL player; son of Rod

=== Redfearn brothers ===
- David Redfearn, Great Britain international, brother of Alan
- Alan Redfearn, Great Britain international, brother of David

=== Rennie brothers ===
- Reubenn Rennie, (born 1995), Cook Islands & Maori international & Toulouse Olympique player, brother of Vincent
- Vincent Rennie, (born 1994), Cook Islands international & Newcastle Thunder player, brother of Reubenn

=== Ricketson family ===
- Doug Ricketson (1930–2019), Eastern Suburbs NSWRFL player; father of Luke
- Luke Ricketson (born 1973), Australian international and Sydney Roosters NRL player; son of Doug

=== Risman family ===
- Gus Risman (1911–1994), Great Britain international; father of Bev and John
- Bev Risman (born 1937), Great Britain international; son of Gus
- John Risman (born 1944), Wales international; son of Gus

=== Roberts family (1) ===
The Roberts family falls into the broader Dunghutti peoples family tree.

- Amos Roberts (born 1980), St George Illawarra, Penrith, Sydney, Wigan player, cousin of Tyrone, uncle of James and Tyronne
- Tyrone Roberts (born 1991), Newcastle, Gold Coast, Warrington player, cousin of Amos, first cousin once removed of James and Tyronne
- James Roberts (born 1993), South Sydney, Penrith, Gold Coast, Brisbane player, nephew of Amos, first cousin once removed of Tyrone, cousin of Tyronne
- Tyronne Roberts-Davis (born 1997), Gold Coast player, nephew of Amos, first cousin once removed of Tyrone, cousin of James

=== Roberts family (2) ===
- Josh Jordan-Roberts, (born 1998), Leeds Rhinos, Bradford Bulls, Hunslet RLFC, York City Knights, Rochdale Hornets & Midlands Hurricanes player, son of Rob
- Rob Roberts, (born 1978), Wales international, Keighley Cougars, Hunslet Hawks, Hull Sharks, Halifax Blue Sox, York Wasps, Huddersfield Giants, Leigh Centurions, Oldham RLFC, Barrow Raiders & Dewsbury Rams player, father of Josh

=== Robinson/Merritt family ===
- Ricky Walford (born 1963), Eastern Suburbs, North Sydney, St George player; son of Eric Robinson, uncle of Robinson twins and Nathan Merritt
- Reece Robinson (born 1987), Lebanon international, Brisbane, Canberra, Parramatta, Sydney, NSW Waratahs (rugby union) player; grandson of Eric Robinson, nephew of Ricky Walford, twin brother of Travis, cousin of Nathan Merritt, step-brother of Beau Champion
- Travis Robinson (born 1987), Lebanon international, Penrith player; grandson of Eric Robinson, nephew of Ricky Walford, twin brother of Reece, cousin of Nathan Merritt, step-brother of Beau Champion
- Nathan Merritt (born 1983), South Sydney, Cronulla player; grandson of Eric Robinson, nephew of Ricky Walford, cousin of Robinson twins
- Beau Champion (born 1986), South Sydney, Melbourne, Gold Coast, Parramatta player; step-brother of Robinson twins

=== Robinson brothers (1) ===
- George Robinson (1894-1987), Balmain player; brother of Jack
- Jack Robinson (1892-1981), Australia international & Balmain; brother of George

=== Robinson brothers (2) ===
- Chad Robinson (1980-2016), Parramatta Eels, Sydney Roosters & Harlequins RL, brother of Tim
- Tim Robinson (born 1988), Manly & Cronulla player; brother of Chad

=== Robinson family (1) ===
- Jason Robinson (born 1974), Great Britain & England international, Hunslet & Wigan Warriors SL player; father of Lewis Tierney.
- Lewis Tierney (born 1994), Wigan Warriors SL player; son of Jason Robinson.

=== Robinson family (2) ===
- Reece Robinson (born 1987), Lebanon international, Brisbane Broncos, Canberra Raiders, Parramatta Eels & Sydney Roosters, twin brother of Travis, step-brother of Beau & cousin of Nathan, plus related to Anthony Mundine.
- Travis Robinson (born 1987), Lebanon international, Penrith Panthers player, twin brother of Travis, step-brother of Beau & cousin of Nathan, plus related to Anthony Mundine.
- Beau Champion (born 1986), South Sydney Rabbitohs, Melbourne Storm, Gold Coast Titans & Parramatta Eels player, step-brother of Reece & Travis, cousin of Nathan, plus related to Anthony Mundine.
- Nathan Merritt (born 1983), South Sydney Rabbitohs & Cronulla player, cousin of Reece, Travis & Beau
- Anthony Mundine (born 1975), St George & Brisbane player

=== Rodwell family ===
- Brett Rodwell, (born 1970), Illawarra Steelers & South Sydney Rabbitohs player, father of Tom
- Tom Rodwell, (born 2001), Sydney Roosters player, son of Brett

=== Rogers family ===
The Rogers' total of 35 Tests is an Australian record for a father and son combination.

- Steve Rogers (1954–2006), Australian international, New South Wales representative and Cronulla/St George NSWRFL player; father of Mat
- Mat Rogers (born 1976), Dual rugby international, Queensland representative and Cronulla/Gold Coast NRL player; son of Steve

=== Rooney family ===
- Jamie Rooney, (born 1980), England international, Featherstone Rovers, Castleford Tigers, Wakefield Trinity Wildcats, Barrow Raiders, Limoux Grizzlies, South Wales Scorpions, Whitehaven RLFC & Gateshead Thunder player, father of Fletcher
- Fletcher Rooney, (born 2006), Castleford Tigers player, son of Jamie

=== Root family ===
- Eddie Root, (1902-1986), Australia international, South Sydney, Newtown & St George player, father of Stan
- Stan Root, (1924-1973), St George player, son of Eddie

=== Ropati brothers ===
- Joe Ropati, New Zealand International, Manly-Warringah NSWRL and Warrington RFL player
- Iva Ropati, New Zealand International, Sheffield, Featherstone and Oldham RFL player and Parramatta and Auckland NRL player
- Tea Ropati (born 1964) New Zealand international, Newcastle Knights and Auckland Warriors NSWRL player and St Helens RFL player
- Peter Ropati Te Atatu Roosters NZRL and Leigh Centurions RFL player

=== Rowles family ===
- Ron Rowles (born 1928), Manly-Warringah NSWRFL player; father of Peter
- Peter Rowles (born 1952), Western Suburbs and Newtown NSWRFL player, Australian rugby international; son of Ron

=== Russell brothers ===
- Barry Russell, Eastern Suburbs NSWRFL player
- Darcy Russell, Eastern Suburbs NSWRFL player

=== Ryan brothers (1) ===
- Bruce Ryan, (1921-2002), Newtown, Hull FC & Leeds player, brother of Bill
- Bill Ryan, (1919-1942), Newtown & NSW player, brother of Bruce

=== Ryan brothers (2) ===
- Bill Ryan, (1911-1975), NSW & Queensland, Western Suburbs, St. George & Ipswich player, brother of Mat
- Mat Ryan, (1913-1994), St. George player, brother of Bill

== S ==
=== Sabatié family ===
- Christian Sabatié, (born 1941), France international & Villeneuve XIII player, father of Pierre
- Pierre Sabatié, (born 1977), France international & Villeneuve XIII player, son of Christian

=== Saifiti brothers ===
- Daniel Saifiti (born 1996), Fiji, NSW & Newcastle Knights, twin brother of Jacob
- Jacob Saifiti (born 1996), Fiji & Newcastle Knights, twin brother of Daniel

=== Sailor /Gagai family ===
- Tristan Sailor (born 1998), St George Dragons & St Helens; son of Wendell
- Wendell Sailor (born 1974), Australia, Queensland, St George Dragons, Brisbane Broncos; father of Tristan
- Dane Gagai (born 1991), Brisbane Broncos, Newcastle Knights & South Sydney, cousin of Tristan
- Jacob Gagai (born 1995), South Sydney & Huddersfield Giants, cousin of Tristan

=== Salusalu family ===
- Kaiava Salusalu, (born 1957), Fiji international player, father of Semisi
- Semisi Tora, (born 1979), Fiji international & Parkes Spacemen player, son of Kaiava

=== Sambou brothers ===
- Dayon Sambou, St Helens, North Wales Crusaders, Halifax Panthers & Wigan Warriors player, brother of Jumah
- Jumah Sambou, (born 2001), St Helens & Oldham RLFC player, brother of Dayon

=== Sampson family ===
- Dave Sampson (born 1944), Wakefield Trinity, Bramley RLFC & Castleford; father of Dean & brother of Malcolm
- Dean Sampson (born 1967), GB & England, Castleford, Gold Coast Chargers & Parramatta; son of Dave & nephew of Malcolm
- Malcolm Sampson (1940–2012), Wakefield Trinity, Hull FC & Bramley RLFC; uncle of Paul & Dean and brother of Dave
- Paul Sampson (born 1977), Wakefield Trinity & London Broncos; nephew of Dave & Malcolm; cousin of Dean

Other relatives include: Olympic sprinter Denise Ramsden & TV presenter & model Kirsty Gallacher

=== Satherley family ===
- Cliff Satherley, New Zealand international, brother of Jack
- Jack Satherley, New Zealand international, brother of Cliff

=== Sattler family ===
- John Sattler (born 1942), Australian international, New South Wales and Queensland representative and South Sydney player; father of Scott
- Scott Sattler (born 1971), Queensland representative player; son of John

=== Saxton brothers ===
- Tommy Saxton, (born 1983), Castleford Tigers, Hull FC, Wakefield Trinity Wildcats, Castleford Tigers, Salford City Reds, Featherstone Rovers, Halifax & York City Knights, brother of Nicky & nephew of Alan
- Alan Banks, (born 1965), Featherstone Rovers player, brother of Barry & uncle of Nicky & Tommy
- Barry Banks, England international, York Wasps, Hull FC & Hunslet player, brother of Alan & uncle of Nicky & Tommy

=== Schirnack brothers ===
- Alan Schirnack, (born 1986), Wests Tigers player, brother of Jason
- Jason Schirnack, (born 1989), Wests Tigers player, brother of Alan

=== Schultz brothers and sons ===
- Bill Schultz, New Zealand international
- Paul Schultz, New Zealand international

=== Schuster brothers ===
- Fred Schuster, (born 1948), NZ international & Maris Saints player, brother of John
- John Schuster, (born 1964), Western Samoa international, Newcastle Knights & Halifax RLFC player, brother of Fred

=== Scott brothers and cousins ===
- Alf Scott, Auckland representative
- Verdun Scott, New Zealand international and New Zealand cricket international
- Len Scott, New Zealand international (cousin of Alf and Verdun)

=== Sculthorpe brothers ===
- Paul Sculthorpe (born 1977), English international, Warrington Wolves & St Helens Super League player
- Danny Sculthorpe (born 1979), Leeds, Wigan, Castleford, Warrington Wolves & Wakefield Super League player

=== Seagar brothers ===
- Allan Seagar, (1903-1984), NZ international player, brother of George
- George Seagar, (1888-1968), NZ international player, brother of Allan

=== Seeling family ===
- Charlie Seeling, (1883-1956), Wigan player, father of Charlie Seeling Jr
- Charlie Seeling Jr., Warrington, Wigan, Dewsbury & Batley player, son of Charlie Seeling

=== Segeyaro family ===
- Ifiso Segeyaro, Papua New Guinea international player; father of James.
- James Segeyaro, Papua New Guinea international player; son of Ifiso.

=== Senior brothers ===
- Innes Senior (born 2000), Ireland international, Huddersfield Giants, Wakefield Trinity & Castleford Tigers Super League player; twin of Louis
- Louis Senior (born 2000), Ireland international, Huddersfield Giants, Hull KR & Castleford Tigers Super League player; twin of Innes

=== Seu Seu brothers ===
- Jerry Seu Seu (born 1974), New Zealand and Samoa international, New Zealand Warriors NRL player and Wigan SL player; older brother of Anthony
- Anthony Seu Seu, New Zealand Warriors NRL player and Halifax SL player

=== Seumanufagai family ===
- Ava Seumanufagai (born 1991), Wests Tigers, Cronulla, Leeds, Canterbury Bulldogs, Leigh player, cousin of Tasia
- Tasia Seumanufagai (born 1989), New Zealand Warriors (W), cousin of Ava

=== Shead brothers ===
- Artie Shead, New Zealand Māori and French international
- Phillip Shead, New Zealand Māori and French international

=== Sheens brothers ===
- Tim Sheens (born 1950), Penrith Panthers NSWRL player, Australian international and New South Wales Origin coach
- Bob Sheens, Eastern Suburbs NSWRL player

=== Shelford family ===
- Adrian Shelford (1964–2003), NZ international, Wigan, Newcastle Knights, Manly, Wakefield Trinity, Sheffield Eagles; father of Kyle
- Kyle Shelford (born 1996), Wigan, Swinton, Rochdale Hornets & Warrington Wolves; son of Adrian
- Darrel Shelford, (born 1962), Scotland international, Bradford Northern & Huddersfield Giants player, cousin of Adrian

=== Shibasaki brothers ===
- Gehamat Shibasaki (born 1998), Brisbane Broncos & Newcastle Knights; brother of Jamal
- Jamal Shibasaki (born 2005), Nth Qld Cowboys; brother of Gehamat

=== Shorrocks brothers ===
- Jake Shorrocks (born 1995), Wigan Warriors Super League player, brother of Joe
- Joe Shorrocks (born 1999), Wigan Warriors Super League player, brother of Jake

=== Sigsworth brothers ===
- Phil Sigsworth, (born 1959), Australia international, Newtown Jets, Manly Sea Eagles, Canterbury Bulldogs & Balmain player, brother of Ron
- Ron Sigsworth, (born 1961), Newtown, Canterbury Bulldogs & Castleford player, brother of Phil

=== Silcock family ===
- Nat Silcock, Sr., Great Britain international player
- Nat Silcock, Jr. (born 1927), Great Britain international player and NSWRFL coach

=== Simpkins family ===
- Robert Simpkins, South Sydney Rabbitohs, Sydney Roosters and Gold Coast Chargers player; father of Ryan
- Ryan Simpkins, Penrith Panthers player; son of Robert

=== Sims siblings ===
Born to an Australian father, Peter, and a Fijian mother, Jacqueline, all 5 of the Gerringong-raised Sims siblings have achieved national honours in their respective sports, with 4 having played rugby league professionally.

- Ruan Sims (born 1982), Australian women's international, Australian rugby union and rugby sevens international, Sydney Roosters NRLW plauyer
- Ashton Sims (born 1985), Fijian international, St. George Illawarra, Brisbane, North Queensland, Warrington, Toronto player
- Canecia "CJ" Sims (c. 1988), Fijian women's international, Australian women's Gridiron international
- Tariq Sims (born 1990), Fijian international, North Queensland, Newcastle, St. George Illawarra player, NSW Blues
- Korbin Sims (born 1992), Fijian international, Newcastle, Brisbane player

A cousin of the Sims siblings, Reagan Campbell-Gillard (born 1993), is an Australian and Fijian international who has played Penrith and Parramatta in the NRL.

=== Sinfield family ===
- Ian Sinfield, Scotland international; older brother of Kevin
- Kevin Sinfield, GB, England & Leeds Rhinos; brother of Ian
- Jack Sinfield, Leeds Rhinos player, son of Kevin

=== Sironen family ===
- Paul Sironen (born 1965), Australian international, New South Wales Origin representative and Balmain Tigers player; father of Curtis & Bayley
- Curtis Sironen (born 1993), West Tigers, Manly-Warringah Sea Eagles player; son of Paul
- Bayley Sironen (born 1996), South Sydney Rabbitohs player, son of Paul

=== Smales family ===
- Ian Smales, (born 1968), Featherstone Rovers, Castleford Tigers & Hunslet Hawks player, son of Tommy
- Tommy Smales, (born 1938), Wigan, Barrow & Featherstone Rovers player, father of Ian

=== Smith brothers of Australia ===
- Darren Smith (born 1968), Australian international, Queensland State of Origin and Canterbury Bulldogs/Brisbane Broncos NRL player
- Jason Smith (born 1972), Australian international, Queensland State of Origin and Canterbury Bulldogs/Parramatta/Canberra/North Queensland NRL player

=== Smith brothers of England ===
- Daniel Smith (born 1993), Wakefield Trinity, Huddersfield Giants & Castleford Tigers Super League player; brother of Cameron
- Cameron Smith (born 1998), Leeds Rhinos Super League player; brother of Daniel

=== Smith family of New Zealand ===
- George W. Smith, New Zealand international in rugby union and rugby league, uncle of Dick and Jack Smith
- Dick Smith, New Zealand international, nephew of George Smith
- Jack Smith, New Zealand international, nephew of George Smith

=== Smith family (1) ===
- Brian Smith (born 1954), St George Dragons, Parramatta Eels, Newcastle Knights and Sydney Roosters NRL coach; brother of Tony and father of Rohan
- Tony Smith (born 1967), Great Britain national coach; brother of Brian and uncle of Rohan
- Rohan Smith, Tonga national team coach; son of Brian and nephew of Tony

=== Smith family (2) ===
- Reimis Smith (born 1997), Canterbury Bulldogs, Melbourne Storm & Catalans Dragons player, son of Tyran, nephew of Anthony
- Tyran Smith (born 1974), New Zealand international, South Sydney Rabbitohs, North Qld Cowboys, Hunter Mariners, Auckland Warriors, Balmain Tigers, Wests Tigers & Canberra Raiders, father of Reimis, brother-in-law of Anthony Mundine
- Anthony Mundine (born 1975), St George & Brisbane player, brother-in-aw of Tyran, uncle of Reimis

=== Smith family (3) ===
- Morgan Smith, (born 1998), Warrington Wolves, Rochdale Hornets, London Broncos, York City Knights, Featherstone Rovers, Wakefield Trinity, Hull FC & Sheffield Eagles player, grandson of Peter
- Peter Smith, (born 1955), GB & England international, Featherstone Rovers & Scarborough Pirates player, grandfather of Morgan

=== Smith family (4) ===
- Frank Smith Sr., Castleford & Dewsbury player, father of Frank Jr.
- Frank Smith Jr., Featherstone Rovers & Castleford player, son of Frank Sr.

=== Sorensen family ===
- Bill Sorensen, Tongan-born New Zealand international, brother of Dave, uncle of Dane and Kurt, grandfather of Scott
- Dane Sorensen, New Zealand international, Cronulla-Sutherland and Eastern Suburbs NSWRFL player, brother of Kurt, nephew of Dave and Bill
- Kurt Sorensen, New Zealand international, Cronulla-Sutherland and Eastern Suburbs NSWRFL player, brother of Dane, nephew of Dave and Bill
- Scott Sorensen, Australian-born Cronulla-Sutherland Sharks, Canberra Raiders player, grandson of Bill

In addition, New Zealand and Samoa international Leeson Ah Mau married Rose Sorensen Cann (granddaughter of Bill and cousin of Scott), while Chad Townsend married Marissa Sorensen (granddaughter of Bill and sister of Scott).

=== Southernwood family ===
- Cain Southernwood, son of Graham; Bradford, Dewsbury, Batley, Whitehaven & Hunslet
- Graham Southernwood, father of Cain; Castleford, Featherstone & Hunslet
- Roy Southernwood, brother of Graham; Castleford, Halifax & Wakefield

=== Southwell sisters ===
- Hannah Southwell, (born 1999), Australia international, St George Illawarra, Sydney Roosters & Newcastle Knights player, sister of Jesse
- Jesse Southwell, (born 2005), Newcastle Knights player, sister of Hannah

=== Spencer brothers of New Zealand ===
- George Spencer, New Zealand international
- John Spencer, New Zealand international

=== Spencer family of Australia ===
- Jack Spencer, Balmain NSWRFL player; father of John
- John Spencer, Balmain NSWRFL player; son of Jack

=== Spina family ===
- Ben Spina, North Queensland Cowboys player, son of Laurie
- Laurie Spina, North Sydney Bears, Sydney Roosters, Cronulla-Sutherland Sharks and North Queensland Cowboys player; father of Ben

=== St George brothers ===
- Neville St George, New Zealand international and Auckland representative
- Ed St George, New Zealand international and Auckland representative

=== Stanaway brothers ===
- Alex Stanaway, New Zealand international and Māori representative
- Jack Stanaway, international referee and Māori representative

=== Stephenson family ===
- Francis Stephenson (born 1976), England international, Wakefield Trinity, Wigan, London Broncos & Hull KR; son of Nigel
- Nigel Stephenson (born 1950), England international, Dewsbury, Bradford Northern, Carlisle, Wakefield Trinity, York Wasps & Huddersfield; father of Francis

Not related to: Mike Stephenson (Stevo)

=== Stewart brothers ===
- Brett Stewart (born 1985), Australian international, New South Wales representative and Manly-Warringah NRL player
- Glenn Stewart (born 1984), Australian international, New South Wales representative, Manly-Warringah and South Sydney NRL player, Catalans Dragons and Leigh SL player

=== Stewart family ===
- Bruce Stewart, Eastern Suburbs NSWRFL player; father of Corey
- Corey Stewart, Eastern Suburbs NSWRL player; son of Bruce

=== Stirling family ===
- Ivor Stirling, New Zealand international 1939
- Ken Stirling, New Zealand international 1971–8; son of Ivor

=== Stone family ===
- Rick Stone (born 1967), South Sydney Rabbitohs; father of Sam
- Sam Stone (born 1997), Malta international, Newcastle Knights, Gold Coast Titans, Leigh Centurions & Salford Red Devils player; son of Rick

=== Stonestreet family ===
- George Stonestreet (1915–1993), Newtown player, grandfather of Terry Hill, cousin of Ken
- Ken Stonestreet (1942–2015), Eastern Suburbs & Western Suburbs player, cousin of George, grandfather of Sam, cousin of Terry Hill
- Samuel Stonestreet (born 2002), Cronulla Sharks, grandson of Ken, great nephew of George, cousin of Terry
- Terry Hill, (1972-2024), Australia international, South Sydney, Eastern Suburbs, Western Suburbs, Manly Sea Eagles & Wests Tigers

=== Strange family ===
- Ethan Strange, (born 2004), Canberra Raiders player, son of John & brother of Jasmin
- Jasmin Strange, (born 2002), Sydney Roosters & Newcastle Knights player, daughter of John & sister of Ethan

=== Stuart family ===
- Jed Stuart, (born 2001), Canberra Raiders player, son of Ricky
- Ricky Stuart, (born 1967), Australia international, Canberra Raiders & Canterbury Bulldogs player, father of Jed

=== Sullivan family of Australia ===
- Con Sullivan, New Zealand and Australian international, New South Wales representative and North Sydney NSWRFL player; father of Bob
- Bob Sullivan, Australian international and North Sydney NSWRFL player; son of Con

=== Sullivan family of Wales ===
- Clive Sullivan (1943–1985), Welsh and Great Britain international and Hull, Hull KR, Oldham and Doncaster player; father of Anthony
- Anthony Sullivan (born 1968), Great Britain and Dual Welsh rugby international, Hull KR and St Helens player; son of Clive

=== Swann family ===
- Anthony Swann (born 1975), New Zealand and Samoa international, Auckland/North Sydney/Canberra NRL player and Warrington Wolves SL player; brother of Willie and cousin of Logan
- Willie Swann (born 1974), Samoa international, Auckland Warriors and Warrington Wolves player; brother of Anthony and cousin of Logan
- Logan Swann (born 1975), New Zealand international, Auckland Warriors NRL player and Bradford Bulls and Warrington Wolves player; cousin of Anthony and Willie

== T ==
=== Tagive brothers ===
- Peni Tagive (born 1988), Wests, St George Dragons & Sydney Roosters; older brother of Ratu
- Ratu Tagive (born 1991), Canterbury Bulldogs, Sydney Roosters & Wests Tigers; younger brother of Peni

=== Takairangi family ===
- Louis Takaraingi, Parramatta Eels player, father of Kiana & Brad
- Kiana Takairangi, (born 1992), Sydney Roosters, Newcastle Knights & Cronulla Sharks player, daughter of Louis & sister of Brad
- Brad Takairangi, (born 1989), Roosters, Titans, Knights & Hull KR player, son of Louis & brother of Kiana

=== Tago brothers ===
- Izack Tago, (born 2002), Samoa international & Penrith Panthers player, brother of Jake
- Jake Tago, (born 1999), Samoa international & Parramatta Eels player, brother of Izack

=== Talau family ===
- Tommy Talau, (born 2000), Samoa international, Wests Tigers & Manly Sea Eagles player, son of Willie
- Willie Talau, (born 1976), New Zealand & Samoa international, Taranaki Rockets, Canterbury Bulldogs, St Helens & Salford City Reds player, father of Tommy

=== Tamati family ===
- Howie Tamati, New Zealand international player and coach, Wigan RFL player; cousin of Kevin
- Kevin Tamati (born 1953), New Zealand and New Zealand Māori international, Widnes and Warrington RFL player; cousin of Howie

=== Tangata-Toa brothers ===
- Andrew Tangata-Toa, (born 1974), Newcastle Knights, St George Dragons & Huddersfield Giants player, brother of David
- David Tangata-Toa, (born 1981), Hull Kingston Rovers & Celtic Crusaders player, brother of Andrew

=== Tasi brothers ===
- Lama Tasi, (born 1990), Samoa international, Sydney Roosters, Brisbane Broncos, Salford Red Devils, St Helens & Warrington Wolves player, brother of Tautalatasi and cousin of Raymond
- Tautalatasi Tasi, (born 1994), South Sydney Rabbitohs player, brother of Lama & cousin of Raymond
- Raymond Faitala-Mariner, (born 1993), Samoa & NZ international, New Zealand Warriors, Canterbury Bulldogs & St. George Illawarra player, cousin of Lama & Tautalatasi

=== Tassell brothers ===
- Brad Tassell, CEO of PNG Hunters, brother of Jason and Kris
- Jason Tassell (born 1969), Eastern Suburbs & South Sydney; brother of Brad & Kris
- Kris Tassell (born 1973), Canberra Raiders, Canterbury Bulldogs, N Queensland Cowboys, Salford City Reds, Wakefield Trinity & Swinton Lions; brother of Brad & Jason

=== Tatupu/Simona/Wright/Sene-Lafeo/Sauiluma/Liolevave family ===
- Tony Tatupu (born 1969), Western Samoa and New Zealand international, Auckland NRL, Warrington and Wakefield SL player; uncle of Matthew Wright
- Tim Simona (born 1991), Samoan international and Wests Tigers NRL player; uncle of Jesse Sene-Lefao and Matthew Wright, cousin of Sami Sauiluma and Michael Chee-Kam
- Matthew Wright (born 1991), Samoan international and Cronulla, North Queensland and Manly-Warringah NRL player; nephew of Tony Tatupu and Tim Simona, cousin of Jesse Sene-Lefao and Lamar Liolevave
- Jesse Sene-Lefao (born 1989), Samoan international, Manly-Warringah and Cronulla NRL player and Castleford SL player; nephew of Tim Simona and cousin of Matthew Wright
- Sami Sauiluma (born 1991), Canberra, Cronulla and Gold Coast Titans NRL player; cousin of Tim Simona
- Lamar Liolevave (born 1995), Wests Tigers and Canterbury-Bankstown NRL player; cousin of Matthew Wright
- Michael Chee-Kam (born 1992), Manly, Wests Tigers & South Sydney NRL player, cousin of Tim Simona

=== Teitzel family ===
- Craig Teitzel, (born 1963), Western Suburbs, Illawarra Steelers, Warrington Wolves & Nth Queensland player, father of Romy
- Romy Teitzel, (born 1999), Brisbane Broncos & Newcastle Knights player, daughter of Craig

=== Temara sisters ===
- Chante Temara, (born 2001), Brisbane Broncos, Roosters & Canberra Raiders player, sister of Zahara
- Zahara Temara, (born 1997), Australia, Queensland, Roosters & Canberra Raiders player, sister of Chante

=== Tennant family ===
- Alan Tennant (1930–1997), Featherstone Rovers; son of Buff Lord
- Clive Tennant (born 1956), Featherstone Rovers; son of Walter, grandson of Buff Lord (Harold Tennant), and nephew of Alan
- Buff Lord (1892–1985), Hull KR; father of Nelson, Walter & Alan
- Nelson Tennant (1923–2006), Featherstone Rovers & St Helens; son of Buff Lord, and younger brother of Walter Tennant, and the older brother of Alan Tennant, uncle of Clive Tennant
- Walter Tennant (1921-unknown), Featherstone Rovers & Wakefield Trinity, father of Clive, son of Harold (Buff Lord)

=== Thaiday family ===
- Sam Thaiday (born 1985), Australian international, Queensland Origin representative and Brisbane Broncos NRL player; cousin of Milton
- Milton Thaiday (born 1980), Newcastle Knights player

=== Thewlis brothers ===
- Jake Thewlis, (born 2005), Warrington Wolves, North Wales Crusaders, London Broncos & Salford Red Devils player, brother of Josh
- Josh Thewlis, (born 2002), Warrington Wolves player, brother of Jake

=== Thompson twins ===
- Leo Thompson, (born 2000), New Zealand international & Newcastle Knights player
- Tyrone Thompson, (born 2000), Newcastle Knights player

=== Thomson family ===
- Allan Thomson (1943–2006), Australian international and Manly-Warringah NSWRFL player; brother of Jim and uncle of Gary and Ian
- Ian Thomson (born 1956), Australian international and New South Wales representative, Manly-Warringah and Balmain player, and Manly-Warringah CEO; son of Jim, nephew of Allan and brother of Gary

=== Thornett brothers ===
- Ken Thornett (born 1937), Australian international, New South Wales representative and Parramatta NSWRFL player and coach and Leeds RFL player
- Dick Thornett (born 1940), Dual Australian rugby international, New South Wales representative and Parramatta and Eastern Suburbs NSWRFL player

=== Tittleton brothers ===
- George Tittleton, New Zealand international
- Wally Tittleton, New Zealand international

=== Tomkins brothers ===
- Joel Tomkins, (born 1987), England international representative and Super League Wigan Warriors, Hull KR & Catalans Dragons player
- Sam Tomkins, (born 1989), England international representative and Super League Wigan Warriors & Catalan Dragons player, New Zealand Warriors NRL player.
- Logan Tomkins, (born 1992), Wigan Warriors, Widnes, Workington Town & Salford Red Devils player

=== Tonga brothers ===
- Willie Tonga (born 1983), Australian international and NRL player
- Esi Tonga (born 1988), Tonga international and NRL player

=== Trbojevic brothers ===
- Ben Trbojevic (born 2001), Manly Sea Eagles player; youngest brother of Jake & Tom
- Jake Trbojevic (born 1994), Australian international, New South Wales representative, Manly-Warringah NRL player
- Tom Trbojevic (born 1996), Australian international, New South Wales representative, Manly-Warringah NRL player

=== Trevathan/Trevathen family ===
- William Trevarthen, 1907–08 New Zealand international
- David Trevathan, brother of Thomas, All Black
- Thomas Trevarthan, brother of David, New Zealand international

=== Trindall brothers ===
- Craig Trindall (born 1979), Penrith Panthers NRL player, brother of Darrell and Steve
- Darrell Trindall (born 1972), South Sydney Rabbitohs NSWRL player, brother of Craig and Steve
- Steve Trindall (born 1973), Canberra Raiders NSWRL player, brother of Craig and Darrell
- Braydon Trindall, son of darrell

=== Tronc family ===
- Scott Tronc (born 1965) Western Suburbs, Canterbury, South Sydney, Brisbane Broncos; brother of James
- Shane Tronc (born 1982) N Queensland Cowboys, Wakefield Trinity & Brisbane Broncos; son of James

=== Trout brothers ===
- Kyle Trout, (born 1991), Wakefield Trinity Wildcats, Doncaster RLFC, Batley Bulldogs, Featherstone Rovers, Whitehaven RLFC, Hunslet Hawks, Dewsbury Rams, Sheffield Eagles, Hull KR, Limoux Grizzlies, Newcastle Thunder & Keighley Cougars
- Owen Trout (born 1999), Leeds Rhinos, Dewsbury Rams, Featherstone Rovers, Huddersfield Giants & Leigh Leopards

=== Tuimavave/Winterstein family ===
- Tony Tuimavave (born 1969), Samoan international, Sheffield Eagles Super League and Auckland Warriors NRL player, brother of Paddy and Paki and uncle of Antonio
- Paddy Tuimavave, New Zealand and Samoa international player; uncle of Evarn, brother of Tony and Paki and uncle of Antonio
- Paki Tuimavave, Western Samoa international; brother of Tony and Paddy
- Evarn Tuimavave (born 1984), New Zealand international and Newcastle Knights player; nephew of Tony and Paddy
- Carlos Tuimavave, New Zealand Warriors player; nephew of Tony and Paddy and cousin of Antonio
- Antonio Winterstein (born 1988), North Queensland Cowboys player; nephew of Tony and Paddy and cousin of Evarn and Carlos Tuimavave and Frank Winterstein
- Frank Winterstein (born 1986), Samoan international, Canterbury-Bankstown and Manly-Warringah NRL player, Wakefield Trinity, Crusaders and Widnes SL player; cousin of Antonio

=== Tupou brothers ===
- Anthony Tupou, (born 1984), Australian international; Sydney Roosters and Cronulla-Sutherland Sharks player
- Willie Tupou, (born 1985), former Newcastle Knights player

=== Tuqiri family ===
- Elia Tuqiri (born 1982), Brisbane Broncos; cousin of Lote
- Lote Tuqiri (born 1979), Fiji & Australia dual-code & Brisbane Broncos, Wests Tigers & South Sydney; cousin of Elia

=== Tyrer family ===
- Colin Tyrer, Lancashire, Leigh, Wigan, Barrow and Hull Kingston Rovers player, father of Shaun and Christian
- Christian Tyrer (born 1973), Widnes, Keighley Cougars, and Bath (RU) player, son of Colin, and brother of Shaun

=== Tyquin brothers ===
- Bill Tyquin (1919–1999), Australian international, Queensland and New South Wales representative, Souths Magpies and Brisbane Brothers BRL player and St George NSWRFL player
- Tom Tyquin (born 1932), Queensland representative and Souths Magpies BRL player

== V ==
=== Va'a brothers ===
- De La Salle Va'a, (born 2005), Sydney Roosters player
- Xavier Va'a, (born 2003), Sydney Roosters player

=== Vagana cousins ===
- Isaiah Vagana, (born 2000), Wakefield Trinity player, son of Joe
- Joe Vagana (born 1975), New Zealand and Samoa international, and Auckland Warriors NRL player, father of Isaiah & cousin of Nigel
- Nigel Vagana (born 1975), New Zealand and Samoa international, and Auckland Warriors, Bulldogs, Sharks, Rabbitohs NRL player, cousin of Joe & 2nd cousin of Isaiah

=== Valentine brothers of Scotland ===
- Alec Valentine (1928–1997), Scotland rugby union international, younger brother of Dave and elder brother of Rob
- Dave Valentine (1926–1976), Great Britain international & Huddersfield, elder brother of Alec and Rob
- Rob Valentine (born 1941), Great Britain international, Huddersfield, Wakefield Trinity & Keighley – younger brother of Alec and Dave

=== Valentine brothers of England ===
- Jim Valentine – 1880s, '90s, 1900s Rugby Union & Northern Union (from 1896). England, Lancashire & club level for Swinton.
- Bob Valentine – 1890s & 1900s Northern Union. Lancashire & club level for Swinton. Also as goalkeeper for Manchester United F.C.
- Albert Valentine – 1900s & 1910s Northern Union. Club level for Swinton.

=== Van Bellen brothers ===
- Gary Van Bellen (born 1957), Bradford Northern, Hunslet RLFC, Leigh, Wakefield Trinity & Sheffield Eagles; younger brother of Ian
- Ian Van Bellen (1945–2019), Huddersfield, Bradford Northern, Castleford, Fulham RLFC, Blackpool Borough, Halifax, Kent Invicta & Keighley; older brother of Gary

=== Veivers family ===
- Greg Veivers (born 1949), Australian international, Queensland representative and Souths Magpies player; son of Jack, brother of Phil and cousin of Mick
- Phil Veivers (born 1964), Souths Magpies, St. Helens and Huddersfield player, Assistant coach at Bradford and Wigan, Coach at Salford City Reds Super League; son of Jack, brother of Greg and cousin of Mick, Father of Josh
- Mick Veivers (born 1939), Australian international, Queensland representative, Souths Magpies BRL (Brisbane) and Manly-Warringah (NSWRFL) player; nephew of Jack and cousin of Greg and Phil
- Josh Veivers (born 1989), Wigan, Wakefield and Salford player, son of Phil, nephew of Greg, Grandson of Jack and Cousin of Mick
- Wayne Bennett, (born 1950), Australia international, Huddersfield, Past Brothers & South Suburbs player, brother-in-law of Phil & Greg

== W ==
=== Walker family (1) ===
- Ben Walker (born 1976), Brisbane Broncos, Northern Eagles, Manly-Warringah and South Sydney Rabbitohs NRL player; brother of Shane and Chris, father of Sam
- Shane Walker (born 1978), Brisbane Broncos and South Sydney Rabbitohs NRL player
- Chris Walker (born 1980), Queensland State of Origin representative, Brisbane/South Sydney/Sydney Roosters/Melbourne/Gold Coast/North Queensland NRL player
- Sam Walker (born 2002), Sydney Roosters player

=== Walker family (2) ===
- Cody Walker (born 1990), Rabbitohs player, brother of Ryan & cousin of Shannon
- Ryan Walker (born 1986), Penrith Panthers player, brother of Cody & cousin of Shannon
- Shannon Walker (born 1988), Gold Coast Titans player, cousin of Cody & Ryan
- Daine Laurie (born 1999), Penrith Panthers & Wests Tigers player, cousin of Cody & Ryan

=== Walker brothers of Britain ===
- Adam Walker, brother of Jonathan, Scottish international
- Jonathan Walker, brother of Adam, Scottish international

=== Walne brothers ===
- Adam Walne, brother of Jordan, Huddersfield & Salford
- Jordan Walne, brother of Adam, Hull KR & Salford

=== Walters family ===
- Steve Walters (born 1965), Australian international, Queensland State of Origin and Canberra/North Queensland/Newcastle NRL player
- Kevin Walters (born 1967), Australian international, Queensland State of Origin, Canberra Raiders and Brisbane Broncos NRL player; twin of Kerrod
- Kerrod Walters (born 1967), Australian international, Queensland State of Origin and Brisbane Broncos and Adelaide Rams NRL player; twin of Kevin
- Billy Walters (born 1994), Former Melbourne Storm and current Brisbane Broncos NRL player; son of Kevin, nephew of Steve and Kerrod

=== Ward brothers ===
- Donald Ward (1914-unknown), Dewsbury, Bradford Northern & Celtic de Paris; brother of Ernest
- Ernest Ward (1920–1987), GB & England international, Bradford Northern & Castleford; brother of Donald

=== Wardle brothers ===
- Joe Wardle (born 1991), Scotland international, Bradford Bulls, Huddersfield Giants, Newcastle Knights, Castleford Tigers, Leigh Leopards & Oldham player; brother of Jake
- Jake Wardle (born 1998), England international, Huddersfield Giants, Warrington Wolves & Wigan Warriors Super League player; brother of Joe

=== Warren family ===
- Ray Warren (born 1943), rugby league commentator and father of Chris
- Chris Warren (born 1970) Western Suburbs NSWRL player, television presenter and son of Ray

=== Watene family ===
- Adam Watene (1977–2008), Cook Island international and Super League player; cousin of Frank
- Frank Watene (born 1977), Tonga international and Super League player; cousin of Adam

=== Watene-Zelezniak family ===
- Puti Tipene Watene (1910–1967; "Steve"), New Zealand international, later a Member of Parliament; great-grandfather of Malakai and Dallin
- Malakai Watene-Zelezniak (born 1991), Penrith, Wests Tigers player; brother of Dallin
- Dallin Watene-Zelezniak (born 1995), Penrith, Bulldogs player; brother of Malakai

=== Watt family ===
- Horrie Watt (1891-1969), Australian international player; uncle of George
- George Watt, (1917-2010), Australian international player; nephew of Horrie
- Neville Watt (1930-2019), Balmain player; nephew of Horrie

=== Webster brothers ===
- Andrew Webster, (born 1982), coach of Wests Tigers, Penrith Panthers & New Zealand Warriors, brother of James
- James Webster, (born 1979), Balmain, Parramatta, Hull KR, Hull FC & Widnes player, coach of Wakefield Trinity, Hull KR & Featherstone Rovers, brother of Andrew

=== West family ===
- Graeme West (born 1953), New Zealand international and Wigan RFL player. Wigan and Widnes RFL coach; father of Dwayne
- Dwayne West (born 1980), Wigan, St Helens and Hull F.C. SL player, son of Graeme

=== White brothers of Australia ===
- Percy White (1888–1918), Eastern Suburbs NSWRFL player
- Eddie White (1883–1962), Eastern Suburbs NSWRFL player

=== Why brothers ===
- Jack Why, Australian international and South Sydney player
- Alby Why, South Sydney player and Canterbury-Bankstown coach

=== Willey/Don family ===
- Ron Willey (1929–2004), New South Wales representative player and coach, Manly-Warringah player and premiership coach, Canterbury-Bankstown and Parramatta player. Balmain, North Sydney, South Sydney, Penrith and Bradford Northern coach; grandfather of Anthony Don
- Anthony Don (born 1987), Gold Coast Titans NRL player; grandson of Ron Willey

=== Williams brothers ===
- John Williams (born 1985), Parramatta, Sydney Roosters, North Queensland and Cronulla NRL player
- David Williams (born 1986), Australian international, New South Wales Origin representative and Manly-Warringah NRL player

=== Williams family ===
- Joe Williams, (born 1983), South Sydney, Penrith Panthers & Canterbury Bulldogs player, son of Wilfred
- Wilfred Williams, (born 1960), Eastern Suburbs, Western Suburbs & St. George Dragons player, father of Joe

=== Williamson family ===
- Lionel Williamson (born 1944), Australian international and Queensland and New South Wales representative player, Halifax RFL and Newtown NSWRFL player; brother of Henry and uncle of Luke
- Luke Williamson (born 1978), Adelaide/Canberra/Northern Eagles/Manly-Warringah NRL player, Harlequins SL player; son of Henry and nephew of Lionel
- Lindsay Collins (born 1996), Queensland representative and Sydney Roosters NRL player; grandson of Lionel

=== Wilson family ===
- Graham Wilson, Australian international, New South Wales representative and Cronulla-Sutherland NSWRL player; father of Alan
- Alan Wilson, New South Wales representative and Cronulla-Sutherland NSWRL player; son of Graham
- Craig Wilson, North Sydney, South Qld Crushers, Illawarra, Gateshead Thunder & Hull FC player; son of Graham
- Kevin Hogan, Cronulla & Parramatta player; brother-in-law of Graham, uncle of Alan & Craig

=== Wishart family ===
- Rod Wishart Illawarra Steelers winger, father of Tyran
- Tyran Wishart Melbourne Storm player, son of Rod

=== Witt brothers ===
- Michael Witt (born 1984), Parramatta, Manly-Warringah, NZ Warriors, Celtic Crusaders, London Broncos and St George Illawarra player
- Steve Witt (born 1982), Newcastle Knights player

=== Wittenberg family ===
- John Wittenberg (1938–2005), Australian international, Queensland and New South Wales representative. St George NSWRFL player; father of Jeff
- Jeff Wittenberg (born 1973), St George/South Queensland NSWRL player, Bradford/Huddersfield SL player; son of John

=== Wolfgramm family ===
- Greg Wolfgramm, (born 1974), Tonga international & Canberra Raiders player, cousin of Willie
- Willie Wolfgramm, (born 1970), Tonga international, Counties Manukau & Swinton Lions player, cousin of Greg

=== Wood family ===
- Barry Wood (born 1950), Newtown, South Sydney & North Sydney Bears; father of Garth & Nathan
- Garth Wood (born 1978), South Sydney, Balmain & Super Middleweight boxer; son of Barry & brother of Nathan
- Nathan Wood (born 1972), Balmain Tigers, Sydney Roosters, NZ Warriors, Wakefield Trinity & Warrington Wolves; son of Barry & brother of Garth

=== Woodman sisters ===
- Sharnita Woodman (born 1986), NZ international player, twin sister of Shontelle
- Shontelle Woodman (born 1986), NZ international & NZ Warriors player, twin sister of Sharnita

=== Woolford family ===
- Simon Woolford (born 1975), Canberra Raiders & St George Illawarra player & coach, father of Zac
- Zac Woolford (born 1996), Canberra Raiders & Huddersfield Giants player, son of Simon

=== Worrincy brothers ===
- Michael Worrincy (born 1986), London Super League player
- Rob Worrincy (born 1985), London Super League player

=== Wray family ===
- Cai Taylor-Wray, (born 2006), Warrington Wolves & Widnes Vikings player, son of Jamaine
- Jamaine Wray, (born 1984), Jamaica international, Hunslet Hawks, York City Knights, Keighley Cougars & London Skolars player, father of Cai

=== Wynyard brothers ===
- William Wynyard, New Zealand international player
- Richard Wynyard, New Zealand international player

=== Wynn brothers ===
- Peter Wynn (born 1957), Australian international, New South Wales representative, and Parramatta Eels NSWRL player
- Graeme Wynn (born 1959), New South Wales representative, St. George and Western Suburbs NSWRL player

== Y ==
=== Yakich brothers ===
- Fred Yakich, Manly-Warringah NSWRFL player
- Nick Yakich, New South Wales representative and Manly-Warringah NSWRFL player

=== Yates family ===
- John Yates, New Zealand international; brother of Victor
- Victor Yates, Auckland representative and New Zealand rugby union international; brother of John

=== Yeo family ===
- Isaah Yeo, Penrith Panthers players; son of Justin
- Justin Yeo, North Sydney Bears and Balmain Tigers player; father of Isaah

=== Young family (1) ===
- Craig Young (born 1956), Australian international, New South Wales representative, and St George NSWRL player and coach; father of Dean
- Dean Young (born 1983), St. George Illawarra NRL player and son of Craig

=== Young family (2) ===
- Michael Young, (born 1984), Newcastle Knights player, husband of Rebecca Young
- Rebecca Young, (born (1981), Australia international & Sydney Roosters, wife of Michael

=== Yow Yeh family ===
Kevin is the first cousin of Jharal's grandfather, making them first cousins, twice removed.

- Kevin Yow Yeh (1941–1975), Redcliffe BRL and Balmain NSWRFL player
- Jharal Yow Yeh (born 1989), Australian international and Queensland Origin representative, Brisbane Broncos NRL player

== See also ==
- List of professional sports families
- List of family relations in American football
  - List of second-generation National Football League players
- List of association football (soccer) families
  - List of African association football families
  - List of European association football families
    - List of English association football families
    - List of former Yugoslavia association football families
    - List of Scottish football families
    - List of Spanish association football families
  - Category:Association football families
- List of Australian rules football families
- List of second-generation Major League Baseball players
- List of second-generation National Basketball Association players
- List of boxing families
- List of chess families
- List of International cricket families
- List of family relations in the National Hockey League
- List of international rugby union families
- List of professional wrestling families
