= 1956 NSWRFL season =

Rugby league competition

1956 New South Wales Rugby Football League
- Teams: 10
- Premiers: St. George (3rd title)
- Minor premiers: St. George (3rd title)
- Matches played: 95
- Points scored: 3096
- Top points scorer: Doug Fleming (189)
- Wooden spoon: Parramatta (4th spoon)
- Top try-scorer: Tommy Ryan (19)

1956's New South Wales Rugby Football League premiership was the 49th season of the rugby league competition based in Sydney. Ten teams from across the city competed for the J. J. Giltinan Shield during the season, which culminated in a Grand Final between St. George and Balmain.

== Season summary ==
=== Teams ===
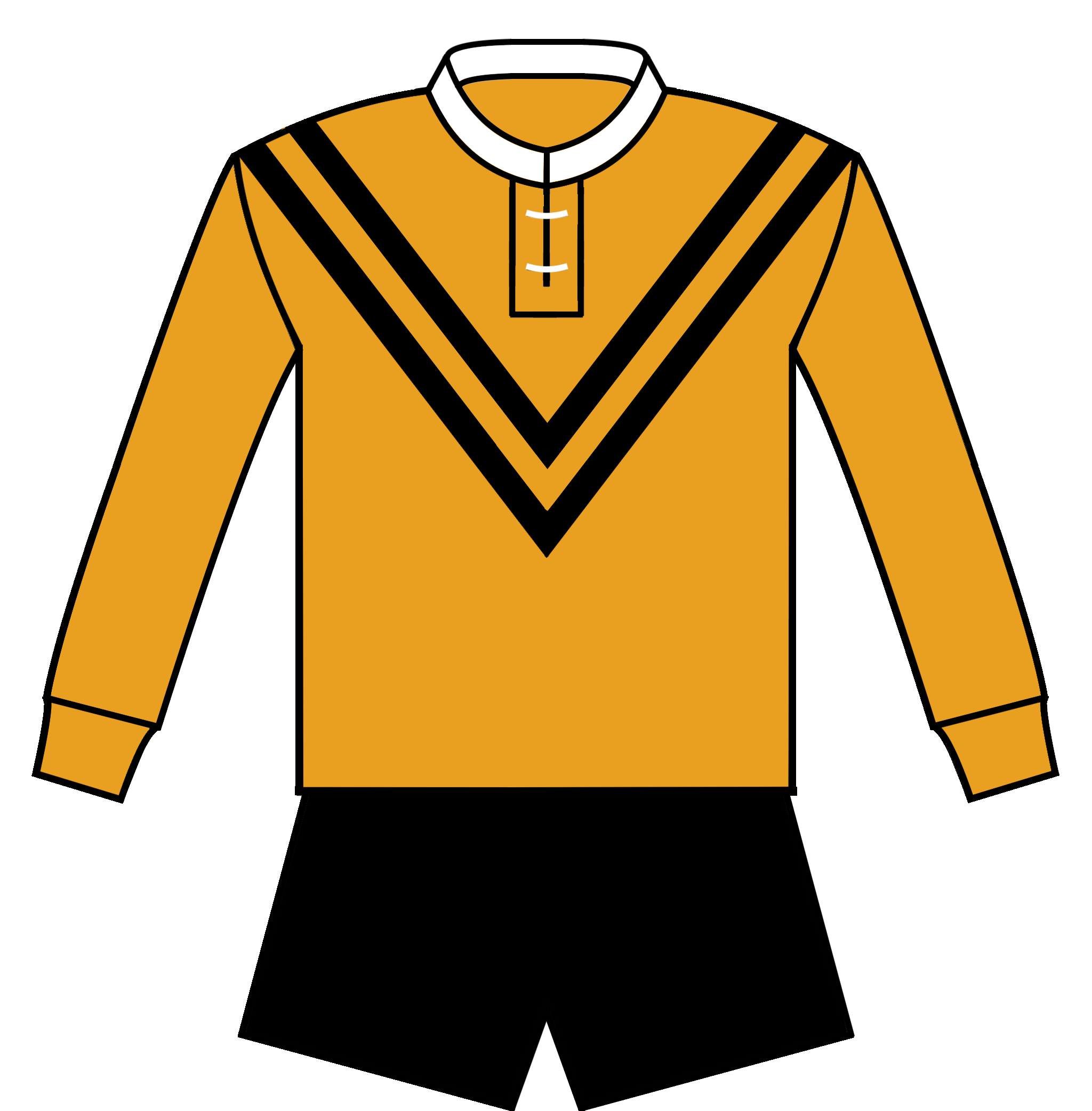
Balmain 49th season Ground: Leichhardt Oval; Coach: Norman Robinson; Captain: Brian Staunton

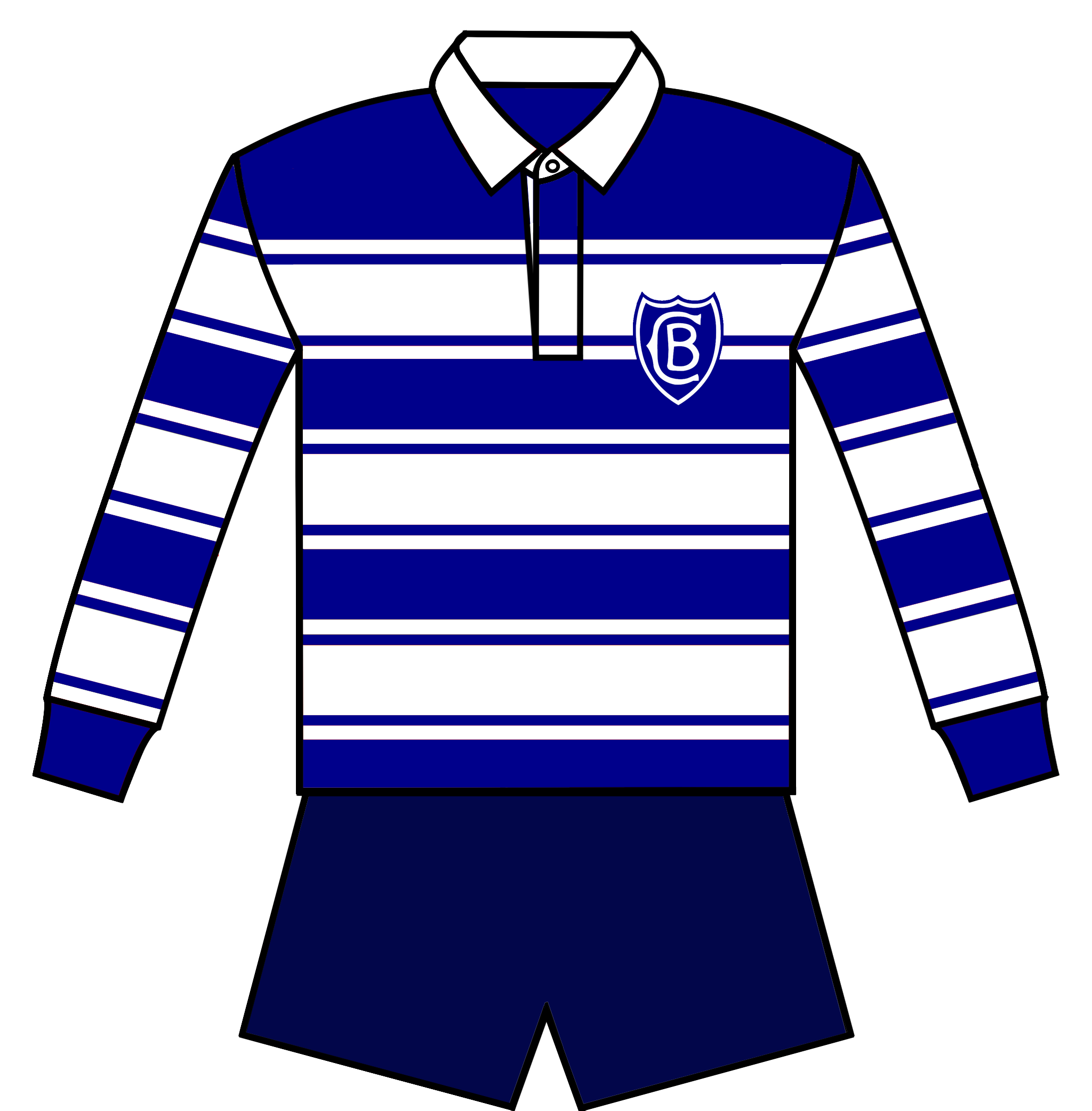
Canterbury-Bankstown 22nd season Ground: Belmore Oval; Coach: Vic Hey; Captain: Col Geelan

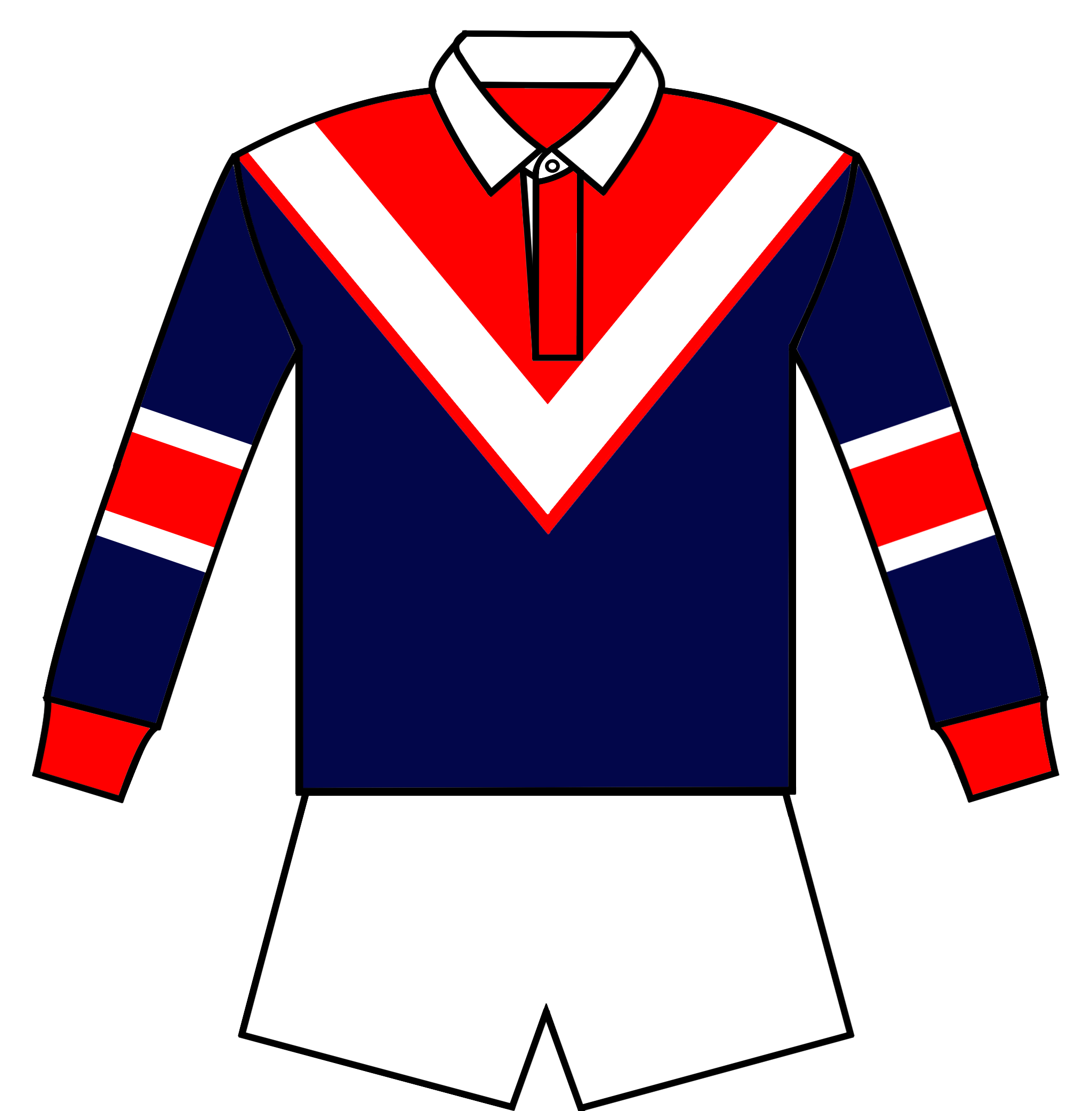
Eastern Suburbs 49th season Ground: Sydney Sports Ground; Coach: Frank O'Connor; Captain: Kevin Hansen

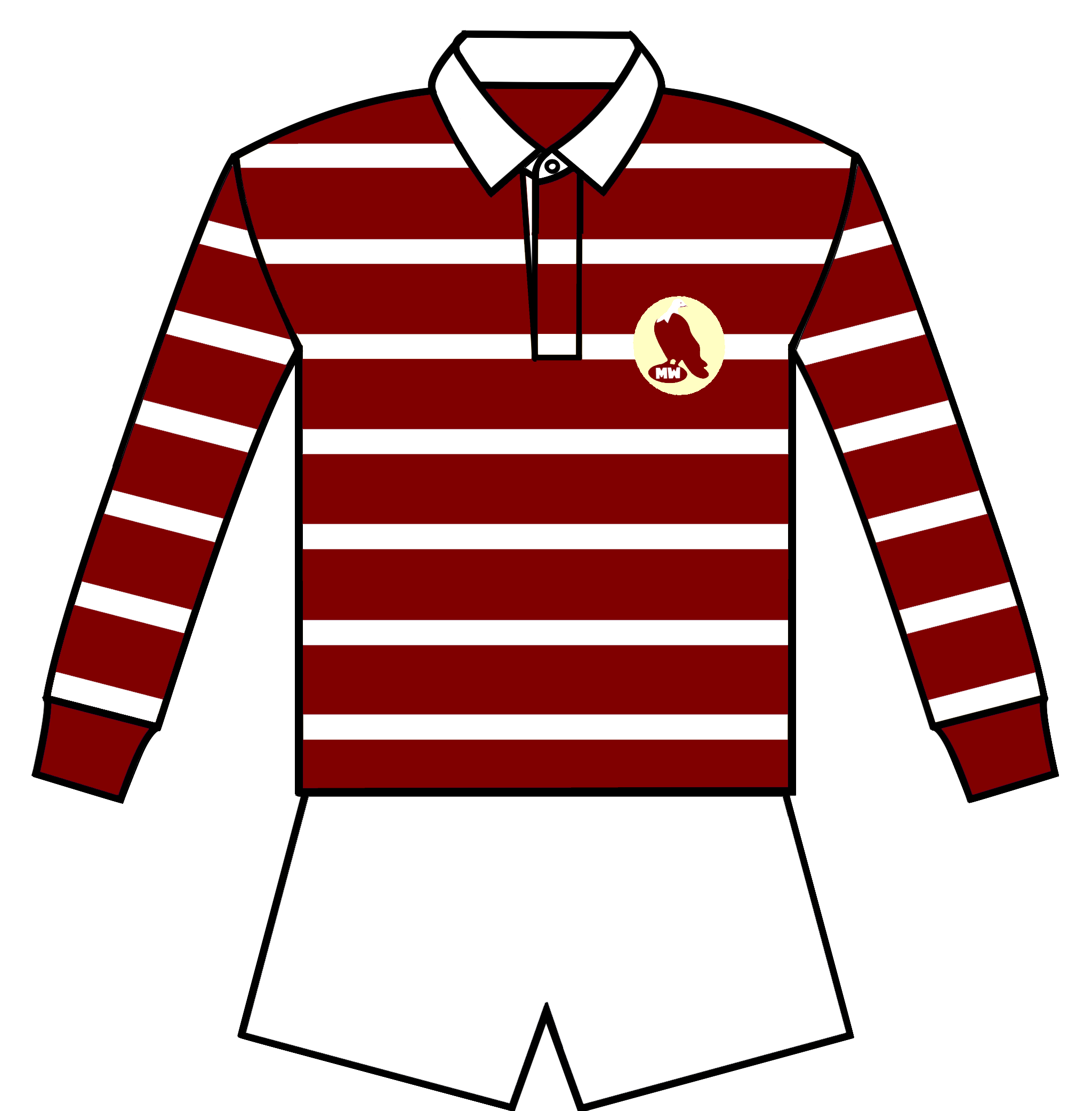
Manly-Warringah 10th season Ground: Brookvale Oval; Coach: Pat Devery; Captain: George Hunter

Newtown 49th season Ground: Henson Park; Captain-Coach: Dick Poole

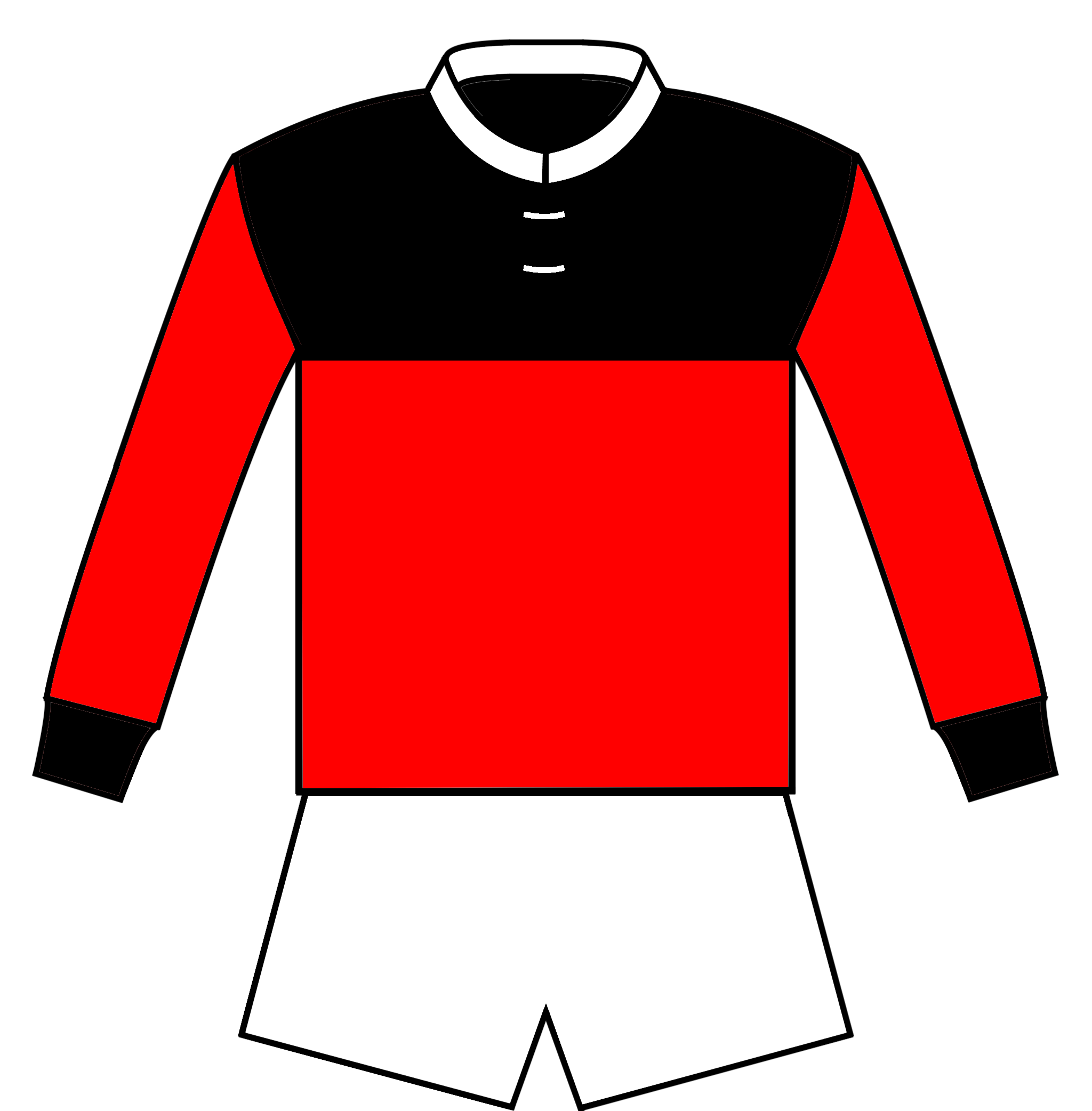
North Sydney 49th season Ground: North Sydney Oval; Coach: Bruce Ryan; Captain: Trevor Allan

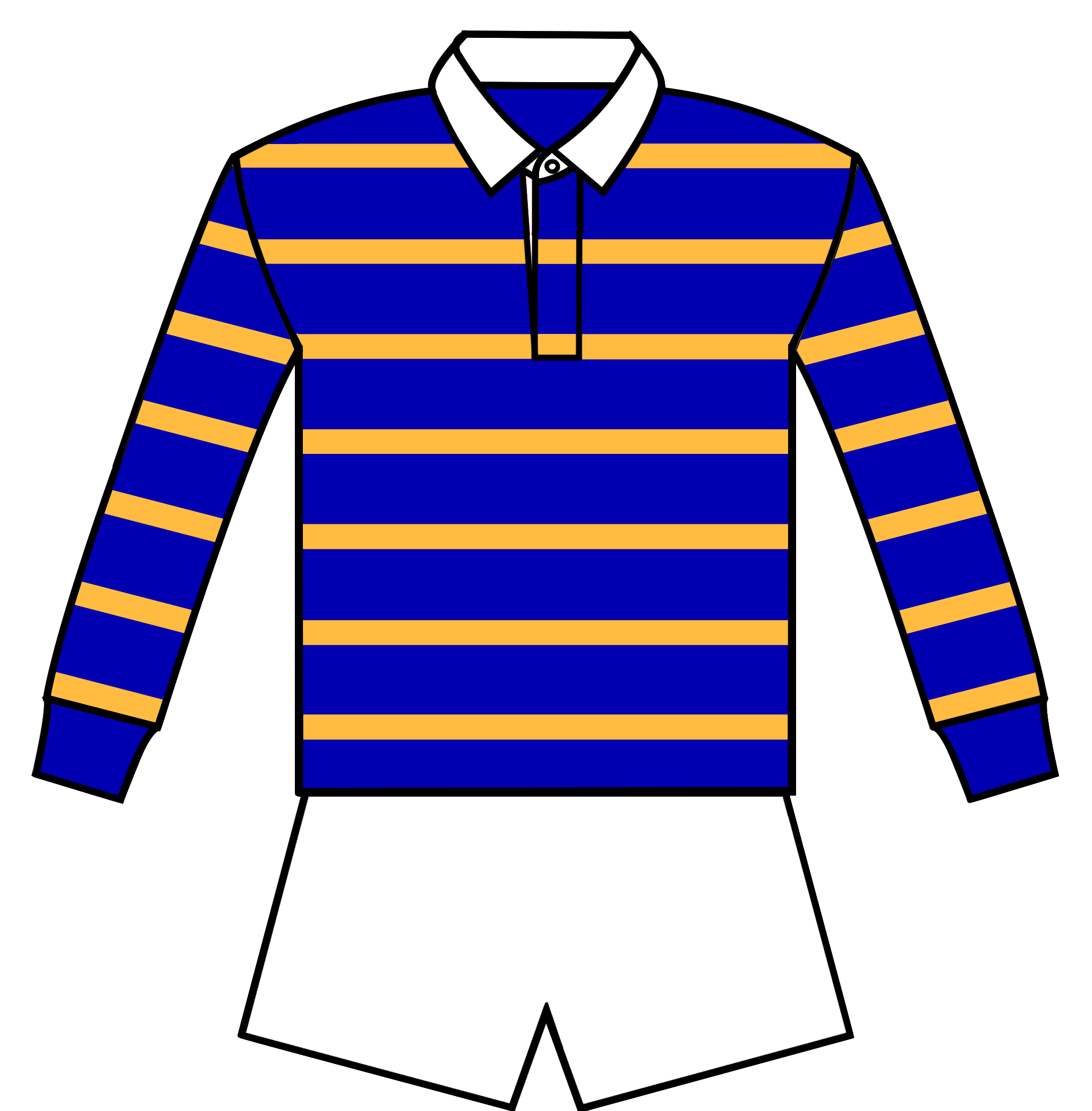
Parramatta 10th season Ground: Cumberland Oval; Coach: Cec Fifield; Captain: Graham Laird

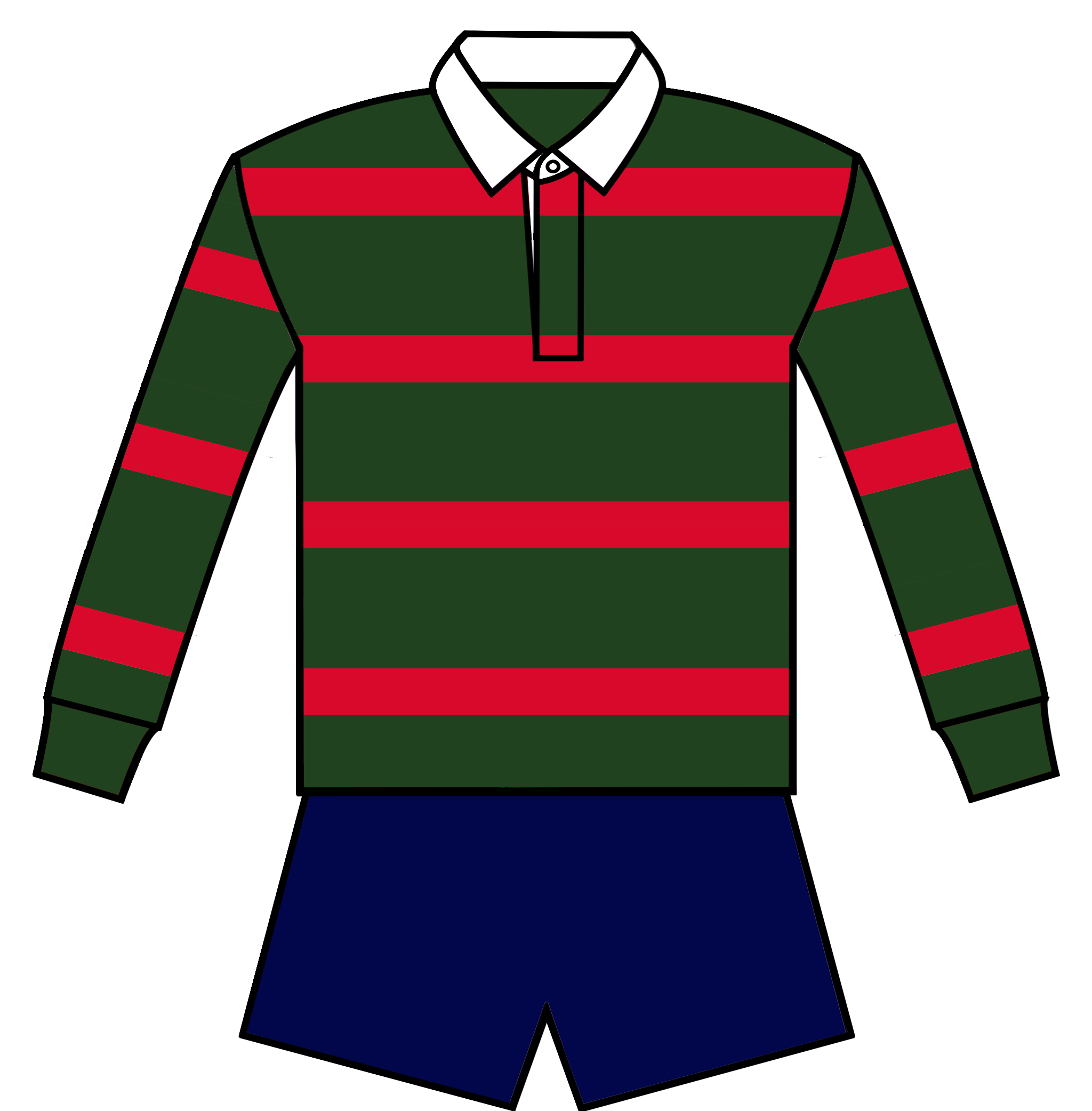
South Sydney 49th season Ground: Redfern Oval; Coach: Jack Rayner; Captain: Les Cowie

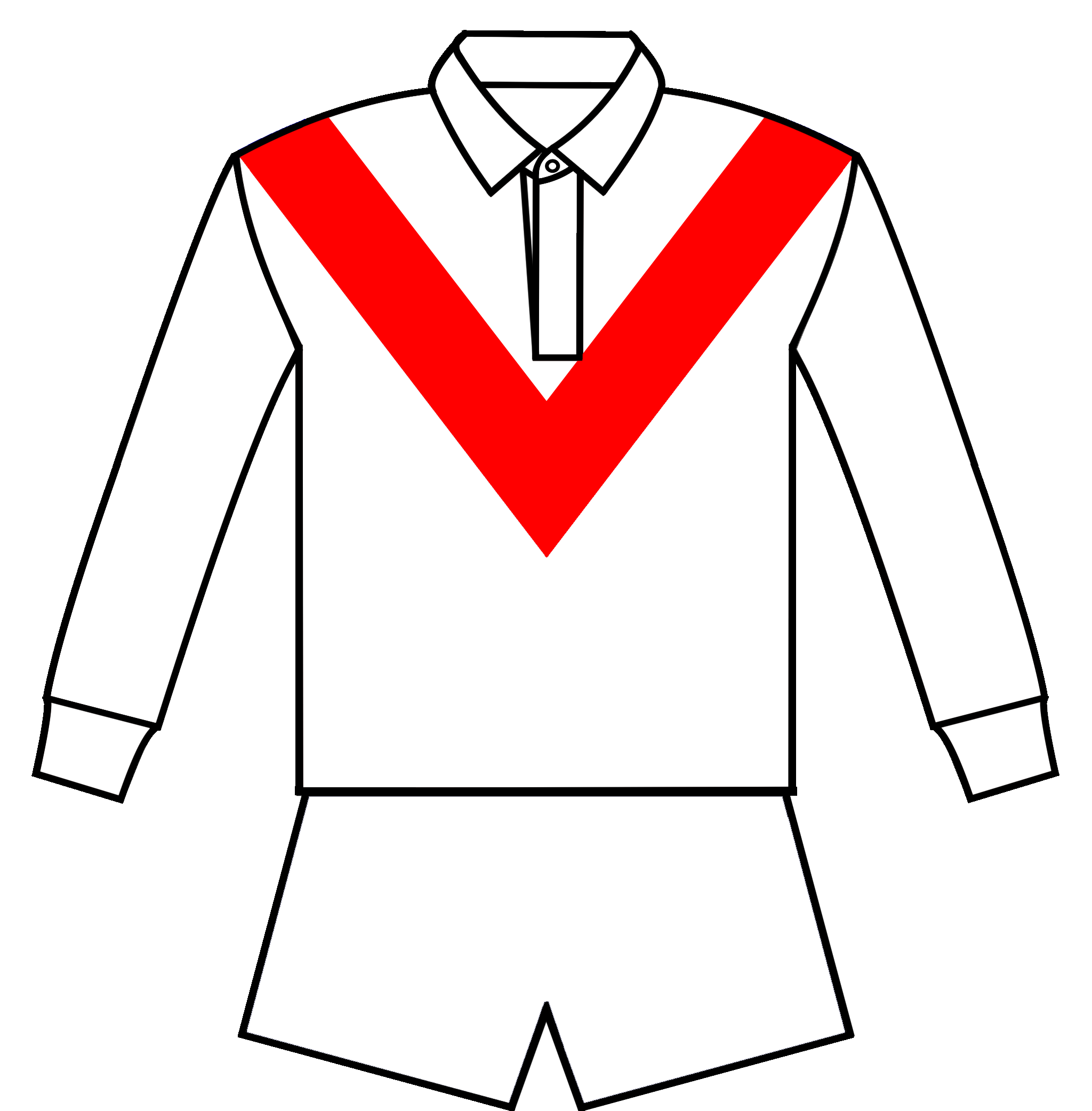
St. George 36th season Ground: Kogarah Oval; Coach: Norm Tipping; Captain: Ken Kearney

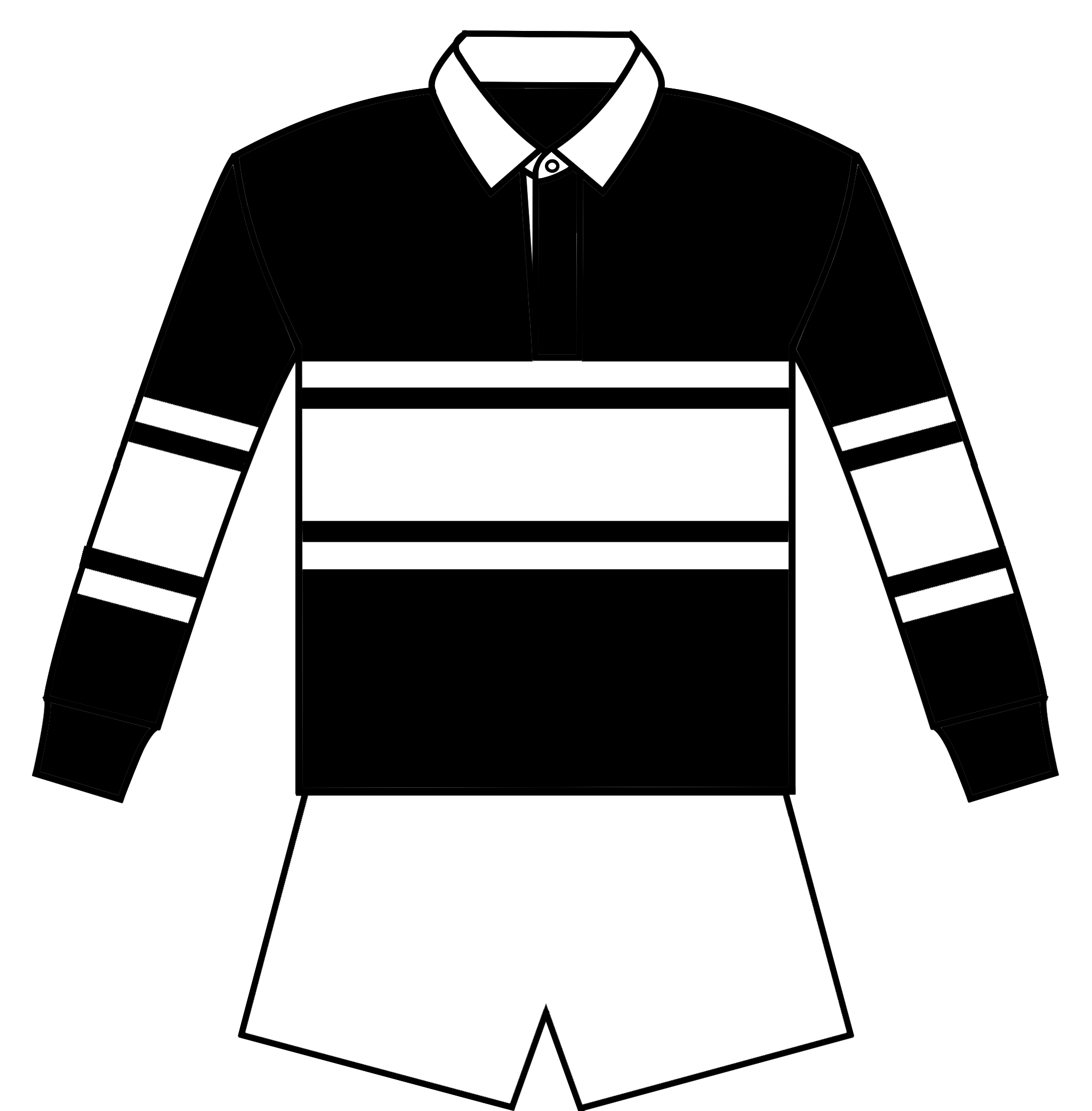
Western Suburbs 49th season Ground: Pratten Park; Coach: Jack Walsh; Captain: Keith Holman

== Regular season ==
Team	1	2	3	4	5	6	7	8	9	10	11	12	13	14	15	16	17	18	F1	F2	F3	F4	GF
Balmain	PAR +4	**CBY** **+27**	NOR +23	**NEW** **+4**	**EAS** **+13**	**WES** **+3**	SOU −35	**STG** **+11**	**MAN** **+6**	**PAR** **+4**	CBY +6	**NOR** **−1**	NEW −5	EAS +9	WES −14	**SOU** **+2**	**STG** **−14**	MAN +9	X	X	STG −5	**SOU** **+3**	STG −6
Canterbury-Bankstown	**WES** **−19**	BAL −27	STG −26	**MAN** **+3**	PAR −1	**SOU** **−5**	NOR +1	NEW −2	EAS −17	WES −14	**BAL** **−6**	**STG** **−19**	MAN −3	**PAR** **+18**	SOU +1	**NOR** **+1**	**NEW** **−10**	**EAS** **+8**					
Eastern Suburbs	NOR −5	NEW −26	SOU −24	WES +2	BAL −13	STG −36	MAN −15	**PAR** **+7**	**CBY** **+17**	**NOR** **+8**	**NEW** **−8**	**SOU** **−6**	**WES** **−19**	**BAL** **−9**	**STG** **−9**	**MAN**; **0**	PAR +1	CBY −8					
Manly-Warringah	STG −3	**SOU** **−5**	**PAR** **+22**	CBY −3	NOR +33	NEW −25	**EAS** **+15**	**WES** **+10**	BAL −6	**STG**; **0**	SOU −4	PAR +23	**CBY** **+3**	**NOR**; **0**	**NEW** **+8**	EAS; 0	WES −5	**BAL** **−9**					
Newtown	SOU −5	**EAS** **+26**	WES +9	BAL −4	**STG** **+10**	**MAN** **+25**	**PAR** **+28**	**CBY** **+2**	NOR +22	**SOU** **+13**	EAS +8	**WES** **−8**	**BAL** **+5**	**STG** **−24**	MAN −8	PAR −4	CBY +10	**NOR** **−1**	**WES** **−5**				
North Sydney	**EAS** **+5**	WES −1	**BAL** **−23**	STG −4	**MAN** **−33**	PAR −4	**CBY** **−1**	SOU −8	**NEW** **−22**	EAS −8	**WES** **+10**	BAL +1	**STG** **−12**	MAN; 0	**PAR** **+7**	CBY −1	**SOU** **−13**	NEW +1					
Parramatta	**BAL** **−4**	**STG** **−20**	MAN −22	**SOU** **+3**	**CBY** **+1**	**NOR** **+4**	NEW −28	EAS −7	WES −23	BAL −4	STG −11	**MAN** **−23**	SOU; 0	CBY −18	NOR −7	**NEW** **+4**	**EAS** **−1**	**WES** **−1**					
South Sydney	**NEW** **+5**	MAN +5	**EAS** **+24**	PAR −3	WES +3	CBY +5	**BAL** **+35**	**NOR** **+8**	**STG** **+22**	NEW −13	**MAN** **+4**	EAS +6	**PAR**; **0**	**WES** **−9**	**CBY** **−1**	BAL −2	NOR +13	**STG** **−3**	X	**WES** **+38**	X	BAL −3	
St. George	**MAN** **+3**	PAR +20	**CBY** **+26**	**NOR** **+4**	NEW −10	**EAS** **+36**	**WES** **+27**	BAL −11	SOU −22	MAN; 0	**PAR** **+11**	CBY +19	NOR +12	NEW +24	EAS +9	WES −6	BAL +14	SOU +3	X	X	**BAL** **+5**	X	**BAL** **+6**
Western Suburbs	CBY +19	**NOR** **+1**	**NEW** **−9**	**EAS** **−2**	**SOU** **−3**	BAL −3	STG −27	MAN −10	**PAR** **+23**	**CBY** **+14**	NOR −10	NEW +8	EAS +19	SOU +9	**BAL** **+14**	**STG** **+6**	**MAN** **+5**	PAR +1	NEW +5	SOU −38			
Team	1	2	3	4	5	6	7	8	9	10	11	12	13	14	15	16	17	18	F1	F2	F3	F4	GF

Bold – Home game
X – Bye
Opponent for round listed above margin

=== Ladder ===
	Team	Pld	W	D	L	PF	PA	PD	Pts
1	St. George	18	13	1	4	398	239	+159	27
2	Balmain	18	13	0	5	293	241	+52	26
3	South Sydney	18	11	1	6	364	265	+99	23
4	Newtown	18	11	0	7	333	229	+104	22
5	Western Suburbs	18	11	0	7	276	221	+55	22
6	Manly	18	7	3	8	323	269	+54	17
7	Canterbury	18	6	0	12	235	352	-117	12
8	North Sydney	18	5	1	12	218	324	-106	11
9	Eastern Suburbs	18	5	1	12	211	354	-143	11
10	Parramatta	18	4	1	13	224	381	-157	9

=== Ladder progression ===
- Numbers highlighted in green indicate that the team finished the round inside the top 4.
- Numbers highlighted in blue indicates the team finished first on the ladder in that round.
- Numbers highlighted in red indicates the team finished last place on the ladder in that round.

	Team	1	2	3	4	5	6	7	8	9	10	11	12	13	14	15	16	17	18
1	St. George	2	4	6	8	8	10	12	12	12	13	15	17	19	21	23	23	25	27
2	Balmain	2	4	6	8	10	12	12	14	16	18	20	20	20	22	22	24	24	26
3	South Sydney	2	4	6	6	8	10	12	14	16	16	18	20	21	21	21	21	23	23
4	Newtown	0	2	4	4	6	8	10	12	14	16	18	18	20	20	20	20	22	22
5	Western Suburbs	2	4	4	4	4	4	4	4	6	8	8	10	12	14	16	18	20	22
6	Manly-Warringah	0	0	2	2	4	4	6	8	8	9	9	11	13	14	16	17	17	17
7	Canterbury-Bankstown	0	0	0	2	2	2	4	4	4	4	4	4	4	6	8	10	10	12
8	North Sydney	2	2	2	2	2	2	2	2	2	2	4	6	6	7	9	9	9	11
9	Eastern Suburbs	0	0	0	2	2	2	2	4	6	8	8	8	8	8	8	9	11	11
10	Parramatta	0	0	0	2	4	6	6	6	6	6	6	6	7	7	7	9	9	9

== Finals ==
Home	Score	Away	Match Information
Home	Score	Away	Date and Time	Venue	Referee	Crowd
Playoff
Newtown	5–10	Western Suburbs	14 August 1956	Redfern Oval		20,920
Semifinals
South Sydney	45–7	Western Suburbs	18 August 1956	Sydney Cricket Ground	Col Pearce	51,775
St. George	30–25	Balmain	25 August 1956	Sydney Cricket Ground	Col Pearce	37,339
Preliminary Final
Balmain	36–33	South Sydney	1 September 1956	Sydney Cricket Ground	Darcy Lawler	42,350
Grand Final
St. George	18–12	Balmain	8 September 1956	Sydney Cricket Ground	Darcy Lawler	61,987

=== Grand Final ===
St George	Position	Balmain
1. Doug Fleming	FB	1. Keith Barnes
2. Ross Kite	WG	2. Arthur Lorimer
3. Merv Lees	CE	3. Geoff Hawkey
4. Kevin O'Brien	CE	4. Kevin Mosman
5. Tommy Ryan	WG	5. Terry McGovern
6. Peter Carroll	FE	6. Bill Harris
7. Bob Bugden	HB	7. Brian Staunton (c)
13. Kevin Brown	PR	13. Jack Moon
12. Ken Kearney (c)	HK	12. Neville Watt
11. Bryan Orrock	PR	11. Robert Heaney
26.Harry Melville	SR	10. Ron "Jake" Moses
9. Norm Provan	SR	9. Ron Potter
10. Billy Wilson	LK	8. Gus Gray
Norm Tipping	Coach	Norman Robinson

Up and coming Balmain fullback Keith Barnes came into the game with confidence, having booted 17 goals in his previous two games. In the most recent of those contests, the preliminary final against South Sydney, Tigers half-back, playmaker and captain Brian Staunton had been flattened by a Clive Churchill stiffarm tackle and as a consequence was still out-of-sorts on grand final day.

St George centre Merv Lees cracked his collar bone in a tackle in the 13th minute and hardman prop Billy Wilson moved out from the pack to play in the centres in spite of being constrained himself with a knee ligament injury. Wilson tormented Hawkey and Mosman in both attack and defence and set up both his own wingers for a number of long dashes. He was later selected by his teammates as Man of the Match with Kevin Brown, Bob Bugden and Norm Provan also starring in the game.

The sides were evenly matched for the first 38 minutes before a backline move from a scrum saw Dragons winger Tommy Ryan draw Barnes and pass to prop Kevin Brown who had freed himself from the scrum to be present in support.

Tries to Bugden and Kevin O'Brien came quickly after the break with Harry Melville's final try for the Dragons 18 minutes into the second half putting the game out of the Tigers' reach. Staunton responded with his second try for Balmain late in the game.

Norm Tipping had coached the Dragons to an excellent season result of 15 wins, 4 losses and 1 draw but would be ousted regardless from the coaching job shortly after the grand final. He was the loser in a power struggle with Dragons on-field leader Ken Kearney who that year had captained Australia to a three Test whitewash of New Zealand, had captained New South Wales to state victory over Queensland, won the Sunday Telegraph's Player of the Year award and ultimately captained the Saints to a premiership. Kearney had lost the coaching role to Tipping at the end of the 1955 season. At the end of 1956 the St George committee chose to back Kearney's fine football brain and his advanced English-learned strategies on attack, defense and conditioning in choosing him as their captain-coach to go forward. In the process they laid the foundation for the Dragons' record-breaking premiership stranglehold.

St George 18 (Tries: O'Brien, Bugden, Brown, Melville. Goals: Fleming 3.)

Balmain 12 (Tries: Staunton 2. Goals: Barnes 3.)

== Player statistics ==
The following statistics are as of the conclusion of Round 18.

Top 5 point scorers

Points	Player	Tries	Goals	Field Goals
171	Doug Fleming	3	80	1
158	Ron Willey	2	76	0
140	Keith Barnes	0	70	0
122	John Kell	0	61	0
120	Alan Arkey	0	59	1

Top 5 try scorers

Tries	Player
16	Tommy Ryan
14	Kevin O'Brien
14	Kevin Considine
14	Ray Ritchie
13	Ray Preston

Top 5 goal scorers

Goals	Player
80	Doug Fleming
76	Ron Willey
70	Keith Barnes
61	John Kell
59	Alan Arkey
