= 1957 NSWRFL season =

Rugby league competition

1957 New South Wales Rugby Football League
- Teams: 10
- Premiers: St. George (4th title)
- Minor premiers: St. George (4th title)
- Matches played: 94
- Points scored: 3103
- Attendance: 1089273
- Top points scorer(s): Darcy Russell (169)
- Wooden spoon: Parramatta (5th spoon)
- Top try-scorer(s): Tommy Ryan (26)

1957's New South Wales Rugby Football League premiership was the 50th season of the rugby league competition based in Sydney. Ten teams from across the city competed for the J. J. Giltinan Shield during the season, which culminated in a grand final between St. George and Manly-Warringah.

== Season summary ==
=== Teams ===
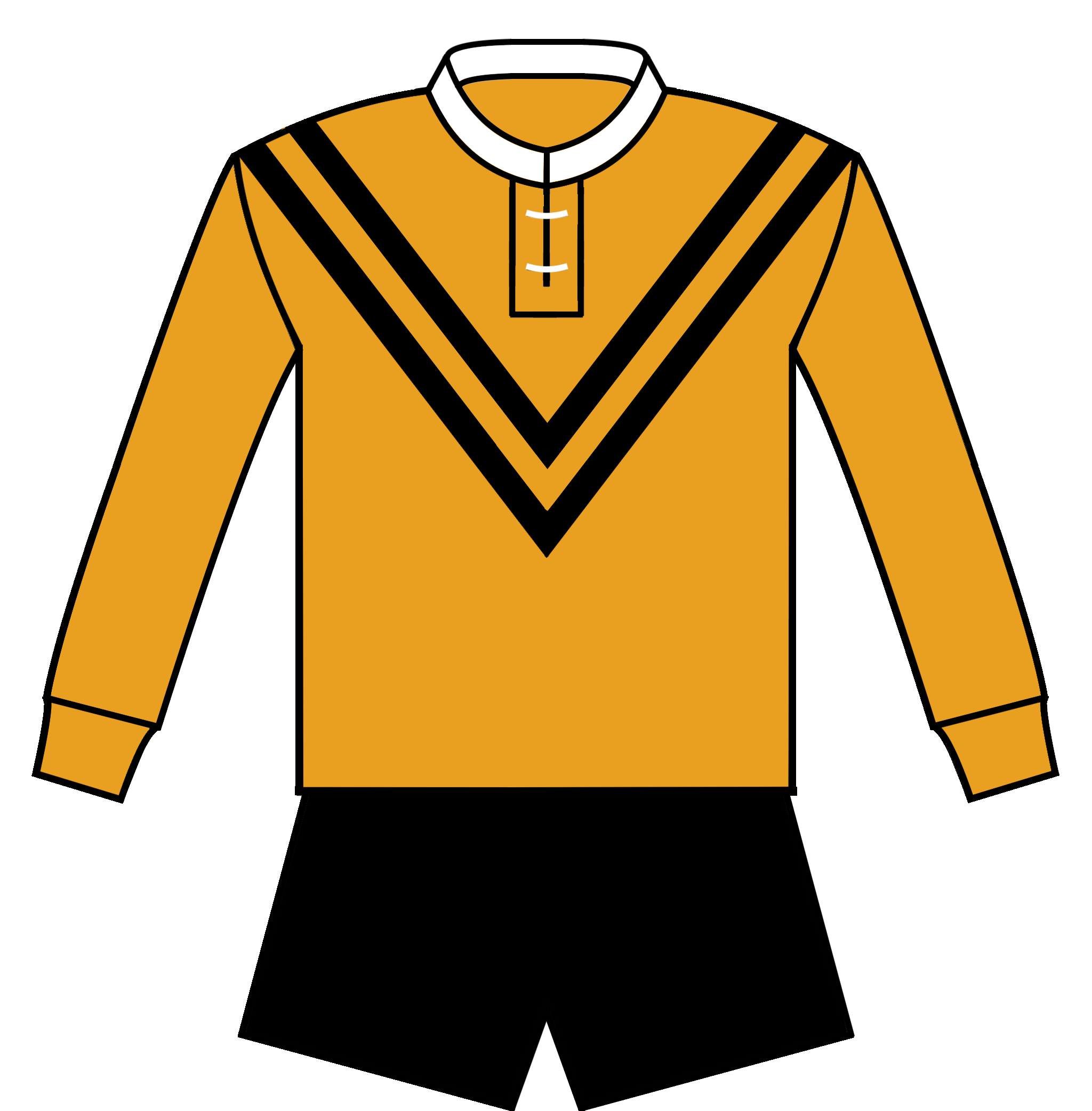
Balmain 50th season Ground: Leichhardt Oval; Coach: Sid Ryan; Captain: Brian Staunton

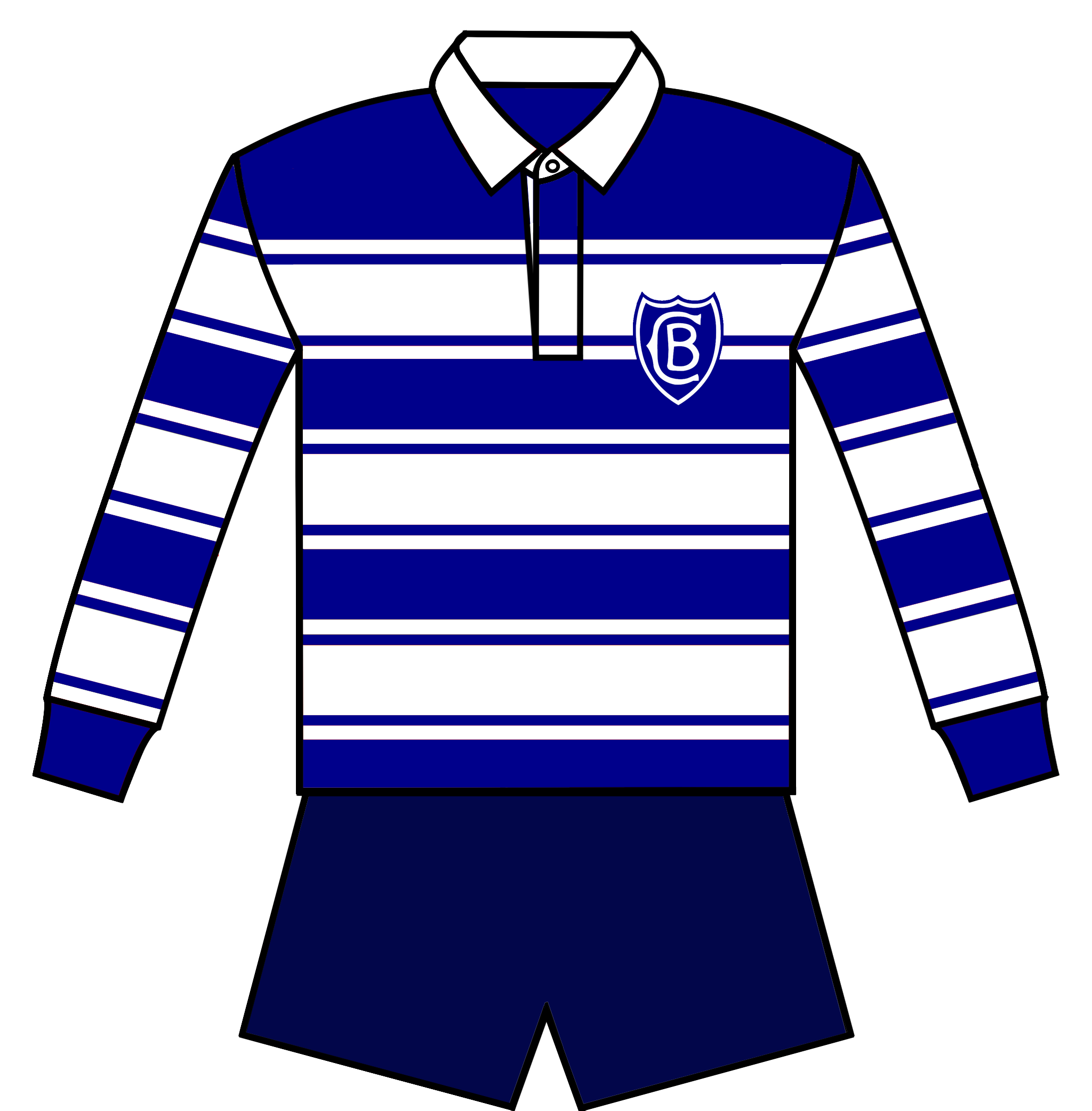
Canterbury-Bankstown season Ground: Belmore Oval; Captain-coach: Col Geelan

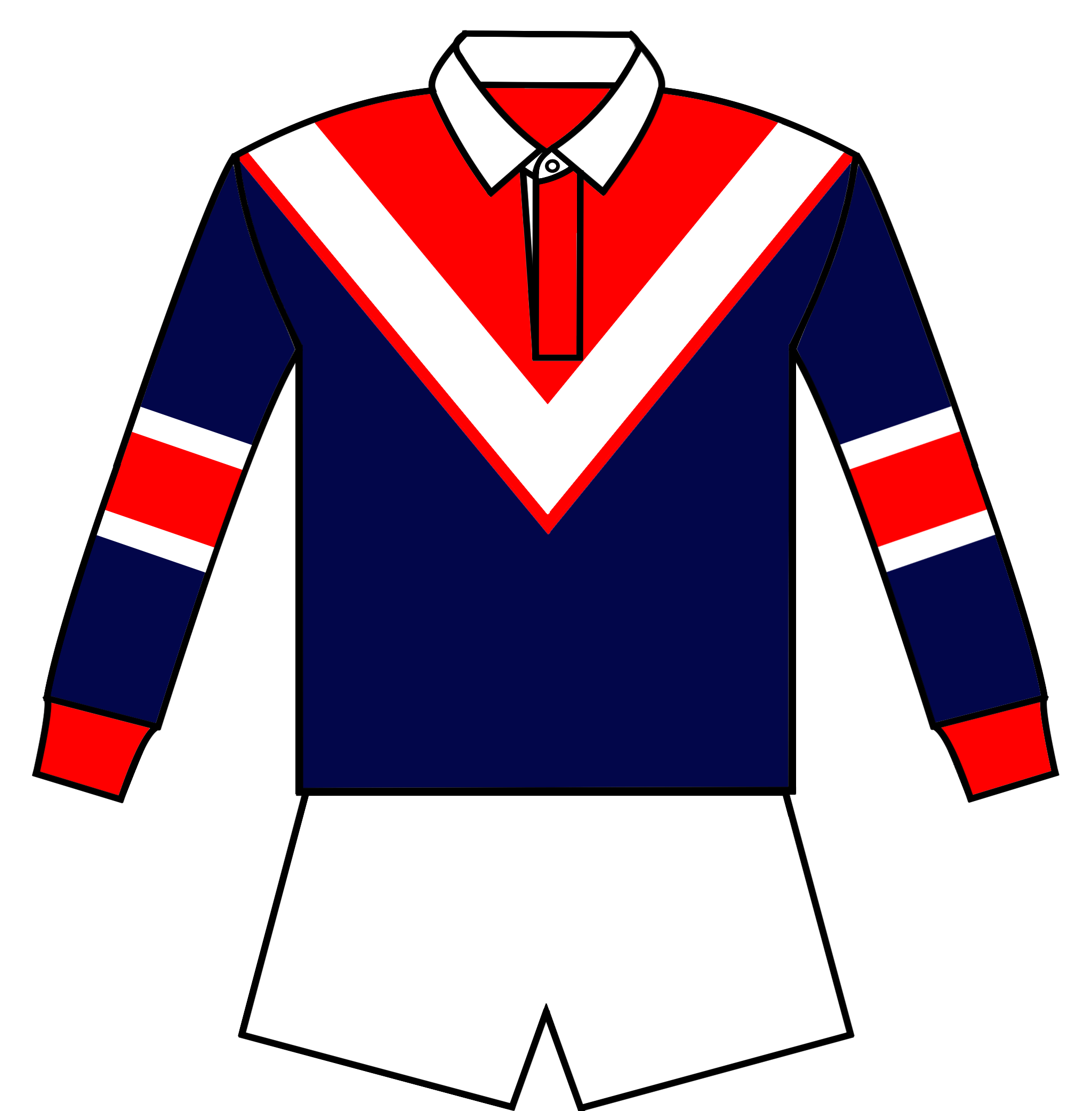
Eastern Suburbs 50th season Ground: Sydney Sports Ground; Coach: Dave Brown; Captain: Tony Paskins

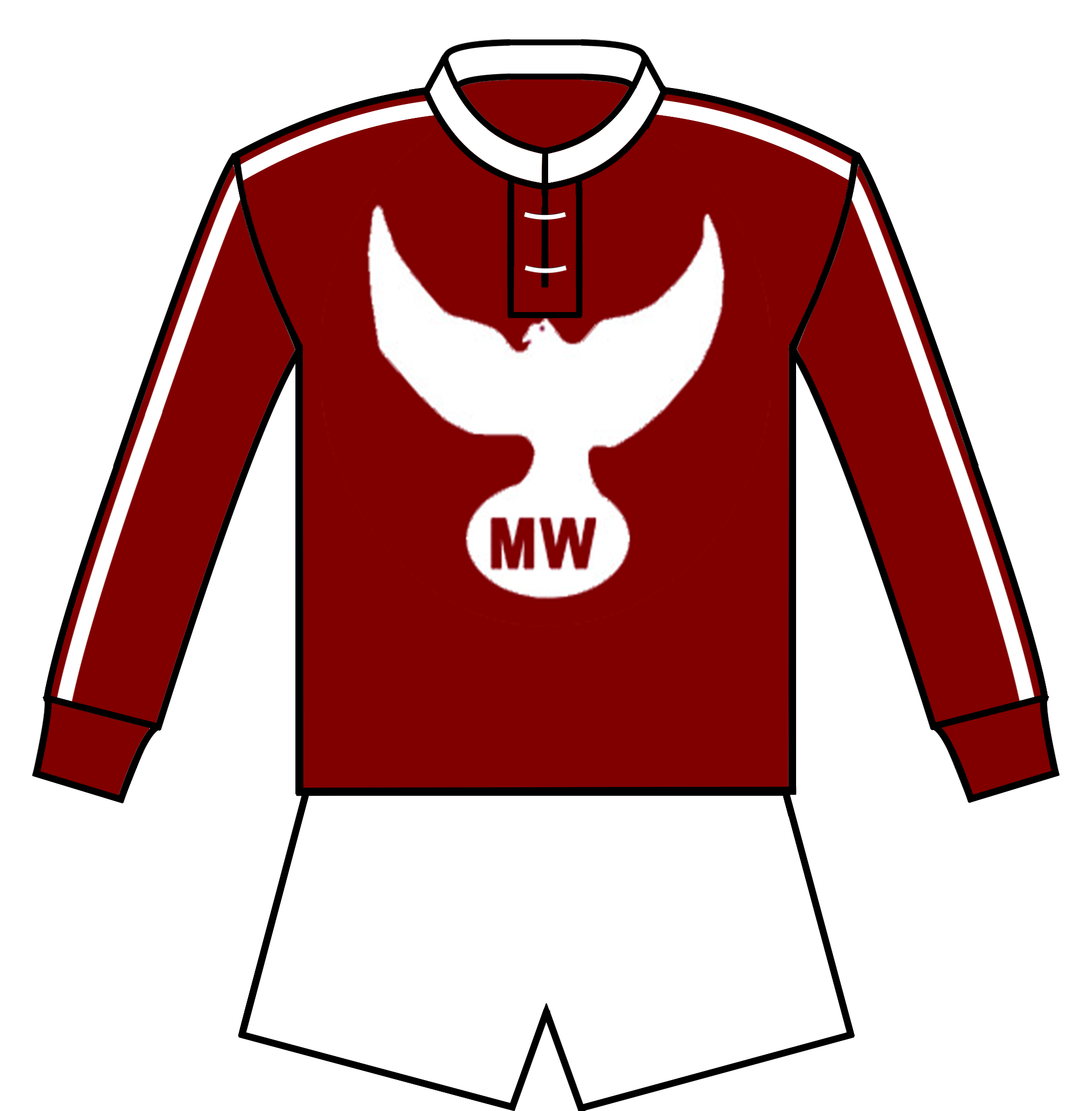
Manly-Warringah 11th season Ground: Brookvale Oval; Coach: Ken Arthurson; Captain: George Hunter

Newtown 50th season Ground: Henson Park; Captain-Coach: Dick Poole

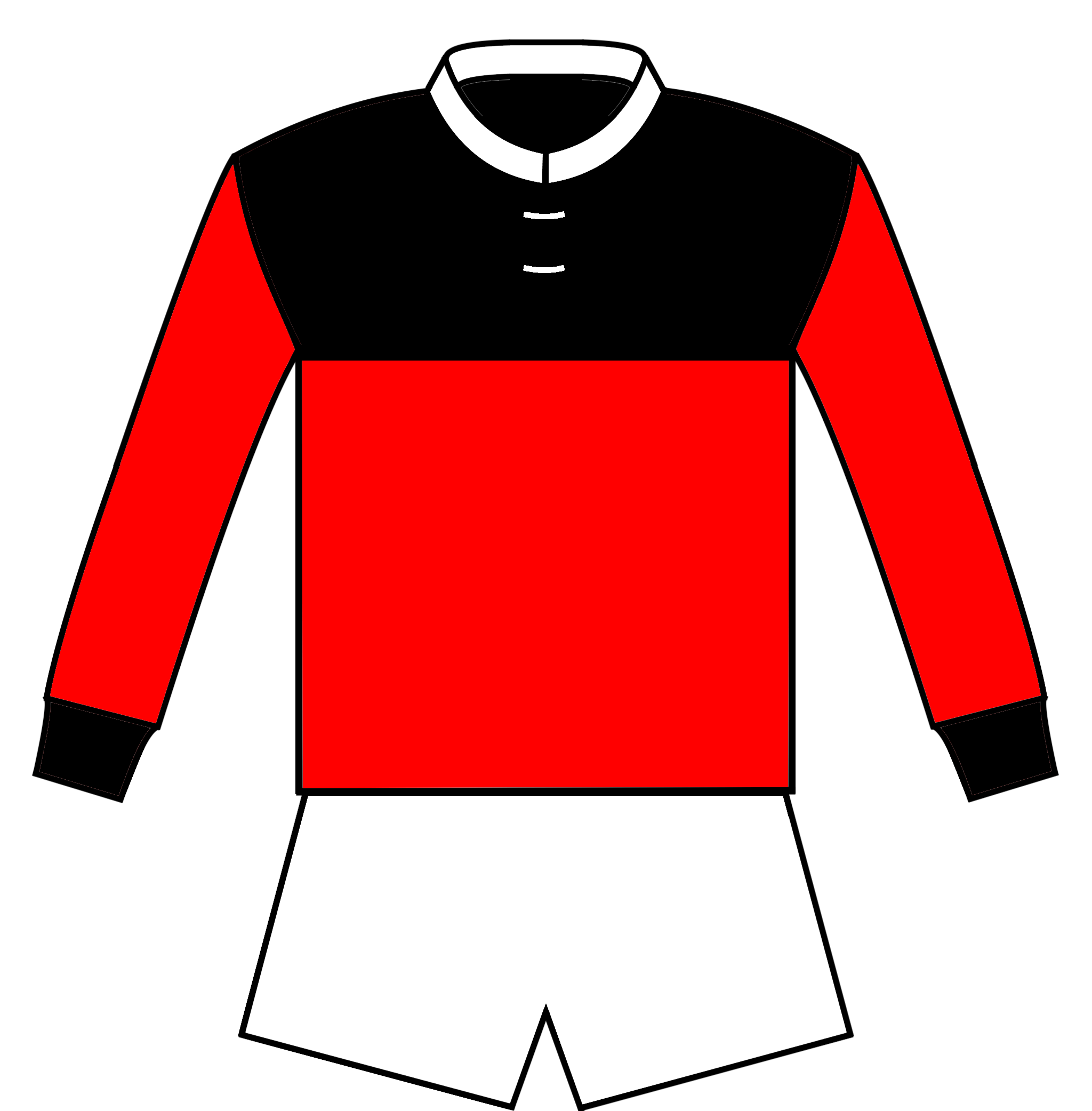
North Sydney 50th season Ground: North Sydney Oval; Coach: Trevor Allan; Captain: Ken McCaffery, Bob Dawson

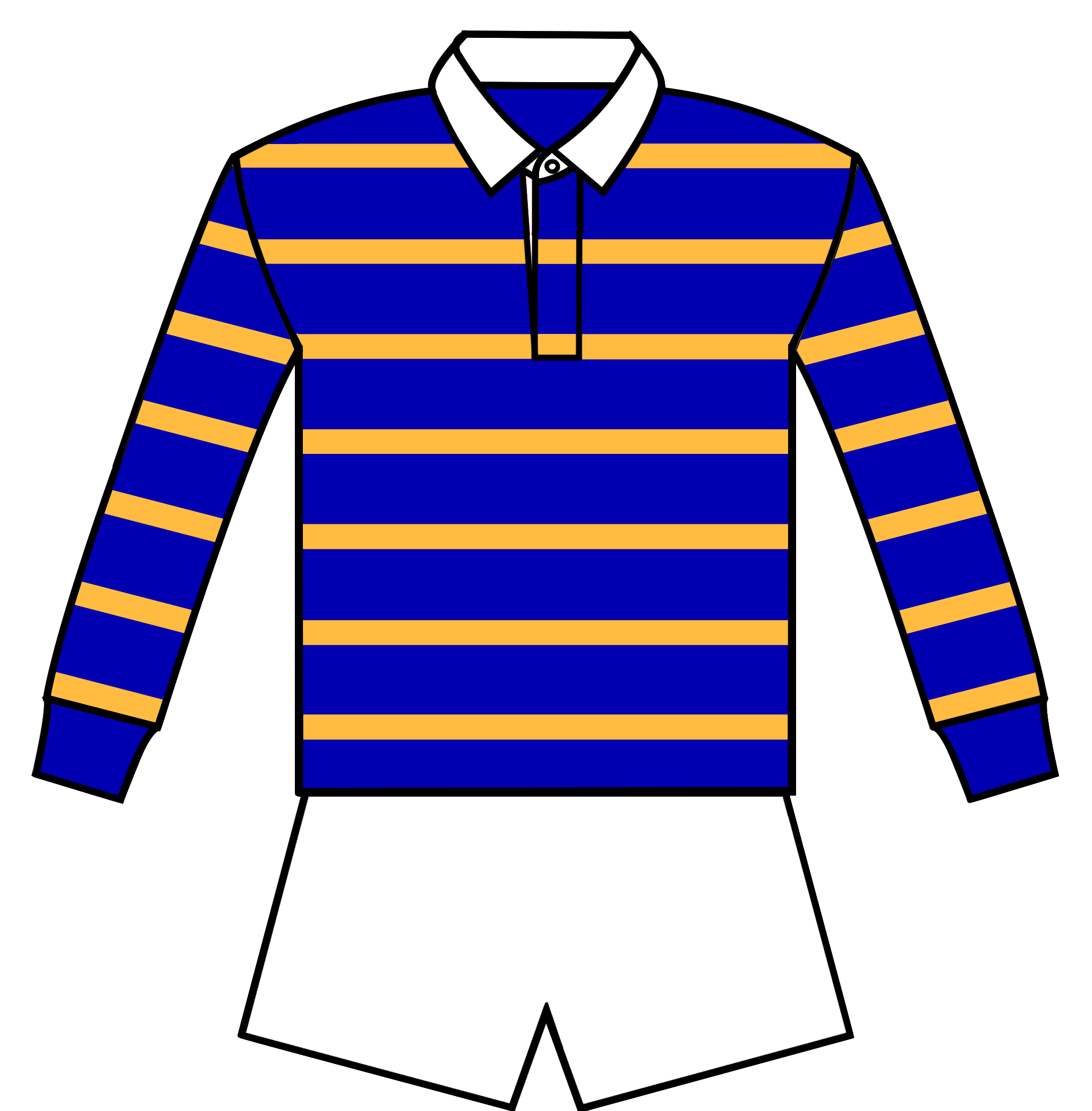
Parramatta 11th season Ground: Cumberland Oval; Captain-Coach: Ken Slattery

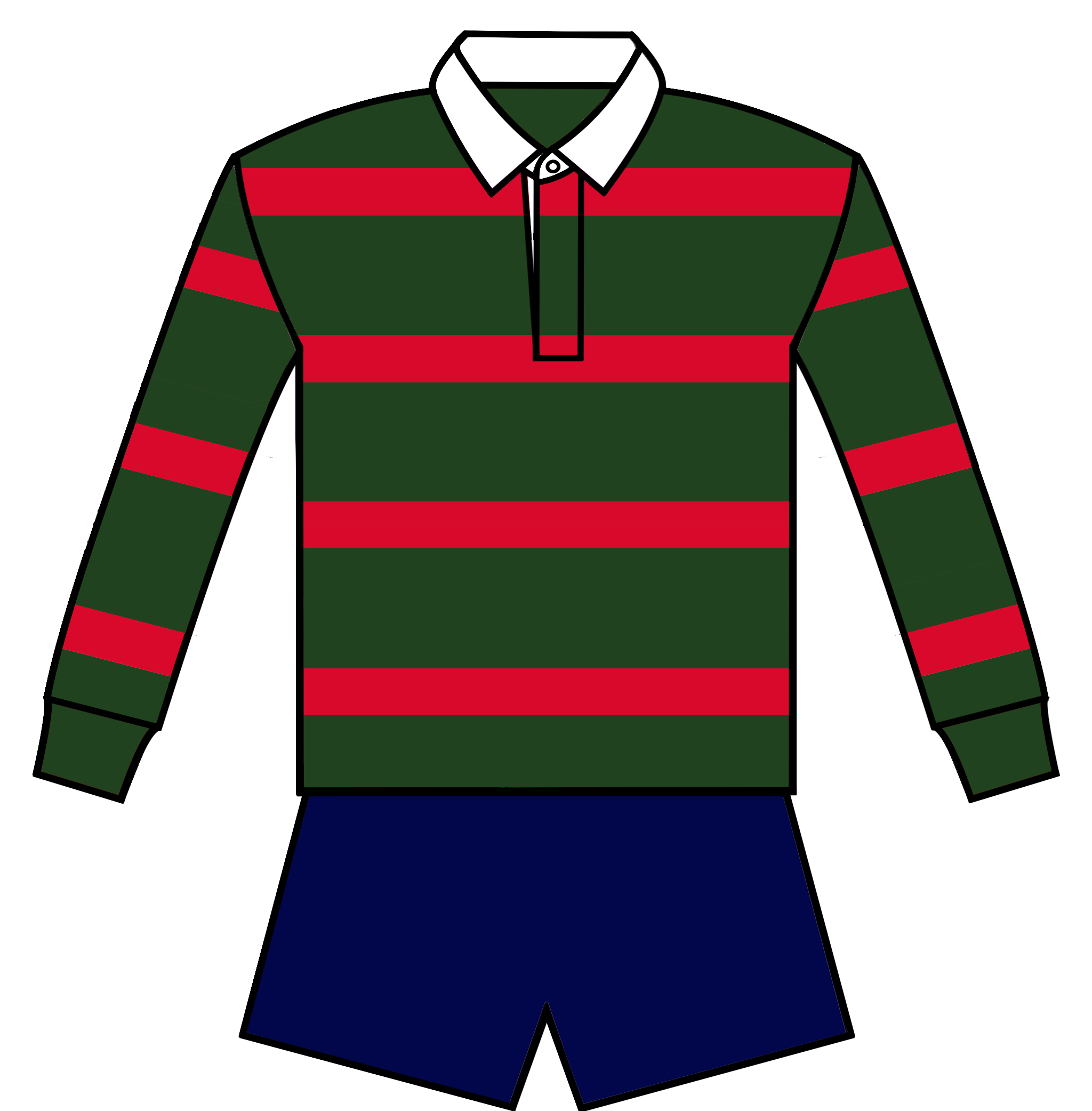
South Sydney 50th season Ground: Redfern Oval; Coach: Jack Rayner; Captain: Clive Churchill

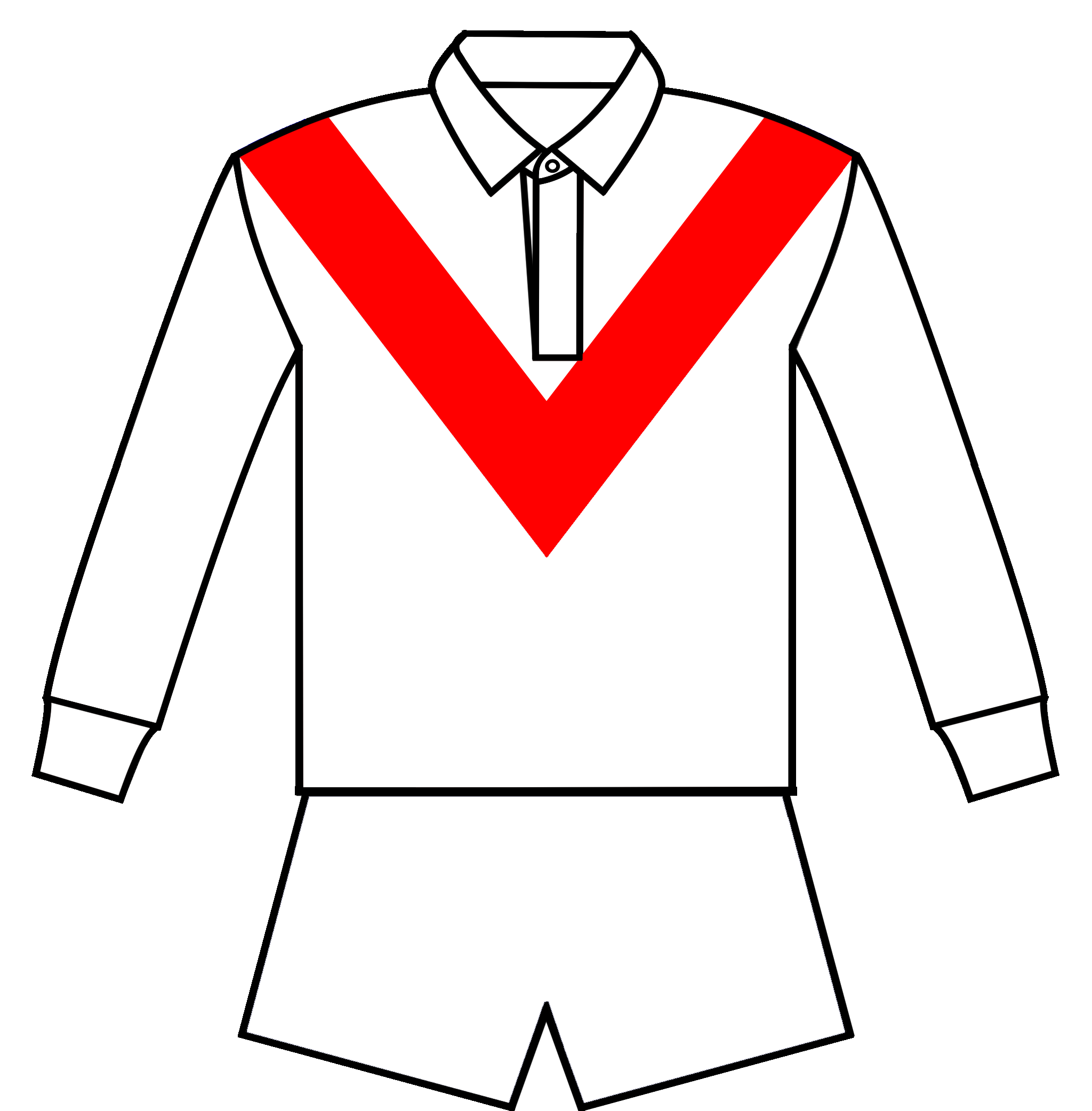
St. George 37th season Ground: Kogarah Oval; Captain-coach: Ken Kearney

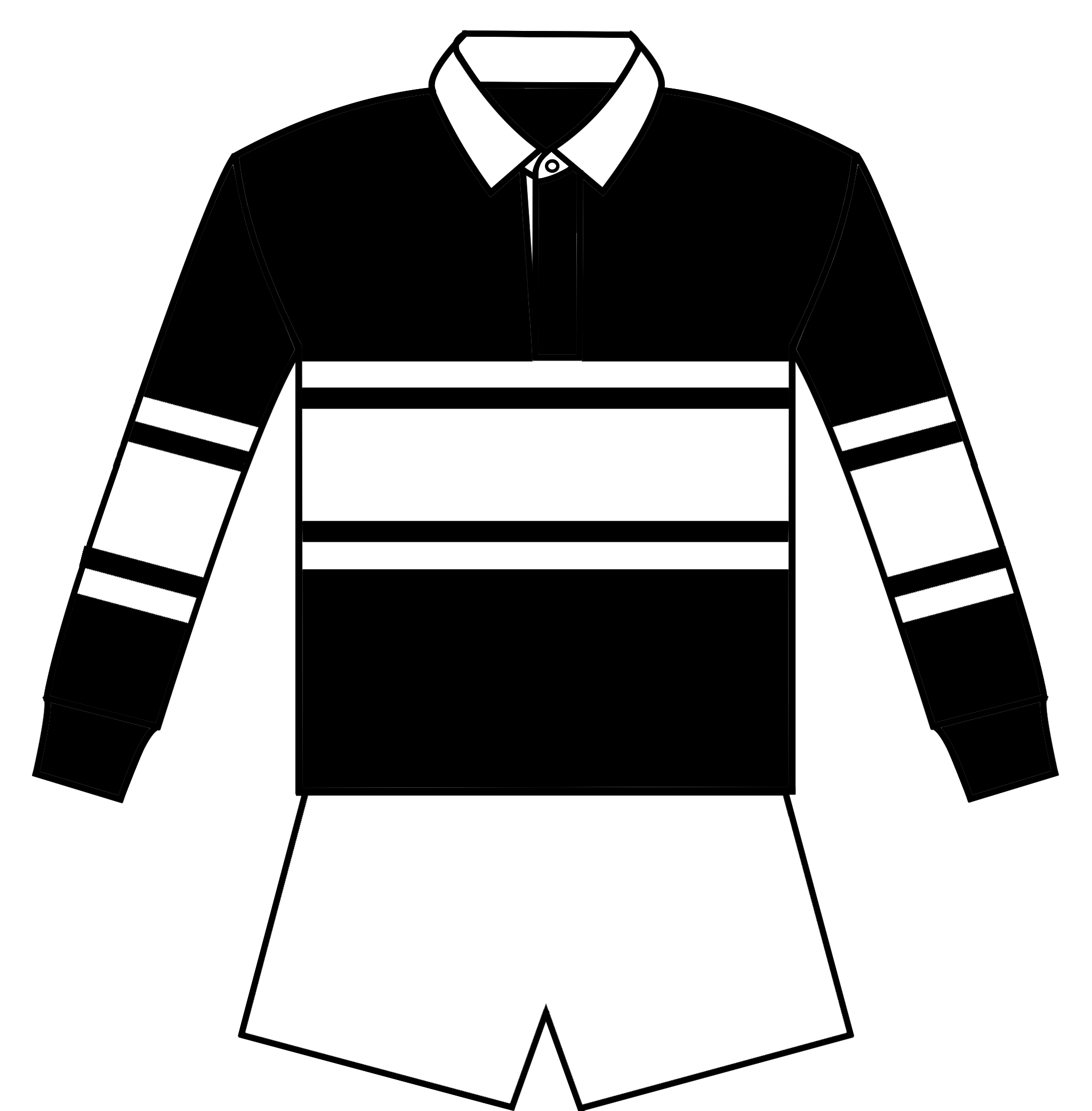
Western Suburbs 50th season Ground: Pratten Park; Coach: Jack Walsh; Captain: Keith Holman

== Regular season ==
Team	1	2	3	4	5	6	7	8	9	10	11	12	13	14	15	16	17	18	F1	F2	F3	GF
Balmain	**STG** **−6**	MAN −15	**PAR** **+24**	**CBY** **+2**	SOU +27	WES +14	**NOR** **−10**	EAS +14	**NEW** **+3**	**STG** **−6**	**MAN** **+16**	PAR +6	CBY −4	**SOU** **−2**	**WES** **−13**	NOR −7	**EAS** **+29**	NEW −1				
Canterbury-Bankstown	**NOR** **+3**	EAS −4	**NEW** **−15**	BAL −2	**MAN**; **0**	PAR −4	STG −37	SOU −13	**WES** **−1**	NOR −8	**EAS** **−12**	NEW −8	**BAL** **+4**	MAN −10	**PAR** **+7**	**STG** **−9**	**SOU** **−14**	WES −34				
Eastern Suburbs	PAR +5	**CBY** **+4**	**SOU** **+5**	WES −11	**NOR** **−8**	**STG** **−21**	NEW −19	**BAL** **−14**	MAN −27	**PAR** **+7**	CBY +12	SOU −2	**WES** **+4**	NOR +3	**STG** **+9**	**NEW** **+19**	BAL −29	**MAN** **−7**				
Manly-Warringah	NEW +11	**BAL** **+15**	STG −23	PAR +7	CBY; 0	**SOU** **−13**	**WES** **+6**	NOR +21	**EAS** **+27**	**NEW** **+9**	BAL −16	STG −3	**PAR** **+21**	**CBY** **+10**	SOU −9	WES +5	**NOR** **−2**	EAS +7	X	STG −14	**SOU** **+4**	STG −22
Newtown	**MAN** **−11**	PAR +35	CBY +15	**SOU** **+6**	**WES** **+8**	NOR −10	**EAS** **+19**	**STG** **−3**	BAL −3	MAN −9	**PAR** **−14**	**CBY** **+8**	SOU +24	WES −8	**NOR** **+6**	EAS −19	STG −6	**BAL** **+1**				
North Sydney	CBY −3	**SOU** **+8**	**WES**; **0**	**STG** **−12**	EAS +8	**NEW** **+10**	BAL +10	**MAN** **−21**	**PAR** **+15**	**CBY** **+8**	SOU −1	WES −6	STG −30	**EAS** **−3**	NEW −6	**BAL** **+7**	MAN +2	PAR +28				
Parramatta	**EAS** **−5**	**NEW** **−35**	BAL −24	**MAN** **−7**	STG −39	**CBY** **+4**	SOU −40	**WES** **−7**	NOR −15	EAS −7	NEW +14	**BAL** **−6**	MAN −21	**STG** **−23**	CBY −7	**SOU** **−36**	WES −20	**NOR** **−28**				
South Sydney	WES −40	NOR −8	EAS −5	NEW −6	**BAL** **−27**	MAN +13	**PAR** **+40**	**CBY** **+13**	**STG** **+22**	**WES** **+6**	**NOR** **+1**	**EAS** **+2**	**NEW** **−24**	BAL +2	**MAN** **+9**	PAR +36	CBY +14	**STG** **−8**	**WES** **+13**	X	MAN −4	
St. George	BAL +6	WES −18	**MAN** **+23**	NOR +12	**PAR** **+39**	EAS +21	**CBY** **+37**	NEW +3	SOU −22	BAL +6	**WES** **+8**	**MAN** **+3**	**NOR** **+30**	PAR +23	EAS −9	CBY +9	**NEW** **+6**	SOU +8	X	**MAN** **+14**	X	**MAN** **+22**
Western Suburbs	**SOU** **+40**	**STG** **+18**	NOR; 0	**EAS** **+11**	NEW −8	**BAL** **−14**	MAN −6	PAR +7	CBY +1	SOU −6	STG −8	**NOR** **+6**	EAS −4	**NEW** **+8**	BAL +13	**MAN** **−5**	**PAR** **+20**	**CBY** **+34**	SOU −13			
Team	1	2	3	4	5	6	7	8	9	10	11	12	13	14	15	16	17	18	F1	F2	F3	GF

Bold – Home game
X – Bye
Opponent for round listed above margin

=== Ladder ===
	Team	Pld	W	D	L	PF	PA	PD	Pts
1	St. George	18	15	0	3	417	232	+185	30
2	Manly	18	11	1	6	282	209	+73	23
3	South Sydney	18	11	0	7	354	314	+40	22
4	Western Suburbs	18	10	1	7	358	251	+107	21
5	North Sydney	18	9	1	8	292	278	+14	19
6	Balmain	18	9	0	9	352	281	+71	18
7	Newtown	18	9	0	9	267	228	+39	18
8	Eastern Suburbs	18	9	0	9	277	347	-70	18
9	Canterbury	18	3	1	14	182	339	-157	7
10	Parramatta	18	2	0	16	189	491	-302	4

=== Ladder progression ===
- Numbers highlighted in green indicate that the team finished the round inside the top 4.
- Numbers highlighted in blue indicates the team finished first on the ladder in that round.
- Numbers highlighted in red indicates the team finished last place on the ladder in that round.

	Team	1	2	3	4	5	6	7	8	9	10	11	12	13	14	15	16	17	18
1	St. George	2	2	4	6	8	10	12	14	14	16	18	20	22	24	24	26	28	30
2	Manly-Warringah	2	4	4	6	7	7	9	11	13	15	15	15	17	19	19	21	21	23
3	South Sydney	0	0	0	0	0	2	4	6	8	10	12	14	14	16	18	20	22	22
4	Western Suburbs	2	4	5	7	7	7	7	9	11	11	11	13	13	15	17	17	19	21
5	North Sydney	0	2	3	3	5	7	9	9	11	13	13	13	13	13	13	15	17	19
6	Balmain	0	0	2	4	6	8	8	10	12	12	14	16	16	16	16	16	18	18
7	Newtown	0	2	4	6	8	8	10	10	10	10	10	12	14	14	16	16	16	18
8	Eastern Suburbs	2	4	6	6	6	6	6	6	6	8	10	10	12	14	16	18	18	18
9	Canterbury-Bankstown	2	2	2	2	3	3	3	3	3	3	3	3	5	5	7	7	7	7
10	Parramatta	0	0	0	0	0	2	2	2	2	2	4	4	4	4	4	4	4	4

== Finals ==
Home	Score	Away	Match Information
Home	Score	Away	Date and Time	Venue	Referee	Crowd
Semifinals
South Sydney	26–13	Western Suburbs	31 August 1957	Sydney Cricket Ground	Darcy Lawler	46,957
St. George	21–7	Manly-Warringah	7 September 1957	Sydney Cricket Ground	Darcy Lawler	39,845
Preliminary Final
Manly-Warringah Sea Eagles	15–11	South Sydney	14 September 1957	Sydney Cricket Ground	Darcy Lawler	39,065
Grand Final
St. George	31–9	Manly-Warringah Sea Eagles	21 September 1957	Sydney Cricket Ground	Darcy Lawler	54,399

=== Grand Final ===
St. George	Position	Manly-Warringah Sea Eagles
26. Brian Graham	FB	1. Ron Willey
11. Tommy Ryan	WG	2. Ray Ritchie
41. Ray Smith	CE	4. Ray Quinnell
23. Jack Fifield	CE	17. Bill Lloyd
25. Eddie Lumsden	WG	5. George Hugo
8. Peter Carroll	FE	33. Kevin Diett
7. Bob Bugden	HB	7. Peter Burke
1. Kevin Brown	PR	13. Roy Bull
2. Ken Kearney (Ca./Co.)	HK	12. George Lenon
14. Bryan Orrock	PR	11. Denis Meaney
3. Harry Bath	SR	10. Doug Daley
5. Norm Provan	SR	9. Rex Mossop
6. Brian Clay	LK	8. George Hunter (c)
	Coach	Ken Arthurson

Under 27 year-old coach Ken Arthurson, Manly were playing in their second grand final. The match began with Saints pounding the (then called) 'Seagulls' with some heavy tackling. Brian Clay in particular targeted Manly's Rex Mossop, often trapping the dual international forward with the ball. “Poppa” Clay had a fearsome reputation in defence and at one point he knocked the Manly captain George Hunter senseless.

Manly were up to the task in the first half with the score locked at 4–4 for 30 minutes. Straight after half time, the flood gates opened following a magnificent run up the centre by second-row forward Norm Provan. He palmed off Manly defenders, ran deep into their territory, high stepped past fullback Ron Willey and slipped the ball to Poppa Clay who scored under the posts.

A second Dragon try followed within three minutes and the game began to slip away from the Manly side. The Larry Writer reference quotes Manly coach Arthurson: "The sheer physical strength of the St. George team is in itself a formidable thing to overcome. Our fellows tried everything, but St. George had so much more to give. Those big fellows are so clever."

Harry Bath kicked eight goals from eight attempts establishing a standing record for the most goals in a grand final and the most points scored in a grand final (16). His fellow ball playing forward and tactician Ken Kearney had returned for this, the first of five successful seasons as coach (four as captain-coach).

St. George 31 (Tries: Clay 2, Ryan, Fifield, Lumsden. Goals: Bath 8.)

Manly 9 (Tries: Burke. Goals: Willey 3.)

== Player statistics ==
The following statistics are as of the conclusion of Round 18.

Top 5 point scorers

Points	Player	Tries	Goals	Field Goals
165	Darcy Russell	3	78	0
142	Ron Willey	4	65	0
140	Alan Arkey	0	70	0
115	Fred Dunn	1	56	0
110	Doug Fleming	2	52	0

Top 5 try scorers

Tries	Player
24	Tommy Ryan
18	Eric Sladden
18	Des Horne
15	Eddie Lumsden
15	Ian Moir
15	Laurie McMahon

Top 5 goal scorers

Goals	Player
78	Darcy Russell
70	Alan Arkey
65	Ron Willey
56	Fred Dunn
52	Doug Fleming
