= List of Manly Warringah Sea Eagles coaches =

,There have been 24 coaches of the Manly Warringah Sea Eagles since their first season in 1947.

== List of Coaches ==
As of the round 12 of the 2026 NRL season

| No. | Name | Seasons | Games | Wins | Draws | Losses | Winning Percentage | Premiers | Runner-up | Minor Premierships |
|---|---|---|---|---|---|---|---|---|---|---|
| 1 | Harold Johnson | 1947 | 5 | 0 | 0 | 5 | 0% | – | – | – |
| 2 | Ray Stehr | 1947–1948 | 31 | 8 | 1 | 22 | 25.8% | – | – | – |
| 3 | George Mullins | 1949 | 18 | 6 | 1 | 11 | 33.3% | – | – | – |
| 4 | Wally O'Connell | 1950–1952*, 1966–1967 | 101 | 54 | 2 | 45 | 53.5% | – | 1951 | – |
| 5 | Roy Bull | 1953* | 18 | 6 | 0 | 12 | 33.3% | – | – | – |
| 6 | Ray Norman | 1954 | 18 | 10 | 1 | 7 | 55.6% | – | – | – |
| 7 | Pat Devery | 1955-1956 | 38 | 18 | 4 | 16 | 48.6% | – | – | – |
| 8 | Ken Arthurson | 1957–1961 | 98 | 56 | 2 | 40 | 57.1% | – | 1957, 1959 | – |
| 9 | Ron Willey | 1962, 1970–1974 | 139 | 97 | 4 | 38 | 69.8% | 1972, 1973 | 1970 | 1971, 1972, 1973 |
| 10 | Tony Paskins | 1963–1964* | 36 | 12 | 1 | 23 | 33.3% | – | – | – |
| 11 | Russell Pepperell | 1965 | 18 | 6 | 0 | 12 | 33.3% | – | – | – |
| 12 | George Hunter | 1968–1969 | 38 | 13 | 1 | 16 | 64.6% | – | 1968 | – |
| 13 | Frank Stanton | 1975–1979 | 123 | 77 | 3 | 43 | 62.6% | 1976, 1978 | – | 1976 |
| 14 | Allan Thomson | 1980 | 22 | 11 | 2 | 9 | 50% | – | – | – |
| 15 | Ray Ritchie | 1981–1982 | 53 | 32 | 2 | 19 | 60.4% | – | 1982 | – |
| 16 | Bob Fulton | 1983–1988, 1993-1999 | 307 | 205 | 6 | 96 | 66.8% | 1987, 1996 | 1983, 1995, 1997 | 1983, 1987, 1995, 1996, 1997 |
| 17 | Alan Thompson | 1989 | 22 | 9 | 1 | 12 | 40.9% | – | – | – |
| 18 | Graham Lowe | 1990–1992 | 70 | 40 | 3 | 27 | 57.1% | – | – | – |
| 19 | Peter Sharp | 1999, 2003 | 41 | 16 | 1 | 24 | 39% | – | – | – |
| 20 | Des Hasler | 2004–2011, 2019–2022 | 303 | 170 | 0 | 133 | 56.1% | 2008, 2011 | 2007 | – |
| 21 | Geoff Toovey | 2012–2015 | 105 | 61 | 1 | 43 | 57.5% | – | 2013 | – |
| 22 | Trent Barrett | 2016–2018 | 78 | 31 | 0 | 47 | 39.7% | – | – | – |
| 23 | Anthony Seibold | 2023–2026 | 74 | 37 | 2 | 38 | 48% | – | – | – |
| 24 | Kieran Foran | 2026–present | 8 | 7 | 0 | 1 | 88% | – | – | – |

* as captain-coach

== See also ==
- List of current NRL coaches
- List of current NRL Women's coaches
