= Robert Heaney =

Robert Heaney may refer to:

- Robert Heaney (rugby league) (1936–2019), Australian rugby league player
- Robert S. Heaney (born 1972), theologian and Anglican priest
