= Kevin O'Brien (rugby league) =

Australian rugby league player (born 1932)

Personal information
- Born: 22 March 1932 (age 94) Sydney, New South Wales, Australia

Playing information
- Position: Centre / Versatile back
Club
Years	Team	Pld	T	G	FG	P
1954–58	St George Dragons	65	38	17	0	148
Representative
Years	Team	Pld	T	G	FG	P
1956	New South Wales	3	2	0	0	6
1956–57	Australia
- Source: Whiticker/Hudson

Kevin O'Brien (born 1932) is an Australian former rugby league footballer in the 1950s. He was a premiership winning centre with the St George Dragons, made state representative appearances and toured with the Australian national side in 1956–57.

== Playing career ==
O'Brien played five seasons with the St. George Dragons between 1954 and 1958. He won a premiership with St. George Dragons, playing alongside Merv Lees in the 1956 Grand Final. He also represented New South Wales in two appearances in 1956, and was selected to tour England with the 1956-57 Kangaroo Tour. He played in 11 matches on tour, but no Tests. He was able to play at wing, fullback, centre and five-eighth. He is listed on the Australian Players Register as Kangaroo No. 326. He retired at the conclusion of the 1958 season.

== Accolades ==
O'Brien was a foundation member of the Penshurst R.S.L. junior rugby league football club, and the Kevin "Obie" O'Brien Award is awarded to members of the Penshurst R.S.L. Club to recognise service beyond life membership.
