= Cec Fifield =

Australian RL coach and former Australia international rugby league footballer

Personal information
- Full name: Cecil Richard Henry Fifield
- Born: 23 September 1903 Adelong, New South Wales, Australia
- Died: 7 December 1957 (aged 54) Earlwood, New South Wales, Australia

Playing information
- Position: Centre
Club
Years	Team	Pld	T	G	FG	P
1923–29	Western Suburbs	50	18	3	0	60
1930	Balmain	14	0	0	0	0
1930–36	Hull FC	224	80
1937	Canterbury-Bankstown	8	0	0	0	0
1938	Western Suburbs	9	2	5	0	16
	Total	305	100	8	0	76
Representative
Years	Team	Pld	T	G	FG	P
1925–29	New South Wales	10	3	4	0	17
1929–30	Australia	4	0	0	0	0
1937	Dominion XIII

Coaching information
Club
Years	Team	Gms	W	D	L	W%
1930	Balmain	14	5	2	7	36
1938	Western Suburbs	14	4	1	9	29
1944	Canterbury-Bankstown	9	3	1	5	33
1956	Parramatta	18	4	1	13	22
	Total	55	16	5	34	29
- Relatives: George Fifield (nephew); Jack Fifield (nephew)

Cec "Dicky" Fifield (1903–1957) was an Australian rugby league footballer who played in the 1920s and 1930s, and coached in the 1930s, 1940s and 1950s. An Australian international and New South Wales interstate representative centre, he played in the NSWRFL premiership for Sydney clubs, Western Suburbs, Balmain and Canterbury-Bankstown, as well as in England for Hull FC. Following his playing career, Fifield returned to the NSWRFL premiership as coach, first with Canterbury-Bankstown then with Parramatta.

== Background ==
Cecil Richard Henry Fifield was born to Sara Ann (née Compton) and George Fifield in Adelong, New South Wales, Australia on 23 September 1903. He played for West Wyalong as a teenager in Group 9.

== Club career ==
Fifield was recruited to play in the NSWRFL premiership with the Western Suburbs club, playing there during the 1923, 1925–26, 1929 and 1936 seasons. He played over 100 first grade games with the Magpies. He was selected to play for the New South Wales rugby league team in 1925 and 1929. After the latter season Fifield was selected to play on the 1929–30 Kangaroo tour of Great Britain. The team sailed on the Orsova via the Panama Canal and played an exhibition game in New York before arriving in England, with Fifield becoming Kangaroo number 152. The first Test was played at Hull, Yorkshire, the second at Wembley and the third at Swinton, during which there was an infamous controversy over a disallowed try. After much deliberation it was decided to play a fourth Test at Rochdale. This was the first and only time that a fourth test has been played on any Kangaroo tour. In this match Fifield broke his ankle and was unable to play the remainder of the tour.

Kangaroos 1st Test 1929.

On returning to Australia in 1930 Fifield played for and captained Balmain, and in 1931 he returned to England to play football for Hull, Boulevard. Owing to the difference in seasons, he played there until it was time to depart England and returned to Australia to play for Junee. Fifield continued to play for Hull, playing 224 games and scoring 80 tries, gaining England Championship honours in 1936 and in 1937 he returned to Australia. He played one season with Canterbury-Bankstown in 1937 before returning to Western Suburbs as captain-coach for the 1938 NSWRFL season.

== Coaching career ==
After a couple of years' involvement with Canterbury-Bankstown, during which he coached the team in 1944, Fifield returned to England. In 1950 he was approached by English club Rochdale Hornets to be Manager-Coach and to select several young players to help strengthen their team. He selected Tom Duffy, Wally Elliot, Cec "Babe" Kelly, Reg Stanford and Ron Stanford. They arrived in Rochdale in September 1950 and commenced training. The Australian Rugby League lodged a complaint against the five boys playing for Rochdale owing to the then current "poaching" ban being in place. The Rugby League case was lost because these boys were junior rugby union players not affiliated to any Rugby League Club, although they had played Rugby League as teenagers. The boys had a successful career before returning to Australia. Fifield's last appointment was as coach of Parramatta for one year in the 1956 NSWRFL season. The blue and golds had struggled massively in their first nine years in the competition, and under Fifield they could not avoid the wooden spoon although his record of four wins and a draw was superior to anything Parramatta would achieve between 1957 and 1961.

== Death ==
Cec "Dick" Fifield died suddenly at his Earlwood home on 7 December 1957 at the age of 54. After a largely attended funeral, he was cremated at Rookwood on 11 December 1957.

== Accolades ==
In 2008 he was named as one of the Australian Rugby League's 100 Greatest Players of all Time.

Cec never had any sons. Jack and George Fifield were his nephews born to Norman. They both started playing rugby league in Sydney in the late 1940s.

His Epitaph reads: "He was the most marked man on the field but the most respected off"
