= George Fifield =

Australian rugby league footballer

Playing information
- Position: Wing
Club
Years	Team	Pld	T	G	FG	P
1953–57	Balmain Tigers	42	29	29	0	145
1959–60	St. George Dragons	4	4	0	0	12
	Total	46	33	29	0	157
- Relatives: Jack Fifield (brother); Cec Fifield (uncle)

George Fifield is an Australian former rugby league footballer.

Fifield was a nephew of Australian representative centre Cec Fifield.

A winger, Fifield played President's Cup for Balmain and made his first grade debut in 1953. He scored a career high 11 tries for Balmain in the 1954 NSWRFL season, which was bettered only by his brother Jack Fifield. In 1959, Fifield joined a dominant St. George and had an immediate impact with a hat–trick on debut against Canterbury, only to have his season ended soon after due to a broken leg.

Fifield competed with Illawarra club Northern Suburbs in 1961, before taking over as coach of Wentworthville.
