= Barry O'Connell =

Australian rugby league footballer and coach

Personal information
- Full name: Barry Terrence O'Connell
- Born: 11 December 1935
- Died: 17 October 2021 (aged 85)

Playing information
- Position: Fullback
Club
| Years | Team | Pld | T | G | FG | P |
|---|---|---|---|---|---|---|
| 1956–59 | Eastern Suburbs | 65 | 11 | 72 | 0 | 177 |
| 1960–64 | Manly-Warringah | 85 | 8 | 44 | 0 | 112 |
| | Total | 150 | 19 | 116 | 0 | 289 |
- Source: Whiticker/Hudson
- Relatives: Wally O'Connell (brother)

Barry O'Connell (Paddington, Sydney), is an Australian rugby league footballer who played in the 1950s 1960s. He played in the New South Wales Rugby League (NSWRL) – Australia's major competition in that sport.

== Biography ==
Barry was one of three O'Connell brothers to play for the Eastern Suburbs club in the New South Wales Rugby League (NSWRL), older brother Wally captained Australia in that sport.

O'Connell attended Waverley primary and Paddington technical college.

O'Connell, who played in the halves, was an Easts junior who debuted with the club in the 1956 at the age of 19. In the years 1956–59, he scored 177 points from 11 tries and 72 field goal, he made around 60 appearances for the Eastern Suburbs club, many as captain.

In 1960, Barry joined the Manly Warrigah club, playing 85 matches, many of those also as captain. He played for Manly in the years 1960–64. After leaving Manly he took up a role as a captain-coach in the rural NSW town of Mudgee. His final year of rugby league, 1967, was spent captaining the Dunedoo club, who played in the Group 14 competition, to their first premiership, and was named as that competition's leading player.
