= Merv Lees =

Australian rugby league player (1932–2018)

Personal information
- Full name: Mervyn John Lees
- Born: 1 November 1932 Sydney, New South Wales, Australia
- Died: 11 May 2018 (aged 85) Caringbah, New South Wales, Australia

Playing information
- Position: Centre
Club
| Years | Team | Pld | T | G | FG | P |
|---|---|---|---|---|---|---|
| 1953–58 | St George Dragons | 56 | 35 | 0 | 0 | 105 |
Representative
| Years | Team | Pld | T | G | FG | P |
| 1954–55 | New South Wales | 5 | 3 | 0 | 0 | 9 |
| 1956 | NSW City | 1 | 2 | 0 | 0 | 6 |

Mervyn John Lees (1932–2018) was an Australian professional rugby league footballer who played in the 1950s. He was a premiership-winning centre with the St George Dragons and a state representative.

== Career ==
Merv 'Smacka' Lees played five seasons at the St George Dragons between 1953-1958 and began his rugby league career at the Banksia Waratahs R.L.F.C. as a child. He went on to win a premiership with St George in 1956 under coach Norm Tipping, and also played in the 1953 grand final side that were runners up. Injuries curtailed his career, and he retired in 1959.

Lees was a prolific tryscorer. His best performance was possibly on 24 July 1954 in a club first grade game against the North Sydney Bears at the Sydney Cricket Ground when he scored five tries.

Lees represented New South Wales on four occasions between 1954 and 1955 which included the infamous 'Abandoned Game' against the touring English team on 10 July 1954 at the S.C.G.

A newspaper article in the St. George and Sutherland Shire Leader in 2012 regarding Merv Lees' 80th birthday suggested he was still in good health and still had many great memories of his playing career for the St George Dragons and N.S.W. Lees was an active member of the Men of League Foundation during his final years.

== Death ==
Lees died on 11 May 2018 aged 85.
