= Jack Fifield (rugby league) =

Australian rugby league footballer (born 1929)

Personal information
- Full name: John Raymond Fifield
- Born: 1929 (age 96–97)

Playing information
- Position: Centre
Club
Years	Team	Pld	T	G	FG	P
1950–55	Balmain	57	30	31	0	152
1957–58	St. George	37	20	0	0	60
	Total	94	50	31	0	212
- Relatives: George Fifield (brother); Cec Fifield (uncle)

John Raymond Fifield (born 1929) is an Australian former rugby league footballer who played in the 1950s.

== Career ==
Fifield was graded from Balmain's Presidents Cup in 1949 played 5 seasons for the Balmain club between 1950-1955 and captained the club on numerous occasions. He then joined St. George for two seasons in 1957 and 1958. He won a premiership with St. George, playing centre in the 1957 Grand Final.

He was the nephew of Cec Fifield, the brilliant Kangaroo centre (1929-1930).

Fifield retired after the 1958 season.
