= Wally O'Connell =

Australian RL coach and former Australia international rugby league footballer

Personal information
- Full name: Walter Patrick O'Connell
- Born: 16 April 1923 Paddington, New South Wales, Australia
- Died: 27 June 2017 (aged 94) Bellevue Hill, New South Wales, Australia

Playing information
- Position: Five-eighth
Club
Years	Team	Pld	T	G	FG	P
1942–48	Eastern Suburbs	89	24	7	0	86
1949	Brothers (Wollongong)
1951–52	Manly-Warringah	34	11	0	0	33
	Total	123	35	7	0	119
Representative
Years	Team	Pld	T	G	FG	P
1943–52	City NSW	3	0	0	0	0
1948–52	New South Wales	5	1	0	0	3
1948–51	Australia	10	2	0	0	6

Coaching information
Club
Years	Team	Gms	W	D	L	W%
1951–52	Manly-Warringah	40	24	0	16	60
1966–67	Manly-Warringah	42	23	2	17	55
	Total	82	47	2	33	57
Representative
Years	Team	Gms	W	D	L	W%
1973	Queensland	3	0	0	3	0
- Relatives: Barry O'Connell (brother)

Walter Patrick O'Connell OAM (16 April 1923 – 27 June 2017) was an Australian rugby league footballer who played in the 1940s and 1950s, and coached in the 1950s, 1960s and 1970s. He was a five-eighth for the Australian national team. He played in ten Tests between 1948 and 1951 as captain on one occasion. Wally's younger brother Barry also played first grade football for Easts and Manly.

== Playing career ==
=== Eastern Suburbs ===
An Eastern Suburbs junior, O'Connell's NSWRFL first grade career commenced in 1942 with the Eastern Suburbs club with whom he spent seven seasons and played 80 games. His first representative match was for City New South Wales in 1943. On 18 June 1945 a Sydney rugby league team featuring O'Connell travelled to Newcastle to play against their representative team and were defeated 27–26. He was the Roosters' pivot in their 1945 premiership final victory over Balmain.

With senior representative matches cancelled during WWII O'Connell didn't make his Test debut until 1948 against New Zealand in Sydney. He was selected for the 1948-49 Kangaroo Tour and played in five Tests and 16 minor tour games. His sole appearance as captain of the Kangaroos was in the First Test at Leeds of the 1948 Ashes series.

=== Manly-Warringah ===
Having been admitted to the Sydney top-grade competition in 1947 the young Manly-Warringah Sea Eagles in 1949 had suffered three lean seasons and set about to secure the services of O'Connell, then regarded as one of the stars of the Australian game. He spent the 1949 season as captain-coach with Christian Brothers Wollongong. The Manly committee secured O'Connell with a 350-pound offer but his registration for the 1950 season was thwarted when Eastern Suburbs blocked the transfer on residential grounds. The Easts committee were dissatisfied with residential evidence O'Connell was able to table for himself and sought proof that O'Connell's wife had also already made the move to Manly. O'Connell was unable to provide this on-the-spot at the meeting, the transfer was blocked and on principle he chose to sit out the 1950 season thereby also jeopardizing his representative career.

O'Connell played two seasons with Manly as captain-coach leading them to 2nd place on the 1951 competition ladder and to the club's first Grand final appearance. He was unable to play in that match due to a fractured bone in his wrist, so was forced to watch from the sideline as his team lost to Souths by a record grand final margin.

His final international appearance was in the 3rd Test of the 1951 domestic series against France.

== Post playing ==
In retirement O'Connell commenced a media career calling rugby league games for Sydney radio on 2UW. In 1966 he took up the coaching role at Manly and was responsible for promoting the young Illawarra junior and future Immortal Bob Fulton straight into first-grade at age 17.

On Australia Day 2004 O'Connell was awarded the Order of Australia Medal "service to rugby league football, particularly as a player and coach".

O'Connell was Australia's oldest living Test captain up until his death on 27 June 2017, at the age of 94.

== Footnotes ==
- Whiticker, Alan (2004) Captaining the Kangaroos, New Holland, Sydney
- Andrews, Malcolm (2006) The ABC of Rugby League Austn B
- Whiticker, Alan / Hudson, Glen (1995) The Encyclopedia of Rugby League Players, Gary Allen Pty Ltd. Sydney

Sporting positions
Preceded by Bob Bax; 1971–1972	Coach Queensland; 1973	Succeeded by Barry Muir; 1974–1978
Preceded by Russell Pepperell; 1964–1965	Coach Manly-Warringah; 1966–1967	Succeeded by George Hunter; 1968–1969
Preceded by George Mullins; 1949	Coach Manly-Warringah; 1950–1952	Succeeded by Roy Bull; 1953
Preceded by Col Maxwell	Captain Australia; 1948	Succeeded by Bill Tyquin
