= Doug Fleming =

Personal information
- Full name: Douglas Norman Fleming
- Born: 24 April 1930 Sydney, New South Wales, [Australia
- Died: 14 August 1998 (aged 68) Burleigh Waters, Queensland, Australia

Playing information
- Position: Fullback
Club
| Years | Team | Pld | T | G | FG | P |
|---|---|---|---|---|---|---|
| 1949–57 | St. George | 120 | 12 | 281 | 0 | 598 |
- Source: Whiticker/Hudson
- Father: Norm Fleming

Douglas Norman Fleming (1930–1998) was an Australian professional rugby league footballer who played in the 1940s and 1950s. A goal-kicking fullback, he played in NSWRFL for Sydney's St. George club, winning the 1949 and 1956 Premierships with them. Fleming also played for Dapto's rugby league club. He was the son of the former St. George Dragons halfback Norm Fleming.

== Playing career ==
In 1949 Fleming started playing in the NSWRFL's first grade premiership for St. George, forcing the club's Test fullback Noel Pidding onto the wing. At the end of the 1949 NSWRFL season he played for St. George at fullback in their grand final victory.

Fleming was the 1955 NSWRFL season's top point-scorer. In 1956 he represented Sydney against the New Zealand Māori rugby league team.

Fleming was also the 1956 NSWRFL season's top point scorer with a personal best 189 points, and he played at fullback in St. George's 1956 Grand Final victory.

After 8 seasons in first grade at St. George, the 1957 NSWRFL season was the last to feature Fleming.
