= Ron Potter =

Australian rugby league footballer

Personal information
- Full name: Ronald Potter

Playing information
- Position: Second-row
Club
Years	Team	Pld	T	G	FG	P
1956–57	Balmain	34	5	0	0	15
1959	Eastern Suburbs	13	1	0	0	3
1960–62	North Sydney	31	4	0	0	12
	Total	78	10	0	0	30
Representative
Years	Team	Pld	T	G	FG	P
1956	New South Wales	2	0	0	0	0
1954	NSW Country	1	0	0	0	0

Ron Potter is an Australian former rugby league footballer in the New South Wales Rugby Football League premiership.

Potter played for the Balmain, Eastern Suburbs and North Sydney clubs as well as being a representative of his state, New South Wales in the sport. Potter had two seasons with Balmain between 1956 and 1957. He represented New South Wales on two occasions during 1956. In the 1956 season the second rower was a member of the Balmain side that was beaten by St George in that year's premiership decider. A backrower, Potter had just the one season at Easts in 1959 and is recognised as the Eastern Suburbs club's 491st player. He finished his career at North Sydney for three seasons between 1960 and 1962.
