= Bob Bax =

Australian RL coach and former rugby league footballer

Personal information
- Full name: Robert Dean Bax
- Born: 23 March 1925
- Died: 11 March 2000 (aged 74)

Playing information
- Position: Halfback
Club
Years	Team	Pld	T	G	FG	P
	Past Brothers
Representative
Years	Team	Pld	T	G	FG	P
	Brisbane

Coaching information
Club
Years	Team	Gms	W	D	L	W%
1956–59	Past Brothers	81	62	1	18	77
1960–70	Northern Suburbs	252	177	8	67	70
1977	Northern Suburbs	22	11	0	11	50
	Total	355	250	9	96	70
Representative
Years	Team	Gms	W	D	L	W%
1971–73	Queensland	5	0	0	5	0

Robert Bax (1925-2000) was an Australian rugby league footballer and coach. During the 1940s, he played in the Brisbane Rugby League premiership as a half back for the Brothers club and also played for the Brisbane rugby league team in the Bulimba Cup. From 1956 to 1970 Bax coached Brothers and Norths, reaching 14 grand finals and taking nine premierships.

Bax inherited the coaching role at the Brisbane Rugby League's reigning premiers, Northern Suburbs RLFC from Clive Churchill in 1960 and won the premiership again that year. Norths then became the first club in BRL history to win three consecutive first grade premierships when they defeated Fortitude Valley 29–5 in the 1961 grand final in front of a record club crowd of 19,824 at Lang Park. Bax extended this record winning streak to six, claiming premierships again in 1962, 1963 and 1964. He coached the side to two more grand final wins in 1966 and 1969.

In 1971, Bax became the first coach to sign an Australian rules football player: Barry Spring, who was 26 and had never played a game of rugby league. Spring frequently kicked field goals from anywhere within a 60-yard range, leading to a rule change, with two points for a field goal changing to one point in 1971.

In 1992, Bax was part of a six-man panel selected by Rugby League Week to name an all-time greatest team to celebrate rugby league in Australia's 85th year. Bob Bax's son, Robert Bax, operated the Brisbane law firm, Robert Bax and Associates. Bax died in 2000 at age 74 after a long illness and was buried in Nudgee Cemetery. The Norths Devils' award for "Player most likely to succeed" was named the Bob Bax Award in his honour. In 2008, the Norths clubs' 75th anniversary year, Bax was named as coach of their all-time greatest team.

Sporting positions
Preceded by Des Crow; 1968–1970	Coach Queensland; 1971–1972	Succeeded by Wally O'Connell; 1973
