= Peter Carroll (rugby league) =

Australian rugby league footballer (born 1932)

Personal information
- Full name: Peter Robert Carroll
- Born: 7 March 1932 (age 94) Largs, New South Wales, Australia

Playing information
- Position: Five-eighth
Club
Years	Team	Pld	T	G	FG	P
1951–58	St. George	101	24	0	0	72

Peter Robert Carroll (born 7 March 1932) is an Australian former rugby league footballer who played in the 1950s.

== Playing career ==
Carroll played seven seasons for St. George between 1951 and 1958. He won two premierships with St. George, playing five-eighth in the 1956 Grand Final and the 1957 Grand Final.

He retired at the end of the 1958 season. Carroll played 101 first games for the Dragons and scored 24 tries during his career.

Carroll was awarded Life Membership by St. George in 1993.
