= Norm Fleming =

Australian rugby league footballer

- Norm Fleming. 1930

Personal information
- Full name: Norman Charles John Fleming
- Born: 4 February 1903; Pyrmont, New South Wales, Australia
- Died: 12 September 1964 (aged 61); Jannali, New South Wales, Australia

Playing information
- Position: Halfback, Five-eighth
Club
Years	Team	Pld	T	G	FG	P
1929–33	St. George	18	4	0	0	12
- Relatives: Doug Fleming (son)

Norman Charles John Fleming (4 February 1903 – 12 September 1964) was an Australian rugby league footballer who played in the 1920s and 1930s.

== Playing career ==
Fleming came to St. George via the local Brighton junior club in 1929. He was a five-eighth and halfback in his playing days and turned out for the Saints on 65 occasions., including 18 first grade games.

Norm Fleming later coached his famous son, Doug Fleming in the lower grades at St. George in the late 1940s. Norm Fleming also served in the RAAF in World War II.

== Death ==
Fleming died on 12 September 1964 at Jannali, New South Wales.
