= Norm Tipping =

Australian RL coach and former rugby league footballer

- Tipping 1947

Personal information
- Full name: Norman Herbert Tipping
- Born: 10 January 1913 Hurstville, New South Wales, Australia
- Died: 11 March 2002 (aged 89) Cronulla, New South Wales, Australia

Playing information
- Position: Centre
Club
Years	Team	Pld	T	G	FG	P
1932–44	St George Dragons	25	1	1		5

Coaching information
Club
Years	Team	Gms	W	D	L	W%
1953	St George Dragons	18	12	1	5	67
1956	St George Dragons	18	12	0	6	67
	Total	36	24	1	11	67
- Source: Whiticker/Hudson

Norman Herbert Tipping (1913–2002) was an Australian rugby league footballer who played in the 1930s and 1940s. He later became a premiership winning first grade coach for the St George Dragons.

== Playing career ==
Born in Hurstville, New South Wales, Norm Tipping's early football was rugby union played with the St. George Rugby Union Club. His first grade rugby league career was often curtailed by serious injury, although he did complete five seasons with the St George club between 1932 and 1933, 1936, and 1943–1944.

In 1936 he suffered a near career ending spinal injury while playing in an end of season tour match and was in plaster for months. Incredibly, after seven seasons in retirement he returned to first grade football in 1943 and finally retired at the end of the 1944 season.

Norm Tipping, 1933

== Premiership winning coach ==
He then went into coaching in the St George Dragons lower grades before being offered the head coaching job in 1953. The club made the Grand Final that season but lost the game to the South Sydney Rabbitohs 31–12. He lost the job for the next two seasons, but was again made head coach in 1956 and won the premiership, with St. George beating Balmain 18–12 in the Grand Final. This match was the first of eleven straight premierships that St. George would eventually win from 1956 to 1966.

Even though he was now a Grand Final winning coach, Norm Tipping was again dropped as coach in 1957 due to inter-club politics. He accepted the coaching role of St. George's under 21 team for the next decade and never coached first grade again.

== Death ==
Norm Tipping died on 11 March 2002 at his Cronulla, New South Wales home, aged 89.
