= George Lenon =

Australian rugby league footballer

Personal information
- Full name: George Lenon
- Born: Sydney, New South Wales, Australia
- Died: 18 December 2016; Sydney, New South Wales, Australia

Playing information
- Position: Hooker
Club
Years	Team	Pld	T	G	FG	P
1955–60	Manly-Warringah	75	0	0	0	0
- Source: As of 29 March 2019

George Lenon was an Australian professional rugby league footballer who played in the 1950s and 1960s. He played for Manly-Warringah in the New South Wales Rugby League (NSWRL) competition. Lenon was a well-respected figure within the Manly Warringah Club. After his playing career, Lenon became one of two selectors for Manly Warringah's first grade in the 1970s. As a selector, Lenon contributed to Manly's success, winning premierships in 1972, 1973, 1976 and 1978. For his contributions to the club, Lenon became an exclusive life member.

== Playing career ==
Lenon made his first grade debut for Manly-Warringah in 1955. In 1957, Manly reached their second grand final against St George. Lenon played at hooker in the match as St George outclassed Manly to win 31–9. In 1958, Manly made the finals again but failed to reach the grand final.

In 1959, Manly reached their third grand final and once again the opponents were St George. Lenon played at hooker in the grand final as St George kept Manly scoreless winning their 4th straight premiership 20–0. Lenon retired the following season in 1960. Lenon was the older brother of Bob Lenon who played for Manly in the 1950s and 1960s.

Lenon was a well-respected figure within the Manly Warringah Club. Lenon became one of two selectors for Manly Warringah's first grade in the 1970s. As a selector, Lenon contributed to Manly's success, winning premierships in 1972, 1973, 1976 and 1978. For his contributions to the club, Lenon became an exclusive life member. He died on 18 December 2016.
