= Ray Ritchie =

Australian RL coach and former Australia international rugby league footballer

Personal information
- Born: 31 October 1936 Paddington, New South Wales
- Died: 13 March 2015 (aged 78)

Playing information
- Position: Wing, Centre
Club
Years	Team	Pld	T	G	FG	P
1955–59	Manly-Warringah	49	37	0	0	111
Representative
Years	Team	Pld	T	G	FG	P
1958	City NSW	1	0	0	0	0
1957	New South Wales	2	3	0	0	9
1957	Australia	1	1	0	0	3

Coaching information
Club
Years	Team	Gms	W	D	L	W%
1981–82	Manly-Warringah	53	32	19	2	60

Ray Ritchie (31 October 1936 – 13 March 2015) was an Australian professional rugby league footballer who played in the 1950s, and coached in the 1980s. A New South Wales state and Australia national representative three-quarter back, he played in the New South Wales Rugby League Premiership for Sydney's Manly-Warringah club, becoming their coach after retirement from playing.

== Playing career ==
Ritchie started playing first-grade for Sydney's Manly-Warringah club during the 1955 NSWRFL season. At the end of the following year, he was selected to play on the wing for a Combined Sydney team, scoring a try in their win against a touring Māori rugby league team. In 1957 he played for New South Wales against Queensland and made it into the Australian squad for the 1957 World Cup, becoming Kangaroo No. 334. Later in the year Ritchie was selected to play for Manly-Warringah in the 1957 NSWRFL season's grand final on the wing, but St. George won.

== Coaching career ==
Ritchie was appointed head coach of the Manly-Warringah Sea Eagles for the 1981 NSWRFL season and under him the club was back in the semi-finals that year. The following year Manly reached the grand final, but Ritchie stood down before the 1983 season, and was succeeded by Bob Fulton.

His daughter Donna attended the 1992, 1996 and 2000 Summer Paralympics as a wheelchair basketballer and won a silver medal in 2000.

Sporting positions
Preceded by Allan Thomson; 1980	Coach Manly-Warringah; 1981–1982	Succeeded by Bob Fulton; 1983–1988
