= Terry McGovern (rugby league) =

Australian rugby league footballer

Personal information
- Full name: Terry McGovern

Playing information
- Position: Wing, Centre
Club
Years	Team	Pld	T	G	FG	P
1953–56	Balmain	28	17	0	0	51
1957–59	Newtown	46	12	0	0	36
1960–61	Manly-Warringah	18	5	0	0	15
	Total	92	34	0	0	102
- Source: As of 2 May 2019

Terry McGovern was an Australian professional rugby league footballer who played in 1950s and 1960s. He played for Balmain, Newtown and Manly-Warringah in the New South Wales Rugby League (NSWRL) competition.

== Playing career ==
McGovern made his first grade debut for Balmain in 1953. In 1955, McGovern finished as joint top try scorer for the club with 8 tries. McGovern scored 2 tries for Balmain in the 1956 preliminary final against South Sydney as the club reached the grand final ending Souths dominance of appearing in grand finals throughout the 1950s.

McGovern played on the wing in the 1956 grand final against St George. Balmain lost the match 18-12 in front of 60,000 fans at the Sydney Cricket Ground. The grand final win for St George was their first of 11 successive premiership victories.

In 1957, McGovern joined Newtown and played 3 seasons for the club. In his final season with the side in 1959, Newtown finished 4th but were eliminated in the semi-final by Manly losing 17-0. The loss was McGovern's final game for the club. In 1960, McGovern joined Manly-Warringah making 18 appearances over 2 seasons at the club before retiring following the conclusion of the 1961 season.
