= Kevin Mosman =

Australian rugby league footballer

Personal information
- Full name: Kevin Mosman

Playing information
- Position: Centre
Club
| Years | Team | Pld | T | G | FG | P |
|---|---|---|---|---|---|---|
| 1956–57 | Balmain | 33 | 14 | 0 | 0 | 42 |
| 1958–59 | Manly-Warringah | 25 | 5 | 0 | 0 | 15 |
| | Total | 58 | 19 | 0 | 0 | 57 |
- Source: As of 29 March 2019

Kevin Mosman was an Australian professional rugby league footballer who played in the 1950s. He played for Manly-Warringah and Balmain in the NSWRL competition.

== Playing career ==
Mosman made his first grade debut for Balmain in 1956. Mosman scored a hat-trick for Balmain in the 1956 preliminary final against South Sydney as the club reached the grand final ending Souths dominance of appearing in grand finals throughout the 1950s.

Mosman played at centre in the 1956 grand final against St George. Balmain lost the match 18–12 in front of 60,000 fans at the Sydney Cricket Ground. The grand final win for St George was their first of 11 successive premiership victories. Mosman finished the 1956 season as Balmain's top try scorer. In 1958, Mosman joined Manly-Warringah.

In 1959, Manly reached the grand final and against St George. Mosman played at centre in the grand final as St George kept Manly scoreless winning their 4th straight premiership 20–0.

Mosman retired from Sydney football at the end of the 1959 season, to become captain-coach at West Wyalong, 1960-1962
