= Norman Robinson (rugby league) =

English rugby league footballer

Playing information
- Position: Stand-off
Club
Years	Team	Pld	T	G	FG	P
1946–47/48	Wakefield Trinity	19	4	0	0	12

Norman Robinson is a former professional rugby league footballer who played in the 1940s. He played at club level for Wakefield Trinity, as a stand-off.

== Playing career ==
Robinson made his début for Wakefield Trinity during April 1946.
