= Fred Dunn =

Australian rugby league footballer

Playing information
- Position: Fullback
Club
Years	Team	Pld	T	G	FG	P
1951–57	Canterbury-Bankstown	79	5	168	0	351

Fred Dunn is an Australian former professional rugby league footballer who played for Canterbury-Bankstown in the 1950s.

Dunn debuted in 1951 and went on to become Canterbury's fullback when Ron Willey left the club. He was often the first choice goal-kicker and amassed a career high 115 points in 1957, which was his final season. Fred Dunne scored the first goal on national TV.

From 1958 to 1959 he was coach of the reserves, then in the 1960s he served as club treasurer.
