= Brian Staunton =

Australian rugby league footballer (1931–2021)

Personal information
- Full name: Brian Frederick Staunton
- Born: 14 October 1931; Paddington, New South Wales, Australia
- Died: 30 November 2021 (aged 90); Cronulla, New South Wales, Australia

Playing information
- Height: 5 ft 10 in (1.78 m)
- Weight: 10 st 0 lb (64 kg)
- Position: Halfback
Club
Years	Team	Pld	T	G	FG	P
1952–54	Manly Warringah Sea Eagles	25	5	0	0	15
1955–58	Balmain Tigers	65	23	0	0	69
	Total	90	28	0	0	84
- Source: As of 5 April 2019

Brian Frederick Staunton (1931 – 2021) was an Australian former rugby league footballer who played in the 1950s.

== Playing career ==
Staunton started his career at Manly Warringah Sea Eagles. He played with them for three years, starting in 1952 when he played five-eighth in the 3rd-Grade Premiership-winning team. He then moved to Balmain Tigers for four years between 1955–1958 and captained them in the 1956 Grand Final. Staunton scored 2 tries in the grand final as St George Dragons defeated Balmain 18–12. The victory would start St George on their 11-straight premiership-winning run.
