= Eric Sladden =

Australian rugby league footballer

Personal information
- Full name: Eric Roy Sladden
- Born: 31 October 1936 Ourimbah, New South Wales, Australia
- Died: 7 February 2016 (aged 79) North Sydney, New South Wales, Australia

Playing information
- Position: Wing
Club
Years	Team	Pld	T	G	FG	P
1956–61	South Sydney	82	56	0	0	168
1962–67	North Sydney	84	24	0	0	72
	Total	166	80	0	0	240

Eric Sladden was an Australian professional rugby league footballer who played in the 1950s and 1960s. He played for South Sydney and North Sydney in the NSWRL premiership as a winger.

== Playing career ==
Sladden made his first grade debut for South Sydney in 1956. In 1957, Sladden scored five tries in a match against Parramatta at Cumberland Oval. Sladden holds this record with other Souths legends including Harold Horder and John Graves. After a successful spell at Souths, Sladden joined North Sydney and spent six seasons with the club including being a member of two finals campaigns, the first being in 1964 when Norths reached the finals for the first time in a number of years before losing to Balmain and in 1965 when the club finished second on the table only to bow out in consecutive finals matches. Sladden retired at the end of 1967.
