= William Lloyd (rugby league) =

Australian rugby league footballer (1934–2011)

Personal information
- Full name: William Wallace Brooks Lloyd
- Born: 14 September 1934 Darlinghurst, New South Wales, Australia
- Died: 21 December 2011 (aged 77) Collaroy, New South Wales, Australia

Playing information
- Position: Centre
Club
Years	Team	Pld	T	G	FG	P
1955–60	Manly Sea Eagles	87	18	0	0	54
- Source: Whiticker/Hudson

William Wallace Brooks Lloyd (14 September 1934 – 21 December 2011) was an Australian rugby league footballer.

Born in Darlinghurst, New South Wales, Lloyd played his junior football with Collaroy Surf Club and Narrabeen Junior Rugby League Club before making his New South Wales Rugby Football League premiership debut for Manly-Warringah club in 1955.

Lloyd retired from rugby league in 1960 after 87 games with Manly. He died in Collaroy, New South Wales on 21 December 2011, at the age of 77.
