= Robert Heaney (rugby league) =

Australian rugby league footballer (1936–2019)

Personal information
- Full name: Robert Heaney
- Born: 31 August 1936 Newcastle, New South Wales, Australia
- Died: 13 January 2019 (aged 82) Belmont, New South Wales

Playing information
- Position: Prop
Club
Years	Team	Pld	T	G	FG	P
1956–57	Balmain	23	2	0	0	6
Representative
Years	Team	Pld	T	G	FG	P
1959	NSW Country	1	0	0	0	0
- Source: As of 22 February 2019

Robert Heaney (1936–2019), nicknamed "Babe", was an Australian rugby league footballer who played in the 1950s. He played for Balmain in the NSWRL Competition.

== Playing career ==
Heaney played for Lakes United in the Newcastle Rugby League before joining Balmain with whom he his first grade debut in 1956. Heaney played in the 1956 NSWRL grand final against St George at the Sydney Cricket Ground. Balmain lost the match 18–12 and the victory started St George on a run of 11 straight premiership victories.

Heaney played on with Balmain in 1957 before departing the club and joining Maitland in the Newcastle Rugby League. In 1959, Heaney represented NSW Country. Heaney represented Newcastle against touring sides from New Zealand (1959) and France (1960).

== Death ==
Heaney died on 13 January 2019.
