= George Hunter (rugby league) =

Australian former RL coach and professional rugby league footballer

Personal information
- Full name: George Hunter
- Born: 13 October 1928 Kurri Kurri, New South Wales, Australia
- Died: 17 August 2009 (aged 80)

Playing information
Club
Years	Team	Pld	T	G	FG	P
1945	Abermain Reds
1946	Kurri Kurri Bulldogs
1947	Yass United
1948	Kurri Kurri Bulldogs
1949–1958	Manly-Warringah
1950	Warialda
1953	Jindabyne
1960	North Sydney Bears
	Total	0	0	0	0	0
Representative
Years	Team	Pld	T	G	FG	P
1948	NSW Country	0	0	0	0	0
1954	New South Wales	1	1	0	0	3

Coaching information
Club
Years	Team	Gms	W	D	L	W%
1968–69	Manly-Warringah	48	31	0	17	65
- Source: As of 20 March 2021

George Hunter (13 October 1928 – 17 August 2009) was an Australian rugby league footballer who played in the 1940 and 1950s who also coached the Manly-Warringah Sea Eagles first grade team. Hunter played in two New South Wales Rugby League first grade Grand finals as well as coaching Manly-Warringah to a Grand final in 1968.

== Club career ==
George Hunter began his rugby league career playing as a junior player with the Abermain Reds Rugby League club. In 1945, he began his senior career with the Kurri Kurri Bulldogs. He then joined Manly in 1949.

George Hunter's played 8 seasons with Manly between 1949 and 1958, and captained the club on numerous occasions during this period. His career took him to two grand finals with Manly-Warringah in 1951 and 1957, although he missed the 1959 grand final due to injury. In 1959, he announced his retirement due to those injuries, but in 1960, North Sydney enticed him out of retirement for one last season.

== Representative career ==
Hunter represented NSW Country v City in 1948. He represented for New South Wales v Queensland in 1954 scoring a try in their 18–13 victory. Hunter also played in a Possibles v Probables Kangaroo Tour selection game.

== Coaching career ==
Hunter was captain-coach of Warialda Premiership winning team in 1950, and of Jindabyne in 1953.

After retiring from playing, he went on to coach Manly-Warringah Sea Eagles third-grade team from 1965 to 1967 and then their first-grade team in 1968 and 1969, including their appearance in the 1968 Grand Final loss to South Sydney. His coaching statistics in those two years at Manly show an impressive 31 wins from 48 games.

== Published sources ==
- Smith, Robert. The Sea Eagle has Landed
- Whiticker, Alan and Hudson, Glen. The Encyclopedia of Rugby League Players
- Apter, Jeff The Coaches : The Men Who Changed Rugby League (2014), The Five Mile Press Scoresby, Victoria

Sporting positions
Preceded by Wally O'Connell; 1966–1967	Coach Manly-Warringah Sea Eagles; 1968–1969	Succeeded by Ron Willey; 1970–1974
