= Fifield (surname) =

Fifield is a toponymic surname of Old English origin for people from any place named Fifield or Fyfield, which all mean five hides (of land). Notable people with the surname include:

- Adele Fifield (born 1966), Canadian director of the War Amps' National Amputee Centre
- Anna Fifield (born 1976), American journalist
- Arthur Fifield, founder of English publishing house A. C. Fifield, taken over in 1922 by Jonathan Cape
- Benjamin F. Fifield (1832–1918), Vermont attorney
- Cec Fifield (1903–1957), Australian rugby footballer and coach
- Christopher Fifield (1945–2025), English conductor, historian, and critic
- Darren Fifield (born 1969), English boxer of the 1990s
- Edwin G. Fifield (1862–1925), Wisconsin politician
- Effie Woodward Fifield (1857–1937), American writer and philanthropist
- Elaine Fifield (1930–1999), Australian ballerina
- George Fifield, Australian rugby league player
- George Fifield (1904–1962), Canadian boxer
- Jack Fifield (1871–1939), American baseball player
- Jack Fifield (born 1930), Australian rugby league player
- James W. Fifield Jr. (1899–1977), American Congregational minister and co-founder of Spiritual Mobilization
- Jim Fifield, American president/CEO of EMI
- Melissa Fifield (born 1992), American racer
- Mitch Fifield (born 1967), Australian politician
- Russell Hunt Fifield (1914–2003), American political scientist, writer and professor
- Sam Fifield (1839–1915), Wisconsin politician
- Walter Fifield Snyder (1912–1993), American historian
- William Fifield (1916–1987), American writer

== See also ==
- Fifield (disambiguation)
- Fyfield (disambiguation)
