= Fyfield =

Fyfield may refer to:

== People with the surname ==
- Frances Fyfield (born 1948), pseudonym of Frances Hegarty, English lawyer and crime-writer
- Jamal Fyfield (born 1989), English footballer
- Simon Fyfield, 16th-century English Member of Parliament

== Places in England ==
- Fyfield, Essex
- Fyfield, Gloucestershire, a hamlet in Eastleach parish
- Fyfield, Hampshire
- Fyfield, Oxfordshire
- Fyfield (near Marlborough), a village 3 miles west of Marlborough, Wiltshire
- Fyfield, Milton Lilbourne, a hamlet 1 mile east of Pewsey, Wiltshire
- Fyfield Down, on the Marlborough Downs in Wiltshire

== Other uses ==
- Fyfield Road, Oxford, England

== See also ==
- Fifield (disambiguation)
