= Frederic Cliffe =

English composer, organist and teacher (1857–1931)

Frederic Cliffe (2 May 1857 – 19 November 1931) was an English composer, organist and teacher.

== Life ==
Cliffe was born in Lowmoor, near Bradford, Yorkshire. As a youth, he showed a promising musical aptitude and was enrolled as a scholar of the National Training School of Music, the parent of the Royal College of Music, under its first Principal Arthur Sullivan. As well as Sullivan his teachers there included John Stainer, Ebenezer Prout and Franklin Taylor (1843-1919). In 1873 at the age of sixteen he was appointed organist to the Bradford Festival Choral Society. As organist to the Leeds Festival, Cliffe took part in the first performance of Sullivan's cantata The Golden Legend on 6 October 1886. He was organist to the Bach Choir between 1888 and 1894.

From 1884 to 1931 he held the post of Professor of Piano at the Royal College of Music. Among his pupils there were John Ireland and Arthur Benjamin. Cliffe was also occasionally connected with opera productions at Theatre Royal, Drury Lane, Her Majesty's Theatre and Covent Garden. For a time he was a professor at the Royal Academy of Music, though he maintained his links to the Royal College to the end of his life as a senior member of the Board of Professors. He also travelled widely as an examiner to the Associated Board of Music.

Cliffe died in London, aged 74. His wife Zillah was a cousin of Arthur Benjamin's father. Their son was the author Cedric Cliffe (1902-1969). He published The Making of Music (1949) and wrote the librettos for operas by Arthur Benjamin, John Joubert and Joan Trimble.

== Music ==
Cliffe's career as a composer spanned just two decades, from 1889 to 1910. His principal works were his two symphonies, the first of which was produced by August Manns at The Crystal Palace in 1889, and subsequently performed at a Philharmonic concert and at the Proms in 1901, being well received on each occasion. The Daily Telegraph hailed it as "a masterpiece". Although not overtly programmatic, its first movement was influenced by a visit to Norway by Cliffe. It was published by Novello. His Second Symphony had its first performance at the Leeds Festival in 1892. Cliffe gave titles to each of its movements: I. At Sunset. II. Night. III. Fairy Revels. IV. Morning. It has been edited (2010) by Lionel Harrison and published by Patrick Meadows. The Violin Concerto, composed in Switzerland's Engadine Valley, was commissioned by the Norwich Festival and performed there on 7 October 1896 with the Hungarian violinist Tivadar Nachéz.

His 'scena', The Triumph of Alcestis, for contralto voice and orchestra, was composed for Clara Butt, and his five movement setting of Charles Kingsley’s Ode to the North East Wind (1905) was popular with choral societies. Its third movement is a programmatic orchestral Nocturne. However, after the Coronation March of 1910 he stopped composing altogether, and subsequently his works received fewer performances. According to the Bournemouth conductor Dan Godfrey he "was not cast in the mould of a fighter and as a result he has, I feel, unwisely, retired from the struggle".

Cliffe's music remained unperformed for many years after his death. After its initial performances, the Violin Concerto was unheard until revived by the Lambeth Orchestra, conducted by Christopher Fifield, in May 2007. Fifield also conducted the first modern performance of the Symphony in C, 111 years after its premiere, on 16 December 2000.

== List of works ==
- Symphony in C minor , 1889 (pub. 2019 Scores Reformed)
- Orchestral Picture: Cloud and Sunshine, Philharmonic Society 1890
- Symphony in E minor, 1892 (pub. 2010 Soundpost)
- Violin Concerto in D minor, 1896 (pub. 2007 Soundpost)
- The Triumph of Alcestis, Scena for Contralto and Orchestra, Sheffield Festival 1902
- Ode to the North-East Wind, Choral Ballad, Norwich Festival 1905
- A Silent Voice, song
- Out of the Deep, anthem
- Coronation March 1910

== Recordings ==
The Symphony No. 1 in C minor and his tone poem 'Cloud and Sunshine' have been recorded (Sterling CDS-1055-2 (2003) by the Malmö Opera Orchestra conducted by musicologist Christopher Fifield.

His Violin Concerto in D minor was edited in 2007 by Fifield and published by Patrick Meadows, and has now been recorded by Philippe Graffin on Hyperion (CDA67838) with the BBC National Orchestra of Wales conducted by David Lloyd-Jones.

In 2014 and 2015 Christopher Fifield led the Lambeth Orchestra in performances of the Coronation March and Symphony No. 2 in E minor that were subsequently released privately.
