= Claire Seymour =

English educator, violinist, and music reviewer

- Born: August 1970; London, England
- Died: 10 February 2024 (aged 53)
- Occupations: Educator; Music reviewer; Violinist

Claire Seymour (August 1970 – 10 February 2024) was an English educator, violinist and music reviewer. She worked at the University of Tokyo as visiting lecturer in British Studies, Queen's College, London as head of the Senior College and Open University as an associate professor in both the Music and English Literature departments. Seymour was a reviewer for music websites and publications such as Opera Today, Seen and Heard International, MusicWeb International, British Theatre Guide and The Stage.

== Biography ==
Seymour was born in August 1970, in London. She had a brother and was raised in Broadstairs in Kent, where her parents Barbara and Richard ran a convenience store. Seymour was educated at Clarendon House Grammar School for Girls in Ramsgate, where she was a member of the junior guitar group and was a member of the Margate Operatic Society. She went to King's College, Cambridge, reading music. Following her graduation from the university in 1991, Seymour enrolled at the University of Kent. She completed a Master of Arts in modern literature and a Doctor of Philosophy degree in English literature, researching the relationship of Benjamin Britten with his librettists and poets.

From 1999 and 2000, Seymour was the first woman to be appointed visiting lecturer in British studies at the University of Tokyo and lasted in the post for two years. She later began her teaching career that lasted from 2002 to 2017, when she worked at Dover College in Kent. Seymour then worked as head of the Senior College at Queen's College, London, mentoring students through applications for university. She was an associate professor at the Open University in both the Music and English Literature departments from 2006, conducting Summer music classes and was a tutor at the Rose Bruford College on its postgraduate opera studies course. She was also head of postgraduate studies at the London Contemporary Dance School.

In 2008, Seymour joined Opera Today as a reviewer, and became the magazine's British editor in 2012. She also wrote for other music websites and publications such as Seen and Heard International, MusicWeb International, British Theatre Guide and The Stage. She published the thesis The Operas of Benjamin Britten: Expression and Evasion that analyses all of Britten's operas in 2004. Seymour was a specialist on Thomas Hardy and was a contributor and later editor of The Thomas Hardy Society Journals from 2005 to 2009. She edited Wordsworth editions of Hardy and Henry James as well as Plumbago’s Defining Opera series and authored programme articles for Glyndebourne and Wexford. Seymour had appeared on Music Matters on BBC Radio 3. She was also a semi-professional violinist. Seymour was part of the Oare String Orchestra for 28 years and was a member of both the Kent Concert Orchestra and the Peycelon Quartet. She frequently accompanied choral societies, performing with the Lambeth Orchestra.

== Personal life ==
Seymour died at her home on 10 February 2024, having been unwell since January 2024.
