= Kathleen Ferrier =

English singer (1912–1953)

Kathleen Ferrier CBE
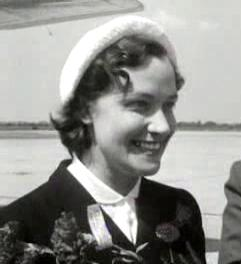
- Ferrier in 1951
- Born: 22 April 1912; Higher Walton, Lancashire, England
- Died: 8 October 1953 (aged 41); London, England
- Occupation: Contralto singer
- Spouse: Albert Wilson (m. 1935; div. 1947)

Kathleen Mary Ferrier CBE (22 April 1912 – 8 October 1953) was an English contralto singer who achieved an international reputation as a stage, concert and recording artist, with a repertoire extending from folksong and popular ballads to the classical works of Bach, Brahms, Mahler and Elgar. Her death from cancer, at the height of her fame, was a shock to the musical world and particularly to the general public, which was kept in ignorance of the nature of her illness until after her death.

The daughter of a Lancashire village schoolmaster, Ferrier showed early talent as a pianist, and won numerous amateur piano competitions while working as a telephonist with the General Post Office. She did not take up singing seriously until 1937, when after winning a prestigious singing competition at the Carlisle Festival she began to receive offers of professional engagements as a vocalist. Thereafter she took singing lessons, first with J. E. Hutchinson and later with Roy Henderson. Following the outbreak of the Second World War Ferrier was recruited by the Council for the Encouragement of Music and the Arts (CEMA), and in the following years sang at concerts and recitals throughout the UK. In 1942 her career was boosted when she met the conductor Malcolm Sargent, who recommended her to the influential Ibbs and Tillett concert management agency. She became a regular performer at leading London and provincial venues, and made numerous BBC radio broadcasts.

In 1946 Ferrier made her stage debut in the Glyndebourne Festival premiere of Benjamin Britten's opera The Rape of Lucretia. A year later she made her first appearance as Orfeo in Gluck's Orfeo ed Euridice, a work with which she became particularly associated. By her own choice, these were her only two operatic roles. As her reputation grew, Ferrier formed close working relationships with major musical figures, including Britten, Sir John Barbirolli, Bruno Walter and the accompanist Gerald Moore. She became known internationally through her three tours to the United States between 1948 and 1950 and her many visits to continental Europe.

Ferrier was diagnosed with breast cancer in March 1951. In between periods of hospitalisation and convalescence she continued to perform and record; her final public appearance was as Orfeo, at the Royal Opera House in February 1953, eight months before her death. Among her many memorials, the Kathleen Ferrier Cancer Research Fund was launched in May 1954. The Kathleen Ferrier Scholarship Fund, administered by the Royal Philharmonic Society, has since 1956 made annual awards to aspiring young professional singers.

== Early life ==
=== Childhood ===
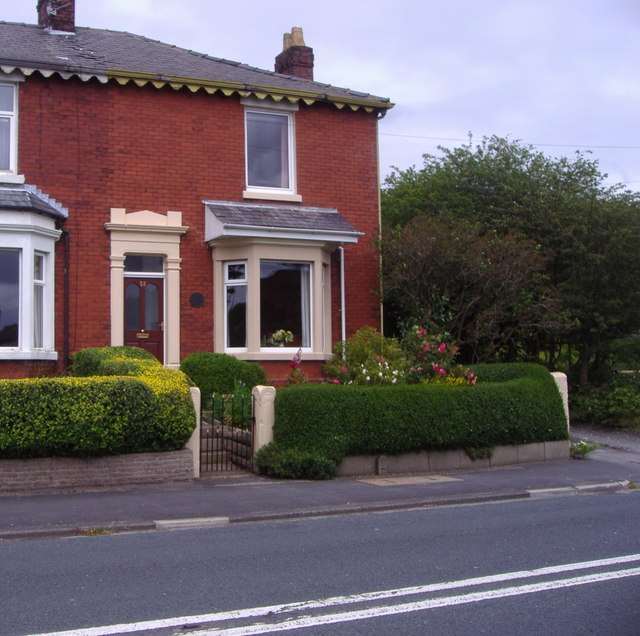
Kathleen Ferrier's birthplace in Higher Walton

The Ferrier family originally came from Pembrokeshire in South West Wales. The Lancashire branch originated in the 19th century, when Thomas Ferrier (youngest son of Private Thomas Ferrier of the Pembrokeshire Regiment) settled in the area after being stationed near Blackburn during a period of industrial unrest. Kathleen Ferrier was born on 22 April 1912, in the Lancashire village of Higher Walton where her father William Ferrier (the fourth child of Thomas and Elizabeth, née Gorton) was the head of the village school. Although untrained musically, William was an enthusiastic member of the local operatic society and of several choirs, and his wife Alice (née Murray), whom he married in 1900, was a competent singer with a strong contralto voice. Kathleen was the third and youngest of the couple's children, following a sister and a brother; when she was two the family moved to Blackburn, after William was appointed headmaster of St Paul's School in the town. From an early age Kathleen showed promise as a pianist, and had lessons with Frances Walker, a noted North of England piano teacher who had been a pupil of Tobias Matthay. Kathleen's talent developed quickly; in 1924, she came fourth out of 43 entrants at the Lytham St Annes Festival piano competition, and in the following year at Lytham she achieved second place.

=== Telephonist and pianist ===
Because of William's impending retirement and the consequent fall in the family's income, Ferrier's hopes of attending a music college could not be realised. In August 1926, she left school to start work as a trainee at the GPO telephone exchange in Blackburn. She continued her piano studies under Frances Walker, and in November 1928 was the regional winner in a national contest for young pianists, organised by the Daily Express. Although unsuccessful in the London finals which followed, Ferrier won a Cramer upright piano as a prize.

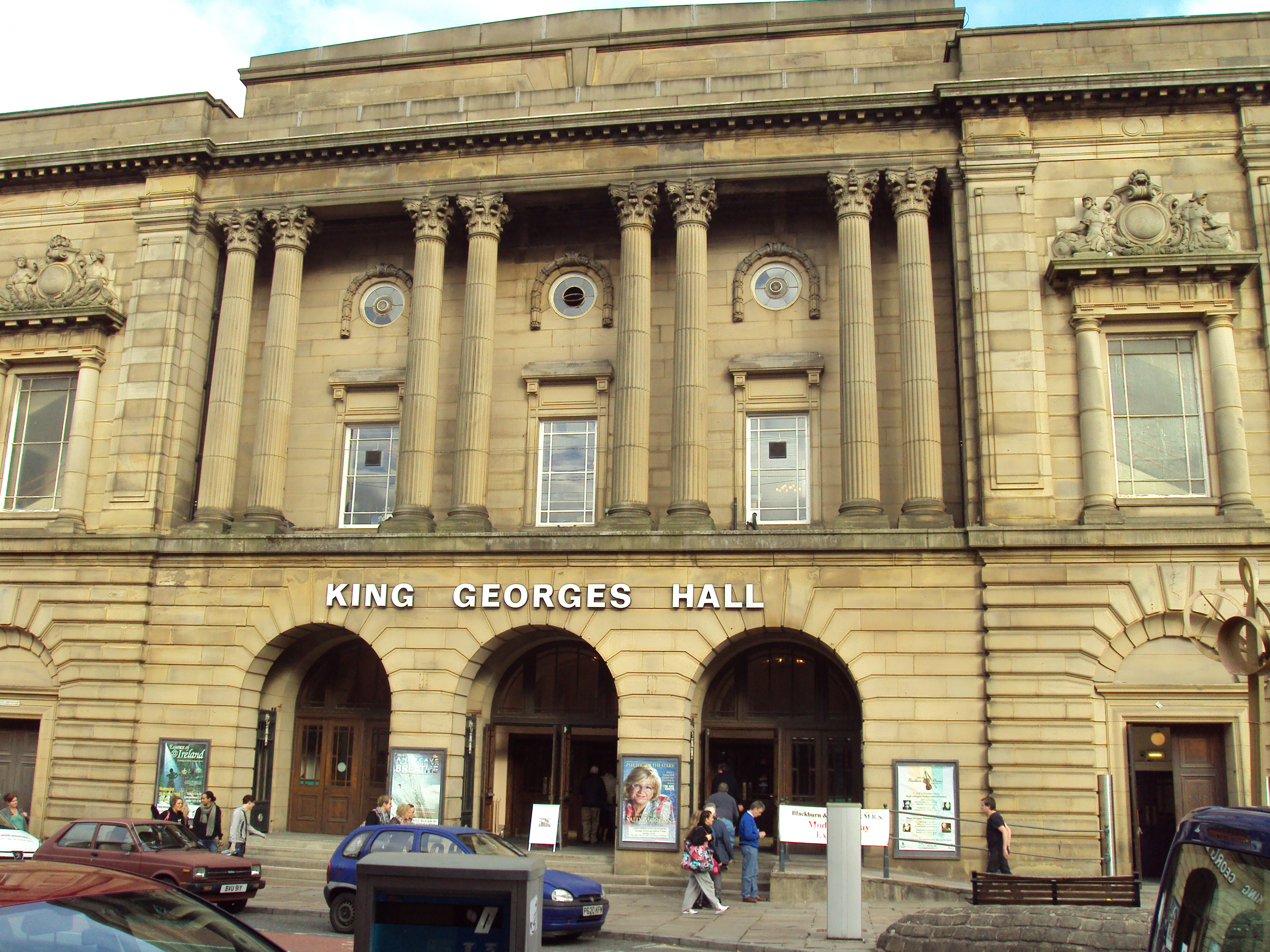
King George's Hall, Blackburn, where Ferrier made early appearances as an accompanist at "celebrity" concerts

On 10 March 1929, she made a well-received appearance as an accompanist in a concert at Blackburn's King George's Hall. After further piano competition successes, she was invited to perform a short radio recital at the Manchester studios of the BBC, and on 3 July 1930 made her first broadcast, playing works by Brahms and Percy Grainger. Around this time she completed her training and she became a fully fledged telephonist.

In 1931, aged 19, Ferrier passed her Licentiate examinations at the Royal Academy of Music. In that year she started occasional singing lessons, and in December sang a small alto role in a church performance of Mendelssohn's oratorio Elijah. However, her voice was not thought to be exceptional; her musical life centred on the piano and on local concerts, at King George's Hall and elsewhere. Early in 1934 she transferred to the Blackpool telephone exchange and took lodgings nearby, to be close to her new boyfriend, a bank clerk named Albert Wilson. While at Blackpool she auditioned for the new "speaking clock" service which the GPO was preparing to introduce. In her excitement, Ferrier inserted an extra aspirate into her audition, and was not chosen for the final selection in London. Her decision in 1935 to marry Wilson meant the end of her employment with the telephone exchange, since at that time the GPO did not employ married women. Of Ferrier's career to this point, the music biographer Humphrey Burton wrote: "For more than a decade, when she should have been studying music with the best teachers, learning English literature and foreign languages, acquiring stage craft and movement skills, and travelling to London regularly to see opera, Miss Ferrier was actually answering the telephone, getting married to a bank manager and winning tinpot competitions for her piano-playing."

=== Marriage ===
Ferrier met Albert Wilson in 1933, probably through dancing, which they both loved. When she announced that they were to marry, her family and friends had strong reservations, on the grounds that she was young and inexperienced, and that she and Wilson shared few serious interests. Nevertheless, the marriage took place on 19 November 1935. Shortly afterwards the couple moved to Silloth, a small port town in Cumberland, where Wilson had been appointed as manager of his bank's branch. The marriage was not successful; the honeymoon had revealed problems of sexual incompatibility, and the union remained unconsummated. Outward appearances were maintained for a few years, until Wilson's departure for military service in 1940 effectively ended the marriage. The couple divorced in 1947, though they remained on good terms. Wilson subsequently married a friend of Ferrier's, Wyn Hetherington; he died in 1969.

== Early singing career ==
In 1937 Ferrier entered the Carlisle Festival open piano competition and, as a result of a small bet with her husband, also signed up for the singing contest. She won the piano trophy; in the singing finals she sang Roger Quilter's To Daisies, a performance which earned her the festival's top vocal award. Ferrier was awarded a special rose bowl as champion of the festival.

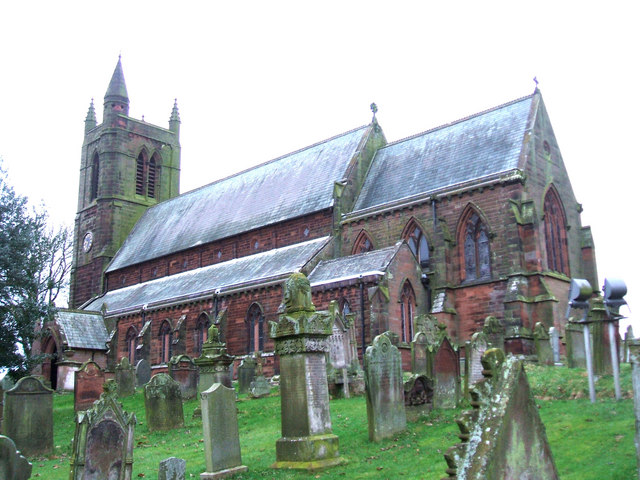
St Kentigern's Church at Aspatria, Cumbria, the scene of Ferrier's first professional singing engagement in 1937

After her Carlisle victories, Ferrier began to receive offers of singing engagements. Her first appearance as a professional vocalist, in autumn 1937, was at a harvest festival celebration in the village church at Aspatria. She was paid one guinea. (Note: Winifred Ferrier gives the fee as one guinea. Leonard suggests that Ferrier received the lower sum of seven shillings and sixpence.) After winning the gold cup at the 1938 Workington Festival, Ferrier sang "Ma Curly-Headed Babby" in a concert at Workington Opera House. Cecil McGivern, producer of a BBC Northern radio variety show, was in the audience and was sufficiently impressed to book her for the next edition of his programme, which was broadcast from Newcastle on 23 February 1939. This broadcast—her first as a vocalist—attracted wide attention, and led to more radio work, though for Ferrier the event was overshadowed by the death of her mother at the beginning of February. At the 1939 Carlisle Festival, Ferrier sang Richard Strauss's song All Souls' Day, a performance which particularly impressed one of the adjudicators, J. E. Hutchinson, a music teacher with a considerable reputation. Ferrier became his pupil and, under his guidance, began to extend her repertoire to include works by Bach, Handel, Brahms and Elgar.

When Albert Wilson joined the army in 1940, Ferrier reverted to her maiden name, having until then sung as 'Kathleen Wilson'. In December 1940, she appeared for the first time professionally as 'Kathleen Ferrier' in a performance of Handel's Messiah, under Hutchinson's direction. In early 1941 she successfully auditioned as a singer with the Council for the Encouragement of the Arts (CEMA), which provided concerts and other entertainments to military camps, factories and other workplaces. Within this organisation Ferrier began working with artists with international reputations; in December 1941, she sang with the Hallé Orchestra in a performance of Messiah together with Isobel Baillie, the distinguished soprano. However, her application to the BBC's head of music in Manchester for an audition was turned down. Ferrier had better fortune when she was introduced to Malcolm Sargent after a Hallé concert in Blackpool. Sargent agreed to hear her sing, and afterwards recommended her to Ibbs and Tillett, the London-based concert management agency. John Tillett accepted her as a client without hesitation after which, on Sargent's advice, Ferrier decided to base herself in London. On 24 December 1942, she moved with her sister Winifred into a flat in Frognal Mansions, Hampstead.

== Stardom ==
=== Growing reputation ===
Ferrier gave her first London recital on 28 December 1942 at the National Gallery, in a lunch-time concert organised by Dame Myra Hess. Although she wrote "went off very well" in her diary, Ferrier was disappointed with her performance, and concluded that she needed further voice training. She approached the distinguished baritone Roy Henderson with whom, a week previously, she had sung in Mendelssohn's Elijah. Henderson agreed to teach her, and was her regular voice coach for the remainder of her life. He later explained that her "warm and spacious tone" was in part due to the size of the cavity at the back of her throat: "one could have shot a fair-sized apple right to the back of the throat without obstruction". However, this natural physical advantage was not in itself enough to ensure the quality of her voice; this was due, Henderson says, to "her hard work, artistry, sincerity, personality and above all her character".

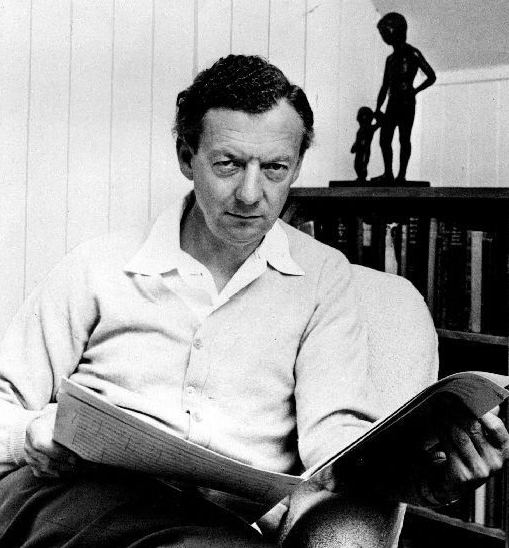
Benjamin Britten in the mid-1960s

On 17 May 1943, Ferrier sang in Handel's Messiah at Westminster Abbey, alongside Isobel Baillie and Peter Pears, with Reginald Jacques conducting. According to the critic Neville Cardus, it was through the quality of her singing here that Ferrier "made her first serious appeal to musicians". Her assured performance led to other important engagements, and to broadcasting work; her increasingly frequent appearances on popular programmes such as Forces Favourites and Housewives' Choice soon gave her national recognition. In May 1944, at EMI's Abbey Road Studios with Gerald Moore as her accompanist, she made test recordings of music by Brahms, Gluck and Elgar. (Note: These first test recordings were not issued until December 1978. They then were included in an LP album called Great British Mezzo Sopranos and Contraltos.) Her first published record, made in September 1944, was issued under the Columbia label; it consisted of two songs by Maurice Greene, again with Moore accompanying. Her time as a Columbia recording artist was brief and unhappy; she had poor relations with her producer, Walter Legge, and after a few months she transferred to Decca.

In the remaining wartime months, Ferrier continued to travel throughout the country, to fulfil the growing demands for her services from concert promoters. At Leeds in November 1944, she sang the part of the Angel in Elgar's choral work The Dream of Gerontius, her first performance in what became one of her best-known roles. In December she met John Barbirolli while working on another Elgar piece, Sea Pictures; the conductor later became one of her closest friends and strongest advocates. On 15 September 1945, Ferrier made her debut at the London Proms, when she sang L'Air des Adieux from Tchaikovsky's opera The Maid of Orleans. Although she often sang individual arias, opera was not Ferrier's natural forte; she had not enjoyed singing the title role in a concert version of Bizet's Carmen at Stourbridge in March 1944, and generally avoided similar engagements. Nevertheless, Benjamin Britten, who had heard her Westminster Abbey Messiah performance, persuaded her to create the role of Lucretia in his new opera The Rape of Lucretia, which was to open the first postwar Glyndebourne Festival in 1946. She would share the part with Nancy Evans. Despite her initial misgivings, by early July Ferrier was writing to her agent that she was "enjoying [the rehearsals] tremendously and I should think it's the best part one could possibly have".

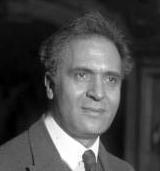
Bruno Walter, the German-born conductor with whom Ferrier worked closely from 1947 until her death

Ferrier's performances in the Glyndebourne run, which began on 12 July 1946, earned her favourable reviews, although the opera itself was less well received. On the provincial tour which followed the festival it failed to attract the public and incurred heavy financial losses.

By contrast, when the opera reached Amsterdam it was greeted warmly by the Dutch audiences who showed particular enthusiasm for Ferrier's performance. This was Ferrier's first trip abroad, and she wrote an excited letter to her family: "The cleanest houses and windows you ever did see, and flowers in the fields all the way!" Following her success as Lucretia she agreed to return to Glyndebourne in 1947, to sing Orfeo in Gluck's opera Orfeo ed Euridice. She had often sung Orfeo's aria Che farò ("What is life") as a concert piece, and had recently recorded it with Decca. At Glyndebourne, Ferrier's limited acting abilities caused some difficulties in her relationship with the conductor, Fritz Stiedry; nevertheless her performance on the first night, 19 June 1947, attracted warm critical praise.

Ferrier's association with Glyndebourne bore further fruit when Rudolf Bing, the festival's general manager, recommended her to Bruno Walter as the contralto soloist in a performance of Mahler's symphonic song cycle Das Lied von der Erde. This was planned for the 1947 Edinburgh International Festival. Walter was initially wary of working with a relatively new singer, but after her audition his fears were allayed; "I recognised with delight that here potentially was one of the greatest singers of our time", he later wrote. Das Lied von der Erde was at that time largely unknown in Britain, and some critics found it unappealing; nevertheless, the Edinburgh Evening News thought it "simply superb". In a later biographical sketch of Ferrier, Lord Harewood described the partnership between Walter and her, which endured until the singer's final illness, as "a rare match of music, voice and temperament".

=== Career apex, 1948–51 ===
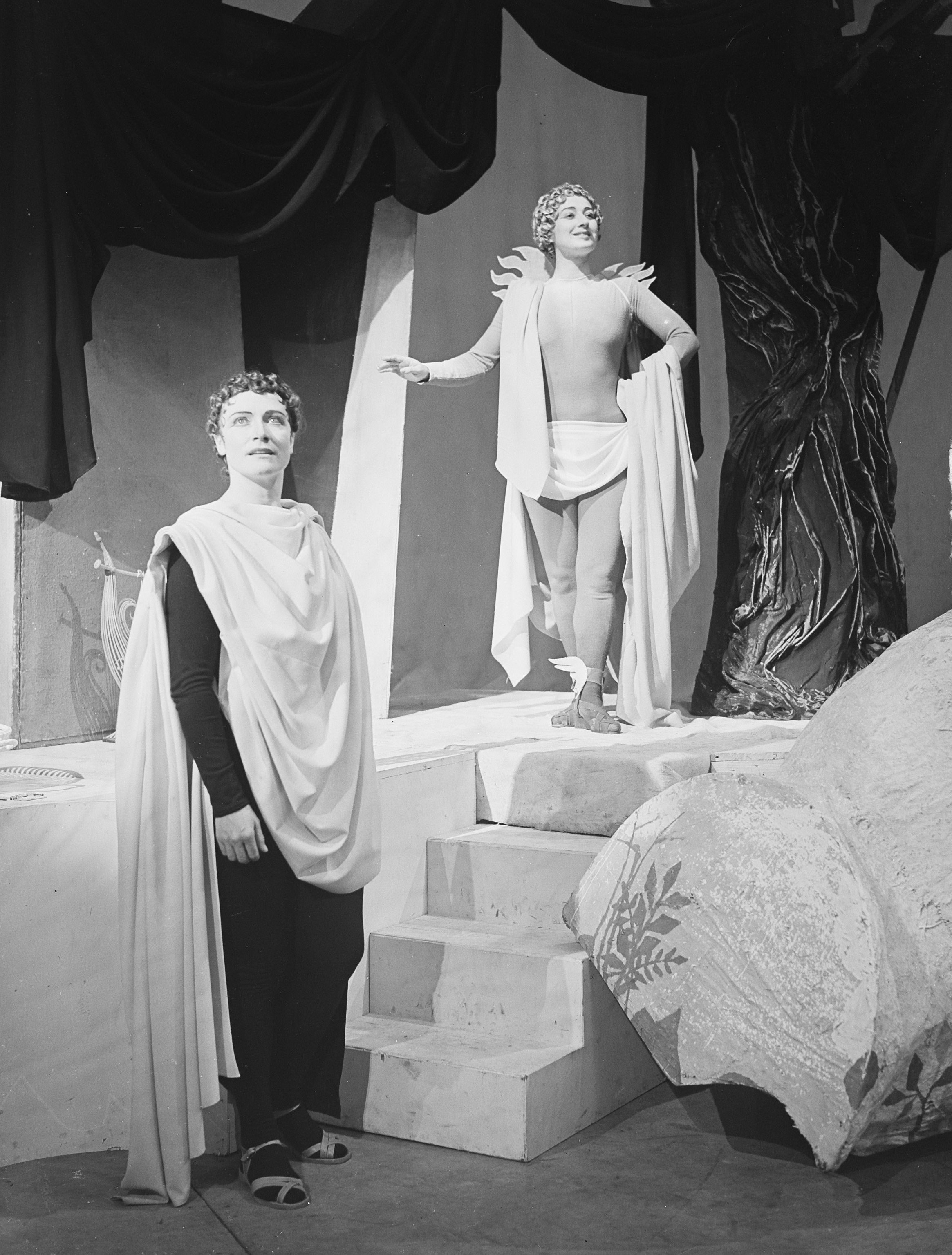
Ferrier in Orfeo ed Eurydice (1949)

On 1 January 1948, Ferrier left for a four-week tour of North America, the first of three transatlantic trips she would make during the next three years. In New York City, she sang two performances of Das Lied von der Erde, with Bruno Walter and the New York Philharmonic. Alma Mahler, the composer's widow, was present at the first of these, on 15 January. (Note: Leonard wrongly refers to Alma Mahler as "the composer's daughter". Ferrier met Anna Mahler, the composer's daughter, at a reception after the concert.) In a letter written the following day, Ferrier told her sister: "Some of the critics are enthusiastic, others unimpressed". After the second performance, which was broadcast from coast to coast, Ferrier gave recitals in Ottawa and Chicago before returning to New York and embarking for home on 4 February.

During 1948, amid many engagements, Ferrier performed Brahms's Alto Rhapsody at the Proms in August, and sang in Bach's Mass in B minor at that year's Edinburgh Festival. On 13 October 1948, she joined Barbirolli and the Hallé Orchestra in a broadcast performance of Mahler's song cycle Kindertotenlieder. She returned to the Netherlands in January 1949 for a series of recitals, then left Southampton on 18 February 1949 to begin her second American tour. This opened in New York with a concert performance of Orfeo ed Euridice that won uniform critical praise from the New York critics. On the tour which followed, her accompanist was Arpád Sándor (1896–1972), who was suffering from a depressive illness that badly affected his playing. Unaware of his problem, in letters home, Ferrier berated "this abominable accompanist" who deserved "a kick in the pants". When she found out that he had been ill for months, she turned her fury on the tour's promoters: "What a blinking nerve to palm him on to me". Eventually, when Sándor was too ill to appear, Ferrier was able to recruit a Canadian pianist, John Newmark, with whom she formed a warm and lasting working relationship.

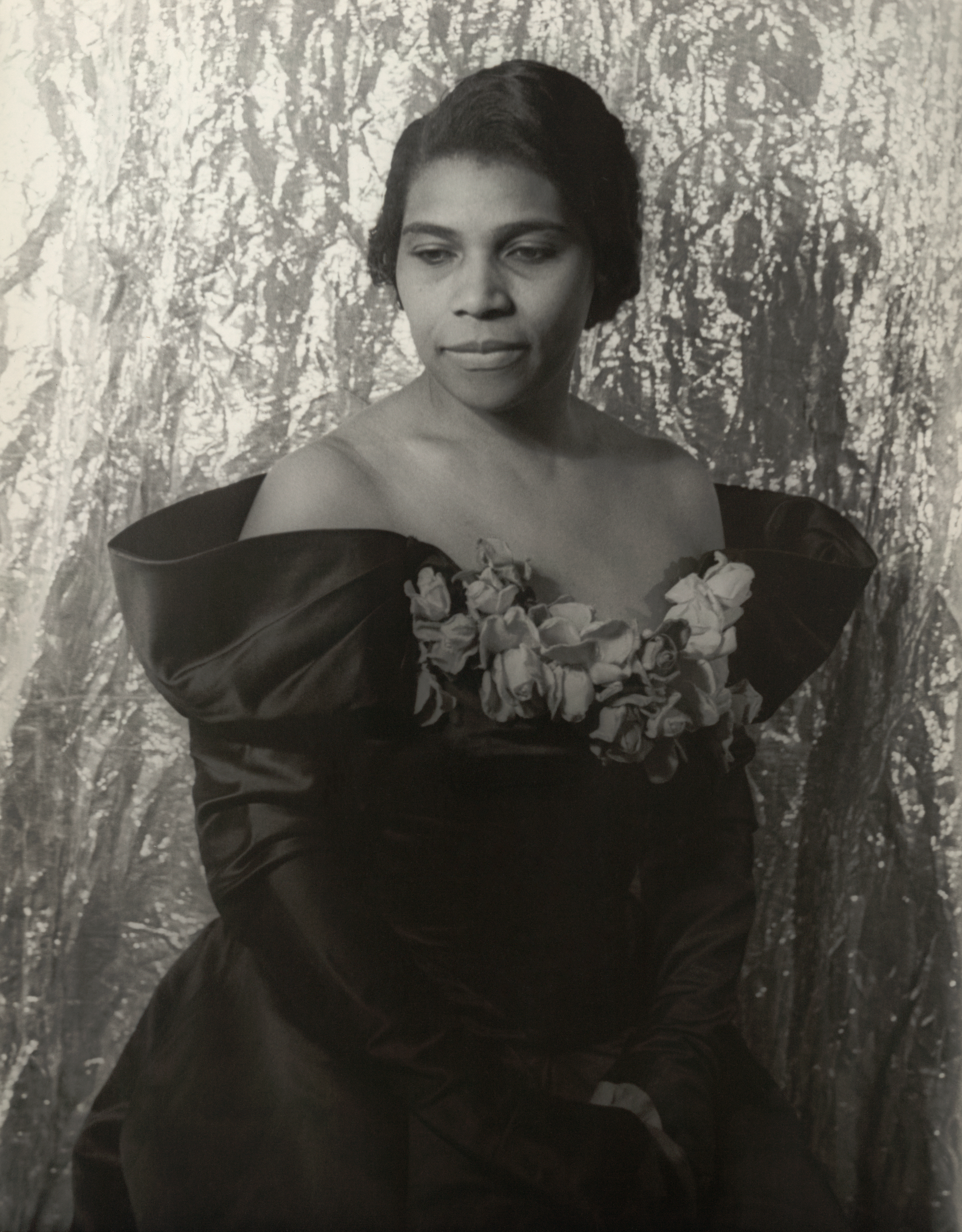
Marian Anderson, who said of Ferrier: "What a voice—and what a face!"

Shortly after her return to Britain early in June 1949, Ferrier left for Amsterdam where, on 14 July, she sang in the world premiere of Britten's Spring Symphony, with Eduard van Beinum and the Concertgebouw Orchestra. Britten had written this work specifically for her. At the Edinburgh Festival in September she gave two recitals in which Bruno Walter acted as her piano accompanist. Ferrier felt that these recitals represented "a peak to which I had been groping for the last three years". A broadcast of one of the recitals was issued on record many years later; of this, the critic Alan Blyth wrote: "Walter's very personal and positive support obviously pushes Ferrier to give of her very best".

The following 18 months saw almost uninterrupted activity, encompassing a number of visits to continental Europe and a third American tour between December 1949 and April 1950. This American trip broke new ground for Ferrier—the West Coast—and included three performances in San Francisco of Orfeo ed Euridice, with Pierre Monteux conducting. At the rehearsals Ferrier met the renowned American contralto Marian Anderson, who reportedly said of her English counterpart: "My God, what a voice—and what a face!" On Ferrier's return home the hectic pace continued, with a rapid succession of concerts in Amsterdam, London and Edinburgh followed by a tour of Austria, Switzerland and Italy. In Vienna, the soprano Elisabeth Schwarzkopf was Ferrier's co-soloist in a recorded performance of Bach's Mass in B minor, with the Vienna Symphony under Herbert von Karajan. Schwarzkopf later recalled Ferrier's singing of the Agnus Dei from the Mass as her highlight of the year.

Early in 1951, while on tour in Rome, Ferrier learned of her father's death at the age of 83. Although she was upset by this news, she decided to continue with the tour; her diary entry for 30 January reads: "My Pappy died peacefully after flu and a slight stroke". She returned to London on 19 February, and was immediately busy rehearsing with Barbirolli and the Hallé a work that was new to her: Ernest Chausson's Poème de l'amour et de la mer. This was performed at Manchester on 28 February, to critical acclaim. Two weeks later Ferrier discovered a lump on her breast. She nevertheless fulfilled several engagements in Germany, the Netherlands and at Glyndebourne before seeing her doctor on 24 March. After tests at University College Hospital, cancer of the breast was diagnosed, and a mastectomy was performed on 10 April. All immediate engagements were cancelled; among these was a planned series of performances of The Rape of Lucretia by the English Opera Group, scheduled as part of the 1951 Festival of Britain.

== Later career ==
=== Failing health ===
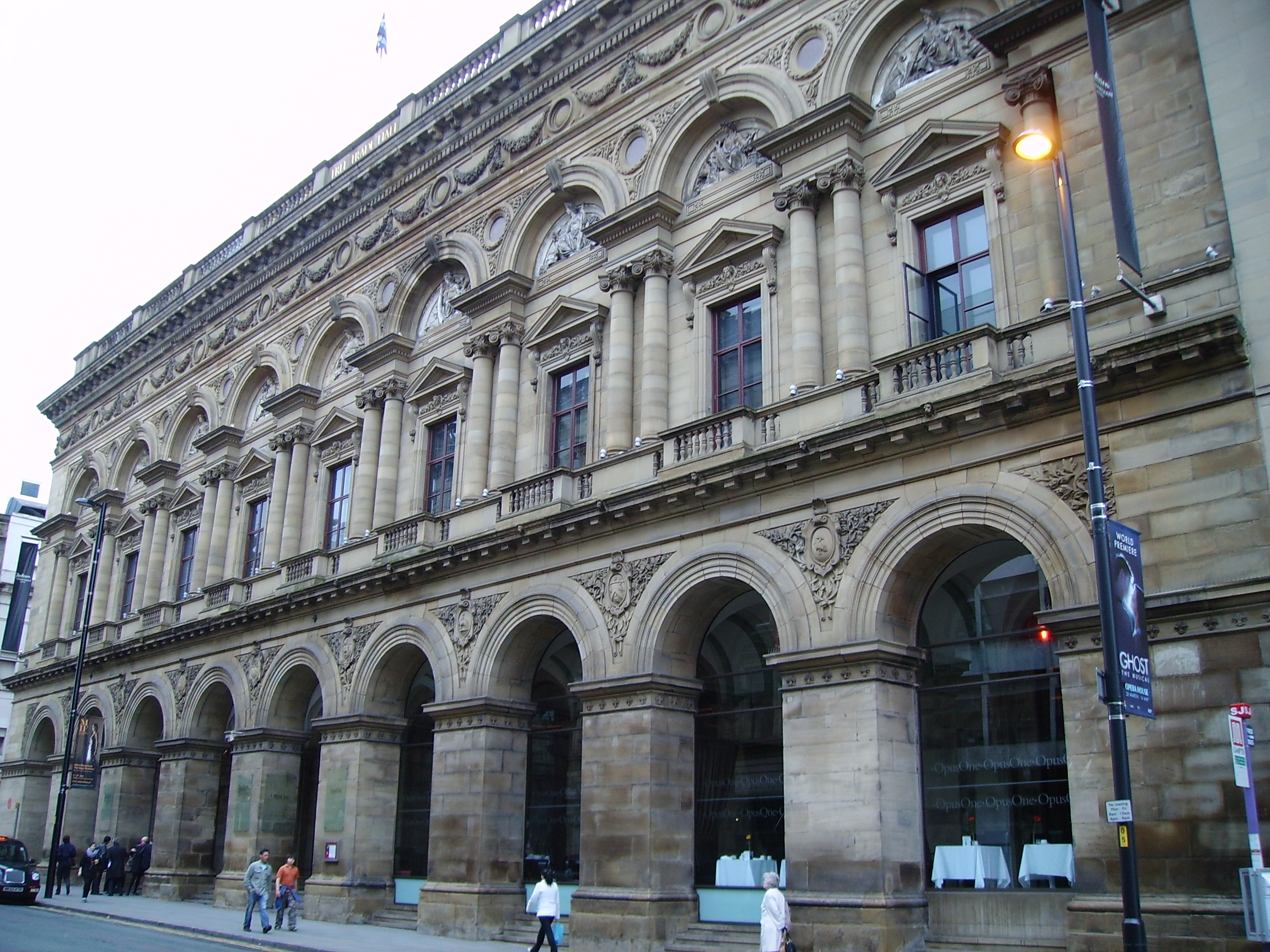
Manchester's Free Trade Hall, where Ferrier sang "Land of Hope and Glory" at its reopening after war damage, on 16 November 1951

Ferrier resumed performing on 19 June 1951, in the Mass in B minor at the Royal Albert Hall. She then made her usual visit to the Holland Festival, where she gave four performances of Orfeo, and sang in Mahler's Second Symphony with Otto Klemperer and the Concertgebouw Orchestra. Through the summer her concert schedule was interspersed with hospital visits; however, she was well enough to sing at the Edinburgh Festival in September, where she performed two recitals with Walter and sang Chausson's Poème with Barbirolli and the Hallé. In November, she sang "Land of Hope and Glory" at the reopening of Manchester's Free Trade Hall, a climax to the evening which, wrote Barbirolli, "moved everyone, not least the conductor, to tears". After this, Ferrier rested for two months while she underwent radiation therapy; her only work engagement during December was a three-day recording session of folk songs at the Decca studios.

In January 1952, Ferrier joined Britten and Pears in a short series of concerts to raise funds for Britten's English Opera Group, including the premiere of Britten's Canticle II: Abraham and Isaac. Writing later, Britten recalled this tour as "perhaps the loveliest of all" of his artistic associations with Ferrier. Despite continuing health problems, she sang in Bach's St Matthew Passion at the Royal Albert Hall on 30 March, Messiah at the Free Trade Hall on 13 April, and Das Lied von der Erde with Barbirolli and the Hallé on 23 and 24 April. On 30 April Ferrier attended a private party at which the new Queen, Elizabeth II, and her sister, Princess Margaret, were present. (Note: Elizabeth II had succeeded to the throne on the death of her father, King George VI, on 6 February 1952. Ferrier's diary entry for 6 February reads "The King died", and notes the postponement of a broadcast she was due to make that day.) In her diary, Ferrier notes: "Princess M sang—very good!". Her health continued to deteriorate; she refused to consider a course of androgen injections, believing that this treatment would destroy the quality of her voice. In May 1952, she travelled to Vienna to record Das Lied and Mahler's Rückert-Lieder with Walter and the Vienna Philharmonic; singer and conductor had long sought to preserve their partnership on disc. Despite considerable suffering, Ferrier completed the recording sessions between 15 and 20 May.

During the remainder of 1952, Ferrier attended her seventh successive Edinburgh Festival, singing in performances of Mahler's Das Lied, The Dream of Gerontius, Messiah and some Brahms songs. She undertook several studio recording sessions, including a series of Bach and Handel arias with Sir Adrian Boult and the London Philharmonic Orchestra in October. In November, after a Royal Festival Hall recital, she was distressed by a review in which Neville Cardus criticised her performance for introducing "distracting extra vocal appeals" designed to please the audience at the expense of the songs. However, she accepted his comments with good grace, remarking that "... it's hard to please everybody—for years I've been criticised for being a colourless, monotonous singer". In December she sang in the BBC's Christmas Messiah, the last time she would perform this work. On New Year's Day 1953, she was appointed a Commander of the Order of the British Empire (CBE) in the Queen's New Year Honours List.

=== Final performances, illness and death ===
As 1953 began, Ferrier was busy rehearsing for Orpheus, an English language version of Orfeo ed Euridice to be staged in four performances at the Royal Opera House in February. Barbirolli had instigated this project, with Ferrier's enthusiastic approval, some months previously. Her only other engagement in January was a BBC recital recording, in which she sang works by three living English composers: Howard Ferguson, William Wordsworth and Edmund Rubbra. During her regular hospital treatment, she discussed with doctors the advisability of an oophorectomy (removal of the ovaries), but on learning that the impact on her cancer would probably be insignificant and that her voice might be badly affected, she chose not to have the operation.

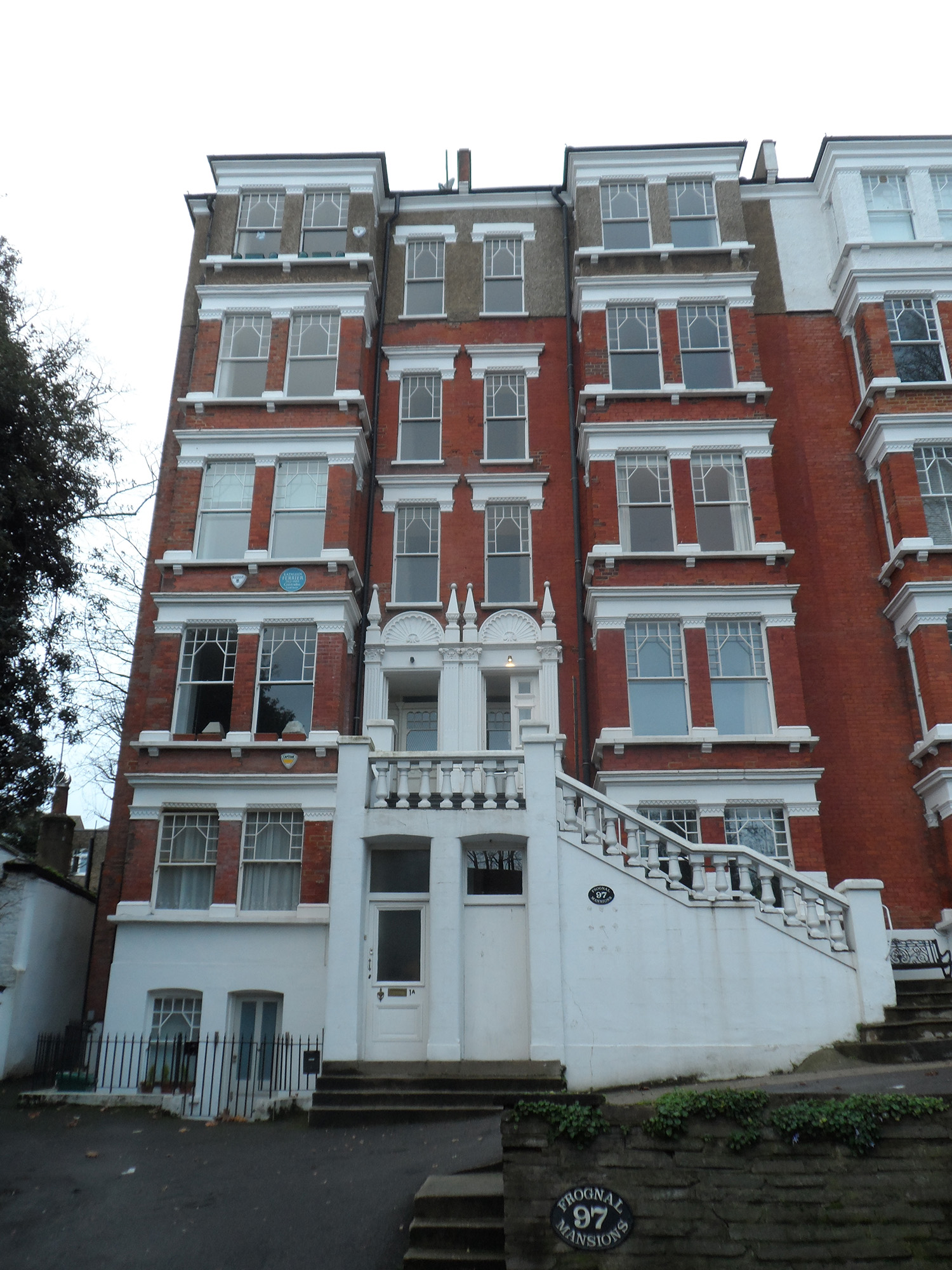
Frognal Mansions

The first Orpheus performance, on 3 February, was greeted with unanimous critical approval. According to Barbirolli, Ferrier was particularly pleased with one critic's comment that her movements were as graceful as any of those of the dancers on stage. However, she was physically weakened from her prolonged radiation treatment; during the second performance, three days later, her left femur partially disintegrated. Quick action by other cast members, who moved to support her, kept the audience in ignorance. Although virtually immobilised, Ferrier sang her remaining arias and took her curtain calls before being transferred to hospital. This proved to be her final public appearance; the two remaining performances, at first rescheduled for April, were eventually cancelled. Still the general public remained unaware of the nature of Ferrier's incapacity; an announcement in The Guardian stated: "Miss Ferrier is suffering from a strain resulting from arthritis which requires immediate further treatment. It has been caused by the physical stress involved in rehearsal and performance of her role in Orpheus".

Ferrier spent two months in University College Hospital. As a result, she missed her CBE investiture; the ribbon was brought to her at the hospital by a friend. Meanwhile, her sister found her a ground-floor apartment in St John's Wood, since she would no longer be able to negotiate the many stairs at Frognal Mansions. She moved to her new home in early April, but after only seven weeks was forced to return to hospital where, despite two further operations, her condition continued to deteriorate. Early in June she heard that she had been awarded the Gold Medal of the Royal Philharmonic Society, the first female vocalist to receive this honour since Muriel Foster in 1914. In a letter to the secretary of the Society she wrote that this "unbelievable, wondrous news has done more than anything to make me feel so much better". This letter, dated 9 June, is probably the last that Ferrier signed herself. (Note: Winifred Ferrier says of this letter: "Kathleen dictated her reply and signed it herself". All subsequently dated letters in Fifield's Letters and Diaries are written and signed by Bernadine Hammond, Ferrier's assistant.) As she weakened she saw only her sister and a few very close friends, and, although there were short periods of respite, her decline was unremitting. She died at University College Hospital on 8 October 1953, aged 41; the date for which, while still hopeful of recovery, she had undertaken to sing Frederick Delius's A Mass of Life at the 1953 Leeds Festival. Ferrier was cremated a few days later, at Golders Green Crematorium, after a short private service. She left an estate worth £15,134 (equivalent to £367,091 in 2025), which her biographer Maurice Leonard observes was "not a fortune for a world-famous singer, even by the standards of the day".

== Assessment and legacy ==
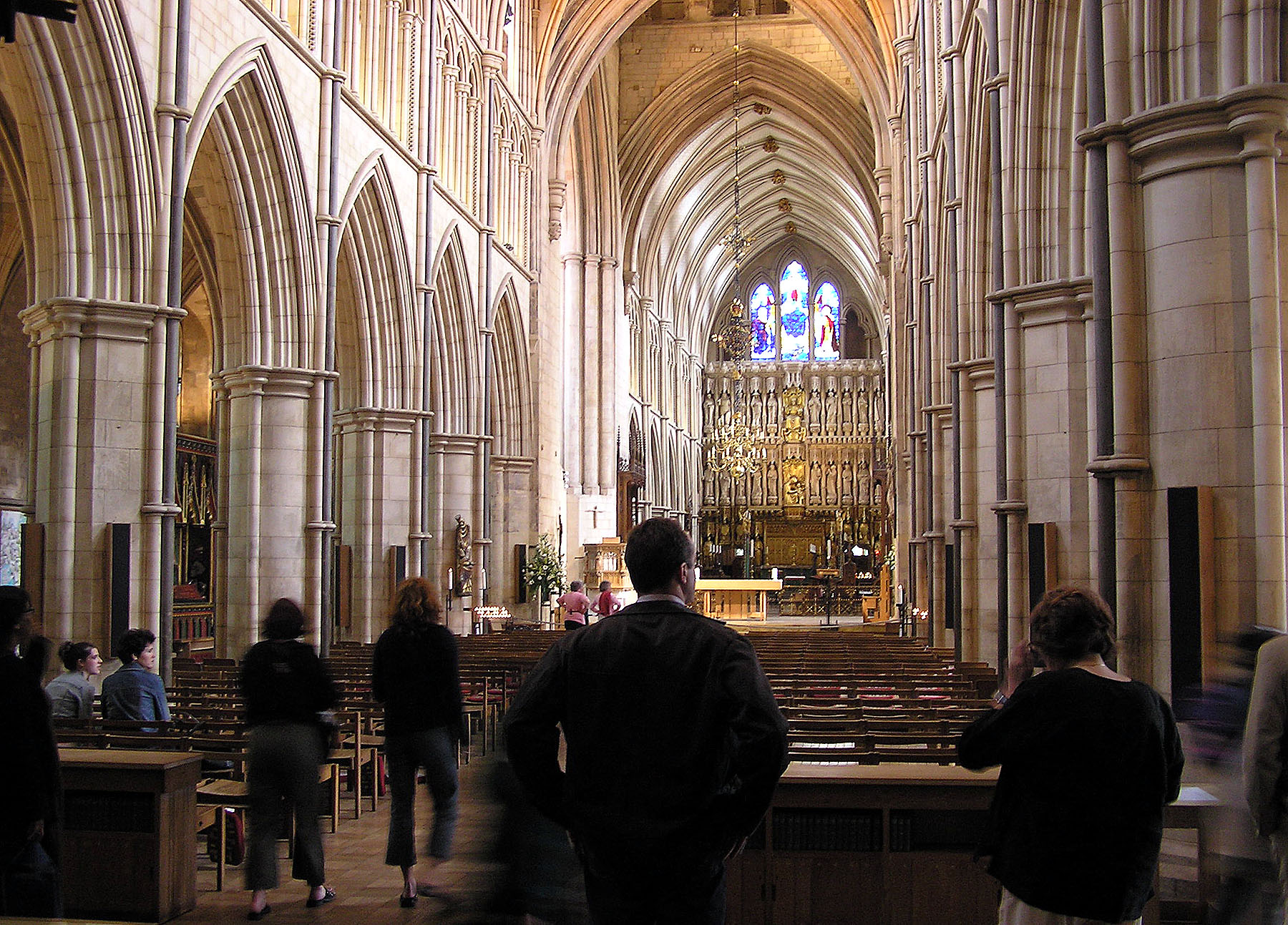
Southwark Cathedral, where Ferrier's memorial service was held on 14 November 1953

The news of Ferrier's death came as a considerable shock to the public. Although some in musical circles knew or suspected the truth, the myth had been preserved that her absence from the concert scene was temporary. (Note: On 23 May 1953 a local newspaper, the West Somerset Free Press, apologised to its readers for having, in an earlier report, suggested that Ferrier's career was over. "We are now informed that although Miss Ferrier has been ill her incapacity is purely temporary and will in no way affect her return to professional activity.") The opera critic Rupert Christiansen, writing as the 50th anniversary of Ferrier's death approached, maintained that "no singer in this country has ever been more deeply loved, as much for the person she was as for the voice she uttered". Her death, he continued, "quite literally shattered the euphoria of the Coronation" (which had taken place on 2 June 1953). Ian Jack, editor of Granta, believed that she "may well have been the most celebrated woman in Britain after the Queen." Among the many tributes from her colleagues, that of Bruno Walter has been highlighted by biographers: "The greatest thing in music in my life has been to have known Kathleen Ferrier and Gustav Mahler—in that order." Very few singers, Lord Harewood writes, "have earned so powerful a valedictory from so senior a colleague." At a memorial service at Southwark Cathedral on 14 November 1953, the Bishop of Croydon, in his eulogy, said of Ferrier's voice: "She seemed to bring into this world a radiance from another world."

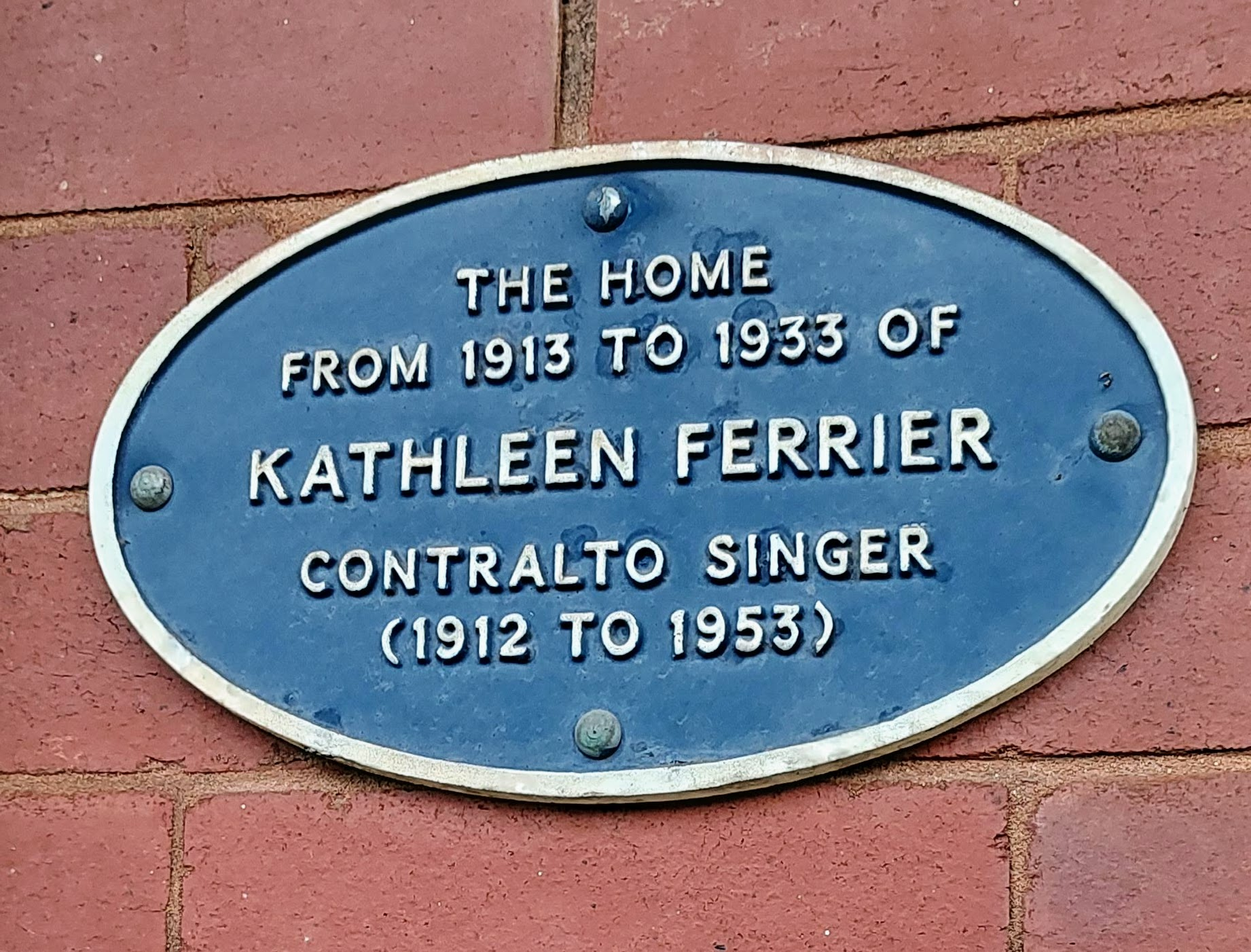
Blue plaque in Blackburn

From time to time commentators have speculated on the directions Ferrier's career might have taken had she lived. In 1951, while recovering from her mastectomy, she received an offer to sing the part of Brangäne in Wagner's opera Tristan und Isolde at the 1952 Bayreuth Festival. According to Christiansen she would have been "glorious" in the role, and was being equally sought by the Bayreuth management to sing Erda in the Ring cycle. Christiansen further suggests that, given the changes of style over the past 50 years, Ferrier might have been less successful in the 21st century world: "We dislike low-lying voices, for one thing—contraltos now sound freakish and headmistressy, and even the majority of mezzo-sopranos should more accurately be categorised as almost-sopranos". However, she was "a singer of, and for, her time—a time of grief and weariness, national self-respect and a belief in human nobility". In this context "her artistry stands upright, austere, unfussy, fundamental and sincere".

Shortly after Ferrier's death an appeal was launched by Barbirolli, Walter, Myra Hess and others, to establish a cancer research fund in Ferrier's name. Donations were received from all over the world. To publicise the fund a special concert was given at the Royal Festival Hall on 7 May 1954, at which Barbirolli and Walter shared the conducting duties without payment. Among the items was a rendition of Purcell's "When I am laid in earth", which Ferrier had often sung; on this occasion the vocal part was played by a solo cor anglais. The Kathleen Ferrier Cancer Research Fund helped establish the Kathleen Ferrier Chair of Clinical Oncology at University College Hospital, in 1984. As of 2012, it was continuing to fund oncology research.

As the result of a separate appeal, augmented by the sales proceeds of a memoir edited by Neville Cardus, the Kathleen Ferrier Memorial Scholarship Fund was created to encourage young British and Commonwealth singers of either sex. The Fund, which has operated from 1956 under the auspices of the Royal Philharmonic Society, initially provided an annual award covering the cost of a year's study to a single prizewinner. With the advent of additional sponsors, the number and scope of awards has expanded considerably since that time; the list of winners of Ferrier Awards includes many singers of international repute, among them Felicity Palmer, Yvonne Kenny, Lesley Garrett and Bryn Terfel. The Kathleen Ferrier Society, founded in 1993 to promote interest in all aspects of the singer's life and work, has since 1996 awarded annual bursaries to students at Britain's major music colleges. In 2012, the Society organised a series of events to commemorate the centenary of Ferrier's birth and in February 2012 Ferrier was one of ten prominent Britons honoured by the Royal Mail in the "Britons of Distinction" stamps set. Another was Frederick Delius.

A biographic documentary film, Kathleen Ferrier, also known as La vie et l'art de Kathleen Ferrier – Le chant de la terre was directed by Diane Perelsztejn and produced by ARTE France in 2012. It featured interviews with her near relatives, friends and colleagues to produce a fresh view of her life and contributions to the arts. Kathleen Ferrier Crescent, in Basildon, Essex, is named in her honour.

== Recordings ==
Ferrier's discography consists of studio recordings originally made on the Columbia and Decca labels, and recordings taken from live performances which were later issued as discs. In the years since her death, many of her recordings have received multiple reissues on modern media; between 1992 and 1996, Decca issued the Kathleen Ferrier Edition, incorporating much of Ferrier's recorded repertoire, on 10 compact discs. The discographer Paul Campion has drawn attention to numerous works which she performed but did not record, or for which no complete recording has yet surfaced. For example, only one aria from Elgar's Dream of Gerontius, and none of her renderings of 20th century songs by Holst, Bax, Delius and others were recorded. Only a small part of her St John Passion was captured on disc.

The recording of the unaccompanied Northumbrian folk song "Blow the Wind Southerly", initially made by Decca in 1949, has been reissued many times and frequently played on radio in shows such as Desert Island Discs, Housewives' Choice and Your Hundred Best Tunes. Another signature aria, first recorded in 1944 and on numerous subsequent occasions, is "What is Life?" (Che farò) from Orfeo ed Euridice. These records sold in large numbers rivalling those of other stars of the time, such as Frank Sinatra and Dame Vera Lynn. In the early 21st century, Ferrier's recordings were still selling hundreds of thousands of copies each year.

== Notes and references ==
=== Sources ===
- Barbirolli, John (1954). "Kathleen ... The Last Years". In Cardus, Neville (ed.). Kathleen Ferrier: A Memoir. London: Hamish Hamilton.
- Britten, Benjamin (1954). "Three Premieres". In Cardus, Neville (ed.). Kathleen Ferrier: A Memoir. London: Hamish Hamilton.
- Burton, Humphrey (24 April 1988). "The powerful legacy of the Blackburn diva – Review of Kathleen – The Life of Kathleen Ferrier 1912–1953 by Maurice Leonard". The Sunday Times. London.
- Campion, Paul (2005). Ferrier – A Career Recorded. London: Thames Publishing. ISBN 0-903413-71-X.
- Cardus, Neville (1954). "The Girl from Blackburn". In Cardus, Neville (ed.). Kathleen Ferrier: A Memoir. London: Hamish Hamilton.
- Christiansen, Rupert (8 September 2003). "The glory of 'Klever Kaff'". The Daily Telegraph.
- Ferrier, Winifred (1955). The Life of Kathleen Ferrier. London: Hamish Hamilton. OCLC 612023977.
- Fifield, Christopher, ed. (2003). Letters and Diaries of Kathleen Ferrier. Woodbridge, Suffolk: Boydell Press. ISBN 1-84383-012-4.
- Harewood, Earl of (2004). "Ferrier, Kathleen Mary". Oxford Dictionary of National Biography (online ed.). Oxford University Press. doi:10.1093/ref:odnb/33118. (Subscription, Wikipedia Library access or UK public library membership required.)
- Henderson, Roy (1954). "Per Ardua ...". In Cardus, Neville (ed.). Kathleen Ferrier: A Memoir. London: Hamish Hamilton.
- Leonard, Maurice (1988). Kathleen: The Life of Kathleen Ferrier, 1912–1953. London: Hutchinson. ISBN 0-09-173464-9.
- Walter, Bruno (1954). "Farewell". In Cardus, Neville (ed.). Kathleen Ferrier: A Memoir. London: Hamish Hamilton.
