= Fyfield, Milton Lilbourne =

Hamlet in Wiltshire, England

Coordinates: 51.343°N 1.749°W

Fyfield
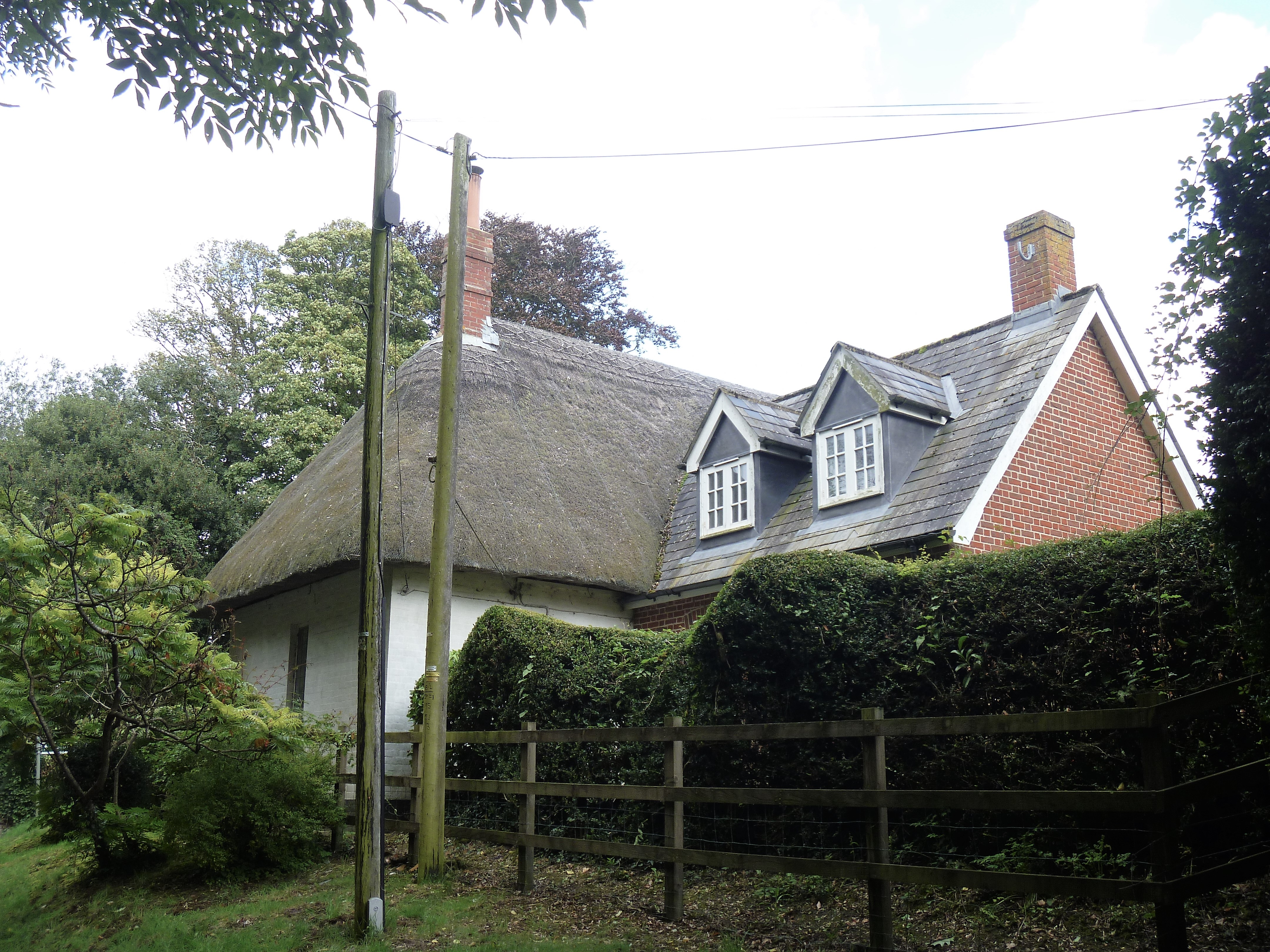
- A house in Fyfield

- Location within Wiltshire
- OS grid reference: SU176605
- Civil parish: Milton Lilbourne
- Unitary authority: Wiltshire
- Ceremonial county: Wiltshire
- Region: South West
- Country: England
- Sovereign state: United Kingdom
- Post town: Pewsey
- Postcode district: SN9
- Dialling code: 01672
- Police: Wiltshire
- Fire: Dorset and Wiltshire
- Ambulance: South Western
- UK Parliament: East Wiltshire

Fyfield is a small hamlet in the civil parish of Milton Lilbourne, in Wiltshire, England, about 1 mile (1.6 km) east of Pewsey.

It is to be distinguished from the larger village of Fyfield, three miles west of Marlborough, also in Wiltshire; the two places are about six miles apart. It should also be distinguished from the hamlet of Fifield, in Enford parish about six miles south of Pewsey.

Fyfield was a tithing of the parish of Milton Lilbourne. It is typical of the strip tithings on the northern edge of Salisbury Plain: it extends from the greensand on the valley floor to the chalk downland of Fyfield Hill (also known as Fyfield Down, but to be distinguished from Fyfield Down on the Marlborough Downs, near the other Fyfield).

Fyfield Manor has parts which date back to the 15th century and is Grade I listed. It was the home of Sir Anthony Eden in the 1960s, then sold in 1966 to Charles Morrison.
