= Fifield =

Fifield may refer to:

== People ==
- Fifield (surname)

== Places ==
=== Australia ===
- Fifield, New South Wales

=== England ===
- Fifield, Berkshire
- Fifield, Oxfordshire
- Fifield, Wiltshire
- Fifield Bavant, Wiltshire

=== United States ===
- Fifield, Wisconsin, a town
- Fifield (community), Wisconsin, an unincorporated community

== See also ==
- Fyfield (disambiguation)
