= The Devil's Den =

Dolmen in England

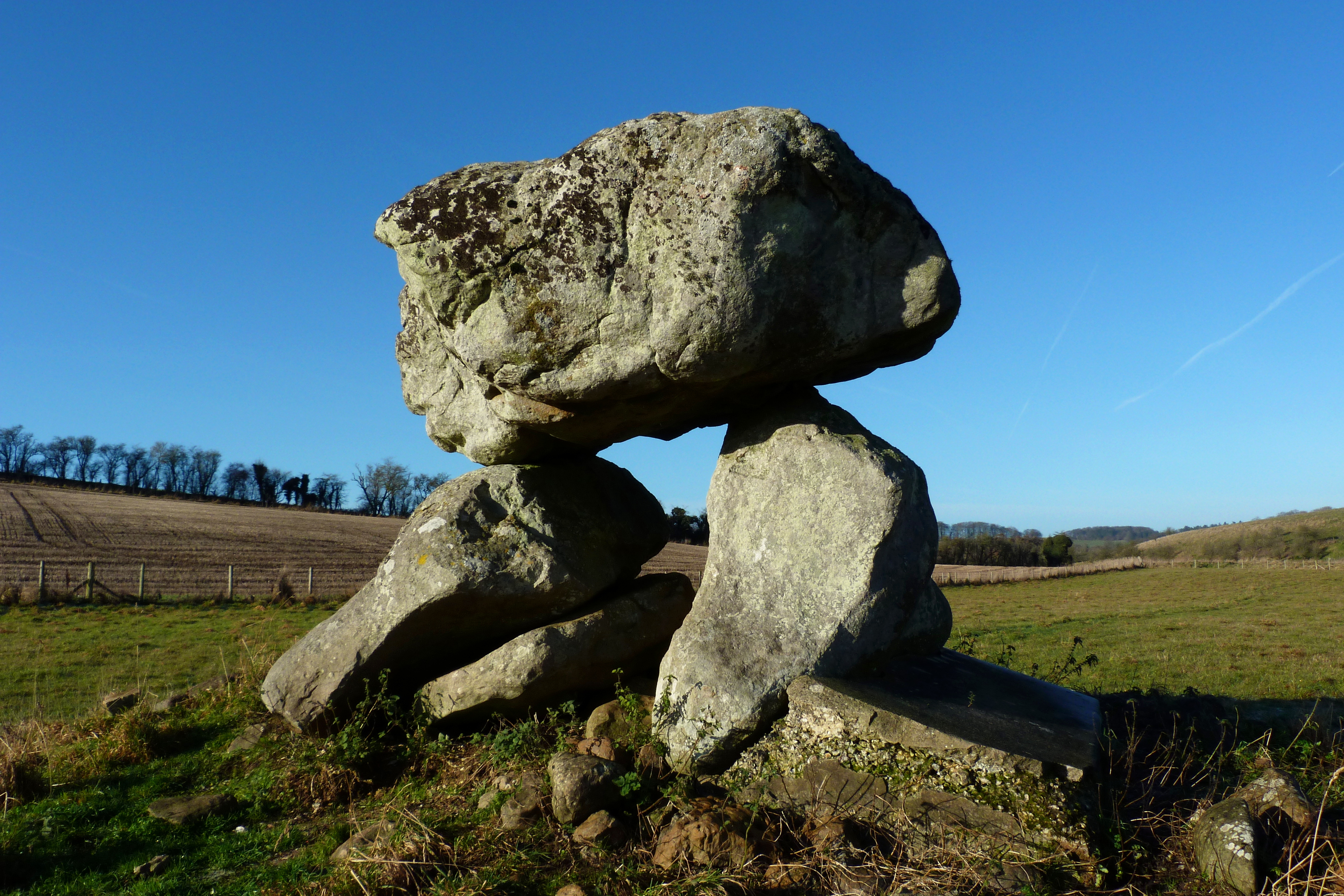

- The Devil's Den shown within Wiltshire
- 51.425678°N 1.782651°W
- Location: Fyfield, Wiltshire

Site notes
- Architectural style: British pre-Roman Architecture

The Devil's Den or Devil's Den is a dolmen burial chamber on Fyfield Hill near Marlborough, Wiltshire, England. The chamber is part of a Neolithic passage grave on Fyfield Down. Two standing stones, a capstone and two fallen stones are all that remain of what was the entrance to a long mound, described in the 1920s as being around 230 ft long (70 metres). The capstone is believed to weigh 17 tons. The burial chamber was reconstructed in 1921.

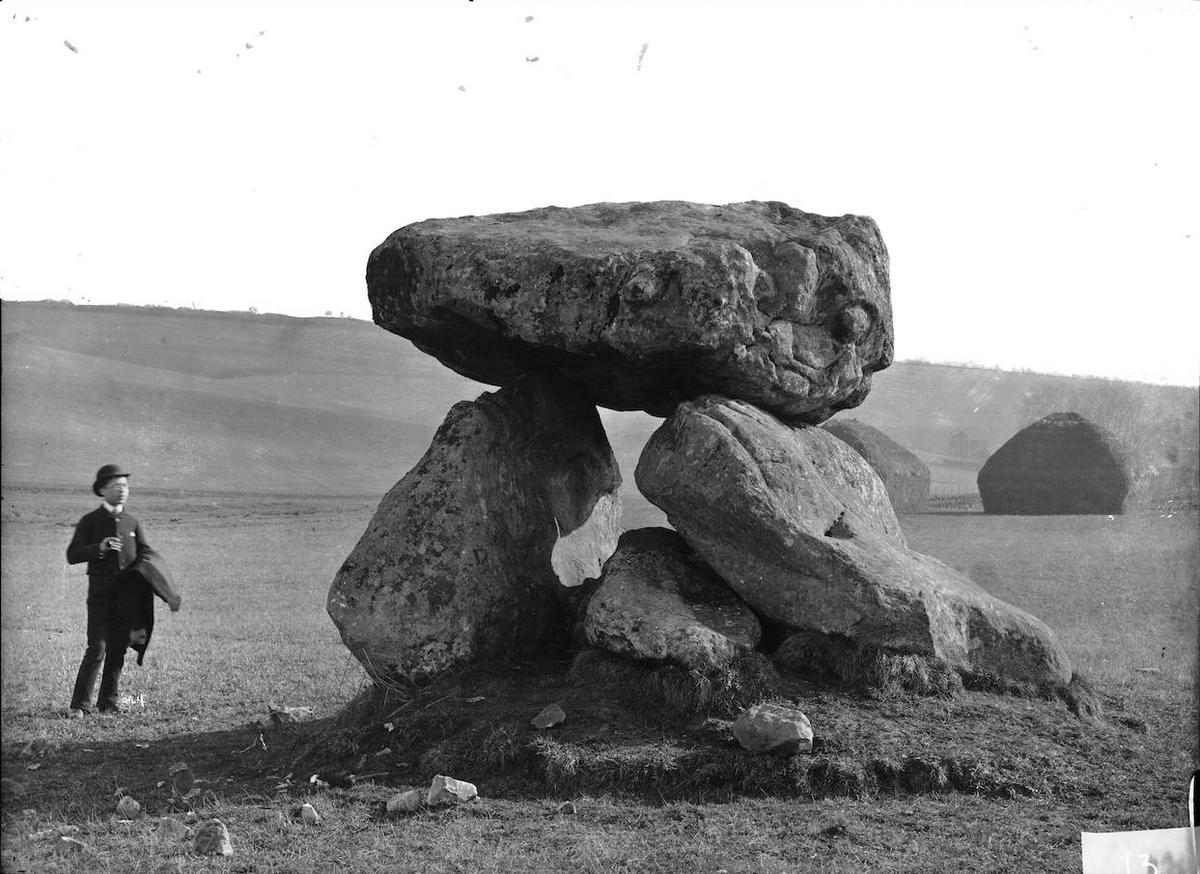
19th century image, photographer unknown, part of collection of glass plate negatives found in the cellar of the Wiltshire Gazette office in 1968.

The dolmen was named after the devil, along with many other prehistoric remains, after the coming of Christianity. A local tradition said that if water was poured into hollows on the capstone, a demon would come in the night and drink it.
