= Ibbs and Tillett =

British classical music artist and concert management agency

Ibbs and Tillett was a London-based classical music artist and concert management agency that flourished between 1906 and 1990 in the United Kingdom. It was described as "one of the legendary duos in classical music artist management".

== Founding ==
Ibbs and Tillett was founded by Robert Leigh Ibbs and John Tillett, who trained under impresario Nathaniel Vert (Narciso Vertigliano). It was Vert who, as Edward Elgar's concert manager, sent Elgar's Enigma Variations to another of his concert management clients, Vienna Philharmonic conductor Hans Richter, who premiered the work in London in 1899.

== Management ==
John Tillett's widow, Emmie Tillett, managed the agency after the deaths of the founders, and became one of the world's best-known managers; she was nicknamed the "Duchess of Wigmore Street" because Ibbs and Tillett's offices were at 124 Wigmore Street..

For the greater part of the twentieth century, Ibbs and Tillett's concert agency was to the British music industry what Marks and Spencer is to the world of the department store. The roll-call of famous musicians on its books was unmatched, and included such international stars as Clara Butt, Fritz Kreisler, Pablo Casals, Sergei Rachmaninov, Andrés Segovia, Kathleen Ferrier, Myra Hess, Jacqueline du Pré, Julian Lloyd Webber, Clifford Curzon and Vladimir Ashkenazy, to name but a handful ... the legacy and influence of Ibbs and Tillett has remained a benchmark in today's highly competitive world of artist management and concert promotion, many of whose principal operators began their working lives as 'Ibblets'.

— Christopher Fifield, Ibbs and Tillett: The Rise and Fall of a Musical Empire.

== See also ==
- Classical music of the United Kingdom
