= Effie Woodward Fifield =

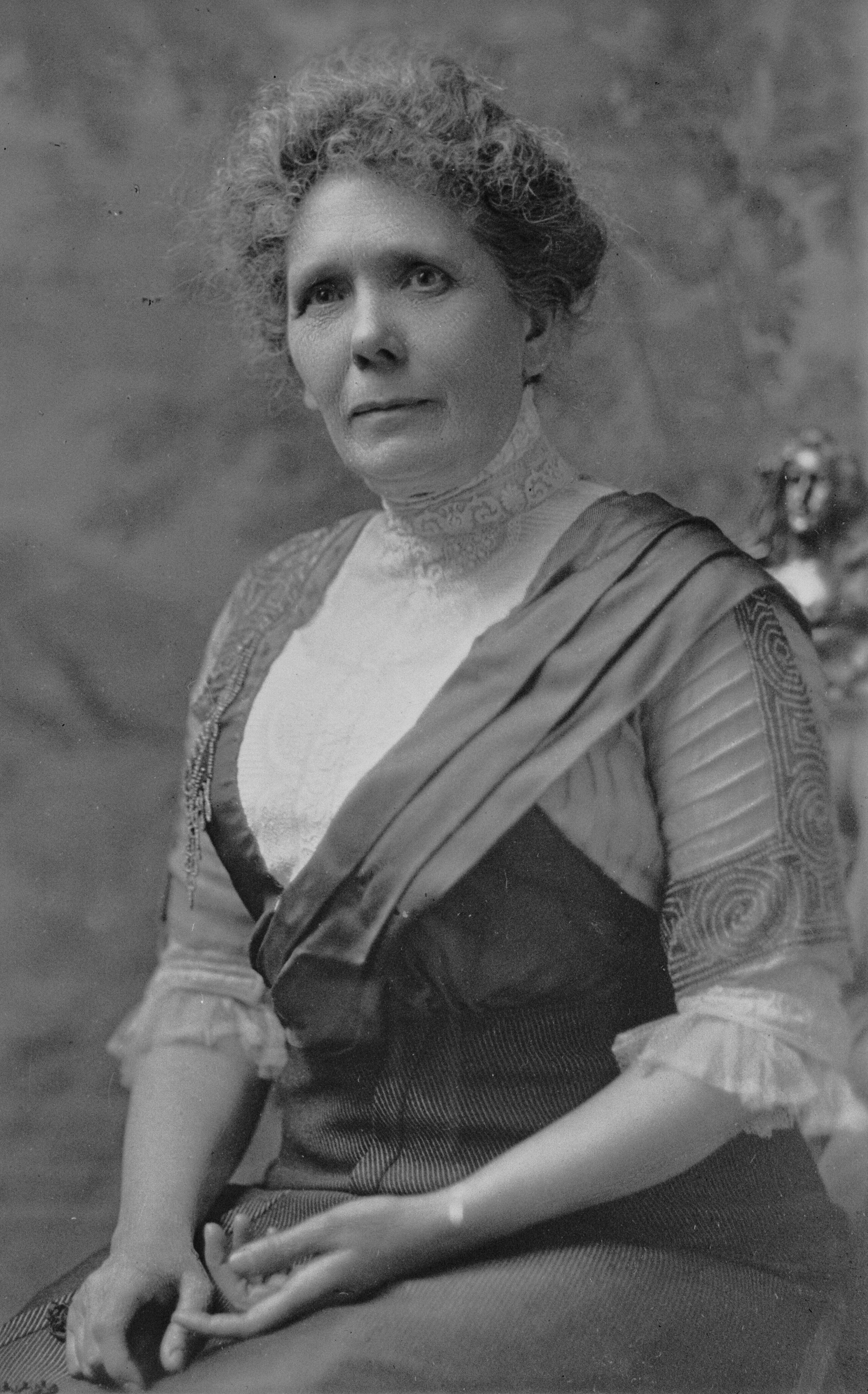
- Effie Woodward Fifield, 1935
- Born: Effie Woodward; February 17, 1857; Hyde Park Township, Wabasha County, Minnesota
- Died: November 21, 1937 (aged 80); La Crescenta, California
- Resting place: Lakewood Cemetery, Minneapolis, Minnesota
- Other names: Effie Woodward Merriman
- Occupations: Writer, editor, philanthropist

Effie Woodward Fifield (née Woodward; 17 February 1857 – 21 November 1937) was an American writer, editor, and philanthropist.

== Personal life ==
Effie Woodward was born on 17 February 1857 in Hyde Park, Wabasha County, Minnesota, the daughter of Charles E. and Marie (Sias) Woodward. She had some local schooling, but was largely self-educated.

She married her first husband, Frank T. Merriman, on 28 February 1879, and published much under her married name of Effie Woodward Merriman. The couple had one daughter, Beulah Merriman (1880 – 1883).

In 1906, Merriman married Joseph Clark Fifield, a Minnesotan publisher, in Glenwood Springs, Colorado.

She was an organizer for the Progressive Women of America, and its director for four years, as well as organizer of the Work and Play Club for young people.

Her entry in the Woman's Who's Who of America 1914-1915, listed her interests as in "helping the back-to-the-farm movement, the union of Protestant Churches, the spread of the so-called New Thought ideas, [and] the introduction of the Golden Rule into the servant girl problem". Her recreations were given as "Traveling, reading, writing".

== Writing ==
Effie Woodward Merriman began writing in 1880, and working as an editor from 1887. She was deputy editor of Spectator, a Minneapolis weekly journal, and subsequently edited The Housekeeper, also published out of Minneapolis, for fifteen years. The Housekeeper was a leading women's journal in the United States, and Merriman was described as bringing "little touches of sentiment and intimacy" which made her successful as editor.

Merriman published a number of serials and short stories, but particularly favored stories for children. One of her first, Pards, was "an illustrated story of two homeless boys" which followed them from "absolute destitution to comfort and respectability". Mollie Miller (1894) was described as "an inspiration to any boy and girl and a valuable aid to parents... full of incidents... bright, fresh, clean and wholesome".

== Death and legacy ==
Effie Woodward Fifield died on 21 November 1937 in La Crescenta, California. She willed her thirteen-room home, Twelve Oaks Lodge, to the International Sunshine Society, for the benefit of the elderly homeless.

== Bibliography ==
- Pards (1890)
- A Queer Family (1891)
- Socials (1891)
- The Little Millers (1891)
- Modern Entertainments (1898)
- How Women May Earn Money (1898)
- Sir Jefferson Nobody (1898)
- A Queer Dilemma and Other Stories (1898)
- The Emerson Club (1901)
- The Amazing Adventure of Joe Scranton (1923)
- Stony Cliff People (1930)
