= Oxford and Cambridge Musical Club =

British residential Club for Gentlemen

Coordinates: 51°31′10.6″N 0°7′45.11″W

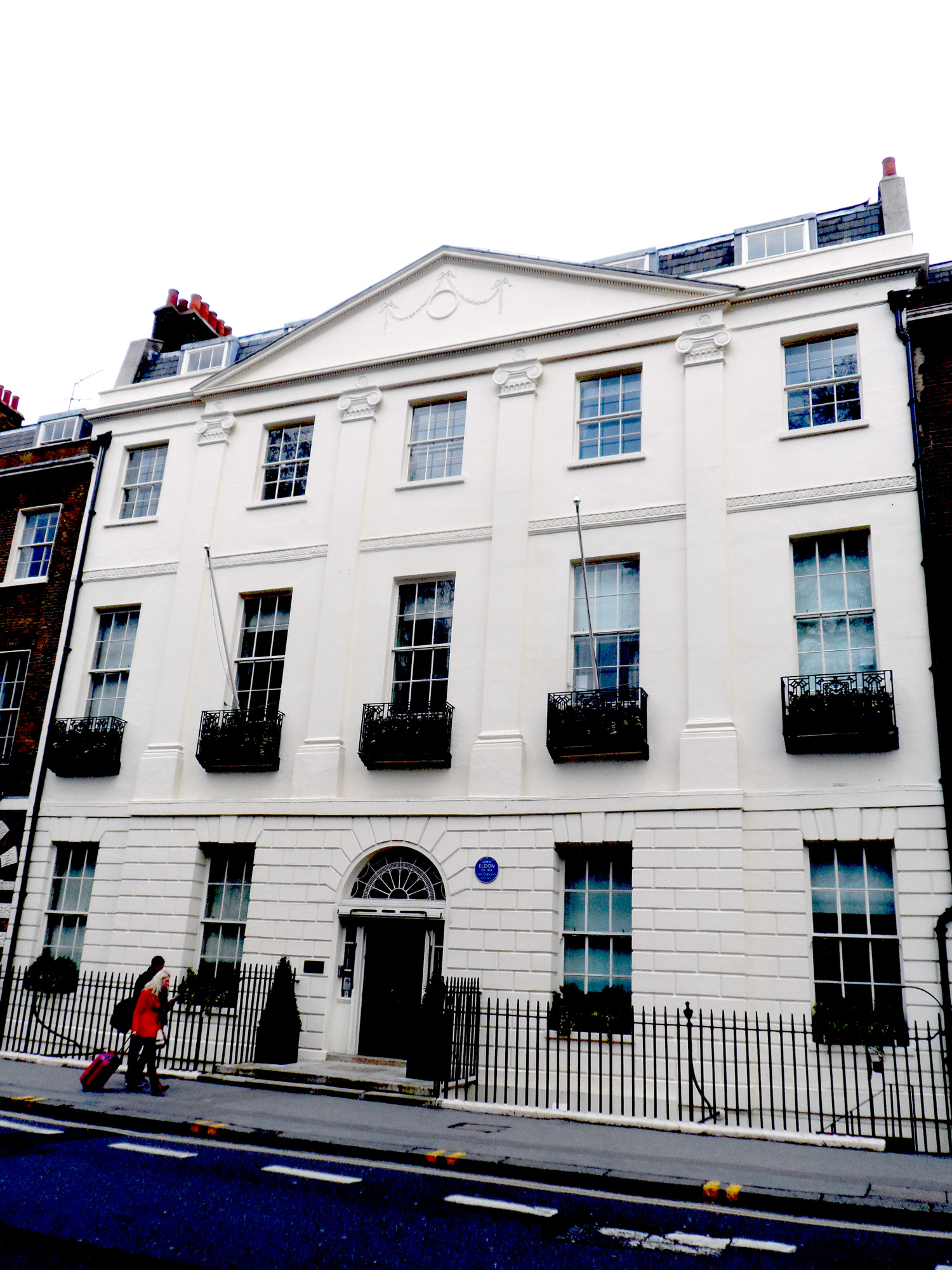
6 Bedford Square

The Oxford and Cambridge Musical Club is a London gentlemen's club for men and women who are involved in chamber, piano, orchestral, and operatic music. When founded in 1899, it was exclusive to members of the Universities of Oxford and Cambridge, but since the 20th century members who have not been members of either university have been accepted.

The club's original purpose was the performance of chamber music and solo piano and instrumental pieces. In later years the programmes expanded to include orchestral music, and from 1956, an annual opera. It has an association with the University College London Chamber Music Club.

Its first premises were at 47 Leicester Square but from 1914 to 1940 the club was situated at 6 Bedford Square. Ladies were first admitted in 1938. After 1940 the club ceased to be a residential club.

== Club history ==
The heyday of the club in its original form was from 1900 to 1940 when many famous musicians, politicians, and artists of the day were members. The first President of the Club was Dr. Joseph Joachim, the violinist and friend of the composer Brahms. At the establishment of the Club, a number of prominent people were invited to become honorary members, including the Prime Minister Arthur Balfour, who succeeded Joachim as Club President, composers Sir Hubert Parry and Sir Alexander Mackenzie and the conductor Hans Richter.

The Club Archives are held at the Bodleian Library Department of Special Collections in Oxford. An electronic archive of concert programmes from March 1922 onwards is maintained on the Club's website.

== Distinguished former members and honorary members ==
- Hugh Percy Allen
- Richard Armstrong
- Anthony Asquith
- Lennox Berkeley
- Adrian Boult
- John Dykes Bower
- Frederick Bridge
- Percy Buck
- George Butterworth
- Walter Willson Cobbett
- Walford Davies
- Désiré Defauw
- Thomas Dunhill
- Edward Elgar
- Gervase Elwes
- Frederic Alfred d'Erlanger
- Edmund Fellowes
- Christopher Fifield
- E. M. Forster
- Freddie Grisewood
- Patrick Hadley
- Ernest Markham Lee
- Compton Mackenzie
- Neville Marriner
- Ernest John Moeran
- Boris Ord
- Walter Parratt
- Harold Rutland
- Percy Scholes
- Geoffrey Shaw
- Heathcote Dicken Statham
- Lytton Strachey
- Lionel Tertis
- Donald Tovey
- Ralph Vaughan Williams
- William Walton
