= Hyde Park Township, Wabasha County, Minnesota =

Hyde Park Township, Minnesota
- Township
- Location within the state of Minnesota Hyde Park Township, Minnesota (the United States)
- Coordinates: 44°15′7″N 92°22′12″W
- Country: United States
- State: Minnesota
- County: Wabasha

Area
  - Total: 16.1 sq mi (41.6 km^{2})
  - Land: 15.9 sq mi (41.1 km^{2})
  - Water: 0.15 sq mi (0.4 km^{2})
- Elevation: 1,024 ft (312 m)

Population (2000)
  - Total: 275
  - Density: 17/sq mi (6.7/km^{2})
- Time zone: UTC-6 (Central (CST))
  - Summer (DST): UTC-5 (CDT)
- FIPS code: 27-30680
- GNIS feature ID: 0664538

Hyde Park Township is a township in Wabasha County, Minnesota, United States. The population was 275 at the 2000 census.

== History ==
Hyde Park Township was originally called Troy Township, and under the latter name was organized in 1858. It was later renamed Zumbro Township, until finally in 1862, the name of Hyde Park Township, after Hyde Park, London, was adopted.

== Geography ==
According to the United States Census Bureau, the township has a total area of 16.0 square miles (41 km^{2}); 15.9 square miles (41 km^{2}) of it is land and 0.2 square miles (0.52 km^{2}) of it (1.06%) is water.

== Demographics ==
As of the census of 2000, there were 275 people, 104 households, and 69 families residing in the township. The population density was 17.3 inhabitants per square mile (6.7/km^{2}). There were 111 housing units at an average density of 7.0 per square mile (2.7/km^{2}). The racial makeup of the township was 99.64% White, 0.36% from other races. Hispanic or Latino of any race were 0.36% of the population.

There were 104 households, out of which 36.5% had children under the age of 18 living with them, 58.7% were married couples living together, 4.8% had a female householder with no husband present, and 32.7% were non-families. 23.1% of all households were made up of individuals, and 11.5% had someone living alone who was 65 years of age or older. The average household size was 2.64 and the average family size was 3.23.

In the township the population was spread out, with 25.5% under the age of 18, 11.6% from 18 to 24, 27.3% from 25 to 44, 24.4% from 45 to 64, and 11.3% who were 65 years of age or older. The median age was 36 years. For every 100 females, there were 106.8 males. For every 100 females age 18 and over, there were 111.3 males.

The median income for a household in the township was $56,667, and the median income for a family was $61,250. Males had a median income of $40,417 versus $22,411 for females. The per capita income for the township was $28,488. None of the families and 2.3% of the population were living below the poverty line, including no under eighteens and 5.6% of those over 64.
