= Fyfield Down =

Protected area on the Marlborough Downs in Wiltshire, England

- Downland
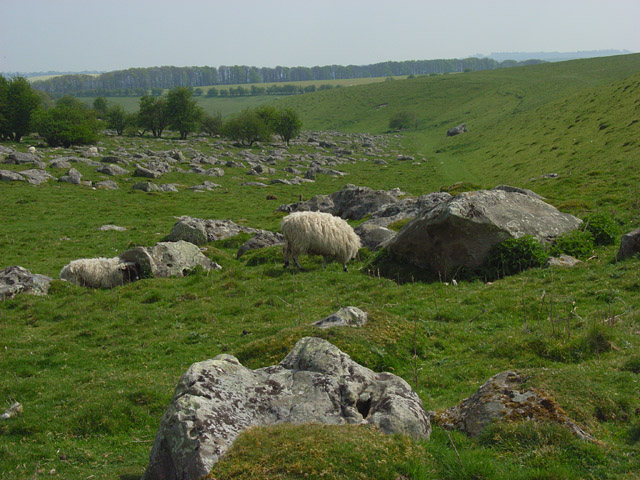
- Sarsen stones on Fyfield Down

- Location in Wiltshire
- Coordinates: 51.4369°N 1.8057°W
- Grid position: SU136709
- Location: Wiltshire, England, UK

Fyfield Down (grid reference SU136709) is part of the Marlborough Downs, about 1.5 miles (2.4 km) north of the village of Fyfield, Wiltshire. The down is a 325.3 hectare biological and geological Site of Special Scientific Interest, notified in 1951. The down has the best assemblage of sarsen stones in England, known as the Grey Wethers.

The site is to be distinguished from another Fyfield Down also in Wiltshire, east of Pewsey and on the edge of Salisbury Plain, near another place called Fyfield. The two places are only about 9 miles (14 km) apart.

== Sarsens ==
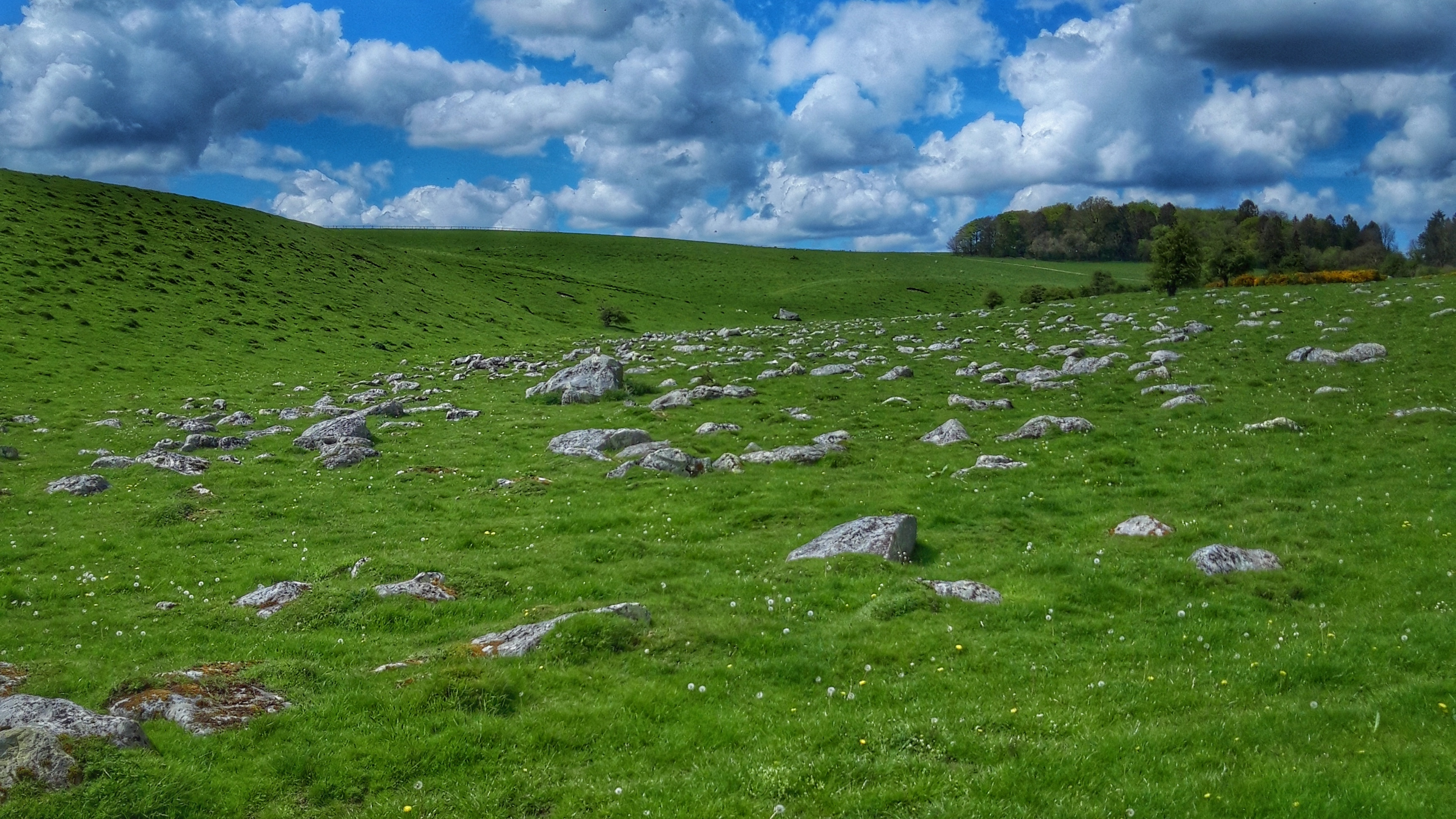
Sarsen stones on Fyfield Down

The down has the best assemblage of sarsen stones in England. The stones are known here as the Grey Wethers for their likeness to sheep when seen from a distance. They were noted by Col. Richard Symonds in his diary for 1644: "They call that place the Grey-wethers, because a far off they looke like a flock of sheepe." They support a nationally important lichen flora. An alternative name for this natural rock feature is Mother's Jam.

=== The Polisher ===
On the west side of the down (grid reference SU12837150) is a recumbent sarsen stone with grooved markings. It is thought to be a prehistoric grinding bench for shaping, whetting, and polishing stone axe-heads, and is similar to other Neolithic and Bronze Age examples in France. The Polisher is also referred to as The Polissoir stone, or the Fyfield polissoir.

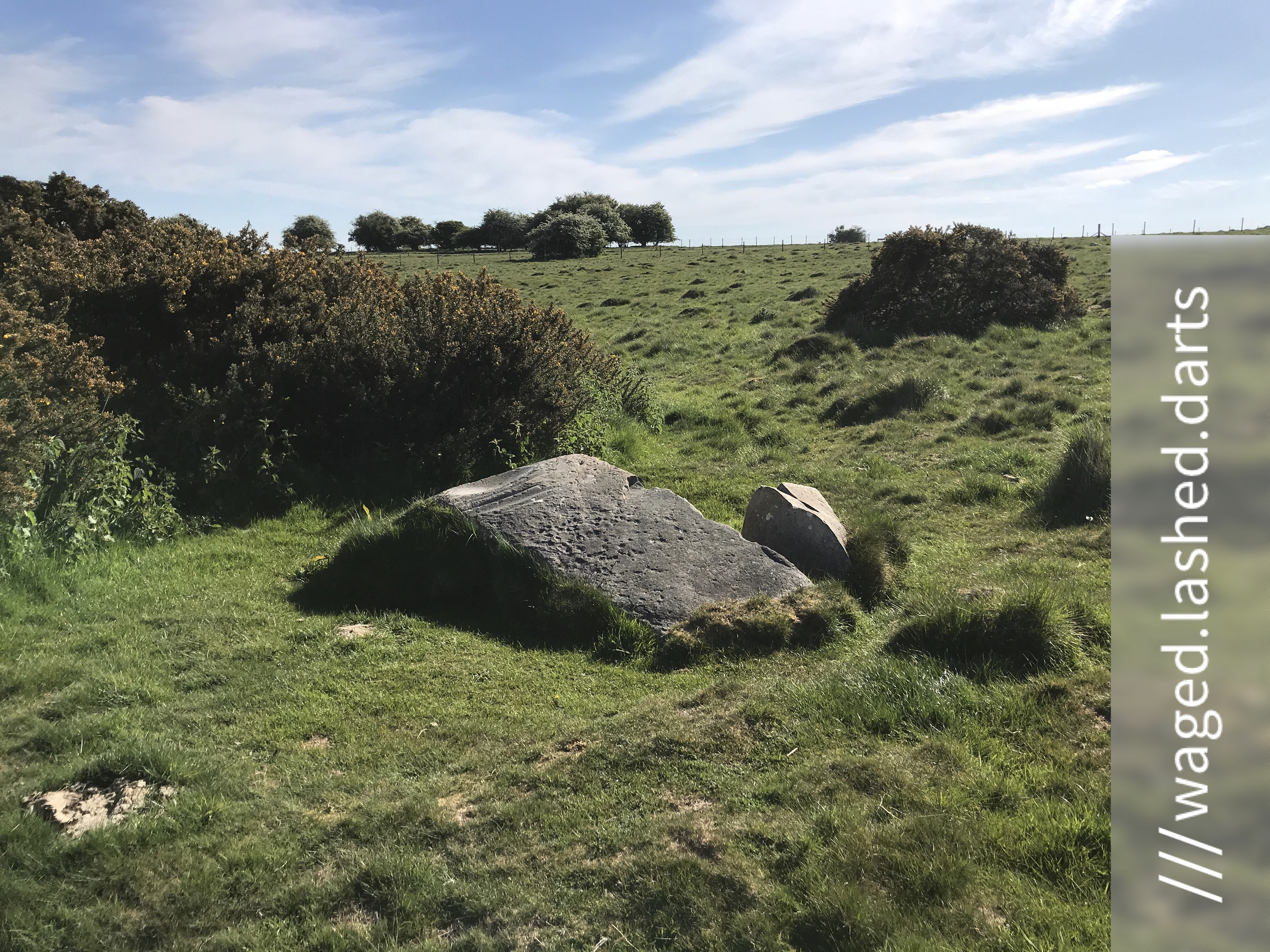
The Polisher

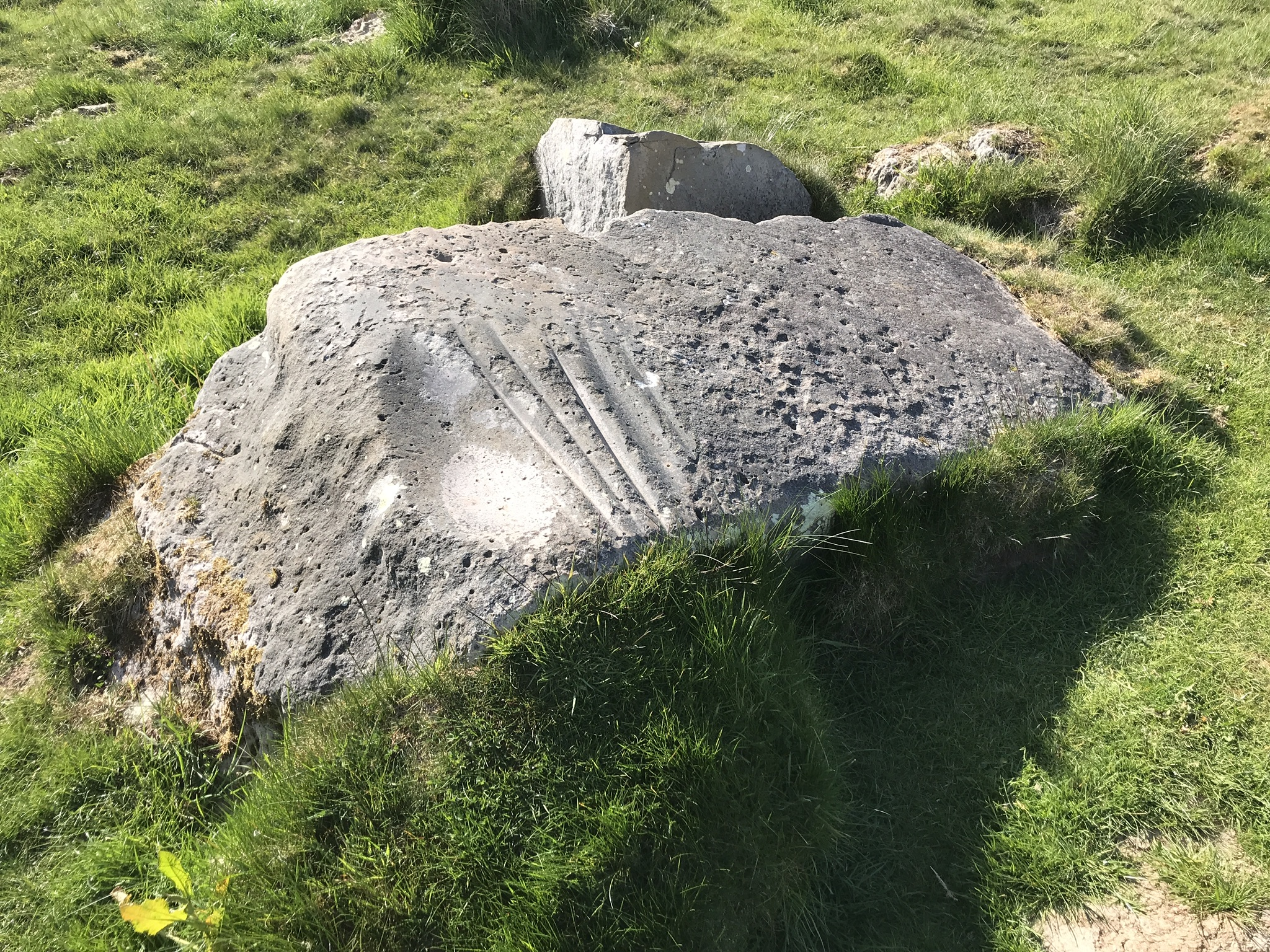
The Polisher close up

== Dolmen ==
To the east is a prehistoric dolmen known as The Devil's Den (grid reference SU151697). It is the remains of a Neolithic passage grave which was reconstructed in 1921.

== Sources ==
- Natural England citation sheet for the site (accessed 31 March 2022)
