= Lambeth Orchestra =

The Lambeth Orchestra is an amateur orchestra founded in 1972. It gives a regular series of 6 concerts each year at All Saints Church, West Dulwich and St John's Waterloo.

The Orchestra's conductor for the last 30 seasons has been Christopher Fifield.

The orchestra's repertoire reflects both mainstream established classics, together with world premieres of newly commissioned pieces, and the revival of neglected repertoire, especially of British composers. Examples include the first ever performance of Gustav Holst's Walt Whitman Overture in July 1982, the first modern performance of Arthur Hinton's Symphony No 1 and Piano Concerto in D, and the first modern performances of Frederic Cliffe's Symphony No 1 (first performance in 80 years, December 2007), Violin Concerto (first performance in 111 years, May 2007), and his Coronation March and Symphony No 2.
