= Russell Hunt Fifield =

American political scientist (1914–2003)

Russell Hunt Fifield

Russell Hunt Fifield (21 February 1914 – 2 June 2003) was an American political scientist, writer, and professor of political science at the University of Michigan. He was a specialist in the politics of American involvement in Southeast Asia.

== Notable works ==
- Geopolitics in Principle and Practice. Ginn & Co., Boston, New York, 1944. (With George Etzel Pearcy)
- The Hukbalahap Today. Institute of Pacific Relations, Honolulu, Hawaii, 1951.
- The Diplomacy of Southeast Asia, 1945-1958. Harper, New York, 1958.
- Southeast Asia in United States Policy. Praeger, New York, 1963.
- Woodrow Wilson and the Far East: The Diplomacy of the Shantung Question. 1965.
- Americans in Southeast Asia: The Roots of Commitment. Crowell, New York, 1973.
- The Liquidation of a War: The United States and Vietnam. Centre d'Etude du Sud-Est Asiatique et de l'Extreme-Orient, Bruxelles, 1978.
- National and Regional Interests in ASEAN: Competition and Co-operation in International Politics. Institute of Southeast Asian Studies, Singapore, 1979.
