= George Fifield (boxer) =

Canadian boxer

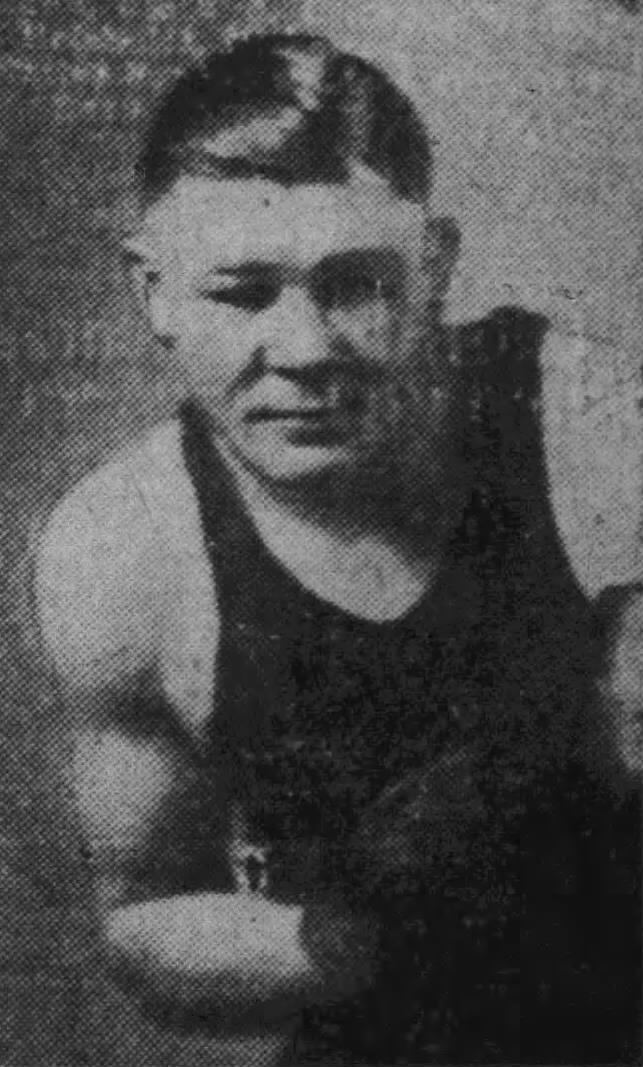

Personal information
- Nationality: (Canada) Canadian
- Born: George Fifield; 1904 Gloucester, Gloucestershire, United Kingdom
- Died: May 13, 1962 (aged 57–58) Toronto, Ontario, Canada
- Occupation: Boxer
- Height: 5 ft 8 in (173cm)
- Weight: Featherweight; Welterweight

Boxing career

Boxing record
- Total fights: 71
- Wins: 42
- Win by KO: 16
- Losses: 25
- Draws: 4

George Fifield (1904 – May 13, 1962) was an English-born Canadian professional welterweight boxer. He was the 1922 AAU National Featherweight Champion who held the Canadian welterweight boxing championship from 1925 to 1928.

== Early life ==
George Fifield was born in Gloucester, Gloucestershire, United Kingdom, around 1904.

== Amateur boxing career ==
Fifield trained and fought out of the Riverside Athletic Club under Frank Gallagher in Toronto. In February 1922, he fought in two amateur boxing bouts during the 1922 International Amateur Boxing Championships held at New York's Madison Square Garden. Fifield claimed the featherweight title with a victory over Danny Gartin of Philadelphia in the final.

Fifield competed for the 125-pound title at the National AAU Championship on April 18, 1922, in Boston, becoming the United States national amateur boxing featherweight champion before competing days later in the amateur boxing championships of Ontario.

== Professional career ==
The amateur boxing champion debuted as a professional boxer in December 1922. He trained for his first bout with featherweight Benny Gould. Fifield's professional debut was featured as a main event at Toronto's Gayety Theatre, earning a points victory over rival Ray Chisholm, the featherweight champion of the Maritime Provinces. The bout was promoted as the junior lightweight championship of Canada. Fifield entered the bout at 134 pounds, while Chisholm weighed in at 126¾ pounds.

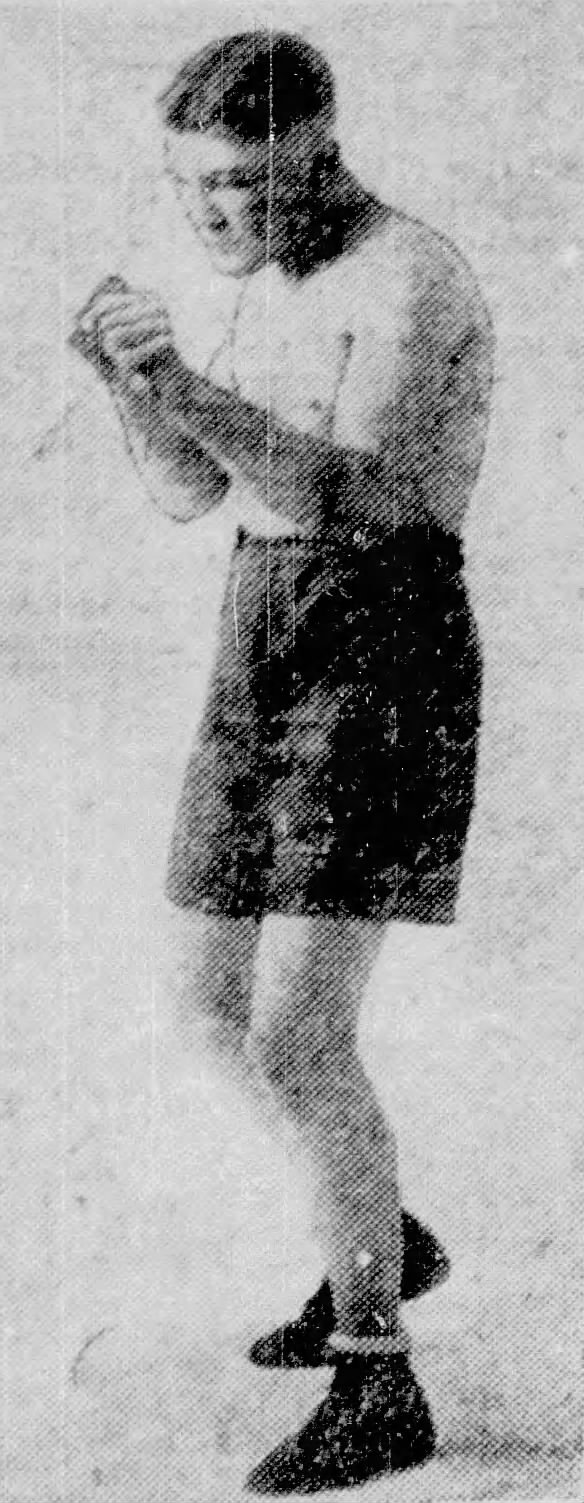
George Fifield, c. 1922

He boxed in his first matchup with Bert Schneider, 1920 Olympic boxing gold medalist, on April 20, 1925. The bout appeared on the inaugural professional boxing card at the historic Montreal Forum, which had opened five months before.

=== Taking the Canadian welterweight championship, October 1925 ===
Fifield won the Canadian welterweight championship on October 2, 1925, outpointing Bert Schneider in a ten-round title fight officiated by Lou Marsh in Toronto.

He defended his title for the first time two months after winning it, outpointing Frankie Bull over ten rounds at Toronto's Standard Theatre.

Fifield went on to secure four successful title defenses in total, holding the belt for three years. In Montreal on October 22, 1928, the Canadian champion was disqualified for a seventh-round foul in his championship defense against George Sidders. Fifield was reported to have landed a rabbit punch behind Sidders' neck, dropping him and forcing the stoppage. The bout generated a record turnout of 15,000 at the Montreal Forum. The card made Canadian boxing history as the first to produce two new champions in a single night.

His last professional bout came in July 1930 against Joe Trippe at Dunn Field.

== Professional boxing record ==
| 71 fights | 42 wins | 25 losses |
|---|---|---|
| By knockout | 16 | 8 |
| By decision | 26 | 17 |
| Draws | 4 | |

== Personal life ==
Fifield's sons were Billy Fifield, a professional boxer who challenged for multiple Canadian titles at middleweight and light heavyweight, and Hugh Fifield, a member of the Royal Canadian Air Force based at Barrington, Nova Scotia.

== Death ==
George Fifield died in Toronto, Ontario, Canada, on May 13, 1962, at 58 years old.

Achievements
| Preceded by Vacant | Canadian Welterweight Champion; October 2, 1925 – October 22, 1928 | Succeeded by George Sidders |
