= Christopher Fifield =

English conductor and music historian (1945–2025)

Christopher Fifield (4 September 1945 – 19 January 2025) was an English conductor, classical music historian and musicologist based in London.

== Life and career ==
From 1982 until 2022 music director of the Lambeth Orchestra, Fifield is known for his exploration of neglected compositions, often from the 19th century Romantic repertoire. He is also known to the classical music listening public for his concert intermission talks from The Proms and other broadcasts for BBC Radio 3, the BBC World Service, and Classic FM.

He recorded for the Swedish label Sterling world premiere cds of late-19th century orchestral music (Frederic Cliffe, Xaver and Philipp Scharwenka, Andreas Hallen, Robert Hermann, Franz Xaver Schnyder von Wartensee and Richard Franck).

He was the biographer of Max Bruch and Hans Richter, edited the Letters and Diaries of Kathleen Ferrier and wrote a meticulously researched history of Ibbs and Tillett, the artists and management agency.

A native of Croydon, Christopher Fifield studied at the University of Manchester and at the Musikhochschule in Cologne. He began his conducting career as deputy music director at the opera house in Cape Town. He served on the music staff at Glyndebourne for twelve years, as director of music at University College London for ten years and as chorus master to Chelsea Opera Group. For two years he was music director of the London Contemporary Dance Theatre,

Fifield frequently conducted for the Oxford and Cambridge Musical Club. He has conducted the Jubilate Choir Northampton Symphony Orchestra and Central Festival Opera as well as other orchestras in the United Kingdom and in other countries.

Christopher Fifield wrote the 'Conducting Wagner' section of Wagner in Performance, published in 1992 by the Yale University Press. He is a contributor to the current edition of The Oxford Companion to Music a reviewer for MusicWeb International, and participates in academic conferences. In 2011 he was awarded a PhD from University of Bristol; his thesis was 'The German symphony between Beethoven and Brahms: the fall and rise of a genre'.

Fifield died from complications of dementia on 19 January 2025, at the age of 79.

== Books ==
- 1988: repr. 2005 in paperback Max Bruch biography. Max Bruch: His Life and Works. New York City: George Braziller. ISBN 0-8076-1204-9.
- 1993: Hans Richter biography. Foreword by Georg Solti. True Artist and True Friend: A Biography of Hans Richter. Oxford University Press. ISBN 0-19-816157-3.
- 2003: repr. 2011 in an enlarged and revised paperback edition Kathleen Ferrier biography. Letters and Diaries of Kathleen Ferrier. Woodbridge: Boydell. ISBN 1-84383-012-4.
- 2005: Ibbs and Tillett history. Ibbs and Tillett: The Rise and Fall of a Musical Empire. Aldershot and London: Ashgate Publishing, formerly Scolar Press. ISBN 1-84014-290-1.
- 2015: The German Symphony between Beethoven and Brahms: The Fall and Rise of a Genre. Aldershot and London: Ashgate Publishing ISBN 978-1-4094-5288-1.
