= Fyfield (near Marlborough) =

Village in Wiltshire, England

Coordinates: 51.417°N 1.789°W

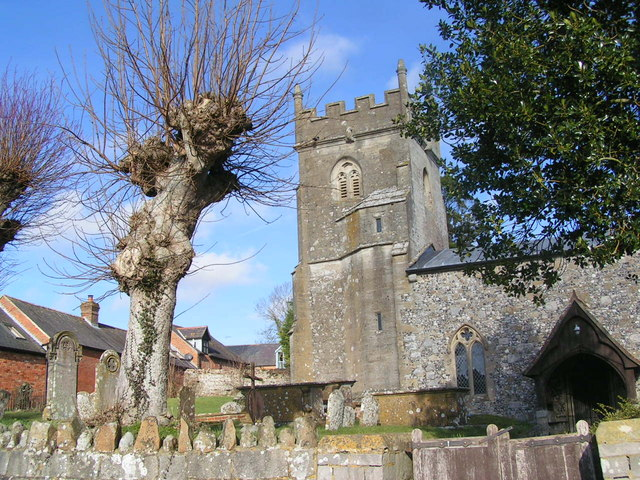
- St Nicholas' Church, Fyfield

- Location within Wiltshire
- Population: 195 (in 2011)
- OS grid reference: SU148687
- Civil parish: Fyfield
- Unitary authority: Wiltshire
- Ceremonial county: Wiltshire
- Region: South West
- Country: England
- Sovereign state: United Kingdom
- Post town: Marlborough
- Postcode district: SN8
- Dialling code: 01264
- Police: Wiltshire
- Fire: Dorset and Wiltshire
- Ambulance: South Western
- UK Parliament: East Wiltshire
- Website: Parish Council

Fyfield is a village and civil parish in the English county of Wiltshire, in the Kennet Valley about 2.5 miles (4.0 km) west of Marlborough. The village is on the A4 road which was historically the main route from London to the west of England. In 2011 the parish had a population of 195.

== History ==
Fyfield Down has extensive remains from successive phases of prehistoric to post-medieval activity. A 300-acre field system extending onto Overton Down has produced Iron Age and Romano-British finds.

The downland has many sarsen stones – pieces of dense, hard, sandy rock. In prehistoric times these were used for monuments, handaxes, quern-stones and other implements; medieval houses in Kennet Valley villages had walls made from sarsen blocks. Around 1850, Edward Free began a stone-cutting business at Fyfield which supplied much material for buildings, pavements and kerbs. The Free family moved to Marlborough in 1890; sarsen cutting declined after 1915 and ceased in 1939.

Prior to the mid 19th century, the village was centred south of the church, in the valley northeast of Lockeridge House (c. 1740). After a fire, this area was abandoned in favour of higher ground along the Bath Road; many of the new cottages were demolished during road improvements in the 1930s, leaving the village without a heart.

From c. 1880, about 560 acres on Fyfield Down and Overton Down, overlapping much of the present nature reserve and then owned by the Meux family, was managed as a rabbit warren for sport shooting. Most of the land was sold in 1906 by the widow of Sir Henry Bruce Meux to racehorse trainer Alec Taylor; in 1910 Taylor closed the warren and had some 14,000 rabbits killed, in order to use the area for exercising horses.

== Governance ==
Fyfield elects a joint parish council with the adjacent parish of West Overton, named Kennet Valley Parish Council (the name Fyfield and West Overton was used until 2022). The parish falls within the area of the Wiltshire Council unitary authority, which is responsible for most local government functions.

Before the 19th century, Fyfield was a chapelry of Overton parish, alongside the tithings of East Overton, Lockeridge, Shaw, and West Overton. The tithings became a poor law parish called West Overton, while Fyfield relieved its own poor; this probably led the Census enumerators of 1841 to class Fyfield, with its medieval chapel, incorrectly as an ancient parish, which in turn led to its establishment as a civil parish.

Clatford Park and Overton Heath, to the south of the ancient Wansdyke and in the far south of the modern parish, were extra-parochial areas in the earlier 19th century. In 1896 they were merged into Fyfield parish.

== Landmarks ==
North of the A4, the parish extends onto the Marlborough Downs. Here Fyfield Down is a biological and geological Site of Special Scientific Interest, noted for its sarsen stones and prehistoric sites including The Devil's Den, the remains of a Neolithic burial chamber.

Parts of the south of the parish lie within the West Woods, which has been managed since 1931 by the Forestry Commission.

== Church ==
The Church of England parish church of St Nicholas is Grade II* listed. The building has 13th-century origins and a 15th-century tower; it was restored in 1849. Today the church is part of the Upper Kennet benefice.

== Inns ==
Fyfield's earliest known inn was The Crown and Fighting Cocks. Mark Pope Snr was the innholder at the time of drafting his last will and testament in 1776. According to his will he left the inn to his wife, Anne Pope, for the term of her life or until the day she remarried. Mark died in June 1780 and his will was proved at Marlborough on 24 July 1780. In his will Mark referred to his "ancient dwelling house or Inn known by the sign of The Crown and Fighting Cocks situated and being in Fyfield". This suggests the inn had been in business for an extended period.

Sometime during the 14 years Mark Pope's widow, Anne, was innholder, the name changed to The Fighting Cocks. Anne died in 1794 and in her will she bequeathed The Fighting Cocks inn to her son, Luke Pope. It is not known how long Luke operated the inn.

The Fighting Cocks’ known innholders were:

- Mark Pope – from at least 1776 until 1780
- Anne Pope – from 1780 to 1794
- Luke Pope – from 1794 to ?
- Thomas Maslen – from at least 1849 to at least 1855
- Mrs Sarah Free – 1859
- Mr Free – reported in 1860 (start and finish date unknown)
- George Scott – 1875
- Thomas Smith – 1880
- An unnamed landlady – 1884 (start and finish date unknown)
- W.W.Jackman – 1889
- Thomas Maslen – 1894 (start and finish date unknown)
- Mr Caswell, blacksmith – 1906 (approx.) (start and finish date unknown)
- Mr E. Pile – 1936 (approx.) (start and finish date unknown)

The Fighting Cocks was demolished in the 1930s to allow for road widening.
