= 1958 NSWRFL season =

Rugby league competition

1958 New South Wales Rugby Football League
- Teams: 10
- Premiers: St. George (5th title)
- Minor premiers: St. George (5th title)
- Matches played: 95
- Points scored: 3050
- Attendance: 1030272
- Top points scorer(s): Harry Bath (225)
- Wooden spoon: Parramatta (6th spoon)
- Top try-scorer(s): Eddie Lumsden (18)

The 1958 NSWRFL season was the 51st season of the New South Wales Rugby Football League, Australia's first rugby league football competition. Ten teams from across Sydney competed for the J. J. Giltinan Shield during the season, which culminated in a grand final between St. George and Western Suburbs.

== Season summary ==
Having been wooden spooners in 1955, Wests embarked on a massive spending spree to recruit internationals Harry Wells, Kel O'Shea, Arthur Summons, Dick Poole, Darcy Henry and Ian Moir over a five-year period. The fruits of this labour began to show in 1958 when they finished in second place for the minor premiership and posed a challenge to St. George in the finals.

Harry Bath was the competition's leading goal scorer in 1958, with his St George teammate Eddie Lumsden the leading try scorer. Bath shattered the Dragons club's point scoring record with 225 season points from three tries and 108 goals.

Nineteen-year-old Reg Gasnier, later to be honoured as one of the Australian game's Immortals, made his Third Grade debut in 1958 and was immediately noticed, regularly scoring length-of-the-field tries.

The 1958 season also saw the retirement from the League of future Australian Rugby League Hall of Fame inductee, Clive Churchill.

=== Teams ===
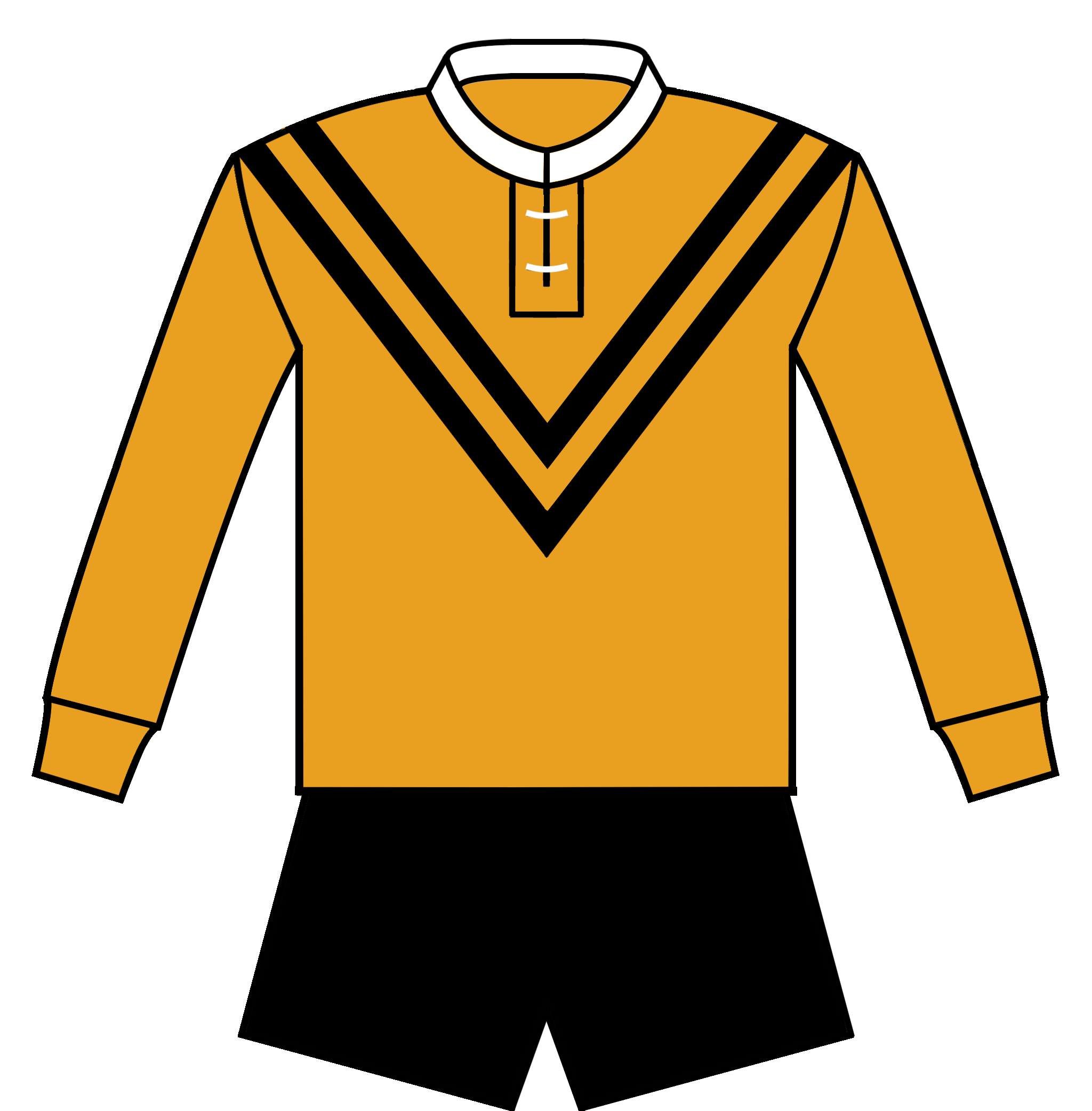
Balmain 51st season Ground: Leichhardt Oval; Coach: John O'Toole; Captain: Bill Marsh

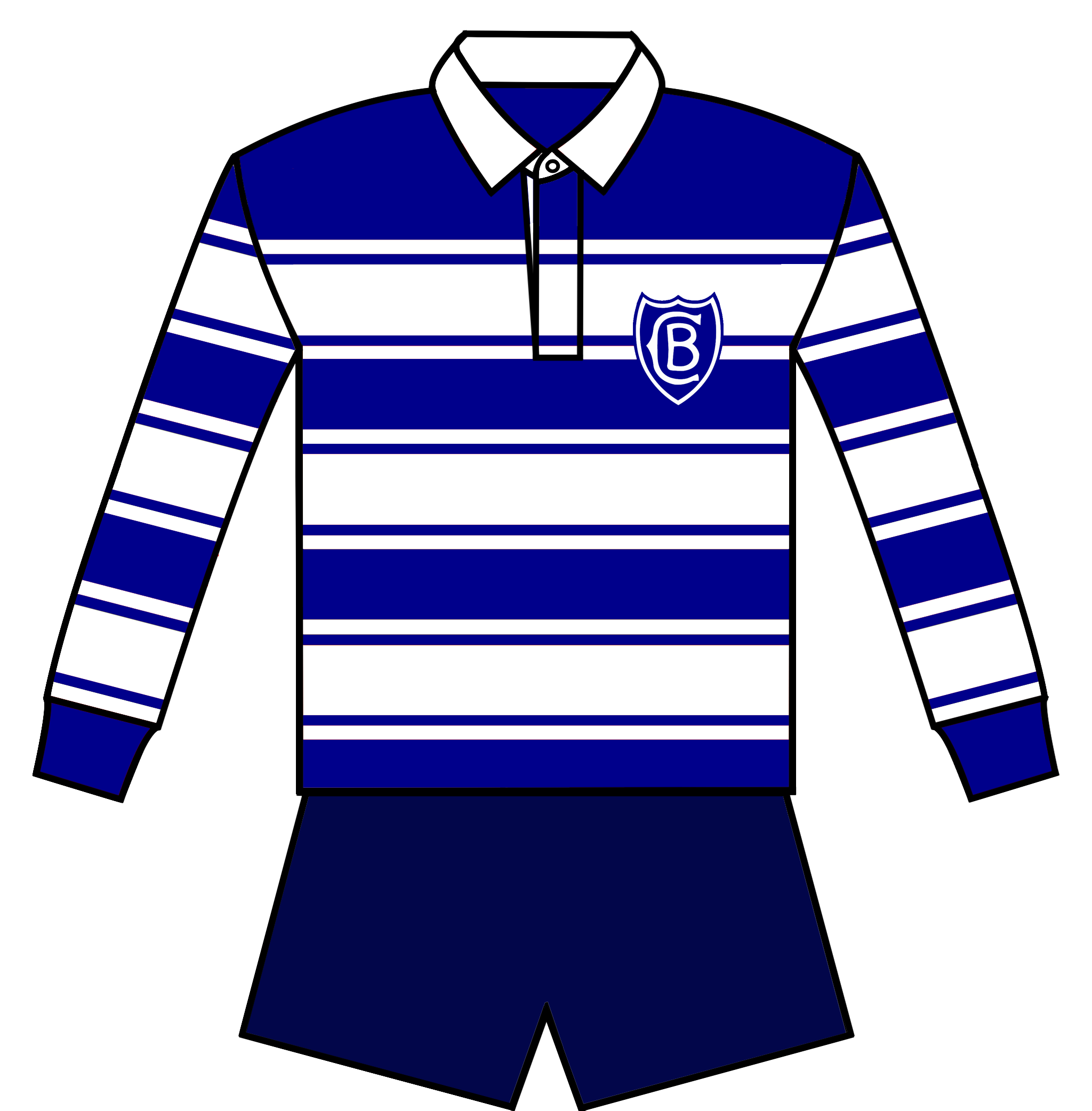
Canterbury-Bankstown 24th season Ground: Belmore Sports Ground; Coach: Cec Cooper; Captain: Ray Gartner

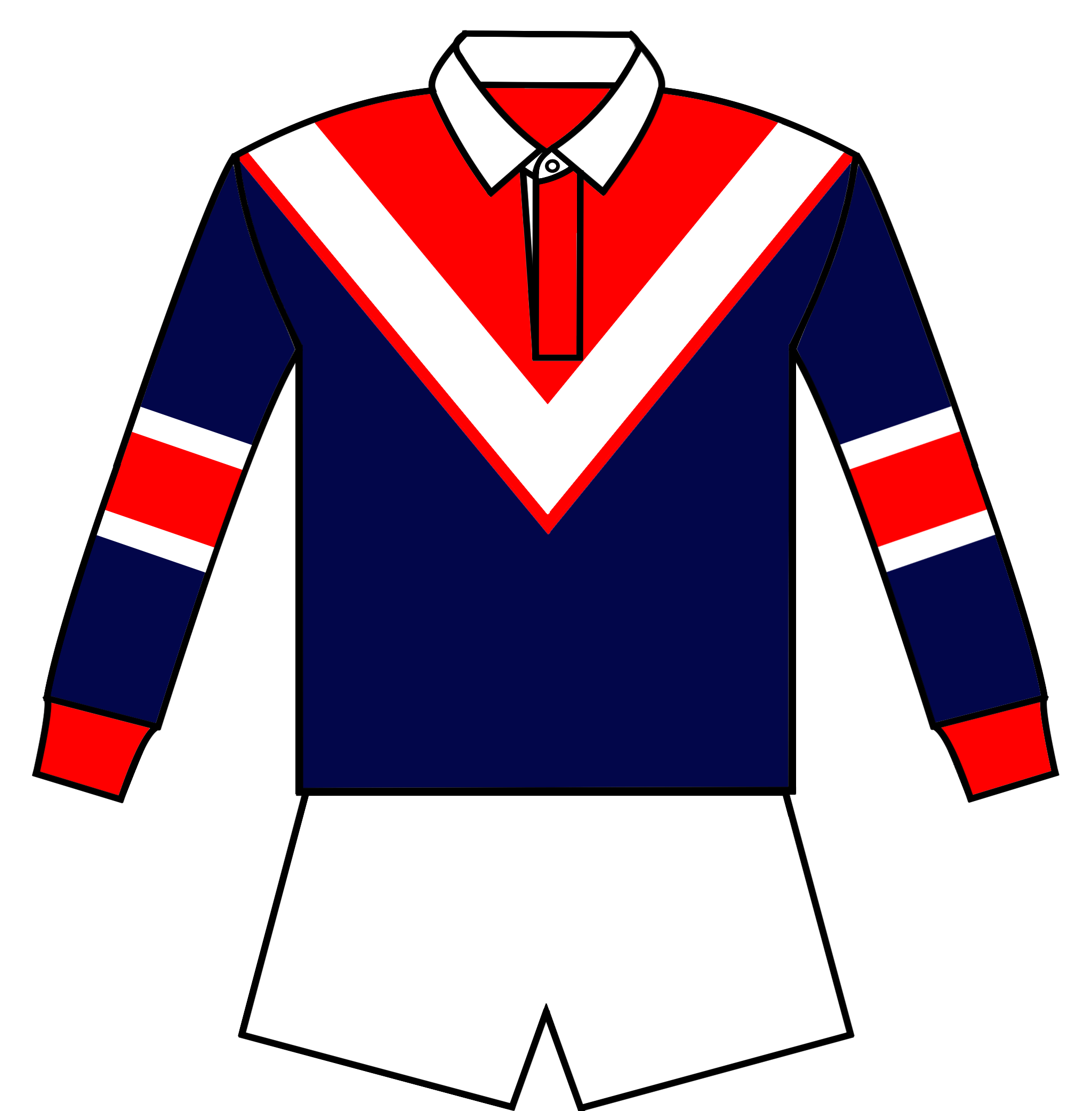
Eastern Suburbs 51st season Ground: Sydney Sports Ground; Coach: Dave Brown; Captain: Terry Fearnley

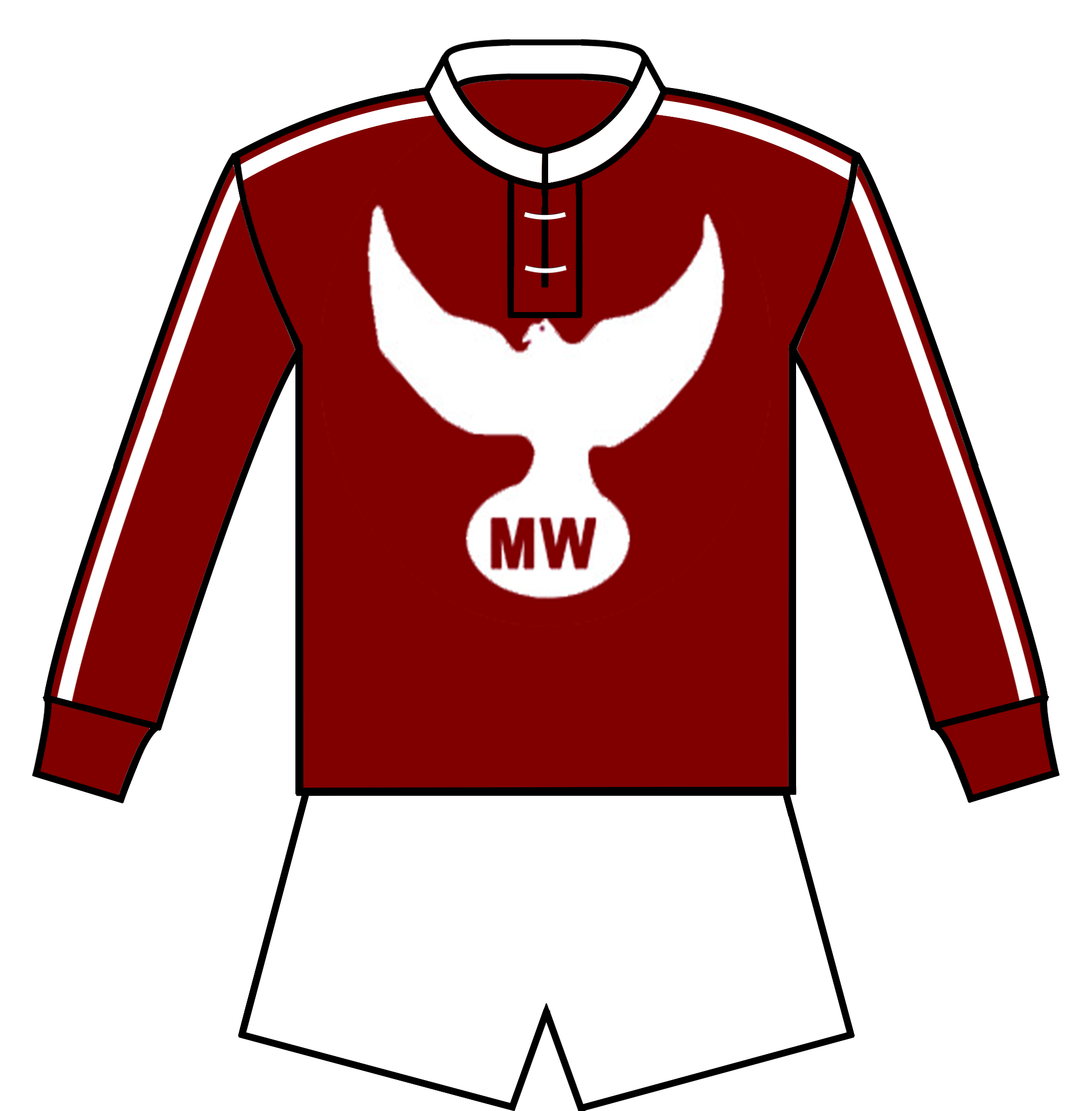
Manly-Warringah 12th season Ground: Brookvale Oval; Coach: Ken Arthurson; Captain: Ron Willey

Newtown 51st season Ground: Henson Park; Coach: Dick Poole; Captain: Gordon Clifford

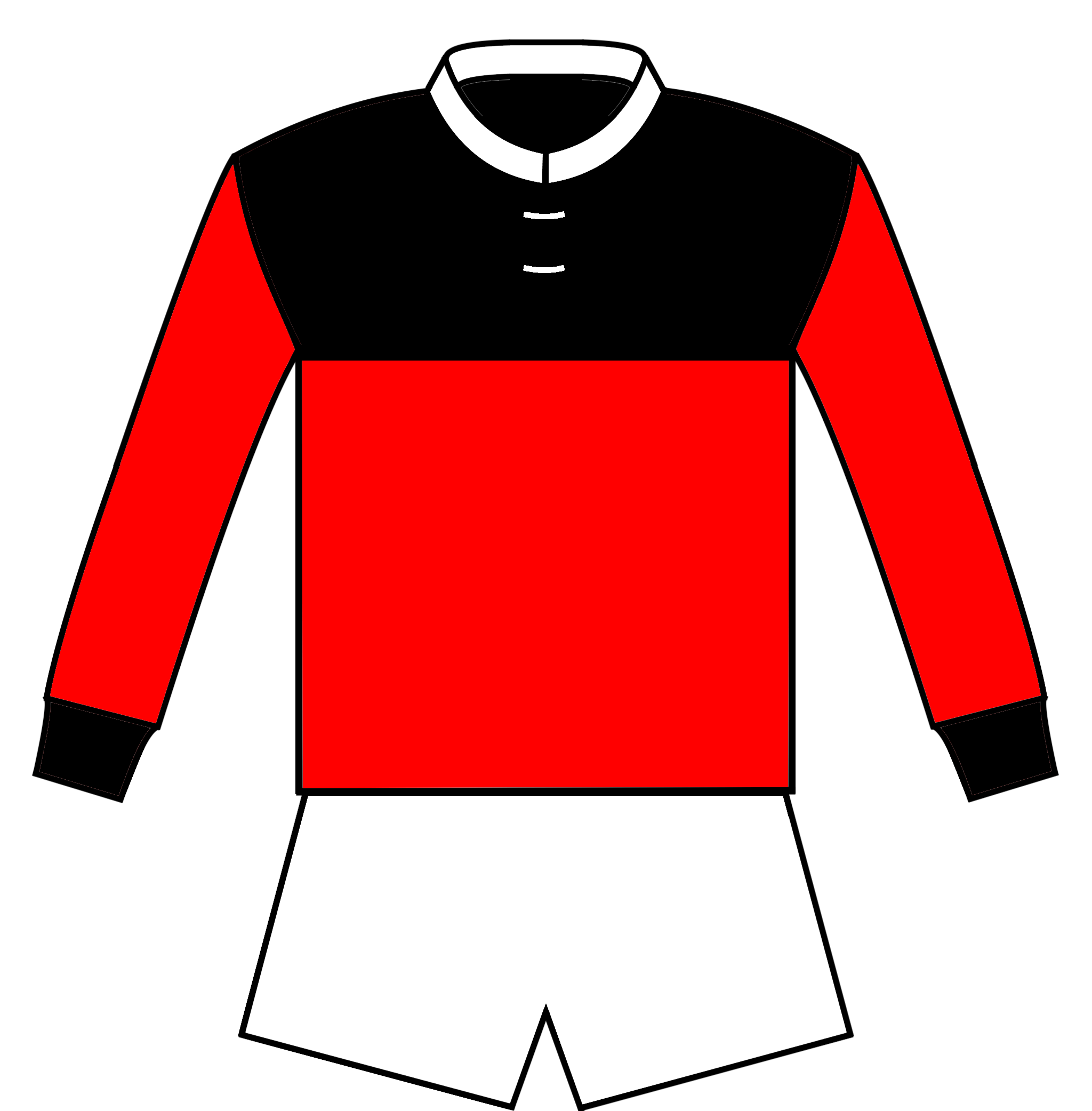
North Sydney 51st season Ground: North Sydney Oval; Coach: Trevor Allen; Captain: Bob Honeysett

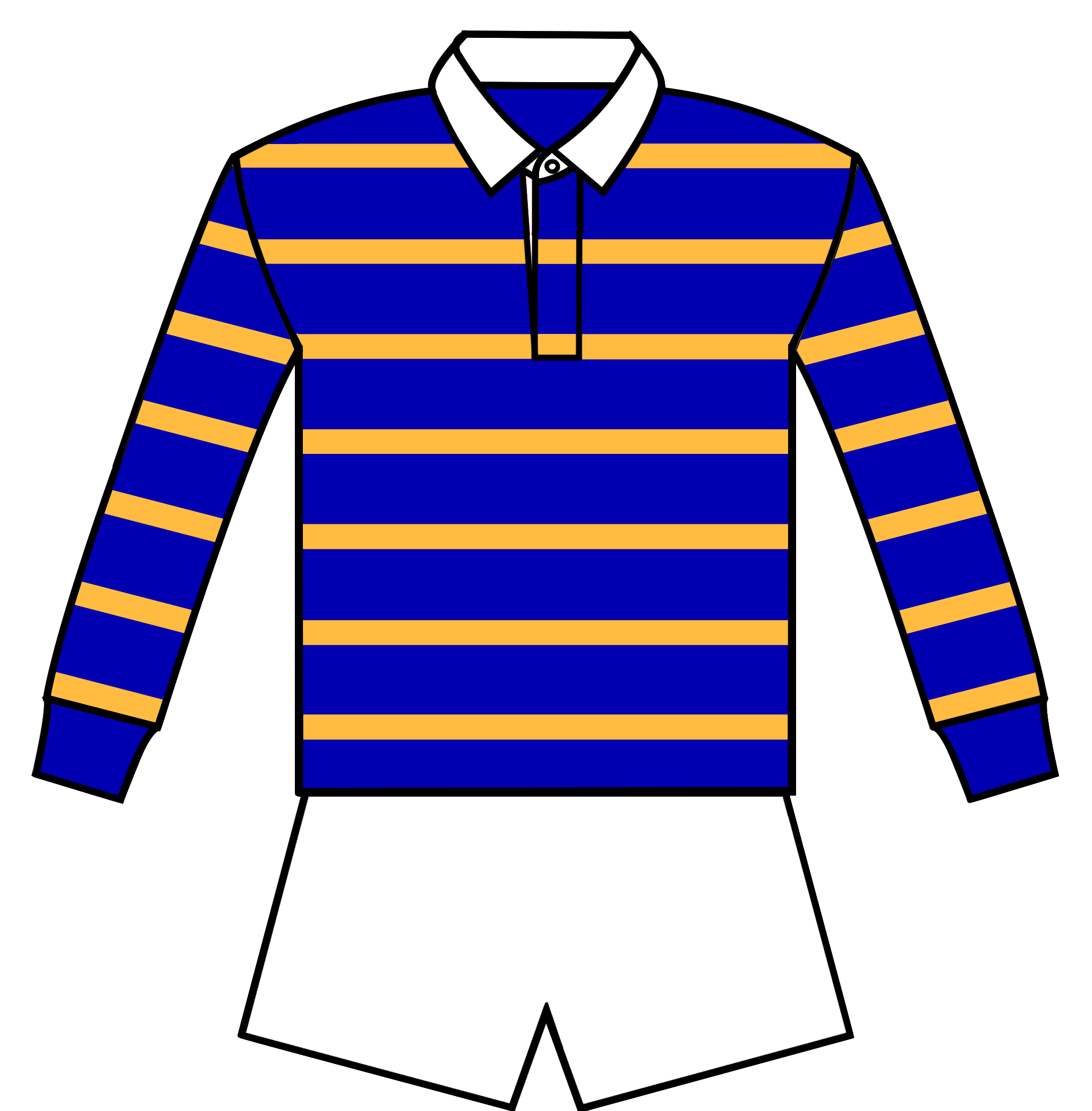
Parramatta 12th season Ground: Cumberland Oval; Coach: Jack Rayner; Captain: Roy Fisher

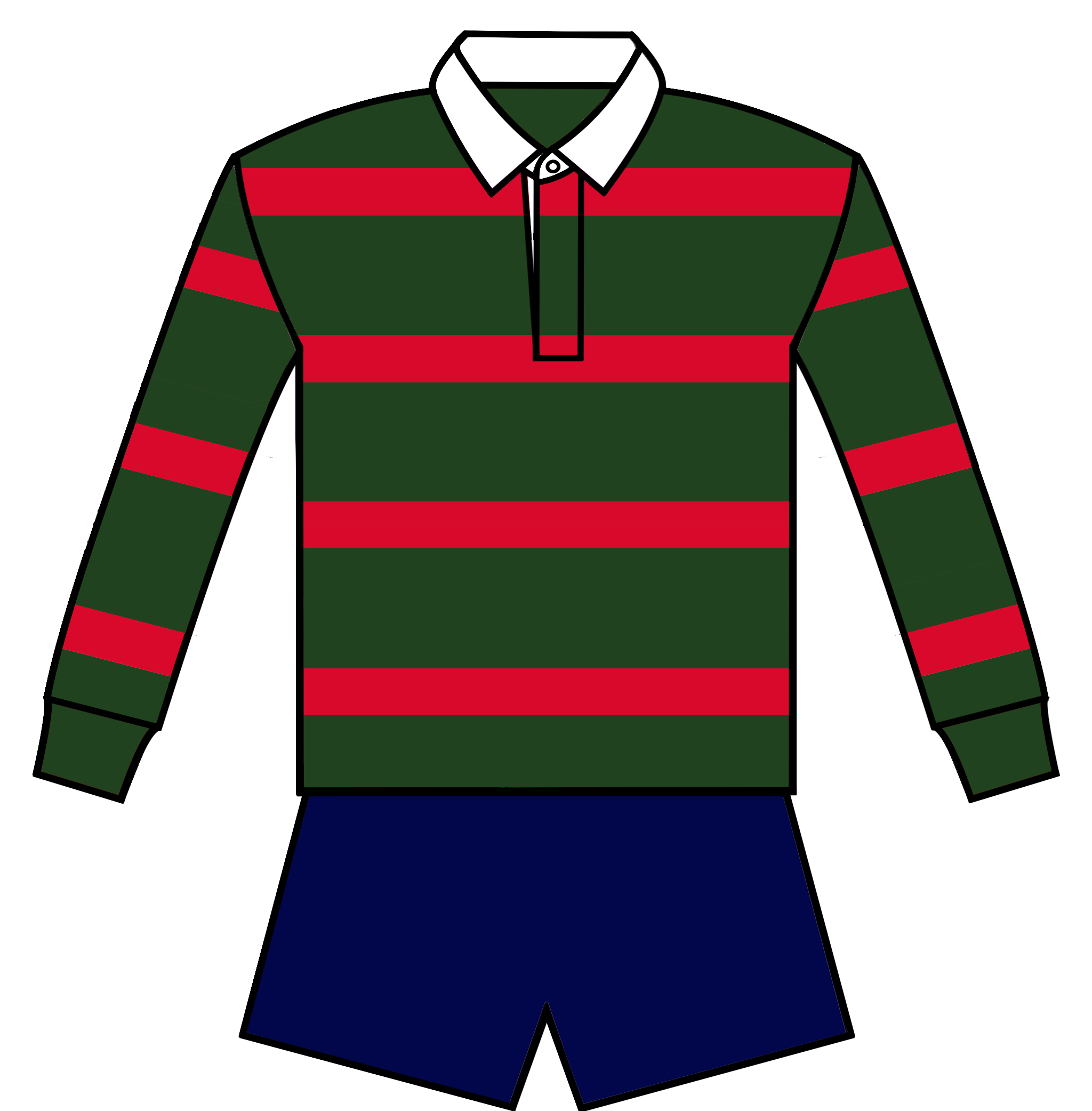
South Sydney 51st season Ground: Redfern Oval; Captain-Coach: Clive Churchill

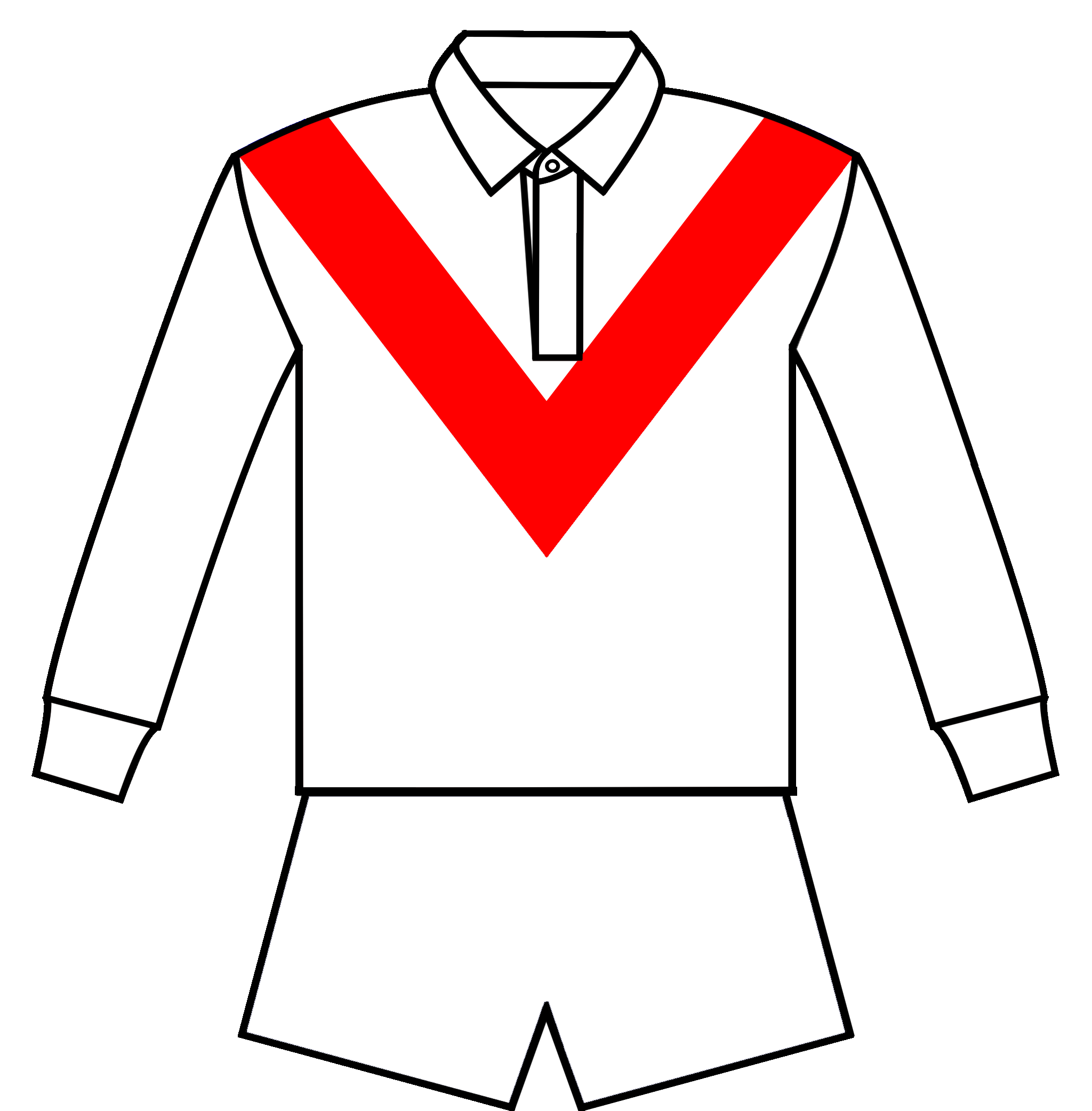
St. George 38th season Ground: Jubilee Oval; Captain-coach: Ken Kearney

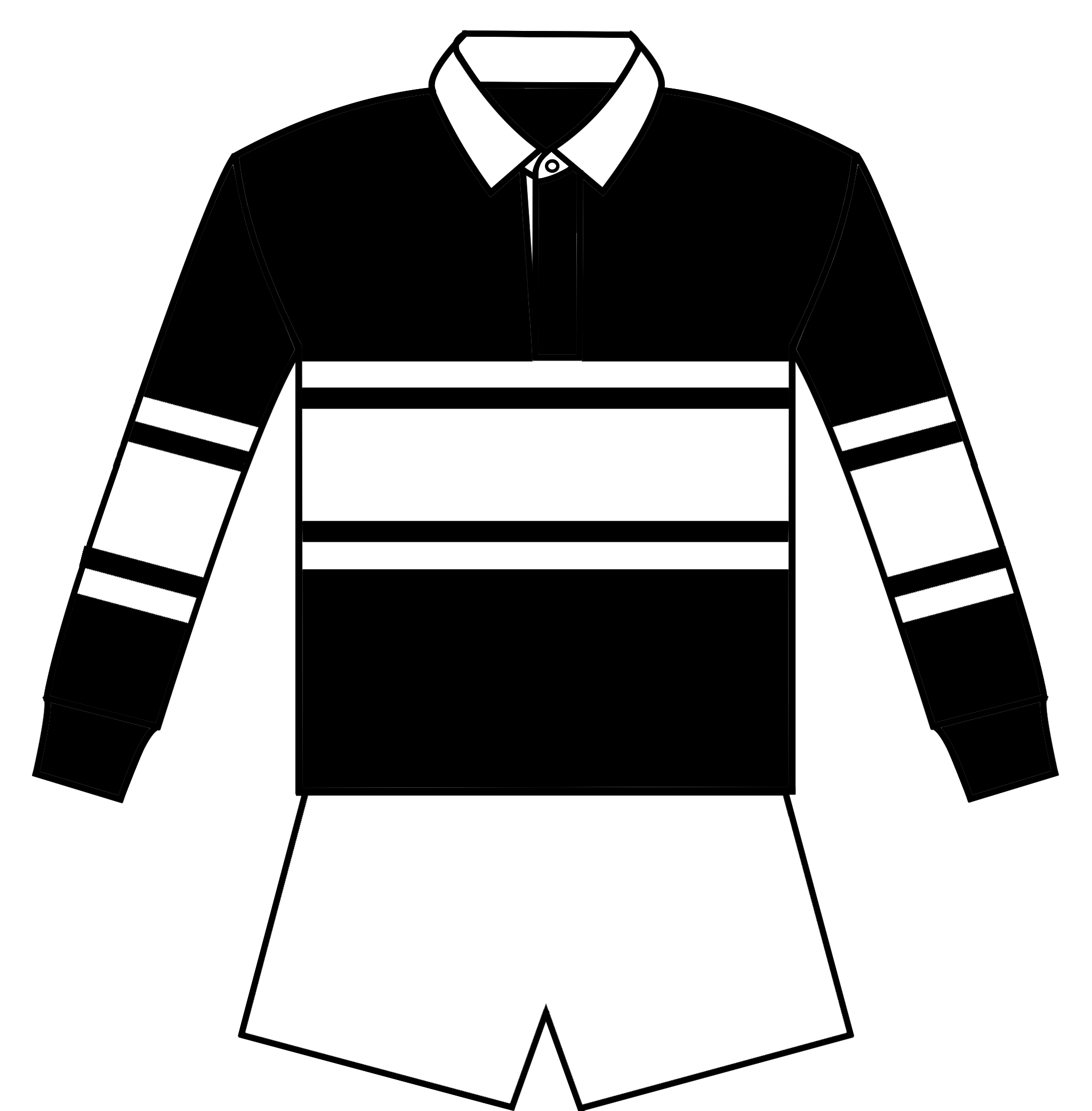
Western Suburbs 51st season Ground: Pratten Park; Coach: Vic Hey; Captain: Harry Wells

=== Ladder ===
	Team	Pld	W	D	L	PF	PA	PD	Pts
1	St. George	18	16	0	2	480	187	+293	32
2	Western Suburbs	18	12	0	6	379	263	+116	24
3	Manly	18	11	1	6	291	251	+40	23
4	Newtown	18	10	0	8	297	252	+45	20
5	Balmain	18	10	0	8	254	273	−19	20
6	North Sydney	18	9	0	9	279	322	−43	18
7	Eastern Suburbs	18	8	0	10	244	252	−8	16
8	South Sydney	18	6	0	12	246	391	−145	12
9	Canterbury	18	4	1	13	207	276	−69	9
10	Parramatta	18	3	0	15	202	412	−210	6

== Finals ==
The developing Western Suburbs side which would become such a force at the beginning of the 1960s, was already building around the class of internationals Keith "Yappy" Holman, Harry "Dealer" Wells, Kel "Twigs" O'Shea along with their hard men Neville "Boxhead" Charlton, Mark Patch and fiery nineteen-year-old Peter Dimond. With a simple game plan of "retaliate first", the Magpies' aggression in the semifinal stunned St George who were coming off a coasting run through the end of the season. In spite of having beaten Wests twice in the regular season, the Dragons were mauled by them 34–10 in the major-semi final with Dimond dominating his opposite five-eighth Peter Carroll and forcing the Dragons to a sudden death final against Balmain for the right to defend their title.

The lessons from this loss sat heavily with St George – how an early forward onslaught designed to knock the spirit of the rival pack could determine the course of the entire game. For the next eight years, in all of their finals appearances, the Dragons would play a deliberate tactic of giving the opposition the ball in the first fifteen minutes and setting about demoralising them with brutal defence.

Home	Score	Away	Match information
Home	Score	Away	Date and time	Venue	Referee	Crowd
Playoff
Newtown	4–15	Balmain	19 August 1958	Redfern Oval		10,430
Semifinals
Manly-Warringah	10–22	Balmain	23 August 1958	Sydney Cricket Ground	Darcy Lawler	27,985
St. George	10–34	Western Suburbs	30 August 1958	Sydney Cricket Ground	Darcy Lawler	38,857
Preliminary Final
St. George	26–21	Balmain	6 September 1958	Sydney Cricket Ground	Darcy Lawler	39,132
Grand Final
Western Suburbs	9–20	St. George	13 September 1958	Sydney Cricket Ground	Darcy Lawler	62,283

=== Grand Final ===
St. George	Position	Western Suburbs
1. Brian Graham	FB	1. Darcy Russell
2. Eddie Lumsden	WG	2. Bernard Kelly
19. Ray Smith	CE	3. Harry Wells (c)
4. Geoff Weekes	CE	6. Darcy Henry
17. Brian Messiter	WG	5. Don Malone
8. Brian Clay	FE	4. Peter Dimond
7. Bob Bugden	HB	7. Keith Holman
13. Billy Wilson	PR	13. Mark Patch
12. Ken Kearney (Ca./Co.)	HK	12. Bede Goff
10. Harry Bath	PR	11. Neville Charlton
24. Monty Porter	SR	10. Bill Carson
9. Norm Provan	SR	9. Jack Bowman
8. Peter Provan	LK	8. Doug Jones
	Coach	Vic Hey

In an effort to negate Peter Dimond, Saints dropped Peter Carroll for the Grand Final, selecting lock and hard hitting defender, Brian Clay at five-eighth. From the kick-off, the record crowd saw a furious St George team lay into Wests. High tackles and punches were the order of the day and referee Darcy Lawler penalised the Dragons seventeen times to Wests seven.

Wests were unable to counter the onslaught which saw a ruthless Dragon defence advancing upon them at every opportunity although the score remained close for most of the match. Eventually with the Magpies subdued, Norm Provan and Bob Bugden cut loose, with Provan scoring two tries and Bugden snatching an intercept try near the end. Saints won the fight, and the match. For eighty minutes Clay was all over Dimond who ended the match dazed and bleeding.

The Sydney Morning Herald described the match as the most “savage” game of the season.

St George 20 (Tries: N. Provan 2, Bugden, Lumsden. Goals: Bath 4.)

Wests 9 (Tries: Russell. Goals: Russell 3 )

== Player statistics ==
The following statistics are as of the conclusion of Round 18.

Top 5 point scorers

Points	Player	Tries	Goals	Field Goals
205	Harry Bath	3	98	0
176	Darcy Russell	2	85	0
146	Brian Carlson	10	58	0
144	Ron Willey	4	66	0
124	Gordon Clifford	0	62	0

Top 5 try scorers

Tries	Player
16	Brian Allsop
15	Eddie Lumsden
13	Jack Fifield
13	Peter Dimond
12	Darcy Henry
12	Kevin Considine

Top 5 goal scorers

Goals	Player
98	Harry Bath
85	Darcy Russell
66	Ron Willey
62	Gordon Clifford
58	Brian Carlson

== Great Britain Lions Tour ==
From May until August, the Great Britain Lions toured Australia and New Zealand. In Australia they played the three Test Ashes series against Australia as well as games against various sides including Sydney Firsts, New South Wales and a Sydney Representative Colts side that featured a young Reg Gasnier.

The team was coached by Jim Brough and was captained was Alan Prescott.

Note: Other than the Ashes Tests, only games in NSW listed

Game	Date	Result	Venue	Attendance
1	18 May	Great Britain def. Southern Districts 36–18	Wollongong Showground, Wollongong	
2	21 May	Great Britain drew with Western Districts 24–24	Wade Park, Orange	
3	24 May	Great Britain def. Newcastle 35–16	Newcastle Sportsground, Newcastle	21,126
4	28 May	Great Britain def. Northern NSW 27–17	Scully Park, Tamworth	
5	31 May	Great Britain def. Sydney 20–15	Sydney Cricket Ground, Sydney	48,692
6	4 June	Great Britain def. Riverina 29–10	Leeton	6,000
7	7 June	Great Britain def. New South Wales 19–10	Sydney Cricket Ground, Sydney	52,963
8	14 June	Australia def. Great Britain 25–8	Sydney Cricket Ground, Sydney	68,777
15	5 July	Great Britain def. Australia 25–18	Brisbane Exhibition Ground, Brisbane	33,563
17	13 July	Great Britain def. NSW North Coast 56–15	Oakes Oval, Oakes Oval, Lismore	5,541
18	19 July	Great Britain def. Australia 28–26	Sydney Cricket Ground, Sydney	68,720
??	14 August	Representative Colts vs Great Britain	Sydney Cricket Ground, Sydney	
??	17 August	Coalfields vs Great Britain	Maitland Showground, Maitland	
