= Kaeo Weekes =

Australian rugby league footballer

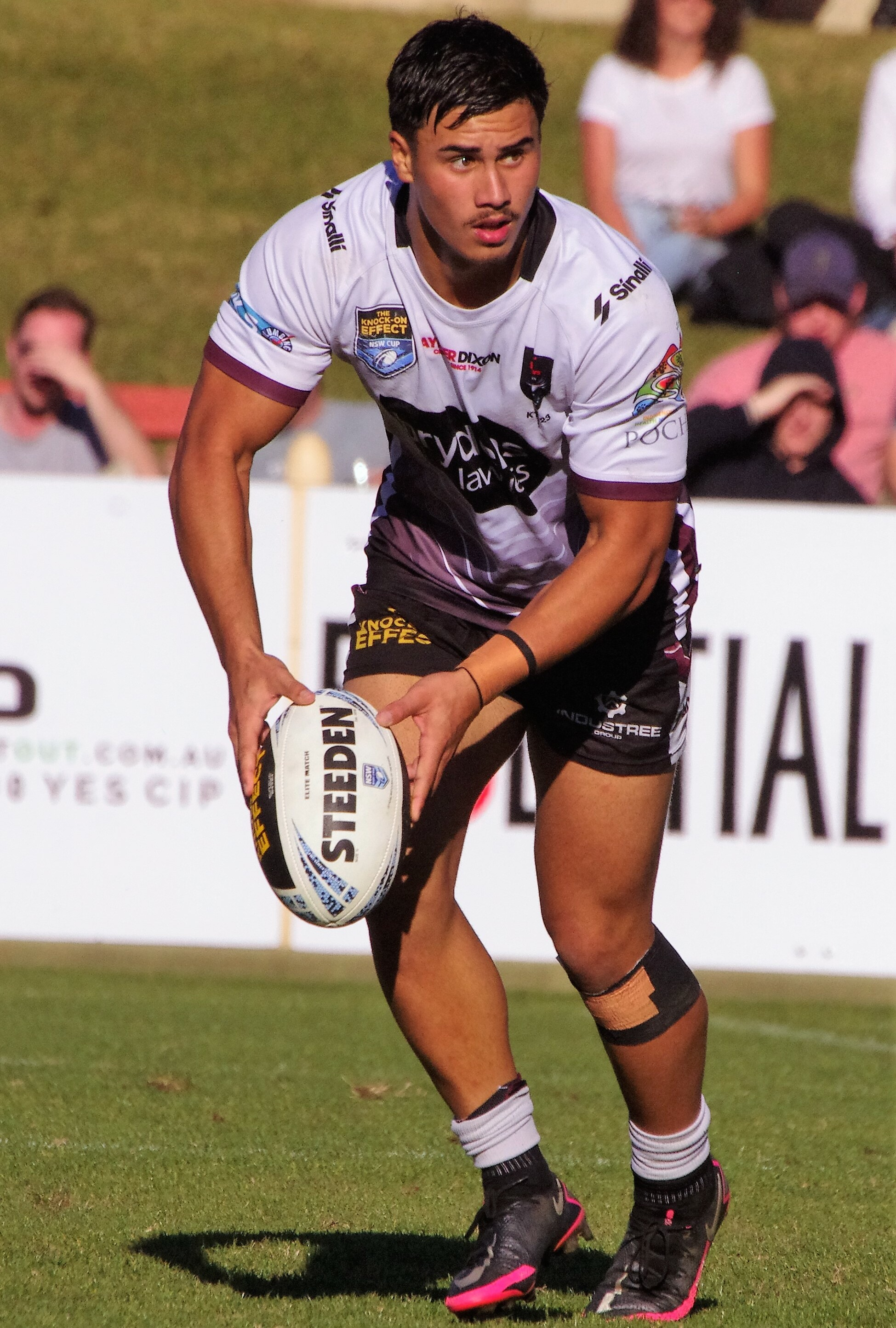

Personal information
- Full name: Kaeo Alan Weekes
- Born: 6 February 2002 (age 24) Sydney, New South Wales, Australia
- Height: 183 cm (6 ft 0 in)
- Weight: 90 kg (14 st 2 lb)

Playing information
- Position: Fullback, Halfback
Club
Years	Team	Pld	T	G	FG	P
2022–23	Manly Sea Eagles	12	1	0	0	4
2024–	Canberra Raiders	66	33	8	0	148
	Total	78	34	8	0	152
Representative
Years	Team	Pld	T	G	FG	P
2024	Prime Minister's XIII	1	2	0	0	8
- Source: As of 5 September 2026

Kaeo Alan Weekes (born 6 February 2002) is an Australian professional rugby league footballer who plays as a fullback or halfback for the Canberra Raiders in the National Rugby League.

He previously played for the Manly Warringah Sea Eagles.

== Background ==
Weekes was born in Australia and is of Cook Island and Māori descent. He is the grandson of former St George Dragons and Parramatta centre Geoff Weekes (1932–2015). The elder Weekes played for the Dragons from 1954 to 1961, playing in the centres in their 1958 and 1959 Grand Final wins before joining the Eels for 2 seasons and retiring after the 1963 NSWRFL season.

Weekes studied at Newington College. He played his first season in the Harold Matthews Cup in 2017, scoring 11 tries despite playing up an age group.

He is a product of the Asquith Magpies junior club in the North Sydney Bears district.

Weekes attended the Sea Eagles Pathways Academy and was a prolific try scorer in the SG Ball and Harold Matthews competitions after joining Manly at 14 years of age. He joined the development squad at Manly in 2021. Weekes joined the Canberra Raiders in 2024.

== Playing career ==
=== 2022 & 2023 ===
Weekes made his NRL debut in round 19 of the 2022 NRL season against the St. George Illawarra Dragons playing 13 minutes off the bench. In the 2023 NRL season, Weekes played nine games for the Manly club. On 15 October 2023, Weekes signed a two-year deal with Canberra starting in 2024.

=== 2024 ===
In round 8 of the 2024 NRL season, Weekes made his club debut for Canberra in their 40-0 loss against Cronulla. The following week, he scored a try and kicked three goals in the clubs comeback victory against his former club Manly. On 24 September, Weekes had re-signed with the club until the end of the 2027 season.

=== 2025 ===
On 25 July, Canberra announced that Weekes extended his contract for a further two years until the end of 2029. In round 25 of the 2025 NRL season, Weekes scored the winning try in golden point extra-time as Canberra defeated Penrith 20-16. Weekes played 25 matches for Canberra in the 2025 NRL season as the club claimed the Minor Premiership. He played in both finals matches as Canberra went out in straight sets losing to both Brisbane and Cronulla.

=== 2026 ===
Weekes played 24 games for Canberra in the 2026 NRL season and scored 14 tries as the club finished 11th on the table and missed the finals.

== Statistics ==
Year	Team	Games	Tries	Goals	Pts
2022	Manly Warringah Sea Eagles	3	0	0	0
2023	Manly Warringah Sea Eagles	9	1	0	4
2024	Canberra Raiders	17	8	6/10	44
2025	Canberra Raiders	25	11	2/3	48
2026	Canberra Raiders	24	14	0	56
	Totals	78	34	8/13	152
