= 1959 NSWRFL season =

Rugby league competition

1959 New South Wales Rugby Football League
- Teams: 10
- Premiers: St. George (6th title)
- Minor premiers: St. George (6th title)
- Matches played: 94
- Points scored: 3107
- Attendance: 896911
- Top points scorer(s): Darcy Russell (206)
- Wooden spoon: Parramatta (7th spoon)
- Top try-scorer(s): Ken Irvine (19)

1959's New South Wales Rugby Football League premiership was the 52nd season of the rugby league competition based in Sydney. Ten teams from across the city competed for the J. J. Giltinan Shield during the season, which culminated in a grand final between St. George and Manly-Warringah.

== Season summary ==
The St. George team went through the 1959 season undefeated – a feat achieved by five teams prior to 1959 but by none since. The club won nineteen of their twenty matches and played a draw against Balmain. They were able to score more than forty points on six occasions. After eighteen premiership rounds St. George had scored an average of over thirty points per match and conceded an average of ten points.

Future Immortals Reg Gasnier and Johnny Raper both debuted for St. George in first grade in 1959 and both made the Australian side, aged just 19. Seven St. George players made that year's Kangaroo Tour.

The 1959 season also saw the retirement from the League of future Australian Rugby League Hall of Fame inductee, Harry Bath.

=== Teams ===
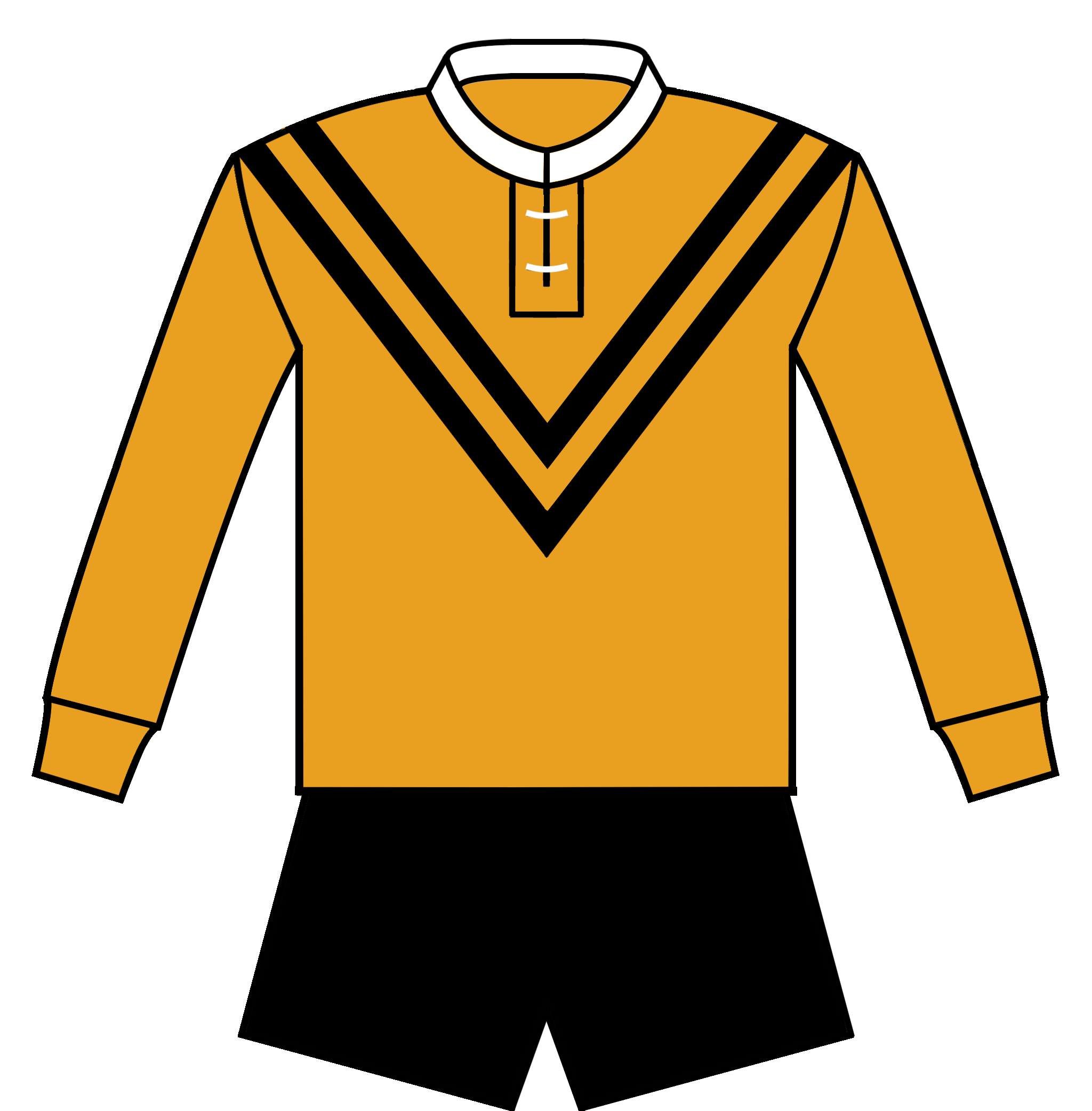
Balmain 52nd season Ground: Leichhardt Oval; Coach: John O'Toole; Captain: Keith Barnes

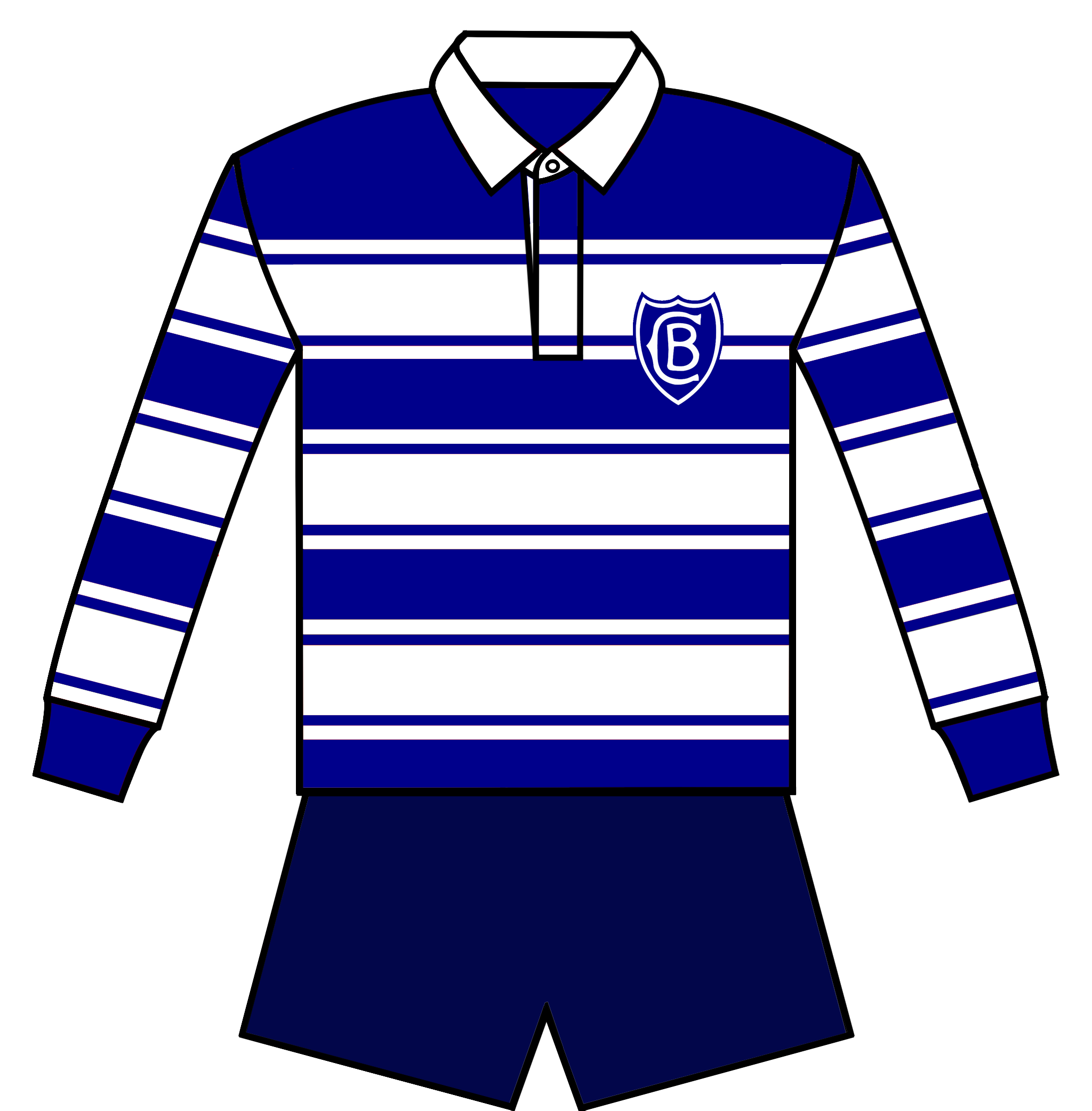
Canterbury-Bankstown 25th season Ground: Belmore Oval; Coach: Cec Cooper; Captain: Brian Davies

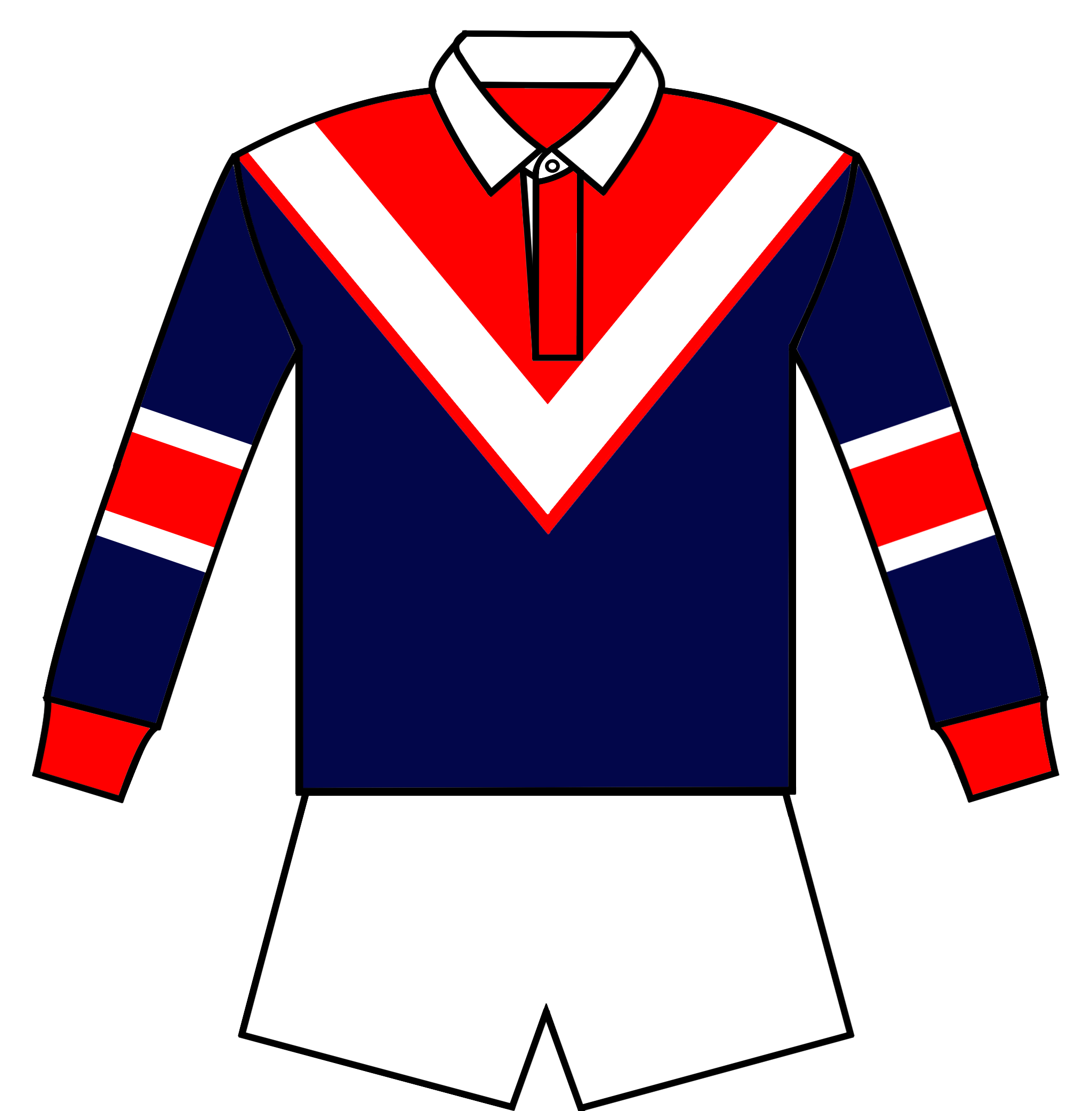
Eastern Suburbs 52nd season Ground: Sydney Sports Ground; Coach: Dave Brown; Captain: Terry Fearnley

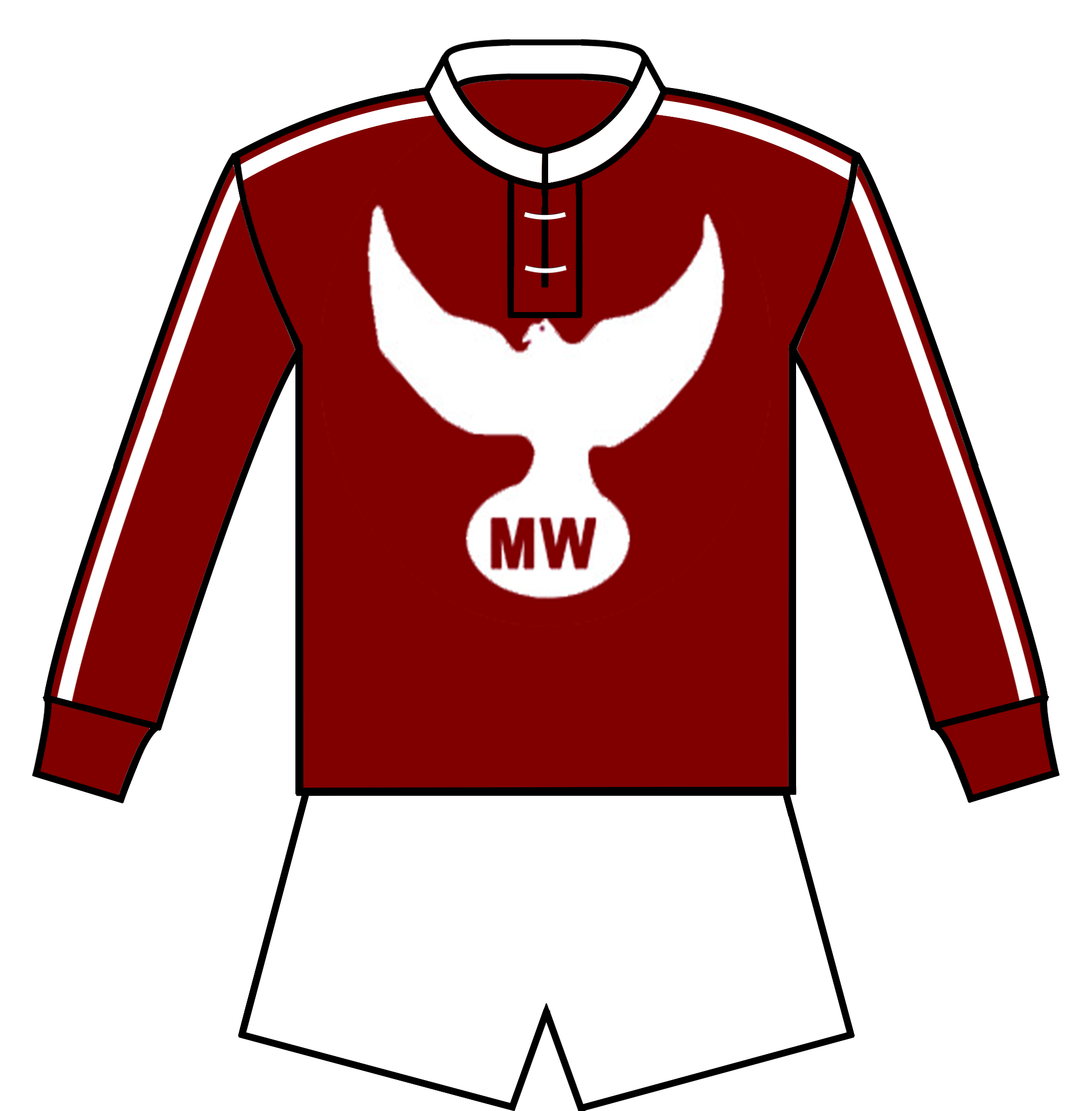
Manly-Warringah 13th season Ground: Brookvale Oval; Coach: Ken Arthurson; Captain: Ron Willey

Newtown 52nd season Ground: Henson Park; Coach: Charles Cahill; Captain: Tony Brown

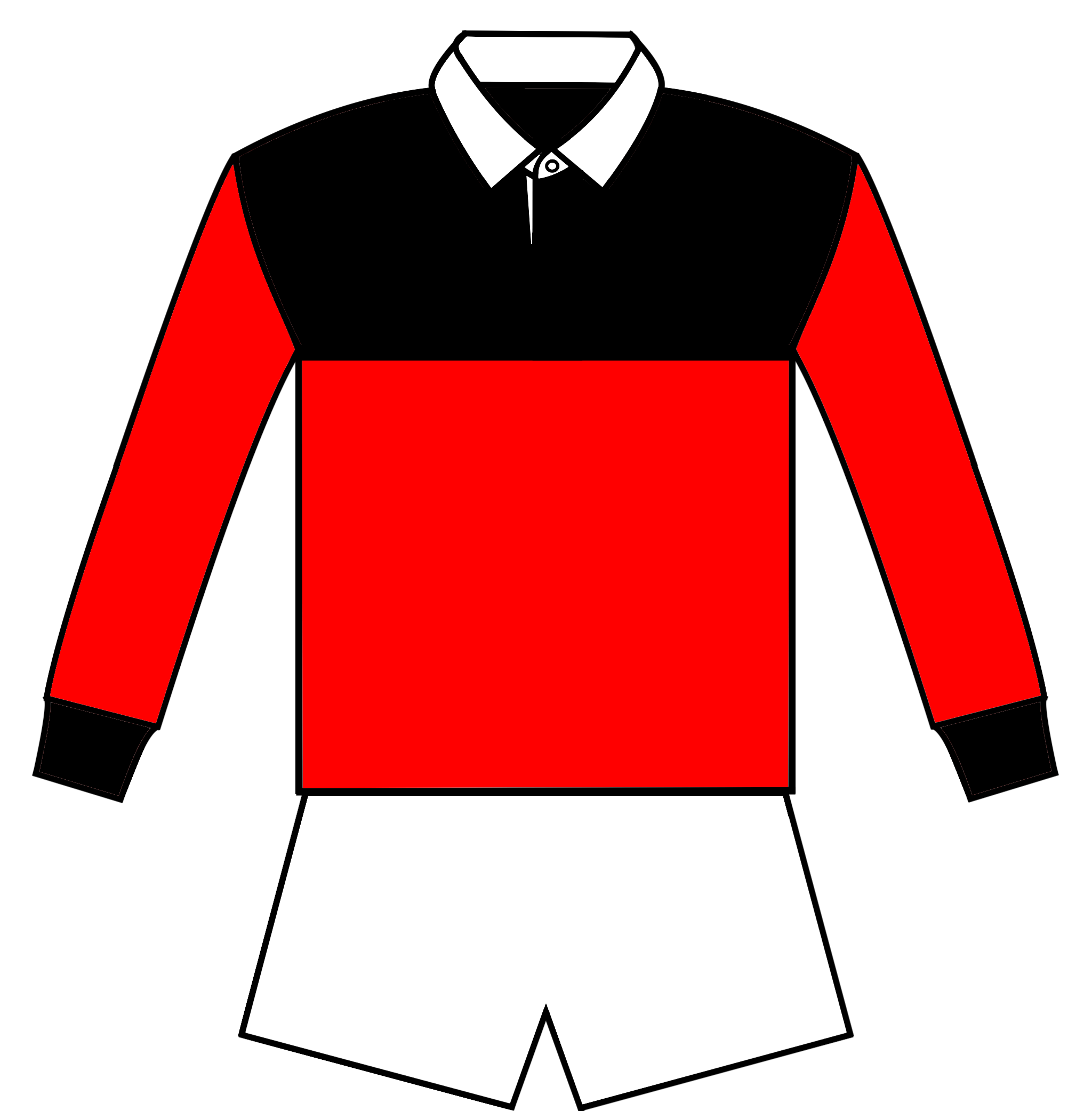
North Sydney 52nd season Ground: North Sydney Oval; Coach: Ross McKinnon; Captain: Bob Honeysett

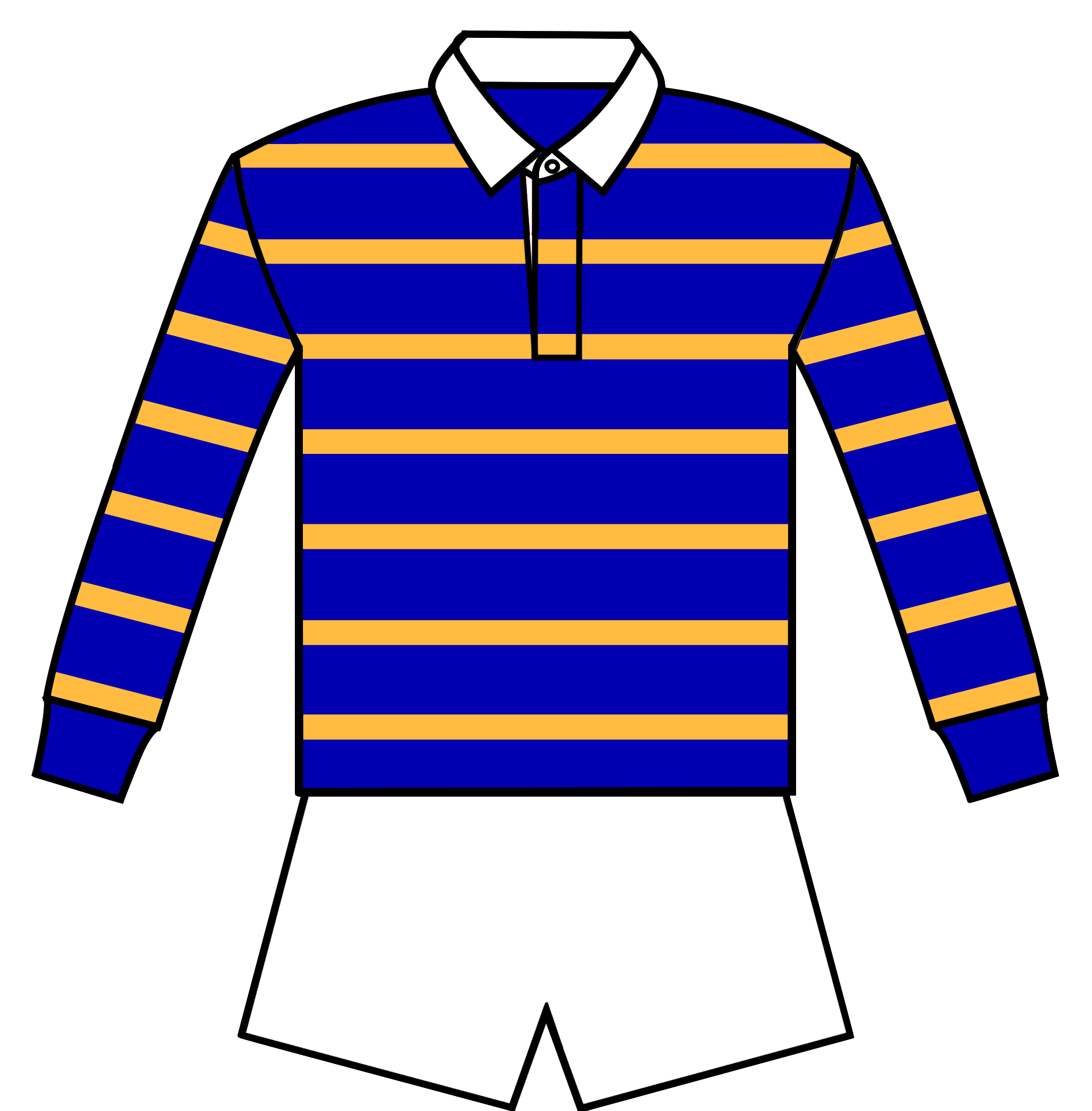
Parramatta 13th season Ground: Cumberland Oval; Coach: Jack Rayner; Captain: Roy Fisher

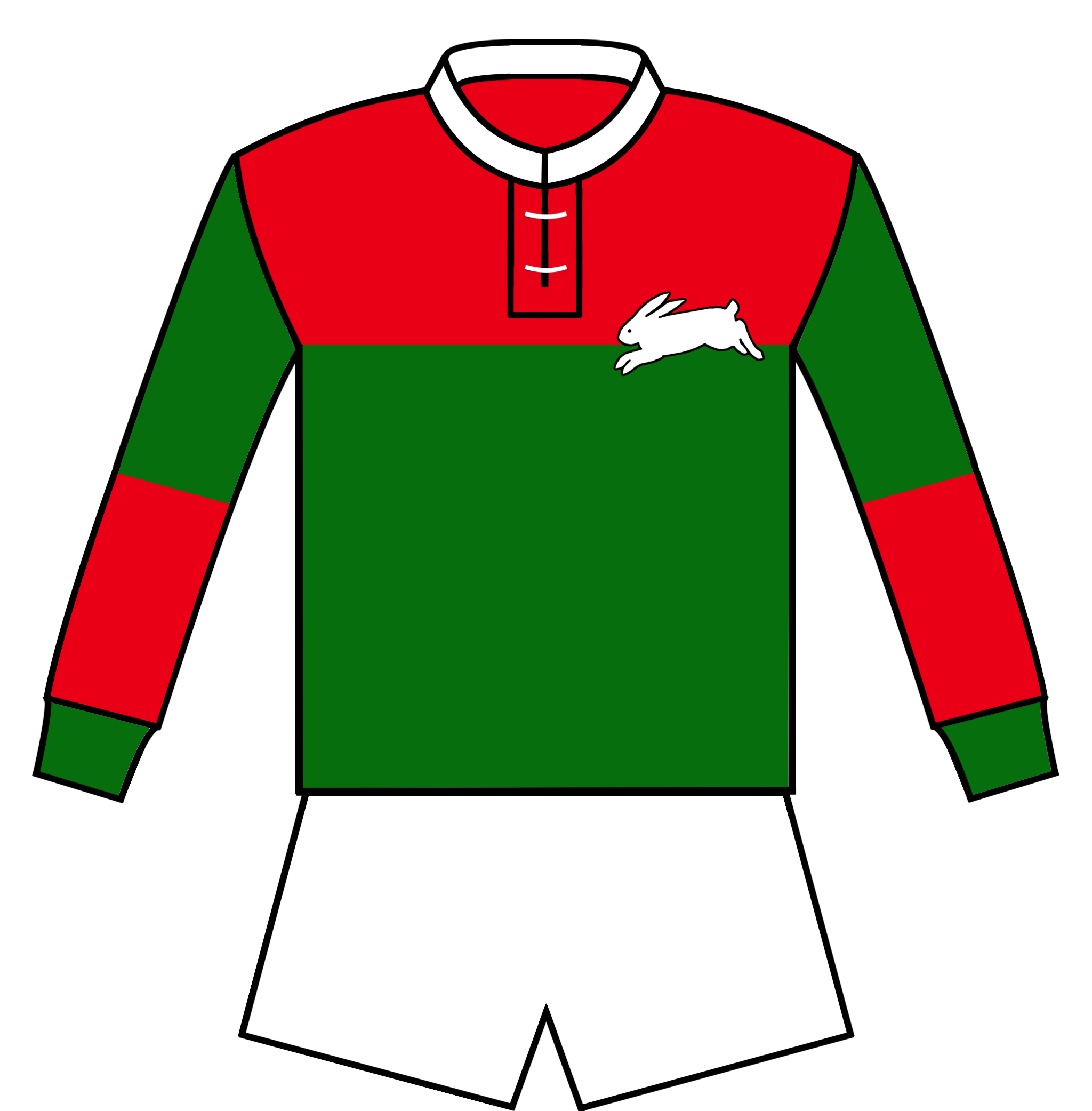
South Sydney 52nd season Ground: Redfern Oval; Coach: Denis Donoghue; Captain: Bernie Purcell

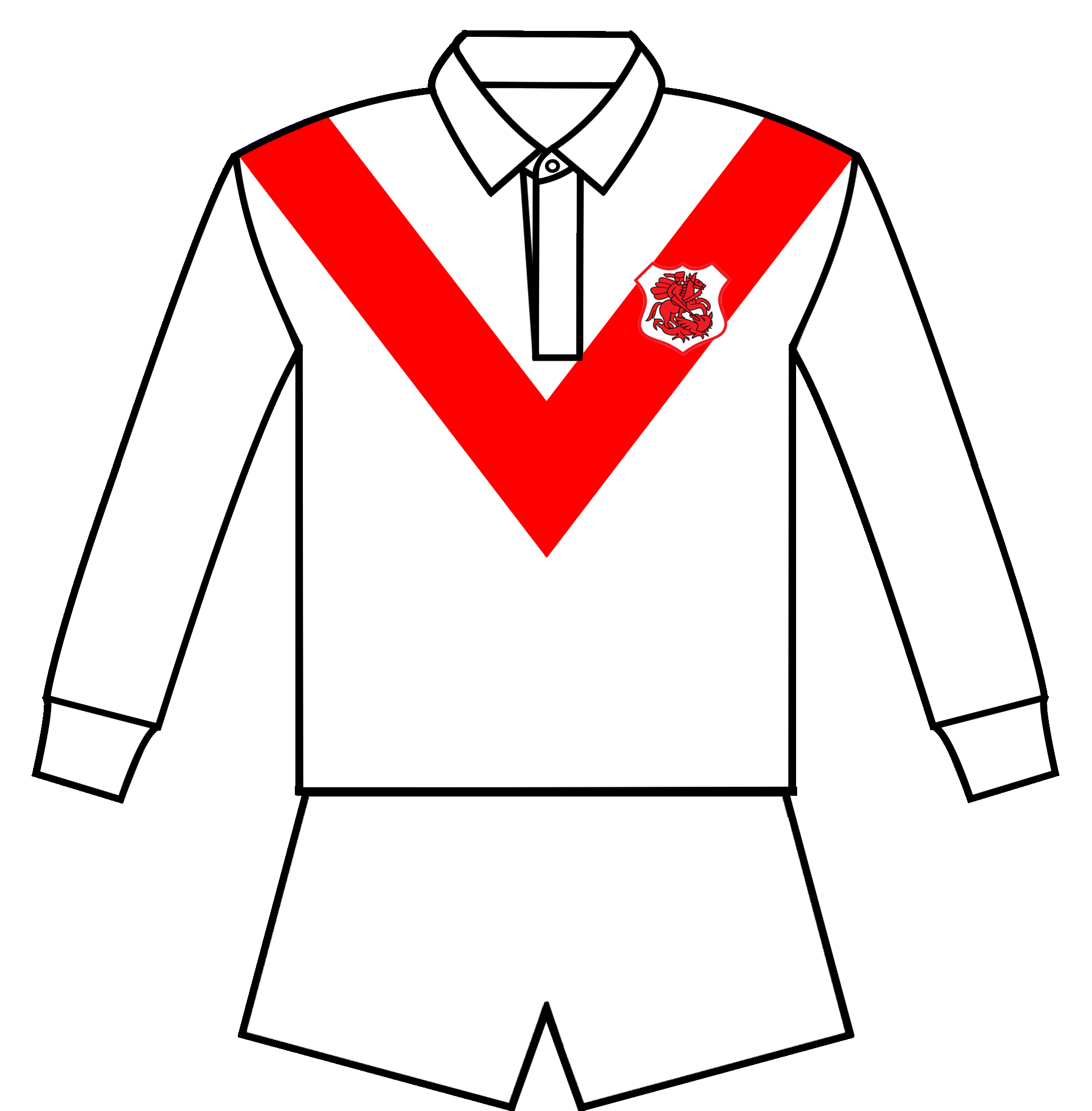
St. George 39th season Ground: Kogarah Oval; Captain-coach: Ken Kearney

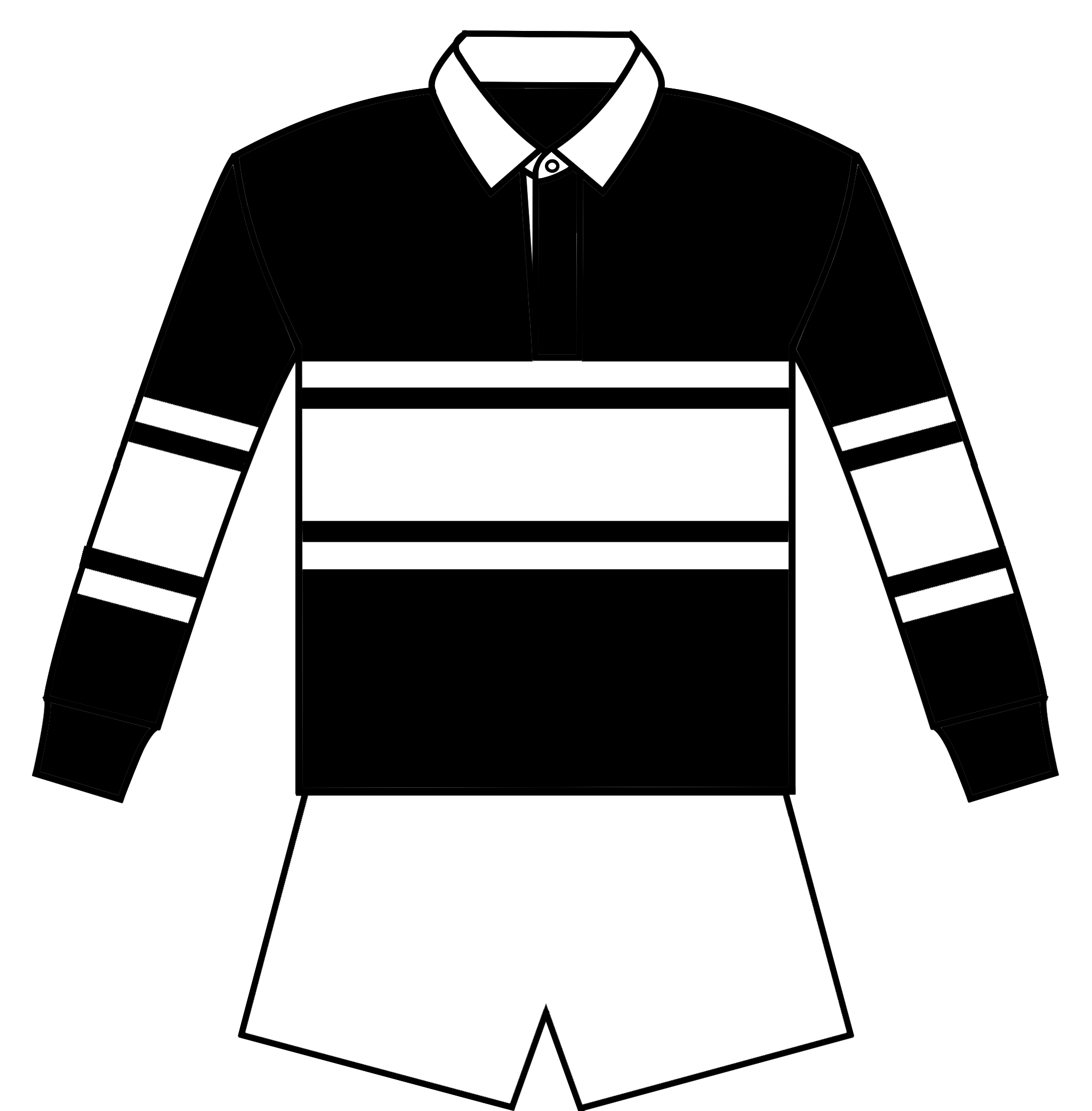
Western Suburbs 52nd season Ground: Pratten Park; Coach: Vic Hey; Captain: Dick Poole

== Regular season ==
Team	1	2	3	4	5	6	7	8	9	10	11	12	13	14	15	16	17	18	F1	F2	F3	GF
Balmain	MAN −3	**STG** **−14**	CBY −4	**EAS** **+12**	NOR −8	**WES** **−19**	**PAR** **+8**	NEW −15	**SOU** **+9**	**MAN** **−2**	STG; 0	**CBY** **+12**	EAS −4	**NOR** **+6**	WES −9	PAR +16	**NEW** **−5**	SOU −8				
Canterbury-Bankstown	SOU −10	MAN −6	**BAL** **+4**	**STG** **−12**	EAS −9	**NOR** **−33**	WES −38	**PAR** **+7**	**NEW** **−12**	**SOU** **−1**	**MAN** **+5**	BAL −12	STG −51	**EAS** **+6**	NOR −22	**WES**; **0**	PAR +1	NEW −1				
Eastern Suburbs	NEW −3	SOU −20	**MAN** **−11**	BAL −12	**CBY** **+9**	**STG** **−9**	NOR −20	**WES** **−3**	PAR −4	**NEW** **+7**	**SOU** **+9**	MAN −12	**BAL** **+4**	CBY −6	**STG** **−16**	**NOR** **+6**	WES −28	**PAR** **+6**				
Manly-Warringah	**BAL** **+3**	**CBY** **+6**	EAS +11	NOR −7	WES −11	PAR +5	**NEW** **−4**	SOU +8	**STG** **−10**	BAL +2	CBY −5	**EAS** **+12**	NOR +1	**WES** **−3**	**PAR** **+21**	NEW +17	SOU +3	STG −5	**NEW** **+17**	X	WES +1	STG −20
Newtown	**EAS** **+3**	**NOR** **−6**	WES −7	PAR +9	**STG** **−17**	**SOU** **+2**	MAN +4	**BAL** **+15**	CBY +12	EAS −7	NOR +2	**WES** **−2**	**PAR** **+8**	**STG** **−35**	SOU −12	**MAN** **−17**	BAL +5	**CBY** **+1**	MAN −17			
North Sydney	PAR +23	NEW +6	**SOU** **+20**	**MAN** **+7**	**BAL** **+8**	CBY +33	**EAS** **+20**	**STG** **−21**	**WES** **−5**	**PAR** **+20**	**NEW** **−2**	SOU −10	**MAN** **−1**	BAL −6	**CBY** **+22**	EAS −6	**STG** **−7**	WES −12				
Parramatta	**NOR** **−23**	**WES** **−10**	STG −39	**NEW** **−9**	SOU +5	**MAN** **−5**	BAL −8	CBY −7	**EAS** **+4**	NOR −20	WES −22	**STG** **−57**	NEW −8	**SOU** **−6**	MAN −21	**BAL** **−16**	**CBY** **−1**	EAS −6				
South Sydney	**CBY** **+10**	**EAS** **+20**	NOR −20	**WES** **+1**	**PAR** **−5**	NEW −2	**STG** **−33**	**MAN** **−8**	BAL −9	CBY +1	EAS −9	**NOR** **+10**	WES +5	PAR +6	**NEW** **+12**	**STG** **−3**	**MAN** **−3**	**BAL** **+8**				
St. George	WES +1	BAL +14	**PAR** **+39**	CBY +12	NEW +17	EAS +9	SOU +33	NOR +21	MAN +10	**WES** **+30**	**BAL**; **0**	PAR +57	**CBY** **+51**	NEW +35	EAS +16	SOU +3	NOR +7	**MAN** **+5**	X	**WES** **+10**	X	**MAN** **+20**
Western Suburbs	**STG** **−1**	PAR +10	**NEW** **+7**	SOU −1	**MAN** **+11**	BAL +19	**CBY** **+38**	EAS +3	NOR +5	STG −30	**PAR** **+22**	NEW +2	**SOU** **−5**	MAN +3	**BAL** **+9**	CBY; 0	**EAS** **+28**	**NOR** **+12**	X	STG −10	**MAN** **−1**	
Team	1	2	3	4	5	6	7	8	9	10	11	12	13	14	15	16	17	18	F1	F2	F3	GF

Bold – Home game
X – Bye
Opponent for round listed above margin

=== Ladder ===
	Team	Pld	W	D	L	PF	PA	PD	Pts
1	St. George	18	17	1	0	550	190	+360	35
2	Western Suburbs	18	13	1	4	405	273	+132	27
3	Manly	18	11	0	7	283	239	+44	22
4	Newtown	18	10	0	8	254	296	-42	20
5	North Sydney	18	9	0	9	371	282	+89	18
6	South Sydney	18	9	0	9	257	276	-19	18
7	Balmain	18	6	1	11	308	336	-28	13
8	Eastern Suburbs	18	6	0	12	211	314	-103	12
9	Canterbury	18	5	1	12	194	378	-184	11
10	Parramatta	18	2	0	16	150	399	-249	4

=== Ladder progression ===
- Numbers highlighted in green indicate that the team finished the round inside the top 4.
- Numbers highlighted in blue indicates the team finished first on the ladder in that round.
- Numbers highlighted in red indicates the team finished last place on the ladder in that round.

	Team	1	2	3	4	5	6	7	8	9	10	11	12	13	14	15	16	17	18
1	St. George	2	4	6	8	10	12	14	16	18	20	21	23	25	27	29	31	33	35
2	Western Suburbs	0	2	4	4	6	8	10	12	14	14	16	18	18	20	22	23	25	27
3	Manly-Warringah	2	4	6	6	6	8	8	10	10	12	12	14	16	16	18	20	22	22
4	Newtown	2	2	2	4	4	6	8	10	12	12	14	14	16	16	16	16	18	20
5	North Sydney	2	4	6	8	10	12	14	14	14	16	16	16	16	16	18	18	18	18
6	South Sydney	2	4	4	6	6	6	6	6	6	8	8	10	12	14	16	16	16	18
7	Balmain	0	0	0	2	2	2	4	4	6	6	7	9	9	11	11	13	13	13
8	Eastern Suburbs	0	0	0	0	2	2	2	2	2	4	6	6	8	8	8	10	10	12
9	Canterbury-Bankstown	0	0	2	2	2	2	2	4	4	4	6	6	6	8	8	9	11	11
10	Parramatta	0	0	0	0	2	2	2	2	4	4	4	4	4	4	4	4	4	4

== Finals ==
Home	Score	Away	Match Information
Home	Score	Away	Date and Time	Venue	Referee	Crowd
Semifinals
Manly-Warringah	17–0	Newtown	25 July 1959	Sydney Cricket Ground	Darcy Lawler	8,967
St. George	35–25	Western Suburbs	1 August 1959	Sydney Cricket Ground	Darcy Lawler	42,347
Preliminary Final
Western Suburbs	13–14	Manly-Warringah	8 August 1959	Sydney Cricket Ground	Darcy Lawler	28,385
Grand Final
St. George	20–0	Manly-Warringah Sea Eagles	15 August 1959	Sydney Cricket Ground	Darcy Lawler	49,457

=== Grand Final ===
St. George	Position	Manly-Warringah
1. Brian Graham	FB	1. Ron Willey (c)
2. Eddie Lumsden	WG	15. Len Wadling
15. Johnny Raper	CE	3. Kevin Mosman
16. Geoff Weekes	CE	4. Bill Lloyd
5. Brian Messiter	WG	5. George Hugo
6. Brian Clay	FE	14. Alf Madden
7. Bob Bugden	HB	19. Peter Burke
13. Harry Bath	PR	13. Bill Delamere
12. Ken Kearney (Ca./Co.)	HK	12. George Lenon
11. Billy Wilson	PR	22. Roy Bull
10. Monty Porter	SR	11. Rex Mossop
9. Norm Provan	SR	9. Peter Diversi
8. Peter Provan	LK	8. Jim Peebles
	Coach	Ken Arthurson

In the lead up to the Grand Final, rumours were circulating that Manly-Warringah's Rex Mossop was carrying a broken cheekbone. From the kick off, Saints' forwards took turns at testing Mossop's injury with Harry Bath giving him particular attention. For most of the match the Manly forward copped a hammering until in frustration, Mossop retaliated by standing on Bath's head. A brawl broke out between the two and the referee Lawler sent both off.

In the meantime, St. George's forwards were steamrolling Manly-Warringah and the red and white backs were cutting loose. Winger Eddie Lumsden had a magnificent match, scoring a hat trick of tries. Lumsden beat Ron Willey cold for his first try and then was on the end of later backline passing bursts for two more.

As the Manly-Warringah pack tired in the second half, experienced St. George second rower Norm Provan began to easily break their defence out wide, linking with his backs and being rewarded himself with a try. Reserve grade centre Geoff Weekes had been promoted when Gasnier and Johnny Riley were both injured in the major semi final. He scored a try as did St. George's steady and safe custodian Brian Graham.

St. George outclassed Manly-Warringah 20–0 in a ruthless display of speed and strength. The match was future Australian Rugby League Hall of Fame inductee Harry Bath's last game.

St. George 20 (Tries: Lumsden 3, Graham, Weekes, N Provan. Goals: Bath 1.)

Manly-Warringah 0

== Player statistics ==
The following statistics are as of the conclusion of Round 18.

Top 5 point scorers

Points	Player	Tries	Goals	Field Goals
189	Harry Bath	5	87	0
189	Darcy Russell	5	87	0
142	Ron Willey	2	68	0
121	Johnny Jones	1	59	0
110	Kevin Considine	10	40	0

Top 5 try scorers

Tries	Player
19	Ken Irvine
18	Brian Messiter
15	Bob Bugden
15	Ron Mack
14	Darcy Henry

Top 5 goal scorers

Goals	Player
87	Harry Bath
87	Darcy Russell
68	Ron Willey
59	Johnny Jones
48	Keith Barnes
