= James Peebles =

James Peebles may refer to:

- Jim Peebles (born 1935), astrophysicist, cosmologist and Nobel laureate
- Jim Peebles (American football) (1920–1997), American football player
- Jim Peebles (rugby league) (1931–2013), Australian rugby league player
- James Martin Peebles (1822–1922), American spiritualist and anti-vaccination activist
