= Barry Russell =

Australian rugby league footballer

Personal information
- Full name: Barry Russell
- Born: 11 January 1934 Sydney, New South Wales, Australia
- Died: 8 December 1998 (aged 64)

Playing information
- Position: Scrum-half
Club
Years	Team	Pld	T	G	FG	P
1954	Eastern Suburbs	2	0	5	0	10
1957	North Sydney	2	1	2	0	7
	Total	4	1	7	0	17
- Source: As of 2 July 2026
- Relatives: Darcy Russell (brother)

Barry Russell (New South Wales, Australia), was a rugby league footballer in the New South Wales Rugby League competition.

Russell played for Eastern Suburbs in the 1954 season and the North Sydney club in 1957.

Barry is the brother of Darcy Russell who also played for the Tricolours.
