= Brian Graham (rugby league) =

Australian rugby league footballer

Personal information
- Full name: Brian Robert Graham
- Born: 1936 (age 89–90) Grafton, New South Wales, Australia

Playing information
- Position: Fullback
Club
Years	Team	Pld	T	G	FG	P
1955–64	St. George	114	20	287	0	634
1965–67	Newtown	35	0	31	0	62
	Total	149	20	318	0	696
Representative
Years	Team	Pld	T	G	FG	P
1959	City NSW	1	0	0	0	0
1959	New South Wales	2	0	0	0	0
- Relatives: Don Graham (brother); Philip Graham (son)

Brian Robert Graham (born 1936) is an Australian former professional rugby league footballer who played in the 1950s and 1960s. A New South Wales representative goal-kicking fullback, he played club football in the NSWRFL Premiership for Sydney's St. George (with whom he won 5 consecutive grand finals) and Newtown.

== Career ==
St. George

Originally from Grafton, New South Wales, Graham started playing first grade for the St. George club in the 1955 NSWRFL season. The following season the club won the first of what would become a record eleven consecutive premierships, but Graham did not play first grade. However, at the end of the 1957 NSWRFL season St. George had again reached the grand final and Graham played at fullback in their 31–9 victory over Manly-Warringah. He also played for Saints and fullback in the 1958 NSWRFL season's grand final victory over Western Suburbs.

== Personal life ==
Married in 1958, Graham and his wife Lola resided in Sydney, Australia, with their three children; Philip Graham, Kerrin Graham and Paul Graham. Graham has 7 grandchildren.

In 1959 Graham gained his first representative honours when he was selected to play at fullback for the City New South Wales rugby league team in their 37–7 victory against Country. He was then chosen as fullback for New South Wales in two matches against Queensland. At the end of the 1959 NSWRFL season Graham again played for St. George at fullback, scoring a try in their 20–0 victory over Manly. He was the 1960 NSWRFL season's top points scorer, and he landed five goals in Saints' 31–6 win against Eastern Suburbs in the premiership decider. In the 1961 ANZAC Day game against Eastern Suburbs Graham sealed his side's win with a 79th-minute penalty in front of 19,386 spectators at the SCG. In the 1961 NSWRFL season decider St. George faced Western Suburbs and defeated them 22–0, with Graham kicking five goals.

In late 1962 and throughout 1963, Graham had his career with Saints curtailed after being transferred to Korea as part his oil company work. He continued playing for St. George in 1964, surpassing Doug Fleming's point scoring record for the club, but after receiving offers from Newtown and Manly-Warringah in early 1965 was transferred to the former for £1,000.

Newtown

Graham commenced playing with Newtown in the 1965 NSWRFL season, and that year took a pay dispute with his former club to the NSWRFL. During the 1967 NSWRFL season Newtown took the club captaincy from Kangaroo forward Paul Quinn and handed it to Graham. This was Graham's last season in first grade.

In 1979 Graham's 19-year-old son Philip started playing first grade for St. George as well.
