= Philip Graham (rugby league) =

Australian former professional rugby league footballer

Phil Graham
Personal information
- Full name: Philip Brian Graham
- Born: 21 July 1959 (age 66); Sydney, New South Wales, Australia

Playing information
- Position: Wing
Club
| Years | Team | Pld | T | G | FG | P |
|---|---|---|---|---|---|---|
| 1979–82 | St. George Dragons | 28 | 6 | 27 | 0 | 72 |
- Source: Whiticker/Hudson
- Father: Brian Graham
- Relatives: Don Graham (uncle)

Philip Graham (born 1959) is an Australian former professional rugby league footballer who played in the 1970s.

== Career ==
Graham was a member of the Cronulla-Sutherland Sharks President's Cup side in 1977, but a desire to play for the St. George Dragons saw him graded at the Dragons in 1979.

As a 19-year-old, he made his first grade debut on 29 July 1979 after being plucked from the Under 23's by coach Harry Bath. Phil Graham had four seasons at the Dragons before retiring at the end of 1982.

Graham was the son of the St. George Dragons fullback from the 1960s, Brian Graham.
