= Ray Smith (rugby league) =

Australian rugby league footballer

Personal information
- Full name: Raymond James Smith
- Born: Sydney, New South Wales, Australia

Playing information
- Position: Centre
Club
Years	Team	Pld	T	G	FG	P
1957–59	St. George	16	5	0	0	15
Representative
Years	Team	Pld	T	G	FG	P
1960–62	New South Wales	6	0	0	0	0
- Source: Whiticker/Hudson

Raymond James Smith is an Australian former rugby league footballer who played in the 1950s and 1960s. He was a two-time premiership winning centre with the St George Dragons in the New South Wales Rugby League competition.

== Playing career ==
A local junior from the Bexley-Kingsgrove Club, Smith came into first grade with the St George Dragons after injuries sustained by Merv Lees and Ross Kite during 1957 and retained his position in first grade for two seasons (1957–1958).

During this time, Smith won two premierships with the premiership winning grand final teams of 1957 and 1958.

His place in the team was taken by a youthful Reg Gasnier in 1959. He finished his career at Thirroul, New South Wales and represented New South Wales on five occasions between 1960 and 1962.
