= Brian Messiter =

Australian rugby league footballer

Personal information
- Full name: Brian Edward Messiter
- Born: c1938 (age 87–88) Sydney, New South Wales, Australia

Playing information
- Position: Wing
Club
Years	Team	Pld	T	G	FG	P
1958–61	St. George	35	28	0	0	84
- Source: Whiticker/Hudson.

Brian Edward Messiter is an Australian former rugby league footballer who played in the 1950s and 1960s.

== Career ==
A local junior from the Sutherland Gravediggers JRLFC, Messiter played on the wing in two winning grand final teams at the St George Dragons.

A first grade player at St George for only three seasons between 1958 and 1960, Messiter featured in two premiership winning teams, the 1958 Grand Final and the famous, undefeated Saints team that won the 1959 Grand Final. His place in the team was taken by the emerging Johnny King in 1960 and he retired the following season.
