= Don Graham (rugby league) =

Australian rugby league footballer

Personal information
- Full name: Donald Richard Graham
- Born: 3 May 1922 Barraba, New South Wales, Australia
- Died: 1 December 1953 (aged 31) Blakehurst, New South Wales, Australia

Playing information
- Position: Five-eighth
Club
Years	Team	Pld	T	G	FG	P
1946–47	St. George	19	6	0	0	18
1947–49	Hunslet	67	16	0	0	48
1949–50	Featherstone	9	3	0	0	9
1950–52	Parramatta	24	5	0	0	15
	Total	119	30	0	0	90
- Relatives: Brian Graham (brother); Philip Graham (nephew)

Donald Richard Graham (3 May 1922 – 1 December 1953) was an Australian rugby league player who played in the 1940s and 1950s.

== Career ==
Originally from Tamworth, New South Wales and after being discharged from the Army, Graham began his Sydney league career in 1946. He played two seasons for St. George between 1946 and 1947 (including the 1946 Grand Final), moving to England he played for Hunslet and Featherstone Rovers, moving back to Australia he played for Parramatta for three seasons between 1950 and 1952.

== Death ==
Graham died in Blakehurst, New South Wales on 1 December 1953 from cancer, aged 31.
