= Geoff Weekes =

Australian rugby league footballer

Personal information
- Full name: Geoffrey Alan Weekes
- Born: 14 June 1932 Rockdale, New South Wales, Australia
- Died: 25 June 2015 (aged 83) Greenwich, New South Wales, Australia

Playing information
- Position: Centre
Club
Years	Team	Pld	T	G	FG	P
1954–61	St. George	64	30	0	0	90
1962–63	Parramatta	24	7	0	0	21
	Total	88	37	0	0	111

Geoffrey Alan Weekes (14 June 1932 – 25 June 2015) was an Australian rugby league footballer who played in the 1950s and 1960s. He was a two-time premiership winner with the St George Dragons.

== Career ==
A local Rockdale junior, Weekes went on to play eight seasons of first grade with the St George Dragons between 1954-1961 and was a prolific try scorer during those years. He won two premierships with Dragons, playing in both the 1958 Grand Final and the 1959 Grand Final.

After losing his regular first grade spot to the young and talented Reg Gasnier, Weekes joined a number of players that followed Ken Kearney to the Parramatta club and he played two final seasons with them in 1962–1963.

== Death ==
Weekes died on 25 June 2015 at Greenwich Hospital, Sydney aged 83.

Geoff Weekes is the grandfather of former Manly Sea Eagles junior and current (2025) Canberra Raiders fullback Kaeo Weekes.
