= Don Malone =

Australian rugby league footballer (1938-2019)

Personal information
- Full name: Donald John Malone
- Born: 1 June 1938
- Died: 25 October 2019 (aged 81)

Playing information
- Position: Halfback, Wing
Club
Years	Team	Pld	T	G	FG	P
1958–65	Western Suburbs	68	16	0	0	48

Don Malone is an Australian former rugby league footballer who played in the 1950s and 1960s. He played for Western Suburbs as a halfback but began his career as a winger.

== Playing career ==
Malone started his first grade career with Western Suburbs in 1958. In the same year he played on the wing in the 1958 grand final defeat against St George. In 1959, Malone won the reserve grade competition with Wests. Malone missed the 1961 grand final loss against St George but then played in the following two consecutive grand final losses both against St George who at that stage were halfway through their 11-year premiership reign. Malone played a further two seasons for Wests and retired at the end of 1965.
