= Roy Fisher (rugby league) =

Australian rugby league footballer (born 1932)

Personal information
- Full name: Roy Fisher
- Born: 3 March 1932 Sydney, New South Wales, Australia
- Height: 6 ft 2 in (188 cm)

Playing information
- Position: Prop
Club
Years	Team	Pld	T	G	FG	P
1953–62	Parramatta	161	12	0	0	36
1963–65	North Sydney	12	0	0	0	0
	Total	173	12	0	0	36
Representative
Years	Team	Pld	T	G	FG	P
1959	NSW City	1	0	0	0	0

Roy Fisher (born 3 March 1932) is an Australian former rugby league footballer who played in the 1950s and 1960s. He played for Parramatta and North Sydney as a prop.

== Playing career ==
Fisher made his first grade debut for Parramatta in 1953 after having played in Yass as a junior and being recruited by the blue and golds during the preceding off-season. Despite having a long career with Parramatta, Fisher's time at the Eels was not a successful one as the club struggled on the field for many years. This was mainly due to the club fielding a squad mostly made up of park footballers and local amateur players. Other clubs in the 1950s like Balmain, St. George, Wests, Souths, and Newtown were recruiting many top-class players from country New South Wales and increasingly from Queensland.

He collected seven wooden spoons as a player with Parramatta but stayed loyal to the club and made an NSWRFL record 170 consecutive grade appearance. This record was not beaten for almost thirty years until Illawarra hooker Michael Bolt surpassed it in 1990. Fisher’s record of most appearances for the Eels was surpassed by Billy Rayner in the 1964 season. In 1962 Fisher was a made a life member of Parramatta for his contributions to the club. In 1963, Fisher joined North Sydney and played there for three seasons before retiring at the end of 1965.
