= Ron Mack =

Australian rugby league footballer

Playing information
- Position: Wing
Club
Years	Team	Pld	T	G	FG	P
1959–63	Balmain Tigers	78	47	0	0	141

Ron Mack is an Australian former rugby league footballer.

A winger, Mack competed for Balmain from 1959 to 1963, after arriving from Illawarra club Western Suburbs. He had an immediate impact in 1959 with a club high 15 first–grade tries, earning NSW City Seconds selection during the season. Following his time with Balmain, Mack played for Bombala and represented Monaro against the touring Great Britain side in 1966.
