= Darcy Henry =

Australia international rugby league footballer

Personal information
- Full name: Benjamin Darcy Henry
- Born: 8 March 1932 Tamworth, New South Wales
- Died: 27 November 2004 (aged 72) Balgowlah, New South Wales

Playing information
- Position: Five-eighth, Centre
Club
Years	Team	Pld	T	G	FG	P
1951–52	Eastern Suburbs	22	14	0	0	42
1956–59	Western Suburbs	65	37	0	0	111
	Total	87	51	0	0	153
Representative
Years	Team	Pld	T	G	FG	P
1955–56	New South Wales	5	4	0	0	12
1955–56	Australia	2	1	0	0	3
1955	NSW Country	1	0	0	0	0
1956	NSW City	1	1	0	0	3

Darcy Henry (1932–2004) was an Australian rugby league footballer who played in the 1950s.

== Playing career ==
Henry was from Tamworth, New South Wales, and came to Eastern Suburbs as a teenager in 1951. After the 1952 season, Henry moved to play with both Temora and Forbes and represented New South Wales and Australia in 1955 & 1956.

Henry returned to Sydney in 1956 to play with Western Suburbs and played four seasons with them including the 1958 Grand Final. Henry is listed on the Australian Players Register as Kangaroo No. 314.

== Death ==
Henry died on 27 November 2004 at Manly, New South Wales, aged 72.
