= Bede Goff =

Australian rugby league footballer

Personal information
- Full name: William Bede Goff
- Born: 17 June 1928; Sydney, New South Wales, Australia
- Died: 5 November 2000 (aged 72); Wollongong, New South Wales, Australia

Playing information
- Position: Hooker
Club
Years	Team	Pld	T	G	FG	P
1952–60	Western Suburbs	84	11	0	0	33
1961	Balmain	18	0	0	0	0
	Total	102	11	0	0	33
Representative
Years	Team	Pld	T	G	FG	P
1959–60	New South Wales	2	0	0	0	0
1960	NSW City	1	0	0	0	0
- Source: As of 8 May 2019

Bede Goff (1928-2000) was an Australian rugby league footballer who played in the 1950s and 1960s. He played for Western Suburbs and Balmain in the New South Wales Rugby League (NSWRL) competition.

== Playing career ==
Goff made his first grade debut in 1952, the same year that Western Suburbs defeated South Sydney in the grand final to claim their 4th and final premiership. Goff made no appearances for Wests in 1953 or 1954 but returned to the first grade side in 1955. Western Suburbs would go on to finish last in 1955 winning only 3 games for the entire season.

In 1956 and 1957, Western Suburbs finished in 4th place but were eliminated in the finals by Souths on both occasions. In 1958, Western Suburbs finished 2nd on the table just behind minor premiers St George. In the first week of the finals, Wests shocked St George defeating them 34-10 with Goff playing at hooker in the game. Western Suburbs would then go on to reach the 1958 grand final against St George. Goff played at hooker in the final as St George took a 10-5 lead into halftime. In the second half, St George held off Wests to win their 3rd straight premiership 20-9.

The following season in 1959, Wests finished 2nd on the table and were looking to reach another grand final against St George. Wests fell short of the final as they were upset by Manly-Warringah 14-13. In his final year at Western Suburbs, the club reached another preliminary final but were defeated by Eastern Suburbs 20-15. The loss was Goff's last game for the team and he departed at seasons end to join Balmain.

In Goff's one season at Balmain, the club finished 3rd on the table and reached the preliminary final. Balmain's opponents in the preliminary final were ironically Goff's former club Western Suburbs. In a close game, Balmain lost 7-5. This would be Goff's final game as a player and he retired at the end of the 1961 season.

At representative level, Goff played 2 games for New South Wales against Queensland and 1 game for New South Wales City.
