= Jack Bowman (rugby league) =

Australian rugby league footballer (1930–2007)

Personal information
- Full name: John Harold Bowman
- Born: 30 August 1930 Mayfield, New South Wales, Australia
- Died: 12 November 2007 (aged 77)

Playing information
- Position: Second-row, Lock
Club
| Years | Team | Pld | T | G | FG | P |
|---|---|---|---|---|---|---|
| 1955–56 | Canterbury-Bankstown | 32 | 6 | 0 | 0 | 18 |
| 1958–59 | Western Suburbs | 32 | 5 | 0 | 0 | 15 |
| | Total | 64 | 11 | 0 | 0 | 33 |
Representative
| Years | Team | Pld | T | G | FG | P |
| 1955 | New South Wales | 1 | 0 | 0 | 0 | 0 |
| 1957 | NSW Country | 1 | 0 | 0 | 0 | 0 |
- Source: As of 8 May 2019

Jack Bowman nicknamed "Buddy" was an Australian rugby league footballer who played in the 1950s. He played for Western Suburbs and Canterbury-Bankstown in the New South Wales Rugby League (NSWRL) competition.

== Playing career ==
Bowman made his first grade debut for Canterbury against Western Suburbs in 1955. Canterbury would go on to finish second last in 1955 just above last placed Wests. Despite the club finishing near the bottom of the table, Bowman was selected to play for New South Wales in 1 game against Queensland. The following year, Bowman played 16 games and scored 5 tries as Canterbury finished 7th. Bowman then departed the club and spent a year in Griffith. Bowman was selected to play for NSW Country against NSW City in 1957. Bowman then returned to Sydney and signed with Western Suburbs.

In 1958, Western Suburbs finished 2nd on the table just behind minor premiers St George. In the first week of the finals, Wests shocked St George defeating them 34-10 with Bowman playing at second-row in the game. Western Suburbs would then go on to reach the 1958 grand final against St George. Bowman played at second-row in the final as St George took a 10-5 lead into halftime. In the second half, St George held off Wests to win their 3rd straight premiership 20-9.

The following season in 1959, Wests finished 2nd on the table. Bowman played in the first week of the finals against St George which Wests lost 35-25 at the Sydney Cricket Ground with Bowman scoring a try. The loss was Bowman's last game for the club as he missed out on playing in the club's preliminary final defeat against Manly-Warringah.
