= Jim Peebles (rugby league) =

Australian rugby league footballer

Personal information
- Full name: James Ivan Peebles
- Born: 29 April 1931; Queenscliff, New South Wales, Australia
- Died: 9 February 2013 (aged 81)

Playing information
- Position: Lock
Club
Years	Team	Pld	T	G	FG	P
1953–61	Manly-Warringah	45	9	0	0	27
- Source: Whiticker/Hudson

Jim Peebles (1931–2013) was an Australian rugby league footballer who played in the 1950s and 1960s.

== Playing career ==
Peebles was a local Manly-Warringah player from Queenscliff, New South Wales. Graded at Manly in 1953, he played five seasons of first grade with Manly between 1953 and 1961. Peebles played lock in the 1959 Grand Final with great Manly players such as Rex Mossop, Roy Bull and Ron Willey. He retired in 1962.

== Death ==
Peebles died on 9 February 2013, aged 81.
