= Alf Madden =

Australian rugby league footballer

Personal information
- Full name: Alfred Alexander Madden

Playing information
- Position: Five-eighth
Club
| Years | Team | Pld | T | G | FG | P |
|---|---|---|---|---|---|---|
| 1955–56 | North Sydney | 22 | 2 | 9 | 0 | 24 |
| 1958–59 | Manly-Warringah | 18 | 3 | 1 | 0 | 11 |
| | Total | 40 | 5 | 10 | 0 | 35 |
- Source: As of 3 April 2019

Alf Madden was an Australian professional rugby league footballer who played in 1950s. He played for Manly-Warringah and North Sydney in the New South Wales Rugby League (NSWRL) competition.

== Playing career ==
Madden made his first grade debut for North Sydney in 1955 and played 2 seasons with the club before leaving at the end of 1956. Due to the residency rules at the time, Madden was not eligible to play for Manly so he was forced to sit out the 1957 season before moving to the Manly district.

In 1959, Manly reached their third grand final against St. George. Madden played at five-eighth in the grand final as St George kept Manly scoreless, winning their 4th straight premiership 20–0. This would prove to be Madden's last game for Manly, and he retired following the grand final defeat.
