= Darcy Russell =

Australian rugby league footballer

Personal information
- Full name: Darcy James Russell
- Born: 13 April 1929 (age 95); Sydney, New South Wales, Australia

Playing information
- Position: Fullback
Club
| Years | Team | Pld | T | G | FG | P |
|---|---|---|---|---|---|---|
| 1948–51 | Eastern Suburbs | 46 | 3 | 136 | 0 | 281 |
| 1957–60 | Western Suburbs | 79 | 16 | 357 | 1 | 764 |
| | Total | 125 | 19 | 493 | 1 | 1045 |
- Source: Whiticker/Hudson
- Relatives: Barry Russell (brother)

Darcy Russell was a rugby league footballer in the NSWRFL and was a prolific goal kicker and point-scorer.

== Club career ==
He played in the New South Wales Rugby Football League premiership for the Eastern Suburbs for 4 seasons between 1948-1951 and the Western Suburbs for 4 seasons between 1957 and 1960.

He played in the Wollongong competition between 1952 and 1956, and was selected for N.S.W. Country in 1953 and kicked 8 goals in the match.

== Point scoring records ==
In the 1947 season Russell topped the point scoring lists for Easts in 1st grade and 3rd grade.

Darcy Russell was the leading pointscorer in the NSWRFL in 1957, 1959 and 1960.

He retired after the 1960 season, aged 38. His brother, Barry Russell also played for Easts in the 1950s.
