= 1938 Auckland Rugby League season =

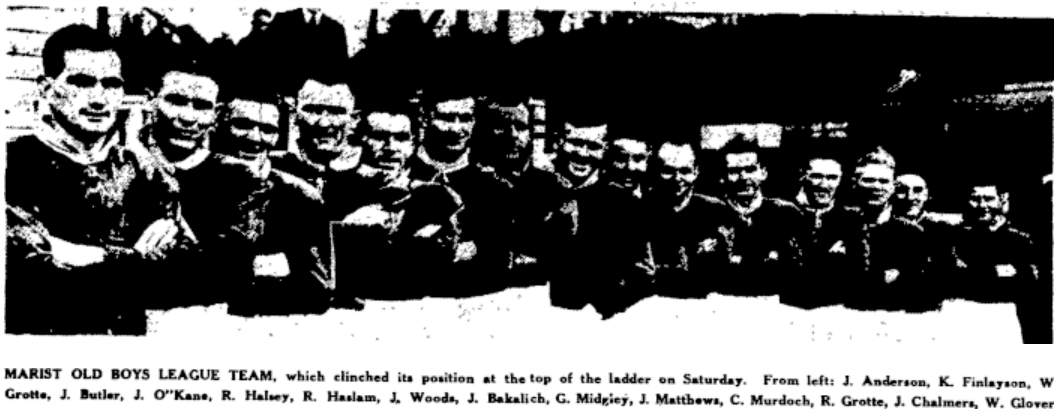
The Marist Old Boys Fox Memorial Shield championship winners for 1938.

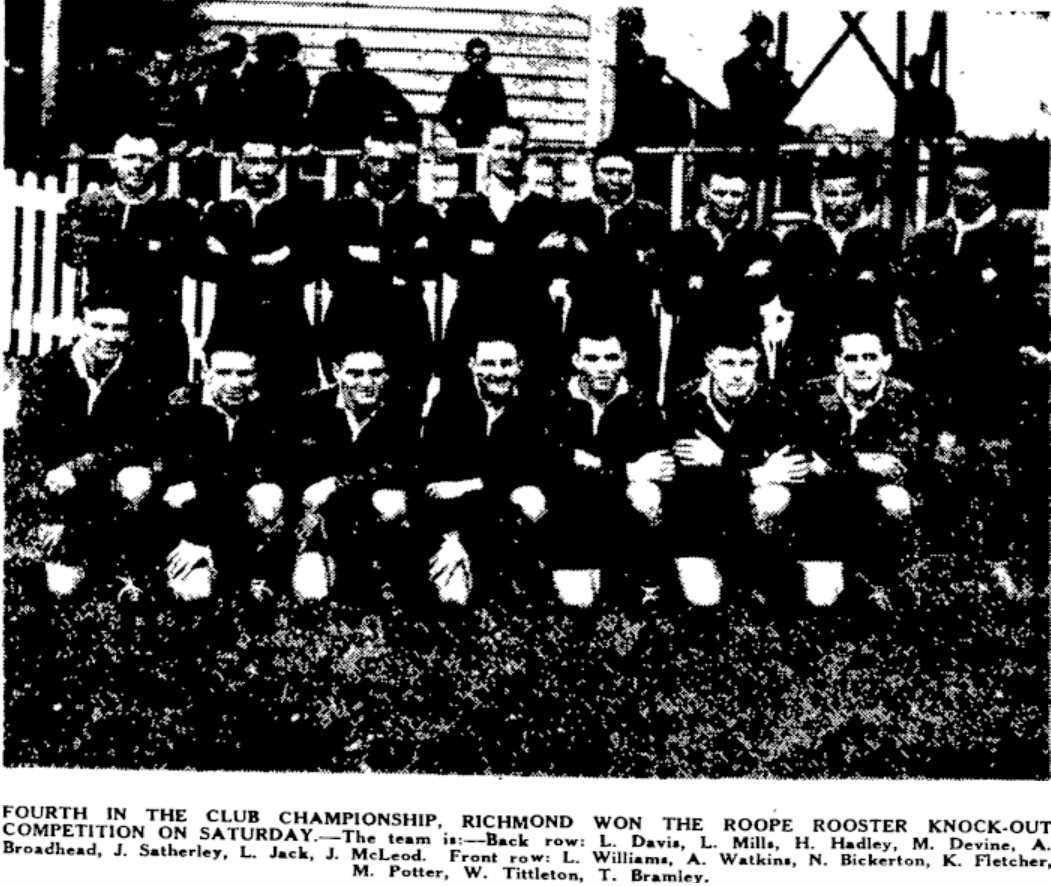
The Richmond Rovers team which won the Roope Rooster knockout competition on September 17 beating City Rovers 20-8.

The 1938 Auckland Rugby League season was its 30th. Marist Old Boys won their 3rd first grade title with their previous coming in 1924 and 1931.

Richmond Rovers won the Roope Rooster for the 5th time when they beat City Rovers 20–8 in the final. City had not won a trophy since 1925 but had been boosted mid season by the addition of Bob Banham who the Auckland Rugby League had brought over from Australia as a player coach. Richmond also won the Stormont Shield for the fourth time when they defeated Marist Old Boys 9–8. Eastern Suburbs (NSWRL runner up) toured at the end of the season and Richmond were the only team to beat them when they won 11–9. Eastern Suburbs beat Marist (36–15), Manukau (16–7) and a South Auckland (Waikato) team (17–5).

Manukau, who were coached by former Kiwi Bert Laing won the Phelan Shield for the first time after they beat Papakura18-8 in the final. The Phelan Shield at this time was played for by the teams which had been knocked out of the Roope Rooster. Richmond Rovers won the reserve grade competition (Norton Cup) after they were tied with Mount Albert United after the final round and a final was necessary to decide the champion. Richmond won the match 16–10. They also won the Stallard Cup when they won the reserve grade knockout competition beating Marist 18–7 in the final. The Senior B competition (Sharman Cup) was comfortably won by Otahuhu Rovers who finished five competition points ahead of Green Lane. Ellerslie United won the Walmesley Shield which was the senior B knockout competition although this season it was played over two full rounds.

Claude Dempsey, the Newton fullback, and former NZ international player was awarded the J.F.W. Dickson's medal for being the most sportsmanlike player in the senior grade. Junior awards went to J. Means and J. McWilliams.

The representative season saw Auckland play three matches. They defeated a Rest of the North Island side easily by 67 points to 14. They then beat the returning New Zealand team which had toured Australia by 21 points to 13. Then in August they defeated Canterbury 28–22 at Carlaw Park. The North Island team which beat the South Island was dominated by Auckland players with only Joe Cootes (Wellington) being from outside Auckland. They thrashed the South Island 55 points to 2. Unsurprisingly 18 of the New Zealand team selected to tour Australia were Auckland players. The Auckland Māori team played just one match which was against an Auckland Pākehā side and ran out 26 to 21 winners.

Preceded by 1937	30th Auckland Rugby League season 1938	Succeeded by 1939

== Auckland Rugby League meeting and news ==
=== Club teams by grade participation ===
There were 104 club teams across 10 grades in the 1938 season.

Team	Fox Memorial	Reserves	Senior B	3rd	4th	5th	6th	7th	Schoolboys	Total
Richmond Rovers	1	1	0	1	1	1	1	1	3	10
Mount Albert United	1	1	0	1	1	1	0	0	3	7
Ponsonby United	1	1	0	1	0	0	1	0	3	7
North Shore Albions	1	1	0	1	1	1	0	1	1	7
Ellerslie United	0	0	1	1	1	1	0	1	2	7
Point Chevalier	0	0	1	1	0	1	0	1	3	7
Newton Rangers	1	1	0	0	0	0	1	0	3	6
City Rovers	1	1	0	1	1	1	0	1	0	6
Papakura	1	1	0	1	1	1	0	1	0	6
Manukau	1	1	0	1	1	0	0	1	1	6
Northcote & Birkenhead Ramblers	0	0	1	1	1	1	0	0	2	6
Otahuhu Rovers	0	0	1	1	1	0	1	0	1	5
Green Lane	0	0	1	0	0	1	1	0	2	5
Glenora	0	0	0	1	1	0	0	1	2	5
Avondale	0	0	0	1	0	0	1	0	3	5
Marist Old Boys	1	1	0	1	0	0	1	0	0	4
R.V.	0	0	1	1	1	0	0	0	0	3
St Patricks School	0	0	0	0	0	0	0	0	3	3
George Courts (business)	0	0	0	0	0	0	0	0	2	2
Balmoral School	0	0	0	0	0	0	0	0	2	2
Napier Street School*	0	0	0	0	0	0	0	0	1	1
Total	9	9	6	15	11	9	7	8	36	110

- Napier Street School is now known as Freemans Bay School (Ponsonby).

=== Preliminary meeting ===
At a meeting on February 17 the Auckland Rugby League decided to start the senior competition at the early date on April 2 due to the tour of New Zealand to Australia during the season. The date for the annual meeting was set at March 23. At the conclusion of the meeting they inspected the new lighting which has been installed at Carlaw Park in order to accommodate night football.

=== Annual general meeting ===
The report which was to be presented at the annual general meeting showed that the balance sheet for the Auckland Rugby League was £3605s at the end of the 1937 season which was an increase of £21 on the previous season. There was an excess of assets over liabilities of £7598 12s 9d. At the annual meeting on March 23 Mr. John A. Lee presided as president. He said "last year the code made great progress... and we are opening the greatest season we have ever had. Co-operation and good spirit shown by players and officials was to a large degree responsible for this success... after years of difficulty last year we reached the strength to warrant a team being sent and tested on the playing fields of Australia... great responsibility rests with the officials to see that a fine team be sent this season". He went on to declare "that league was a democratic code. No class distinction could enter if the game was to progress. He paid tribute to the great work of the ladies’ committees, whose social activities during the year did much to aid the code". Mr. G. Grey Campbell, chairman of the control board, said "it was pleasing to note that there had been no incidents at Carlaw Park last year, and not a single senior player had come before the board for irregular conduct on the field. During the summer improvements had been made at Carlaw Park, and the system of flood lighting, which was so successful for sports events, would make night football possible". Tribute was paid to Ivan Culpan who had been secretary for the league for 20 years. During the meeting Archie Ferguson appealed for more senior matches to be played on outside grounds, particularly at the Devonport Domain with Mr. Campbell saying that the matter would be considered. Along with John A. Lee, four other members of parliament were also present, including Messrs, William Theophilus Anderton, Frederick William Schramm, Arthur George Osborne, and Arthur Shapton Richards who all "spoke of the success of the code in Auckland". The following officers were elected:- Patron, Mr. J.B. Donald; vice-patron, Mr. J.F.W. Dickson; president, Mr. John A. Lee, M.P.; vice presidents, Sir Ernest Davis, Messrs. R.D. Bagnall, R. Benson, J Donald, O. Blackwood, T.S. Bellamy, C. Drysdale, H. Grange, R.J. Laird, W.J. Lovett, E. Morton, E. Montgomery, T.G. Symonds, Joe Sayegh, C. Seagar, Frederick William Schramm M.P., W. Wallace, H. Walmsley, R.H. Wood, G.T. Wright, W.H. Brien, L. Coakley, H. Luke; trustees, Messrs. A. Stormont, Edward John Phelan, G. Grey Campbell; deputy-chairman, Edward John Phelan; club delegates, Messrs, F. McAneny, T. Davis, J.W. Probert, Jim Rukutai; chairman junior control board, Mr. D. Wilkie; auditor, Mr. R.A. Spinley; honorary physicians, Drs. M.G. Pezaro, F.J. Gwynne, K.H. Holdgate, J.N. Waddell, G.W. Lock, H. Burrell, W. Bridgman, S. Morris; board of control, Messrs. G. Grey Campbell (chairman), D. Wilkie, R. Doble, T. Davis, J.W. Probert, Jim Rukutai, J. McAneny, J.E. Knowling, and Ivan Culpan.

=== Annual ball ===
The Auckland Rugby League held their annual ball at the Peter Pan Cabaret on September 28. The Eastern Suburbs team which was touring Auckland at the time were honorary guests.

=== Auckland Rugby League life memberships ===
==== Jim Clark ====
Otahuhu nominated Jim Clark, who had recently been elected as returning president of their club as a life member of Auckland Rugby League. The league agreed and he was elected a life member of the ARL. It was stated that he "had been actively identified with the game for 25 years and had given much service as an official in the Otahuhu district for some years past. It was mentioned that Mr. Clark was an international, having twice played with New Zealand teams in Australia".

==== Frank Thompson ====
At the board of control meeting on June 22 Frank Thompson was made a life member. He joined the code in 1913 through the Remuera club. Thompson was an ex-member of the Referees’ Association for 17 years and spent 5 years on the grading, examination and appointment board. He also spent four years as a selector and six years with the junior management. Thompson was also a member of the New Zealand Referees’ Association for 10 years as a representative of the Auckland and the Northland leagues. He was also heavily involved in the acquisition and formation of Carlaw Park.

=== Rugby league ground allocation ===
On April 14 the Auckland Park and Reserves Committee met to allocate fields to the various winter codes. The chairman of the committee was Ted Phelan who was also on the Auckland Rugby League board. The fields allocated to rugby league were Cricket Ground (2), Outer Domain (1), Victoria Park (1), Walker Park (2), Western Springs (2), Grey Lynn Park (1), with ‘Stadium’ reserved. It was commented that there was a "spirit of harmony" between the codes.

=== George Gillett donated trophy ===
In June, former All Black and NZ rugby league international George Gillett, donated a "handsome silver cup to the Auckland Rugby League for any competition which the league may desire. The trophy was presented through Mr. H. Walmsley". It was decided during the season to award the trophy to the winner of the 4th grade competition which was ultimately City Rovers.

=== Papakura promoted to the Fox Memorial competition ===
At the annual meeting on March 23 it was announced that Papakura were being promoted from the Senior B grade which they had won comfortably for 2 consecutive seasons to the Fox Memorial competition. Their backs would include Richard and A. Burgess, E Cossey, G Osborne, Phillips, J McInnes and Martin though it was said that their "strength will probably be in the forwards". While J Fogarty, D Evans, Buckeridge, C Ross, and Slater made a "good impression" in their preliminary match against Marist. It was rumoured that Cliff Satherley may also play for them. He didn't though former New Zealand representative Norm Campbell did play a handful of games to begin the season.

=== George Nēpia joins Manukau ===
On March 10 it was reported that George Nepia would join the Manukau club. He would arrive in Onehunga later in March and would be accompanied by Tuhoro, who was "last year's outstanding forward for East Coast and Hawke's Bay". The Manukau team would be extremely strong with the selectors saying that their senior side would be selected from George Nepia, Jack Hemi, Rangi Chase, Angus Gault, Jack Brodrick, Walter Brimble, Tommy Chase, Pita Ririnui, Jack Broughton, R. Wilson, McKinlay, Peter Mahima, Jack Whye, Tuhoro (2), Kakau, Tane, and Phillips. It was then reported in late March that there were doubts that he would in fact play for Manukau however he ultimately did for a few weeks.

=== Senior team preseason and prospects ===
On March 26 several teams held organised practices with the Manukau side playing a South Auckland XIII at Waikaraka Park. Newton, Marist, City, and Ponsonby all practised at Carlaw Park while Richmond were at Grey Lynn Park. It was reported that Ponsonby were to be coached by Bill Davidson who was a past City Rovers player who also represented Auckland 14 times from 1920 to 1923 and New Zealand 16 times from 1919 to 1921.

It was reported that Richmond Rovers had erected a dressing and club rooms at Grey Lynn Park and that the senior team would be a strong one with Mervyn Devine joining the forwards. He was a Wellington Rugby representative. However Ted Mincham was transferring from Richmond to Mount Albert. They would still have the services of "Powell, Bickerton, and Wally Tittleton for their inside backs who know when others play well and Wally Tittleton is particularly clever at taking the gap and improving a movement for the men outside him. The form showed [after the preliminary games] by Mills and Abbie Graham, two of the juniors can earn them permanent places in the senior team, [while] Furnell was the most improved full back in Auckland last season".

The Manukau side was considered to be shaping as "a very formidable team" with the "forwards particularly strong, and perhaps the heaviest ever seen in club football. The average weight will be nearly 14 stone. This should be a great season for Jack Brodrick, whose brilliant form in the Māori match against Australia last year, stamps him as the finest forward seen in the code for many years". They were also adding Pita Ririnui and "he should soon rise to All Black honours" according to the Auckland Star reporter. After their first preliminary game (which he did not play in) it was reported that Jack Hemi "expressed a desire to play for Ponsonby, but the transfer might cause some difficulty". After the match the Auckland Star said that Ririnui "made a good impression on his first appearance and Brodrick, the best forward in Auckland last year, appears to be already in good form". Mahika Panapa, the North Auckland Rugby Maori representative halfback signed on to play for Manukau prior to their first Fox Memorial game. In mid May, J. Craig, a representative rugby player from Nelson arrived in Auckland to join the Manukau club. He had represented the combined Nelson-Golden Bay-Motueka-Marlborough side who played the Springboks in 1937.

Marist were reportedly gaining the services of Robert Grotte, a former member and halfback for the St. George club in Sydney. After the first preliminary game, they were said to be part of The Strongest, being a pivotal player in Auckland, Hasley, and Anderson.

Ponsonby would have a similar team to the previous season with a strong backline and the forwards strengthened by J. Fraser from Taranaki who was said to be a "splendid place-kick". They had virtually the same backline as in the previous season and had gained the services of Clark who was a "young player from Ellerslie [who had] the making of a good fullback.

Mount Albert were a suggested location for Bob Banham as they needed a "link between the rugged Mount Albert forwards and the inside backs, where the weakness lay last season". Ted Mincham joined Mount Albert from Richmond and "with McNeil and McCallum outside him the Mount Albert three-quarter line should be a bit of a problem for their opponents... [while] their forwards appear to be just as strong as last season". They were to be coached by former New Zealand player Stan Prentice. Following the first preliminary round of games at Carlaw Park on April 2 it was said that they "have a good solid pack of forwards and have an exceptional back in R. Burgess who has great dash and pace [and that they] will further strengthen their team for the competition matches. It is probable that they will gain Lilburn, a good five eighths from Hunua. McRobbie, the Pokeno forward, while there is a possibility that Cliff Satherley, the former Richmond and Mount Albert forward will lead the pack. In mid May it was reported that Mount Albert had signed R.F. Ball who was a member of the Eastern Suburbs club in Sydney.

Newton had had a relatively poor 1937 season though they had improved as the season went on. They had retained the services of Wilfred Brimble and Ted Brimble, and Crooks. While "Kendall, a full back from North Auckland showed promise", they also had a "fairly good pack of forwards who stuck to their work well in the preliminary match".

City were said after the first preliminary game to "not appear to be exceptionally strong, and they will miss both Hawea Mataira and Donald, who were their best forwards last year. However, Hutchinson's form at the base of the scrum is excellent, Cyril Wiberg can be relied upon to gather points consistently with accurate goal kicking and the forwards may shake down into a solid combination".

North Shore were said to have a young team. With "much interest taken in the appearance of Verdun Scott, whose cricket deeds are so well known. Scott played full back last season and is also a promising centre three-quarter". Jack Smith who made a good impression at five eighths, is again available. Zane and Rhodes, of last years team, will also be playing. The forwards will include Simpson, Souter, Hunt and players from lower grades.

=== Sprigs ===
It was decided to appoint a special committee to inspect players boots on Saturday's after St John Ambulance staff complained about injuries received by two players as the result of dangerous sprigs following the April 2 matches. The committee to inspect the boots each Saturday would be made up of Messrs. Mincham, Probert, and McAneny.

=== Injury substitutions ===
At the June 8 meeting of the control board the Referees’ Association said that they would "appreciate a ruling in regard to replacements". There was a suspicion that "a certain club had a player who came late, but another player conveniently "became injured" to allow the late player to enter play". While at a different game a player left the field stating he had influenza, while other cases where players had gone "off without advising the referee". Mr Campbell agreed that if a player was not seriously injured then they or the team captain should report to the referee before a replacement can be made. And that "a referee would be entitled to hold a game up to get a report from an ambulance man or doctor if there was ground for believing that injury was being shammed". It was then decided that a committee consisting of the chairman and Messrs. D. Wilkie and W. Mincham would submit a recommendation.

=== Junior football changes ===
At a meeting of the junior management board on February 8 several suggestions were discussed in regards to changes that could be made for the 1938 season. The main changes suggested were a proposal to reduce the age limit for the 6th grade to 18 years, introducing an age limit of 19.5 years for the 5th grade, and starting an open grade for the "first juniors, with a weight limit of 11st 7lb [73 kg], to obviate the need for two sections in the third grade". At their annual meeting on March 8 the proposals were debated and it was eventually decided to adopt them. Additional ones included that the age limit for the 6th grade be 18 and for the 7th grade be 16. The season would start for juniors on April 30.

=== Richmond club rooms opened at Grey Lynn Park ===
Richmond opening of their new clubrooms at Grey Lynn Park in 1938

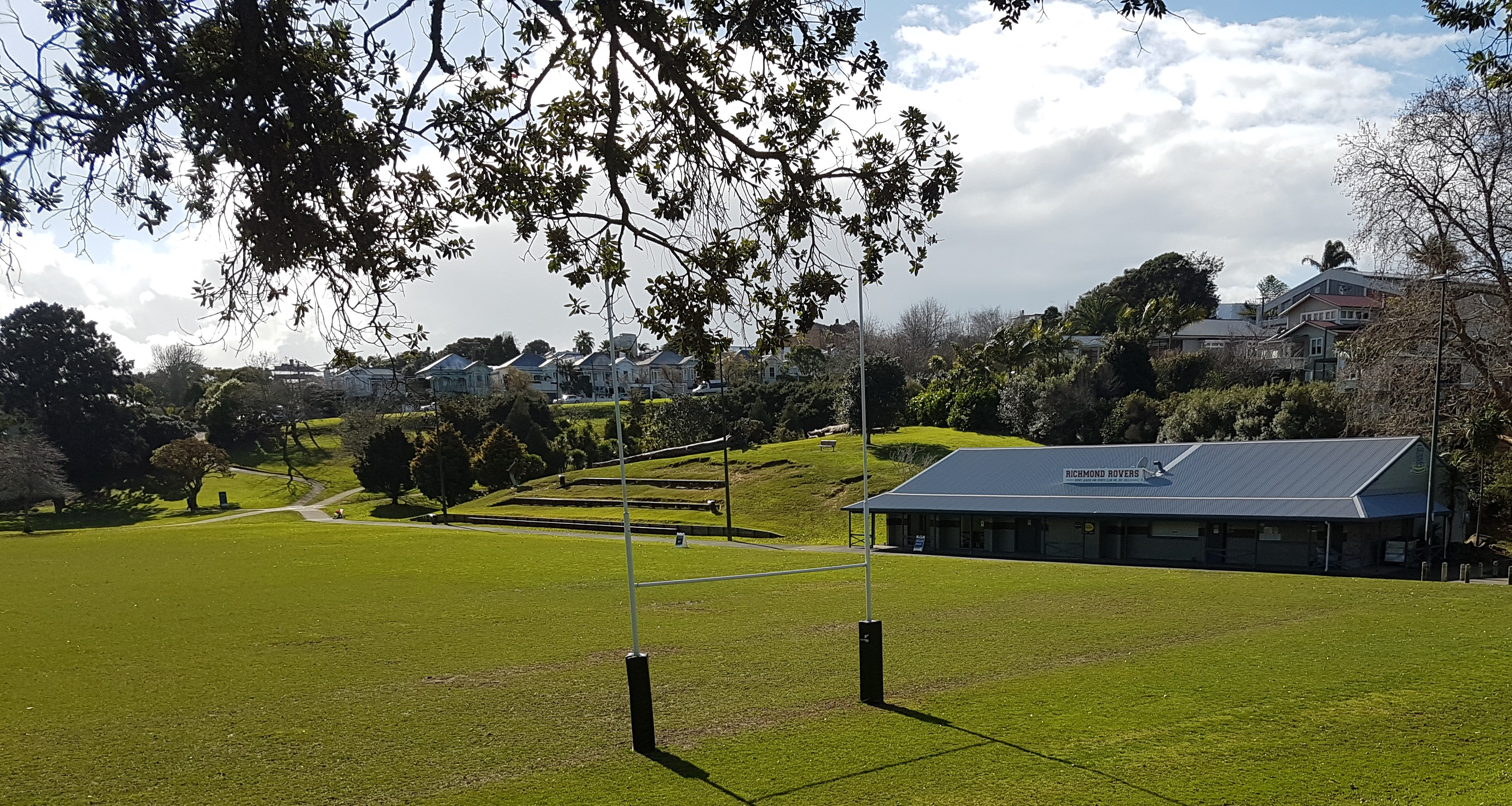
The modern day Richmond Rovers RL club rooms in the same location as the original 1938 club rooms.

In early May the Richmond club applied to celebrate the opening of their clubrooms at Grey Lynn Park on June 4 by holding a match with a Combined Huntly District side on its bye date. On June 4 they were officially opened by Mr. J.A. Lee prior to the game. Lee said "this is going to be a permanent home, and it is an object worthy of the highest praise". While Joe Sayegh said that the Richmond club had "done yeoman service in the interests of the players. He was pleased to say that the City Council was only too pleased to encourage similar buildings on other public properties". Mr. Swift expressed the club's thanks to Mr. Ralph Jenkinson who supervised the building construction.

4 June	Richmond	11-23	Combined Huntly District	Grey Lynn Park
3:00	Try: Maurice Metcalfe; Con: Frank Furnell; Pen: Frank Furnell 3		Try: Turner 2, George Beadle, Moyes, Gunn; Con: Moyes, Shaw 2 Pen: Shaw

=== Lawson Park developed ===
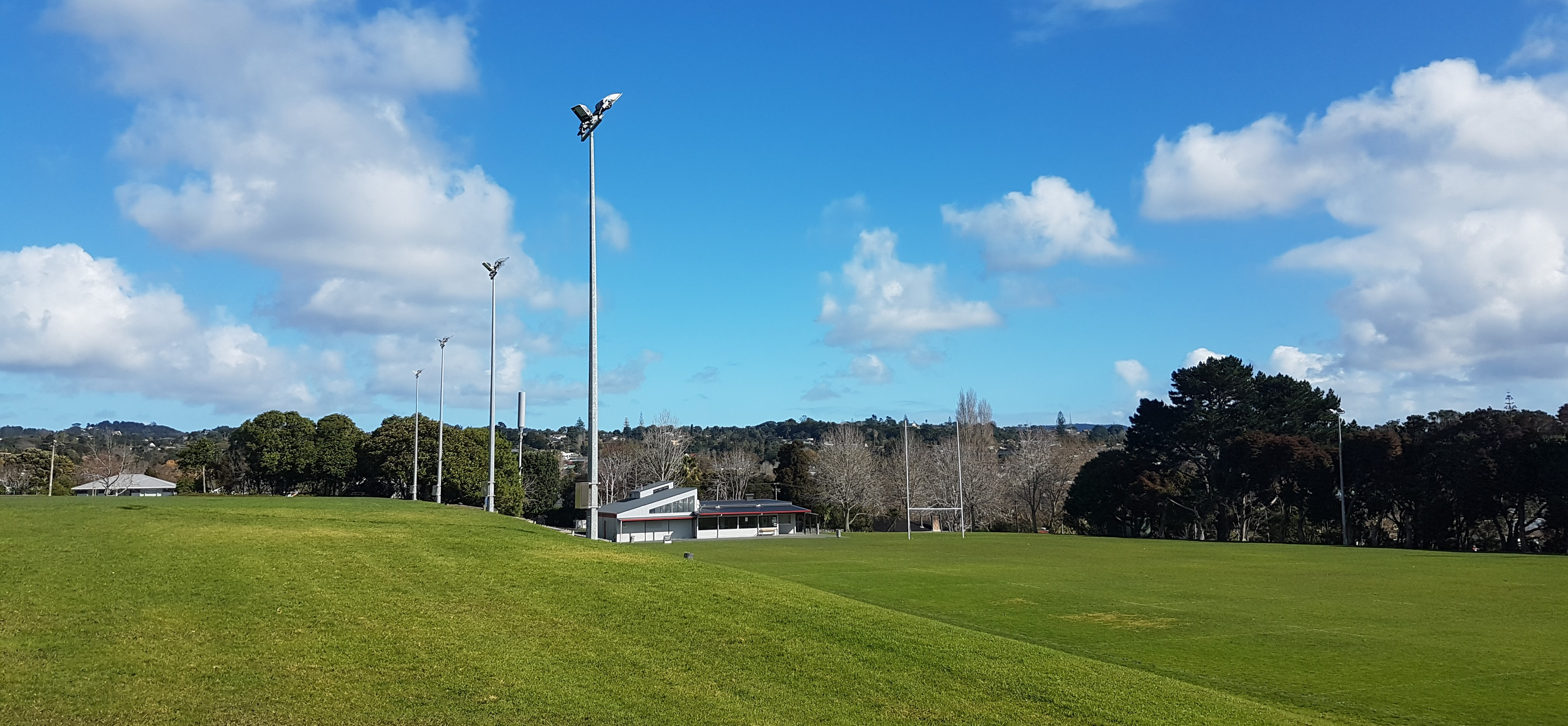
Lawson Park in July 2021. The upper and lower fields with the 'grandstand' bank. In the background is the New Lynn RL club rooms.

It was announced in mid March that Lawson Park would be developed. It would involve "earthworks of which will take from four to five months to complete. After this stage both areas have to be grassed and other finishing touches added". It had been started four years earlier "as a means of creating work in the district for the local unemployed, but was halted when sustenance was introduced. Some months ago work was recommenced, giving work for 20 men. When it is finished, it will provide two basketball [better known as netball at this time] and two tennis courts on a higher level, and on the lower part a rugby or rugby league football ground". It was said that "to provide for the football ground, a good deal of excavation will be necessary, so that ultimately a fine, natural grandstand will be secured". Twenty nine years later, in 1967 the New Lynn Rugby League club was established and Lawson Park became its home ground with their club rooms being built there.

=== Auckland representative team ===
In March the Auckland Rugby League board of control offered the Auckland representative coaching position to Bob Banham, the New South Wales representative five-eighths. A cable was received back from him accepting the position and he was expected to arrive in time for the matches on April 8. The board intended to place Banham in a local team "for playing purposes". It was reported that he had been unlucky to miss out on selection in the 1937 Australian team which toured England and he had also turned down an offer to coach Queensland. In early march it was decided to place Banham in the North Shore Albions side for six weeks and then review the placement. After six matches for North shore it was decided to leave him there for 3 more weeks before moving to and coaching the City team. Bert Avery, Hec Brisbane, and A Renwick were appointed selectors for Auckland for the season while Brisbane was nominated by Auckland to be one of the three selectors for the North Island side.

=== Obituary ===
==== George Seagar (snr) ====
In August George Seagar died aged 73. He had two sons who both represented New Zealand, George Seagar and Allan Seagar. George senior was a strong supporter of rugby league and was an original vice-president of the Auckland Rugby League. He was later made a life member in recognition of his services to the game. He was survived by a wife, seven sons and three daughters, with 25 grandchildren and one great-grandchild.

=== Eastern Suburbs Tour ===
In September/October the NSWRFL runner up Eastern Suburbs side toured Auckland. They played four matches against Marist Old Boys, Manukau, Richmond Rovers, and South Auckland. Their only loss was in the match against Richmond who had accumulated a remarkable record against touring Australian club teams.

==== Marist v Eastern Suburbs ====
Joseph (Joe) Charles Woods for Marist broke his leg in the second half. He was aged 28 and was taken to Auckland Hospital. Marist was captained by Reginald Haslam. Among the 6 try scorers for Eastern Suburbs, 5 were Australian internationals.

24 September	Marist	15-36 (13-15)	Eastern Suburbs	Carlaw Park 1
3:00	Try: Clive Murdoch, John Anderson, Jimmy Matthews; Con: John Anderson; Pen: John Anderson 2		Try: Fred Robinson, Harry Pierce 2, Jack Arnold, Dick Dunn, Frank Hyde 2, Joe Pearce; Con: Jim Norton 6	Attendance: 9,000; Referee: Frank Thompson

==== Manukau v Eastern Suburbs ====
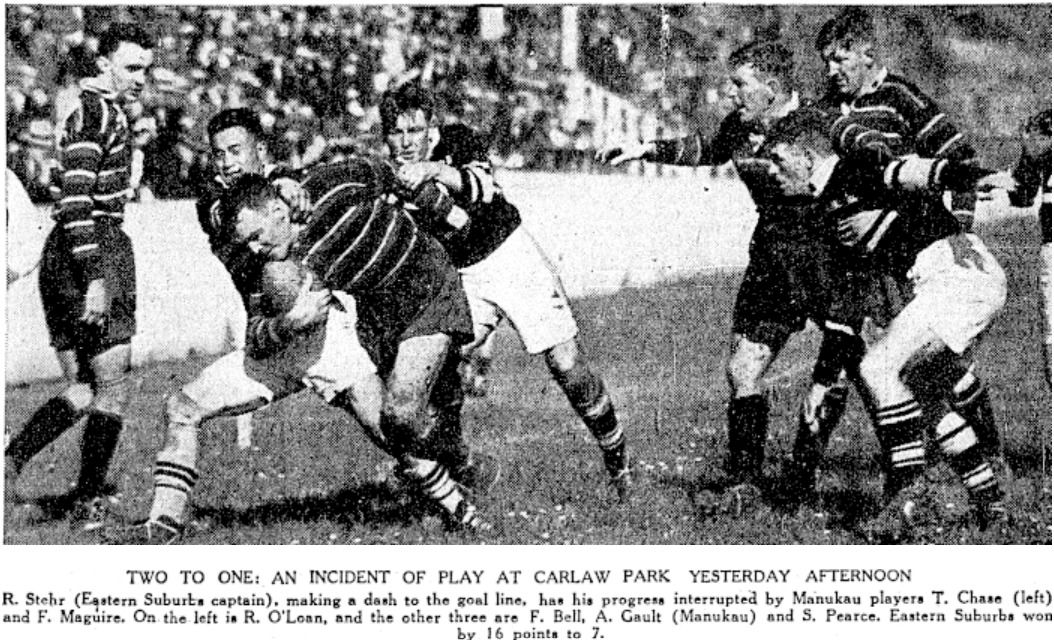
Tommy Chase and Freddie McGuire tackling Ray Stehr

Jack Hemi was unavailable for Manukau due to illness while they lost Jack Brodrick to a shoulder injury during the first half who was replaced by T Ratu.

28 September	Manukau	7-16	Eastern Suburbs	Carlaw Park 1
3:15	Try: Pita Ririnui; Con: Tommy Chase; Pen: Tommy Chase		Try: Dick Dunn 2, Fred Robinson, Harry Pierce; Con: Jim Norton 2	Referee: Stuart Billman

==== Richmond v Eastern Suburbs ====
1 October	Richmond	11-9	Eastern Suburbs	Carlaw Park 1
3:00	Try: Jack Satherley, Alan Watkins, Laurie Mills; Con: Trevor Bramley		Try: Fred Robinson, Rod O’Loan, Frank Hyde	Attendance: 11000; Referee: Maurice Wetherill

==== South Auckland v Eastern Suburbs ====
2 October	South Auckland	5-17 (0-9)	Eastern Suburbs	Davies Park, Huntly
3:00	Try: Unknown		Try: Unknown	Referee: F Knapper

== Senior first grade competitions ==
=== Preliminary round ===
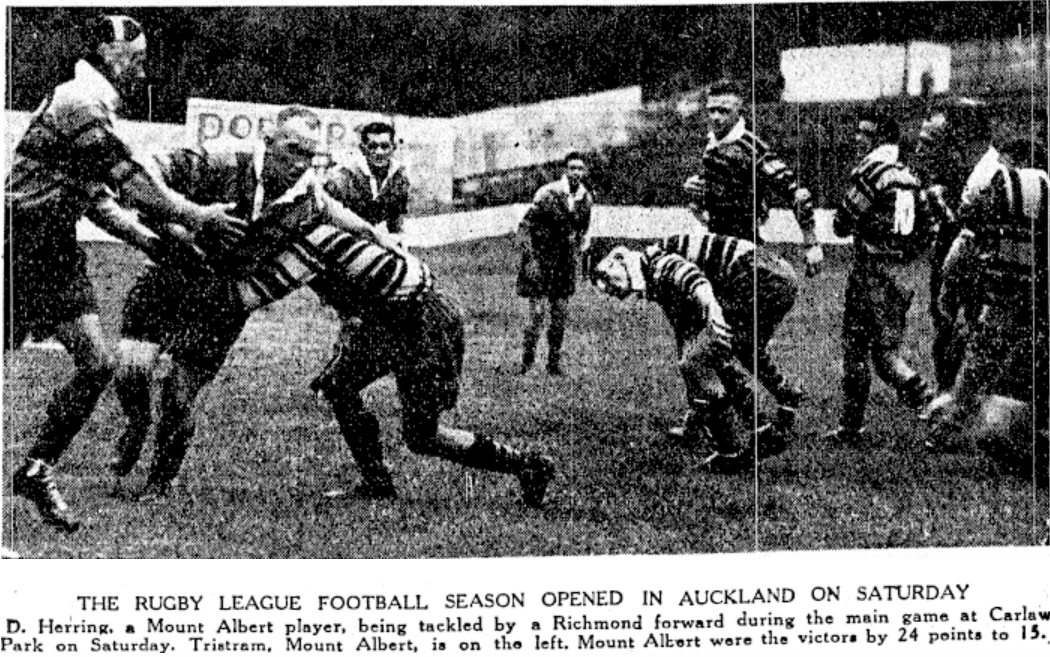
Des Herring (Mount Albert) with the ball with Jack Tristram in support while he is being tackled by a Richmond player.

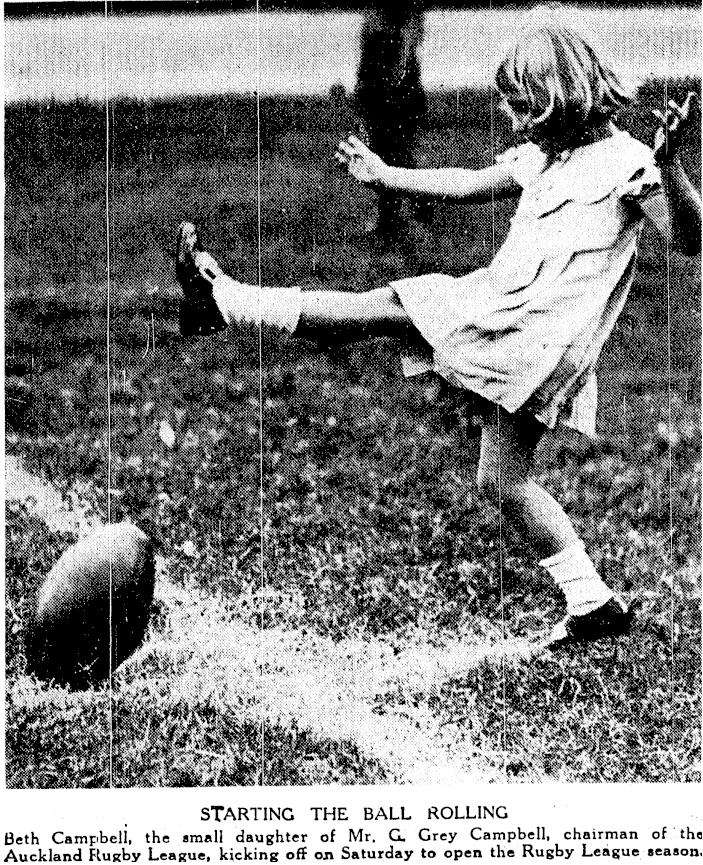
Beth Campbell, daughter of ARL chairman, Mr. G. Grey Campbell kicking off the 1938 season.

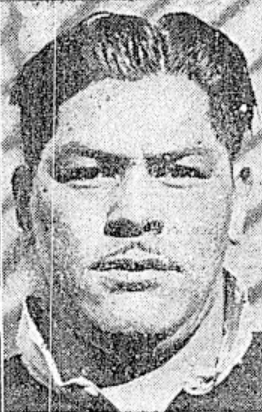
Pita Ririnui, debuted for Manukau.

The preliminary games were played in temperatures that were "practically a summers day". Mervyn William Devine, the former Wellington rugby representative made his debut for the Richmond team on the back of the scrum in their 24–15 loss to Mount Albert and "was one of the best players on the ground". Richmond promoted two junior backs, Abbie Graham and Laurie Mills, who both debuted for Richmond and scored a try each. Mills was a shock selection for New Zealand on their 1939 tour of England but was tragically killed after returning to Europe to fight in World War 2. Graham was selected for New Zealand in 1947. At halftime Mount Albert made several changes with Harry Percy Scott Walker (better known as Bill Walker), a 25 year old Australian coming on at halfback and playing well. Tommy Chase played a brilliant game for Manukau at fullback, He showed tricky running and got his backs going with passing movement many times as well as kicking 4 goals and a "magnificent" drop goal. Manukau fielded two rugby players, Ryan, and Freddie Maguire in the forwards and they both played good games. Pita Ririnui a rugby player from Tauranga who had played for Bay of Plenty and for the combined East Coast-Poverty Bay-Bay of Plenty which played the Springboks at the end of the season played in his second game for Manukau after a practice game the week before. Nel, the South African captain said that he was one of the best forwards they played on the entire tour. He would play for Manukau for several seasons and was selected for New Zealand in 1939. For Ponsonby Pat Young, who had transferred from Newton struggled to combine with Dacre Black who was at halfback. Papakura in their first senior game at the championship level, albeit in a preliminary round fielded a team made up largely of promoted juniors. Robert Burgess played "a dashing game on the wing" for them. Robert Grotte returned to Auckland after having played for three seasons with St. George club, playing 13 games for their top side in that time. Benny Crocker played at halfback with Phil Donovan at first five eighth and Grotte playing in "several positions" during the course of the game for his former club.

2 April	Mount Albert	24-15	Richmond	Carlaw Park 1
3:00	Try: Clarry McNeil 2, William McCallum, Ted Mincham, Bill Walker, Martin Hansen; Con: Ted Mincham 2 Pen: Ted Mincham		Try: George Tittleton, Laurie Mills, Abbie Graham; Pen: Frank Furnell 3	Referee: A Kinnaird

2 April	Manukau	19-11	Ponsonby	Carlaw Park 1
1:30	Try: Ryan, E Kirkwood, Jack Brodrick; Con: Tommy Chase; Pen: Tommy Chase 3 Drop: Tommy Chase		Try: Pat Young, Roy Nurse, Arthur Kay; Pen: Dacre Black	Referee: Owen Chalmers

2 April	Marist	16-15	Papakura	Carlaw Park 2
3:00	Try: John Anderson 2, Gordon Midgley, Reginald Haslam; Con: John Anderson 2		Try: C Ross, Athol Burgess, Dennis Evans; Con: J McInnes 2 Pen: Thomas Kelly	Referee: Ernest Korn

2 April	City	20-16	Newton	Carlaw Park 2
1:30	Try: William McLaughlin, Walsh, Jackie Rata, Joseph Hapi; Con: Douglas Hutchison 3 Pen: Douglas Hutchison		Try: Hill, Jones, Wilfred Brimble, McKenzie; Con: Wilfred Brimble 2	Referee: D Taylor

=== Fox Memorial standings ===
Team	Pld	W	D	L	F	A	Pts
Marist Old Boys	16	12	0	4	254	121	24
Mount Albert United	16	11	0	5	277	205	22
Newton Rangers	16	10	0	6	213	159	20
Manukau	15	9	1	5	226	211	19
Richmond Rovers	15	8	1	6	205	180	17
Ponsonby United	16	8	0	8	176	187	16
North Shore Albions	15	6	0	9	202	221	12
City Rovers	16	3	0	13	184	337	6
Papakura	15	2	0	13	153	279	4

=== Fox Memorial results ===
Marist won the competition when they defeated Newton in the final round. Had they lost there would have been a three-way tie for first with themselves, Mount Albert, and Newton all on 22 points from 11 wins each but their 10–7 win saw them outright winners with 12 wins and 4 losses. A key to their win was their defence which saw them only concede 121 points from 16 games, an average of less than 8 points per game. From round 7 until round 18 their points conceded was 8, 7, 2, 4, 3, 8, 0, 0, 4, 11, and 7.

==== Round 1 ====
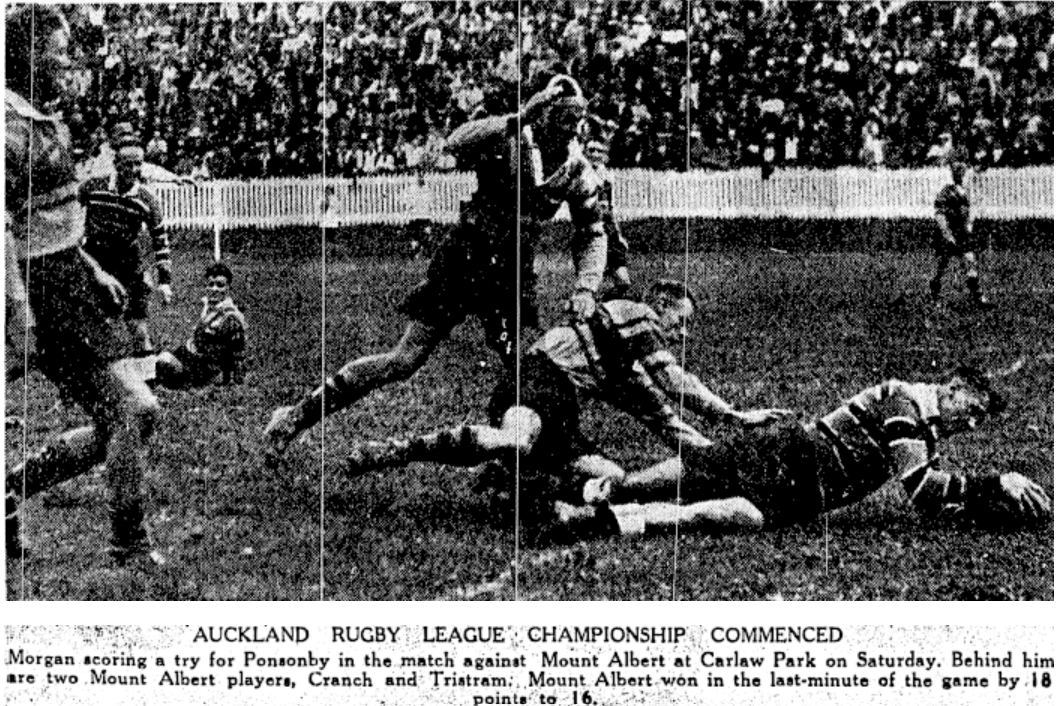
Edgar Morgan scoring for Ponsonby. Full back Basil Cranch (on the ground) and forward Jack Tristram are the Mount Albert players attempting to stop him.

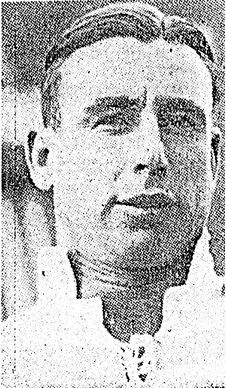
25 year old Bob Banham, the Australian who debuted as temporary player-coach for North Shore. He had spent two seasons with the South Sydney side.

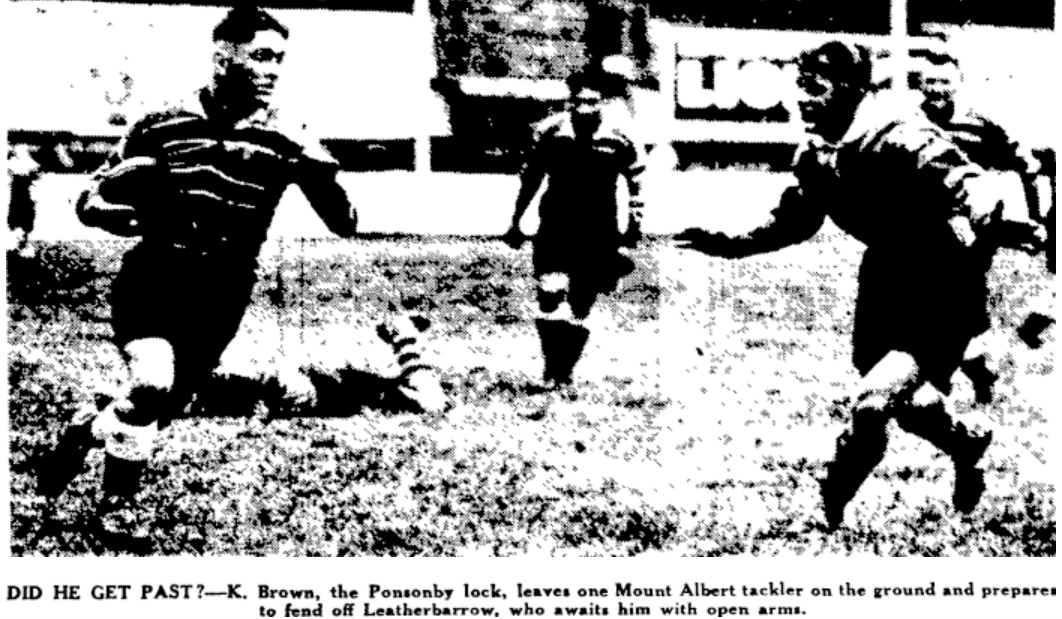
K Brown of Ponsonby with Bert Leatherbarrow coming across to make a tackle.

Around 3,000 spectators were in attendance for the opening round of the championship at Carlaw Park. Papakura played in their first ever Fox Memorial game, losing a close match 17–14 against Richmond on Carlaw Park #2. Their backs struggled against a powerful Richmond back line which featured six current or future New Zealand internationals and tackled too high against Richmond's strong running. Though their forwards matched Richmond's pack for the majority of the game. Former New Zealand player, Norm Campbell debuted for Papakura, though he would only play a handful of matches before retiring from the sport.In the match between Newton and Manukau the referee (Jack Cottingham) was knocked out after a ball which had been kicked by a Newton player attempting to clear their line struck him in the face from point blank range. He recovered after resting in the ambulance room and was able to go home. Percy Rogers, the well known international referee, who was waiting to officiate the following match took over for the last 10 minutes. Wilfred Brimble, the Newton halfback played a good game scoring 11 of their points in their upset 19–8 win over Manukau. Rangi Chase, the start Manukau back was forced to leave the field with a shoulder injury. Mount Albert beat Ponsonby 18–16 with a penalty to Ted Mincham in the closing stages of the game. Arthur Kay, Ponsonby's brilliant centre went off early with injury and was replace by Jack Campbell who played well. Brian Riley, who usually played on the wing was playing at first five eighth for Ponsonby and scored a brilliant try when he side stepped past the opposition and left Mount Albert full back Basil Cranch standing to score. Des Herring in the Mount Albert forwards was outstanding, scoring two tries and his form was described as "right up to international standard". In the other game Marist beat North Shore easily by 23 to 7. Reginald Haslam, the Marist centre had an outstanding game scoring two tries including one from 60 yards out when he dummied the North Shore fullback Verdun Scott to score. Bob Banham, the Australian who had been recruited by Auckland Rugby League as a player coach made his debut at first five eighth for North Shore and made several good openings, "cutting the defence to ribbons" and was well supported by brothers Dick Smith (NZ international in 1932) and Jack Smith (NZ international, 1938–39). Though he was criticised for trying to get low and barge through opponents after making breaks. Ted Scott, now in his eighth season for the North Shore seniors was "a tower of strength", while Horace Hunt also in his eighth season for them also played well.

9 April	Mount Albert	18-16 (10-16)	Ponsonby	Carlaw Park 1
3:00	Try: Des Herring 2, Martin Hansen, Len Schultz; Con: Ted Mincham 2 Pen: Ted Mincham		Try: Brian Riley, Edgar Morgan, Lou Cootes; Con: Pat Young; Drop: Dacre Black	Attendance: 3,000; Referee: Stuart Billman

9 April	Marist	23-7 (12-4)	North Shore	Carlaw Park 1
1:30	Try: Reginald Haslam 2, F McLaren 2, Phil Donovan; Con: John Anderson; Pen: John Anderson 2 Drop: Reginald Haslam		Try: Ivor Stirling; Pen: Jack Smith 2	Attendance: 3,000; Referee: Frank Thompson

9 April	Richmond	17-14 (10-9)	Papakura	Carlaw Park 2
3:00	Try: Wally Tittleton, Jack Satherley, Laurie Mills; Con: Frank Furnell 3 Pen: Frank Furnell		Try: Lyndsay Evans, A Burgess; Con: Thomas Kelly; Pen: Thomas Kelly 2, J McInnes	Attendance: 3,000; Referee: Percy Rogers

9 April	Newton	19-8 (10-5)	Manukau	Carlaw Park 2
1:30	Try: Wilfred Brimble, A Duncan, Alex Nathan; Con: Wilfred Brimble; Pen: Wilfred Brimble 3		Try: Harry Zane-Zaninovich, Tommy Chase; Con: Tommy Chase	Attendance: 3,000; Referee: Jack Cottingham

==== Round 2 ====
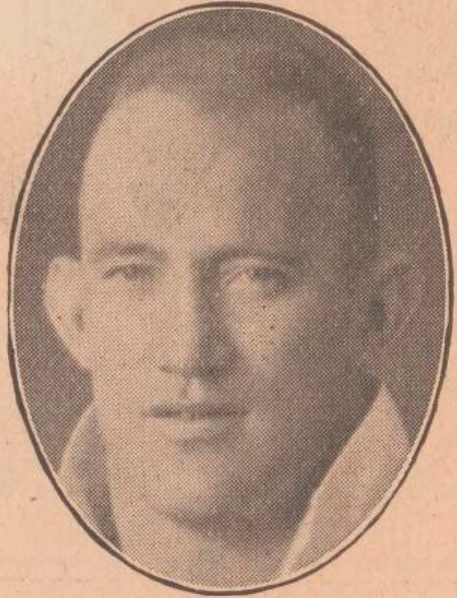
Des Herring, the Mt Albert prop who had an outstanding season.

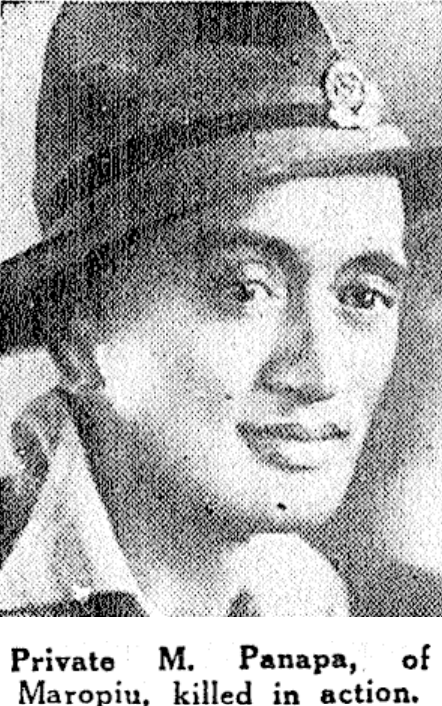
Mihaka Panapa debuted for Manukau. He was part of the Māori Battalion and was killed on December 16, 1941.

In Manukau's 26–21 win over North Shore Jack Hemi made his first appearance of the season and scored a try and kicked four goals. Mihaka Panapa debuted for Manukau after switching codes. He was the 1937 North Auckland rugby union halfback. He "showed ability at getting the ball away from the five eighth position" especially after getting great service from Peter Mahima at halfback. He enlisted in the Second World War as part of the Māori Battalion and was killed on 16 December 1941 in the Western Desert of North Africa aged 28. He was buried at Knightsbridge War Cemetery, Acroma, Libya. For North Shore Jack Smith kicked five goals. Ponsonby and Richmond were level 10–10 at halftime before Richmond won 18–13. Ponsonby's goal kicking was poor with several close shots being missed perhaps costing them the game. Walter Stockley, Ponsonby's captain in 1937 made his first appearance of the season. Dacre Black, their halfback was injured early in the second half and went off with a broken knee cap. He spent some time in hospital and was ruled out for the season. Frank Halloran who had been the Ponsonby and New Zealand halfback in previous seasons was playing at full back and moved up to replace him. For Richmond their regular halfback of recent seasons Roy Powell played at fullback with Alan Watkins who had transferred from Mount Albert at halfback. Powell was "safe" at fullback "but was caught in possession too much" while Watkins "played a sound and heady game". Frank Furnell who was the usual full back "showed cleverness" at centre three-quarter. Papakura nearly had their first competition point in the first grade competition but with the scores tied 18–18 with time almost up City scored a try to Ryan after Jackie Rata made a break to send the backs away. Des Herring, the Mount Albert front rower again played brilliantly with the Auckland Star writing "last season Herring was a good forward. This season he has jumped into representative form. He was the inspiration of his side". Rata was "mercurial in the City three-quarter line". While their forward G McCarthy kept up with the play constantly and was rewarded with three tries.

16 April	Richmond	18-13 (10-10)	Ponsonby	Carlaw Park 1
3:00	Try: Jack McLeod 2, Merv Devine, Wally Tittleton; Con: Frank Furnell 2, George Tittleton		Try: Pat Young, Ernest McNeil, Edgar Morgan; Con: Dacre Black; Pen: Walter Stockley	Referee: Frank Thompson

16 April	Mount Albert	25-18 (7-10)	Newton	Carlaw Park 1
1:30	Try: Clarry McNeil 2, Bert Leatherbarrow 2, Basil Cranch; Con: Basil Cranch, Ted Mincham 3 Pen: Ted Mincham		Try: Bill McNeight, Ted Brimble, Wilfred Brimble, Donald Fraser; Con: Wilfred Brimble 2 Pen: Hill	Referee: Percy Rogers

16 April	Manukau	26-21 (8-19)	North Shore	Carlaw Park 2
3:00	Try: Tommy Chase 2, Jack Brodrick 2, Walter Brimble, Jack Hemi; Con: Jack Hemi 4		Try: Len Scott, Bob Banham, Arthur Sowter; Con: Jack Smith 3 Pen: Jack Smith 2, Dick Smith	Referee: Stuart Billman

16 April	City	23-18 (13-10)	Papakura	Carlaw Park 2
1:30	Try: Justin McCarthy 3, J Hutchinson, Ryan; Con: J Hutchinson 3, Cyril Wiberg		Try: John Fogarty 2, Craig Smith, Richard Burgess; Con: Thomas Kelly, J McInnes; Pen: J McInnes	Referee: T McIntosh

==== Round 3 ====
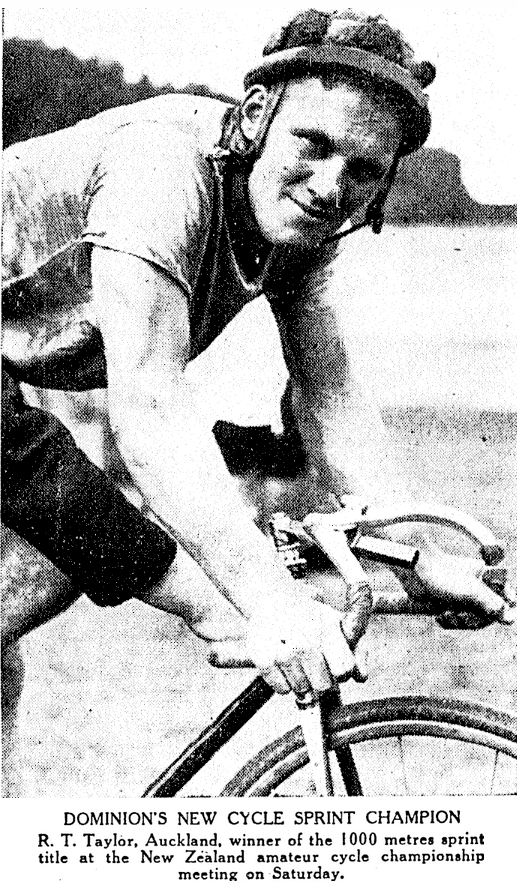
Roy Taylor, scored a try for Newton.

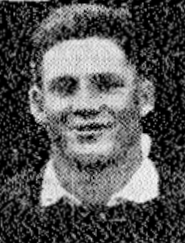
Len Scott scored for North Shore 12 years after his senior debut.

Three players were sent off in the Manukau-Marist match as a result of an "on field incident". George (Tiki) Whye of Manukau was suspended for a week, Bill Breed of Marist was "severely reprimanded", while Bill Glover also of Marist was unable to attend the disciplinary hearing and was ordered to stand down until able to attend. Angus Gault led the Manukau forwards playing an outstanding game while Jack Brodrick "charged for the Marist line every chance he got and at the end of one spectacular bounding run got their in style". North Shore scored a win against a strong Mount Albert side 15–11. The score was 12–11 before Len Scott, who had debuted for North Shore in 1926 scored to practically seal the game. Despite now being 31 years of age he was still able to outpace the opposition to gain the try. He was the most prolific try scorer in Auckland club rugby league in its early decades with 101 tries across over 140 games from 1926 to his eventual retirement in 1940. Bob Banham the Australian professional was said to have made a clear improvement in their backs. On the number two field at Carlaw Park the ground was heavy and described as "greasy" conditions. For Newton, twenty one year old Roy Taylor scored a try after recently joining their first grade side. He was an outstanding track cyclist who had two months earlier represented New Zealand in the 1938 British Empire Games in Sydney. He was unplaced in the 1,000 yard sprint and the time trial. He was still only 21 years of age. One of his Papatoetoe Amateur Cycling Club teammates, Arthur McInnarney was also about to start his first grade rugby league career for Mount Albert. In the match between City and Ponsonby, Dacre Black of Ponsonby broke his knee cap and was ruled out for the season. They also lost Pat Young, and Frank Halloran to injuries during the match. They had previously lost former Kiwi Arthur Kay to a leg injury in an earlier match. Frederick Gray Schroeder the King Country rugby union fullback debuted for Ponsonby and kicked a conversion and a penalty. He scored 34 points all from goals for them this season before returning to King Country. Their half back Dacre Black and centre Arthur Kay were absent through injury, though Brian Riley had recovered enough to be included and scored one of their four tries. For City their star was centre Jackie Rata who kicked three conversions and three penalties with several of them being "good efforts considering the heavy ground".

23 April	Manukau	18-4	Marist	Carlaw Park 1
3:00	Try: R Wilson 2, Jack Brodrick, Peter Mahima; Con: Jack Hemi 2 Pen: Jack Hemi		Pen: John Anderson 2	Referee: Frank Thompson

23 April	North Shore	15-11	Mount Albert	Carlaw Park 1
1:30	Try: Ted Scott, Horace Hunt, Len Scott; Con: Jack Smith; Pen: Jack Smith 2		Try: Des Herring, Len Schultz, Basil Cranch; Pen: Des Herring	Referee: Percy Rogers

23 April	Newton	8-7	Richmond	Carlaw Park 2
3:00	Try: Joseph Ginders, Roy Taylor; Pen: Wilfred Brimble		Try: Frank Furnell; Pen: Frank Furnell 2	Referee: Stuart Billman

23 April	City	24-16	Ponsonby	Carlaw Park 2
1:30	Try: Harold McCarthy 2, Justin McCarthy, Cyril Wyberg; Con: Jackie Rata 3 Pen: Jackie Rata 3		Try: Ernest McNeil 2, Brian Riley, Clarrie Petersen; Con: Frederick Schroeder; Pen: Frederick Schroeder	Referee: Owen Chalmers

==== Round 4 ====
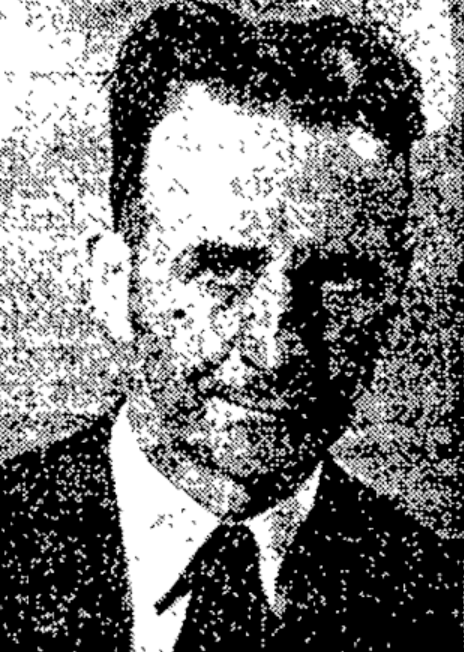
Stuart Billman, the referee in the controversial Richmond v North Shore game.

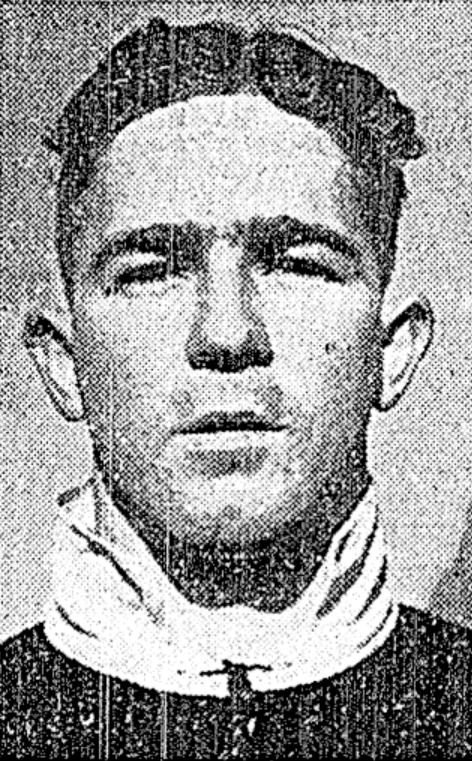
Arthur McInnarney

Richmond defeated North Shore after a late try awarded after an obstruction. However the referee allowed the ball carrier to run behind the posts with the conversion taken from in front. The rules stated that the kick should have been taken from inline with where the obstruction occurred. The league ordered the match to be replayed if required later in the season. As it turned out the match did not need to be replayed as it would have no bearing on the championship. George Tittleton the Richmond winger was running down the touchline a metre in and teammate Leo Davis was in support 5 yards behind and 6 yards in field. Verdun Scott, the North Shore fullback grabbed him and tried to push him out of the way and the referee (Stuart Billman) blew his whistle and called out "obstruction try". Instead of stopping the play he allowed Tittleton to run around behind the posts. Billman admitted to making an error of judgment saying that he should have let the play go as Tittleton was going to score anyway. And he also admitted to awarding the kick in the incorrect place when it should have been next to the touchline. Bob Banham had to retire during the match after receiving a cut above the eye after colliding with an opponent which required three stitches and this "upset" the North Shore backline. Ted Scott came out of the scrum to take Banham's position. In the North Shore forwards former Auckland cricket wicketkeeper Horace Hunt was showing very good form in his eighth season. While for Richmond their standouts were Merv Devine who had recently transferred from Wellington, Jack McLeod, the former Taranaki representative, and Harold Tetley. Abbie Graham was not a success at centre three quarter despite receiving good service from second five eighth Wally Tittleton. Arthur McInnarney scored his first senior points for Mt Albert after transferring from the Ellerslie third grade team where he had been coached by Charles Gregory. The nineteen year old would be selected for New Zealand in 1939. For Mt Albert in their 18–13 win over Marist, Des Herring was again said to have been outstanding along with his opponent Joe Woods. At halfback for Marist Robert Grotte similarly had a very good game. Each team was missing a star player through injury, Martin Hansen in the case of Mt Albert, and Reginald Haslam for Marist. Newton had a comfortable win over rivals City by 28 to 11 after leading 16–2 at halftime. Their backs were very impressive particularly A Duncan on the wing who used his size and speed to advantage. He was said to be the biggest winger seen in the rugby league game in Auckland "for some years". Also the Brimble brothers Wilfred and Ted showed their superiority in the halves. In their forwards Bill McNeight was "the best" while for City the McCarthy brothers, Harold and Justin stood out. Papakura were unlucky to lose to Ponsonby after leading 11–3 at halftime. Ponsonby only took the lead in the final ten minutes. They were largely beaten by the efforts of Ponsonby backs Jack Campbell and Ernest McNeil who each scored two tries. Ponsonby's best forwards were Clarrie Petersen at lock, and front rower Edgar Morgan who "both must have claims for inclusion in the representative trial games".

30 April	Richmond	20-19* (10-14)	North Shore	Carlaw Park 1
3:00	Try: Noel Bickerton, Harold Tetley, Laurie Mills, George Tittleton; Con: Frank Furnell 4		Try: George Zane-Zaninovich, Ted Scott, McIntosh; Con: Jack Smith; Pen: Jack Smith 4	Referee: Stuart Billman

30 April	Mount Albert	18-13 (8-9)	Marist	Carlaw Park 1
1:30	Try: Len Schultz, Ted Mincham, Jack Tristram, Arthur McInnarney; Con: Ted Mincham 2, Bert Leatherbarrow		Try: F McLaren; Con: John Anderson; Pen: John Anderson 4	Referee: Owen Chalmers

30 April	Newton	28-11 (18-2)	City	Carlaw Park 2
3:00	Try: Donald Fraser, W.B. McKenzie 2, Joseph Ginders, Bill McNeight, A Duncan; Con: A Duncan, Wilfred Brimble 3 Pen: Hill		Try: Herbert Thompson; Con: J Hutchinson; Pen: Jackie Rata 3	Referee: Roy Otto

30 April	Ponsonby	19-13 (3-11)	Papakura	Carlaw Park 2
1:30	Try: Clarrie Petersen, Jack Campbell 2, Ernest McNeil 2 Con: Frederick Schroeder, Roy Nurse		Try: George Osborne; Pen: J McInnes 5	Referee: G Kelly

==== Round 5 ====
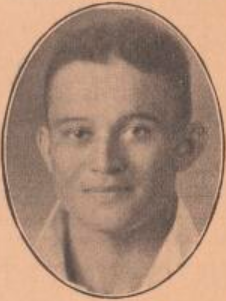
Wilfred Brimble the Hawaiian born Newton halfback who had been in brilliant form.

Robert (Bob) Grotte, the Marist halfback.

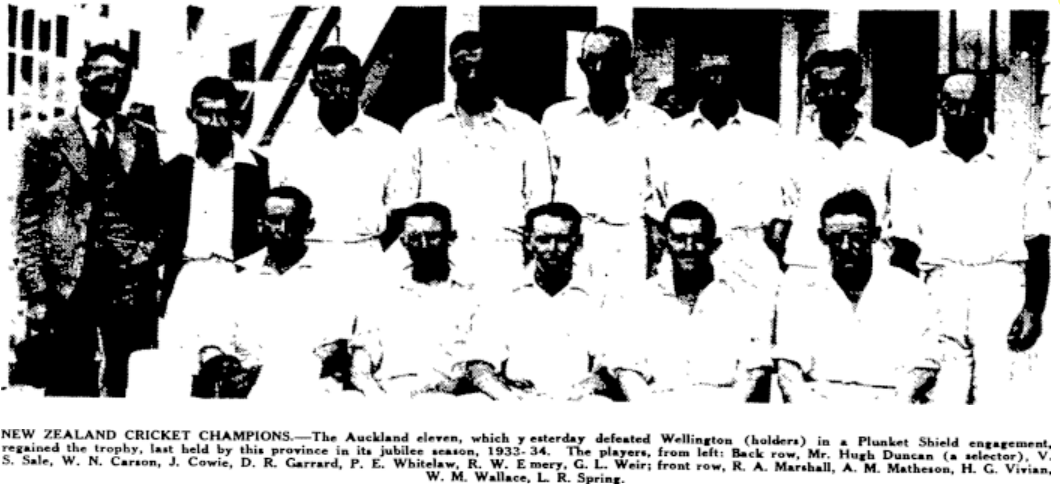
The Auckland cricket team of 1937 showing Robert Marshall in the front row. He debuted for Mt Albert in the five eighths.

The Manukau v Mt Albert game was spoiled by a large number of breaches of the rules. Manukau led 12–4 at halftime but rested on its laurels somewhat with the Mt Albert forwards taking the ascendancy in the second half. Jack Hemi was safe at fullback for Manukau and kicked four goals and his field kicking was "strong and accurate". Mt Albert pulled the score back to 12-9 but Len Schultz was caught in possession on his line and from the turn over Manukau scored a converted try to make the score 17-9 which it remained. Arthur McInnarney and Robert Marshall, the Auckland cricket wicket keeper played together in the five eighths for the first time and were impressive giving "far more thrust on attack than had been shown in previous matches". Walter Brimble was "outstanding" at first five eighth. He "handled splendidly and his quickness off the mark gave the players outside him every opportunity. He made several fine openings and was always handy when defensive work was required". His brother Ted was also very good and in comments in the Auckland Star during the week they said "the real strength of Newton lies in their back play, and particularly the fine understanding that there is between Wilfred Brimble behind the scrum, and his brother, E [Ted] Brimble, at first five eight. Between them they show both sharpness and penetration, with the result that the men outside them get chances in attack which are up to now denied backs in some of the other teams". Claude Dempsey made his first appearance of the season for Newton at fullback and showed he is "one of the best positional players in the game" in his ninth season of first grade rugby league for Newton. Once again Des Herring was "outstanding" for Mt Albert in the forwards. Richmond had a hard-fought win over Marist 13 to 8 with Marist close to drawing the game at the end when they attacked for the last 10 minutes and at one point Bob Grotte made a run from a scrum 20 yards out but his pass to front rower Bill Breed was dropped on the try line. Grotte was "the best back on the ground" and was involved in the best try of the game when he "raced away before passing to [Reginald] Haslam, who beat the defence badly and [Gordon] Midgley scored". Midgley was a former competitive sprinter and his speed "demonstrated the value he is to a side". Lyndsay Jack who debuted on the wing was "prominent" for Richmond. In Newton's 34–17 win against Papakura they played a fast and open game with Wilfred Brimble at halfback being "easily the best back on the ground". For Papakura, A. Burgess was their best back while Benny Crocker, the former Marist halfback "also played a good game". North Shore dominated the first half to lead City 18–4 at the interval. But in the second half City played much better scoring 12 points to 6, especially in the backs who had been poor earlier. For North Shore, 20 year old Jack Smith "played a splendid game at fullback and made several nice openings. His goal kicking was a feature of the game". While his 26-year-old brother Dick Smith "played his best game of the season and did a lot of useful work on attack. Verdun Scott was also good being "the best of the three quarters" and his cousin Ted Scott "played a sterling game and was in every attacking movement". In the City side, Jackie Rata and Joseph Hapi were their best backs with Hapi showing "a lot of speed on the wing".

7 May	Manukau	17-9 (12-4)	Mount Albert	Carlaw Park 1
3:00	Try: Walter Brimble, R Wilson, Jack Brodrick; Con: Jack Hemi 2 Pen: Jack Hemi 2		Try: Des Herring; Pen: Ted Mincham 3	Referee: Percy Rogers

7 May	Richmond	13-8 (3-3)	Marist	Carlaw Park 1
1:30	Try: Lyndsay Jack, Alf Broadhead, Merv Devine; Con: Frank Furnell 2		Try: Gordon Midgley 2 Con: John Anderson	Referee: Maurice Wetherill

7 May	Newton	34-17	Papakura	Carlaw Park 2
3:00	Try: Ted Brimble 2, Joseph Ginders 2, Roy Taylor, Bill McNeight, W McKenzie, Claude Dempsey; Con: Wilfred Brimble 4, A Duncan		Try: John Fogarty, C Ross, J McInnes; Pen: J McInnes 4	Referee: Frank Thompson

7 May	North Shore	24-16 (18-4)	City	Carlaw Park 2
1:30	Try: Bennetts 2, Dick Smith 2, Verdun Scott, Ted Scott; Con: Jack Smith 2 Pen: Jack Smith		Try: Joseph Hapi, Leslie Wehner; Con: Jackie Rata; Pen: Jackie Rata 4	Referee: A Kinnaird

==== Round 6 ====
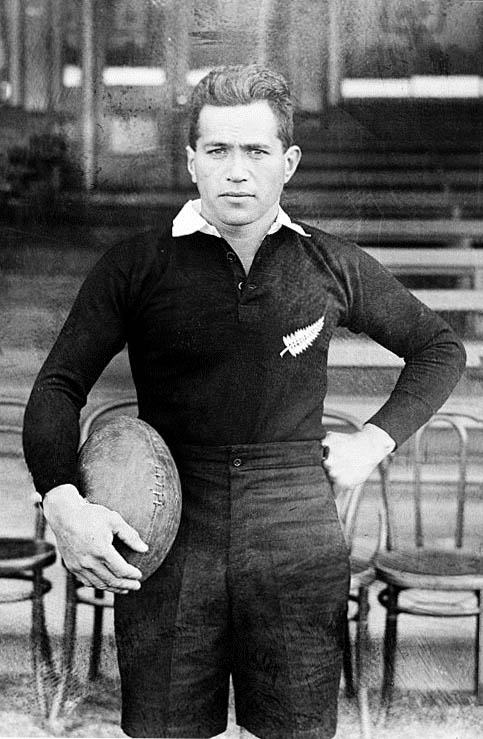
George Nēpia debuted for Manukau at full back.

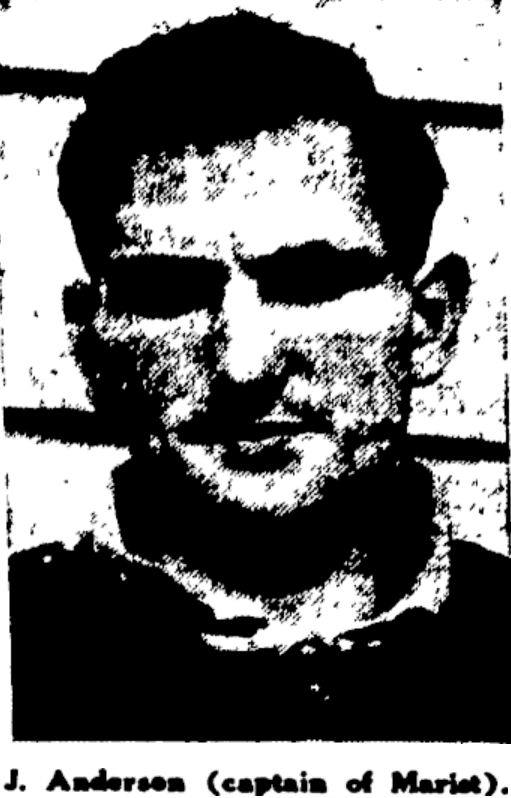
John Anderson, the Marist captain scored 18 points in their win.

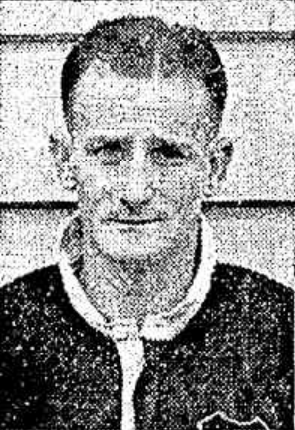
Jack Smith kicked seven goals for North Shore.

A highlight of the round was the debut appearance of George Nepia at fullback for Manukau in their win over Richmond. It was said that he had a "sound game" but did not look match fit. He had been playing rugby league since 1935 in England and a handful of games in New Zealand including for New Zealand in 1937. Pita Ririnui was sent off for Manukau and Alf Broadhead for Richmond near the end of the game for fighting. They were both severely cautioned by the control board with Broadhead warned that a similar offence would be dealt with more severely. Also during the match Jack Brodrick went off to have a dislocated finger attended to. When he came back on he found that he had been replaced and so referee Maurice Wetherill made him leave the field once more. The match was described as "great" with Richmond unlucky to lose. They had reorganised their backline with Frank Furnell at full back and Trevor Bramley, a promoted junior, debuting on the wing and playing well. Noel Bickerton moved from first five eighth to second five eighth with Roy Powell going to first five eighth to partner with Alan Watkins at halfback. Powell and Watkins "showed fine understanding" though Bickerton was "caught in possession too often". All of the Manukau forwards were mentioned as having fine games, particularly Pita Ririnui, Angus Gault, and Jack Brodrick, with George (Tiki) Whye, Freddie McGuire, and Harry Zane-Zaninovich all playing well also. In the Richmond pack Jack McLeod was "the best forward on the ground". A notable feature in the North Shore – Papakura game was that a total of 10 penalty goals were kicked, five by Jack Smith and five by J McInnes with McInnes also converting their try while Smith converted both of their tries. The goal kicking in the senior grade was arguably the strongest it has ever been with John Anderson, Jack Hemi, Jack Smith, and J McInnes kicking a large number of goals most weeks. Player coach, Bob Banham scored a brilliant try for North Shore to help them to their win. Smith was brilliant for them at fullback, while Jack and George Zane-Zaninovich combined well in the backs. In the forwards Horace Hunt played in the unusual position of hooker but got "a fair share of possession and played well in the loose". The Papakura forwards were "superb" with John Fogarty the best. Ponsonby narrowly beat Newton 10–9 with both fullbacks saving their sides repeatedly, Walter Stockley for Ponsonby and H Kendall for Newton. Frank Halloran was back in his more accustomed position of half back, with Brian Riley back on the wing where he received great support from Arthur Kay at centre three quarter who scored a brilliant try. Ted Brimble and Wilfred Brimble played their usual outstanding games in the halves and deserved better results with the service they gave their back. Their forwards played well but played offside quite often and it ultimately cost them the game through being penalised. A promoted junior, Blackman, kicked two penalties for Ponsonby which decided the game. Marist thrashed City 45–11 with 11 tries. The score at halftime was only 8–4. Gordon Midgley scored a hat trick on the wing, and Robert Grotte, John Anderson, and Joe Woods all scoring doubles. Grotte's play at halfback was said to have been as good as any of the best halfbacks in Auckland. Reginald Haslam broke through the City backs constantly and Gordon Midgley benefited, being the best back on the ground. City was unfortunate to lose hooker, Leslie Wehner to an eye injury during the first half. Joe Woods was the best forward for Marist, while Anderson scored 18 points through his six goals and two tries.

14 May	Manukau	18-16	Richmond	Carlaw Park 1
3:00	Try: Pita Ririnui, Rangi Chase 2, Freddie McGuire; Con: Jack Hemi 2 Pen: Jack Hemi		Try: Merv Devine, Wally Tittleton, Alf Broadhead, Roy Powell; Con: Frank Furnell 2	Referee: Maurice Wetherill

14 May	Ponsonby	10-9 (3-2)	Newton	Carlaw Park 1
1:30	Try: Arthur Kay, Brian Riley; Pen: Blackman 2		Try: Bill McNeight; Pen: A Duncan 2, Wilfred Brimble	Referee: Frank Thompson

14 May	Marist	45-11 (8-4)	City	Carlaw Park 2
3:00	Try: John Anderson 2, Joe Woods 2, Gordon Midgley 3, Robert Grotte 2, Ray Halsey, Griffin; Con: John Anderson 6		Try: Ryan; Con: J Hutchinson; Pen: Jackie Rata 3	Referee: Percy Rogers

14 May	North Shore	20-15 (11-8)	Papakura	Carlaw Park 2
1:30	Try: Ted Scott, Bob Banham; Con: Jack Smith 2 Pen: Jack Smith 5		Try: G Osborne; Con: J McInnes; Pen: J McInnes 5	Referee: T Evans

==== Round 7 ====
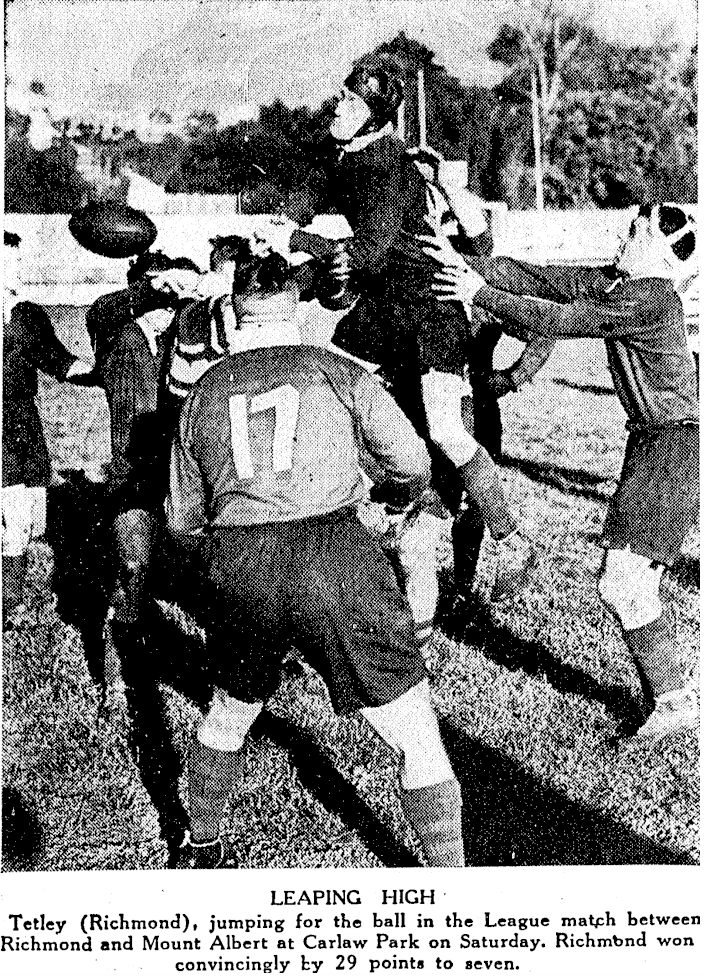
Harold Tetley, the Richmond lock leaping to catch the ball.

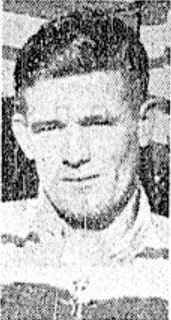
Frank Halloran, the Ponsonby halfback.

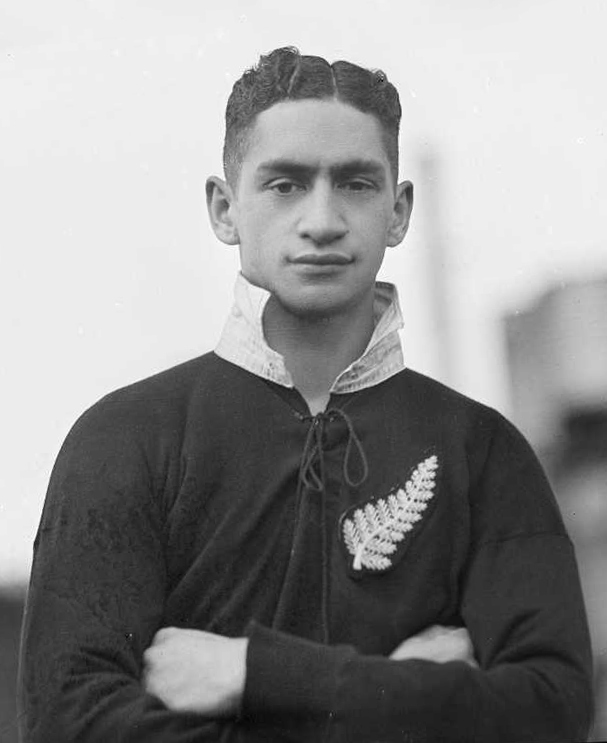
Jack Hemi (Manukau) was key in Manukau's win with his goal kicking and field kicking.

New Zealand representatives, Jack and Dick Smith were both absent for North Shore after their father died during the week. Both teams wore white armbands as a mark of respect. Mt Albert were outplayed "in all departments" and despite the fact that Richmond lost Frank Furnell, Merv Devine, and Lyndsay Jack to injury in the first half their replacements George Tittleton, Hilton, and Trevor Bramley fitted in well into their back combination. Tittleton was "easily the best wing on the ground". His brother Wally "again shone in all-round play", while Roy Powell was good at halfback. The opposing hookers, Bert Leatherbarrow (Mt Albert), and Jack Satherley (Richmond) both hooked well. Manukau beat City 23–19 with Jack Hemi's four conversions helping them to the win. City started the second half strongly, led by Bob Banham who had been transferred their by Auckland Rugby League from North Shore. They scored three tries in quick succession and got within one point of Manukau. Manukau scored a try to Joe Broughton following a brilliant run by Tommy Chase. Hemi "played a fine game" at fullback and turned defence into attack through his lengthy kicking. In their forwards Angus Gault "was the pick". The City hooker, Leslie Wehner was their best. The match between Marist and Papakura on the number 2 ground never reached great heights. Reginald Haslam had dropped back to fullback for Marist, until Robert Grotte dropped back there "obviously nursing himself" before the Australian tour. With Haslam moving back to his natural centre three quarter position their superiority "became obvious". Marist led 11–2 after Gordon Midgley kicked and the Papakura fullback made a mess of it allowing Grotte to score. The Papakura forwards rallied and made two "spirited attacks" which they scored from though J McInnes just failed to convert them and Marist held on to win. Phil Donovan was the best Marist back and played well at halfback when Grotte moved out. For Papakura, John Fogarty was "outstanding" in the forwards. In Ponsonby's 16–7 win over North Shore at the Devonport Domain, their centre three quarter Brian Riley "played a brilliant game... and was in every movement which penetrated the defence. His two tries came from "clever individual efforts". Jack Campbell on the wing "played a fine game and is a most promising player". He would transfer to Canterbury the following year and be selected for the New Zealand team to tour England. Frank Halloran played his best game of the season at halfback. In the Ponsonby forwards L Cootes was "outstanding". In the North Shore backs, Verdun Scott at fullback "was easily the best player for fullback". George Zane-Zaninovich was good at first five eighth while Ivor Stirling was prominent on defence at halfback. In their forward Arthur Sowter was singled out as "the pick".

28 May	Richmond	29-7 (8-5)	Mount Albert	Carlaw Park
3:00	Try: George Tittleton 2, Noel Bickerton, Harold Tetley, Laurie Mills, Jack Satherley, Alf Broadhead; Con: George Tittleton 2, Frank Furnell; Pen: Trevor Bramley		Try: Joseph Gunning; Con: Ted Mincham; Pen: Des Herring	Referee: Maurice Wetherill

28 May	Manukau	23-19 (20-8)	City	Carlaw Park 1
1:30	Try: R Wilson 2, Peter Mahima, Joe Broughton, Angus Gault; Con: Jack Hemi 4		Try: Ryan 2, Arnold Porteous 2, Leslie Wehner; Con: J Hutchinson 2	Referee: G Kelly

28 May	Marist	11-8 (6-2)	Papakura	Carlaw Park 2
3:00	Try: Bill Breed, Clive Murdoch, Robert Grotte; Con: Clive Murdoch		Try: D Buchanan, John Fogarty; Con: J McInnes	Referee: A Kinnaird

28 May	North Shore	7-16	Ponsonby	Devonport Domain
3:00	Try: V Bennetts; Pen: Verdun Scott 2		Try: Brian Riley 2, Jack Campbell, Edgar Morgan; Con: Frederick Schroeder; Pen: Frederick Schroeder	Referee: Roy Otto

==== Round 8 ====
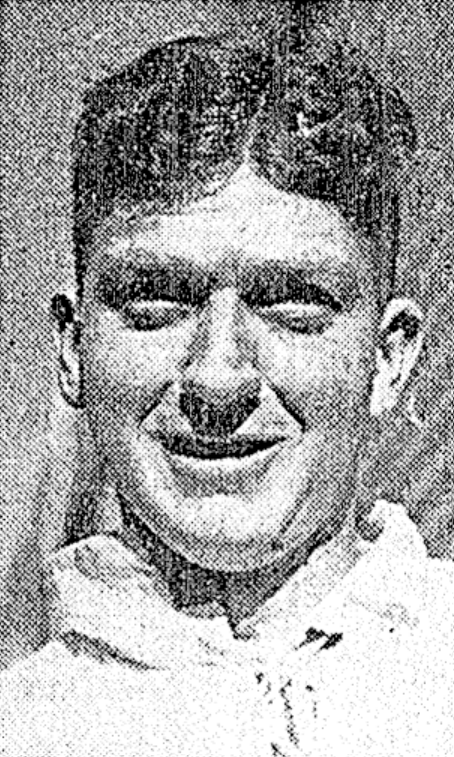
Ross Jones the North Shore forward who was on debut

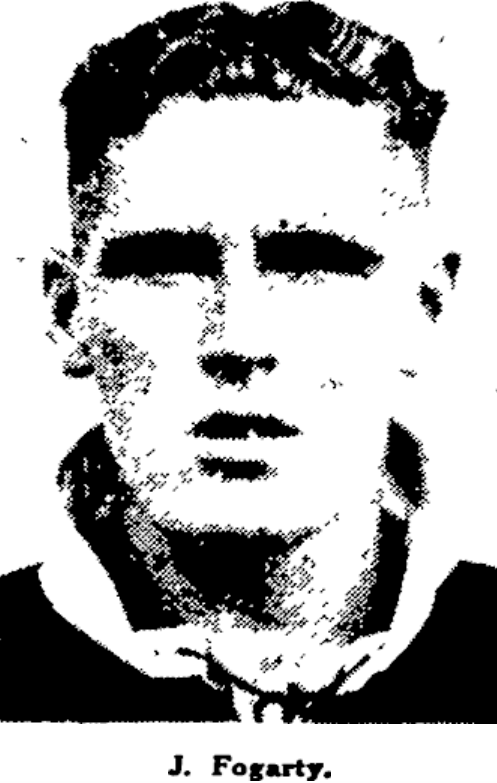
John Fogarty, the impressive Papakura forward who scored a spectacular try.

Ross Jones debuted for North Shore at the age of 20 having previously played rugby union for Matakana and was "the best of the forwards". He grew up on the North Shore and was the Auckland Junior Cycling Champion in 1934. Interestingly champion track cyclists Roy Taylor and Arthur McInnarney had also made their senior rugby league debuts the same season. Taylor scored two tries on the wing for Newton in their 11–10 win over North Shore. Ross' son, Murray Jones was an All Black in 1973. Ross was selected for the aborted 1939 New Zealand rugby league tour of England and played in both matches (v St Helens and Dewsbury). After he returned to New Zealand he moved back to Matakana and essentially retired though did return to play briefly for the North Shore in 1941. North Shore was unlucky to lose with Verdun Scott just missing three shots at goal. Steve Watene made one of his first appearances for Newton after transferring from Manukau. Claude Dempsey also made his third appearance. Edgar Tredea played well at halfback in place of Wilfred Brimble who was on tour with New Zealand. Papakura recorded their first ever win in the Fox Memorial competition with an 18–15 win over Manukau on Carlaw Park 2. Manukau were missing five of their best players who were on the New Zealand tour of Australia but still fielded a strong side. During the match outside back Richard Burgess of Papakura fractured his left arm. Papakura took the lead in the game when John Fogarty scored a long range individual try after breaking clear near halfway and "brushed aside several tacklers" before a centering kick where he outpaced Tommy Chase to score. Reginald Haslam was ordered off for Marist in their 13–7 win over Ponsonby after "coming to grips" with Ponsonby lock Clarrie Petersen late in the match and after the linesman advised the referee Haslam was sent from the field. Marist were missing three players who were away with the New Zealand side. Phil Donovan played at halfback in place of Robert Grotte and struggled in a position unnatural to him, sending out "bad passes". Ernie Pinches scored a try for Mt Albert in his first season for them. He had been born in England in 1914 before moving to New Zealand. He became well known for wrestling, holding the New Zealand light heavyweight title for 6 years in the 1950s. In the same decade he was elected to the Mt Roskill Borough Council. He was deputy mayor there from 1974 to 1987 and acting mayor from 1987 to 1988 and later had a street and footbridge over the motorway after him. Frank Pickrang made his first appearance of the season for Ponsonby and "was always in the picture". Edgar Morgan and Clarrie Petersen played "outstanding games" alongside him.

4 June	Marist	13-7	Ponsonby	Carlaw Park 1
3:00	Try: Ray Halsey, Jimmy Chalmers, Jimmy Matthews; Pen: Clive Murdoch, Phil Donovan		Try: Clarrie Petersen; Con: Frank Halloran; Pen: Frank Halloran	Referee: A McIntosh

4 June	Newton	11-10	North Shore	Carlaw Park 1
1:30	Try: Roy Taylor 2, W.B. McKenzie; Con: A Duncan		Try: V Bennetts 2 Pen: Verdun Scott 2	Referee: K McIvor

4 June	Mount Albert	29-10	City	Carlaw Park 2
3:00	Try: Arthur McInnarney 3, Ernie Pinches, Ted Mincham, Richard Shadbolt, Joseph Gunning; Con: A MacLachlan 2		Try: Arnold Porteous, Leslie Wehner; Con: J Hutchinson; Pen: J Hutchinson	Referee: A Lennie

4 June	Papakura	18-15	Manukau	Carlaw Park 1
1:30	Try: J McInnes, G Osborne, Benny Crocker, John Fogarty; Con: J McInnes 3		Try: R Wilson 2, Mihaka Panapa; Con: Tommy Chase 2 Pen: Tommy Chase	Referee: Jack Hawkes

==== Round 9 ====
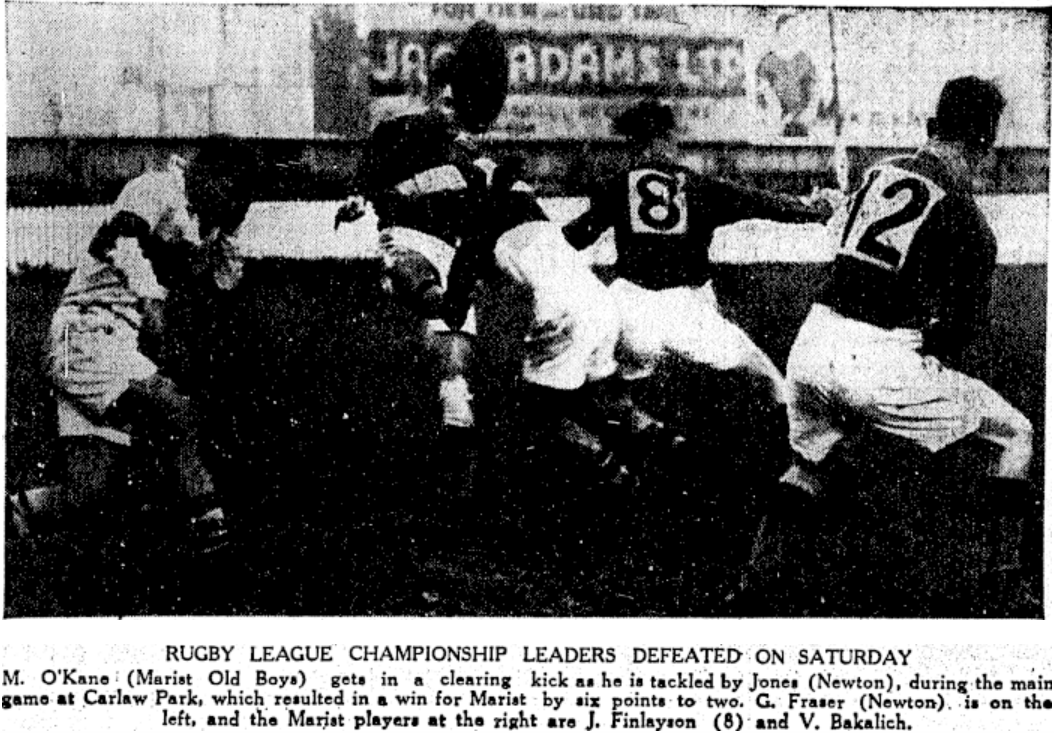
Action from the Marist - Newton match.

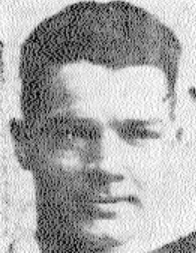
Thirty five year old Claude List, the Marist back in his 14th senior season.

For Marist in their 6–2 win over Newton, their five eighth, Clive Murdoch was "brilliant". In the second half he "evaded the defence" three times and "only lack of support lost Marist tries". In their forwards Joe Woods was the best, nearly scoring "after beating half the Newton team". For Ponsonby Edgar Morgan "was the best of the forwards" in their 13–5 win over Manukau, while Pita Ririnui was the best for Manukau. In the backs Pat Young played a good game and "scored a fine try" while the young five eighth he partnered with, Carr, also went well as did the promoted junior, Rush at halfback. In the match between Papakura and Mount Albert, the Papakura player Dobbyn had his nose broken. He was able to return to play a week later however. Papakura were poor and were said to have been lucky to keep their opponents score to just 27. Mt Albert's best try came after Black fielded an attempted drop goal by Wilson and "ran strongly before transferring to Claude List, who sent on to Richard Shadbolt, and Bert Leatherbarrow took the final pass for a great try". In Richmond's 19–3 win over City they fielded a number of junior players. Frank Furnell was very good at fullback, while two of the younger players, Trevor Bramley and Laurie Mills "showed very promising form". In the City backs, Stanaway, a former Northern Wairoa rugby representative was "outstanding". With North Shore having a bye their fullback, Verdun Scott turned out for his old North Shore football (soccer) side in their match against Eastern Suburbs. He scored one of their two goals. Whilst players were not permitted to play both rugby union and rugby league by either of those sporting bodies there was no rule disallowing it between rugby league and other codes. Scott was also a very well known cricketer in the summer and represented Auckland and later New Zealand.

11 June	Marist	6-2 (3-2)	Newton	Carlaw Park 1
3:00	Try: Jimmy Matthews, Phil Donovan		Pen: Fredrick Sissons	Referee: Percy Rogers

11 June	Ponsonby	13-5	Manukau	Carlaw Park 1
1:30	Try: Roy Nurse, Jack Campbell, Pat Young; Pen: Frederick Schroeder 2		Try: W Pile; Pen: Tommy Chase	Referee: Frank Thompson

11 June	Mount Albert	27-0 (11-0)	Papakura	Carlaw Park 2
3:00	Try: Richard Shadbolt, Charles Dunne, Bert Leatherbarrow 2, Arthur McInnarney, Black, Martin Hansen; Con: Bert Leatherbarrow, H McLaughlin 2			Referee: Maurice Wetherill

11 June	Richmond	19-3 (14-3)	City	Carlaw Park 2
1:30	Try: Roy Powell 2, Alf Broadhead 2, Hermes Hadley; Con: Frank Furnell; Pen: Frank Furnell		Try: Stanaway	Referee: H Tate

==== Round 10 ====
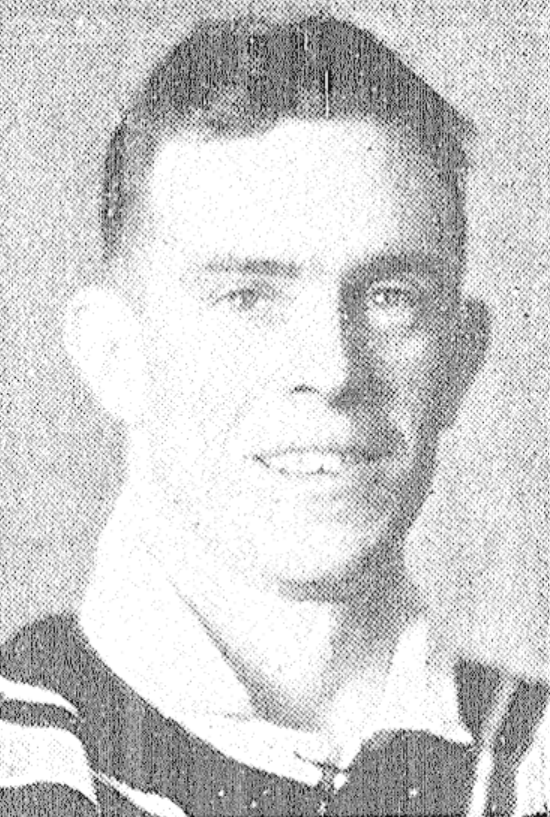
Jack Campbell, the promising young Ponsonby back.

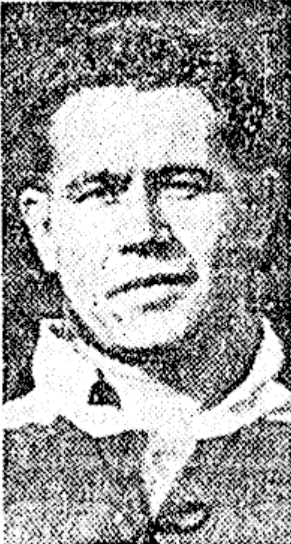
Jack Tristram (Mt Albert loose forward)

Ponsonby lost to Marist 10–8 with Brian Riley losing the ball over the line for what would have been the winning try. Neither backline played particularly well with most of them coming in for criticism from the New Zealand Herald, with most praise for Mt Albert forward, Martin Hansen who "did some great work both on attack and defence". Jack Tristram, Ernie Pinches and Claude List's younger brother Frederick List all played well also. They also noted prophetically that Ponsonby winger Jack Campbell "is a determined runner...[and] if he goes on improving he is destined for higher honours in the game". For Manukau in their 5–2 win against Newton, their best back was Peter Mahima who usually at halfback was moved out to five eighth with Walter Brimble away with the New Zealand team. He "made many nice openings", while Joe Broughton at centre played his best game of the season. Manukau had struggled to field a team with so many of their players away on the representative tour and had to play Harry Zane-Zaninovich, usually a forward, at fullback. He "made few mistakes and his tackling was a feature of the game". In their forwards Shilton was the best not only of their side but on the field. Veteran, Claude Dempsey "played a sound game and kicked with good judgement" at fullback for Newton. Experienced five eighth, Ted Brimble was "outstanding, and made good openings on attack". Marist easily beat North Shore 26–4 with the Marist backs all playing very good games. For North Shore Verdun Scott was good at fullback while his relative Ted Scott who had played all over the field in a long career but in more recent years at lock, was at halfback for this game and "was a tower of strength... and excelled in defence". Dick Smith who had represented New Zealand in 1932, played well at five eighths and made two breaks which should have resulted in tries. Of their forward Arthur Sowter was the best. The Papakura – Richmond match was played at Prince Edward Park in Papakura. It was the first time Papakura had played a 1st grade championship game on their home ground. The scores were level 10–10 in the second half when both A Burgess and Benny Crocker left the field injured leaving Papakura with just 11 players. Richmond went on to win 16–10 with George Tittleton who usually played in the outside backs playing in the forwards and scoring two tries. The Papakura team included Buckeridge who had broken some ribs three weeks earlier, and Dobbyn who had broken his nose the week before.

18 June	Mount Albert	10-8 (3-6)	Ponsonby	Carlaw Park 1
3:00	Try: Francis List, Martin Hansen; Con: A MacLachlan; Pen: A MacLachlan		Try: Brown, Jack Campbell; Pen: Dan Schroeder	Referee: Maurice Wetherill

18 June	Manukau	5-2	Newton	Carlaw Park 1
1:30	Try: Kirkwood; Con: Joe Broughton		Pen: Hill	Referee: Percy Rogers

18 June	Marist	26-4	North Shore	Carlaw Park 2
3:00	Try: Ray Halsey, Clive Murdoch, Jimmy Matthews, Joe Woods, Vincent Bakalich, Billy Grotte; Con: Jimmy Matthews 3 Pen: Jimmy Matthews 2		Pen: Verdun Scott 2	Referee: Frank Thompson

18 June	Papakura	10-16 (7-5)	Richmond	Prince Edward Park, Papakura
3:00	Try: Percy Herkt, Athol Burgess; Con: J McInnes; Pen: J McInnes		Try: Lyndsay Jack, Merv Devine, George Tittleton 2 Con: Frank Furnell 2	Referee: George Kelly

==== Round 11 ====
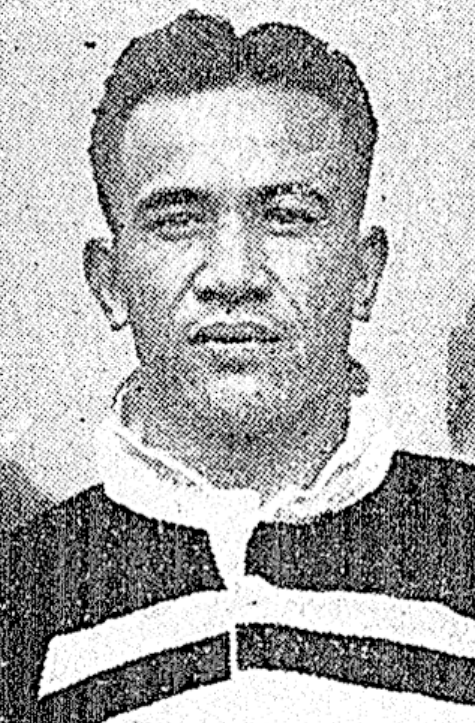
Tommy Chase, the Manukau fullback who played an outstanding game in their heavy defeat.

Ponsonby led Richmond 11–9 at halftime and went on to win 19–13. In the first half they lost Roy Nurse to injury which meant that Clarrie Petersen moved from the back of the scrum to fill his place while Blackman came on as a substitute. After this Jack Campbell scored a brilliant individual try which "thrilled the spectators", then "a brilliant reverse passing movement" which involved Pat Young, Brown, Frank Pickrang, and Petersen before Young scored. In the second half Ponsonby scored two more tries and the lone try to Richmond was controversial when Laurie Mills was awarded it but "never got near to touching down" and "caused a demonstration from the spectators in the grandstand". Even with Edgar Morgan going off with an injured arm was unable to stop Ponsonby from their win. Brian Riley moved from centre three-quarter to second five-eighths and his "tricky running... was a thorn in the side of the defence" and he "played a fine all-round game". Pat Young at first five eighths continued to be in "fine form". Wilfred Dormer was on debut at halfback after moving from Pt Chevalier and "got the ball away splendidly". Despite Young's good play Roy Powell was said to be better but he did not combine so well with Alan Watkins at halfback. Mt Albert won 18–13, scoring four tries to one with their forward pack dominating. Their forwards in fact score all four tries. Frederick Sissons played on the wing and kicked five penalty goals for Newton. Papakura beat City due to their forwards being better. J McInnes who is usually a good kicked missed three shots at goal. It was left to Wilson to kick their only goal and City led 5–2 at halftime. John Fogarty was the best of the Papakura forwards and well supported by Lyndsay Evans and P Herkt. For City, Jackie Rata "was the best of the backs" and was "unlucky not to win the game for his team after a brilliant run through the opposition". He was unlucky to be playing with a relatively weak backline and with a "stronger team of backs who could play to him more quickly he would probably be the leading centre in the game in Auckland". Their player-coach, Bob Banham was unable to play due to injuries suffered the previous week. North Shore only led by 9 at halftime but in the second half "scored almost at leisure, in spite of the tackling of Tommy Chase, who stood out as the best back on the ground". Verdun Scott moved up from full back and made some nice openings and was responsible for some good tries scored by Trevor Hammill on debut on the wing. The North Shore loose forwards, McIntosh, Arthur Sowter, Ross Jones, and Hugh Simpson "played with great dash in the loose".

25 June	Ponsonby	19-13 (11-9)	Richmond	Carlaw Park 1
3:00	Try: Brian Riley, Jack Campbell 2, Pat Young, Clarrie Petersen; Con: Frederick Schroeder; Pen: Wilfred Dormer		Try: Laurie Mills, Hermes Hadley, Alf Broadhead; Con: Frank Furnell; Pen: Frank Furnell	Referee: Frank Thompson

25 June	Mount Albert	18-13 (13-4)	Newton	Carlaw Park 1
1:30	Try: Martin Hansen 2, Jack Tristram, Bert Leatherbarrow; Con: A MacLachlan 2 Pen: A MacLachlan		Try: Roy Taylor; Pen: Fredrick Sissons 5	Referee: Jack Hawkes

25 June	North Shore	37-7	Manukau	Carlaw Park 2
3:00	Try: Trevor Hammill 3, Verdun Scott 2, Ross Jones 2, George Zane-Zaninovich, Arthur Sowter; Con: Dick Smith 5		Try: Joe Broughton; Con: Tommy Chase; Pen: Tommy Chase	Referee: A Pearson

25 June	Papakura	9-8 (2-5)	City	Carlaw Park 2
1:30	Try: E Cossey; Con: E Cossey; Pen: E Cossey, Wilson		Try: Leslie Wehner, Stanaway; Con: Jackie Rata	Referee: A Simpson

==== Round 12 ====
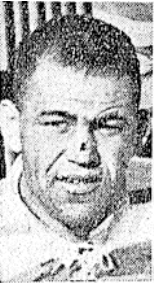
Frank Pickrang, good Ponsonby forward.

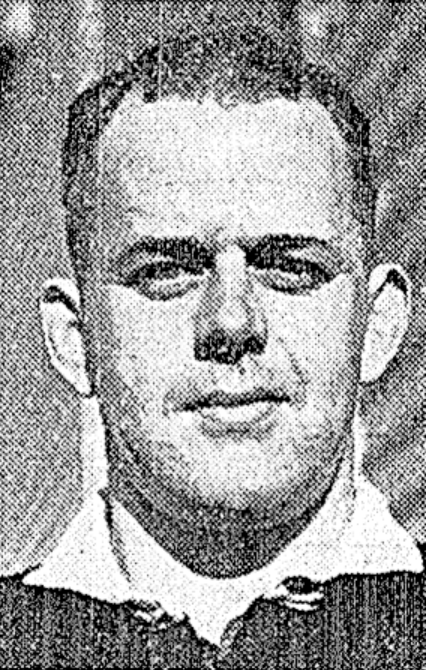
Bert Leatherbarrow who scored two tries for Mt Albert.

Prime Minister, Michael Joseph Savage was a guest of the Auckland Rugby League and came to Carlaw Park to watch some of the play. He was accompanied by Auckland Mayor Sir Ernest Davis, and New Zealand rugby league president John A. Lee and along with his party was "entertained at an afternoon tea organised by the ladies’ social committee". In the match between Mt Albert and North Shore the North Shore side dominated the first half but squandered several opportunities made by their backs. Ted Scott at halfback made two breaks, the first saw him hold on too long when Horace Hunt or Ross Jones would have scored, the second saw him pass to Dick Smith who only needed to pass to George Zane-Zaninovich to score but he held on. In the second half Mt Albert began to play better, particularly Joseph Gunning who was returning from a month out with injury. He was the best forward on the ground. Arthur McInnarney played well after playing at centre in this game and his brother Ray who had just transferred from Ellerslie United (Arthur's junior club also) on the wing was good. Bert Leatherbarrow playing at prop rather than hooker scored two tries. In the earlier kickoff on #1 Newton played superbly to beat Richmond. Ted Brimble was "the bright star in the backline". Claude Dempsey played in his old position of fullback and "was most reliable in defence, and his tackling and well-directed kicking proved invaluable". Regular forward Alex Nathan was absent as was the experienced Steve Watene but Joseph Ginders, Clem Proctor, Donald Fraser, and Jones "were always on the ball". Their coach, J. Lee made his first appearance of the season which gave their forwards "infused vigour". For Richmond Frank Furnell played well at fullback and they were unfortunate to lose Trevor Bramley to injury early in the second half leaving them with 12 players. On the number 2 field Marist defeated Manukau 24–3 on a ground in "a very bad state". Marist winger Jimmy Matthews scored three tries with one coming after a "spectacular dash to secure the best try of the game". Reginald Haslam at centre was very good, setting up three of his teams tries. In the Manukau side Tommy Chase at fullback played well. By the time the second game on the number 2 field between City v Ponsonby was coming to a close the field "resembled a quagmire". Ponsonby was penalised 17 times in the first half for mostly incorrect playing of the ball and as a result the forwards started to stand out of the loose rucks. L Cootes of Ponsonby was ordered off for striking a City opponent late in the game and soon afterwards 25 year old, Turi Albert Macpherson broke his leg when he collided with a Ponsonby forward who was kicking at the ball. Earlier in the match Leslie Wehner had to go off and was replaced by Magee who played well. Bob Banham "was very nippy and quick to seize an opening" in the five eighths and he scored City's lone try. In their forwards a new recruit from rugby, William (Bill) Jackson, "was very prominent". In the Ponsonby forwards Frank Pickrang "gave a lesson in tactics to his team mates, keeping the ball at toe in effective loose rushes...".

2 July	Mount Albert	9-3 (0-0)	North Shore	Carlaw Park 1
3:00	Try: Bert Leatherbarrow 2, Martin Hansen		Try: George Zane-Zaninovich	Referee: Percy Rogers

2 July	Newton	16-2 (8-0)	Richmond	Carlaw Park 1
1:30	Try: Ted Brimble, Roy Taylor, W McKenzie, W Procter; Con: Fredrick Sissons 2		Pen: Frank Furnell	Referee: Maurice Wetherill

2 July	City	5-3 (5-0)	Ponsonby	Carlaw Park 2
3:00	Try: Bob Banham; Con: Jackie Rata		Try: Brian Riley	Referee: Stuart Billman

2 July	Marist	24-3	Manukau	Carlaw Park 2
1:30	Try: Jimmy Matthews 3, Billy Grotte 2, Bill Breed, Phil Donovan, Clive Murdoch		Try: Richard Shalfoon	Referee: Owen Chalmers

==== Round 13 ====
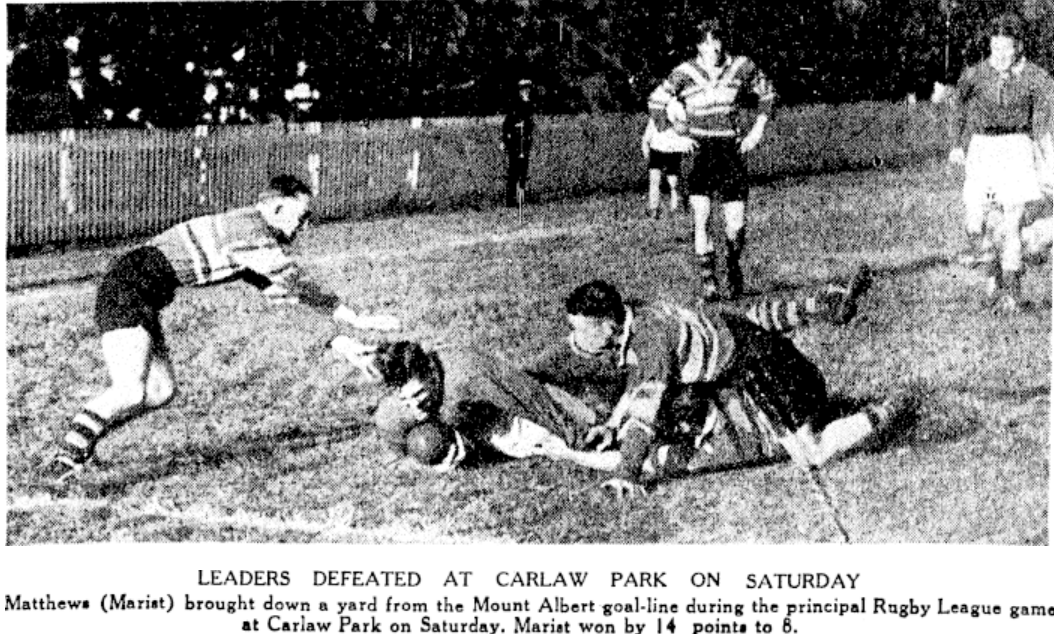
Jimmy Matthews of Marist tackled just short of the line.

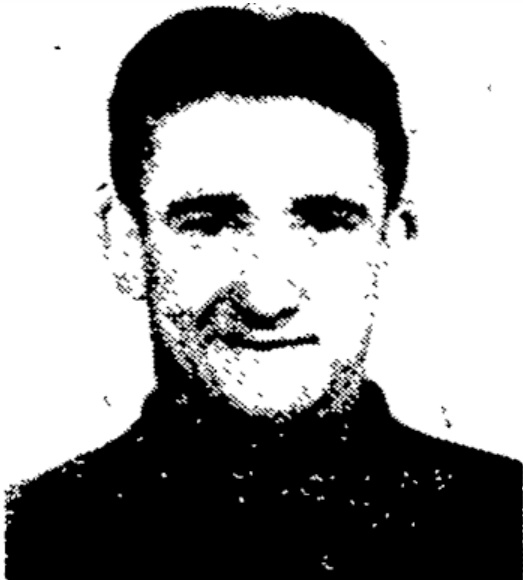
Noel Martin on debut for Ponsonby.

During the Mount Albert – Marist game, Mt Albert teammates Ray McInnarney and A. MacLachlan collided while trying to field a kick which allowed Marist to score a try giving them the lead. McInnarney had to leave the field with an injured leg as a result of the collision. He was the older brother of Arthur McInnarney with both transferring from Ellerslie earlier in the year. Arthur had joined ten works earlir while Ray joined the previous round. In the Richmond game with North Shore six players had to leave the field with injuries. North Shore had to play two short in the second half. Dick Smith and Verdun Scott were amongst those who had to go off, along with Powell. During the week Richmond lost the services of Frank Furnell who transferred to Wellington. He was replaced at fullback by Trevor Bramley. Noel Martin debuted for Ponsonby at fullback. He went on to play 15 games for them over 1938 and 1939 before enlisting in the war effort. He became a prisoner of war in Greece in mid 1941.

9 July	Marist	14-8	Mount Albert	Carlaw Park 1
3:00	Try: Ray Halsey, Joe Woods 2, Kenneth Finlayson; Con: Jimmy Chalmers		Try: Martin Hansen 2 Pen: A MacLachlan	Referee: Maurice Wetherill

9 July	Newton	13-9	City	Carlaw Park 1
1:30	Try: Roy Taylor 2, Ted Brimble; Pen: Fredrick Sissons 2		Try: Joseph Hapi; Pen: Jackie Rata 3	Referee: Jack Hawkes

9 July	Richmond	18-5	North Shore	Carlaw Park 2
3:00	Try: Alf Broadhead 2, Lyndsay Jack, Alan Watkins; Con: Trevor Bramley 2 Pen: Trevor Bramley		Try: Ross Jones; Con: Verdun Scott	Referee: Percy Rogers

9 July	Ponsonby	11-6	Papakura	Carlaw Park 2
1:30	Try: Brian Riley, Edgar Morgan, Pat Young; Con: W Dormer		Pen: J McInnes 3	Referee: A Kinnaird

==== Round 14 ====
23 July	Mount Albert	11-3	Richmond	Carlaw Park 1
3:00	Try: Jack Tristram, Dunn, Richard Shadbolt; Drop: H MacLachlan		Try: Merv Devine	Referee: Maurice Wetherill

23 July	Ponsonby	7-5	North Shore	Carlaw Park 1
1:30	Try: Pat Young; Con: Dan Schroeder; Pen: Dan Schroeder		Try: Bennetts; Con: Jack Smith	Referee: Owen Chalmers

23 July	Marist	8-0	Papakura	Carlaw Park 2
3:00	Try: John Anderson 2 Con: John Anderson			Referee: George Kelly

23 July	Manukau	18-4	City	Carlaw Park 2
1:30	Try: Jack Brodrick, George (Tiki) Whye, Freddie McGuire, Mihaka Panapa; Con: Jack Hemi 3		Pen: Jackie Rata 2	Referee: Roy Otto

==== Round 15 ====
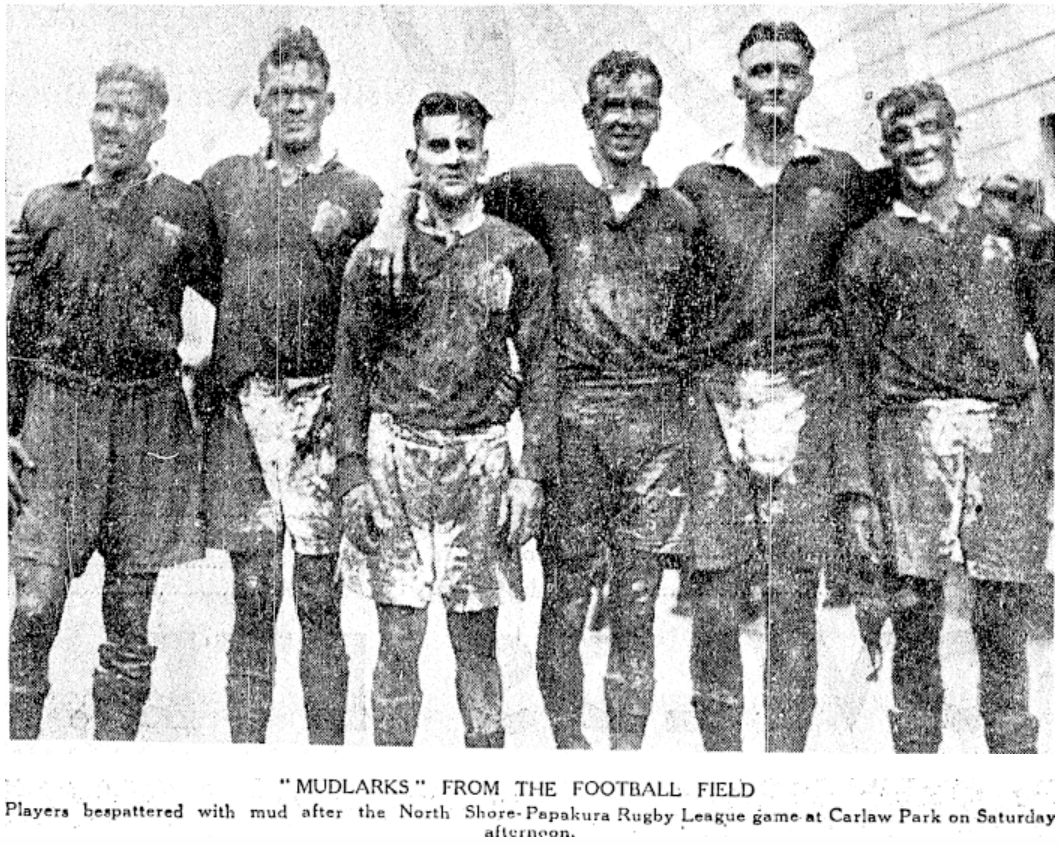
Papakura players after their game on the #2 field. Their captain, (lock) John Fogarty on the right.

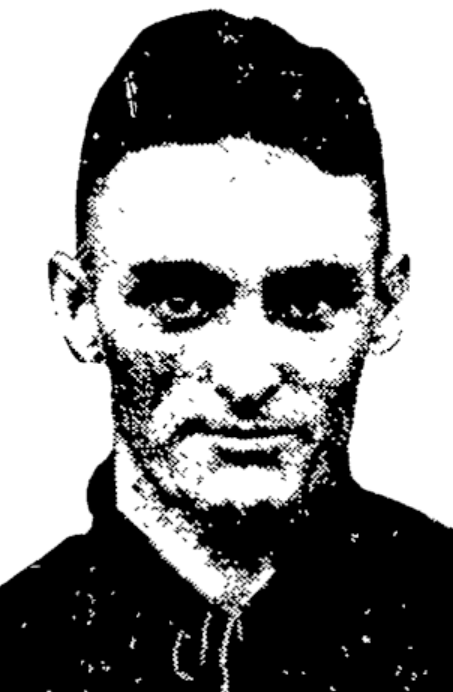
Ted Mincham refereed the North Shore v Papakura game after retiring from playing following round 8.

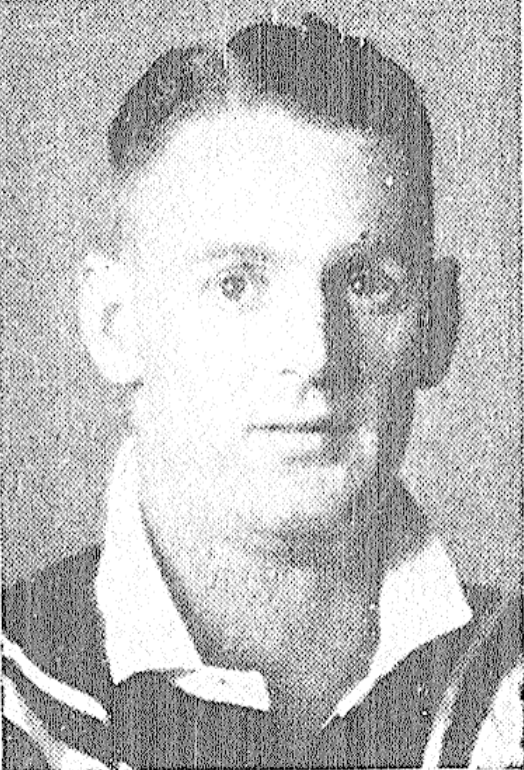
Laurie Mills, the Richmond winger who was concussed.

Laurie Mills (aged 20) was concussed in the Richmond – Manukau game and was taken to hospital. He would later be killed in action during World War 2. Alf Broadhead also went off injured for Richmond and was replaced by Hilton while Mills was replaced by Lyndsay Jack. His Richmond side drew 6-6 and were unlucky not to win as they outscored Manukau two tries to nil but Jack Hemi's fine goal kicking gave Manukau a draw. The ground was heavy due to the wet weather and the teams played brightly considering. In Newton's 7–3 win over Ponsonby their fullback, Claude Dempsey "played a fine game" turning defence into attack many times. All their points were scored by Frederick Sissons from a try, conversion, and penalty. For Ponsonby Jack Campbell at centre three-quarter "was easily the best" back, with "his handling being excellent". While in their forwards hooker Brown won most of the ball from the scrums and "played a splendid game in the loose and tackled well". In the Marist game with City, Bob Banham the City five eighth failed to return to the field after halftime due to injury, while Jackie Rata and Bill Jackson went off in the second half leaving them well short of players, and then J. Hutchinson also went off near the end. Marist went on to win 9–0. Robert Grotte who had returned from the New Zealand tour of Australia "played a heady game and was a tower of strength to his team" at halfback. In the North Shore v Papakura match the referee was Ted Mincham who had spent the first half of the season playing for Mount Albert seniors. He would however play senior football again for Richmond during the war years. The match was played on the number 2 field at Carlaw Park with there being "patches of sticky mud like a gluepot". Papakura's forwards played well but their backs were unable to beat North Shore's Verdun Scott, who was "too safe at fullback". Papakura rearranged their backline at halftime moving Cooke from fullback to second five eighths, and Wilson on the wing dropped back to the custodian position. Benny Crocker and E Cossey swapped places between halfback and first five eighth. The movements made almost no difference to their attack however. Ted Scott played well for North Shore at halfback giving Ivor Stirling and Jack Zane-Zaninovich good ball. Scott's brother Len struggled to handle in the conditions at centre. In the North Shore forwards Arthur Sowter and Ross Jones were hard-working and "particularly prominent in the loose". In the Papakura backs, Cooke was the best, being safe at fullback and then solid on defence when in the five eighths. As was often the case, Buckeridge, Lyndsay Evans, and John Fogarty were the best forwards for the losing side.

30 July	Manukau	6-6	Richmond	Carlaw Park 1
3:00	Pen: Jack Hemi 3		Try: Laurie Mills, George Tittleton	Referee: Maurice Wetherill

30 July	Newton	7-3	Ponsonby	Carlaw Park 1
1:30	Try: Fredrick Sissons; Con: Fredrick Sissons; Pen: Fredrick Sissons		Try: Wilfred Dormer	Referee: Roy Otto

30 July	Marist	9-0	City	Carlaw Park 2
3:00	Try: Clive Murdoch, John Anderson, Jimmy Matthews			Referee: A Kinnaird

30 July	North Shore	13-5	Papakura	Carlaw Park 2
1:30	Try: Len Scott, Trevor Hammill, McIntosh; Con: Verdun Scott 2		Try: Lindsay Evans; Pen: J McInnes	Referee: Ted Mincham

==== Round 16 ====
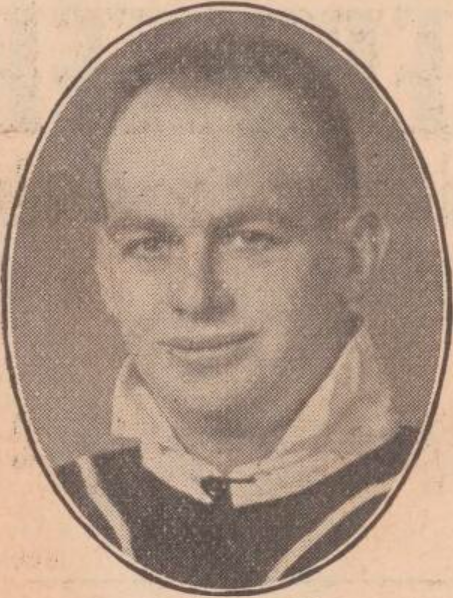
Gordon Midgley

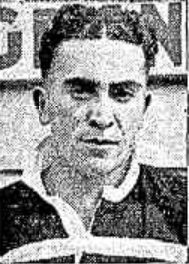
Rangi Chase, the Manukau centre who was the best back on the ground in their 31–5 win.

Gordon Midgley who had returned from New Zealand's tour of Australia weeks earlier scored four tries for Marist on the wing in their 32–4 win over Richmond. The win gave them a four-point lead over Mount Albert for the championship. Wally Tittleton was at centre and had a hard day due to Keith Fletcher at second five-eighth playing poorly with his passing often going into his opponents hands. Richmond only trailed 8–4 at halftime before collapsing in the second half. Marist forward, Joe Woods was the best "forward on the ground". Their captain however, John Anderson was said to be too selfish through holding on too long in possession when he had teammates in support. Richard Shadbolt was sent off for Mt Albert during the first half of their match with Manukau for alleged punching. A Manukau forward "attempted a strangle hold" on him in retaliation and Shadbolt "lay injured for some minutes" but the Manukau player went unpunished. It was decided during the management committee meeting later in the week that after reviewing the circumstances to take no further action. They also lost Dunn and A McLachlan through injuries meaning that for nearly 30 minutes they had to play with just 10 men. Rangi Chase was the "best back on the ground" and "changed direction with speed and used his speed to advantage". While Walter Brimble showed his best for since returning from Australia. In their forwards Angus Gault, Pita Ririnui, Jack Brodrick, and George Whye were the best.

6 August	Marist	32-4	Richmond	Carlaw Park 1
3:00	Try: Gordon Midgley 4, Joe Woods, John Anderson, Jimmy Chalmers, Robert Grotte; Con: John Anderson 4		Pen: Trevor Bramley 2	Referee: Percy Rogers

6 August	Manukau	31-5	Mount Albert	Carlaw Park 1
1:30	Try: Rangi Chase 3, Walter Brimble 2, George (Tiki) Whye, Angus Gault; Con: Jack Hemi 3 Pen: Jack Hemi; Drop: Jack Hemi		Try: Richard Shadbolt; Pen: Martin Hanson	Referee: Maurice Wetherill

6 August	North Shore	21-18	City	Carlaw Park 2
1:30	Try: Ross Jones 2, Hugh Simpson, Horace Hunt, Trevor Hammill; Con: Verdun Scott 3		Try: Bob Banham, Stanaway, Joseph Hapi, John Magee; Con: Stanaway, J Hutchinson; Pen: Stanaway	Referee: Frank Thompson

6 August	Newton	13-8	Papakura	Ellerslie Reserve
3:00	Try: Jones, Steve Watene, R McKenzie; Con: Fredrick Sissons 2		Try: Lindsay D Evans 2 Con: J McInnes	Referee: G Kelly

==== Round 17 ====
The Auckland match against Canterbury was played on the same day at Carlaw Park with the club matches providing the curtain-raisers. Richmond and Manukau did not play on the day and the Auckland team was made exclusively from their teams. In the match between Mount Albert and City, Jack Tristram and Bob Banham were ordered off from each team respectively after an incident between them.

13 August	Ponsonby	11-8	Marist	Carlaw Park 1
1:30	Try: Arthur Kay; Con: Frederick Schroeder; Pen: Frederick Schroeder 3		Try: Kenneth Finlayson 2 Pen: John Anderson	Referee: Maurice Wetherill

13 August	Mount Albert	28-13	City	Carlaw Park 2
3:00	Try: Wilson 2, Clarry McNeil 2, Jack Tristram, Bert Leatherbarrow; Con: Des Herring 3, Bert Leatherbarrow; Pen: Des Herring		Try: Bob Banham, John Magee, J Hutchinson; Pen: Jackie Rata; Drop: Jackie Rata	Referee: Percy Rogers

13 August	Newton	13-10	North Shore	Carlaw Park 2
1:30	Try: W Proctor, Donald McKenzie, Lawson; Con: Wilfred Brimble, Claude Dempsey		Try: Trevor Hammill, Bennetts; Con: Jack Smith; Pen: Jack Smith	Referee: Stuart Billman

==== Round 18 ====
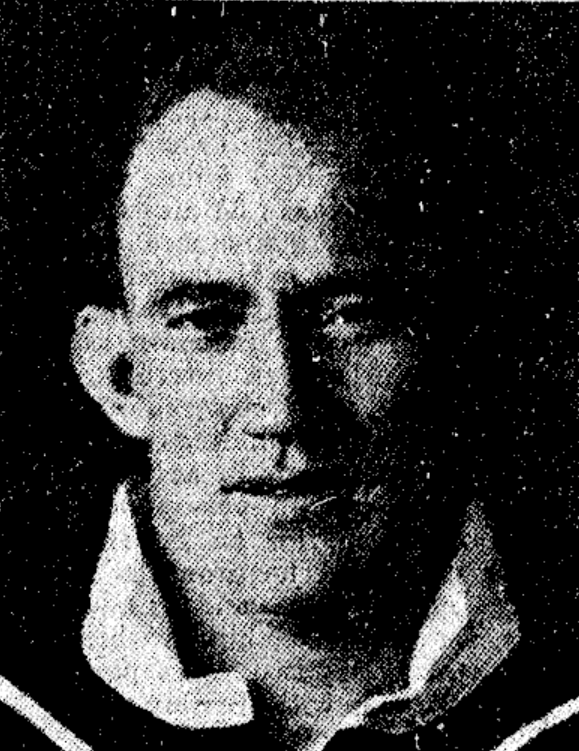
Des Herring

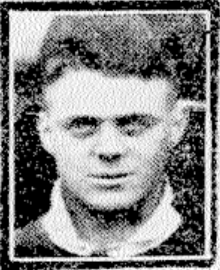
Roy Hardgrave, returned to play in New Zealand.

By virtue of their win over Newton, Marist claimed the Fox memorial title for 1938. It was a very hard-fought match with the scores tied 7–7 at halftime. Roy Hardgrave made an appearance for Mount Albert after recently returning to Auckland from his time playing professionally in England and France. He had played for Newton from 1924 to 1929, and briefly returned in 1934, playing five club games before moving back to England for another four seasons. He then finished his career with Mt Albert. He struggled a little but scored a try and showed that he still retained his speed despite now being 32 years old. In Mt Albert's 44–12 win over Papakura, their prop, Des Herring scored two tries, and kicked five conversions and a penalty for 18 points, a remarkable feat for a front row forward.

20 August	Manukau	26-14	Ponsonby	Carlaw Park 1
1:30	Try: Rangi Chase 2, Angus Gault 2, George Whye 2, W Pile, Jack Brodrick; Con: Joe Broughton		Try: Brian Riley 2, Clarrie Peterson, Carr; Con: Dan Schroeder	Referee: A Simpson

20 August	Marist	10-7	Newton	Carlaw Park 1
3:00	Try: John Bakalich, John Anderson; Con: John Anderson 2		Try: Bill McKenzie; Con: Fredrick Sissons; Pen: Fredrick Sissons	Referee: Maurice Wetherill

20 August	Richmond	24-10	City	Carlaw Park 2
1:30	Try: Keith Fletcher 3, Leo Davis 2, Wally Tittleton; Con: Trevor Bramley 2, L Williams		Try: Bob Banham 2 Pen: Doug Hutchinson	Referee: Frank Thompson

20 August	Mount Albert	44-12	Papakura	Carlaw Park 2
3:00	Try: Des Herring 2, Bert Leatherbarrow 2, Clarry McNeil 2, Joseph Gunning 2, Roy Hardgrave, Martin Hansen; Con: Des Herring 5, Bill Walker; Pen: Des Herring		Try: F Anderson, Lindsay Evans; Con: Benny Crocker, J Reid; Pen: W Cooke	Referee: Roy Otto

=== Roope Rooster (knockout competition) ===
==== Friendly match ====
North Shore and Papakura met at Prince Edward Park in a 'friendly match' which did not count towards the Roope Rooster competition. In the first half Horace Hunt scored for North Shore with Jack Smith adding a penalty. In the second half the Papakura halfback, Benny Crocker "made a fine run through to pass to [John] Fogarty who scored just before the final whistle. The conversion missed however and North Shore held on to win.

27 August	Papakura	3-5	North Shore	Prince Edward Park
3:00	Try: John Fogarty		Try: Horace Hunt; Pen: Jack Smith	Referee: C Knott

==== Round 1 ====
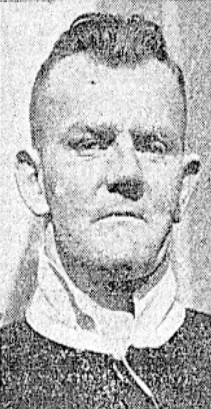
George Beadle, New Zealand prop in 1939 played an outstanding game for Huntly.

The Huntly team from the Waikato was permitted by the Auckland Rugby League to play in the Roope Rooster competition. Shaw, the Huntly fullback kicked excellently and his three penalties gave them a 6-0 lead before halftime. However Marist scored through Clive Murdoch when Phil Donovan and Jimmy Matthews broke away and Shaw slipped trying to recover their kick with Murdoch "racing up to score". Early in the second half George Beadle a Huntly forward who would go on to represent New Zealand at prop the following season raced away with Brooks, a South Auckland (Waikato) representative. He was killed in a mining accident in Huntly on July 1, 1944. Brooks kicked too hard and they missed scoring. Shortly after Reginald Haslam, the outstanding Marist centre cleared and Robert Grotte took play back to mid-field. Clive Murdoch then using his speed to score his second, with John Anderson converting it to give them the narrow win. For Marist their full back Bill Glover "played a find game" with his defence being "perfect and his fielding flawless, in spite of a greasy ball" while his opposite Shaw was excellent and their duel was a feature of the game. Haslam's excellent cover defence was said to have won Marist the game. For Huntly their lock, Beadle "was the best forward on the ground. He showed a lot of speed for a big man and it usually took three Marist forwards to pull him down". In the City v Marist game "dashing play in the City forwards, and the individualism of Bob Banham, the player coach, were features of the game. Joseph Hapi on the wing for City was the best of the three-quarters while behind the scrum the diminutive J. Hutchinson "did very well and stood up to a very grueling task". F Whittle, their five eighths in just his second game "was inclined to cut in too much, but should develop into a good player with more experience" after his move from rugby union. Bill Jackson "ably led the City pack and was the outstanding forward in the loose". For Mt Albert their fullback, McLachlan "played a sterling game and his splendid fielding gained much applause". While Joseph Gunning was the best of their forwards.

27 August	Marist	8-6 (3-6)	Huntly	Carlaw Park 1
3:00	Try: Clive Murdoch 2 Con: John Anderson		Pen: Shaw 3	Referee: Maurice Wetherill

27 August	City	8-2 (6-0)	Mount Albert	Carlaw Park 1
1:30	Try: F Whittle, John Magee; Pen: Bob Banham		Pen: Des Herring	Referee: Ted Mincham

==== Round 2 ====
In the match between North Shore and Marist, Hugh Simpson (North Shore), Ken Finlayson (Marist), and Joe Woods (Marist) were all sent from the field. Simpson was cautioned while Finlayson was severely reprimanded. Woods was unable to attend the judicial hearing and his consequences were to be dealt with later. In City's win over Newton their star five eighth Bob Banham was playing an outstanding game but injured his leg and rather than come off he moved out to the wing with Joseph Hapi switching places. Newton was missing Ted Brimble and Frederick Sissons through injury with Bill McKenzie and Hill filling their positions in the five eighths.

3 September	North Shore	8-2	Marist	Carlaw Park 1
3:00	Try: Ross Jones, Arthur Sowter; Con: Jack Smith		Pen: John Anderson	Referee: Roy Otto

3 September	Richmond	19-6	Ponsonby	Carlaw Park 1
1:30	Try: Leo Davis 2, Laurie Mills, Merv Devine, Maurice Potter; Con: Merv Devine, Trevor Bramley		Try: Pat Young 2	Referee: Frank Thompson

3 September	City	10-3	Newton	Carlaw Park 2
3:00	Try: J.A. Thompson, A Legge; Con: Bob Banham, J Hutchinson		Try: Joseph Ginders	Referee: Stuart Billman

3 September	Papakura	6-28	Manukau	Prince Edward Park
3:00	Try: Richard Burgess, Benny Crocker		Try: Tommy Chase 2, Joe Broughton, Jack Hemi, R Wilson, Freddie McGuire; Con: Jack Hemi 5	Referee: T Evans

==== Semi finals ====
10 September	Richmond	20-7	North Shore	Carlaw Park 1
1:30	Try: Merv Devine, Lyndsay Jack, Alf Broadhead, Jack McLeod 2, Wally Tittleton; Con: Alan Watkins		Try: G Brown; Pen: Jack Smith 2	Referee: Maurice Wetherill

10 September	City	16-8	Manukau	Carlaw Park 1
3:00	Try: Arnold Porteous, Stanaway 3 Con: Doug Hutchinson 2		Try: W Pile, Harry Zane-Zaninovich; Drop: Jack Hemi	Referee: Roy Otto

==== Final ====
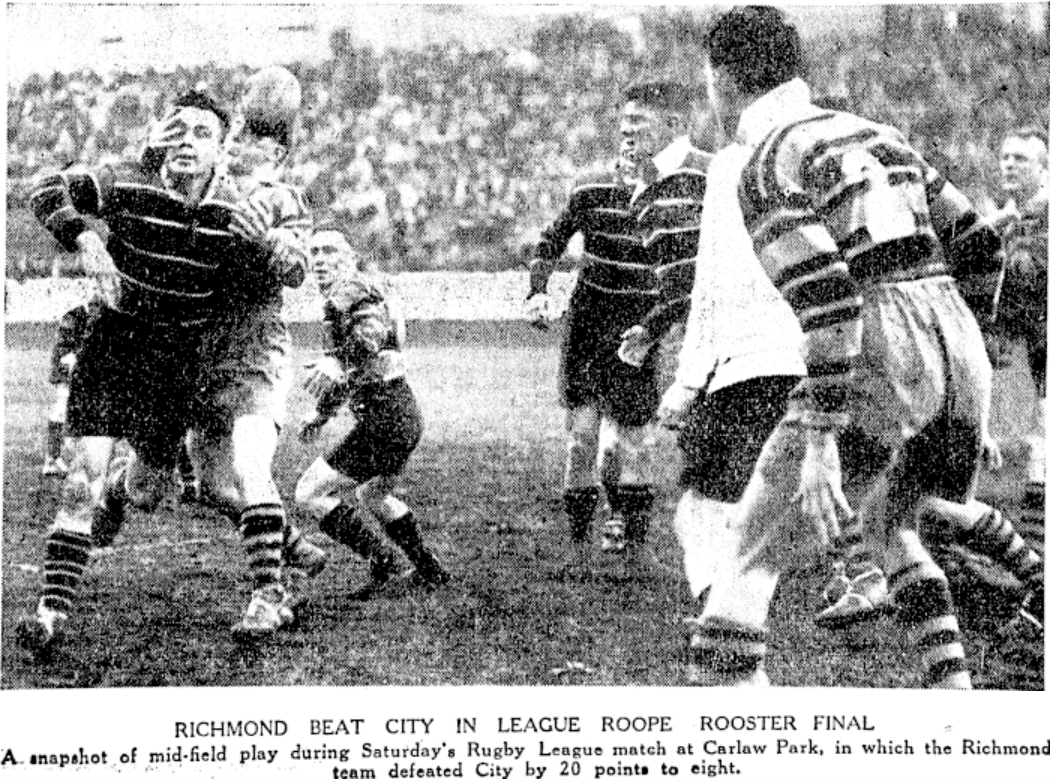

17 September	Richmond	20-8	City	Carlaw Park 1
3:00	Try: Laurie Mills, Alf Broadhead, Noel Bickerton, Jack Satherley; Con: Trevor Bramley 4		Try: Stanaway, J Hutchinson; Pen: J Hutchinson	Referee: Roy Otto

=== Phelan Shield ===
==== Round 1 ====
In the Mount Albert match with Marist, Joseph Gunning and Richard Shadbolt were both sent off for Mount Albert and William (Billy) Grotte was sent off for Marist. Jack Donovan refereed the Mt Albert v Marist game, with his brother Phil scoring a try for Marist in their 6–5 loss. Brothers Bill and Donald McKenzie each scored a try for Newton in their 20–15 loss to Ponsonby.

10 September	Ponsonby	20-15	Newton	Carlaw Park 2
1:30	Try: Clarrie Petersen, Arthur Kay, Conway, Rush; Con: Arthur Kay 2 Pen: Arthur Kay, Dan Schroeder		Try: Bill McKenzie, John Ginders, Donald McKenzie; Con: Hill; Pen: Hill; Drop: H Kendall	Referee: (V.) G Kelly

10 September	Mount Albert	6-5	Marist	Carlaw Park 2
3:00	Try: Martin Hansen, Des Herring		Try: Phil Donovan; Pen: John Anderson	Referee: Jack Donovan

10 September	Papakura	24-11	Huntly	Prince Edward Park
3:00	Try: J McInnes, Richard Burgess 2, W Cooke, W Walker 2, Evans; Con: J McInnes 2, W Cooke		Try: Moyes, Partis, Shaw; Con: Stevens	Referee: Owen Chalmers

==== Round 2 ====
In addition to the 2 Phelan Shield matches Marist played Ponsonby in a practice game on the No. 2 field as preparation for their match against the touring Eastern Suburbs side, while Ponsonby was still in the Phelan Shield and preparing for their semi-final match. Marist won 20 points to 14. Robert Marshall, the wicket keeper for the Auckland representative cricket side, scored a try in Mt Albert's loss to Manukau.

17 September	Papakura	16-12	North Shore	Carlaw Park 1
1:30	Try: W Reeves 2, John Fogarty, J McInnes; Con: J McInnes; Pen: J McInnes		Try: G Brown 2 Con: Jack Smith 2 Pen: Jack Smith	Referee: T Evans

17 September	Manukau	26-17	Mount Albert	Carlaw Park 2
3:00	Try: Jack Broughton 2, Jack Brodrick, W Pile, Freddie McGuire, Pita Ririnui; Con: Jack Hemi 3, Jack Broughton		Try: Bert Leatherbarrow, Robert Marshall, Joseph Gunning; Con: Des Herring 3 Pen: Des Herring	Referee: G Kelly

==== Semi final ====
24 September	Manukau	26-8	Ponsonby	Carlaw Park 1
1:30	Try: Jack Brodrick 2, Jack Broughton 2, Pita Ririnui, Harry Zane-Zaninovich; Con: Tommy Chase 3 Pen: Tommy Chase		Try: Clarrie Petersen, Roy Nurse; Pen: Arthur Kay	Referee: G Kelly

==== Final ====
1 October	Manukau	18-8	Papakura	Carlaw Park 1
1:30	Try: Mihaka Panapa 2, R Wilson, Harry Zane-Zaninovich; Con: Tommy Chase 2 Pen: Tommy Chase		Try: Gordon Wilson, John Fogarty; Pen: J McInnes	Attendance: 11,000; Referee: Ted Mincham

=== Stormont Shield (champion of champions) ===
During the match 21 year old Maurice Potter of the Richmond side was concussed and taken to hospital. It was initially reported that his condition was not serious but it was found that he suffered a broken jaw. Trevor Bramley, the Richmond fullback suffered a dislocated elbow and had to be treated by the St John Ambulance officer. He was replaced by Frank Furnell who had returned from Wellington and had played brilliantly for Richmond in the same position earlier in the season.

8 October	Richmond	9-8	Marist	Carlaw Park 1
3:00	Try: Merv Devine, Wally Tittleton, Leo Davis		Try: Gordon Midgley, John Anderson; Con: John Anderson	Referee: Percy Rogers

=== Top try scorers and point scorers ===
The point scoring lists are compiled from matches played in the Fox Memorial, Roope Rooster, Phelan Shield and Stormont Shield matches which all first grade sides were eligible for competing in (provided they avoided elimination from the knock out competitions). The top point scorer for the third consecutive season was John Anderson with 93. J McInnnes (Papakura) was 9 behind with 84, Jack Hemi scored 76, while Jack Smith had 68, all from goal kicks. Anderson, Hemi, and Smith all went on the New Zealand tour of Australia mid-season which meant they missed 6 Fox Memorial games so their point totals were significantly below what they would have been. Mount Albert hooker Bert Leatherbarrow and loose forward Martin Hansen were the top try scorers with 11 along with Marist's winger Gordon Midgley and loose forward John Anderson.

Top try scorers
Rk	Player	Team	Games	Tries
1=	John Anderson	Marist	17	11
1=	Bert Leatherbarrow	Mt Albert	19	11
1=	Martin Hansen	Mt Albert	18	11
1=	Gordon Midgley	Marist	16	11
5=	Alf Broadhead	Richmond	17	10
5=	Brian Riley	Ponsonby	16	10
7=	Jack Brodrick	Manukau	14	9
7=	William (Bill) McKenzie	Newton	18	9
7=	R Wilson	Manukau	16	9
10=	Merv Devine	Richmond	19	8
10=	Clarry McNeil	Mt Albert	13	8
10=	Laurie Mills	Richmond	17	8
10=	Roy Taylor	Newton	11	8
10=	Pat Young	Ponsonby	16	8

Top point scorers
Rk	Player	Team	G	T	C	P	DG	Pts
1	John Anderson	Marist	17	11	21	9	0	93
2	J McInnes	Papakura	18	4	13	23	0	84
3	Jack Hemi	Manukau	11	2	26	7	2	76
4	Jack Smith	North Shore	13	0	17	17	0	68
5	Frank Furnell	Richmond	13	1	22	9	0	65
6	Tommy Chase	Manukau	20	5	12	9	1	59
7=	Des Herring	Mt Albert	14	7	11	6	0	55
7=	Jackie Rata	City	18	1	6	19	1	55
9	J Hutchinson	City	21	3	14	4	0	45
10	Ted Mincham	Mt Albert	8	3	10	6	0	41

== Senior reserve competitions ==
The early round results were not reported while several later rounds also only had sporadic reporting. Richmond and Mount Albert were tied after 18 rounds necessitating a final between the two teams which Richmond won by 16 points to 10.

=== Norton Cup standings ===
Team	Pld	W	D	L	F	A	Pts
Richmond Rovers reserves	16	14	1	1	302	66	29
Mount Albert United reserves	16	14	1	1	416	66	29
Marist Old Boys reserves	13	9	0	4	141	107	18
Newton Rangers reserves	15	6	1	8	132	164	13
Ponsonby United reserves	11	5	0	6	108	97	10
North Shore Albions reserves	12	5	0	7	81	101	10
Papakura reserves	12	2	1	9	72	158	5
City Rovers reserves	10	2	0	8	90	204	4
Manukau reserves	13	0	0	13	49	307	0

=== Norton Cup results ===
In the opening round match between Mount Albert and Ponsonby at Grey Lynn, Norman Drew fractured his ankle.

	Date		Score		Score	Referee	Venue
Round 1	9 April	Marist	?	North Shore	?	O Chalmers	Grey Lynn Park, 3pm
-	9 April	Mount Albert	W	Ponsonby	L	E Kelly	Grey Lynn Park, 1:30
-	9 April	Manukau	L	Newton	W	E Butt	Stadium, 3pm
-	9 April	Richmond	18	Papakura	2	H Tate	Stadium, 3pm
Round 2	16 April	Mount Albert	W	Newton	L	A Pearson	Grey Lynn Park, 3pm
-	16 April	Ponsonby	L	Richmond	W	G Barnhill	Grey Lynn Park, 1:30
-	16 April	Papakura	?	City	?	A Lennie	Western Springs, 3pm
-	16 April	North Shore	?	Manukau	?	H Tate	Western Springs, 1:30
Round 3	23 April	North Shore	L	Mount Albert	W	H Tate	Auckland Domain 5, 1:30
-	23 April	Marist	W	Manukau	L	G Kelly	Auckland Domain 5, 1:30
-	23 April	City	?	Ponsonby	?	A Kinnaird	Auckland Domain 6, 3pm
-	23 April	Newton	L	Richmond	W	T McIntosh	Auckland Domain 6, 1:30
Round 4	30 April	Marist	12	Mount Albert	3	K McIver	Auckland Domain, 3pm
-	30 April	Ponsonby	13	Papakura	0	W Skelton	Auckland Domain, 3pm
-	30 April	Richmond	12	North Shore	4	J Gedye	Auckland Domain, 1:30
-	30 April	Newton	37	City	25	G Barnhill	Auckland Domain, 1:30
Round 5	7 May	Richmond	14	Marist	0	C Knott	Auckland Domain 1, 3pm
-	7 May	Mount Albert	39	Manukau	3	A Otto	Auckland Domain 1, 1:30
-	7 May	North Shore	16	City	10	O Chalmers	Auckland Domain 5, 3pm
-	7 May	Newton	8	Papakura	7	A Pearson	Auckland Domain 5, 1:30
Round 6	14 May	Richmond	52	Manukau	7	Jack Hawkes	Auckland Domain 2, 1:30
-	14 May	Newton	15	Ponsonby	3	T McIntosh	Auckland Domain 2, 3pm
-	14 May	Marist	27	City	3	Stuart Billman	Auckland Domain 6, 1:30
-	14 May	North Shore	7	Papakura	6	A Simpson	Auckland Domain 6, 3pm
Round 7	28 May	North Shore	5	Ponsonby	10	N McIntosh	Devonport Domain, 1:30
-	28 May	City	14	Manukau	13	Percy Rogers	Auckland Domain 1, 3pm
-	28 May	Mount Albert	20	Richmond	8	Frank Thompson	Auckland Domain 1, 1:30
-	28 May	Marist	11	Papakura	2	K McIvor	Carlaw Park 2, 1:30
Round 8	4 June	Marist	26	Ponsonby	8	Ralph Otto	Auckland Domain 1, 1:30
-	4 June	Newton	5	North Shore	3	A Simpson	Auckland Domain 3, 3pm
-	4 June	Mount Albert	22	City	8	G Barnhill	Auckland Domain 5, 1:45
-	4 June	Papakura	18	Manukau	0	Roy Otto	Auckland Domain 5, 3pm
Round 9	11 June	Ponsonby	11	Manukau	5	Ralph Otto	Auckland Domain 1, 1:30
-	11 June	Marist	2	Newton	0	J Gedye	Auckland Domain 1, 1:30
-	11 June	Richmond	32	City	2	O Chalmers	Auckland Domain 6, 1:30
-	11 June	Mount Albert	25	Papakura	5	A Pearson	Auckland Domain 6, 1:30
Round 10	18 June	North Shore	5	Marist	2	Stuart Billman	Carlaw Park 2, 1:30
-	18 June	Newton	27	Manukau	0	A Simpson	Auckland Domain 1, 3pm
-	18 June	Mount Albert	20	Ponsonby	11	J Cottingham	Auckland Domain 1, 1:30
-	18 June	Richmond	24	Papakura	3	E Butt	Prince Edward Park, 1:30
Round 11	25 June	Mount Albert	32	Newton	5	A Kinnaird	Auckland Domain 2, 3pm
-	25 June	Richmond	11	Ponsonby	7	Jack Donovan	Auckland Domain 2, 1:30
-	25 June	Papakura	13	City	3	A Lennie	Auckland Domain 6, 3pm
-	25 June	North Shore	22	Manukau	0	T Evans	Auckland Domain 6, 1:30
Round 12	2 July	Richmond	27	Newton	7	G Kelly	Auckland Domain 1, 3pm
-	2 July	North Shore	L	Mount Albert	W	C Boneham	Auckland Domain 1, 1:30
-	2 July	Marist	19	Manukau	2	H Tate	Auckland Domain 5, 3pm
-	2 July	City	?	Ponsonby	?	A Farrell	Auckland Domain 5, 1:30
Round 13	9 July	City	?	Newton	?	G Kelly	Auckland Domain, 3pm
-	9 July	Mount Albert	29	Marist	11	Roy Otto	Auckland Domain, 1:30
-	9 July	Papakura	?	Ponsonby	?	O Chalmers	Auckland Domain, 3pm
-	9 July	Richmond	36	North Shore	0	T Evans	Auckland Domain, 1:30
Round 14	23 July	North Shore	?	Ponsonby	?	Jack Hawkes	Auckland Domain 2, 3pm
-	23 July	Mount Albert	0	Richmond	0	H Tate	Auckland Domain 2, 1:30
-	23 July	Manukau	?	City	?	A Farrell	Auckland Domain 6, 3pm
-	23 July	Papakura	?	Marist	?	Ted Mincham	Auckland Domain 6, 1:30
Round 15	30 July	Ponsonby	15	Newton	2	G Kelly	Auckland Domain 1, 3pm
-	30 July	Richmond	23	Manukau	6	Stuart Billman	Victoria Park, 3pm
-	30 July	North Shore	7	Papakura	6	O Chalmers	Auckland Domain, 3pm
-	30 July	Marist	13	City	3	Jack Hawkes	Auckland Domain, 1:30
Round 16	6 August	Mount Albert	52	Manukau	0	T Evans	Auckland Domain 2, 3pm
-	6 August	Richmond	26	Marist	0	J Cottingham	Auckland Domain 2, 1:30
-	6 August	City	14	North Shore	12	C Boneham	Auckland Domain 6, 3pm
-	6 August	Papakura	8	Newton	8	J Gedye	Ellerslie Reserve, 1:45
Round 17	13 August	Ponsonby	?	Marist	?	G Kelly	Auckland Domain, 3pm
-	13 August	Manukau	?	Papakura	?	A Lennie	Auckland Domain, 1:30
-	13 August	North Shore	?	Newton	?	H Tate	Auckland Domain, 3pm
-	13 August	Mount Albert	24	City	6	A Pearson	Auckland Domain, 1:30
Round 18	20 August	Marist	18	Newton	12	A Kinnaird	Auckland Domain 1, 1:30
-	20 August	Ponsonby	30	Manukau	13	A Farrell	Auckland Domain 1, 3pm
-	20 August	Mount Albert	34	Papakura	2	T Evans	Auckland Domain 5, 1:30
-	20 August	Richmond	19	City	8	E Butt	Auckland Domain 5, 3pm

==== Senior reserve final ====
27 August	Richmond	16-10	Mount Albert	Carlaw Park 2
3:00	Try: Hilton, Graham 2, Williams; Con: George Tittleton 2		Try: Callinan, Collins; Con: Renton; Pen: Renton	Referee: T Evans

=== Stallard Cup (knockout competition) ===
Stallard Cup results
	Date		Score		Score	Referee	Venue
Round 1	3 September	Mount Albert	40	Papakura	4	D Chalmers	Auckland Domain 2, 3pm
-	3 September	Marist	W	North Shore	L	Stuart Billman	Auckland Domain 2, 1:30
-	3 September	Richmond	W	Newton	L	J Jones	Auckland Domain 6, 3pm
-	3 September	City	W	Manukau	L	E Pope	Auckland Domain 6, 1:30
Round 2	10 September	Ponsonby	?	Richmond	?	A Farrell	Auckland Domain, 3pm
-	10 September	Marist	W	City	L	A Pearson	Outer Domain, 1:30
-	10 September	Mount Albert	W	Kensington (Whangarei)	L	Jack Hawkes	Outer Domain, 1:30
Semi final	17 September	Marist	5	Mount Albert	2	O Chalmers	Outer Domain, 3pm
Semi final	17 September	Richmond	W	Ponsonby	L	Ted Mincham	Outer Domain, 1:30
Final	24 September	Richmond	18	Marist	7	O Chalmers	Carlaw Park 2, 1:30

== Senior B grade competitions ==
=== Sharman Cup standings ===
Team	Pld	W	D	L	F	A	Pts
Otahuhu senior B	12	9	1	2	85	61	19
Green Lane senior B	11	7	0	4	88	48	14
Ellerslie United senior B	12	5	2	5	114	59	12
Point Chevalier senior B	12	3	1	8	52	79	7
Northcote & Birkenhead Ramblers senior B	11	3	0	8	62	66	4
R.V. senior B	12	1	0	11	34	122	2

=== Sharman Cup results ===
The round 1 match between Otahuhu and Point Chevalier at Walker Park was called off by the referee with Otahuhu in the lead by 25 points to 13. The match was awarded to Otahuhu with Point Chevalier's approval. Earlier in the season the Point Chevalier club had seen floodlights added to its ground at Walker Park for the first time. Manukau entered a team after round 1 but they defaulted their round 2 match against Ellerslie (this match was then removed from the records) and then withdrew from the competition.

Otahuhu won the competition and their final round match was against Green Lane (who finished runner up) at Carlaw Park on July 16. The match was a curtain-raiser to the Auckland – New Zealand match. Not all of the results were reported in the newspapers however at the conclusion of the competition the Auckland Star reported that the teams finished on the following competition points: Otahuhu 19, Green Lane 14, Ellerslie 12, Point Chevalier 7, Northcote 6, R.V. 2.

	Date		Score		Score	Referee	Venue
Round 1	30 April	Ellerslie	17	Northcote	5	C Knott	Ellerslie Reserve, 3pm
-	30 April	Point Chevalier	13	Otahuhu	25	E Longville	Walker Park, 3pm
-	30 April	Green Lane	13	R.V.	0	A Pearson	Green Lane, 3pm
Round 2	7 May	Green Lane	13	Northcote	11	Ernest Korn	Victoria Park, 3pm
-	7 May	Point Chevalier	15	R.V.	0	A Lennie	Walker Park, 3pm
Round 3	14 May	Otahuhu	15	Ellerslie	15	O Chalmers	Otahuhu, 3pm
-	14 May	Green Lane	15	Point Chevalier	5	G Kelly	Green Lane, 3pm
-	14 May	Northcote	27	R.V.	5	Doncaster	Stafford Park, 3pm
Round 4	21 May	Ellerslie	28	R.V.	4	T Evans	Auckland Domain 2, 3pm
-	21 May	Point Chevalier	7	Northcote	6	H Tate	Walker Park, 3pm
-	21 May	Otahuhu	W	Green Lane	L	G Kelly	Otahuhu, 3pm
Round 5	28 May	Otahuhu	16	R.V.	12	Stuart Billman	Victoria Park, 3pm
-	28 May	Ellerslie	25	Point Chevalier	5	O Chalmers	Ellerslie Reserve, 3pm
Round 6	4 June	Green Lane	?	Ellerslie	?	Percy Rogers	Green Lane, 3pm
-	4 June	Otahuhu	?	Northcote	?	Maurice Wetherill	Otahuhu, 3pm
Round 7	6 June	Otahuhu	24	Ellerslie	9	A Simpson	Carlaw Park 1, 1:45
Round 8	11 June	Northcote	2	Ellerslie	5	A Simpson	Stafford Park, 3pm
-	11 June	Otahuhu	?	Point Chevalier	?	D McIntosh	Otahuhu 3pm
-	11 June	R.V.	9	Green Lane	8	Stuart Billman	Victoria Park, 3pm
Round 9	18 June	Point Chevalier	D	Ellerslie	D	Roy Otto	Walker Park, 3pm
-	18 June	Green Lane	19	Northcote	11	T Evans	Green Lane, 3pm
-	18 June	Otahuhu	W	R.V.	L	O Chalmers	Otahuhu, 3pm
Round 10	25 June	Ellerslie	?	Otahuhu	?	Percy Rogers	Ellerslie Reserve, 3pm
-	25 June	Northcote	W	R.V.	L	Roy Otto	Victoria Park 2, 3pm
-	25 June	Point Chevalier	7	Green Lane	8	Maurice Wetherill	Walker Park, 3pm
Round 11	2 July	Ellerslie	15	R.V.	4	T Evans	Victoria Park 2, 3pm
-	2 July	Northcote	?	Point Chevalier	?	Ernest Korn	Outer Domain, 3:15
-	2 July	Green Lane	L	Otahuhu	W	A Kinnaird	Green Lane, 3pm
Round 12	9 July	Ellerslie	?	Green Lane	?	Stuart Billman	Ellerslie Reserve, 3pm
-	9 July	Northcote	?	Otahuhu	?	A Pearson	Stafford Park, 3pm
-	9 July	Point Chevalier	W	R.V.	L	A Simpson	Outer Domain, 3pm
Round 13	16 July	Green Lane	12	Otahuhu	5	?	Carlaw Park 1, 1:30
-	16 July	Ellerslie	?	R.V.	?	Ted Mincham	Auckland Domain 5, 3pm
-	16 July	Point Chevalier	?	Northcote	?	J Cottingham	Walker Park, 3pm

=== Walmsley Shield (knockout competition) ===
Due to the amount of time left in the season following the conclusion of the Sharman Cup it was decided to play a full home and away competition for the Walmsley Shield. Very few results were reported and Point Chevalier dropped out of the competition after round 6. Ellerslie won the competition.

	Date		Score		Score	Referee	Venue
Round 1	23 July	Northcote	?	Ellerslie	?	Jack Donovan	Stafford Park, 3pm
-	23 July	Otahuhu	27	Point Chevalier	3	S Billman	Otahuhu, 3pm
-	23 July	Green Lane	?	R.V.	?	W Skelton	Green Lane, 3pm
Round 2	30 July	Otahuhu	12	Ellerslie	5	J Cottingham	Green Lane, 3pm
-	30 July	Northcote	?	R.V.	?	C Knott	Victoria Park, 3:15
-	30 July	Point Chevalier	LBD	Green Lane	WBD	Frank Thompson	Walker Park, 3pm
Round 3	6 August	Point Chevalier	3	Ellerslie	16	O Chalmers	Walker park, 3pm
-	6 August	Northcote	10	Green Lane	0	C Knott	Stafford Park, 3pm
-	6 August	Otahuhu	32	R.V.	0	E Butt	Otahuhu, 3pm
Round 4	13 August	Green Lane	20	Ellerslie	5	T Evans	Green Lane, 3pm
-	13 August	Otahuhu	?	Northcote	?	Jack Donovan	Otahuhu, 3pm
-	13 August	Point Chevalier	?	R.V.	?	J Jones	Victoria Park, 3pm
Round 5	20 August	Ellerslie	?	R.V.	?	J Cottingham	Ellerslie Reserve, 3pm
-	20 August	Otahuhu	?	Green Lane	?	A Linnie	Otahuhu, 3pm
Round 6	27 August	Point Chevalier	LBD	Otahuhu	WBD	Percy Rogers	Walker Park, 3pm
-	27 August	Green Lane	?	R.V.	?	J Cottingham	Auckland Domain 5, 3pm
-	27 August	Ellerslie	?	Northcote	?	Jack Donovan	Green Lane, 3pm
Round 7	3 September	Ellerslie	?	Green Lane	?	A Farrell	Ellerslie Reserve, 3pm
-	3 September	Northcote	?	Otahuhu	?	Ted Mincham	Stafford Park, 3pm
Round 8	10 September	Otahuhu	5	Ellerslie	10	E Pope	Otahuhu, 3:15
-	10 September	Green Lane	?	Northcote	?	C Knott	Green Lane, 3pm
Round 9	17 September	Ellerslie	W	Northcote	L	Frank Thompson	Ellerslie Reserve, 3pm
-	17 September	Otahuhu	?	R.V.	?	J Gedye	Grey Lynn Park, 3pm

== Other club matches ==
=== Manukau v South Auckland XIII ===
In a preseason match Manukau played a South Auckland XIII at Waikaraka Park in Onehunga. Neither George Nepia or Jack Hemi played in the match but Manukau won a "fast and interesting contest". Cecil McKinley, the former Poverty Bay rugby representative scored three tries for Manukau. He only played three games for them however before moving to the North Shore rugby union club and near the end of the season back to Poverty Bay.

26 March	Manukau	32-6	South Auckland XIII	Waikaraka Park
3:00	Try: George Whye, Tommy Chase, Peter Mahima, Cecil McKinley 3, R Wilson, Jack Brodrick; Con: Tommy Chase 4		Try: Stevens, Norman Hall

=== Canterbury Club XIII v Newton ===
23 July	Canterbury Club XIII	16-16	Newton	Monica Park
2:45	Try: W Guy 2, Len Brown, B Barnard; Pen: W Guy, W Bonniface		Try: Wilfred Brimble, Bob Banham, Claude Dempsey, John Ginders; Con: Fredrick Sissons 2	Attendance: 5,000

=== Bay of Plenty v Mount Albert ===
The coach of Mount Albert, Stan Prentice came out of retirement to play in the match. There were no scoring details published aside from a try to Clarry McNeil which was converted by McLaughlin. The match was played after two days of heavy rain but the conditions on game day were "generally good". The standouts for Mt Albert were Clarry McNeil, Arthur McInnarney, McLachlan, Joseph Gunning, Jack Tristram, and Martin Hansen.

30 July	Bay of Plenty	9-29	Mount Albert	Rotorua
2:45	Try: Unknown scoring		Try: Clarry McNeil +unknown scoring Con: McLachlan	Referee: Percy Rogers

=== Huntly v Ponsonby ===
6 August	Huntly	8-17	Ponsonby	Davies Park, Huntly
3:00	Try: Harlock, Howe; Con: Dowell		Try: Jack Campbell 2, Brian Riley, Clarrie Petersen, Pat Young; Con: Jack Campbell

=== Newton v Canterbury ===
17 August	Newton	22-12	Canterbury	Carlaw Park 1
3:00	Try: Bob Banham 3, Bill McKenzie 2, Alex Nathan; Con: Bob Banham; Pen: Wilfred Brimble		Try: Clark, Price; Con: Ces Davison; Pen: W Guy, Ces Davison	Referee: Stuart Billman

=== ARL Referees Association v South Auckland Referees Association (Kiwi Cup) ===
20 August	South Auckland Referees Association	11-9	Auckland Referees Association	Davies Park, Huntly
3:00	Try: J Wilson 2, Hayward; Con: Skelton		Try: Roy Otto, Maurice Wetherill, A Lennie

=== Whangarei v North Shore ===
20 August	Whangarei Combined	0-33	North Shore	Jubilee Park, Whangarei
3:00			Try: Ross Jones 2, Ivor Stirling 2, Hugh Simpson, McIntosh, Ted Scott; Con: Jack Smith 5 Pen: Jack Smith	Referee: H Bowyer

== Lower Grades ==
Richmond won the Davis Shield for the most championship points in all grades which they had won for several consecutive years, while Otahuhu won the Tracy Inglis trophy for most points in the junior grades. It was noted by the chairman of the schools’ committee, Mr. A.E. Stanley at the end of the season at the final control board meeting that "eight years ago there were seven school teams in Auckland, while in the season just closed there were 41 teams in the three grades".

Schoolboys A schoolboy gala was held at Carlaw Park on 22 October. Competing teams in the 7-a-side tournament were St. Patricks, George Court's (2), Ellerslie (2), Richmond, Ponsonby, Green Lane, Point Chevalier, Balmoral, Northcote, Manukau, Newton, Glenora, and Marist. The team from Ponsonby won the knockout competition when they defeated Ellerslie in the final. Ponsonby were presented with the Robert Reid Memorial Shield for winning the championship during the year, and the Wilson trophy for their knockout tournament win. The most improved 7-a-side player was named as J. Stackpole from Newton. The J. Gedye Cup went to S. Callagher of Richmond, while D. White of Ponsonby won the Don Cleverley Medal. The Marist team was presented with medals by Mr. C.L.M. Green, while J. Scott of the North Shore side was presented with the Sam Dickie Cup for goalkicking in the intermediate grade.

The results shown in the tables are based on scores reported in the New Zealand Herald, Auckland Star and Franklin Times so are very incomplete as many clubs did not submit results.

=== 3rd Grade ===
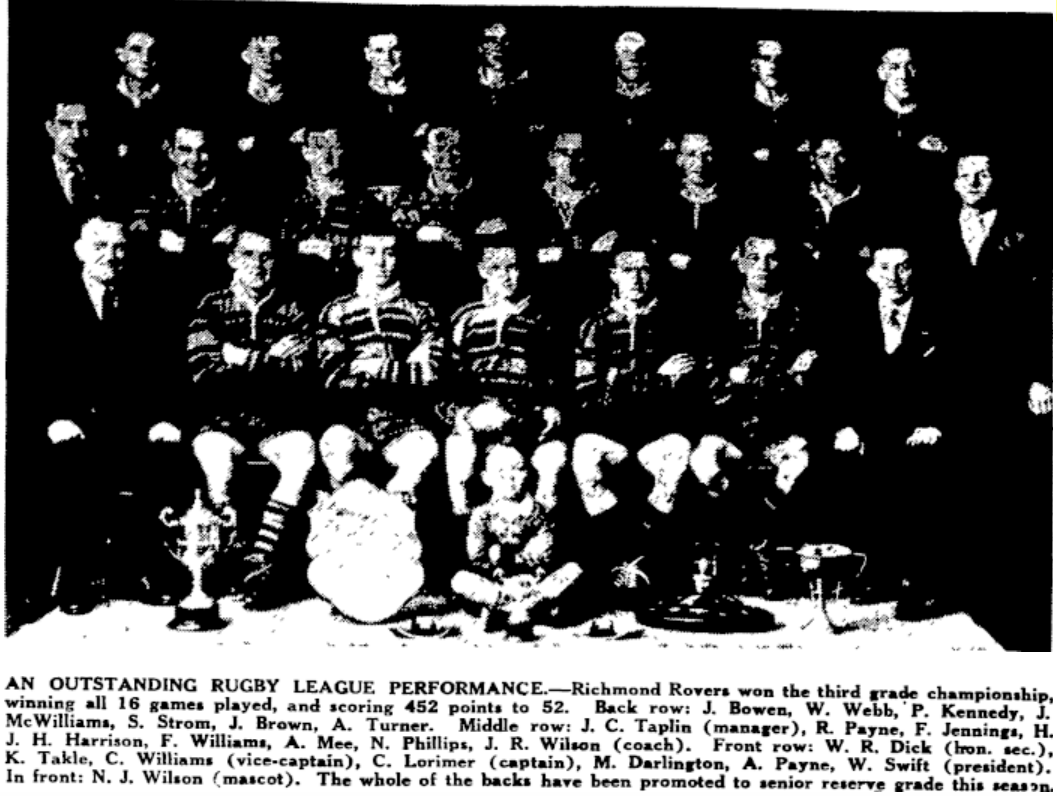

The 3rd Grade was split into 2 sections due to the number of teams. North Shore won section 1 and Richmond won section 2. Both teams played a home and away series to decide the overall 3rd grade champion with Richmond winning the first match 8-2 and the second match 8–3 to take the title on August 6 and August 13 respectively. Northcote and Richmond met in the final of the knockout competition on September 10 but the result was not reported in the newspapers. Ultimately Richmond finished the season winning 16 from 16 including their knockout matches, scoring 452 points and conceding just 52.

==== Section 1 ====
Team	Pld	W	D	L	F	A	Pts
North Shore Albions	16	7	1	2	155	31	15
Otahuhu Rovers	14	6	1	3	188	43	13
Marist Old Boys	14	5	2	1	108	33	12
Papakura	14	5	1	2	88	77	11
Ellerslie United	14	3	3	4	74	74	9
Mount Albert United	14	3	0	6	70	100	6
City Rovers	14	2	0	9	37	259	4
Manukau	14	1	1	7	33	148	3

==== Section 2 ====
Team	Pld	W	D	L	F	A	Pts
Richmond Rovers	14	14	0	0	452	52	28
RV	13	6	0	3	63	53	12
Ponsonby United	12	4	0	5	53	92	8
Northcote & Birkenhead Ramblers	11	2	0	3	38	68	4
Avondale	12	2	0	5	32	89	4
Point Chevalier	12	1	0	4	34	59	2
Glenora	12	0	0	7	29	89	0

=== 4th Grade (Hospital Cup) ===
It was decided to substitute the Hospital Cup for the fourth grade championship with the George Gillett Cup which had been presented to the league by George A. Gillett earlier in the season. City won the championship. Otahuhu won the knockout competition with an 11–7 win on September 10 over City. It was unclear when the knockout competition began as all teams continued to play matches until the end of the season.

Team	Pld	W	D	L	F	A	Pts
City Rovers	18	12	0	2	300	38	24
Richmond Rovers	18	11	0	2	226	49	22
Papakura	18	8	0	5	128	101	16
Otahuhu Rovers	19	6	0	4	131	45	12
RV	18	5	2	6	112	90	12
Glenora	18	5	0	6	134	74	10
Ellerslie United	19	4	1	5	143	48	9
Mount Albert	18	4	0	6	69	114	8
North Shore Albions	18	1	1	9	15	339	3
Manukau	19	1	0	12	34	362	2
Northcote & Birkenhead Ramblers	2	1	0	1	25	51	2

=== 5th Grade (Endean Shield) ===
Mount Albert won the championship with a 14–0 win over Green Lane on September 10. Green Lane met Richmond in the knockout competition final which ran from September 10 to October 8 but the result was not reported.

Team	Pld	W	D	L	F	A	Pts
Mount Albert United	17	11	0	1	207	38	22
Green Lane	17	4	0	5	78	73	8
Richmond Rovers	17	7	0	4	124	67	14
City Rovers	16	5	0	2	79	27	10
Northcote & Birkenhead Ramblers	16	4	0	7	72	95	8
North Shore Albions	16	4	0	5	58	97	8
Ellerslie United	17	4	0	5	60	130	8
Point Chevalier	16	1	0	7	35	130	2
Papakura	16	1	0	6	14	70	2

=== 6th Grade (Rhodes Shield) ===
Ponsonby won the championship. On August 20 Ponsonby beat Richmond 7-3 but the match was ordered to be replayed. Ponsonby won the match on September 3 and then got to play Marist in a playoff for the title. Ponsonby won easily by 18 points to 0. On June 11 Richmond beat Avondale 6-3 however they had fielded an over age player. The player in question had provided their younger brothers birth certificate and had been registered by the ARL. Richmond argued that the ARL was complicit if they were. The league eventually decided to replay the game. The replay was on August 6 and Richmond won 8–4 after having won the original match 6–3. Richmond won the knockout competition when they beat Otahuhu 32 to 8 on September 17.

Team	Pld	W	D	L	F	A	Pts
Ponsonby United	18	14	1	3	216	70	29
Marist Old Boys	17	11	1	5	116	70	23
Richmond Rovers	21	13	2	4	194	63	28
Avondale	18	4	0	11	115	107	8
Otahuhu Rovers	17	4	0	12	90	132	8
Green Lane	5	0	0	5	18	97	0
Newton Rangers	8	0	0	6	0	210	0

=== 7th Grade (Myers Cup) ===
Richmond won the championship and the knockout title with a 15–5 win over City on August 20. They played a friendly match against Hikurangi from Northland on September 3 and won 15–5.

Team	Pld	W	D	L	F	A	Pts
Richmond Rovers	13	10	0	2	161	30	20
Ellerslie United	13	5	0	3	39	50	10
City Rovers	13	3	2	3	41	76	8
Manukau	14	2	2	6	55	85	6
Point Chevalier	13	2	0	3	50	46	4
North Shore Albions	13	2	0	1	21	18	4
Papakura	13	1	2	6	37	67	4
Glenora	7	1	0	3	10	42	2

=== Schoolboy competitions ===
The majority of teams were affiliated with a club side and were made up of schoolboys from that areas schools rather than one school in particular.

==== Senior (Lou Rout Trophy) ====
Richmond won the championship and the knockout competition (Stanley Cup) when they beat Mount Albert 18–6 on October 1. In late July a senior Auckland schoolboys team was selected to play against the South Auckland (Waikato) side for the Golden Bloom banner. The side included future New Zealand representatives Ron McGregor and George Davidson, and other future senior players. The team was:- Morrie Brockliss (Northcote), A. Speedy (Otahuhu), N. Green (Avondale), V. Ryall, Ron McGregor (Richmond), J. Sorby (Newton), Colin Riley (Green Lane), A. Hayson (Ponsonby); forwards, G. Lewis, K. Jarvis (Point Chevalier), A. Clark (Glenora), R. Fielder (Green Lane), George Davidson (Mount Albert), K. Lorrigan (Newton), J. Brien (Newton).

Team	Pld	W	D	L	F	A	Pts
Richmond Rovers	15	11	0	0	303	5	22
Newton Rangers	15	6	0	1	117	41	12
Avondale	15	4	0	2	78	17	8
Mount Albert United	14	4	0	1	50	14	8
Green Lane	16	2	1	2	23	66	5
Point Chevalier	15	2	1	5	38	100	5
Otahuhu Rovers	15	0	2	6	18	97	2
Ponsonby United	15	1	0	5	34	77	2
Glenora	13	1	0	6	16	129	0

==== Intermediate championship (Newport Shield) ====
Richmond won the championship (Newport Shield), and the Eccles Memorial Shield. They won the knockout competition when they beat Ponsonby 25–11 in the final on October 1, and a week later they beat Newton in the champion of champions match. Newton had finished runner up in the championship. St Patricks School on Wellington Street in Freemans Bay entered two teams in the competition after five weeks under the umbrella of the City Rovers club which was situated in the area.

Team	Pld	W	D	L	F	A	Pts
Richmond	15	10	1	0	231	12	21
Newton	15	4	2	2	77	25	10
George Courts	14	4	1	3	60	99	9
Ellerslie	14	3	0	3	39	40	6
Northcote	14	2	2	2	25	22	6
Avondale	15	2	1	3	28	36	5
Ponsonby	14	2	0	2	26	26	4
North Shore	15	1	1	0	25	12	3
Balmoral	13	1	1	3	15	115	3
St Patricks A	10	1	0	7	42	113	2
Point Chevalier	16	0	1	2	3	33	1
St Patricks B	7	0	0	2	5	46	0

==== Junior championship (Robert Reid Memorial Shield) ====
Ponsonby won the competition when they beat Ellerslie in the final on October 22. Not all results were reported so their exact numbers in the standings are incomplete. St Patricks School on Wellington Street in Freemans Bay entered a side on August 20. Napier Street school also entered a team on August 20 but they only played a small number of fixtures and lost two games by default.

Team	Pld	W	D	L	F	A	Pts
Ponsonby	23	13	3	2	101	9	29
Ellerslie	26	14	3	3	103	36	31
George Courts	26	16	1	3	198	41	33
Richmond	24	14	3	2	119	27	31
Manukau	24	11	1	5	106	55	23
Newton	25	8	2	3	50	27	18
Point Chevalier	23	6	3	8	40	75	15
Mount Albert United	22	5	2	8	40	61	12
Glenora	26	5	2	13	30	127	12
Balmoral	22	4	1	13	49	113	9
Avondale	24	3	2	10	32	84	8
Northcote	24	3	0	13	15	81	6
St Patricks	11	2	0	5	11	23	4
Green Lane	23	0	0	17	6	151	0
Napier Street	4	0	0	2	0	0	0

== Representative fixtures ==
=== Auckland v Rest of North Island ===
18 May	Auckland	67-14	Rest of North Island	Carlaw Park 1
3:00	Try: Clarry McNeil 3, Jack Brodrick 3, Rangi Chase, Brian Riley, Walter Brimble, Wally Tittleton, Des Herring, Jack Satherley, Angus Gault, John Anderson, Harold Tetley; Con: Jack Smith 7, John Anderson 4		Try: E Mustchen, H Rodgers, E Taylor 2 Pen: E Taylor	Referee: Maurice Wetherill

=== North Island v South Island (inter-island match) ===
Brian Riley was initially named to play for the North Island side but as he was unable to get leave from work to potentially tour Australia if selected he was replaced in the North Island side.

21 May	North Island	55-2	South Island	Carlaw Park 1
1:30	Try: Gordon Midgley, Rangi Chase 2, Walter Brimble, Des Herring 3, Jack Satherley, Joe Cootes, Angus Gault, Jack Brodrick, Clarry McNeil; Con: Jack Smith 10; Pen: Jack Smith		Pen: P Scott	Referee: Frank Thompson

=== Probables v Possibles ===
The Possibles team led 19–0 at halftime and so the selectors switched the forwards and three players who had started in the Possibles side scored points for the Probables in the second half (Bert Leatherbarrow, John Anderson, and Bill McNeight).

21 May	Probables	21-25	Possibles	Carlaw Park 1
1:45	Try: Arthur Kay, Bert Leatherbarrow 2, John Anderson, Bill McNeight; Con: John Anderson 3		Try: Tommy Chase 2, Verdun Scott 2, John Anderson 2, Bill Breed; Con: Frank Furnell 2	Referee: Frank Thompson

=== Auckland Māori (Tamaki) v Auckland Pākehā ===
During the match 24 year old Joseph Alva Gunning received a kick to the head and went to Auckland Hospital with concussion. It was said that his condition was not serious however the New Zealand Herald reported two weeks later that he had only recently been discharged from hospital with the intention of playing in the upcoming weekend match for Mount Albert though he ultimately didn't return until their July 2 match. Ted Brimble, the Auckland Māori first five-eighth injured his leg in the first half and was replaced by Mihaka Panapa.

6 June	Auckland Māori (Tamaki)	26-21	Auckland Pākehā	Carlaw Park 1
3:00	Try: J Wilson 2, Noel Bickerton, Peter Mahima, Pita Ririnui, Martin Hansen; Con: Tommy Chase 3 Pen: Tommy Chase		Try: A Duncan, Ted Mincham, Walker, Bert Leatherbarrow, Clarrie Petersen; Con: Verdun Scott, Ted Mincham 2	Referee: Stuart Billman

=== Auckland v New Zealand ===
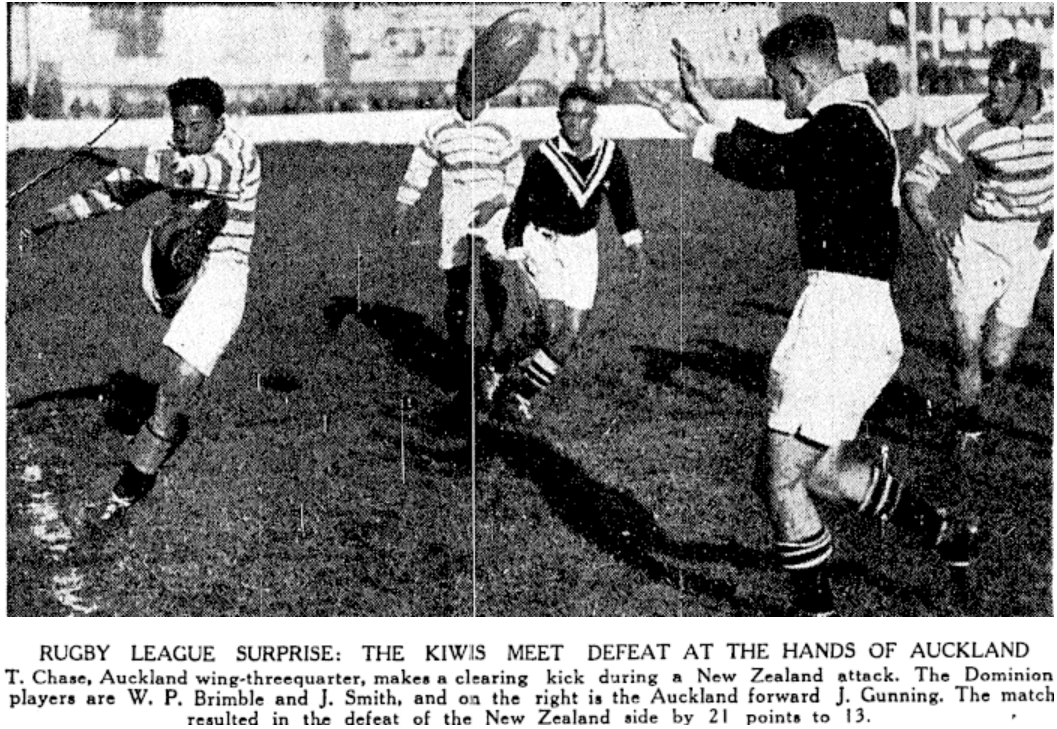
Tommy Chase kicking with Walter Brimble following for New Zealand.

16 July	Auckland	21-13	New Zealand	Carlaw Park 1
3:00	Try: Jack Campbell, Bob Banham, Joseph Gunning, Clarrie Petersen 2 Con: Verdun Scott, Tommy Chase; Pen: Tommy Chase		Try: Rangi Chase, Jack Smith, Jack McLeod; Con: Jack Hemi 2	Attendance: 15,000; Referee: Frank Thompson

=== Auckland v Canterbury ===
13 August	Auckland	28-22	Canterbury	Carlaw Park 1
3:00	Try: Rangi Chase 3, Trevor Bramley, Pita Ririnui, Jack Brodrick; Con: Jack Hemi 5		Try: Ces Davison, Ray Brown, R Price 2 Con: Ces Davison, W Guy; Pen: Ces Davison 3	Referee: Owen Chalmers

=== Auckland representative matches played and scorers ===
No	Name	Club Team	Play	Tries	Con	Pen	Points
1	Jack Smith	North Shore	1	0	7	0	14
2	John Anderson	Marist	1	4	0	0	12
2	Jack Brodrick	Manukau	2	4	0	0	12
4	Jack Hemi	Manukau	1	0	5	0	10
5	Rangi Chase	Manukau	1	3	0	0	9
5	Clarry McNeil	Mount Albert	1	3	0	0	9
7	Clarrie Peterson	North Shore	1	2	0	0	6
8	Bob Banham	Ponsonby	1	1	0	0	3
8	Trevor Bramley	Richmond	1	1	0	0	3
8	Walter Brimble	Manukau	2	1	0	0	3
8	Jack Campbell	Ponsonby	1	1	0	0	3
8	Angus Gault	Manukau	1	1	0	0	3
8	Joseph Gunning	Mount Albert	1	1	0	0	3
8	Des Herring	Mount Albert	1	1	0	0	3
8	Pita Ririnui	Manukau	1	1	0	0	3
8	Jack Satherley	Richmond	2	1	0	0	3
8	Harold Tetley	Richmond	1	1	0	0	3
8	Wally Tittleton	Richmond	1	1	0	0	3
19	Tommy Chase	Manukau	2	0	0	1	2
19	Verdun Scott	North Shore	1	0	1	0	2
21	Peter Mahima	Manukau	2	0	0	0	0
21	Wilfred Brimble	Newton	1	0	0	0	0
21	Alf Broadhead	Richmond	1	0	0	0	0
21	Merv Devine	Richmond	1	0	0	0	0
21	Bill Glover	Marist	1	0	0	0	0
21	Reginald Haslam	Marist	1	0	0	0	0
21	Bert Leatherbarrow	Richmond	1	0	0	0	0
21	Jack McLeod	Richmond	1	0	0	0	0
21	Edgar Morgan	Ponsonby	1	0	0	0	0
21	Brian Riley	Ponsonby	1	0	0	0	0
21	Richard Shadbolt	Mount Albert	1	0	0	0	0

=== Auckland Pākehā representative matches played and scoring ===
No	Name	Club Team	Play	Tries	Con	Pen	DG	Points
1	Ted Mincham	Richmond	1	1	2	0	0	7
2	A Duncan	Newton	1	1	0	0	0	3
2	R Walker	Mount Albert	1	1	0	0	0	3
2	Bert Leatherbarrow	Mount Albert	1	1	0	0	0	3
2	Clarrie Peterson	Ponsonby	1	1	0	0	0	3
6	Verdun Scott	North Shore	1	0	1	0	0	2
7	Bob Banham	Mount Albert	1	0	0	0	0	0
7	Arthur McInnarney	Mount Albert	1	0	0	0	0	0
7	Phil Donovan	Marist	1	0	0	0	0	0
7	Alf Broadhead	Richmond	1	0	0	0	0	0
7	Richard Shadbolt	Mount Albert	1	0	0	0	0	0
7	Joseph Gunning	Mount Albert	1	0	0	0	0	0
7	Edgar Morgan	Ponsonby	1	0	0	0	0	0

== Auckland Māori (Tāmaki) representative season ==
Auckland Māori only played one match during the season. The club competition ran much longer than it had in previous seasons and the New Zealand side went on a mid season tour of Australia meaning that there were relatively few opportunities for representative matches. On June 6 they played an Auckland Pākehā side at Carlaw Park and won 26 to 21.

=== Tāmaki (Auckland Māori) representative matches played and scorers ===
Mihaka Panapa came on to replace Ted Brimble in their match just before half time after Brimble injured his leg.

No	Name	Club Team	Play	Tries	Con	Pen	Points
1	Tommy Chase	Manukau	1	0	3	1	8
2	R Wilson	Manukau	1	2	0	0	6
3	Noel Bickerton	Richmond	1	1	0	0	3
3	Peter Mahima	Manukau	1	1	0	0	3
3	Pita Ririnui	Manukau	1	1	0	0	3
3	Martin Hansen	Mount Albert	1	1	0	0	3
7	L Cootes	Ponsonby	1	0	0	0	0
7	Alex Nathan	Newton	1	0	0	0	0
7	Jack Tristram	Mount Albert	1	0	0	0	0
7	Steve Watene	Newton	1	0	0	0	0
7	Kendall	Newton	1	0	0	0	0
7	Jack Broughton	Manukau	1	0	0	0	0
7	Ted Brimble	Newton	1	0	0	0	0
7	Mihaka Panapa	Manukau	1	0	0	0	0

== Annual general meetings and club news ==
- Auckland Rugby League Junior Management Committee At the junior control board annual meeting on March 8 Mr. D. Wilkie presided. The following board was elected: Messrs. W. Berger, E. Chapman, C. Howe, J. Stonex, A. Hopkinson, E. McNamara, D. Wilkie, F. Kennedy, R. Short. On April 12 at their board meeting they set April 22 as the final day for nominations for the junior grades with a tentative start date for games on April 30.
- Auckland Rugby League Referees Association held their annual meeting in early March. The retiring secretary Mr. Wilfred Simpson was made a life member of the association. The following officers were elected:- President, Mr. Les Bull; vice-president Mr. J.G. McCowatt; hon. secretary Mr. T.E. Skinner; treasurer Mr. A. Chapman; auditor Mr. Percy Rogers; delegates, A.R.L., Mr. M. Renton, N.Z. Referees’ Association Mr. Les Bull, representative grading committee, Messrs. Maurice Wetherill, Percy Rogers, R Otto. On March 28 at a meeting the Referees Association received a letter from the control board advising them that Mr. R.H. Benson had been reappointed as their representative on their board with Mr T. Davis as deputy. On April 4 M. Renton resigned as delegate to the junior management. He along with A. Sanders were then elected as the grading and examination committee with Les Bull nominated as third man on the appointments board, subject to approval by the control board. At their final meeting of the year on October 3 Percy Rogers announced that he was retiring from active refereeing. He thanked Messrs. Leslie Edgar Bull, McCowatt, and Arthur Ball. Tribute was paid to president Bull for "his able chairmanship and guidance in administrative matters". Thanks was also said to Messrs. A. McCowatt, William Mincham, J. Short, T.E. Skinner, and Arthur Rae. On the day of the Stormont Shield final which Percy Rogers refereed he was presented with a blazer. He had been a prominent referee for 16 years and refereed many international matches. Mr. F.H. Whitman who had cared for traveling teams was presented with a travelling outfit.
- Avondale League Football Club In June Avondale advised the ARL junior management board that it had decided to form a junior officers’ club, to collaborate with the Auckland Rugby League in "any matters for the good of the game". In late June the Avondale league clubs football ladies’ committee held a "highly successful" dance at the Oddfellows’ Hall. The dance hall and supper room were decorated in the club's colours. They held a dance at the Oddfellow's Hall in early October in honour of a visiting team from Whangarei. The venue was decorated in the colours of both clubs. The programme "consisted of new and old time dances and items from Māori members of the Northern team. The visitors were welcomed by the chairman, Mr. L. Hulhman, and Mr. Dunkley, secretary of the Northland league". On December 10 Avondale held their annual picnic at Tui Glen in Henderson with 150 present.
- City Rovers held a practice on March 12 at Carlaw Park. They were advertising for "vacancies for players in all grades, and applications are invited". They held their annual picnic on Motuihe Island on October 9, departing central Auckland at 9:30 on board the Baroona. Over 500 members and supporters attended. Trophies were presented to D. Hutchinson who was the most consistent player (C. Haynes’ Cup), and E. McCarthy for training attendance for the reserve grade side. E. Wehner and Jack Rata were tied for honours for senior training and general merit. Wehner received a medal from Mr. W. Johnson and Rata received the club medal. Their fourth grade team was presented with the G. Gillett Cup for winning the championship, and the Raynes Cup for the most club championship points. Other individual awards presented were: (Third Grade) First try of the season, J. Sullivan; most improved player, E. Grey; most improved uniform, A. Bain; control of fourth team, A. Mitchell. (Fifth Grade) most consistent player, R. Robinson; best behaved, Leslie Beehre. (Seventh grade) best back, J. Hubbard; best forward, E. Purdy; behaviour, L. Pell; most improved, J. Tuki; most improved forward, D. McCormack; and most consistent, J. Haora. Trophies were donated by Messrs. Morrison, Glover, F.H. Whitham, C.E. Johnston, Farley, B. Messenger, and W. Roff.
- Ellerslie United Rugby League Club held their annual meeting in early March. Their report made mention of the 3rd grade team which won the knock-out competition. The 4th grade side was runner-up in the championship, while the schoolboys seven-a-side team was only defeated once. They stated that they were in a "satisfactory financial position". Cups were presented to J. McArthur who was the best back in the club, and Ernie Pinches, the best forward. Both players were members of the 3rd grade team. The following officers were elected: Patron, Mr. Arthur Osborne, M.P.; president, Mr. J. McInnarney; vice-presidents, Messrs, R.H. McIsaac, J. Court, A. Chapman, A. McKenzie, C. Clarke, Carver, Whelan, R. Cameron; club captain, Mr. F. Chapman; secretary and treasurer, Mr. George Whaley; auditors, J. Carr, O.D. Slye; committee, Messrs, J. Wilson (chairman), A. Strong, R. Hunter, A Tobin, S. Pemberton, C. Pemberton, R. Boss, C. Tucker, W. Miller, H. Thomas, H. Johnson, J. Pinches, M. Campbell. They held their annual picnic at Point England.
- Rugby league in Manurewa. On March 22 rugby league and rugby union both made claims to use the grounds at Jellicoe Park to the Manurewa Borough Council. Rugby league asked for use of the ground on alternate Saturdays for its 28 registered players in the area while rugby officials said "they were solely dependent upon the facilities for the 39 players on their books". The Mayor Mr. W.J. Ferguson said "he had hoped the two codes would have been able to arrange matters amicably. The council had to weigh equitably the claims of the community. It was decided to offer the codes equal use of the park and to make a charge of 10/6 each playing day. It was suggested that a senior match should be arranged for each Saturday".
- Marist Brothers Old Boys League Football Club held their annual meeting on March 10 at 7.45pm at the Auckland Rugby League Rooms. The club's secretary Mr. Joe Sayegh congratulated the senior team on their success after they missed out on the championship by one competition point, but won the Roope Rooster trophy and Stormont Shield. The balance sheet reportedly showed a "substantial credit balance". The following officers were elected:- Patron, His Lordship Bishop Liston; president, Mr. Joe Sayegh; vice-presidents, same as last year; secretary Jack Kirwan; honorary treasurer, Mr. P. Fletcher; committee, Messrs J. Ball, W. Maddigan, Fraser Hudson Webberley, George Copas, P. Hughes. On October 29 they held their annual prize giving with over 300 members and supporters present. ARL chairman, G. Grey Campbell presented the club with the Fox Memorial Shield, and the Thistle Cup for the most points in the second round. Individual and team prizes went to McLeod (most improved player), Stanaway (most conscientious at training), third grade: McWilliams and Hughes, sixth grade: Sydney Bracegirdle. R.L. Haslam was presented with a handbag in recognition of his services to the club. He had announced his retirement but club president Joe Sayegh said he hoped he would still be available for the following season. The club then issued its new official badges which were a shamrock with the title initials on green petals over a gold background.
- Manukau Rugby League Club In mid February, Manukau secured Pita Ririnui from Tauranga to play for them. He was a former rugby representative player who had played for the combined Poverty Bay-East Coast-Bay of Plenty against the Springboks in Gisborne in 1937. The South African captain Philip Nel had said that he was one of the best forwards that they had met on the tour of Australia and New Zealand. Ririnui was "6ft 1in in height, weighs 16st, and is 22 years of age". It was also reported that T, Kakau a sizeable rugby back was also moving to Auckland. A special meeting of players was to be held at Onehunga on February 28. They held practice matches against visiting teams from the Lower Waikato on March 26. Two junior sides would play teams from Ngaruawahia, while the senior team would play South Auckland (Waikato). The matches would be played at Waikaraka Park. In late November the council the Onehunga Borough Council turned down Manukau's application to lease Gloucester Park. The ground was formerly known as Geddes Basin and had been drained in 1934 before being transformed into a sports ground. It had laid idle for three years. Mr. N.A. Ching wrote to the council on behalf of the Manukau club offering to lease the ground for 10 years at a rental of £25 a year with the right of further renewal, and a further £25 a year if the lease of a cottage was included. They also undertook to spend "at least £100 a year on improvements and buildings". However Mr. W.J. Moore of the council was of the opinion that "it was inadvisable at the present time to grant a lease of Gloucester Park, in view of its future potentialities, and on his motion this course was adopted.
- Mount Albert United Rugby League Football Club Their annual meeting was held on February 28. The club was reported to be in a "sound financial position". There were a number of new players registering with the club which indicated "a very successful season" on offer. It was decided to begin training immediately. The following officers were elected:- Patron, the mayor of Mount Albert; vice-patron, Mr. Arthur Shapton Richards, M.P.; president, Mr. A.C. Gallagher; vice-presidents, same as last year with power to add; hon. secretary, Mr. H.G. Shaw; hon. treasurer, Mr. William Edmund Schultz; club captain, Mr. F. Martin, hon. auditor, Mr. S.C. Johnston. In mid October they held their annual prize giving at the Manchester Unity Hall. Prizes were given to best club schoolboy, I. Garrett; best club member (annual), C. Allan; schoolboy coaching services, A. Jenkinson. Senior grade: Most improved player, A. McLaughlan; most consistent forward, Richard Seddon Shadbolt, reserve grade: back, C. Renton; forward (annual), C. Callinan; annual 100 yards championship for C. Elwin Memorial Cup, and for coaching services, Claude List; goal kicking, E. Cranch; consistent forward, F. List, Third grade: Best all-rounder, M Haswell; back, J Mens; forward, W. Stewart; improved player A. Chiswell. Fifth grade: back, W. Carter; good conduct, James Seath; improved back, R. Hogan; improved forward, P. Lenihan, Schoolboys: Improved player, N. Clark: best dressed (seven-a-side), D. Greenhalgh: coaching services, N. Lake.
- Newton Rangers Football Club It was reported in July that former player Roy Hardgrave was returning to New Zealand after playing for York and Toulouse. J. Lee, an Australian was taken on as their senior coach.
- North Shore Albions held their annual meeting on March 9 at the Labour Hall in Devonport at 8pm.
- Northcote and Birkenhead Ramblers Football Club were granted the use of Stafford Park on "the usual terms to the Northcote Ramblers League Football Club for matches and practice". On June 28 at the meeting of the junior management committee they read a letter from Northcote advising that their secretary, Mr. Andrew Borrows was having to resign owing to his departure from Auckland. Mr. J. Evans had been appointed in his place. On August 23 Northcote asked for permission to send their senior B team to visit Whangarei the following Saturday.
- Otahuhu Rovers Rugby League Football Club Otahuhu elected the following officers at its annual meeting in early March: Patron, Mr. H.F. Clements; president, Mr. C Hill; last years vice presidents were re-appointed with additions hon. secretary Owen McManus; treasurer C.F. Clarke; committee Messrs W. Clinton, W. Gordon, C. Dunne, C. Kelly, A Porteous, W. Hart, I Auckram, A. Pond; captains, Messrs R. Roud and B. McDonald. Their report stated that the third and fifth grades won their respective titles and were runners up in the knockout competitions. While the schoolboys team was runner up in its grade". In late March Otahuhu applied for permission to train on Sturges Park on Thursday evenings to the Otahuhu Borough Council. The Otahuhu Rugby Club applied for permission to train at Sturges Park on Tuesday and Thursday nights and to be able to use the ground on Saturday afternoons until the season opened. The matter was referred to the parks committee. In mid August John Nicholson died aged 80. He was the president of Otahuhu for many years. Otahuhu nominated a team to enter the Roope Rooster competition in August. They also asked to stage a special match as a benefit for the Otahuhu Free Kindergarten. As the draw had already been made for the Roope Rooster competition the league suggested they nominate a team for the Stallard Cup which was competed for by the senior reserve teams.
- Papakura Rugby League Football Club At their annual meeting on March 3 they made special note of the excellent record of their senior side which won the senior B grade. They only lost one match out of 18 and won the Foster Memorial Shield, the Sharman Cup, and the Walmsley Shield. Their membership for 1937 totalled 133 with 12 honorary members which was a record for the club. Mr. R. Walsh presented the balance sheet which showed that the club had a credit balance of £117 1s 3d which was £30 more than the year before despite having some heavy expenses including £83 for transport. The club patron, Mr. H.A. Pollock presented the club with a new set of jerseys. The following officers were elected:- Patron, Mr. Hugh Arnold Pollock; president, Mr. L. McVeigh; vice-presidents, Messrs. C. Chamberlain, William James Davidson Jack, Sydney Herbert Godden, Francis Verner; treasurer, R. Walsh; club captain, F. Osborne; auditor, J. Beans; committee, Messrs, A. McDonald, G. Wilson, William Cornthwaite, P. Hammond, V. Ashby, I. Wilson, Norman Widdowson, E. Searle, J. Ansley; grounds committee, A. Schawtfeger, J. McVeigh, R. Bates, F. Barnes, F. Maddren, D. Watts. Papakura applied for the use of Prince Edward Park for the season. The Papakura Board granted use of the park until its term expired, and advised the club to make an application again to the new borough council, for definite terms of tenure and rental. At the Papakura Town Board meeting Mr. D. Weir said "we should definitely give the club an incentive to do something for itself at Prince Edward Park by allowing it to have a longer lease of say a few years if that could be arranged". On 11 April the Papakura Board granted the use of Prince Edward Park and its floodlighting for the football season. The Papakura club invited Frank Osborne, their club captain to stand as an independent candidate for the Papakura Borough Council. He was employed at the time as an engine driver for New Zealand Railways. He was also the president of the Amateur Athletic Club. It was reported Papakura had a strong connection with athletics through its players. The New Zealand Herald stated that "C. Osborne, one of the three-quarters, has built up a fine athletic record this season, competing at meetings conducted by the Papakura, Manurewa, Papatoetoe, Otahuhu and Pukekohe clubs. J. Fogarty and D. Evans, two well-built forwards, whose stamina and speed impressed on Saturday, have also had successes at these meetings. T.R. Burgess has been prominent in the Otahuhu Clubs events during the past two years, while Ewan Cossey, the halfback, has been placed in 100 yards events at Papakura in the past month. They notified the league that in early July Messrs. Sydney Herbert Godden and A. Schwartfeger had replaced Messrs E. Searle, and H. Widdowson respectively on its executive. In October Papakura celebrated their season at the Windsor Theatre with officials from the Auckland Rugby League and members of the Eastern Suburbs touring side. On November 27, Papakura held their third annual picnic with 500 in attendance at Mr. J. McNicol's property at Clevedon.
- Point Chevalier League Football Club They were granted permission to hold a club day at Walker Park on June 25 where all their teams would play there. The day was in aid of the St John Ambulance Association.
- Ponsonby United Football Club They held their annual meeting on February 28. Their report stated that the success of their junior teams was "outstanding" with the schoolboy intermediate team winning the championship by scoring 304 points and having none registered against it". They also listed their nine senior players who gained representative honours. They thanked their president Mr. A. Adams for donating medals and caps to the schoolboys team while a trophy donated by Mr. A. Barnett was awarded to Frank Halloran for the best sportsman in the club. The following officers were elected:- Patron, Mr. W. Grant; president Mr. J. Arnell; hon. secretary, Mr. W. Grieves; hon. treasurer, Mr. L. Adams.
- Richmond Rovers Football Club held their 24th annual meeting in the Gaiety Hall in Grey Lynn on March 3 with Mr. B.W. Davis presiding before a "large attendance". At the opening of the meeting he requested that they stand in silence as a mark of respect to their patron, the late Mr. W.J. Holdsworth. Their report was satisfied with the club's success with ten grade teams and a seven-a-side Richmond was successful in winning the senior, senior reserve, 4th grade, and senior school championships. They once again won the Davis Points Shield which was open to all clubs for the most aggregate points in the junior grades. Mr. Ralph Jenkinson spoke about the various teams and then awarded the Harry Johns Memorial Cup to the senior reserve team. It was presented to their manager Mr. J. McGregor and their captain Mr. M. Metcalfe. The club also congratulated Harold Tetley, Wally Tittleton, Noel Bickerton, Jack Satherley, Jack McLeod, and George Mitchell on gaining New Zealand representative honours. The club was reported to be in a sound financial position. They elected the following officers:- Patron, Mr. J. Redwood; senior president, Mr. B.W. Davis; chairman, Mr. W.A. Swift; secretary and treasurer, Mr. W.R. Dick; delegate to primary schools’ management committee, Mr. E.J. McCarthy; club captain, Mr. Ralph Jenkinson, auditor, Mr. J.A. Redwood. Richmond held their annual picnic at Tui Glen in Henderson on December 11 with "about 450 members and friends attending". K. Fletcher was presented with the Warnock Points Shield for the year, while caps were presented to players in the championship winning sides which included the senior reserve team, the third grade, seventh grade, senior schoolboys and intermediate schoolboys.

== Senior grade registration and transfers ==
On March 3 the following players were registered: Ian Mackenzie (ex King Country), and H.P.S. Walker (ex Queensland) to Mount Albert. Pita Ririnui and T Ririnui (Tauranga) and T Kakau to Manukau, and Ronald Beaumont Chesterman to North Shore Albions. On March 29 fifty new registrations were received while William Caples transferred from Point Chevalier to City Rovers seniors, and Ernie Pinches from Ellerslie to Mount Albert seniors. Twenty six player registrations were approved on March 30 with P Young being transferred from Newton Rangers to Ponsonby and J.J. Campbell formerly of Hikurangi being reinstated. Then on March 31 G.E. King of Newton Rangers transferred to Huntly, and Noel Messenger also of Newton transferred to Greymouth on the West Coast.

On April 6 R.A. Lush transferred from Richmond to Ponsonby reserves. J. Fraser had his transfer cleared from Western Suburbs, New Plymouth to Ponsonby. While Robert John Blakely, Thos Kelly, and Arthur Samuel Slater were reinstated. On April 13 William V.R. Smith transferred from Newton to North Shore, F Butler from Newton to Marist, Patrick Costello from Manukau senior reserves to North Shore, Thos Kelly from Manukau to Papakura, E. McNeil from Richmond to Ponsonby, Norm Campbell (player-coach) from Marist to Papakura, J.E. Pyke from Point Chevalier to Manukau, and J. Campbell from Point Chevalier to Ponsonby. J Hilton of South Auckland was cleared to play for Newton, W.G. Johnson (South Auckland to Newton), C. Preston (West Coast to Marist), E. Jones from Northland to Newton. I.N. Ibbertson was reinstated and transferred from Glenora senior B to Ponsonby. On April 19 Alan Jabez Watkins transferred from Mount Albert to Richmond, G Crocker transferred from Marist to Papakura and T Maher from R.V. senior B to City. Clarry McNeil had a clearance confirmed from Wellington to Mount Albert. On April 27 D.F. Harris was reinstated and transferred to Otahuhu.

On May 4 the following players were granted transfers:- R.P. Tatana, Manukau to City; A.J. Couper, Richmond senior B to Ponsonby seniors; R. McGreal, Marist to Ngaruawahia; Daniel Hourigan, Newton to Ponsonby; Arthur McInnarney, Ellerslie to Mount Albert. While J. Blackledge was cleared from Wellington to Auckland where he would join Northcote. On May 11 Steve Watene was transferred from Manukau to his old club, City Rovers, and a week later to Newton Rangers, while H.J. Collins was transferred from Newton to Mount Albert and C. Wilson from Marist reserves to Papakura. On May 18 G. Greenwood was transferred from Mount Albert to Richmond, and S Bickerton transferred from Mount Albert to Newton. On May 25 W. Mallinson from Waiutu, West Coast joined Manukau. C Meyer, the Northland representative player and brother of ex-international Ted Meyer applied to join the Papakura club. M.T. Nicholas was registered with Manukau and F. Anderson with Papakura.

On June 1 C Philp transferred from Manukau to Green Lane while B.F. Lee of Toowoomba transferred to Auckland to play for Newton pending approval from the New Zealand Council. Russell Harris was reinstated to Otahuhu. On June 22 F.J. Halpin (ex-Manawatu) and C. Greenwood (with clearance from Manukau) were registered with Newton, while Vincent Axman was registered with North Shore with clearance from City. W.W. Philp and Owen Noel Beer were reinstated. W. Cuff was transferred from Newton to Mount Albert. On June 29 L. Bramble (ex-Central Club in Wellington) was registered with the Newton club. W.L. Dorman transferred from Point Chevalier Senior B to Ponsonby. C.J. Montgomery was reinstated.

On July 7 Edgard Herbert Mervyn Tredrea transferred from Richmond 3rd grade to Newton.

On July 13 H.J. Collins was transferred from Manukau to Mount Albert, and W. Stockley from Ponsonby to Northcote. While F.J. Wells was registered with Ponsonby, C. Meredith with North Shore, and R. McInnarney with Mount Albert. On July 19 J. W. Stockley and F Halloran transferred from Ponsonby seniors to Northcote Senior B. On July 27 A Beyer, the former representative player from Northland, was regraded and transferred from Richmond to Ellerslie. He admitted to the committee that he had made an application to rugby to be reinstated but was refused. On August 9 T. Thompson was transferred from Manukau reserves to Ellerslie senior B. On August 17 R Jones was regraded to senior B and transferred to Otahuhu while J. Greenwood was reinstated to play for Richmond. On August 24 Roy Hardgrave was registered with Mount Albert, F Whittle to City, and Paul Meyer to North Shore.

On September 7 C. Ericksen was registered with Marist, W. Walker with Papakura (subject to a clearance from Taranaki), and G Rowlands from Newcastle in Australia to the City club, subject to approval by the New Zealand Council. A.J. Dufty was transferred from Point Chevalier second grade to City reserves.
