= 1936 Eastern Suburbs season =

← 1935	1937 →

The 1936 Eastern Suburbs DRLFC season was the 29th in the club's history. Coached by Arthur Halloway and captained by Dave Brown, they competed in the 1936 NSWRFL Premiership, becoming only the second team to go through a season undefeated and winning their 7th minor premiership. They then went on to reach the Premiership Final, defeating Balmain and claiming their 6th title.

The NSWRFL's top try scorer for the season was Easts' Fred Tottey with 25 tries. The club's players to represent Australia were: Dave Brown (captain), Jack Beaton, Ernie Norman, Viv Thicknesse, Joe Pearce and Ray Stehr. Brown left Easts, signing a three-year deal with English club the Warrington, at the end of the season.

== Squad ==
The Eastern Suburbs line-up for the 1936 season contained:- Wal Bamford, Jack Beaton, John Beckly, Dave Brown(c), John Clarke, Jack Coote, Jack 'Buster' Craigie, Tom Dowling, Albert Horsell, Jack Lynch, H. McCallum, Tom McLachlan, Ross McKinnon, Ernie Norman, Andy Norval, Rod O'Loan, Johnny Parker, Sid 'Joe' Pearce Henry 'harry' Pierce, Viv Thicknesse.

== Regular season ==
- Premiership Round 1, Eastern Suburbs 26 defeated South Sydney 9(Bernie Martin Try; F. Felsch 2, J. Tait Goals) at Sydney Sports Ground.
- Premiership Round 2, Eastern Suburbs 18 defeated St George 15(M. Ryan, L. Kelly, Percy Fairall tries; M. Ryan 3 Goals) at Earl Park.
- Premiership Round 3, Bye.
- Premiership Round 4, Eastern Suburbs 17 drew with Western Suburbs 17 at Pratten Park.
- Premiership Round 5, Eastern Suburbs 34 defeated University 8 at Sydney Sports Ground.
- Premiership Round 6, Eastern Suburbs 23 defeated Newtown 11 at Sydney Cricket Ground.
- Premiership Round 7, Canterbury Bankstown 18( J. Hartwell 2, A. Brady, R. Mitchel Tries; T. Kirk 3 Goals) drew with Eastern Suburbs 18 at Sydney Cricket Ground.
- Premiership Round 8, Eastern Suburbs 19 defeated North Sydney 11(R. Thompson Try; R.Thompson 4 Goals) at Sydney Sports Ground.
- Premiership Round 9, Eastern Suburbs 19 defeated Balmain 15 at Sydney Sports Ground.
- Premiership Round 10, Eastern Suburbs 23 defeated South Sydney 8(H. Thompson, E. Lewis Tries;F. Felsch Goal) at Sydney Cricket Ground.
- Premiership Round 11, Eastern Suburbs 23 defeated St George 5 at Sydney Cricket Ground.
- Premiership Round 12, Bye.
- Premiership Round 13, Eastern Suburbs 29 defeated Western Suburbs 13 at Sydney Cricket Ground.
- Premiership Round 14, Eastern Suburbs 50 defeated University 12 at Sydney Sports Ground.
- Premiership Round 15, Eastern Suburbs 36 defeated Newtown 3 at Sydney Cricket Ground.

== Ladder ==
	Team	Pld	W	D	L	B	PF	PA	PD	Pts
1	Eastern Suburbs	13	11	2	0	2	335	145	+190	28
2	Balmain	13	9	0	4	2	268	161	+107	22
3	Canterbury-Bankstown	14	9	2	3	1	345	243	+102	22
4	North Sydney	13	7	1	5	2	210	161	+49	19
5	Newtown	14	7	0	7	1	320	225	+95	16
6	Western Suburbs	13	5	1	7	2	199	201	+2	15
7	South Sydney	13	5	0	8	2	185	185	=0	14
8	St. George	13	3	0	10	2	141	228	-87	10
9	University	14	1	0	13	1	99	414	-315	4

=== Finals series ===
==== Semi-final ====
- Premiership Semifinal, Saturday 5 September 1936 - Three second half tries to captain Dave Brown saw Eastern Suburbs advance to the 1936 premiership decider

Eastern Suburbs 25(Dave Brown 3, Viv Thicknesse, Jack Lynch, Rod O'Loan, Fred Tottey tries; Tom Dowling, Jack Lynch goals) defeated Canterbury Bankstown 13 (J Gartner try; T Kirk 5 goals) at Belmore Sports Ground. Half time: 9-11. Crowd: 7201. Referee: Deane.

==== Premiership Final ====
Balmain Tigers	Position	Eastern Suburbs Roosters
Frank Johnston	FB	Tom Dowling
Sid Goodwin	WG	Rod O'Loan
Gus Reeves	CE	Dave Brown (c)
Eddie Lochart	CE	Jack Lynch
Jack Redman	WG	Fred Tottey
Sid Christensen (c)	FE	Ernie Norman
Tom Grahame	HB	Viv Thicknesse
Dave Manning	PR	Jack Coote
Bill Alexander	HK	Tom McLachlan
Frank Griffiths	PR	Ray Stehr
Bill Johnson	SR	Harry Pierce
Edmond Beaver	SR	Joe Pearce
Roy Palmer	LK	Andy Norval
Joe Busch	Coach	Arthur Halloway

In front of a crowd of 14,395 at the Sydney Cricket Ground Easts were vying for back-to-back premierships and took on Balmain.

The match, officiated by referee Lal Deane was tight in the first half with a scoreline favouring Easts 8-6 at the break. In the second half Easts ran away with the game, scoring eight tries all up to Balmain's two.

The game marked the end of sterling career for Tiger's champion and former international Joe "Chimpy" Busch, and was a suitable farewell for the Roosters' captain and star, Dave Brown, who headed to the English club Warrington for the 1937 and 1938 seasons.

Eastern Suburbs 32 (Tries: Fred Tottey 2, Rod O’Loan, Dave Brown, Ray Stehr, Ernie Norman, Jack Lynch, Andy Norval. Goals: Jack Lynch 2, Dave Brown 2 )

defeated

Balmain 12 (Tries: Frank Griffiths, Sid Goodwin. Goals: Sid Christensen 2, Bill Johnson)

Preceded by 1935	Season; 1936	Succeeded by 1937
