= 1935 Eastern Suburbs season =

← 1934	1936 →

Eastern Suburbs (now known as the Sydney Roosters) competed in the 28th New South Wales Rugby League (NSWRL) premiership in 1935.

== Details ==
line-up for the 1935 season contained:- Arthur 'Pony' Halloway (Coach); Jack Beaton, Dave Brown, Jack Coote, John Clarke, Tom Dowling, Gordon Favelle, Bill Halloway, Ross McKinnon, Tom McLachlan, Max Nixon, Ernie Norman, Andy Norval, Rod O'Loan, Sid 'Joe' Pearce, Henry 'Harry' Pierce, Viv Thicknesse, Fred Tottey, Les Trussler.

1935 was perhaps Dave Brown's most dominant. The season included scoring 38 tries for the year (a figure that has never been approached) and finishing with 244 points for the season. Brown twice scored six tries in a game and at one stage he had crossed for 22 tries in only five games. In one match he scored 45 points (five tries and 15 goals), another record that has stood the test of time.

== Season summary ==
- Premiership Round 1, Eastern Suburbs 14 (Brown, Dowling tries; Beaton 3, Brown Goals) defeated Newtown Jets 5 (Johnston Try; Alleyne Goal) at Marrickville Oval.
- Premiership Round 2, Eastern Suburbs 16 defeated St George 8 (J. Rutherford 2 tries; S. Robinson Goal) at Sydney Sports Ground.
- Premiership Round 3, Eastern Suburbs 23 defeated Western Suburbs 16 at Sydney Cricket Ground.
- Premiership Round 4, Bye
- Premiership Round 5, Eastern Suburbs 61 (Rod O'Loan 7, + 8 tries; 8 Goals) defeated University 5 at Sydney Sports Ground.
  Rod O'loan's 7 tries holds the Eastern Suburbs club's record and is the second most in premiership history.
- Premiership Round 6, Eastern Suburbs 87 (Dave Brown 5 + 14 Tries; Dave Brown 15 Goals) defeated Canterbury Bankstown 7 (Chaplin Try: Carey 2 Goals) at Sydney Sports Ground.

In this match Eastern Suburbs recorded the club's biggest win and the second biggest win ever recorded in Premiership history. Other premiership records set in this match are the 45 points scored by Dave Brown, this is the most points by any player in premiership history it came from 5 tries and 15 goals, his 15 goals stands (equally) as the most goals kicked in a premiership match.

- Premiership Round 7, Eastern Suburbs 57 defeated North Sydney 9 at Sydney Cricket Ground.
- Premiership Round 8, South Sydney 18 (Thompson 2, Curran, Shankland Tries; Percy Williams 2, McDonald Goals) defeated Eastern Suburbs 11 at Sydney Cricket Ground.
  This was the last loss Eastern Suburbs were to suffer until 25 April 1938.
- Premiership Round 9, Eastern Suburbs 15 beat Balmain 2 at Sydney Sports Ground.
- Premiership Round 10, Eastern Suburbs 40 defeated Newtown 10 at Sydney Cricket Ground.
- Premiership Round 11, Eastern Suburbs 16 defeated St George 13 at Sydney Cricket Ground.
- Premiership Round 12, Eastern Suburbs 27 defeated Western Suburbs 12 at Sydney Cricket Ground.
- Premiership Round 13, Bye:
- Premiership Round 14, Eastern Suburbs 40 defeated University 5 at Pratten Park.
- Premiership Round 15, Eastern Suburbs Eastern Suburbs 65 (D. Brown 6 + 9 tries, D. Brown 10 Goals) defeated Canterbury Bankstown 10 (Sponberg, Burdon Tries; Carey 2 Goals) at Pratten Park.
- Premiership Round 16, Eastern Suburbs 53 beat North Sydney 15 at Sydney Cricket Ground.
- Premiership Round 17, Eastern Suburbs 21 defeated South Sydney 9 (McCormack Try; Percy Williams 3 Goals) at Sydney Cricket Ground.
- Premiership Round 18, Eastern Suburbs 53 (Brown 6 + 7 tries; 7 goals) defeated Balmain 13 at Sydney Cricket Ground.
  The first of Dave Browns 6 tries in this match took him past Dally Messengers point scoring record for the most points scored in a season.

== Ladder ==
	Team	Pld	W	D	L	B	PF	PA	PD	Pts
1	Eastern Suburbs	16	15	0	1	2	599	157	+442	34
2	South Sydney	16	11	0	5	2	314	222	+112	26
3	Western Suburbs	16	10	0	6	2	345	243	+102	24
4	North Sydney	16	9	1	6	2	248	253	-5	23
5	Balmain	16	8	1	7	2	320	225	+95	21
6	St. George	16	8	0	8	2	334	162	+172	20
7	Newtown	16	8	0	8	2	280	648	+32	20
8	Canterbury-Bankstown	16	2	0	14	2	150	660	-510	8
9	University	16	0	0	16	2	109	529	-420	4

- Premiership Semi final, Eastern Suburbs 15 (M. Nixon, R. Mckinnon, F. Tottey Tries; R. Mckinnon 3 Goals) defeated Western Suburbs 10 (V. Sheehan, F. Comber Tries; L. Mead 2 Goals) at ????

== Season highlights ==
- The 1935 Eastern Suburbs side averaging over 37 points a match.
- Dave Brown was the New South Wales Rugby League's leading try and point scorer, although playing in just 15 premiership matches that season he scored an amazing 38 tries.

Preceded by 1934	Season; 1935	Succeeded by 1936
