= 1934 Eastern Suburbs season =

← 1933	1935 →

Eastern Suburbs (now known as the Sydney Roosters) finished as runners up in the 26th New South Wales Rugby League(NSWRL) premiership in the 1934 season.

== Details ==
Lineup: - Cyril Abotomey, Jack Beaton, Dave Brown(c), Frank Buchanan, John Clarke, Jack 'Buster' Craigie, Tom Dowling, T. Lang, J. Lane, Tom McLachlan, Max Nixon, Ernie Norman, Andy Norval, Joe Pearce, Henry 'Harry' Pierce, Ray Stehr, Viv Thicknesse, H. Thompson.

== Ladder ==
	Team	Pld	W	D	L	PF	PA	PD	Pts
1	Eastern Suburbs	14	12	0	2	308	165	+143	24
2	Western Suburbs	14	12	0	2	263	158	+105	24
3	St. George	14	9	0	5	251	166	+85	18
4	South Sydney	14	8	0	6	213	149	+64	16
5	Newtown	14	5	0	9	192	229	-37	10
6	North Sydney	14	5	0	9	194	234	-40	10
7	Balmain	14	4	0	10	206	275	-69	8
8	University	14	1	0	13	113	364	-251	2

== Season summary ==
- Eastern Suburbs were minor premiers and finished the season as runners up.
- Dave Brown was the New South Wales Rugby League(NSWRL)'s leading point scorer for the 1934 season.
- Dave Brown was the NSWRFL (equal) leading Try scorer in 1934 with 11 tries.

Preceded by 1933	Season; 1934	Succeeded by 1935
