= 1934 NSWRFL season =

Rugby league competition

1934 New South Wales Rugby Football League
- Teams: 8
- Premiers: Western Suburbs (2nd title)
- Minor premiers: Eastern Suburbs (5th title)
- Matches played: 60
- Points scored: 1823
- Top points scorer: Dave Brown (121)
- Wooden spoon: University (7th spoon)
- Top try-scorer(s): Dave Brown (11); Fred Gardner (11); Vic Hey (11)

The 1934 New South Wales Rugby Football League premiership was the twenty-seventh season of Sydney’s top-grade rugby league club competition, Australia’s first. Eight teams from across the city contested the premiership during the season which lasted from April until September and culminated in Western Suburbs’ victory over Eastern Suburbs in the premiership final.

== Season summary ==
At the height of The Depression, the New South Wales Rugby Football League again banned radio broadcasts of matches, blaming them for a severe drop in crowd numbers.

In Round 2 the University club began a losing streak which would run until the fourteenth round of the 1936 season, marking the record for the most consecutive losses in premiership history at 42.

=== Teams ===
- Balmain, formed on January 23, 1908, at Balmain Town Hall
- Eastern Suburbs, formed on January 24, 1908, at Paddington Town Hall
- Newtown, formed on January 14, 1908
- North Sydney, formed on February 7, 1908
- South Sydney, formed on January 17, 1908, at Redfern Town Hall
- St. George, formed on November 8, 1920, at Kogarah School of Arts
- Western Suburbs, formed on February 4, 1908
- University, formed in 1919 at Sydney University

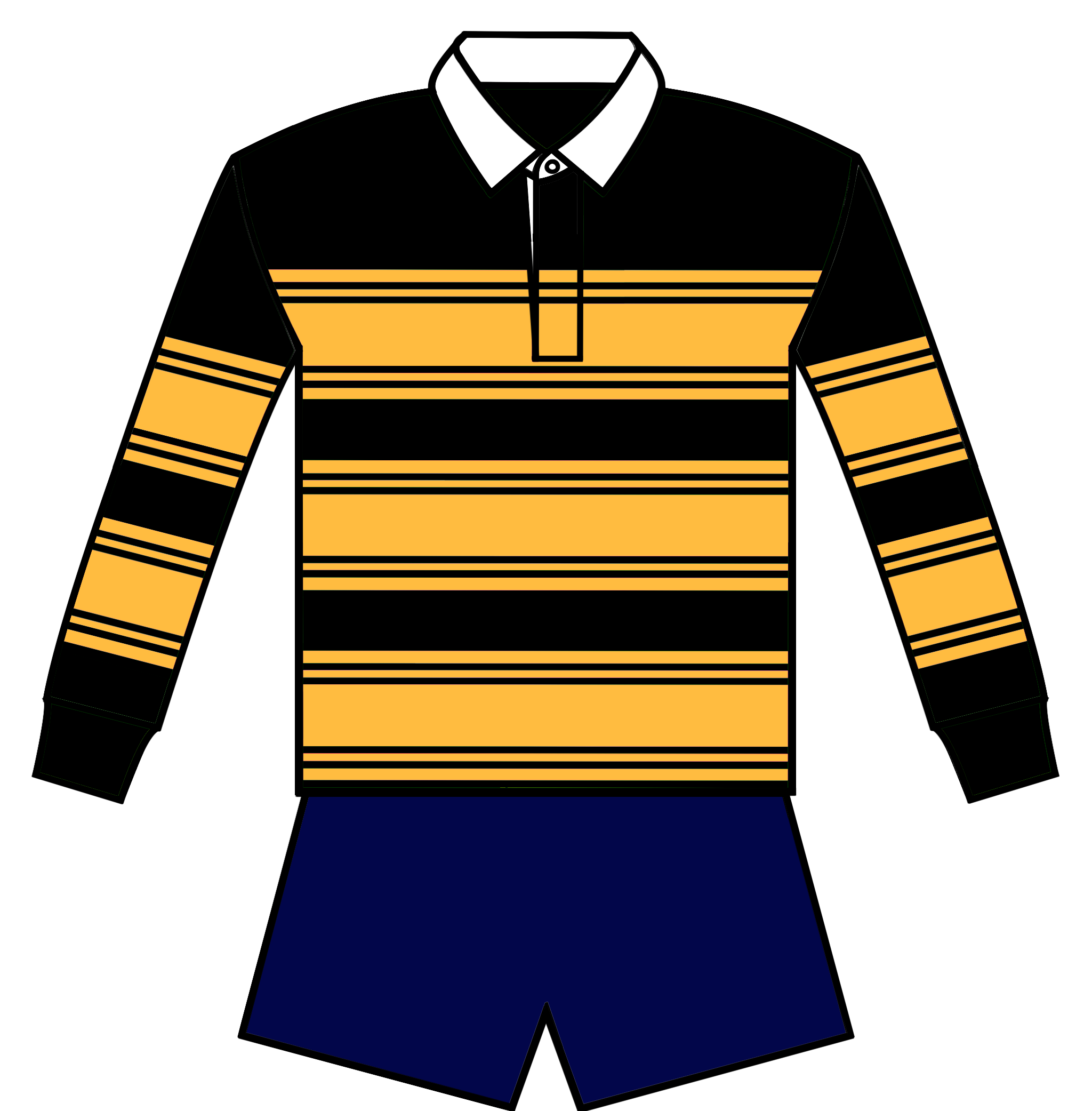
Balmain 27th season Ground: Leichhardt Oval; Coach: George Robinson; Captain: Syd Christensen

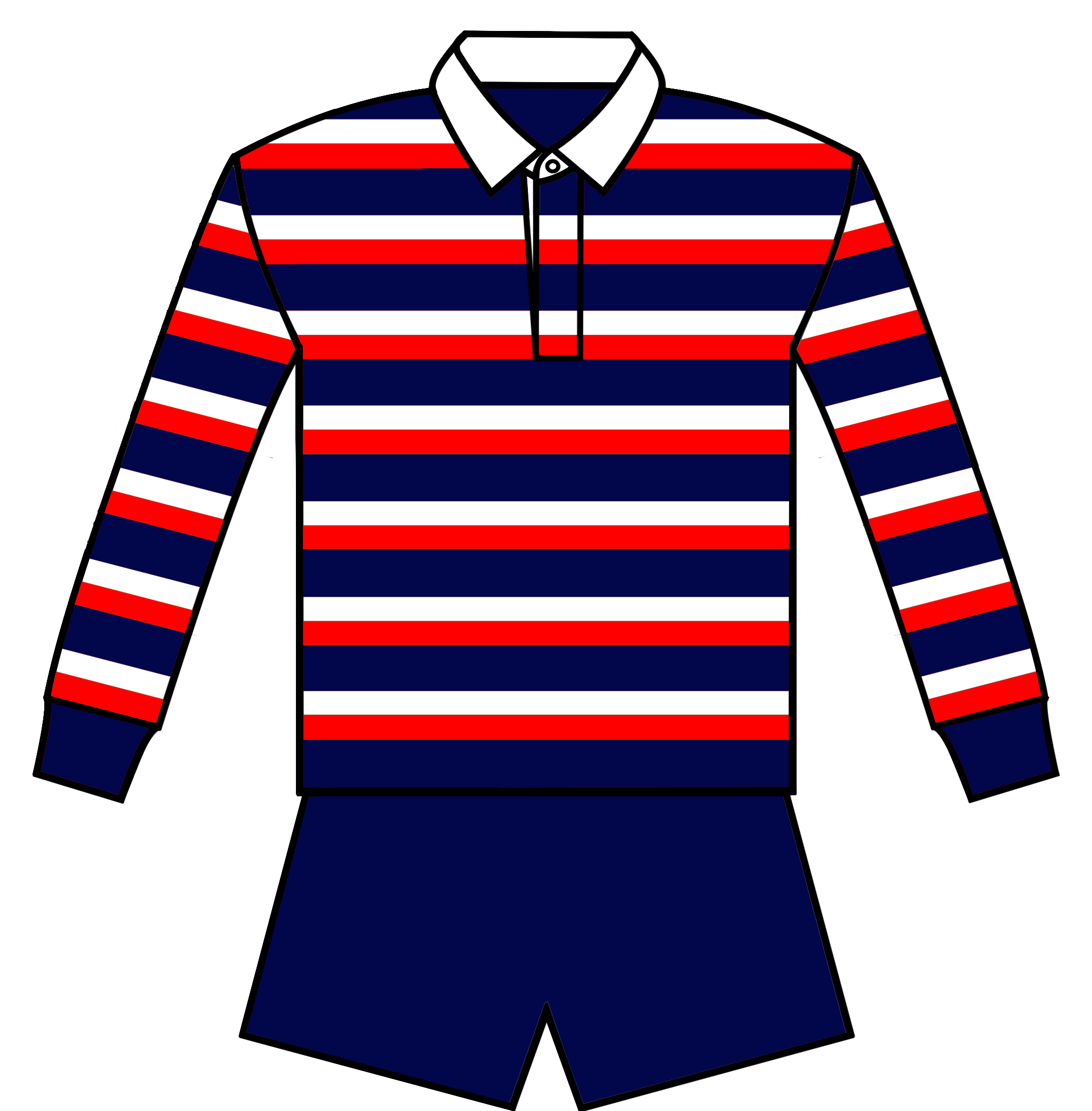
Eastern Suburbs 27th season Ground: Trumper Oval, Sports Ground; Coach: Arthur Halloway; Captain: Dave Brown

Newtown 27th season Ground: Marrickville Oval; Coach: Charles Russell; Captain: Keith Ellis

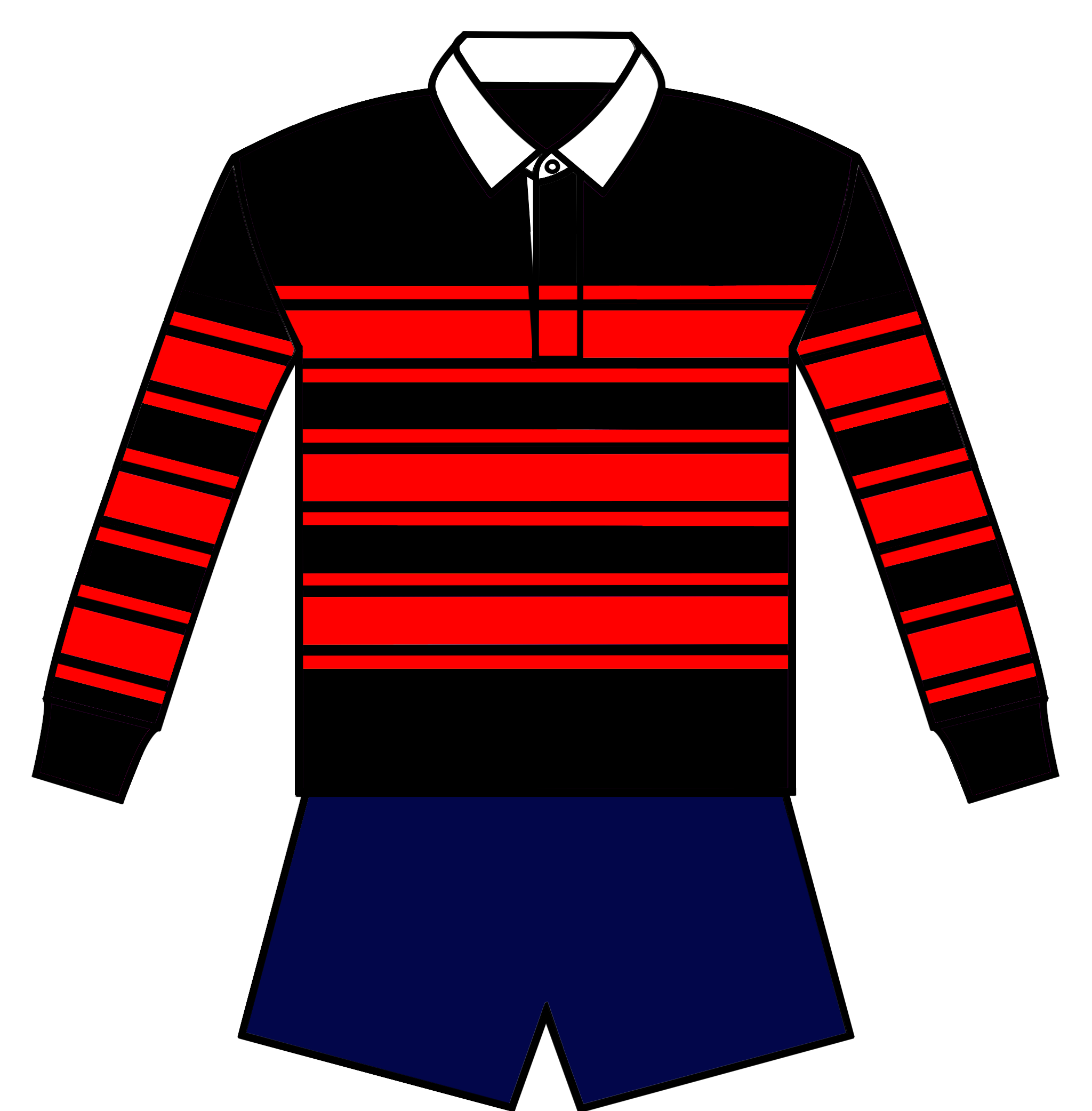
North Sydney 27th season Ground: North Sydney Oval; Coach: Herman Peters; Captain: Doug Deitz

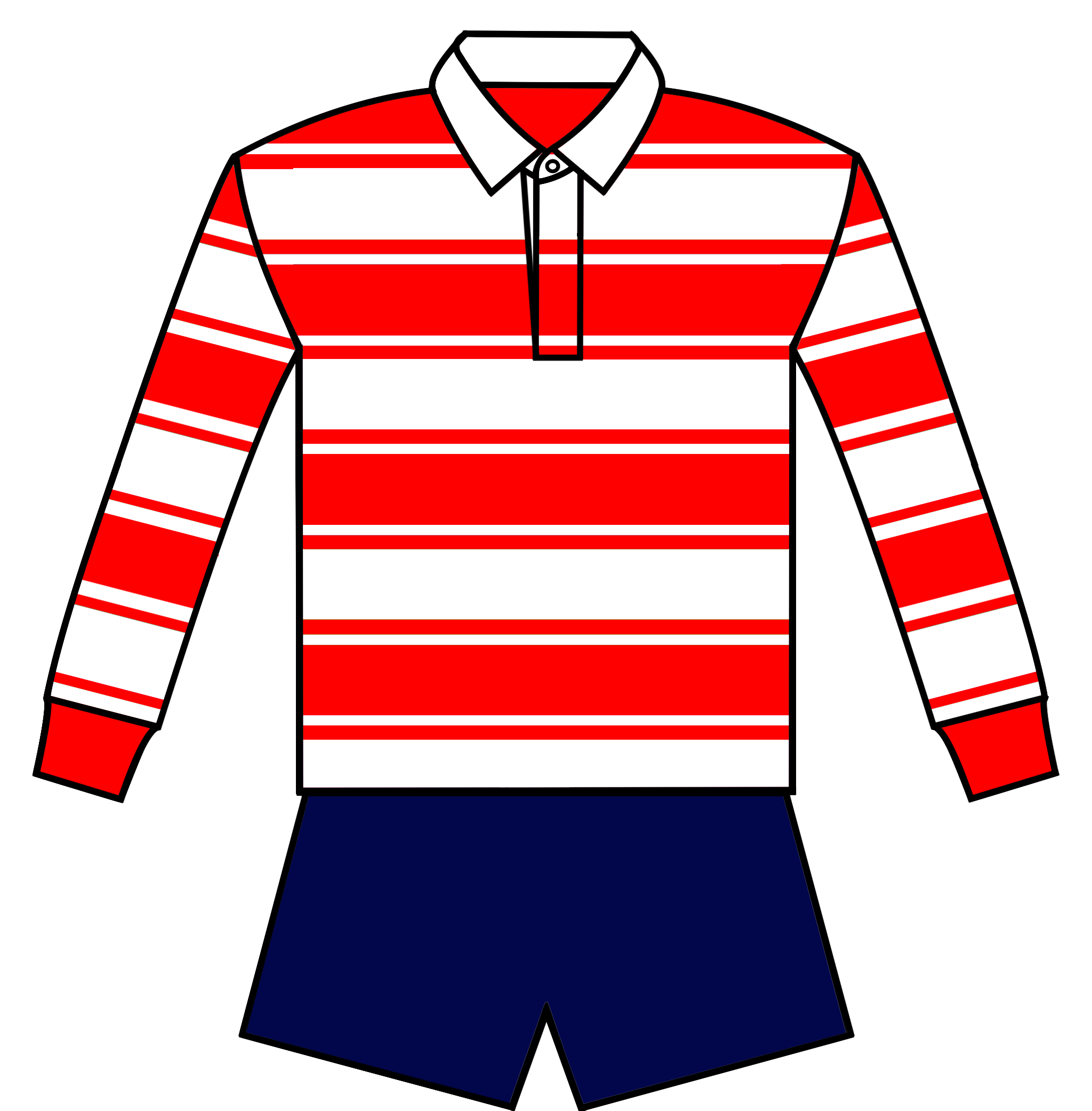
St. George 14th season Ground: Earl Park; Coach: Albert Johnston; Captain: Harry Kadwell

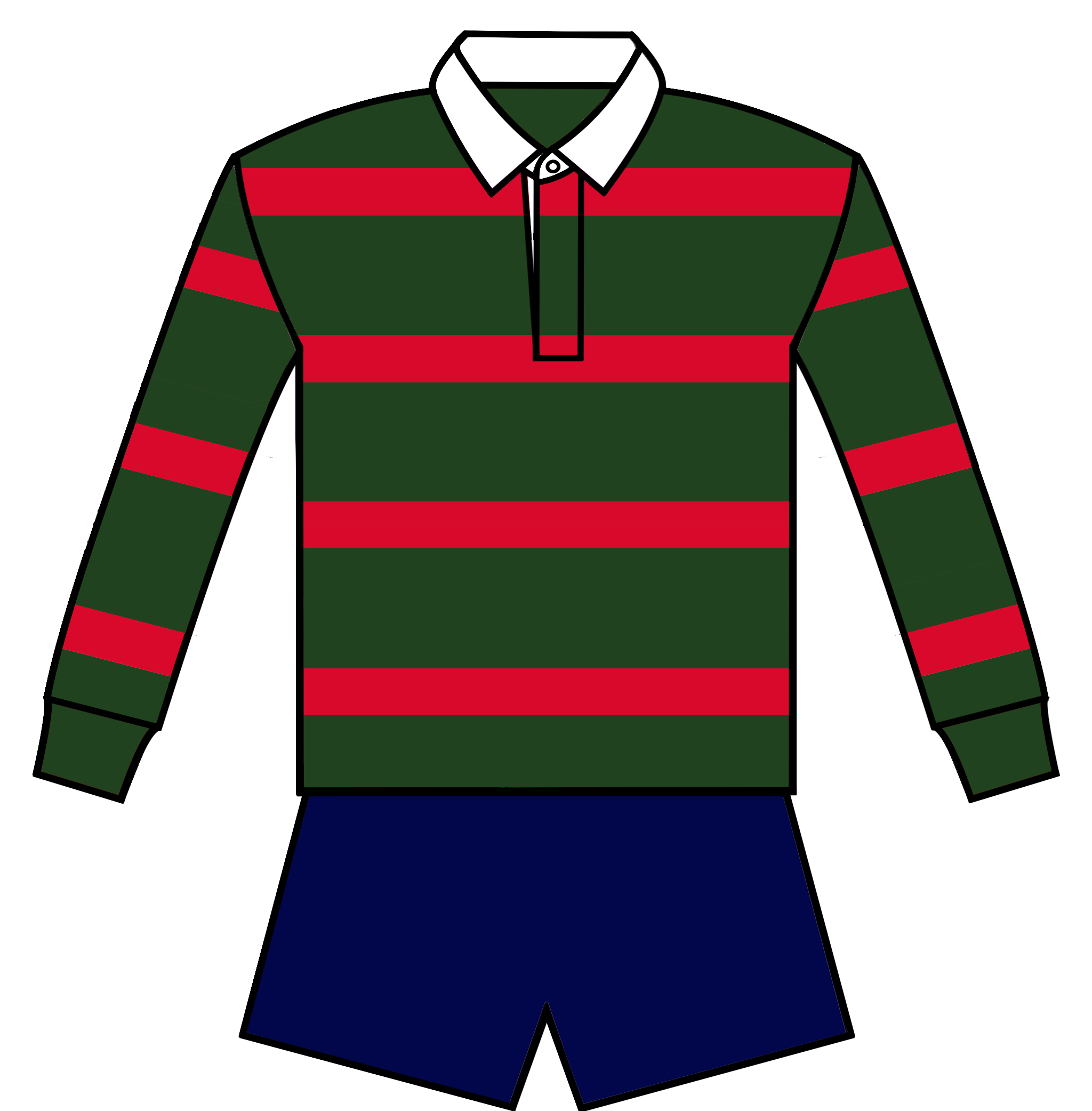
South Sydney 27th season Ground: Sports Ground; Coach: Charlie Lynch; Captain: George Treweek

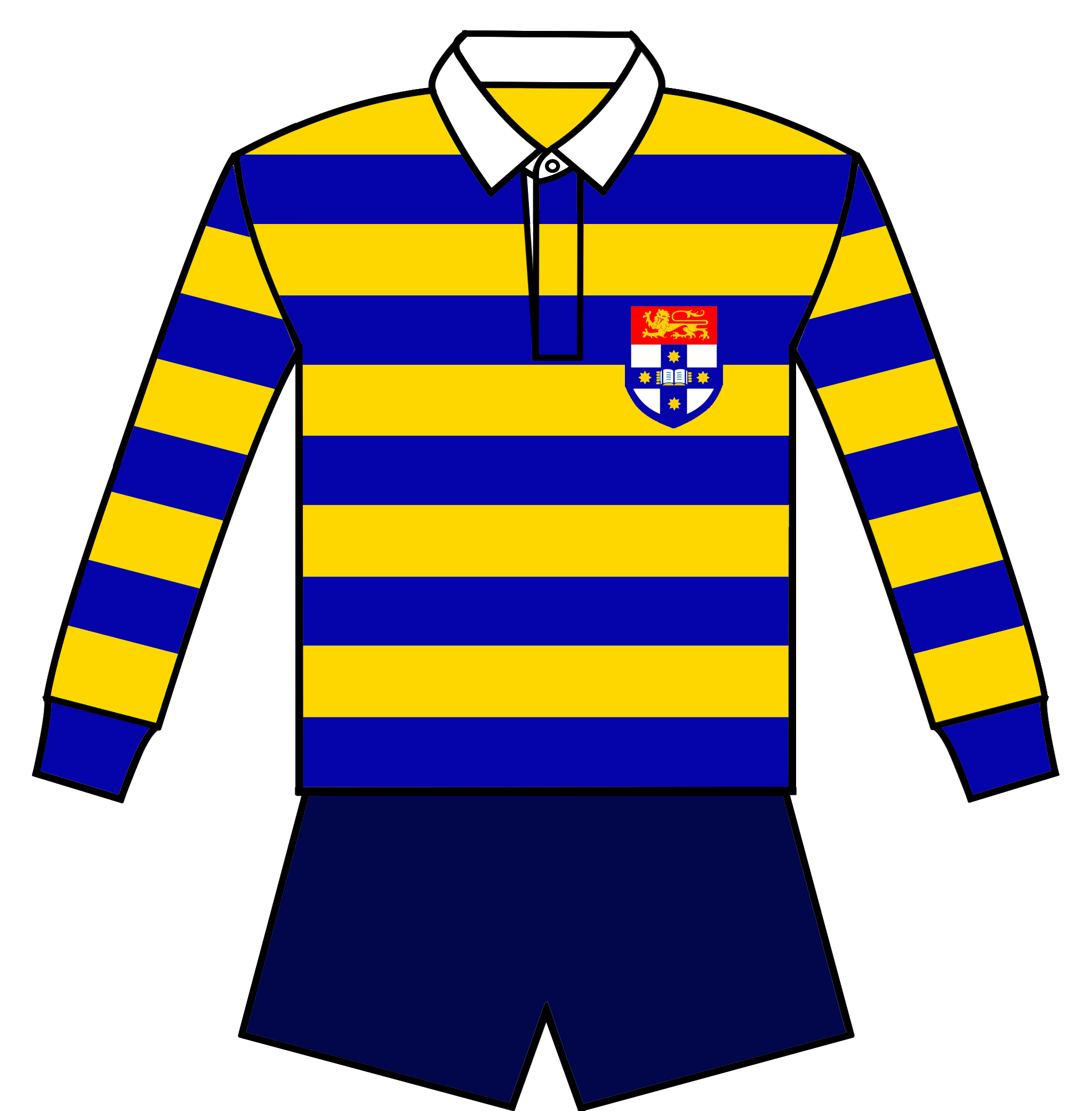
University 15th season Captain-Coach: Gordon Favelle

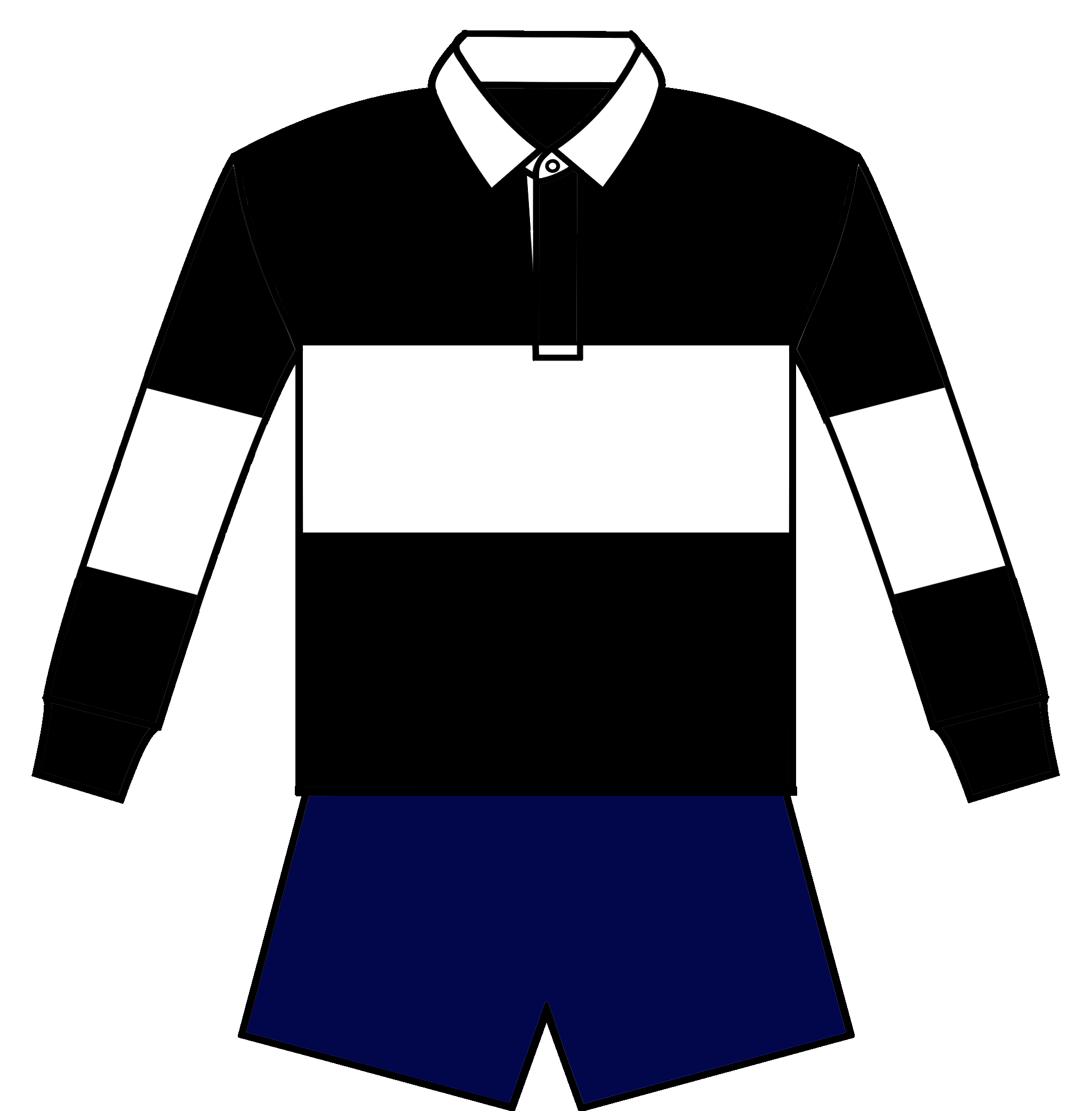
Western Suburbs 27th season Ground: Pratten Park; Captain-coach: Frank McMillan

=== Ladder ===
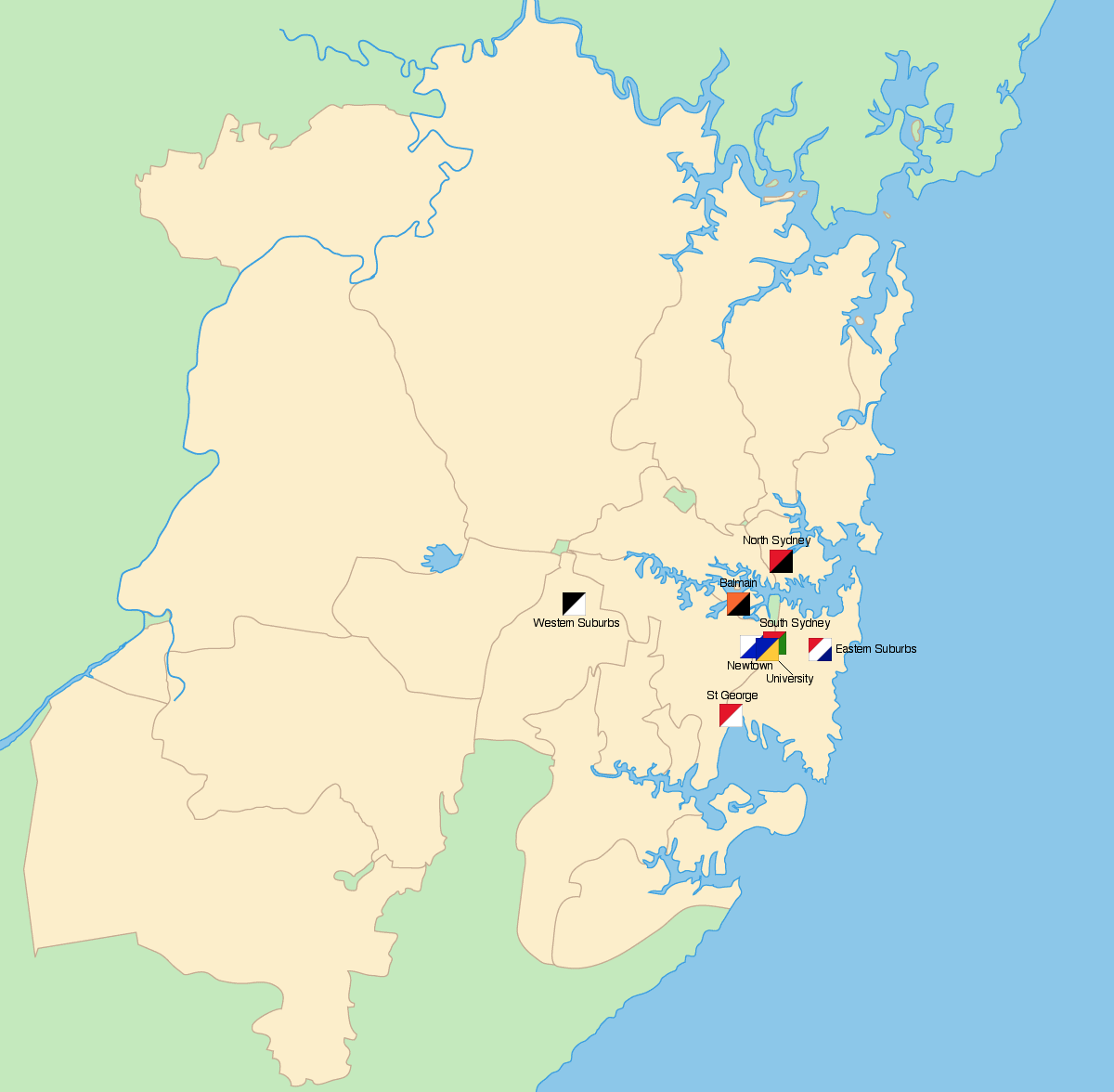
The geographical locations of the teams that contested the 1934 premiership across Sydney.

| | Team | Pld | W | D | L | PF | PA | PD | Pts |
|---|---|---|---|---|---|---|---|---|---|
| 1 | Eastern Suburbs | 14 | 12 | 0 | 2 | 308 | 165 | +143 | 24 |
| 2 | Western Suburbs | 14 | 12 | 0 | 2 | 263 | 158 | +105 | 24 |
| 3 | St. George | 14 | 9 | 0 | 5 | 251 | 166 | +85 | 18 |
| 4 | South Sydney | 14 | 8 | 0 | 6 | 213 | 149 | +64 | 16 |
| 5 | Newtown | 14 | 5 | 0 | 9 | 192 | 229 | -37 | 10 |
| 6 | North Sydney | 14 | 5 | 0 | 9 | 194 | 234 | -40 | 10 |
| 7 | Balmain | 14 | 4 | 0 | 10 | 206 | 275 | -69 | 8 |
| 8 | Sydney University | 14 | 1 | 0 | 13 | 113 | 364 | -251 | 2 |

== Finals ==
In the two semi finals, the top two ranked teams Western Suburbs and Eastern Suburbs beat their lower-ranked opponents St. George and South Sydney. The two winners then played in a final in which Western beat Eastern Suburbs.

Semi-finals
18 August 1934 - Sports Ground
Western Suburbs | 16
St. George | 6
25 August 1934 - Sports Ground
Eastern Suburbs | 19
South Sydney | 6

Final
8 September 1934 - Sports Ground
Western Suburbs | 15
Eastern Suburbs | 12

=== Premiership Final ===
| Eastern Suburbs | Position | Western Suburbs |
|---|---|---|
| 13. Tom Dowling | FB | 1. Frank McMillan (Ca./Co.) |
| 12. John Lane | WG | 2. Alan Ridley |
| 11. Dave Brown (c) | CE | 9. Charlie Cornwell |
| 10. Jack Beaton | CE | 4. Stan Tancred |
| 42. Harry Thompson | WG | 5. Alan Brady |
| 8. Ernie Norman | FE | 6. Vic Hey |
| 7. Viv Thicknesse | HB | 7. Les Mead |
| 16. Ray Stehr | PR | 10. Jack McConnell |
| 1. Tom McLachlan | HK | 12. Bob Lindfield |
| 3. Max Nixon | PR | 13. Alan Blake |
| 4. Harry Pierce | SR | 3. Vince Sheehan |
| 5. Joe Pearce | SR | 17. Max Gray |
| 6. Andy Norval | LK | 8. Frank Sponberg |
| Arthur Halloway | Coach | |

After a hurried conference on Saturday, 1 September 1934, the league postponed the final for a week because of heavy rain and adverse ground conditions. It was the first postponement in the competition’s twenty-seven-year history. Eastern Suburbs players Viv Thicknesse and Stan Tancred made a return for the final which was refereed by J Murphy before a crowd of 25,174.

Western Suburbs captain Frank McMillan won the toss and ran with the wind before Les Mead opened with a penalty goal. Regular stoppages for infringements ensued before Jack Beaton kicked accurately to level the match at 2–2. Western Suburbs Test winger Alan Ridley scored the first try of the match, crashing over on the right wing after powering through the defence. McMillan’s conversion made it 7–2, with the score remaining unchanged at halftime.

After the break, Thicknesse hit back for Eastern Suburbs and crossed after excellent lead up work by Joe Pearce. Beaton missed the conversion but Dave Brown steered through a penalty from a scrum infringement shortly after and the scores were level at 7–7. Rain began to fall as Western Suburbs gathered momentum. The play shifted to Easts’ line and Vince Sheehan crossed for an unconverted try and Western Suburbs led 10–7. Eastern Suburbs continued to defend grimly before Western Suburbs surged to a comfortable 15–7 lead. Vic Hey received a lobbed pass and got the ball to Alan Ridley who scored under the upright for Mead to convert. The Roosters’ chances came in the final stages and Andy Norval crossed for his team’s second try, although the referee appeared to miss a blatant knock-on. Beaton converted but it was all too late, with Western Suburbs claiming their second premiership.

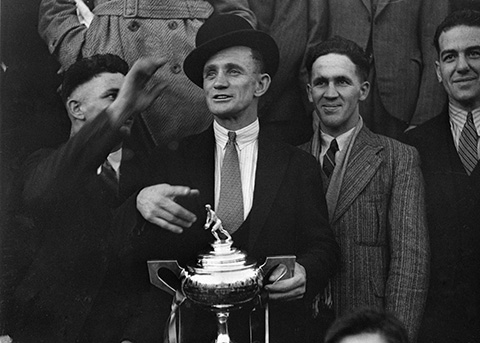
Frank McMillan 1934 premiership winning captain, to his right Alan Brady and Charlie Cornwell

A victory by a team who upset the Eastern Suburbs, who went on to win the next three titles. Alan Ridley played one of the best games for Western Suburbs along with team-mates Mead, Hey, Brady, Tancred. Current test skipper Frank McMillan (141 games) and hooker Bob Lindfield (138 matches) announced their retirement after the victory and were chaired from the field by team-mates.

Western Suburbs 15 (Tries: Alan Ridley 2, Vince Sheehan. Goals: Les Mead 2, Frank McMillan)

Eastern Suburbs 12 (Tries: Andy Norval, Viv Thicknesse. Goals: Jack Beaton 2, Dave Brown)
