= 1936 NSWRFL season =

Rugby league competition

1936 New South Wales Rugby Football League
- Teams: 9
- Premiers: Eastern Suburbs (6th title)
- Minor premiers: Eastern Suburbs (7th title)
- Matches played: 63
- Points scored: 1956
- Top points scorer(s): Syd Christensen (123)
- Wooden spoon: University (9th spoon)
- Top try-scorer(s): Fred Tottey (25)

The 1936 New South Wales Rugby Football League premiership was the twenty-ninth season of Sydney’s top-level rugby league football club competition, Australia’s first. Nine teams from across the city contested the premiership during the season, which lasted from April until September, and culminated in Eastern Suburbs’ victory over Balmain in the final.

== Season summary ==
In round 14 of the University club ended a losing streak which had begun round 2, 1934 and marked the most consecutive losses in NSWRL/NRL premiership history at 42. Eastern Suburbs went through 1936 undefeated – a feat achieved by teams in only five other seasons before or since.

The first premiership game of Rugby League at Henson Park was played on 1 April 1936, when Newtown defeated University 20–0.

For the first time since 1919 and only the second since the competition began South Sydney lost more games than it won.

=== Teams ===
- Balmain, formed on 23 January 1908 at Balmain Town Hall
- Canterbury-Bankstown
- Eastern Suburbs, formed on 24 January 1908 at Paddington Town Hall
- Newtown, formed on 14 January 1908
- North Sydney, formed on 7 February 1908
- South Sydney, formed on 17 January 1908 at Redfern Town Hall
- St. George, formed on 8 November 1920 at Kogarah School of Arts
- University, formed in 1919 at Sydney University
- Western Suburbs, formed on 4 February 1908

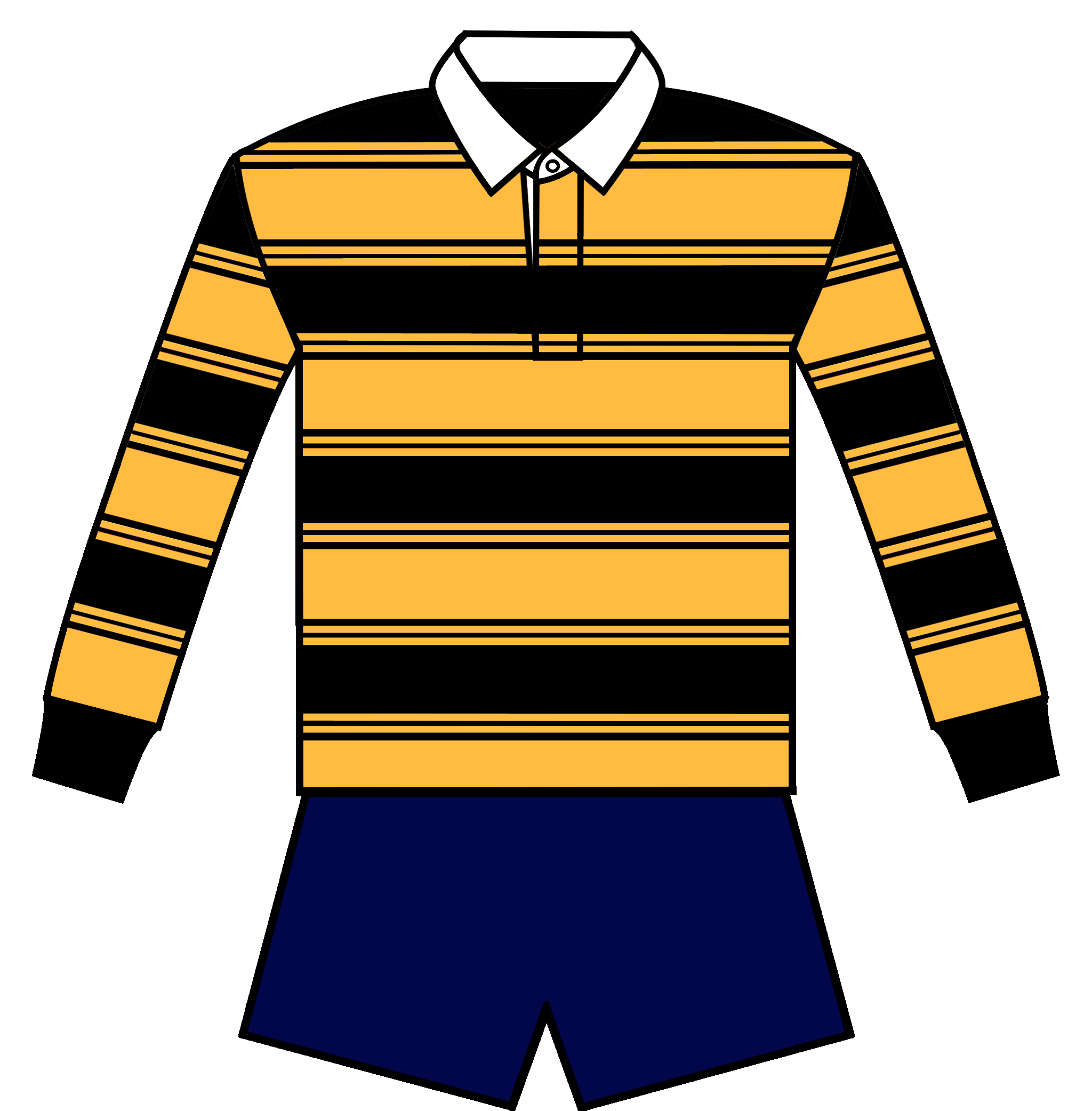
Balmain 29th season Ground: Leichhardt Oval; Coach: Joe Busch; Captain: Syd Christensen

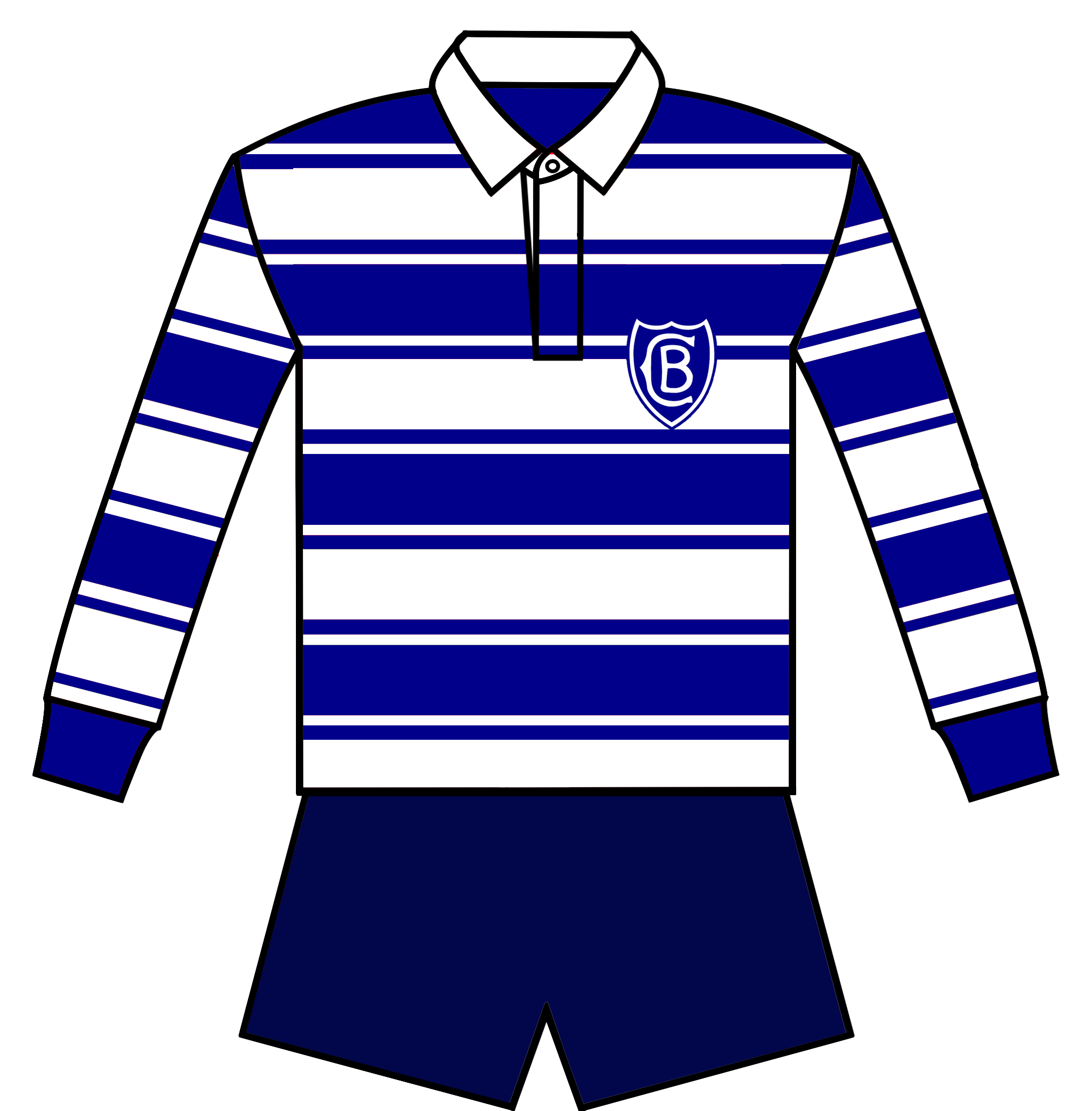
Canterbury-Bankstown 2nd season Ground: Belmore Sports Ground; Coach: Frank Burge; Captain: Alan Brady

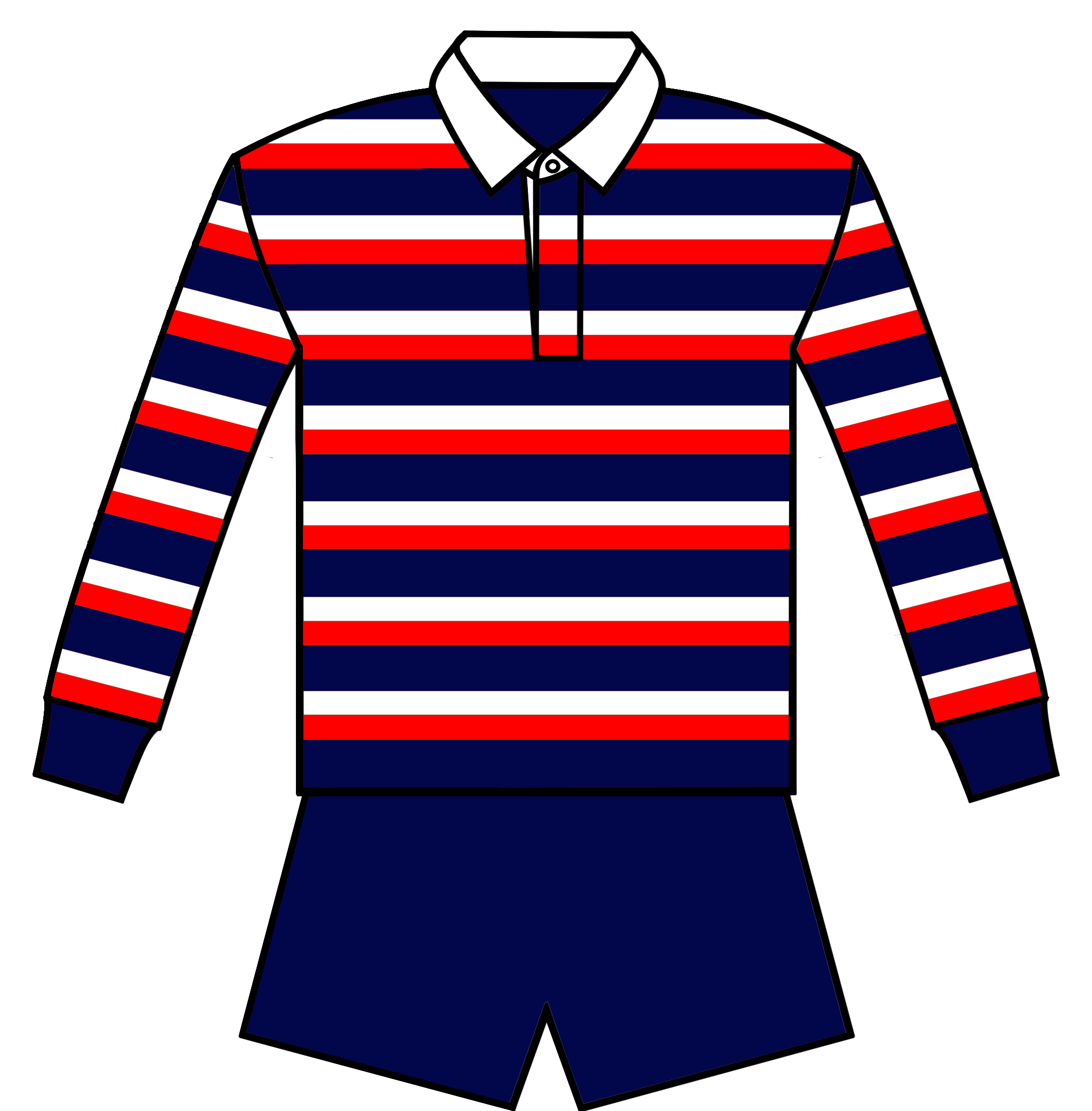
Eastern Suburbs 29th season Ground: Sydney Sports Ground; Coach: Arthur Halloway; Captain: Dave Brown

Newtown 29th season Ground: Henson Park; Coach: Bill Kelly; Captain: Hans Mork

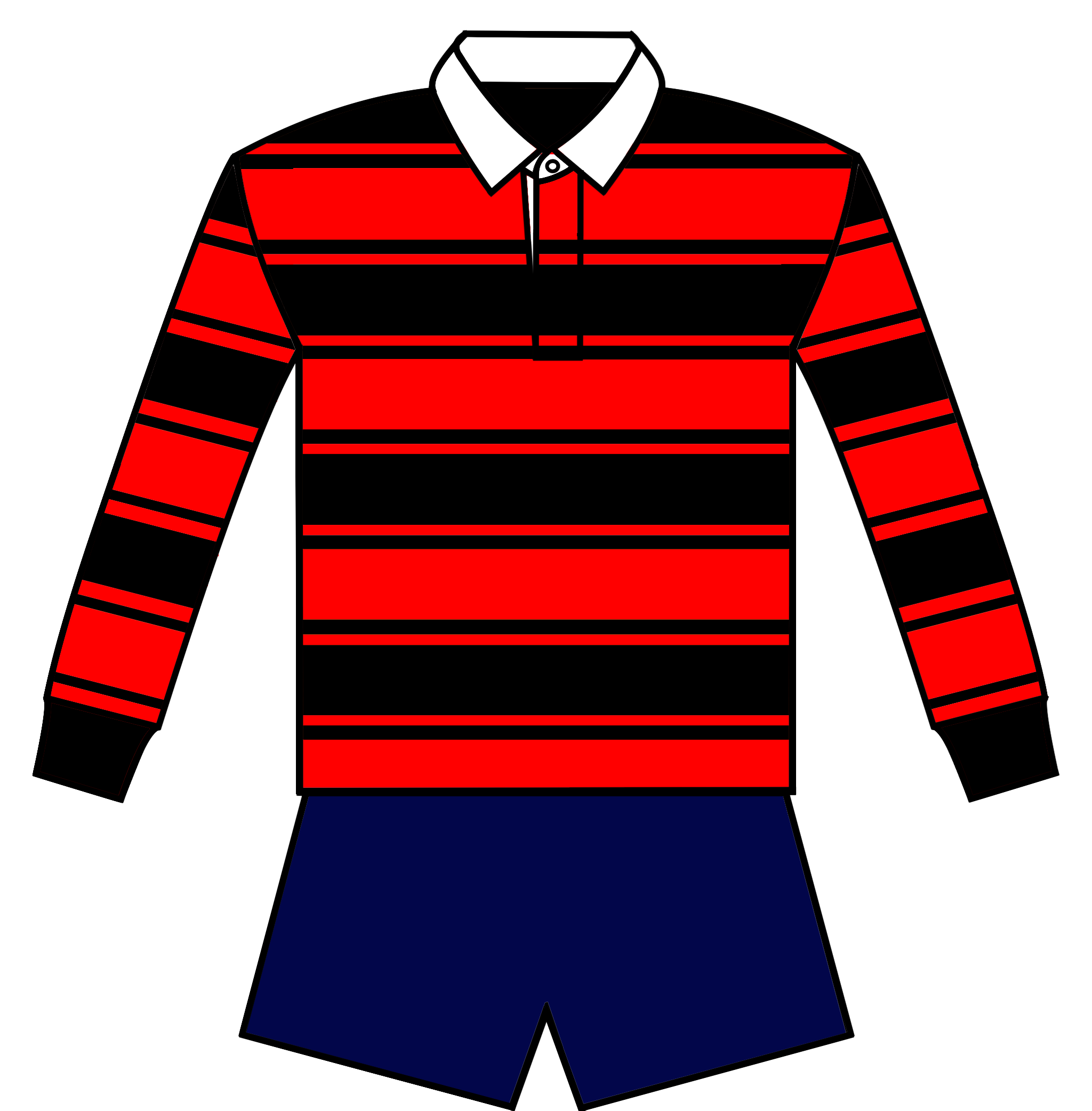
North Sydney 29th season Ground: North Sydney Oval; Coach: Jim Craig; Captain: Rex Harrison

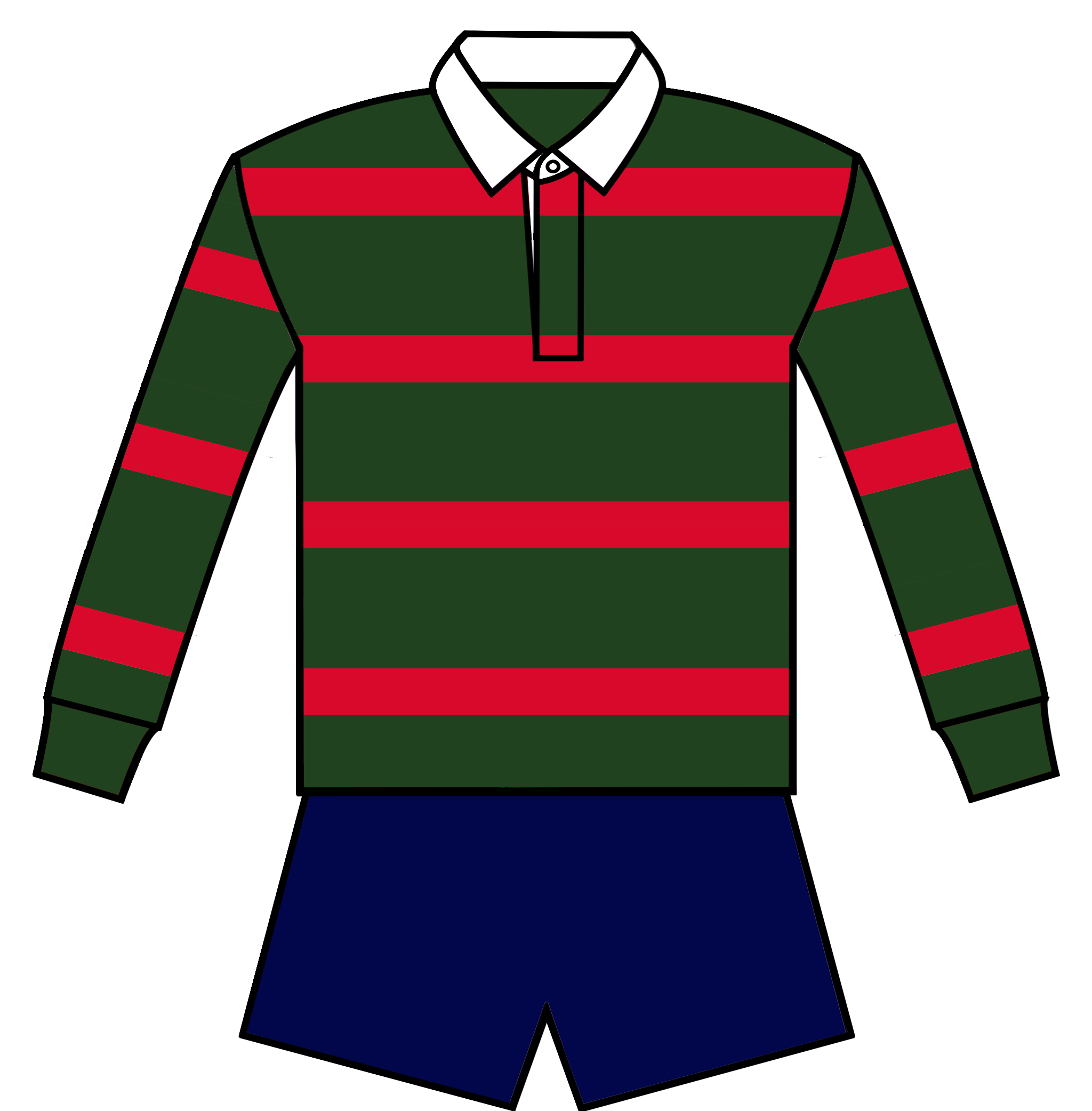
South Sydney 29th season Ground: Sydney Sports Ground; Coach: Dave Watson; Captain: Eric Lewis

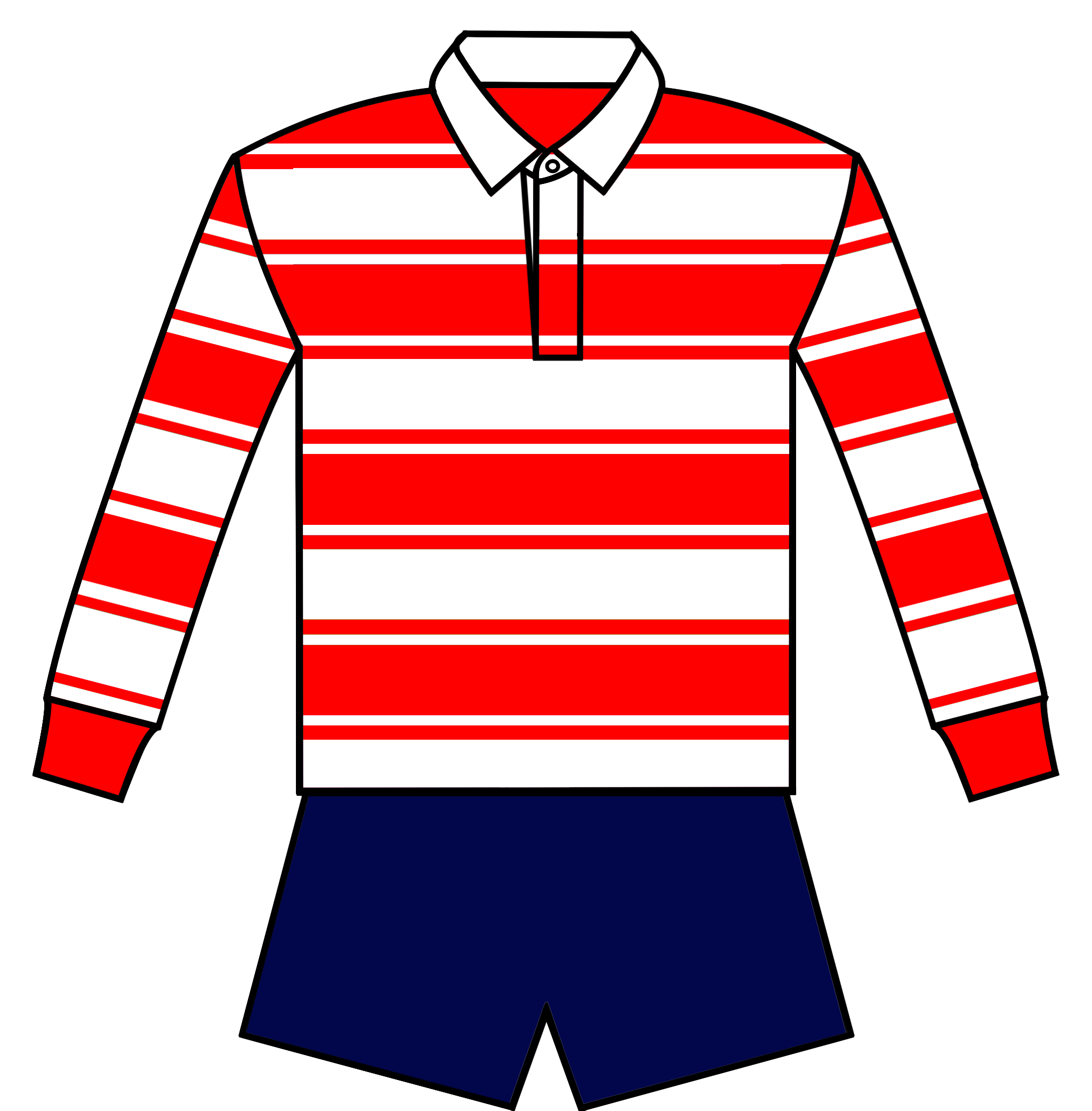
St. George 16th season Ground: Earl Park; Coach: Arthur Justice / Eddie Root; Captain: Eddie Root

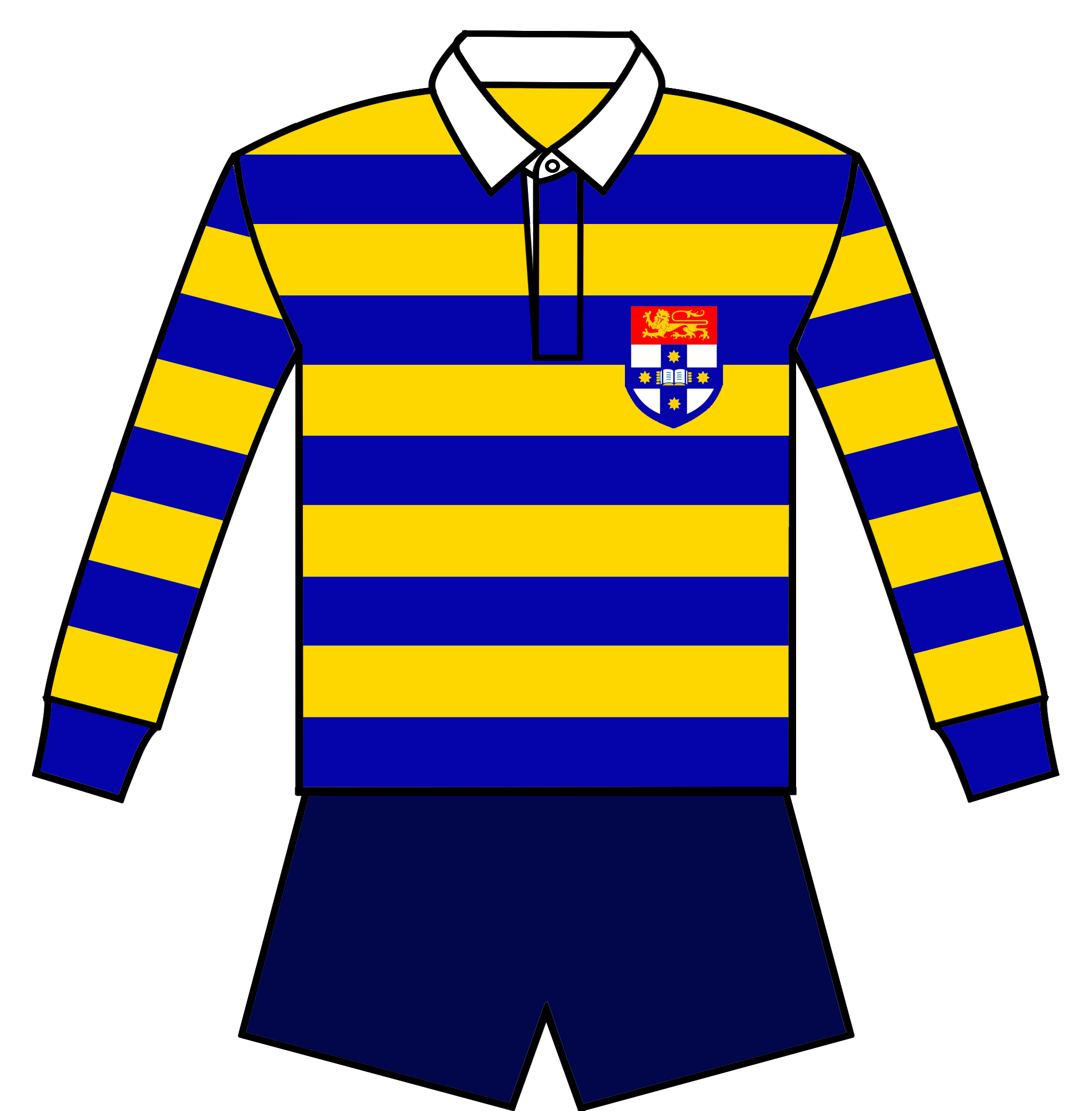
University 17th Season; Coach: Bob Williams; Captain: Leo Reddy

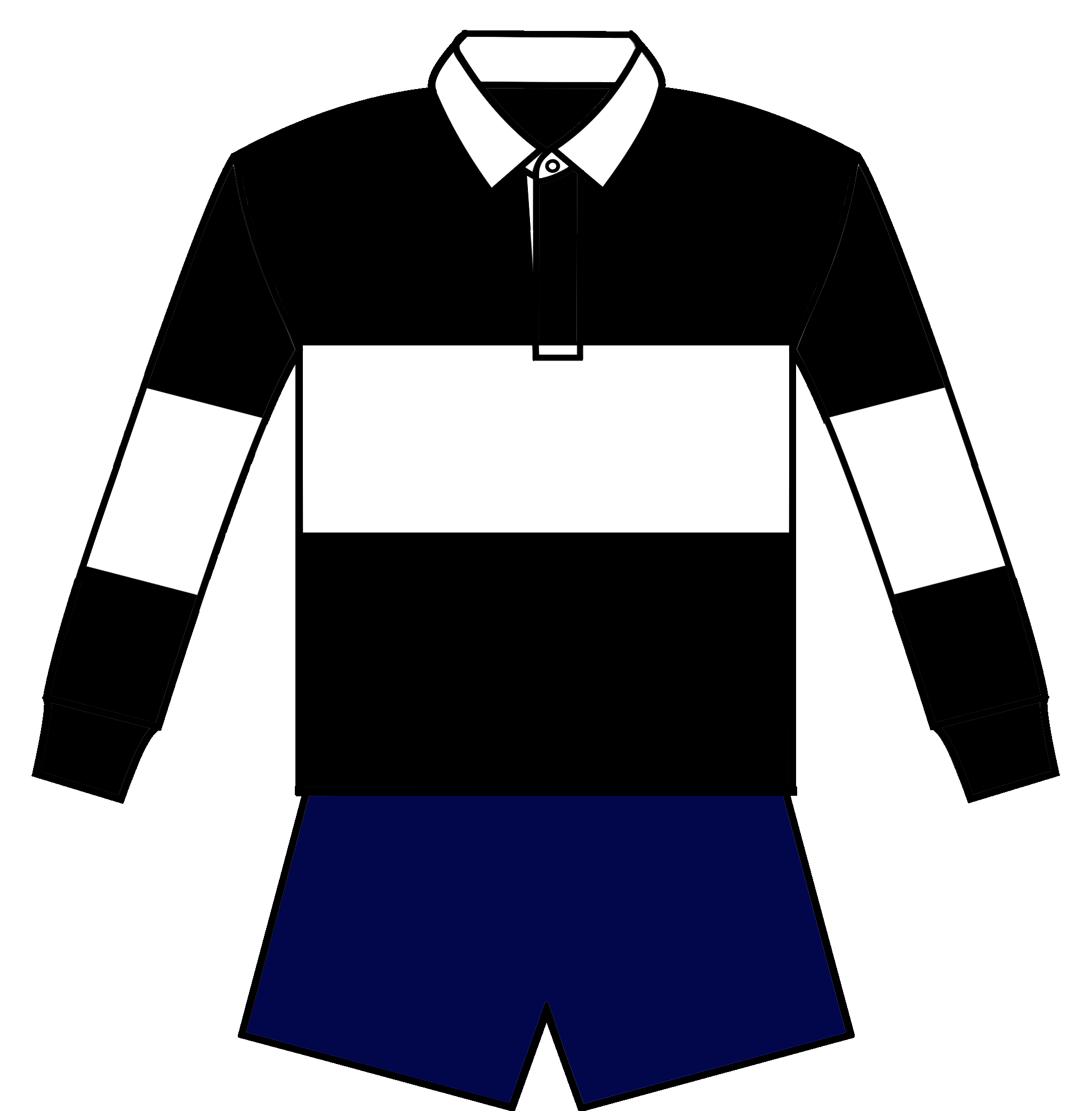
Western Suburbs 29th season Ground: Pratten Park; Coach: Frank McMillan; Captain: Cliff Pearce

=== Ladder ===
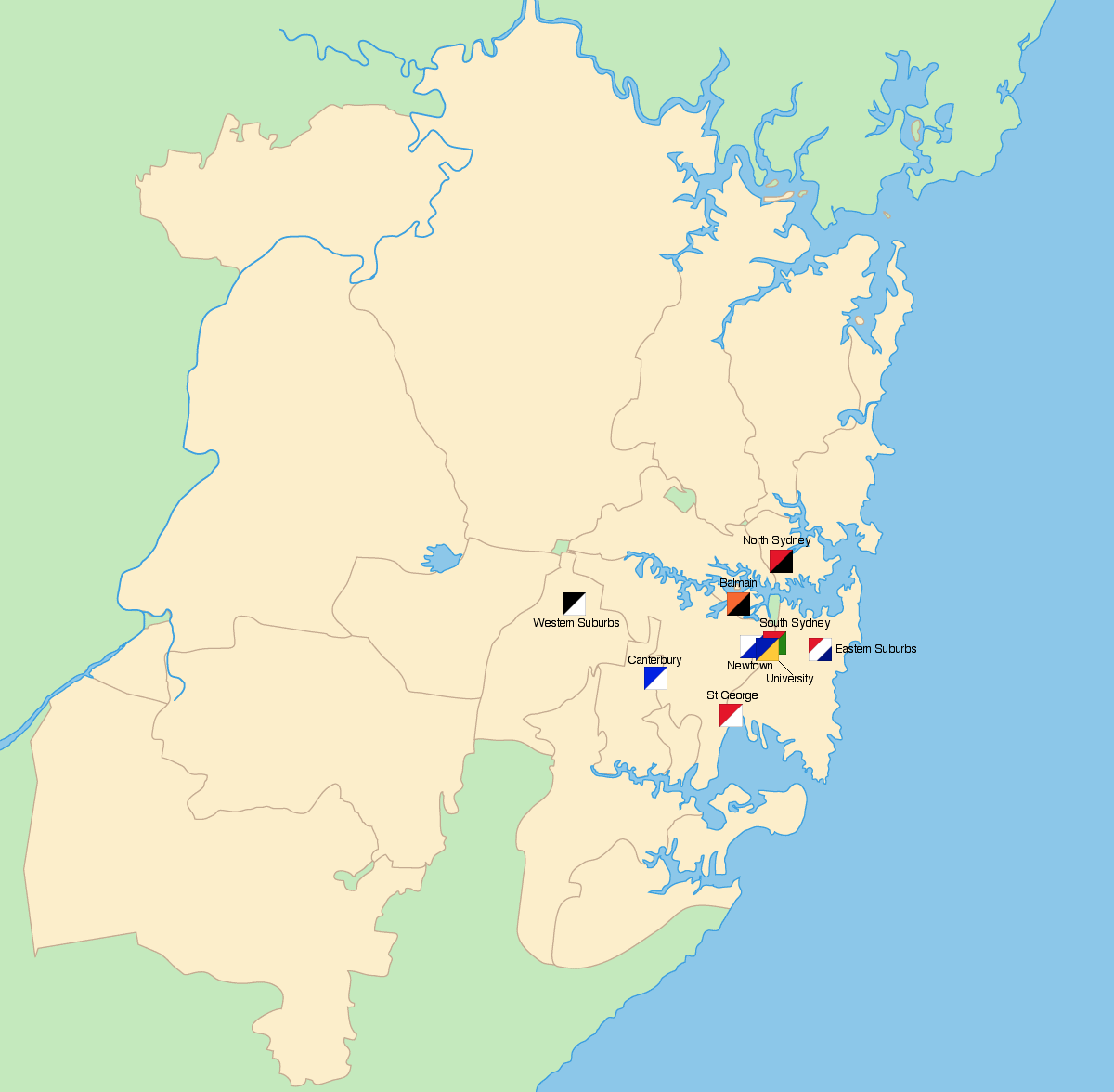
The geographical locations of the teams that contested the 1936 premiership across Sydney.

	Team	Pld	W	D	L	B	PF	PA	PD	Pts
1	Eastern Suburbs	13	11	2	0	2	335	145	+190	28
2	Balmain	13	9	0	4	2	268	161	+107	22
3	Canterbury	14	9	2	3	1	213	132	+81	22
4	North Sydney	13	7	1	5	2	210	161	+49	19
5	Newtown	14	7	0	7	1	203	226	-23	16
6	Western Suburbs	13	5	1	7	2	199	203	-4	15
7	South Sydney	13	5	0	8	2	187	185	+2	14
8	St. George	13	3	0	10	2	141	228	-87	10
9	Sydney University	14	1	0	13	1	99	414	-315	4

== Finals ==
In the two semi finals, the top two ranked teams Eastern Suburbs and Balmain beat their lower-ranked opponents North Sydney and Canterbury-Bankstown. Eastern Suburbs and Balmain then played off for the premiership in the Final.

Semi-finals
September 1936 - Sports Ground
Balmain	16
North Sydney	3
September 1936 - Sports Ground
Eastern Suburbs	25
Canterbury-Bankstown	13

Final
12 September 1936 - Sports Ground
Eastern Suburbs	32
Balmain	12

=== Premiership Final ===
Eastern Suburbs	Position	Balmain
13. Tom Dowling	FB	14. Frank Johnston
12. Rod O'Loan	WG	2. Sid Goodwin
11. Dave Brown (c)	CE	15. Gus Reeves
23. Jack Lynch	CE	32. Eddie Lockhart
9. Fred Tottey	WG	3. Jack Redman
8. Ernie Norman	FE	5. Syd Christensen (c)
7. Viv Thicknesse	HB	6. Tom Grahame
32. Jack Coote	PR	10. Dave Manning
17. Tom McLachlan	HK	9. Bill Alexander
1. Ray Stehr	PR	8. Frank Griffiths
4. Harry Pierce	SR	21. Billy Johnson
5. Joe Pearce	SR	11. Edmund Beaver
6. Andy Norval	LK	26. Roy Palmer
Arthur Halloway	Coach	Joe Busch

In front of a crowd of 14,395 at the Sydney Cricket Ground Easts were vying for back-to-back premierships and took on Balmain.

The match, officiated by referee Lal Deane was tight in the first half with a scoreline favouring Easts 8–6 at the break. In the second half Easts ran away with the game, scoring eight tries all up to Balmain's two.

The game marked the end of a sterling career for champion Tiger and former international halfback Joe “Chimpy” Busch, and was a suitable farewell for Roosters’ captain and star, Dave Brown. Brown headed to English club Warrington for two years, so that he did not play for the Tricolours during the 1937 and 1938 seasons.

Eastern Suburbs 32 (Tries: Fred Tottey 2, Rod O’Loan, Dave Brown, Ray Stehr, Ernie Norman, Jack Lynch, Andy Norval. Goals: Jack Lynch 2, Dave Brown 2 )

defeated

Balmain 12 (Tries: Frank Griffiths, Sid Goodwin. Goals: Sid Christensen 2, Bill Johnson)
