= 1932 Eastern Suburbs season =

← 1931	1933 →

Eastern Suburbs (now known as the Sydney Roosters) competed in the 25th New South Wales Rugby League (NSWRL) premiership in 1932.

== Details ==
- Coach - Frank Burge
- Line up - Cyril Abotomey, Perc Atkinson, Morrie Boyle, Dave Brown, Richard Brown, John Clarke, Gordon Fletcher, Hilton Delaney, J. Guinery, Billy Hong, Jack Lynch, Jack Morrison, Ernie Norman, Eugene Paillas, W. Rayner, Les Rogers, Sid 'Joe' Pearce, Roy Shankland, J. Spence, Ray Stehr, Viv Thicknesse, Fred Tottey,

== Ladder ==
	Team	Pld	W	D	L	PF	PA	PD	Pts
1	South Sydney	14	13	0	1	292	130	+162	26
2	Western Suburbs	14	11	0	3	321	156	+165	22
3	Eastern Suburbs	14	9	0	5	253	133	+120	18
4	Balmain	14	7	1	6	204	227	-23	15
5	Newtown	14	7	0	7	201	251	-50	14
6	St. George	14	4	1	9	140	203	-63	9
7	University	14	2	0	12	134	275	-141	4
8	North Sydney	14	2	0	12	147	317	-170	4

== Season summary ==
- Semifinalists

Preceded by 1931	Season; 1932	Succeeded by 1933
