= 1933 Eastern Suburbs season =

← 1932	1934 →

Eastern Suburbs (now known as the Sydney Roosters) competed in the 26th New South Wales Rugby League(NSWRL) premiership in 1933.

== Details ==
- Line-up contained - Arthur 'Pony' Holloway (coach); Cyril Abotomey, W. Anderton, Perc Atkinson, Sam Bryant, Dave Brown, Richard Brown, John Clarke, G. Court, Jack 'Buster' Cragie, Hilton Delaney, Bill Dyer, Jack Fay, J. Guinery, Bob Halloway, Harley Hanrahan, John Lane, Jack Morrison, Max Nixon, Ernie Norman, Sid ' Joe' Pearce, Ray Stehr, Viv Thicknesse, Harry Thompsons, Fred Tottey, Laurie Ward, Wood

== Ladder ==
	Team	Pld	W	D	L	PF	PA	PD	Pts
1	Newtown	14	9	0	5	183	125	+58	18
2	Eastern Suburbs	14	8	1	5	224	169	+55	17
3	South Sydney	14	8	1	5	182	177	+5	17
4	St. George	14	8	0	6	165	174	-9	16
5	Balmain	14	5	3	5	187	210	-23	13
6	University	14	5	1	8	218	216	+2	11
7	North Sydney	14	5	1	8	136	188	-52	11
8	Western Suburbs	14	4	1	9	210	246	-36	9

Preceded by 1932	Season; 1933	Succeeded by 1934
