= Alan Blake (rugby league) =

Australian rugby league player

Personal information
- Full name: Alan Blake

Playing information
- Position: Prop, Second-row
Club
Years	Team	Pld	T	G	FG	P
1933–35	Western Suburbs	24	1	0	0	3

Alan Blake was an Australian Rugby League footballer who played in the 1930s. He played for the Western Suburbs Magpies in the NSWRL competition.

== Playing career ==
Blake made his first grade debut for Western Suburbs in Round 10 1933 against Newtown at Pratten Park. In 1934, Western Suburbs went from wooden spooners in 1933 to winning the minor premiership and premiership in 1934.

Blake played in the 1934 grand final victory over Eastern Suburbs at the Sydney Sports Ground. The final had been delayed for over a week due to heavy rain and Wests went into the match as underdogs with Easts boasting players such as future immortal David Brown, Viv Thicknesse and Ray Stehr. As of the 2019 season, no other team since Western Suburbs has come from last place to winning the premiership the following year.

Blake played on in 1935 featuring in 9 games as Western Suburbs reached the semi-final against Eastern Suburbs but were defeated 15-10 ending their title defense. This would also prove to be Blake's last game for the club.
