= Rod O'Loan =

Australian rugby league footballer

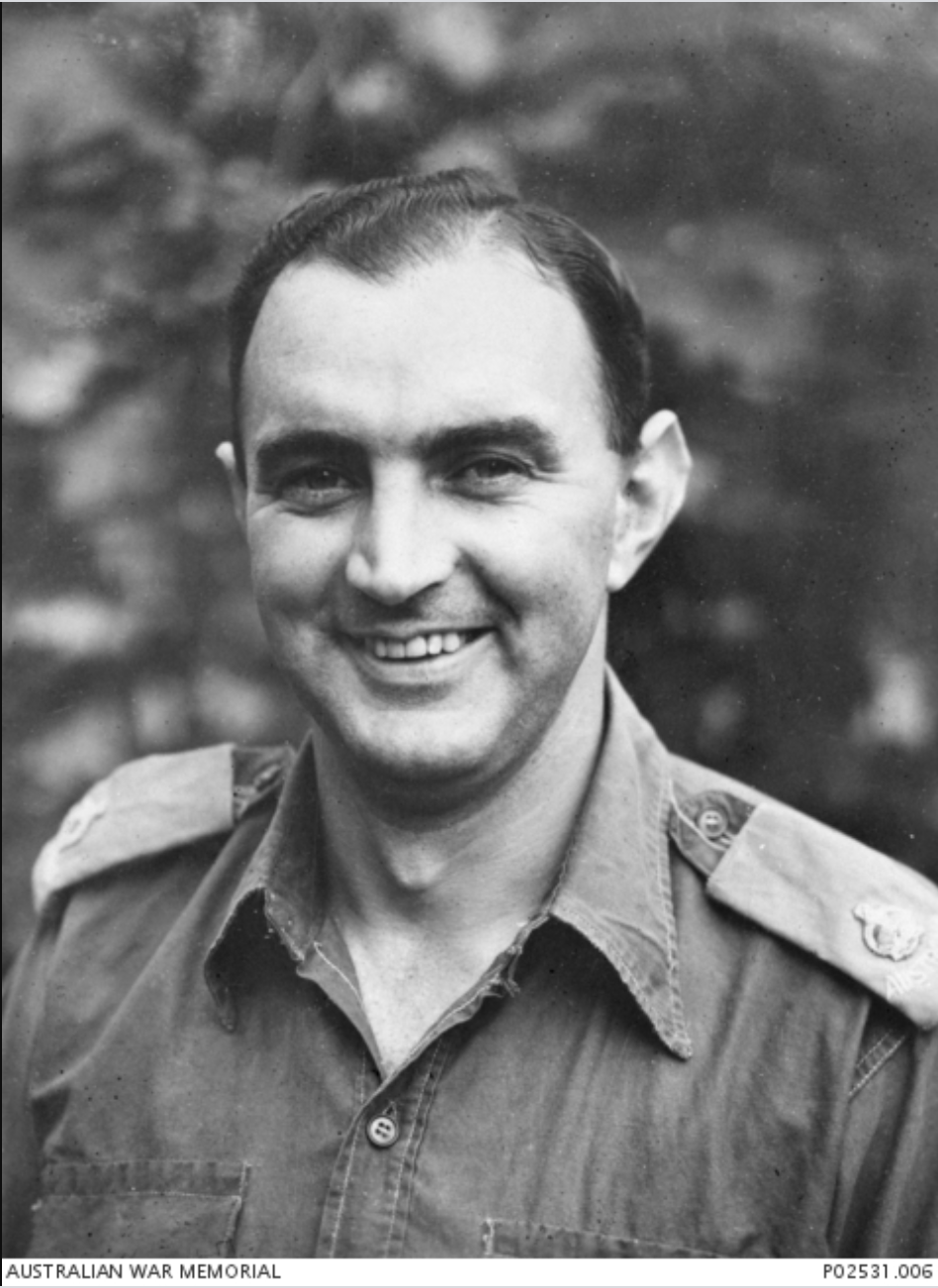
- O'Loan in 1944

Personal information
- Full name: Roderick John Charles O'Loan
- Born: 26 March 1915 Katoomba, New South Wales, Australia
- Died: 19 February 1992 (aged 76) Brisbane, Queensland, Australia

Playing information
- Position: Wing
Club
Years	Team	Pld	T	G	FG	P
1933–34	University	28	12	0	0	36
1935–41	Eastern Suburbs	82	76	0	0	228
	Total	110	88	0	0	264
- Military career
- Allegiance: Australia
- Branch: Australian Army
- Service years: 1942-1945
- Rank: Major
- Unit: 2 Division Australian Army Services Corps
- Conflicts: World War II; Pacific War
- Awards: MBE

Roderick John Charles O'Loan, MBE, CBE (1915–1992) was an Australian rugby league footballer for the Eastern Suburbs club in the New South Wales Rugby Football League premiership. He was also a businessman and a war veteran of distinction.

== Sporting career ==
Rod O'Loan was born in Katoomba, New South Wales, on 26 March 1915 and enjoyed Rugby Union and Rugby League during his younger years. By the time he was the University of Sydney, he excelled at Rugby League and joined the university club as a winger.

O'Loan played for University in 1933 and 1934, scoring twelve tries in twenty-eight games. He then shifted to Easts in 1935 with his university teammate Ross McKinnon and became part of a champion back line which included Dave Brown, Fred Tottey, Jack Beaton, Ernie Norman and Viv Thicknesse, which broke many scoring record in 1935 with 131 tries in just sixteen regular season matches. O'Loan scored 76 tries in 82 games for Eastern Suburbs before retiring at the end of 1941.

O'Loan participated in four premierships during a stellar career at Eastern Suburbs: 1935, 1936, 1937 and 1940, but chose to never play at representative level due to study and corporate commitments.

=== Talented junior sportsman ===
His junior sporting career began at Saint Patrick's College Goulburn, then he moved to the senior school at Waverley College before going onto the University of Sydney. In an article in the Freeman’s Journal of 1931, it was stated that Rod O'Loan was the 1931 junior sprint champion over 100 yards in N.S.W., had won the Botany Junior Sprint title in 1931, was a champion high jumper at 13 years of age and was the holder of many junior swimming records, and he was in the First XI cricket and the First XV Rugby teams at 15 years of age.

After seven seasons in first grade with the Tricolours, Rod O'Loan retired after the 1941 season and enlisted in the Army.

=== Tryscoring record ===
In a match between Eastern Suburbs and his old club University in 1935 O'Loan scored a club record seven tries in a 61–5 win. This tally remains second (behind Frank Burge's eight tries in 1920) on the list of most individual tries in a premiership match. O'Loan scored 27 tries that season, but was beaten by Dave Brown, known as "the Bradman of League", with 38 tries, which is still an NSWRFL/NSWRL/NRL record for one season.

== War service ==
Rod O'Loan enlisted in the Australian Army in 1942. He rose to the rank of major in the 2 Division Australian Army Services Corps.

== Military and civil awards ==
At war's end in 1946, he was awarded the MBE for gallant and distinguished service during the war in the South West Pacific.

He was appointed a CBE in the New Years Honours List of 1977 for Services to the Community. He held senior positions in the business world during his working life, and worked for large companies, including David Jones in Sydney. He was appointed managing director of Finney Isles Stores of Brisbane in 1958 and served as president of the Retailers' Association in 1962.

Rod O'Loan died in Brisbane on 19 February 1992. He married Molly (Mary Patricia, née Croke) in 1940 and had three sons and one daughter.
