= Vince Sheehan (rugby league, born 1916) =

Australian rugby league footballer

Personal information
- Full name: Vincent John Sheehan
- Born: 14 February 1916 Coonabarabran, New South Wales, Australia
- Died: 23 February 1973 (aged 57) Binnaway, New South Wales, Australia

Playing information
- Position: Second-row
Club
Years	Team	Pld	T	G	FG	P
1934–36	Western Suburbs	41	20	0	0	60
Representative
Years	Team	Pld	T	G	FG	P
1936	NSW City	2	5	0	0	15

Vince Sheehan (1916–1973) was an Australian rugby league footballer who played in the 1930s. He played for Western Suburbs in the New South Wales Rugby League (NSWRL) competition.

== Playing career ==
Sheehan attended St Joseph's College Hunters Hill where he played rugby union. He played in the College's premiership winning first XVs in both of his senior final years of 1932 and 1933 alongside Jack Beaton and Clyde Elias.

Sheehan made his first grade debut for Western Suburbs in 1934 aged just eighteen. That season the club went from wooden spooners in 1933 to winning the minor premiership and premiership in 1934.

Sheehan played on the wing in the 1934 grand final victory over Eastern Suburbs at the Sydney Sports Ground with Sheehan scoring a try. As of the 2019 season, no other team since Western Suburbs has come from last place to winning the premiership the following year.

Sheehan played two further seasons for Western Suburbs before retiring at the end of 1936 aged only twenty.

Sheehan played representative football for NSW City in 1936 scoring five tries from two appearances.
