= Jack Craigie =

Australian rugby league footballer

- Born: 1913
- Died: 23 December 1993 (aged 79–80)

Jack "Buster" Craigie (1913–1994) was an Australian rugby league footballer in the New South Wales Rugby League) during the 1930s.

== Biography ==
John James Stuart Cragie, who was nicknamed "Buster" after well known film star of the period, "Buster Craigie", played rugby league for the Eastern Suburbs club in the 1933, '34 and 1936 seasons.

A second rower, Craigie was a member of East's undefeated premiership winning side of 1936.

Following his retirement as a player 'Buster' spent many years as the president of the Eastern Suburbs Rugby League club.

He died on 23 December 1994 at Randwick, New South Wales.
