= 1937 Eastern Suburbs season =

← 1936	1938 →

The 1937 Eastern Suburbs DRLFC season was the 30th in the club's history. They competed in the New South Wales Rugby Football League's 1937 Premiership, finishing the season in first place and winning their third consecutive premiership.

== Ladder ==
	Team	Pld	W	D	L	B	PF	PA	PD	Pts
1	Eastern Suburbs	8	6	2	0	1	187	56	+131	16
2	South Sydney	8	5	1	2	1	264	58	+106	13
3	St. George	8	5	1	2	1	151	92	+59	13
4	Newtown	8	4	0	4	1	144	126	+18	10
5	Canterbury-Bankstown	8	4	0	4	1	98	91	+7	10
6	Balmain	8	4	0	4	1	115	136	-21	10
7	North Sydney	8	3	0	5	1	84	94	-10	8
8	Western Suburbs	8	3	0	5	1	104	126	-22	8
9	University	8	0	0	8	1	44	309	-265	2

Preceded by 1936	Season; 1937	Succeeded by 1938
