= Stan Tancred =

Australian rugby league footballer

Personal information
- Full name: Stanley Tancred
- Born: 4 May 1912 Balmain, New South Wales, Australia
- Died: 6 August 1989 (aged 77) Haberfield, New South Wales, Australia

Playing information
- Position: Centre
Club
| Years | Team | Pld | T | G | FG | P |
|---|---|---|---|---|---|---|
| 1933–37 | Western Suburbs | 47 | 18 | 0 | 0 | 54 |
Representative
| Years | Team | Pld | T | G | FG | P |
| 1933–34 | NSW City | 2 | 3 | 0 | 0 | 9 |

Stanley Tancred (1912–1989) was an Australian rugby league footballer who played in the 1930s.

== Playing career ==
Tancred played five seasons for Western Suburbs between 1933 and 1937, usually as a centre. He won a premiership with them when Wests won the 1934 Grand Final. Tancred also represented New South Wales City Firsts on two occasions in 1933 and 1934.

== Death ==
Tancred died on 6 August 1989, aged 78.
