= Eddie Lockhart =

Australian rugby league footballer

Personal information
- Full name: Edward Lockhart
- Born: 28 June 1915 Orange, New South Wales, Australia
- Died: 28 October 1995 (aged 80) Rozelle, New South Wales, Australia

Playing information
- Position: Five-eighth, Centre, Halfback
Club
| Years | Team | Pld | T | G | FG | P |
|---|---|---|---|---|---|---|
| 1936–37 | Balmain | 7 | 0 | 0 | 0 | 0 |
- Source: As of 18 June 2019

Edward Lockhart (1915–1995) was an Australian rugby league footballer who played in the 1930s.

== Playing career ==
A local Balmain junior from Rozelle, Lockhart played two first grade seasons in the NSWRFL during 1936–1937.

He played at centre in the 1936 Grand Final for Balmain against Eastern Suburbs which Easts won 32–12 at the Sydney Cricket Ground. The grand final was also Lockhart's first grade debut.

== Death ==
Lockhart died at Rozelle, New South Wales on 28 October 1995.
