= Albert Horsell =

Australian rugby league footballer (1909–1982)

Personal information
- Full name: Albert Reginald Horsell
- Born: 10 Apr 1909
- Died: 14 Sep 1982 Maroubra, New South Wales

Playing information
- Position: Fullback
Club
Years	Team	Pld	T	G	FG	P
1936	Eastern Suburbs	2	0	0	0	0
1938	Eastern Suburbs	9	0	5	0	10
	Total	11	0	5	0	10
- Source: Whiticker/Hudson As of 2020

Albert Horsell (1909–1982) was a rugby league footballer in the Australian competition, the New South Wales Rugby League.

Horsell was a member of the Eastern Suburbs club in the 1936 and 1938 seasons. In 1936, Eastern Suburbs won their 6th premiership.
