= Jack Lynch (rugby league) =

Australian rugby league footballer

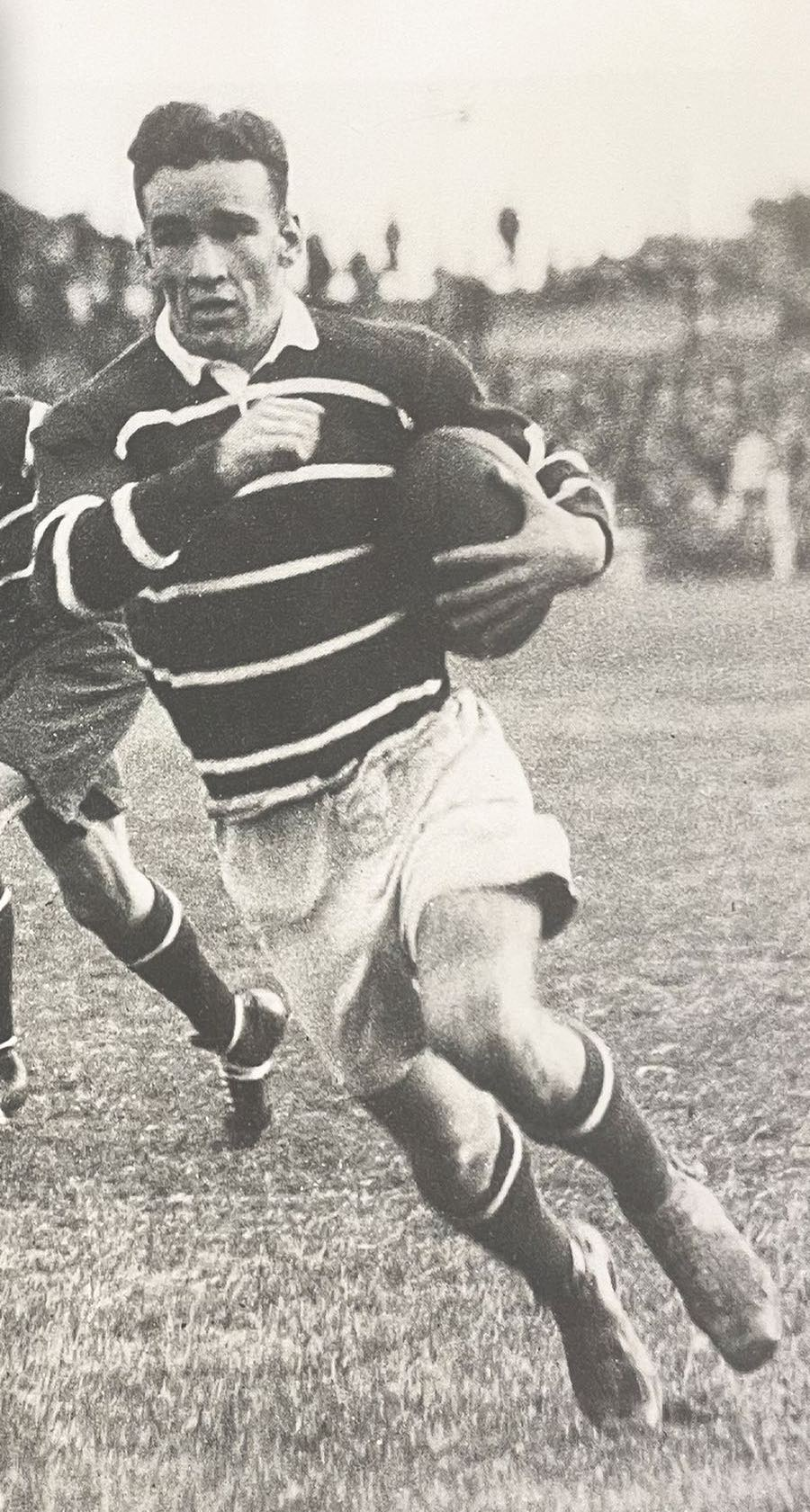

Personal information
- Full name: John Edward Joseph Lynch
- Born: 5 July 1910; Sydney, New South Wales, Australia
- Died: 8 August 1966 (aged 56); Bondi Junction, New South Wales, Australia

Playing information
- Position: Centre
Club
Years	Team	Pld	T	G	FG	P
1930–36	Eastern Suburbs	57	39	112	1	343

John Edward Joseph Lynch (5 July 1910 – 8 August 1966) was an Australian rugby league footballer who played for Eastern Suburbs in the New South Wales Rugby Football League competition in the 1930s.

Lynch attended Sydney's Waverley College, before being graded by the Eastern Suburbs club. He made his first grade debut in 1930, the same year as 1930s league star Dave Brown, who had also attended Waverley College.

== Club career ==
Lynch played exclusively first grade for Eastern Sububs between 1930 and 1934. He scored four tries and kicked four goals against Balmain in round 13 of the 1931 season. He was a member of the Eastern Suburbs side that was defeated by South Sydney in the 1931 premiership decider. Lynch was the competition's leading try-scorer and point-scorer for the 1931 season with 16 tries and 124 points.

Lynch scored 181 points for Easts in the 1935 reserve grade season, then a reserve grade record. He played in the centres replacing the injured Jack Beaton in the 1936 premiership-deciding match against Balmain, scoring a try.

Lynch retired at the end of the 1937 season. During his career, Lynch played 57 first grade matches scoring a total of 343 points (39 tries, 112 goals, and 1 field goal).

== Administrative career ==
Following his retirement from the game as a player he became a graded referee, was a lower grade coach at the Eastern Suburbs club and served as club secretary during the 1950s.

In 1963 he was a manager for that year's Kangaroo tour and a deputy vice-president of the New South Wales Rugby Football League.

Jack Lynch died after a suffering a heart attack in 1966.
