= Bill Halloway =

Australian rugby league footballer (born 1912)

Personal information
- Full name: William Joseph Halloway
- Born: 1912

Playing information
- Position: Centre, Halfback
Club
Years	Team	Pld	T	G	FG	P
1935	Eastern Suburbs	1	0	0	0	0
1936	South Sydney	5	0	0	0	0
	Total	6	0	0	0	0
- As of 15 Jul 2021

William Joseph Halloway (born 1912) was a rugby league footballer in the New South Wales Rugby League (NSWRL) competition. Halloway played for the Eastern Suburbs in 1935, the season that the club won their fifth premiership. Halloway played for the South Sydney Rabbitohs the following season.
