= Frank Johnston (rugby league) =

Australian rugby league footballer

Personal information
- Full name: Frank Johnston
- Born: 12 August 1914; Balmain, New South Wales, Australia
- Died: 25 July 1981 (aged 66)

Playing information
- Position: Fullback
Club
Years	Team	Pld	T	G	FG	P
1936–40	Balmain	42	4	0	0	42
Representative
Years	Team	Pld	T	G	FG	P
1938	New South Wales	1	0	0	0	0
1938	NSW City	2	0	2	0	4
- Source: As of 21 February 2019

Frank Johnston was an Australian rugby league footballer who played in the 1930s and 1940s. He played for Balmain in the NSWRL Competition.

== Playing career ==
Johnston made his first grade debut in Round 5 1936 against Newtown with Balmain winning 11-6 and Johnston scoring a try on debut.

Johnston played at fullback in the 1936 NSWRL grand final against a star studded Eastern Suburbs team featuring future immortal David Brown. Balmain lost the match 32–12 with Johnston kicking a consolation penalty goal.

In 1938, Balmain finished 3rd on the table but lost against eventual premiers Canterbury-Bankstown in the semi-final 31–24 with Johnston playing a fullback. Johnston was also selected to represent New South Wales and New South Wales City in 1938.

Johnston missed out on playing in Balmain's 1939 premiership winning team but returned to the field in 1940 before retiring.
