= Syd Christensen =

Australian rugby league footballer

Personal information
- Full name: Sydney Henry Albert Christensen
- Born: 31 May 1910 Sydney, Australia
- Died: 9 February 1942 (aged 31) Malaya

Playing information
- Position: Five-eighth
Club
| Years | Team | Pld | T | G | FG | P |
|---|---|---|---|---|---|---|
| 1928–29 | Glebe | 5 | 4 | 8 | 0 | 28 |
| 1930–37 | Balmain | 63 | 42 | 185 | 0 | 496 |
| | Total | 68 | 46 | 193 | 0 | 524 |
Representative
| Years | Team | Pld | T | G | FG | P |
| 1930 | Queensland | 1 | 0 | 0 | 0 | 0 |
| 1934 | NSW City | 1 | 0 | 0 | 0 | 0 |

Sydney Henry Albert Christensen (31 May 1910 – 9 February 1942) was an Australian rugby league player who played in the 1920s and 1930s and a casualty of World War II.

== Background ==
Christensen was born at Sydney on 31 May 1910 and was of Danish descent.

== Playing career ==
Syd 'Sardie' Christensen was a first grade player for Glebe for two seasons between 1928 and 1929. He transferred to the Balmain Tigers when the Glebe club disbanded in 1929 and went on to become a prolific point scorer for the Tigers. He played six seasons with Balmain between 1930, 1933–1937. In 1936 he became club captain, and became the first Balmain player to reach 100 points in a season, a record that he achieved three years in a row.

He was the NSWRFL top point scorer in 1933 and 1936. He was captain of the Balmain team that were defeated by Eastern Suburbs in the 1936 Grand Final. He was known as an excellent tactician and goal kicker during his rugby league career.

== War service ==
Syd Christensen enlisted in the Australian Army in 1940. He was killed in action on 9 February 1942 in British Malaya, although his death was not confirmed until October 1944.
