= Johnny Parker (rugby league) =

Australian rugby league footballer

Personal information
- Full name: Johnny Parker

Playing information
- Position: Centre, Fullback
Club
Years	Team	Pld	T	G	FG	P
1936	Eastern Suburbs	1	1	0	0	3
1940	South Sydney	1	0	0	0	0
1942	Eastern Suburbs	10	1	1	0	5
	Total	12	2	1	0	8

Johnny Parker was a rugby league footballer in the Australian competition, the New South Wales Rugby League.

== Playing career ==
Parker played eleven matches for Eastern Suburbs club in the years 1936 & '41. although not playing in the final series for the Tricolours that year, Parker was a member of the East's side that went unbeaten in winning the 1936 premiership.

Parker also had one season playing for South Sydney in 1940, he played just the one match.

== Sources ==
- The Encyclopedia Of Rugby League; Alan Whiticker & Glen Hudson
