= Gus Reeves =

Australian rugby league footballer

Personal information
- Full name: Augustus Charles Reeves
- Born: 29 October 1911 Glebe, New South Wales, Australia
- Died: 11 June 1996 (aged 84) Sydney, New South Wales, Australia

Playing information
- Position: Wing
Club
Years	Team	Pld	T	G	FG	P
1935–36	Balmain	13	8	0	0	24
- Source: The Encyclopedia Of Rugby League Players (1995) Glen Hudson/Alan Whiticker

Augustus Charles Reeves (1911–1996) was an Australian rugby league footballer who played as a winger in the 1930s.

== Background ==
Reeves was born in Glebe, New South Wales, Australia on 29 October 1911.

== Playing career ==
A flying winger that had great speed, Reeves was a regular in first grade for Balmain in the late 1930s, scoring 8 tries in 13 first grade appearances between 1935 and 1936. Reeves played for Balmain in the 1936 Grand Final

== Post playing ==
Reeves later became a physical instructor in the Australian Army in 1941.

== Death ==
Reeves died on 11 June 1996, age 84.
