= Wal Bamford =

Australian rugby league footballer

Personal information
- Born: 17 February 1916
- Died: 2 March 1985 (aged 69)

Playing information
- Position: Second-row, Lock
Club
Years	Team	Pld	T	G	FG	P
1936–41	Eastern Suburbs	6	1	0	0	3

Wal Bamford (1916–1985) was a professional rugby league footballer in the Australian competition, the New South Wales Rugby League.

Walter Hamilton Bamford played for the Eastern Suburbs club in the years 1936 and 1939–1941, although not playing in the final series for the Tricolours he was a member of the premiership winning sides in 1936 and 1940.

== Career statistics ==
seasons	matches	tries	goals	FG	points
1936 and 1939–41	6	1	-	-	3
