= Edmund Beaver =

Australian rugby league footballer

Personal information
- Full name: Edmund Francis Beaver
- Born: 8 July 1911 Sydney, New South Wales, Australia
- Died: 21 July 1993 (aged 82) Petersham, New South Wales, Australia

Playing information
- Position: Second-row, Prop
Club
Years	Team	Pld	T	G	FG	P
1932–37	Balmain	60	4	0	0	12
- Source: As of 10 May 2019

Edmund Beaver (1911 - 1993) was an Australian rugby league footballer who played in the 1930s. He played for Balmain in the New South Wales Rugby League (NSWRL) competition.

== Playing career ==
Beaver made his first grade debut for Balmain in Round 6 1932 against University at Birchgrove Oval scoring a try in a 26–10 victory. Beaver would go on to become a regular starter for the club playing at either second-row or prop.

In 1936, Balmain finished second on the table and reached the 1936 NSWRL grand final by beating North Sydney in the preliminary final. In the grand final, Beaver played at second-row as Balmain went into the half time break down 8–6 against Eastern Suburbs. In the second half, Eastern Suburbs scored 24 points to win the match in convincing fashion 32–12 at the Sydney Cricket Ground in front of a low crowd of 14,395. The following season, Balmain finished in 4th place on the table in which proved to be Beaver's last season. His final game for Balmain was a 15–5 loss against South Sydney in Round 9 1937.
