= Henry McCallum (rugby league) =

Australian rugby league footballer

Henry McCallum (born 28 January 1915) was a professional rugby league footballer in the Australian competition, the New South Wales Rugby League.

McCallum's only matches were for the Eastern Suburbs club in the 1936 season.
