= Dave Manning (rugby league) =

Australian rugby league footballer

Personal information
- Full name: David Edmond Manning
- Born: 21 April 1910; Temora, New South Wales, Australia
- Died: 18 September 1979 (aged 69); Temora, New South Wales, Australia

Playing information
- Position: Prop, Second-row
Club
Years	Team	Pld	T	G	FG	P
1936–39	Balmain	52	1	0	0	3

Dave Manning (1910−1979) was an Australian professional rugby league footballer who played in the 1930s. He played for Balmain as a prop and sometimes as a second rower.

== Playing career ==
Manning made his debut for Balmain in Round 1 of the 1936 season in a 33–6 victory over St George at the Sydney Sports Ground. Manning's only try for the club came in a 17–7 defeat against Western Suburbs. In the same season, Manning played for Balmain in the 1936 grand final defeat against Eastern Suburbs.

In 1939, Manning was a member of the Balmain side which won their 7th premiership defeating South Sydney in the grand final 33–4 at the Sydney Cricket Ground. This match would be the players last for the club and Manning retired at the end of the season.
