= Tom Grahame =

Australian rugby league footballer

Personal information
- Full name: Tommy Grahame

Playing information
- Position: Halfback, Five-eighth
Club
Years	Team	Pld	T	G	FG	P
1934–36	Balmain	29	9	0	0	27
1937–46	Huddersfield
1946–47	Castleford	24	4	0	0	12
	Total	53	13	0	0	39
Representative
Years	Team	Pld	T	G	FG	P
1933–37	NSW Country	4	1	0	0	3
- Source: As of 22 February 2019

Tom Grahame was an Australian rugby league footballer who played in the 1930s. He played for Balmain in the NSWRL Competition and Castleford.

== Playing career ==
Grahame made his first grade debut for Balmain against Western Suburbs in Round 1 1934 at the Leichhardt Oval.

Grahame missed the entire 1935 season but returned to the side in 1936. Grahame played at halfback in the 1936 NSWRL grand final against Eastern Suburbs. Balmain went into the game as the underdogs and were soundly beaten by Easts 32–12.

This would be the last game that Grahame would play for the club. At representative level, Grahame played 4 times for NSW Country between 1933 and 1937.

In 1937, Grahame sailed to England to play rugby league for Huddersfield. In 1946, he was signed by Castleford.
