= Jack Coote =

Australian rugby league footballer and coach

Personal information
- Full name: John Joseph Coote
- Born: 20 November 1907; Australia
- Died: 24 November 1986 (aged 79); Australia

Playing information
- Position: Prop, Lock
Club
Years	Team	Pld	T	G	FG	P
1927–37	Eastern Suburbs	41	14	0	0	42
- Relatives: Ron Coote (son)

John Joseph Coote (1907–1986) was a rugby league footballer who played in the Australian competition, the New South Wales Rugby League (NSWRL). A junior of the Eastern Suburbs club, Coote was the father of Australian Rugby League Immortal Ron Coote.

== Playing career ==
A forward, Coote played in some of the great Easts' sides of the mid-thirties, highlighted by an appearance in the 1936 premiership decider. Coote also won two further premierships with Eastern Suburbs in 1935 and 1937.

Coote played five first grade seasons with Eastern Suburbs: 1929, 1930, 1935, 1936 and 1937. During the early 1930s, Coote was captain-coach of Condobolin, New South Wales and won premiership shield with them in 1931. He retired at the end of the 1937 NSWRFL season.

== Death ==
Coote died in 1986.

== Sources ==
- The Encyclopedia of Rugby League; Alan Whiticker and Glen Hudson
