= Max Nixon =

Australian rugby league footballer

Tom McLachlan
Personal information
- Full name: William Maxwell Nixon
- Born: 17 April 1911 Sydney, New South Wales, Australia
- Died: 7 June 1992 (aged 81) Sydney, New South Wales, Australia

Playing information
- Position: Second-row, Prop
Club
Years	Team	Pld	T	G	FG	P
1931–38	Eastern Suburbs	103	20	0	0	60
- Source: As of 7 June 2019

William Maxwell Nixon (1911–1992) was an Australian rugby league player who played in the 1930s.

== Playing career ==
Originally a rugby union player, Nixon changed to league and was graded in 1930. He played for the Eastern Suburbs Roosters for seven seasons between 1931–1938.

Nixon won a premiership with Easts in 1935, when his side defeated South Sydney Rabbitohs 19–3 in the final. He also played for the Easts team that was defeated by Western Suburbs in 1934.

Nixon died on 7 June 1992, aged 81.
