= Tom Dowling (rugby league) =

Australian rugby league footballer

Personal information
- Full name: Thomas Dowling
- Born: 1907
- Died: 1969

Playing information
- Position: Fullback
Club
| Years | Team | Pld | T | G | FG | P |
|---|---|---|---|---|---|---|
| 1933–37 | Eastern Suburbs | 67 | 1 | 60 | 0 | 123 |
- Source: As of 7 June 2019

Tom Dowling (1907–1969) was an Australian professional rugby league footballer who played in the 1930s. He played in the New South Wales Rugby Football League premiership for the Eastern Suburbs club.

== Playing career ==
Dowling was a fullback in the champion Eastern Suburbs sides of the 1930s.

Dowling played 67 matches for the club in the years (1933–37).

Dowling won premierships with the club in 1935, 1936 and 1937 as well as being a runner up in the 1934 premiership decider. The fullback is recognised as the 224th player to wear the red, white and blue of Eastern Suburbs. Dowling was a very fine goal-kicker, scoring 1 try and 60 goals during his five seasons at Easts.
