= Tom McLachlan =

Australian rugby league footballer

Personal information
- Full name: Thomas Alroe McLachlan
- Born: 16 December 1906 Sydney, New South Wales, Australia
- Died: 27 April 1986 (aged 79) Sydney, New South Wales, Australia

Playing information
- Position: Hooker
Club
Years	Team	Pld	T	G	FG	P
1931	South Sydney	8	0	0	0	0
1934–37	Eastern Suburbs	51	4	1	0	14
	Total	59	4	1	0	14
- Source: As of 7 June 2019

Thomas Alroe McLachlan (1906–1986) was an Australian rugby league footballer who played in the New South Wales Rugby League (NSWRL).

== Playing career ==
A South Sydney junior, McLachlan made his 1st grade debut for that club in 1931.

In 1934, McLachlan joined the Eastern Suburbs club where he remained until his retirement at the end of the 1937 Season. A hooker, McLachlan played in some of East's greatest sides, winning premierships with the club in 1935, 1936 and 1937. He was also a member of the Eastern Suburbs side that was defeated by Western Suburbs in the 1934 premiership decider.

== Post playing ==
McLachlan went on to become president of the Australian Postal Workers’ Union.

== Sources ==
- The Encyclopedia Of Rugby League; Alan Whiticker & Glen Hudson
- From Where The Sun Rises; Ian Heads, Geoff Armstrong & David Middleton
