= Fred Tottey =

Australian rugby league footballer

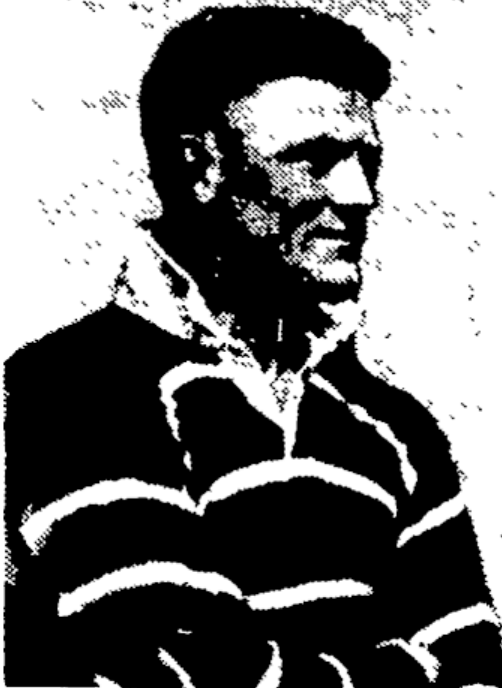

Personal information
- Full name: Frederick Tottey
- Born: 25 November 1909 Brisbane, Queensland, Australia
- Died: 28 September 1977 (aged 67) New Zealand

Playing information
- Position: Wing
Club
Years	Team	Pld	T	G	FG	P
1930–37	Eastern Suburbs	74	77	0	0	231
1940	Mount Albert United	2	0	0	0	0
	Total	76	77	0	0	231
Representative
Years	Team	Pld	T	G	FG	P
1937	New South Wales	4	5	0	0	15
1931–37	NSW City	3	3	0	0	9
- Source: As of 7 June 2019

Frederick Joseph Tottey (25 November 1909 – 1977) was a rugby league footballer who played in Australia's leading competition the New South Wales Rugby Football League.

== Career ==
Tottey, a winger, played 74 matches for Eastern Suburbs between 1930 and 1937 before joining the English club Halifax for the 1938 season.

Tottey played his junior football in New Zealand. He joined Easts as a 17-year-old. A member of the great Eastern Suburbs sides of the 1930s, Tottey won three consecutive premierships with the club in 1935, 1936 and 1937. In those three seasons the Tricolours lost just one match.

=== Playing record ===
In the 1935 season Tottey scored 19 tries, combining with fellow threequarters Dave Brown and Rod O'Loan for an amazing aggregate of 84 tries in just eighteen games. Tottey holds one of rugby league's most amazing records – scoring tries in 15 consecutive matches. The winger scored 77 tries in total during his time at Eastern Suburbs.

Tottey was a representative of both Sydney and New South Wales and was selected for the 1937/38 Kangaroo Tour but was ruled out after suffering a broken ankle while representing New South Wales. Tottey sailed with the actual Kangaroo tourists to England where he joined his new club – Halifax RFC. He returned to Sydney and in April 1939 he travelled to Auckland with a touring team from Sydney to play 3 club matches. He played in matches with Mount Albert United and Manukau. In May he attempted to again play with Easts but Halifax refused to offer him a release as he was contracted to them until 1940. The contractual dispute was never resolved and he didn't play Rugby League or Union again in Australia. In 1940 the Mount Albert club in Auckland made several attempts to get permission for him to play for them but were unsuccessful, he did however play in their 2 preseason matches which ostensibly fell outside official rules. Tottey then switched back to the rugby union code and turned out for the Grammar side before returning to Australia mid season due to tightening travel restrictions due to the war.

Tottey died in New Zealand in 1977.
