= Ray Stehr =

Australian RL coach and former Australia international rugby league footballer

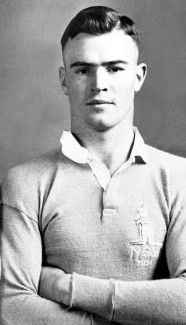

Personal information
- Full name: Raymond Ernest Stehr
- Born: 24 January 1913 Warialda, New South Wales, Australia
- Died: 2 June 1983 (aged 70) Maroubra, New South Wales

Playing information
- Height: 181 cm (5 ft 11 in)
- Weight: 84 kg (13 st 3 lb)
- Position: Prop
Club
Years	Team	Pld	T	G	FG	P
1929–46	Eastern Suburbs	182	19	4	0	65
Representative
Years	Team	Pld	T	G	FG	P
1931–41	New South Wales	41	4	2	0	16
1933–38	Australia	11	2	0	0	6
1933–41	NSW City	7	3	2	0	9
1934	NSW Country	1	1	0	0	3

Coaching information
Club
Years	Team	Gms	W	D	L	W%
1939, 41, 46 & 49	Eastern Suburbs	62	29	1	32	47
1947–48	Manly-Warringah	36	8	1	27	22
	Total	98	37	2	59	38
- Source: As of 27 October 2009

Raymond Ernest Stehr (24 January 1913 – 2 June 1983) was an Australian rugby league footballer, a state and national representative player whose club career was played at Sydney's Eastern Suburbs club. He has been named as one of the nation's finest footballers of the 20th century.

== Early life ==
Stehr was born in the country New South Wales town of Warialda in 1913 of German descent. As an eight-year-old child, he was diagnosed an incurable cripple after developing blood clots at the base of his spine. He was unable to walk for two years and spent twelve months strapped to a stretcher, completely immobilised with his back encased in a plaster cast. His family moved to Sydney in search of some kind of miracle cure and, following a visit to a Chinese herbalist, the clots began to disappear. Nevertheless, Stehr was told not to contemplate playing contact sport. Stehr defied medical opinion, becoming one of rugby league's toughest front rowers.

== Club career ==
First recruited as a schoolboy from Randwick Boys High School by the Eastern Suburbs club in 1928, Stehr made his first-grade debut in a trial match against Newcastle ahead of the 1928 season when he was aged just 15. The following season aged just 16 years and 85 days he made his regular competition debut – still the youngest ever first-grade Australian player.

In 1934 Stehr joined the Mudgee club in rural NSW as a captain-coach and also captained Country in their annual clash against a Sydney representative side. Midway through the 1934 season he rejoined Easts who were defeated by Western Suburbs in the premiership decider that year. Over the next three seasons, Stehr was a member of the Eastern Suburbs side that lost just one match, winning premierships in each of those years – 1935, 1936 and 1937.

In 1940 Stehr was captain of the Easts side that captured its 8th premiership. Regular captain-coach Dave Brown pulled out on match day with a leg injury and Stehr led the side to a victory in the final over Canterbury-Bankstown. Following WWII in 1945, he led Eastern Suburbs to further premiership glory.

All told he played in 184 matches for Eastern Suburbs a then record.

== Representative career ==
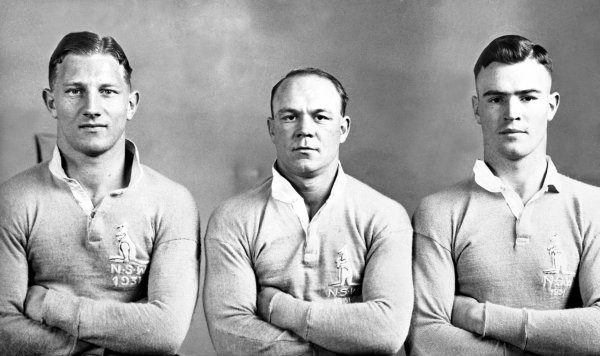
1931 NSW reps Brown, Norman and Stehr

He made his debut for New South Wales in 1931 and two years later was selected for the 1933–34 Kangaroo tour of Great Britain. On tour he played in 26 matches, including two Tests.

Stehr played in Test series against New Zealand and Great Britain. In the series against Britain he set an inglorious record when he was sent off in two of the three matches. The uncompromising, no-nonsense front rower was selected for his second Kangaroo tour in 1937–38.

All told he represented Australia on 55 occasions and in 11 Tests. He played 33 matches for New South Wales, a tally which stands today at third place in the most games by a player for the state (behind Clive Churchill and Graeme Langlands).

== War service ==
WWII brought a premature end to his test career and Stehr spent war in the services. Stationed in Darwin, Stehr was named captain of a North Australian representative side in a match against Central Australia.

== Post-playing ==
During his career, the uncompromising front row forward had a short stint as a professional Boxer.

After playing retirement in 1946, he remained involved with the game. He was coach at Manly in 1947-48 and Easts in 1949. A sports journalist – Stehr wrote a column, for many years, in a Sydney newspaper and worked in television media. He was also club president at Easts. In 1961 he was the commentator for the first Australian rugby league match ever broadcast live. His typical sign-off call in the media was always "Easts To Win!".

Ray Stehr died on 2 June 1983 aged 70.

== Accolades ==
Stehr was named in Eastern Suburbs greatest ever team – an honorary team.

In February 2008, Stehr was named in the list of Australia's 100 Greatest Players (1908–2007) which was commissioned by the NRL and ARL to celebrate the code's centenary year in Australia.
