= Viv Thicknesse =

Australia international rugby league player

Personal information
- Born: Vivian Arthur Thicknesse; 18 November 1910 Temora, New South Wales, Australia
- Died: 19 August 1986 (aged 75) Orange, New South Wales

Playing information

Rugby union
- Position: Half-back
Club
Years	Team	Pld	T	G	FG	P
1930–32	Eastern Suburbs RUFC
Representative
Years	Team	Pld	T	G	FG	P
1930	New South Wales

Rugby league
- Position: Halfback
Club
Years	Team	Pld	T	G	FG	P
1933–37	Eastern Suburbs	75	19	0	0	57
Representative
Years	Team	Pld	T	G	FG	P
1933–36	NSW	11	3	0	0	9
1933–35	Australia	7	0	0	0	0

Viv Thicknesse (1910–1986) was an Australian dual-code rugby half-back, a state representative in both rugby league and rugby union. His rugby league career was spent with the champion Eastern Suburbs sides of the 1930s and he represented Australia in that code in seven Tests.

== Playing career ==
Following his schooling at Sydney Boys High School in the 1920s, Thicknesse was a half-back with Sydney's Eastern Suburbs Rugby Union Club. He switched to the professional code in 1931 and joined Eastern Suburbs' rugby league side. He was a member of the Tricolours' champion teams of the 1930s and won consecutive premierships with the club in the NSWRL seasons of 1935, 1936 and 1937. He captained the 1937 side.

He represented New South Wales on eleven occasions between 1933 and 1936 and made his international debut for Australia on the 1933–34 Kangaroo tour of Great Britain where he appeared in two Tests and in sixteen minor matches. He played in further Test series against New Zealand in 1935 and against Great Britain in 1936 for a total of seven career Test appearances. He is listed on the Australian Players Register as Kangaroo No. 181. He formed a formidable representative halves pairing with Wests great Vic Hey and with his Easts clubmate Ernie Norman.

== Accolades ==
A halfback, Thicknesse was renowned for his passing game and was selected in Eastern Suburbs 'Team of the Century'. Dally Messenger once said of Viv Thicknesse that "he rated him the equal of any half he had seen play the game".

Thicknesse was also a very talented water polo player for the Sydney Water Polo club, and was even selected in the NSW Water Polo Team that defeated Victoria in the 1931 Regal Cup Series, held in Sydney. SMH, 9th March 1931, p.14

In February 2008, Thicknesse was named in the list of Australia's 100 Greatest Players (1908–2007) which was commissioned by the NRL and ARL to celebrate the code's centenary year in Australia.

== Legacy ==
Viv Thicknesse maintained scrapbooks throughout his playing career, and a diary of the 1933–34 Kangaroo tour of Great Britain. In 2012, the State Library of New South Wales acquired Viv Thicknesse's scrapbooks and diaries.

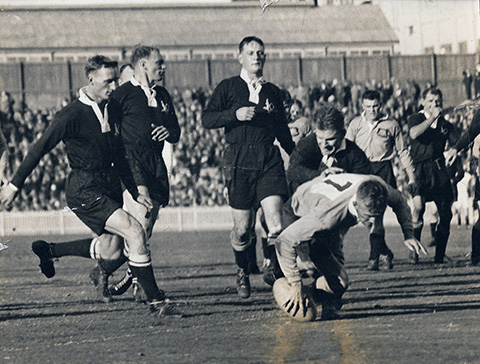
Thicknesse scores in 1933 for NSW v Qld

== Sources ==
- Andrews, Malcolm (2006) The ABC of Rugby League Austn Broadcasting Corpn, Sydney
- Whiticker, Alan & Hudson, Glen (2006) The Encyclopedia of Rugby League Players, Gavin Allen Publishing, Sydney
