= Ernie Norman =

Australian RL coach and former Australia international rugby league footballer

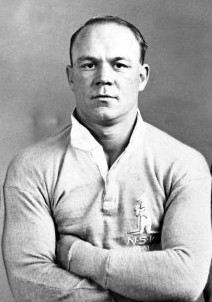
- Norman in 1931

Personal information
- Full name: Ernest James Norman
- Born: 12 October 1912 Paddington, New South Wales, Australia
- Died: 3 August 1993 (aged 80) Paddington, New South Wales, Australia

Playing information
- Position: Centre, Five-eighth
Club
Years	Team	Pld	T	G	FG	P
1931–39	Eastern Suburbs	101	26	0	0	78
Representative
Years	Team	Pld	T	G	FG	P
1931–37	New South Wales	15	3	0	0	9
1932–38	Australia	12	1	0	0	3
1931–37	NSW City	5	2	0	0	6

Coaching information
Club
Years	Team	Gms	W	D	L	W%
1950–52	Eastern Suburbs	54	22	0	32	41

Ernest James Norman (12 October 1912 – 3 August 1993) was an Australian rugby league player – a state and national representative centre or five-eighth. His club career was with the Eastern Suburbs club in the New South Wales Rugby Football League competition. Norman played with Easts for nine seasons between 1931 and 1939. He played over 100 matches for that club and was a member of the Easts sides that won consecutive premierships in seasons 1935, 1936 and 1937.

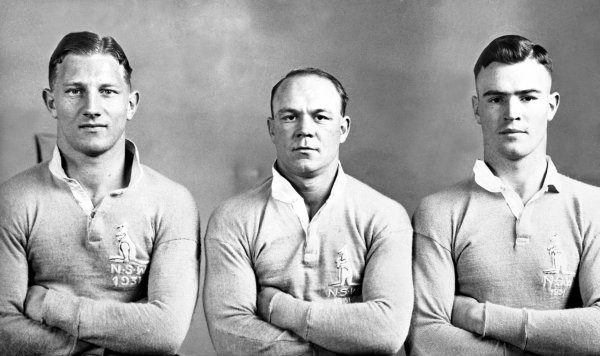
1931 NSW reps Brown, Norman and Stehr

== Playing career ==
Norman was born in Paddington, New South Wales in 1912 and was an Eastern Suburbs junior. He was graded with Easts at seventeen years of age and made his Australian debut two years later at nineteen. Throughout his career he made fifteen state representative appearances for New South Wales and played in twelve Tests for the Australia national rugby league team. He is listed on the Australian Players Register as Kangaroo No. 169.

Norman coached Eastern Suburbs for three seasons from 1950 to 1952. By this time Easts had fallen into the cellar – they had been bottom for the first time in the 1949 season under Ray Stehr – and although Norman improved the Tricolours to seventh in 1950 with seven wins and fifth with nine victories (including premiers South Sydney's solitary home-and-away defeat) in 1951, a lapse to eighth in 1952 prevented him keeping the job.

Norman died of a short illness on 3 August 1993, 70 days before his 81st birthday.

In February 2008, Norman was named in the list of Australia's 100 Greatest Players (1908–2007) which was commissioned by the NRL and ARL to celebrate the code's centenary year in Australia.
