= Jack Beaton =

Australia international rugby league footballer

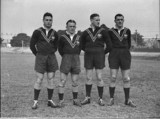

Personal information
- Full name: John James Beaton
- Born: 2 January 1914 Grafton, New South Wales, Australia
- Died: 5 June 1996 (aged 82) Five Dock, New South Wales, Australia

Playing information
- Position: Five-eighth
Club
Years	Team	Pld	T	G	FG	P
1934–38	Eastern Suburbs	38	18	62	0	178
Representative
Years	Team	Pld	T	G	FG	P
1934–37	New South Wales	19	23	17	0	103
1936–38	Australia	10	1	14	0	31

John Beaton (2 January 1914 – 5 June 1996) was an Australian rugby league player, a national representative of the 1930s whose short but brilliant club career was played with Sydney's Eastern Suburbs club. He has been named amongst the nation's finest footballers of the 20th century.

== Early life and club career ==
Originally from Grafton, New South Wales, Beaton moved to Sydney where he attended St. Joseph's College, Hunters Hill, enjoying schoolboy success at rugby union, track & field, and cricket. Beaton took up a role as captain with a country rugby league side in Lismore, New South Wales, before moving back to Sydney the following season to join up with the Eastern Suburbs club.

Beaton, who was better known as a fullback or centre, was an extremely versatile player who could play anywhere in the backline. From his debut with club in 1934 till his retirement at the end of the 1937 season Easts lost just 4 matches. He played in some of the Tricolours greatest teams during his brief career, winning 3 premierships with the club and was runner-up in his only other year. Beaton retired at just 24 years of age to take up a business opportunity.

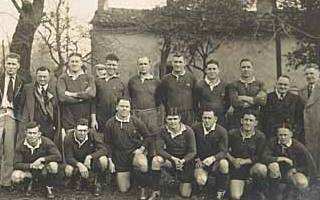
Beaton (back row 4th from right) with 1937-38 Kangaroos

== Representative and honours ==
He was first selected for New South Wales in 1934 and made 13 appearances up til his retirement in 1937. Beaton played in ten Test matches for Australia debuting against England in 1936. He was selected for the 1937 Kangaroo tour, played in all five Tests plus 22 minor matches and returned as the tour's top point-scorer with 124 points (6 tries and 53 goals). Jack Beaton is listed on the Australian Players Register as Kangaroo No. 203.

In February 2008, Beaton was named in the list of Australia's 100 Greatest Players (1908–2007), which was commissioned by the NRL and ARL to celebrate the code's centenary year in Australia. He had previously been named as a reserve in Eastern Suburbs 'Team of the Century'.

== Sources ==
- Middleton, David Rugby League Yearbook
- Whiticker, Alan & Hudson, Glen (2006) The Encyclopedia of Rugby League Players, Gavin Allen Publishing, Sydney
- Middleton, David and Heads, Ian (2008) A Centenary of Rugby League, MacMillan
