= Dave Brown (rugby league, born 1913) =

Australian RL coach and former Australia international rugby league footballer

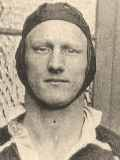

Personal information
- Full name: David Michael Brown
- Born: 4 April 1913 Sydney, New South Wales, Australia
- Died: 23 February 1974 (aged 60) Earlwood, New South Wales,[Australia

Playing information
- Position: Centre
Club
Years	Team	Pld	T	G	FG	P
1930–36	Eastern Suburbs	78	90	160	0	594
1937–39	Warrington	93	48	91	0	326
1939–41	Eastern Suburbs	16	3	32	0	73
	Total	187	141	283	0	993
Representative
Years	Team	Pld	T	G	FG	P
1930–36	New South Wales	28	19	62	0	181
1933–36	Australia	12	11	48	0	129
1937	Dominion XIII	1	0	0	0	0
1932–36	NSW City	4	1	6	0	15

Coaching information
Club
Years	Team	Gms	W	D	L	W%
1940	Eastern Suburbs	16	11	1	4	69
1943	Eastern Suburbs	14	4	0	10	29
1957–59	Eastern Suburbs	54	23	0	31	43
	Total	84	38	1	45	45

David Michael Brown (4 April 1913 – 23 February 1974) was one of Australia's greatest rugby league footballers.

Brown in his distinctive headgear was said to be one of the most admired sights in the game during the 1930s. He won two premierships with Easts and scored so many points, tries and goals and established so many records (some may never be bettered) that he is referred to as "the Bradman of league". In 2003 Brown was inducted into the Australian Rugby League Hall of Fame and in 2008 he was named in the New South Wales rugby league team of the century. In 2018, Brown joined Rugby League's elite by being inducted as a Rugby League Immortal.

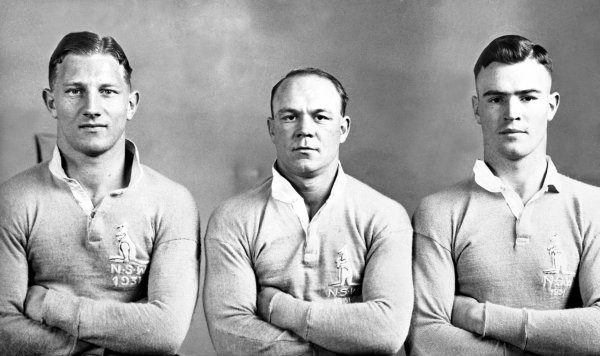
1931 NSW reps Brown, Norman and Stehr

== Background ==
Brown was born Sydney, New South Wales, Australia.

As a child, Brown lost the top of his thumb in a lawn-mowing accident. While playing football at school he badly broke an arm, dislocating the elbow and causing severe nerve damage which cost him the use of two fingers on his right hand. Despite these setbacks Brown was an all-round sportsman – an A-grade tennis player, champion junior surfer and a representative cricketer. Brown attended Sydney's Waverley College under the tuition of Arthur Hennessy, Australia's first ever rugby league test captain, who was the school sporting coach at the time.

== Stellar early career ==
The powerfully built centre joined the Eastern Suburbs club straight out of school. After just a handful of lower grade games Brown was promoted to the top grade. The following year aged just eighteen Brown was selected to represent his state – New South Wales in 3 interstate matches against Queensland. Soon after the teenager lost all his hair, after contracting a virus while swimming and took to wearing a hairpiece to cover his baldness.

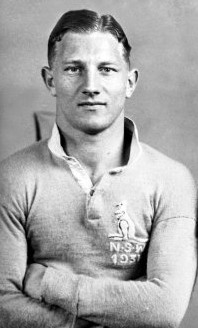
Brown on début for NSW 1931, aged 18 and before his hair loss

At the beginning of the 1932 season, aged just nineteen years and twelve days, Brown was named captain of the Eastern Suburbs club. The following year he was selected for the 1933–34 Kangaroo tour of Great Britain. On the boat trip over one of his teammates, unable to stand the sight of Brown's hairpiece any longer, tossed it out one of the ship's portholes, causing him to begin wearing his trademark headgear. On the tour he played in 32 matches, including all 3 Tests, scoring 285 points, at the time the greatest number ever attained by an Australian player on tour from 19 tries and 114 goals. In an exhibition match played in on a snow-covered ground between England and Australia, (the first rugby league game played on French soil) Brown scored 6 tries and kicked 9 goals for a total of 36 points.

== Record breaking years ==
Once home in Sydney, Brown led a star-studded Easts side to the 1934 minor premiership, losing to Western Suburbs in the premiership decider. In the following season – 1935, Easts lost just 1 match and captured their fifth premiership,

That 1935 season was Brown's best. In just fifteen club matches he scored 244 points (38 tries, 65 goals). His 1935 record try tally still stands: indeed Newtown winger Ray Preston remains the only other player to score more than 30 tries in a season, totaling 34 during the 1954 season. In the first round match against Canterbury-Bankstown Brown scored a premiership record 45 points (5 tries, 15 goals), with the 15 goal tally also standing as the record for goals in a match. In the second round match against Canterbury-Bankstown he scored a further 38 points (6 tries, 10 goals), which stands as the equal record for the second-most points in a premiership match. He recorded further records in round 16 when he scored 26 (4 tries, 7 goals) against North Sydney then in round 18 against Balmain he notched up a further 32 points, from 6 tries and 7 goals. The pointscoring wizard amassed 385 points that year (incorporating all Eastern Suburbs and representative matches). What make his records all the more impressive is that during the 1934, 1935 and 1936 seasons Brown was not the only goalkicker at the club, with teammate Jack Beaton taking many of the easier shots for goal.

On 28 September 1935, at just 22 years and 177 days Brown was named as the youngest ever Australian captain, and led his country to a series victory over New Zealand. In 1936 Easts again took out the NSWRL season title, this time finishing undefeated.

== Warrington and final playing years ==
At the end of the 1936 season Brown accepted an offer from English rugby league club, Warrington, a four-year deal worth 1,000 pounds for the first season (based on increases in average earnings, this would be approximately £161,800 in 2013).

Brown played at centre and scored 2-tries in Warrington's 8–4 victory over Barrow in the 1937–38 Lancashire Cup Final during the 1937–38 season at Central Park, Wigan on Saturday 23 October 1937.

Brown played 93 matches for the Warrington Wolves, scoring 326 points – 48 tries and 91 goals. In a cup semi final against St Helens Brown kicked what he considers to be his finest goal, it is recounted this way.

"with the scores locked at 2-all in the dying moments Warrington were awarded a penalty near the touch-line and five-yards on their own side of half-way, Brown took the shot, guiding it between the posts to give Warrington a 4–2 win and a spot in the Cup final."

But Brown never enjoyed quite the same level of success in England; he bought out the final year of his contract and returned home.

Once home Brown rejoined the Eastern Suburbs club, playing in the remaining matches of the 1939 season. In 1940 with Dave Brown appointed as captain and coach of the side, Easts finished the year at the top of the league ladder and despite losing Brown with a leg injury, managed to capture another premiership. 1941 was to be Brown's last season. Easts again finished first at the end of the regular season but went down to St George in the premiership decider. Brown at twenty-nine years old announced his retirement following the match.

== Post-football ==
After his retirement from the game Brown took up a position as the games liaison officer, promoting rugby league in schools. He also spent time coaching and promoting the game in South Africa

Dave Brown 'The Bradman of League' died from cancer in 1974, 40 days before his 61st birthday. He was survived by two sisters, nephews, nieces, and his records.

== Accolades ==
In 2003 he was admitted into the Australian Rugby League Hall of Fame. Up until 1986 the award for the best player in the Grand Final each year was known as the Dave Brown Medal. Dave Brown was also named in the centres, alongside Dally Messenger in the Eastern Suburbs club's greatest team. Additionally, a plaque in the Walk of Honour at the Sydney Cricket Ground commemorates his career.

In February 2008, Brown was named in the list of Australia's 100 Greatest Players (1908–2007) which was commissioned by the NRL and ARL to celebrate the code's centenary year in Australia. In 2008 Brown was also named in New South Wales' rugby league team of the century.

Joining fellow pre-WWII greats Dally Messenger and Frank Burge, Brown was inducted as a Rugby League Immortal in 2018, along with recent greats Norm Provan and Mal Meninga.

Sporting positions
Preceded by Mick Madsen	Captain Australia; 1935-1936	Succeeded by Wally Prigg
