= 1940 Eastern Suburbs season =

← 1939	1941 →

The 1940 Eastern Suburbs DRLFC season was the 33rd in the club's history. Coached by Dave Brown and captained by Ray Stehr they competed in the New South Wales Rugby Football League's 1940 season, finishing the season in 1st place (out of 8 teams) and successfully defeating Canterbury-Bankstown in the final to claim their 8th premiership.

== Details ==
Led by forward Ray Stehr, there was still plenty of talent left in the East's side of 1940 and they went on to take the minor premiership, before gaining revenge on Canterbury, claiming their fourth titles in six seasons.

The line-up for the 1940 season included: Jack Arnold * Wal Bamford * Doug Bartlett * Dave Brown * William Brew * S.Callaghan * Owen Campbell * John Clarke * Dick Dunn * Noel Hollingdale * Sel Lisle * Fred May * K.McLean * Andy Norval * Rod O'Loan * Henry 'harry' Pierce * Sid 'Joe' Pearce * Ray Stehr.

== Results ==
- Premiership Round 1, Eastern Suburbs 23 ( Arnold, Dunn, May, Mclean, Pierce tries; Arnold (2), Bartlett, Dunn goals ) defeated (Canterbury Bankstown) 9 (R. NcCallum try; R. McCarter 2, T. Anderson goals ) at the Sydney Cricket Ground.
- Premiership Round 2, St George 12 defeated Eastern Suburbs 9 at Sydney Cricket Ground.
- Premiership Round 3, Eastern Suburbs 19 defeated South Sydney 12 at Sydney Sports Ground.
- Premiership Round 4, Newtown Jets 21 defeated Eastern Suburbs 13 at Henson Park.
- Premiership Round 5, Eastern Suburbs 33 defeated North Sydney 3 (Dru try) at the Sydney Sports Ground.
- Premiership Round 6, Eastern Suburbs 26 defeated Western Suburbs 11 at the Sydney Sports Ground.
- Premiership Round 7, Eastern Suburbs 26 beat Balmain 10 at Sydney Cricket Ground.
- Premiership Round 8, Canterbury Bankstown 13 beat Eastern Suburbs 7 at Belmore Oval.
- Premiership Round 9, St George 8 drew with Eastern Suburbs 8 at Sydney Cricket Ground.
- Premiership Round 10, Newtown 8 beat Eastern Suburbs 6 at Sydney Cricket Ground.
- Premiership Round 11, Eastern Suburbs 38 beat South Sydney 7 at Sydney Sports Ground.
- Premiership Round 12, Eastern Suburbs 16 beat Western Suburbs 12 at Pratten Park.
- Premiership Round 13, Eastern Suburbs 10 beat North Sydney 5 at North Sydney Oval.
- Premiership Round 14, Eastern Suburbs 16 beat Balmain 5 at Sydney Cricket Ground.

== Ladder ==
	Team	Pld	W	D	L	PF	PA	PD	Pts
1	Eastern Suburbs	14	9	1	4	250	136	+114	19
2	Newtown	14	9	0	5	261	200	+61	18
3	St. George	14	7	2	5	263	203	+60	16
4	Canterbury-Bankstown	14	8	0	6	204	195	+9	16
5	Balmain	14	7	1	6	199	162	+37	15
6	South Sydney	14	7	0	7	165	259	-94	14
7	North Sydney	14	4	0	10	156	243	-87	8
8	Western Suburbs	14	3	0	11	159	259	-100	6

== Final Series ==
=== Semi-final ===
Eastern Suburbs semi-final against St George was played at the Sydney Cricket Ground. The match was played in strong wind & heavy rain. The Tricolurs progressed to the premiership decider by defeating St George 10 points to 3.

Eastern Suburbs 10 (A. Norval, D. Dunn tries; D. Bartlett 2 goals)

defeated

Saint George 3 (J. Lindwall try)

=== Premiership Final ===
Eastern Suburbs	Position	Canterbury-Bankstown
Doug Bartlett	FB	Lindsay Johnson
Rod O'Loan	WG	Edgar Newham
Stan Callaghan	CE	Merv Denton
Dick Dunn	CE	Bob Russell
Bill Brew	WG	Jack Bonnyman (c)
Fred May	FE	Ted Anderson
Sel Lisle	HB	Roy McCarter
Ray Stehr (c)	PR	Jim Gibbs
Noel Hollingdale	HK	Roy Kirkaldy
John Clarke	PR	Jack Reilly
Harry Pierce	SR	Bob Allison
Sid Pearce	SR	Bob Farrar
Andrew Norval	LK	Gordon Clunas
Dave Brown	Coach	Alan Brady

Eastern Suburbs captain-coach Dave Brown, still suffering the effects of a leg injury that had kept him out of the Roosters semi-final victory over St George, was forced to withdraw on the morning of the match. His replacement, William Brew, scored the opening try early in the match, after backing up second rower Sid "Joe" Pearce. At the break Canterbury only trailed by two. However East's ended any hopes of a comeback, scoring just after the resumption. The match was never in any danger of being lost from that point, with Eastern suburb's burly forwards storming away in the latter stages. The young Easts side had an average age of just 20 years. They overcame Canterbury by six tries to two.

Eastern Suburbs 24 (Tries: Pierce 2, O'Loan, Brew, Pearce, Clarke. Goals: Dunn 2 )

defeated

Canterbury-Bankstown 14 (Tries: Bonnyman, Denton. Goals: Johnson 4)

Preceded by 1939	Season; 1940	Succeeded by 1941
