= 1938 NSWRFL season =

Rugby league competition

1938 New South Wales Rugby Football League
- Teams: 8
- Premiers: Canterbury-Bankstown (1st title)
- Minor premiers: Canterbury-Bankstown (1st title)
- Matches played: 59
- Points scored: 1756
- Top points scorer: Tom Kirk (94)
- Wooden spoon: St. George (3rd spoon)
- Top try-scorer: Don Manson (13)

The 1938 New South Wales Rugby Football League premiership was the thirty-first season of Sydney’s top-grade rugby league club competition, Australia’s first. The withdrawal of the University club at the end of the previous season saw eight teams from across the city contest the premiership, which lasted from April until September and culminated in Canterbury-Bankstown's victory over Eastern Suburbs in the final.

== Teams ==
With the exit of University after the previous season, 1938 saw the NSWRFL involve eight clubs for the first time since 1934.

- Balmain, formed on January 23, 1908, at Balmain Town Hall
- Canterbury-Bankstown
- Eastern Suburbs, formed on January 24, 1908, at Paddington Town Hall
- Newtown, formed on January 14, 1908
- North Sydney, formed on February 7, 1908
- South Sydney, formed on January 17, 1908, at Redfern Town Hall
- St. George, formed on November 8, 1920, at Kogarah School of Arts
- Western Suburbs, formed on February 4, 1908

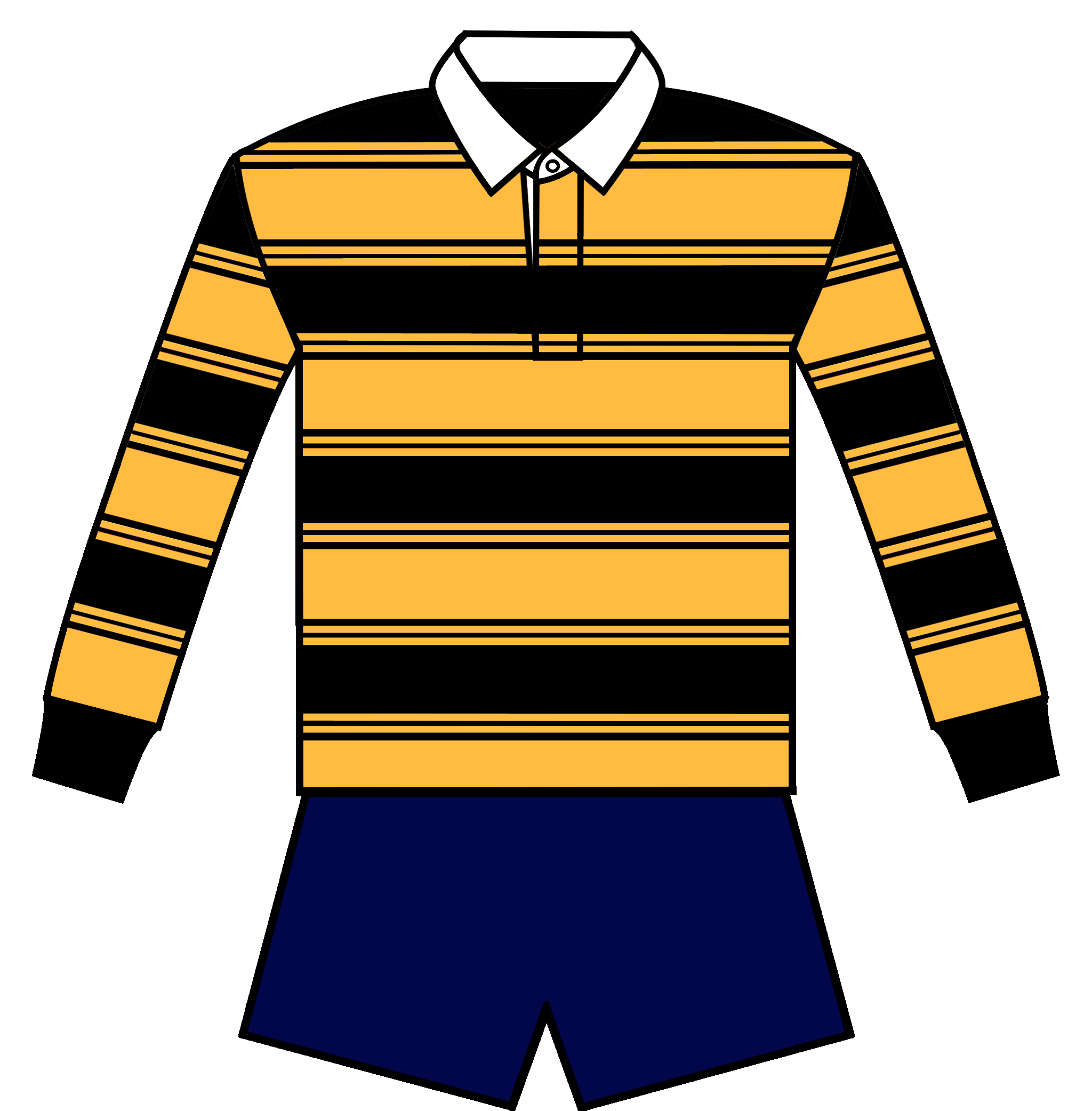
Balmain 31st season Ground: Leichhardt Oval; Coach: Bill Kelly; Captain: Frank Hyde

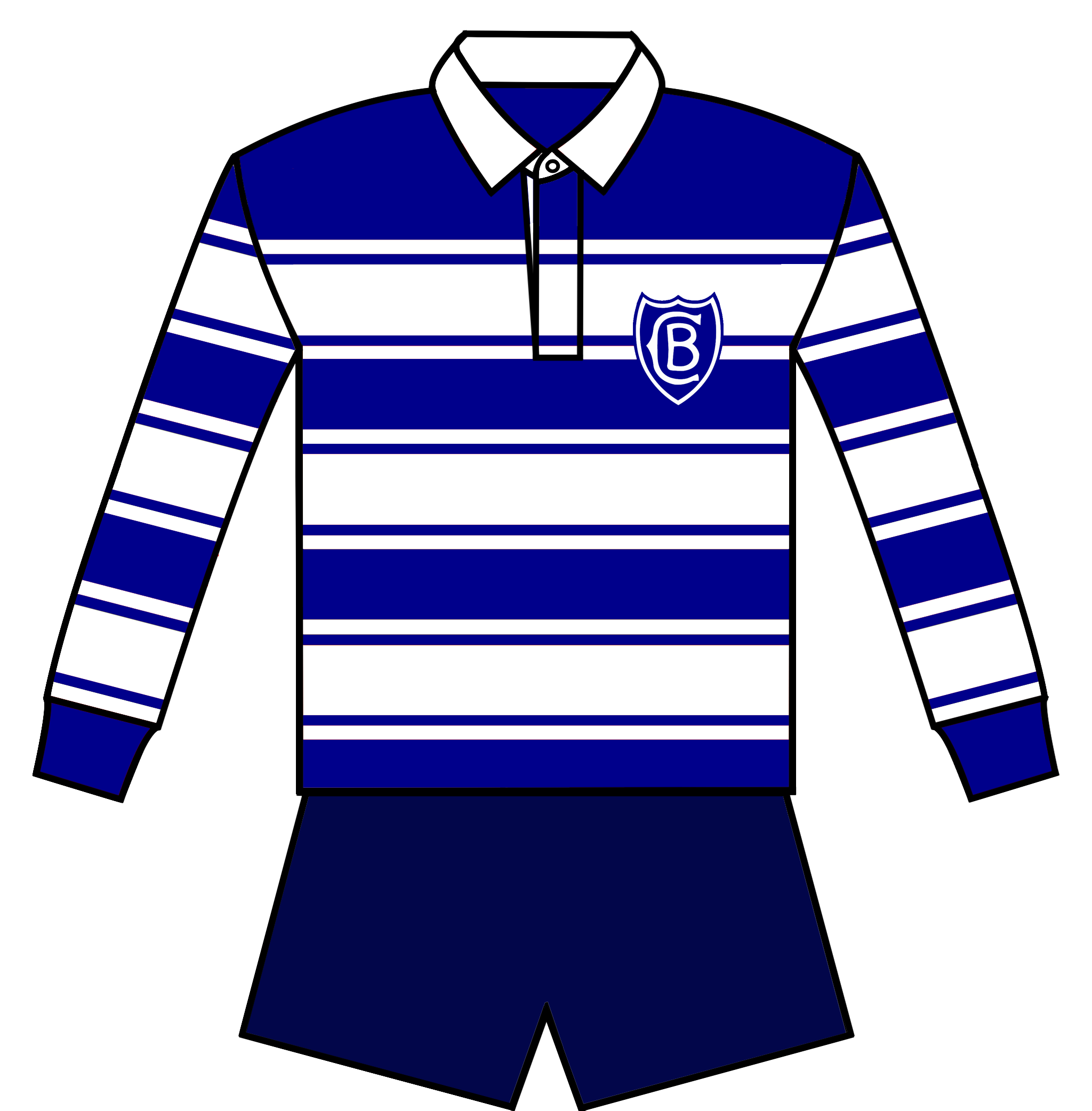
Canterbury-Bankstown 4th season Ground: Belmore Oval; Coach: Jimmy Craig; Captain: Alan Brady

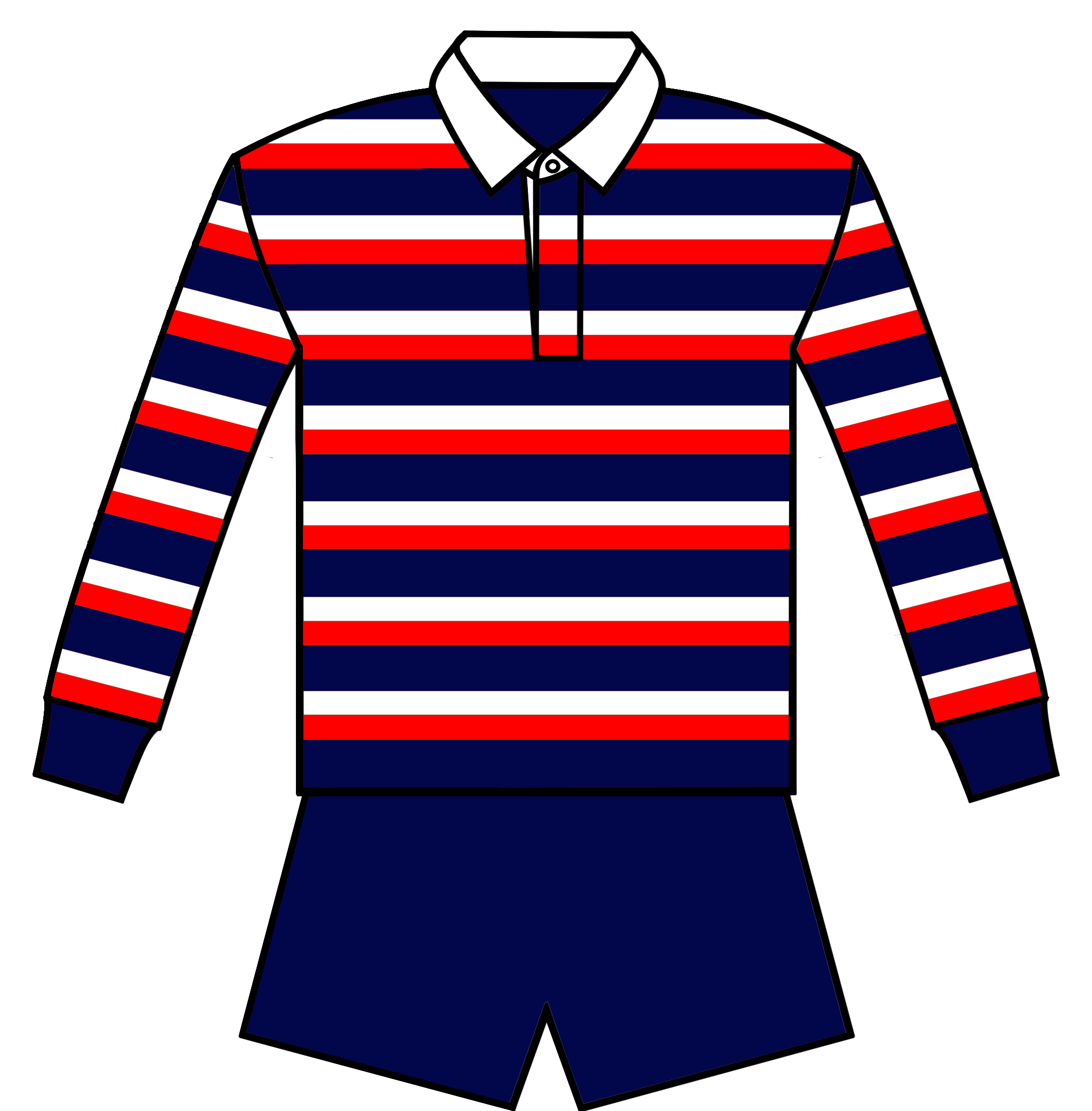
Eastern Suburbs 31st season Ground: Sydney Sports Ground; Coach:Arthur Halloway; Captain: Ray Stehr

Newtown 31st season Ground: Henson Park; Coach: Charles 'Boxer' Russell; Captain: Allan Ellis, Tom Nevin

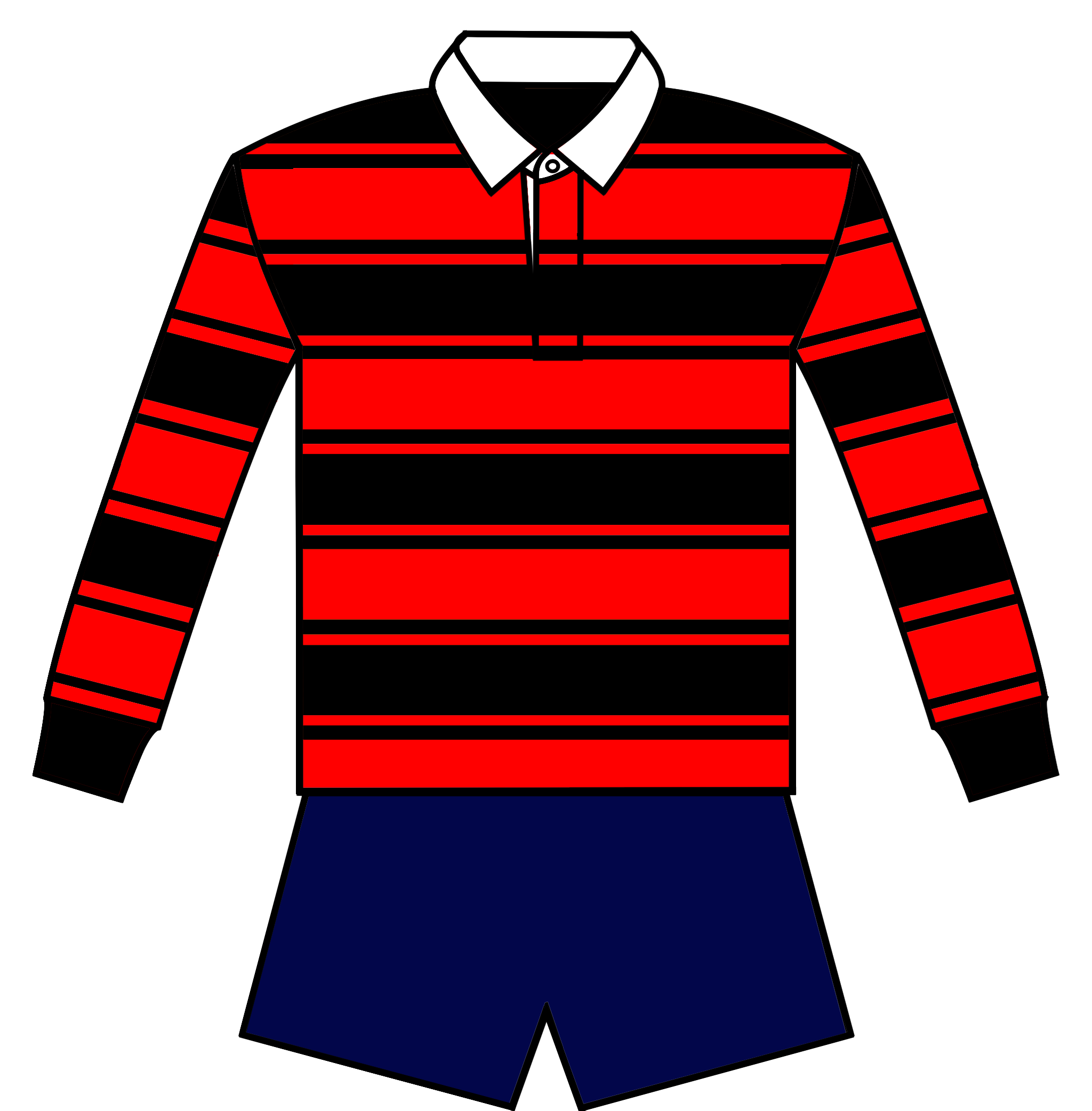
North Sydney 31st season Ground: North Sydney Oval; Coach: Bob Williams; Captain: Roy Thompson

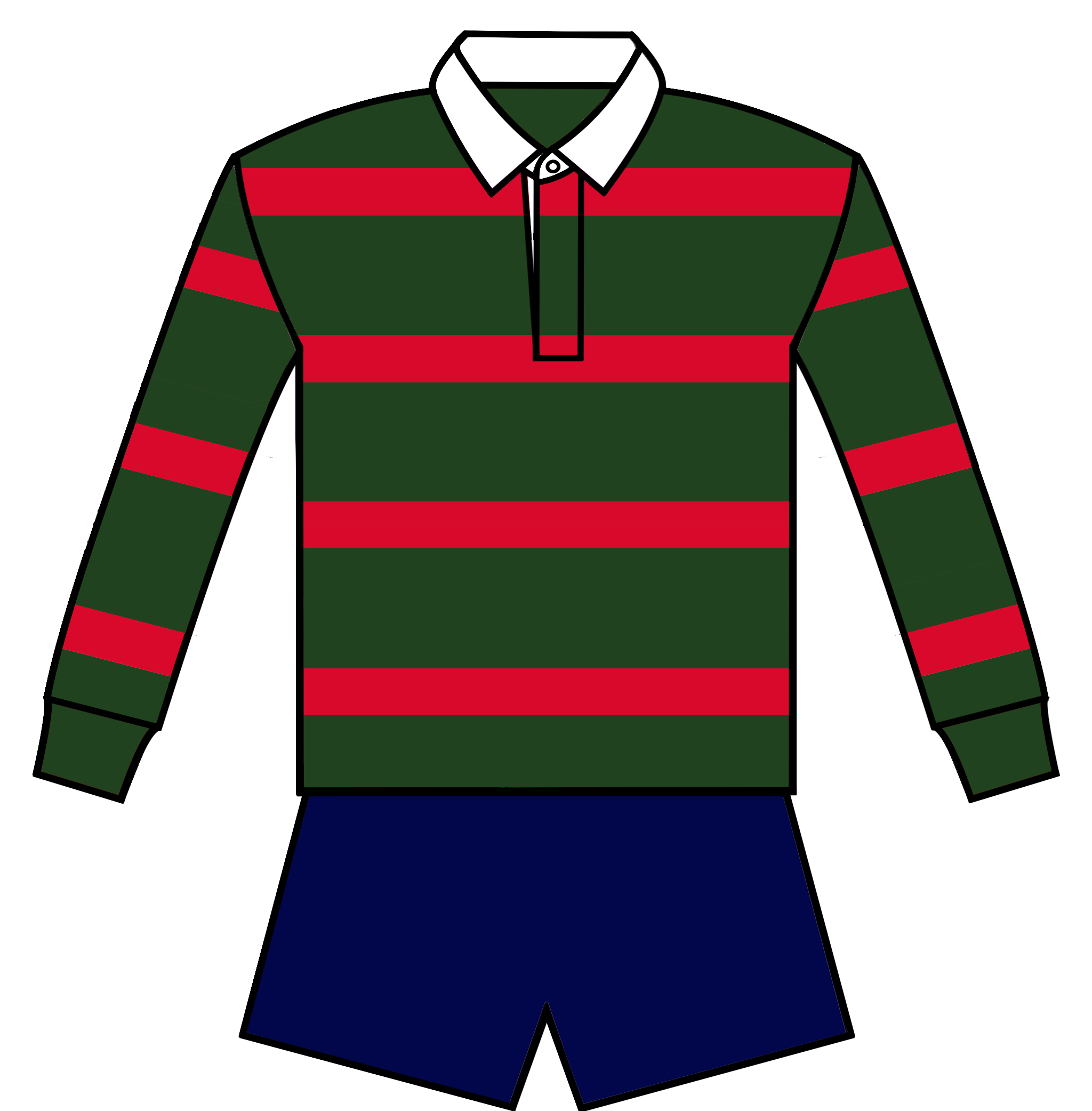
South Sydney 31st season Ground: Sydney Cricket Ground; Coach: Charlie Lynch; Captain: Fred Felsch

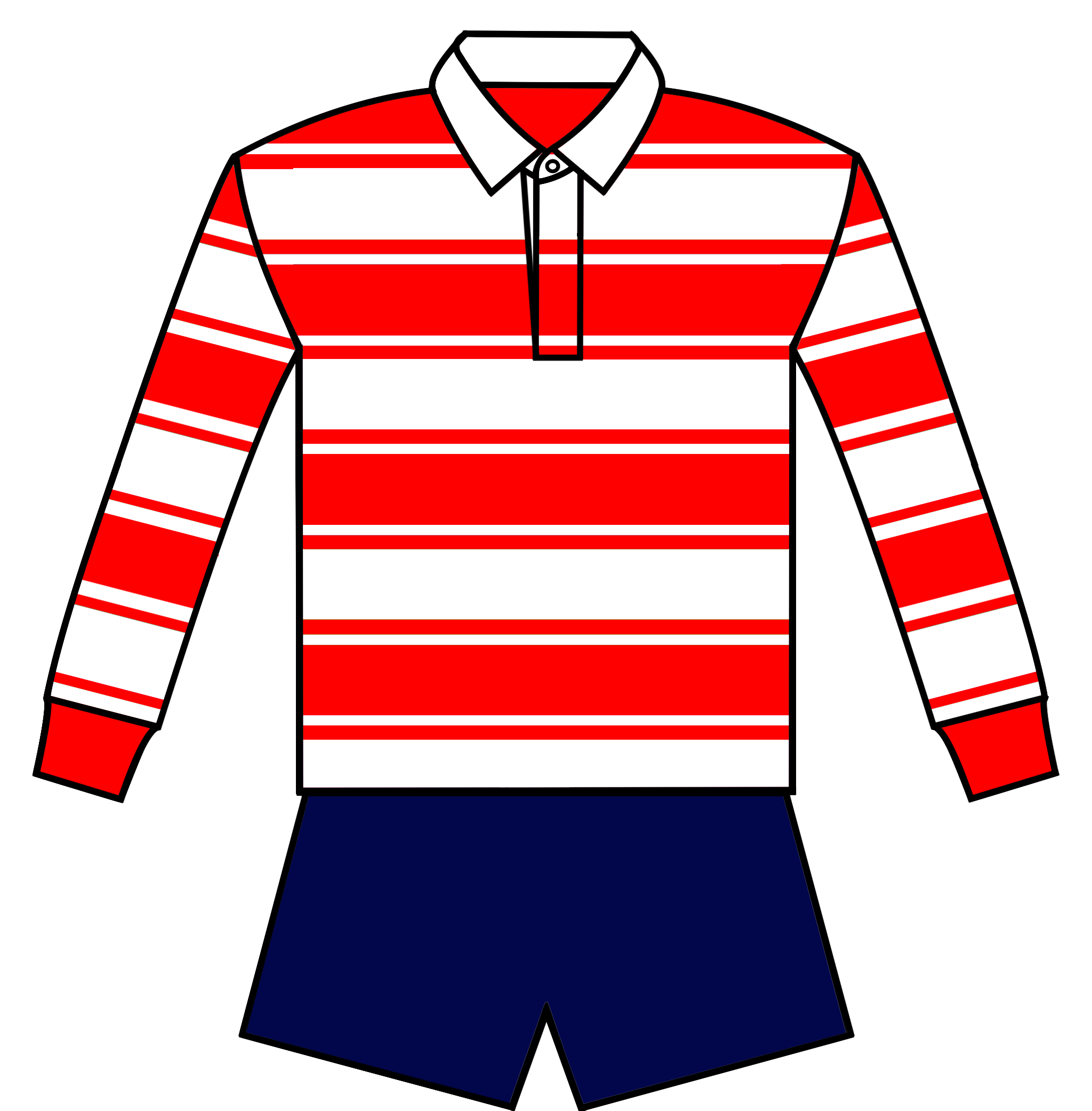
St. George 18th season Ground: Earl Park; Captain-coach: Norm Pope

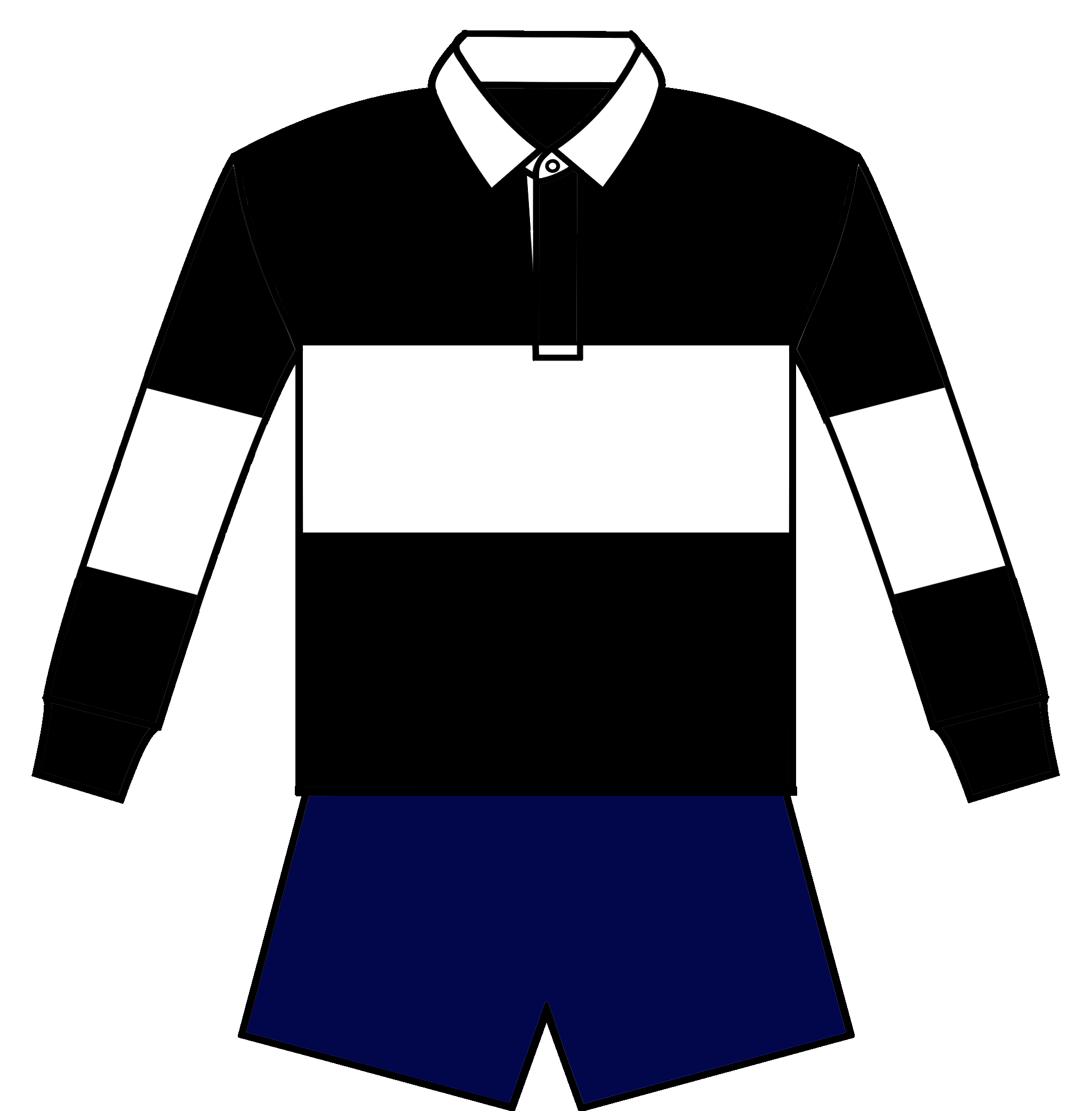
Western Suburbs 31st season Ground: Pratten Park; Coach: Cec Fifield; Captain: Jimmy Sharman

== Ladder ==
| | Team | Pld | W | D | L | PF | PA | PD | Pts |
|---|---|---|---|---|---|---|---|---|---|
| 1 | Canterbury | 14 | 11 | 2 | 1 | 276 | 135 | +141 | 24 |
| 2 | South Sydney | 14 | 9 | 1 | 4 | 254 | 145 | +109 | 19 |
| 3 | Balmain | 14 | 7 | 1 | 6 | 238 | 176 | +62 | 15 |
| 4 | Eastern Suburbs | 14 | 6 | 3 | 5 | 228 | 203 | +25 | 15 |
| 5 | North Sydney | 14 | 6 | 0 | 8 | 163 | 220 | -57 | 12 |
| 6 | Newtown | 14 | 5 | 1 | 8 | 174 | 228 | -54 | 11 |
| 7 | Western Suburbs | 14 | 4 | 1 | 9 | 155 | 265 | -110 | 9 |
| 8 | St. George | 14 | 3 | 1 | 10 | 159 | 275 | -116 | 7 |

== Finals ==
In the two semi finals, the top ranked team Canterbury beat their lower-ranked opponent Balmain with the fourth ranked team Eastern Suburbs defeating their higher-ranked opponent South Sydney. The two winners then played in the Final.

Semi-finals
20 August 1938 - Sydney Cricket Ground
Canterbury | 31
Balmain | 24
27 August 1938 - Sydney Cricket Ground
Eastern Suburbs | 19
South Sydney | 10

Final
3 September 1938 - Sydney Cricket Ground
Canterbury | 19
Eastern Suburbs | 6

=== 2nd Semi Final ===
The qualifier between South Sydney and Eastern Suburbs was reported in the Sydney Morning Herald on 29 August 1938:

The match which was hard, but not spectacular, was watched by 14,161 people. The form of Eastern Suburbs was not worthy of a team which has fought its way to the finals, and a considerable improvement will have to be shown if Eastern Suburbs is to have a reasonable chance of beating Canterbury-Bankstown .

— SMH 22 Sept 2014

The two Sydney teams would not meet in another finals match until season 2014.

=== Premiership Final ===
| Canterbury-Bankstown | Position | Eastern Suburbs |
|---|---|---|
| 13. Tom Kirk | FB | 15. Jim Norton |
| 18. Edgar Newham | WG | 43. Percy Dermond |
| 10. Alan Brady (c) | CE | 23. Dick Dunn |
| 11. Jim Champion | CE | 22. Stan Callaghan |
| 12. Joe Gartner | WG | 21. Aiden Cairns |
| 17. Jim Duncombe | FE | 42. Laurie Pickup |
| 7. Roy McCarter | HB | 7. Fred Robinson |
| 1. Eddie Burns | PR | 5. Jack Arnold |
| 2. Roy Kirkaldy | HK | 31. Noel Hollingdale |
| 3. Henry Porter | PR | 1. Ray Stehr (c) |
| 5. Jack McCormack | SR | 4. Harry Pierce |
| 4. Roy McCallum | SR | 16. Sid Pearce |
| 6. Frank Sponberg | LK | 6. Andy Norval |
| Jimmy Craig | Coach | Arthur Halloway |

In only the fourth year after admission to the Sydney first grade competition Canterbury fielded a side which dominated the regular season and set themselves up for their first title assault against Eastern Suburbs, themselves looking to win a fourth successive premiership. A crowd of 20,287 was on hand at the Sydney Cricket Ground with the game officiated by Tom McMahon (the younger of the two pre-war referees of that name).

The first half was a dour struggle for supremacy. Canterbury-Bankstown appeared to have the upper hand but Easts’ Cairns scored first and it took two penalty goals by Canterbury’s fullback Tommy Kirk to give the Berries a four points to three lead at half-time.

The Roosters scored another try early in the second half when Dick Dunn dived over after the Easts backline had created an overlap. Again the conversion was missed.

Canterbury-Bankstown came back at Easts with great determination and nearly scored on several occasions. Eventually Berries’ reserve grader Jim Duncombe, who was in the team because of the illness of Aub Mitchell, was the first man to cross for the blue and whites. A scrum had gone down near Easts’ line, Canterbury’s Roy McCarter worked a blind side move and Duncombe went through an opening to score. Kirk kicked the goal, and Canterbury-Bankstown led by nine points to six.

The scores were close until about twenty minutes before the end, and then Canterbury made a final and determined rally. Easts' try line was attacked continuously. Joe Gartner, the Canterbury-Bankstown winger, went over for two excellent tries, beating the defence with side-stepping runs. Both were converted, the second by McCarter, the first by Kirk a fine effort from the sideline. Gartner's two tries put the issue beyond doubt, giving Canterbury a lead of 19 to 6.

Canterbury’s excellent teamwork was the greatest factor in its success and the determined work of its forwards. They were opposed to an almost all-international Roosters pack with the experience of Ray Stehr and dangerous trygetters in Norval, Pearce, and Pierce. Canterbury's State hooker Roy Kirkaldy secured a good share of ball and with his front-row partners in Henry Porter and Eddie Burns continually stopped the Roosters attack, tackling themselves to a standstill. Nine seasons later in the 1947 Grand Final this Canterbury front three would still be dominating their opposition.

The other Canterbury forwards in Sponberg, McCallum and McCormack also played tirelessly and deservedly chaired their captain Alan Brady from the field to enthusiastic cheers from the Canterbury fans celebrating their first premiership and to sporting congratulations from the Eastern Suburbs men.

This was the first of five Grand Finals which the Bulldogs and Roosters have contested against each other, with subsequent Grand Finals between the two teams coming in 1940, 1974, 1980 and most recently, 2004. The Roosters would win in 1940 and 1974, but the Bulldogs would emerge victorious from their next two season-deciding encounters.

Canterbury-Bankstown 19 (Tries: Gartner 2, Duncombe. Goals: Kirk 4, McCarter)

defeated

Eastern Suburbs 6 (Tries: Cairns, Dunn)
