= 1940 NSWRFL season =

Rugby league competition

1940 New South Wales Rugby Football League
- Teams: 8
- Premiers: Eastern Suburbs (8th title)
- Minor premiers: Eastern Suburbs (9th title)
- Matches played: 59
- Points scored: 1738
- Top points scorer(s): Tom Kirk (99)
- Wooden spoon: Western Suburbs (7th spoon)
- Top try-scorer(s): Jack Lindwall (19)

The 1940 New South Wales Rugby Football League premiership was the thirty-third season of Sydney’s top-level rugby league club competition, Australia’s first. Eight teams from across the city contested the premiership during the season, which lasted from April until August, culminating in Eastern Suburbs’ victory over Canterbury-Bankstown in the final.

== Season summary ==
For this season St. George returned to Hurstville Oval as their home ground.

=== Teams ===
- Balmain, formed on January 23, 1908, at Balmain Town Hall
- Canterbury-Bankstown
- Eastern Suburbs, formed on January 24, 1908, at Paddington Town Hall
- Newtown, formed on January 14, 1908
- North Sydney, formed on February 7, 1908, at the North Sydney School of Arts in Mount Street
- South Sydney, formed on January 17, 1908, at Redfern Town Hall
- St. George, formed on November 8, 1920, at Kogarah School of Arts
- Western Suburbs, formed on February 4, 1908

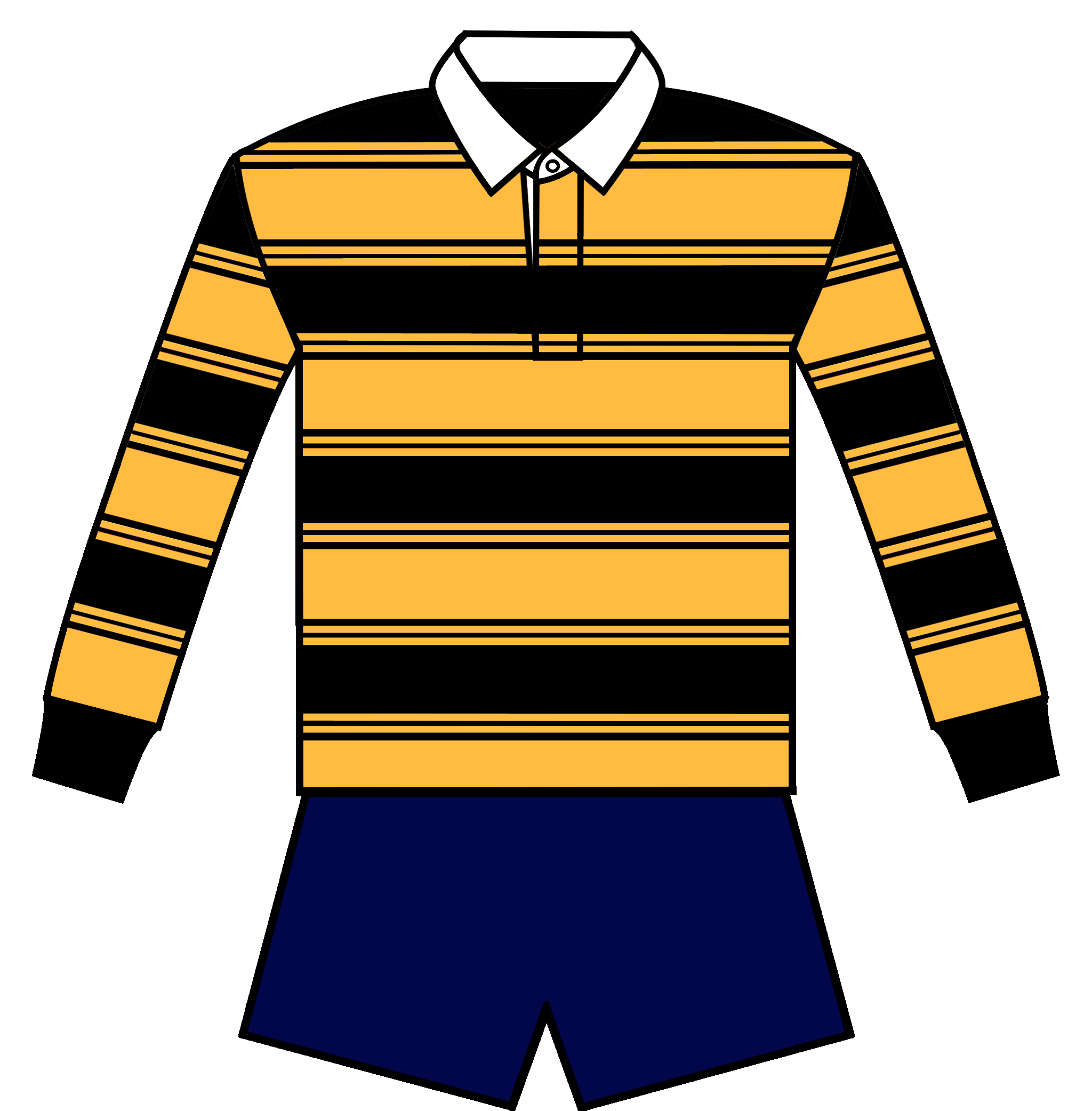
Balmain 33rd season Ground: Leichhardt Oval; Coach: Bill Kelly; Captain: Sid Goodwin

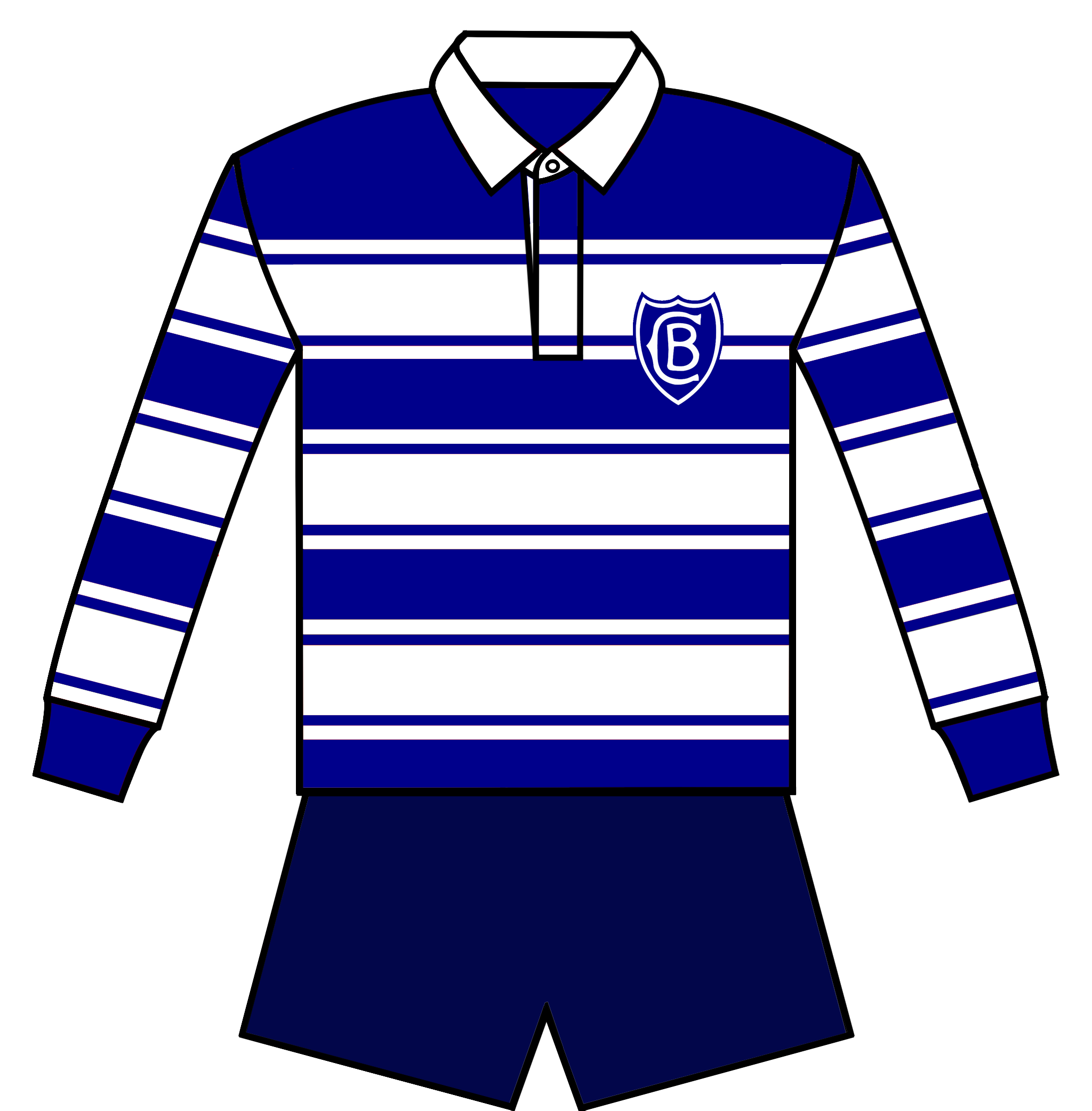
Canterbury-Bankstown 6th season Ground: Belmore Oval; Coach: Alan Brady; Captain: Alan Brady→Jack Bonnyman

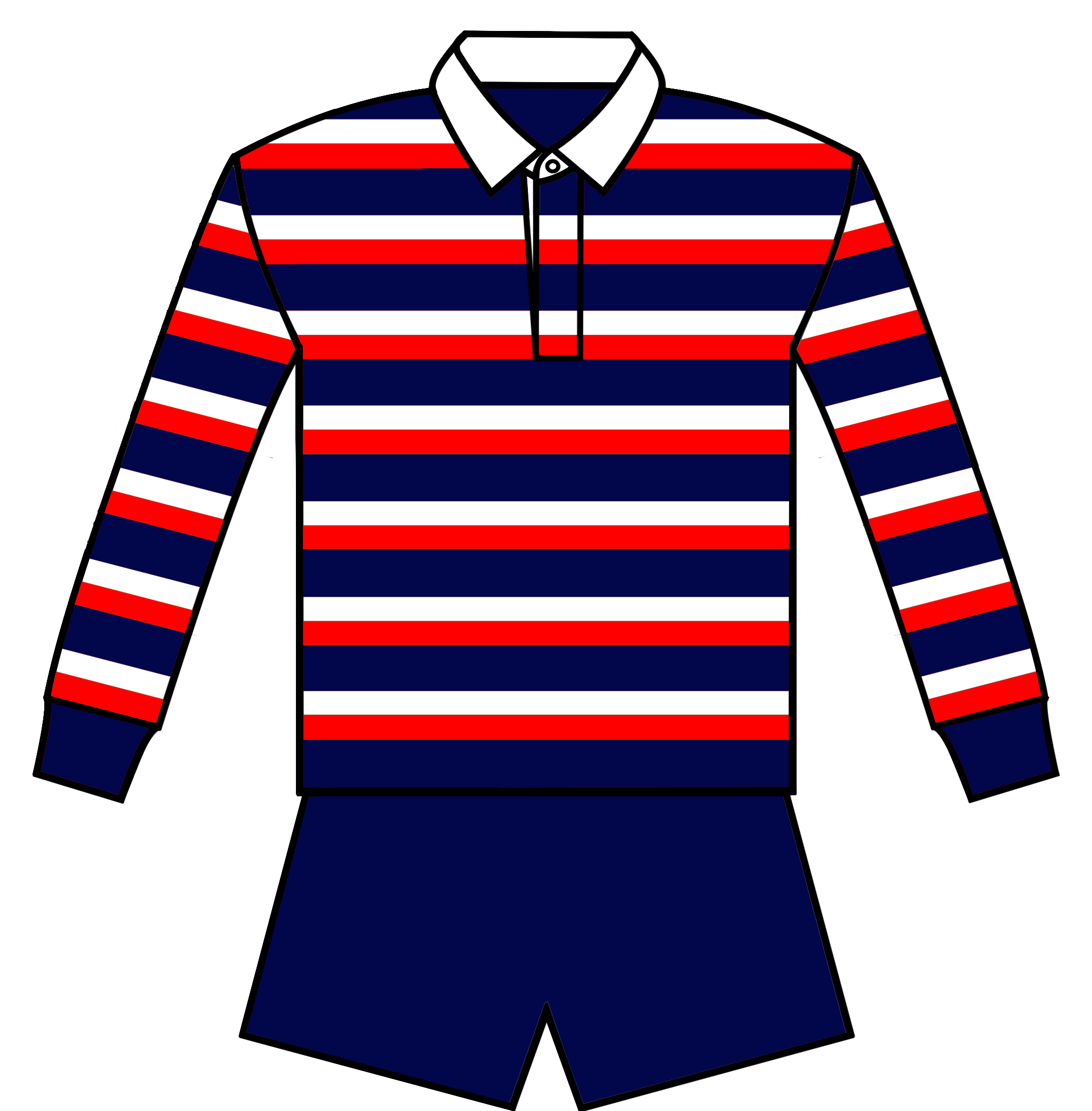
Eastern Suburbs 33rd season Ground: Sydney Sports Ground; Coach: Dave Brown; Captain: Ray Stehr

Newtown 33rd season Ground: Henson Park; Coach: Frank Burge; Captain: Percy Williams

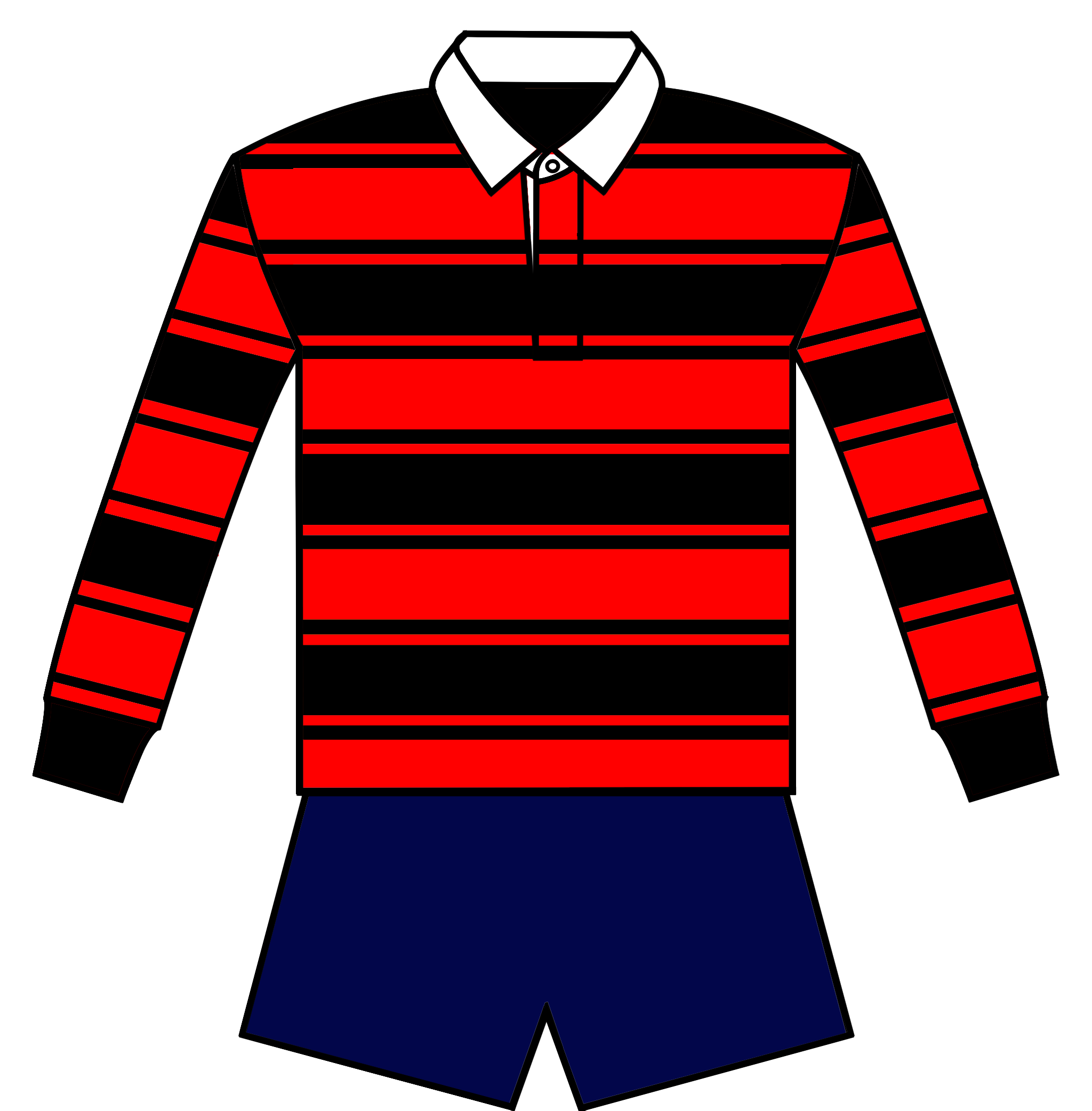
North Sydney 33rd season Ground: North Sydney Oval; Coach: Arthur Halloway; Captain: Roy Thompson

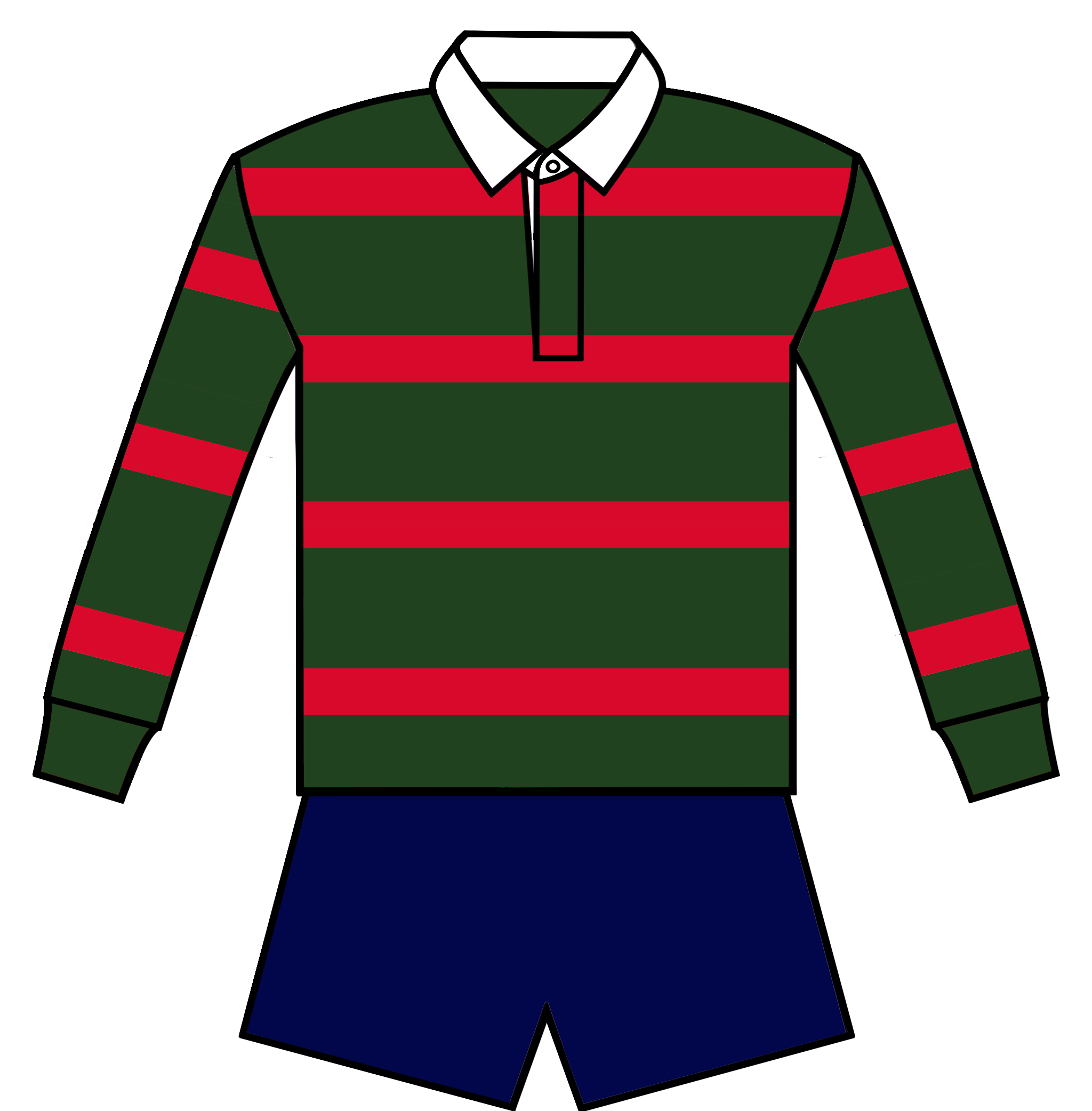
South Sydney 33rd season Ground: Sydney Sports Ground; Coach: Charlie Lynch; Captain: Fred Felsch

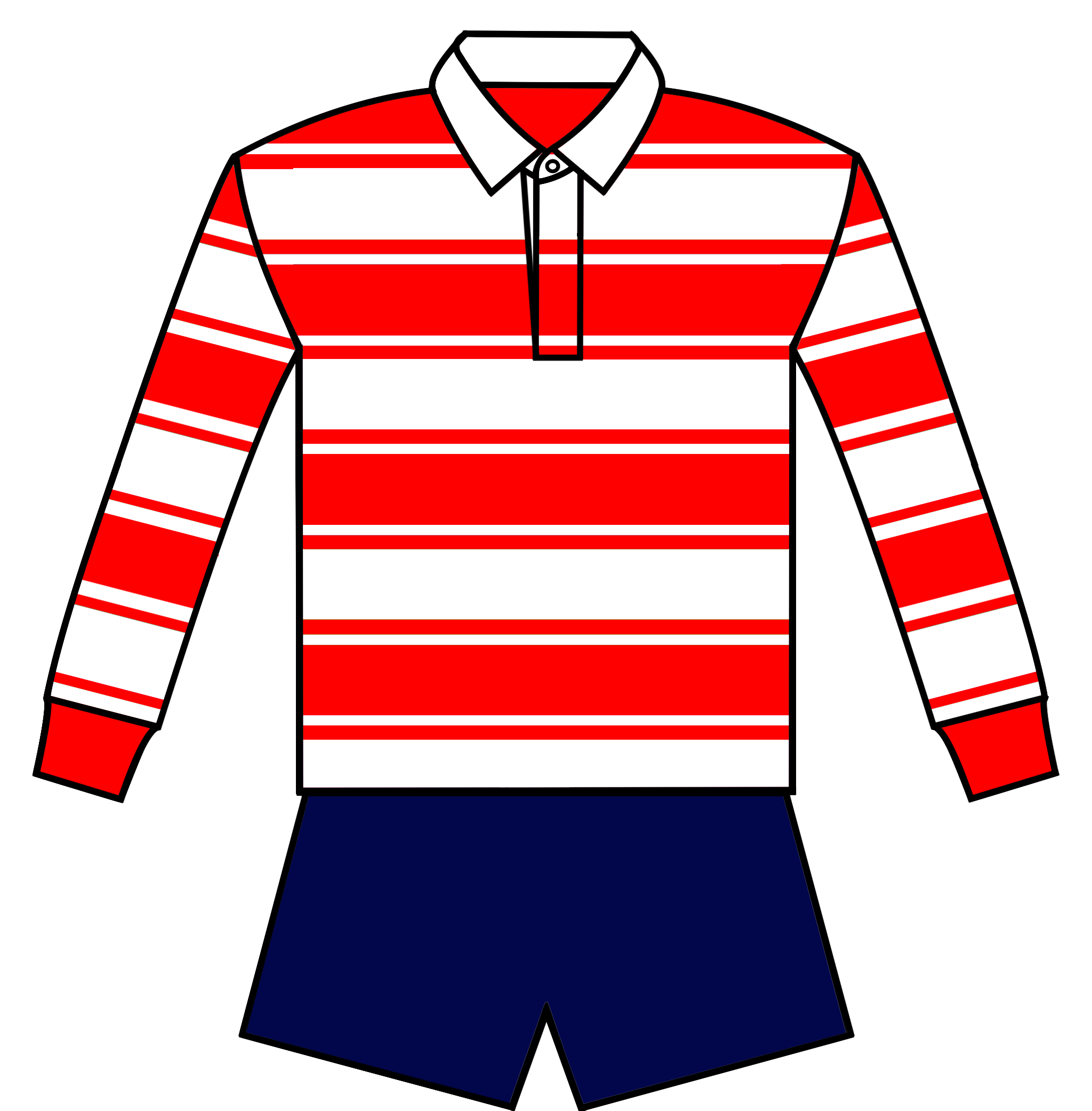
St. George 20th season Ground: Hurstville Oval; Captain-coach: Neville Smith

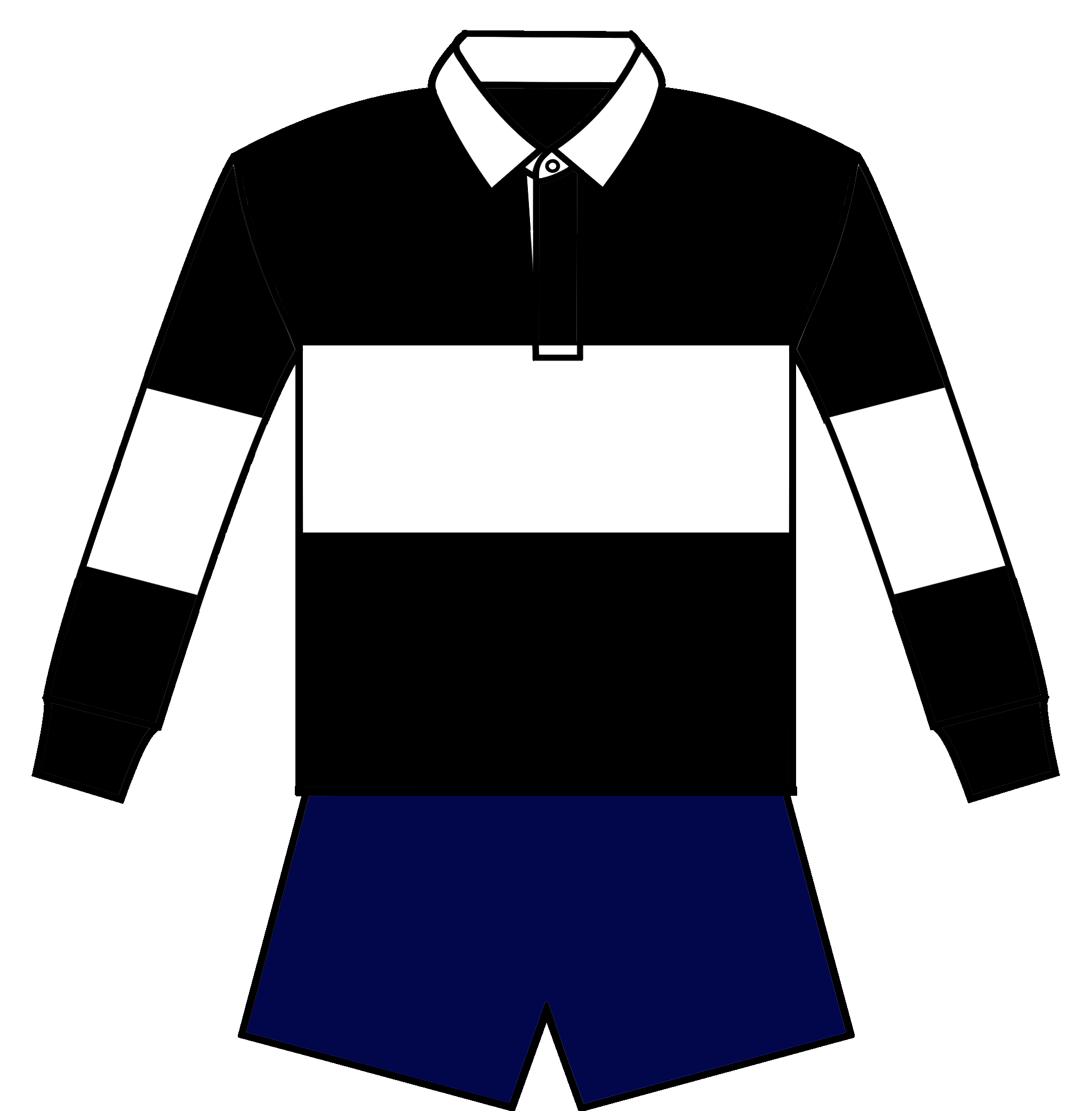
Western Suburbs 33rd season Ground: Pratten Park; Captain-Coach: Max Gray

== Ladder ==
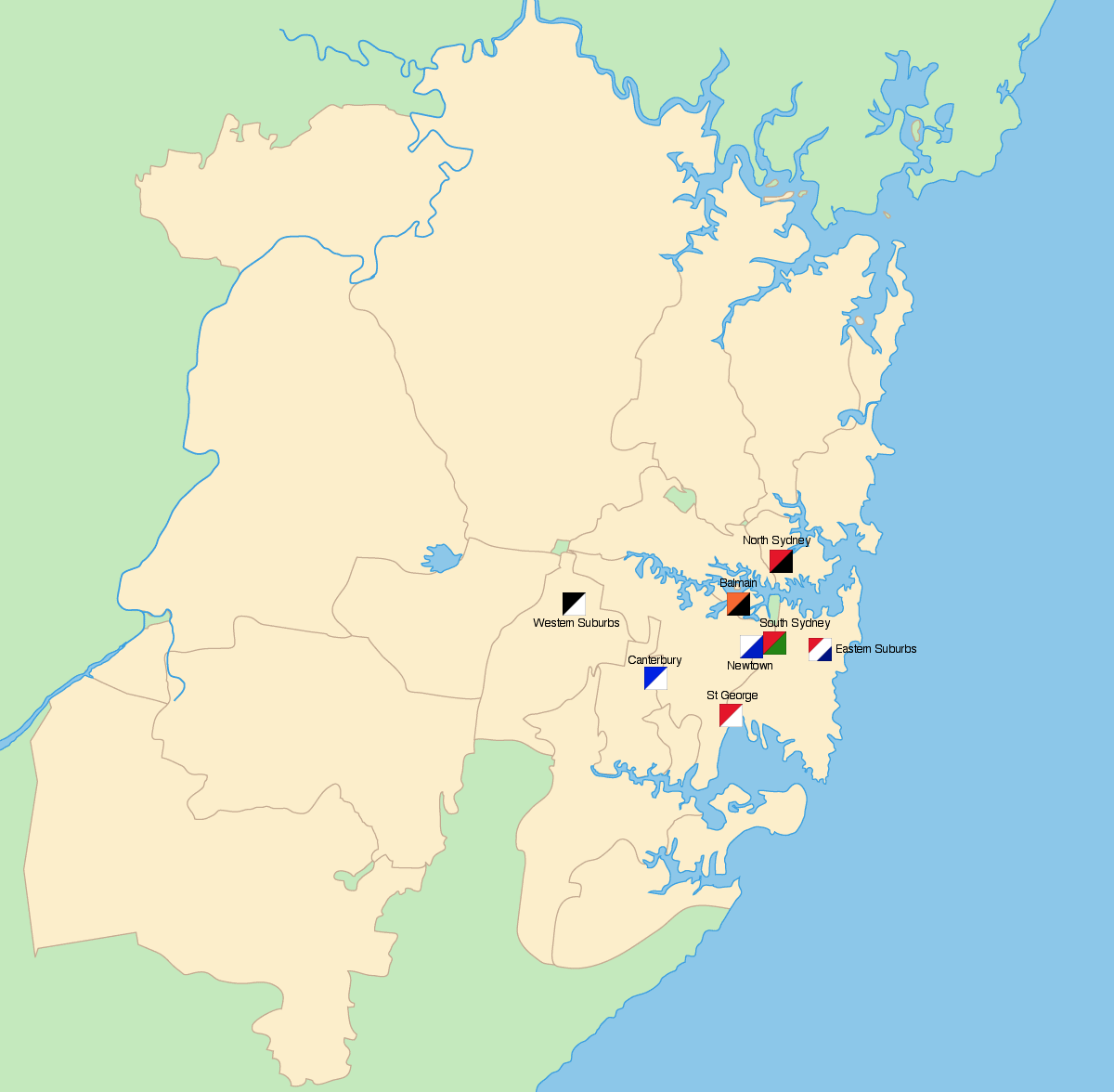
The geographical locations of the teams that contested the 1940 premiership across Sydney.

	Team	Pld	W	D	L	PF	PA	PD	Pts
1	Eastern Suburbs	14	9	1	4	250	136	+114	19
2	Newtown	14	9	0	5	261	200	+61	18
3	St. George	14	7	2	5	263	203	+60	16
4	Canterbury	14	8	0	6	204	195	+9	16
5	Balmain	14	7	1	6	199	162	+37	15
6	South Sydney	14	7	0	7	165	259	-94	14
7	North Sydney	14	4	0	10	156	243	-87	8
8	Western Suburbs	14	3	0	11	159	259	-100	6

== Finals ==
In the two semi finals, minor premiers Eastern Suburbs defeated St. George whilst fourth-placed Canterbury-Bankstown beat second-placed Newtown. Eastern Suburbs then beat Canterbury-Bankstown in the final to collect their eighth premiership.

Home	Score	Away	Match Information
Home	Score	Away	Date and Time	Venue	Referee	Crowd
Semifinals
Eastern Suburbs	10–3	St. George	17 August 1940	Sydney Cricket Ground	Jack O'Brien	17,473
Newtown	11–19	Canterbury-Bankstown	24 August 1940	Sydney Cricket Ground	Jack O'Brien	22,061
Final
Eastern Suburbs	24–14	Canterbury-Bankstown	31 August 1940	Sydney Cricket Ground	Jack O'Brien	24,167

=== Premiership final ===
Eastern Suburbs	Position	Canterbury-Bankstown
13. Doug Bartlett	FB	13. Lindsay Johnson
12. Rod O'Loan	WG	17. Edgar Newham
37. Stan Callaghan	CE	9. Merv Denton
10. Dick Dunn	CE	23. Bob Russell
22. Bill Brew	WG	11. Jack Bonnyman (c)
8. Fred May	FE	8. Ted Anderson
25. Sel Lisle	HB	7. Roy McCarter
1. Ray Stehr (c)	PR	14. Jim Gibbs
2. Noel Hollingdale	HK	2.Roy Kirkaldy
18. John Clarke	PR	6. Jack Reilly
4. Harry Pierce	SR	5. Bob Allison
5. Sid Pearce	SR	15. Bob Farrar
6. Andrew Norval	LK	31. Gordon Clunas
Dave Brown	Coach	Alan Brady

Led by their standard-setting captain-coach Dave Brown, the Tricolours continued their strong season performance with a semi-final victory over St George to gain a final berth.

Although Brown was ruled out on the morning of the decider with a leg injury, replacement Bill Brew slotted into the side and scored a try after backing up second rower Sid “Joe” Pearce who also scored the next try. The young Easts team, who averaged twenty years of age, overcame Canterbury by six tries to two.

Eastern Suburbs 24 (Tries: Pierce 2, O'Loan, Brew, Pearce, Clarke. Goals: Dunn 2 )

defeated

Canterbury-Bankstown 14 (Tries: Bonnyman, Denton. Goals: Johnson 4)
