= 1941 Eastern Suburbs season =

← 1940	1942 →

The 1941 Eastern Suburbs season was the 34th in the club's history. They competed in the New South Wales Rugby Football League's 1941 premiership, finishing regular season 1st (out of 8) to claim the club's 10th minor premiership. Easts then progressed to the premiership final which was lost to St. George.

== Details ==
The line-up for the 1940 season contained:- Jack Arnold, W. Bamford, D.Bartlett, Dave Brown, Bill Brew, John Clarke, Percy Dermond, Dick Dunn, Don Gulliver, Noel Hollingdale, Sel Lisle, Fred May, Larry O'Shea, Joe Pearce, Ray Stehr, Brian Walsh.

== Results ==
Premiership Round 1, Saturday 19 April 1941.

Eastern Suburbs 14 beat South Sydney 12 at Sydney Sports Ground.

Premiership Round 2, Saturday 26 April 1941. Eastern Suburbs 16 beat Western Suburbs 13 at Sydney Cricket Ground.

Premiership Round 3, Saturday 3 May 1941.

Eastern Suburbs 16 beat North Sydney 7 at North Sydney Oval.

Premiership Round 4, Saturday 10 May 1941.

Eastern Suburbs 25 beat Balmain 8 at Sydney Sports Ground.

Premiership Round 5, Saturday 17 May

Eastern Suburbs 13 beat Canterbury Bankstown 2 at Sydney Cricket Ground.

Premiership Round 6, Saturday 24 May 1941.

Newtown 4 beat Eastern Suburbs 3 at Henson Park.

Premiership Round 7, Saturday 31 June 1941.

St George 16 beat Eastern Suburbs 10 at Sydney Sports Ground.

Premiership Round 8, Saturday 21 June 1941.

South Sydney 22 beat Eastern Suburbs 15 at Sydney Sports Ground.

Premiership Round 9, Saturday 28 June 1941.

Eastern Suburbs 15 beat Western Suburbs 3 at Pratten Park.

Premiership Round 10, Sunday 6 July 1941.

Eastern Suburbs 24 beat North Sydney 3 at Trumper Park.

Premiership Round 11, Saturday 12 July 1941.

Balmain 19 beat Eastern Suburbs 12 at Sydney Sports Ground.

Premiership Round 12, Saturday 26 July 1941.

Eastern Suburbs 23( Tries ?; Goals ?, Dave Brown 6) beat Newtown 20 at Sydney Cricket Ground.

Easts were down 20 to 5 at half time. Dave Brown is said to have led a second half revival with a near faultless goal kicking display.

Premiership Round 13, Saturday 2 July 1941.

St George 20 beat Eastern Suburbs 16 at Hurstville Oval.

Premiership Round 14, Saturday 9 August 1941.

Eastern Suburbs 15 beat Canterbury Bankstown 11 at Belmore Oval.

== Table ==
	Team	Pld	W	D	L	PF	PA	PD	Pts
1	Eastern Suburbs	14	9	0	5	217	160	+57	18
2	Balmain	14	9	0	5	243	205	+38	18
3	Canterbury-Bankstown	14	9	0	5	205	182	+23	18
4	St. George	14	8	1	5	307	248	+59	17
5	Newtown	14	6	2	6	219	242	-23	14
6	Western Suburbs	14	6	0	8	247	226	+21	12
7	South Sydney	14	4	0	10	193	277	-84	8
8	North Sydney	14	3	1	10	171	262	-91	7

== Highlights ==
- Dave Brown announced his retirement at the end of the season.
