= 1938 Eastern Suburbs season =

← 1937	1939 →

Eastern Suburbs (now known as the Sydney Roosters) competed in their 31st New South Wales Rugby League season in 1938.

Line-up: for the 1938 season included - Jack Arnold, D.Bartlett, F.Bell, Aidan Cairns, Steve Callaghan, John Clarke, Percy Dermond, Dick Dunn, Noel Hollingdale, A.Horsell, J.McCarthy, Ross McKinnon, Andy Norval, Sid 'Joe' Pearce, Henry 'harry' Pierce. Ray Stehr.

== Ladder ==
	Team	Pld	W	D	L	PF	PA	PD	Pts
1	Canterbury-Bankstown	14	12	2	1	276	135	+141	26
2	South Sydney	14	9	1	4	254	245	+109	19
3	Balmain	14	7	1	6	238	176	+62	15
4	Eastern Suburbs	14	6	3	5	228	203	+25	15
5	North Sydney	14	6	0	8	163	220	-57	12
6	Newtown	14	5	1	8	174	228	-54	11
7	Western Suburbs	14	4	1	9	155	265	-110	9
8	St. George	14	3	1	10	159	275	-116	7

== Results ==
- Premiership Round 2, Monday 25 April 1938 -

South Sydney 21 (Felsch, Thompson, Brown Tries; Williams 5, Felsch Goals) defeated Eastern Suburbs 14 played at the Sydney Cricket Ground.

This was Easts 1st defeat since 22 June 1935

Preceded by 1937	Season; 1938	Succeeded by 1939
