= List of Sydney Roosters coaches =

Below is a list of the Sydney Roosters coaches since 1908.

== List of Coaches ==
No.	Name	Nationality	Seasons	Games	Wins	Draws	Losses	Winning percentage	Premiers	Runners-up	Minor premiers	Wooden spoons
—	—	—	1908–1928	—	—	—	—	—	1911, 1912, 1913, 1923	1908, 1928	1912, 1913, 1923, 1928	—
1	George Boddington	Australia	1929	16	4	2	10	25%	—	—	—	—
2	Arthur Halloway	Australia	1930–1931, 1933–1938, 1945, 1947	168	113	9	46	68.2%	1935, 1936, 1937, 1945	1931, 1938	1931, 1935, 1936, 1937, 1945	—
3	Frank Burge	Australia	1932	16	9	0	7	60%	—	—	—	—
4	Ray Stehr	Australia	1939, 1941, 1946, 1949	64	30	1	33	46.8%	—	1941	—	1949
5	Dave Brown	Australia	1940, 1943, 1957–1959	86	40	1	45	45.2%	1940	—	1940	—
6	Joe Pearce	Australia	1942, 1944	32	14	0	18	43.3%	—	1942	—	—
7	Percy Williams	Australia	1948	18	7	2	9	38.9%	—	—	—	—
8	Ernie Norman	Australia	1950–1952	54	22	0	32	40.7%	—	—	—	—
9	Col Donohoe	Australia	1953	20	10	1	9	52.6%	—	—	—	—
10	Ferris Ashton	Australia	1954	18	3	1	14	16.7%	—	—	—	—
11	Frank O'Connor	Australia	1955–1956	36	13	2	21	36.1%	—	—	—	—
12	Dick Dunn	Australia	1960–1963	80	37	2	41	45.5%	—	1960	—	1963
13	Nat Silcock	England	1964	18	2	0	16	11.1%	—	—	—	—
14	Bert Holcroft	English	1965–1966	36	3	1	32	8.3%	—	—	—	1965, 1966
15	Jack Gibson	Australia	1967–1968, 1974–1976	130	89	4	37	70.2%	1974, 1975	—	1974, 1975	—
16	Louis Neumann	South Africa	1969	22	8	1	13	36.4%	—	—	—	—
17	Don Furner	Australia	1970–1972	72	41	2	29	58%	—	1972	—	—
18	Tony Paskins	Australia	1973	22	12	0	10	54.5%	—	—	—	—
19	Arthur Beetson	Australia	1977–1978, 1985–1988, 1994	158	76	8	74	48.7%	—	—	—	—
20	Bob Fulton	Australia	1979–1982	108	60	5	43	57%	—	1980	1980, 1981	—
21	Laurie Freier	Australia	1983–1984	51	19	2	30	37.3%	—	—	—	—
22	Russell Fairfax	Australia	1989–1990	36	11	2	23	30.6%	—	—	—	—
23	Barry Reilly	Australia	1990	2	1	0	1	50%	—	—	—	—
24	Hugh McGahan	New Zealand	1990	6	3	0	3	50%	—	—	—	—
25	Mark Murray	Australia	1991–1994	80	35	3	42	43.8%	—	—	—	—
26	Phil Gould	Australia	1995–1999	134	80	2	52	61.3%	—	—	—	—
27	Graham Murray	Australia	2000–2001	62	33	1	28	54.4%	—	2000	—	—
28	Ricky Stuart	Australia	2002–2006	141	87	1	53	60.3%	2002	2003, 2004	2004	—
29	Chris Anderson	Australia	2007	16	5	0	11	31.3%	—	—	—	—
30	Brad Fittler	Australia	2007–2009	60	25	1	34	43.1%	—	—	—	2009
31	Brian Smith	Australia	2010–2012	80	38	1	41	46.1%	—	2010	—	—
32	Trent Robinson	Australia	2013–present	236	152	0	84	64.4%	2013, 2018, 2019	—	2013, 2014, 2015, 2018	—

== See also ==
- List of current NRL coaches
- List of current NRL Women's coaches
