= 1939 Eastern Suburbs season =

← 1938	1940 →

Eastern Suburbs (now known as the Sydney Roosters) competed in their 32nd New South Wales Rugby League season in 1939.

== Details ==
In the 1939 season Eastern Suburbs line-up contained the following players:- ???(Coach); Jack Arnold, W. Bamford, D. Bartlett, Dave Brown, S. Callaghan, H. 'Nick'Dalton, Percy Dermond, Dick Dunn, Noel Hollingdale, Henry 'Harry' Pierce, Ray Stehr

== Ladder ==
	Team	Pld	W	D	L	PF	PA	PD	Pts
1	Balmain	14	10	2	2	249	115	+134	22
2	St. George	14	10	0	4	268	169	+99	20
3	Canterbury-Bankstown	14	10	0	4	234	155	+79	20
4	South Sydney	14	9	0	5	219	158	+61	18
5	Eastern Suburbs	14	8	0	6	192	184	+8	16
6	Western Suburbs	14	2	2	10	148	213	-65	6
7	North Sydney	14	2	2	10	129	272	-143	6
8	Newtown	14	2	0	12	124	297	-173	4

Preceded by 1938	Season; 1939	Succeeded by 1940
