= Canterbury-Bankstown Bulldogs Hall of Fame =

The Canterbury-Bankstown Bulldogs are a professional rugby league club in the National Rugby League (NRL), the premier rugby league football competition in Australia.

Based in Belmore, a suburb of Sydney, the Bulldogs in 1935 were admitted to the New South Wales Rugby League (NSWRL) competition, a predecessor of the current NRL competition.

The Bulldogs won their first premiership in just their fourth season (1938). At the time it made them the quickest club (barring the founding clubs) to win a premiership after admission to the competition, a record which was only recently beaten in 1999 by the Melbourne Storm. They won a second premiership in 1942 but then had to wait another 38 years before breaking through for a third title in 1980. During the 80s, the Bulldogs were a dominant force in the competition appearing in five Grand Finals, winning four of them. In the 90s they featured in the 1994, 1995 and 1998 Grand Finals, winning in 1995. Their most recent success was in 2004 when they beat the Sydney Roosters 16 – 13. The tryscorers were Hazem El Masri and Matt Utai, and the Clive Churchill Medal winner was Willie Mason.

== Ring of Champions (Hall of Fame) ==
Ring of Champions (2007)
Inductee	Year
Chris Anderson	2007
Ron Bailey	2007
Greg Brentnall	2007
Eddie Burns	2007
Steve Folkes	2007
David Gillespie	2007
John Greaves	2007
Les Johns	2007
Peter Kelly	2007
Roy Kirkaldy	2007
Terry Lamb	2007
Peter Moore	2007
Chris Mortimer	2007
Steve Mortimer	2007
Edgar Newham	2007
George Peponis	2007
Henry Porter	2007
Steve Price	2007
Kevin Ryan	2007
Frank Sponberg	2007

== 70 Year Team of Champions ==
70 Year Team of Champions (2004)
Player	Position
Les Johns	Full back
Chris Anderson	Wing
Ron Bailey	Centre
John Greaves	Centre
Edgar Newham	Wing
Terry Lamb (C)	Five eighth
Steve Mortimer	Half back
Frank Sponberg	Lock
Steve Folkes	Second Row
David Gillespie	Second Row
Kevin Ryan	Prop
George Peponis	Hooker
Eddie Burns	Prop
Peter Kelly	Reserve
Chris Mortimer	Reserve
Greg Brentnall	Reserve
Henry Porter	Reserve
Roy Kirkaldy	Reserve
Steve Price	Reserve
Peter Moore	Administration

== 50th Anniversary Greatest Team Ever ==
50th Anniversary Greatest Team Ever (1985)
Player	Position
Les Johns	Full back
Chris Anderson	Wing
Ron Bailey	Centre
John Greaves	Centre
Edgar Newham	Wing
Garry Hughes	Five eighth
Steve Mortimer (C)	Half back
Frank Sponberg	Lock
Graeme Hughes	Second Row
Bob McCarthy	Second Row
Henry Porter	Prop
George Peponis	Hooker
Eddie Burns	Prop
Chris Mortimer	Reserve
Ron Costello	Reserve

== Footnotes ==
- Woods B (2007). El Magic – The Life of Hazem El Masri. HarperCollins Publishing. ISBN 0-7322-8402-3
- Andrews M (2006). The ABC of Rugby League. ABC Publishing. ISBN 0-7333-1946-7
- Whiticker A & Hudson G (2005). Canterbury Bulldogs – The Encyclopedia of Rugby League Players. Bas Publishing. ISBN 1-920910-50-6
- Whittaker A & Collis I (2004). The History of Rugby League Clubs. ISBN 978-1-74110-470-7
- Lane D (1996). A Family Betrayal – One Man's Super League War – Jarred McCracken. Ironbark Publishing. ISBN 0-330-35839-1
- Chesterton R (1996). Good as Gould – Phil Gould's Stormy Life in Football. Ironbark Publishing. ISBN 0-330-35873-1
- Lester G (1991). The Bulldog Story. Playright Publishing. ISBN 0-646-04447-8
- Whiticker A (1992). The Terry Lamb Story. Gary Allen Publishing. ISBN 1-875169-14-8
- Tasker N (1988). Top-Dog – The Steve Mortimer Story. Century Hutchinson Publishing. ISBN 0-09-169231-8
- Lester G (1985). Berries to Bulldogs. Lester – Townsend Publishing. ISBN 0-949853-06-2
- NRL Official Information Handbook (2001–2007). Season Guide.
- Middleton D (1987–2006). The Official NSWRL, ARL, NRL Yearbook / Annual.
- Christensen EE (1946–1977). NSWRL Yearbook.
- Rugby League Review (2003–2007).
- Big League (1974–2007).
- Rugby League Week (1970–2007).
- The Rugby League News.
