= Roy McCallum =

Roy McCallum may refer to:

- Roy McCallum (rugby league) (1913–1979), Australian rugby league player who played in the 1930s and 1940s
- Roy McCallum (rugby union) (born 1946), former South African rugby union player

== See also ==
- Ray McCallum, American college basketball coach
- Ray McCallum Jr., American basketball player
