= Jim Champion =

Jim Champion may refer to:

- Jim Champion (gridiron football)
- Jim Champion (rugby league)
