= Aiden Cairns =

Australian rugby league footballer

Personal information
- Full name: Aiden Joseph Cairns
- Born: 1917
- Died: 15 January 1992; Brisbane, Queensland

Playing information
- Position: Centre, Wing
Club
Years	Team	Pld	T	G	FG	P
1938–39	Eastern Suburbs	17	8	0	0	24

Aiden Joseph Cairns (1917-1992) was a professional rugby league footballer in the Australian competition, the New South Wales Rugby Football League premiership.

== Playing career ==
A three-quarter, Cairns, played in 17 matches for the Eastern Suburbs in 1938 and 23 for the North Sydney club in 1941,1942 and 1944. In the 1938 season, Cairns was a try scorer in the Eastern Suburbs side that was defeated by Canterbury in that year's premiership final.

== Death ==
He died on 15 January 1992 in Brisbane, Queensland and was cremated at Mt. Thompson Memorial Gardens.

== Sources ==
- The Encyclopedia Of Rugby League; Alan Whiticker & Glen Hudson
