= Don Manson =

Australian rugby league footballer (1918-1993)

Personal information
- Full name: Donald Hugh Manson
- Born: 29 July 1918 Randwick, New South Wales, Australia
- Died: 13 May 1993 (aged 74)

Playing information
- Weight: 14 st 2 lb (90 kg)
- Position: Wing
Club
Years	Team	Pld	T	G	FG	P
1937–39	South Sydney	21	24	0	0
1939–41	Eastern Suburbs	0	0	0	0	0
	Total	21	24	0	0	0
Representative
Years	Team	Pld	T	G	FG	P
1938–38	New South Wales	1	0	0	0	0
- Source: As of 14 May 2020

Donald Manson (29 July 1918-13 May 1993) was a rugby league player who played for South Sydney on the wing from 1937 to 1939.

== Rugby league career ==
He made his debut in round 1 of the 1937 season against University. In his first two matches he scored six tries, the last player to accomplish such a feat till Charlie Staines in 2020. By the start of the 1938 season, he was considered to "be on the up and up". He was the NSWRFL's leading try-scorer for the 1938 season, and that year he appeared for the New South Wales Blues.

During the 1939 season, Manson went on a tour to New Zealand as part of a side coached by Ray Stehr. After his return, South Sydney did not name him in their line-up for either their first, reserves or third side, a decision which was considered surprising by the Daily News. Manson played one further game in the South Sydney reserves, before subsequently leaving the club for Eastern Suburbs at the season's end. Manson retired from the NSWRFL after the 1941 season, and stopped playing league altogether for five years. He has the second best strike rate in the history of the NRL/ARL/NSWRFL, averaging 1.13 tries per game.
