= Kevin Ryan (rugby) =

Australian politician, rugby union footballer, and rugby league footballer and coach

Personal information
- Full name: Kevin James Ryan
- Born: 26 August 1934 (age 90); Ipswich, Queensland

Playing information

Rugby union
- Position: Tighthead Prop
Club
Years	Team	Pld	T	G	FG	P
1954–1959	Brothers
Representative
Years	Team	Pld	T	G	FG	P
1954–59	Queensland
1957–58	Australia	5

Rugby league
- Position: Prop
Club
Years	Team	Pld	T	G	FG	P
1960–66	St. George Dragons	106	19	0	0	57
1967–69	Canterbury-Bankstown	52	5	0	0	15
	Total	158	24	0	0	72
Representative
Years	Team	Pld	T	G	FG	P
1962–66	New South Wales	8	1	0	0	3
1963–66	City NSW	3	0	0	0	0
1964	Australia	2	0	0	0	0

Coaching information
Club
Years	Team	Gms	W	D	L	W%
1967–70	Canterbury-Bankstown	96	51	2	43	53

Kevin James Ryan (born 26 August 1934) is an Australian former state parliamentarian and local mayor, barrister and advocate. In the 1950s and 1960s he was an Australian dual-code rugby international representative and had previously been a Queensland amateur boxing champion in 1958 and 1959, who trialled for the 1960 Olympics.

== Background ==
Raised in the Somerset Region in Linville, Queensland to Irish-Australian Roman Catholic parents, May Helena Ryan and her husband Matthew a bushman and horseman, he learnt the rudiments of boxing as a young boy. He attended boarding school for his high school years at St Joseph's College, Nudgee from 1948 to 1952 where he started to play rugby union.

== Rugby union career ==
After school Ryan played seven seasons with the Brisbane Brothers club from 1953 to 1959. In the Writer interview he refers to a senior player-coach role that he performed in his final two years at the club and he spoke of the loyalty he felt to the club in 1959 when having agreed terms with St George and having achieved his rugby union representative ambitions, he played out the 1959 season with Brothers and helped them win the 1959 Brisbane Club Premiership.

He was selected in the squad for the 1957–58 Australia rugby union tour of Britain, Ireland and France. He made his international representative debut in the 3rd Test match of the tour, that against England national rugby union team at Twickenham on 1 February 1958. Australian were beaten 9–6. Following the tour's end he made four further appearances for the Wallabies in 1958, firstly against a visiting NZ Maori All Blacks side and then in all three Tests against the All Blacks on the Wallabies 1958 tour of New Zealand.

== Rugby league career ==
=== St. George ===
He was a front rower or second row forward with the St. George Dragons in the latter half of their 11-year consecutive premiership winning run from 1956 to 1966. He played 106 games for the club from 1960 to 1966, and played in seven winning grand finals. Ryan took over the 'Hard Man' mantle in the St George forward pack from Billy Wilson. From 1960 to 1962 when Ryan, Wilson and Norm Provan played together the St George forward pack was formidable. Ryan perfected a ball-and-all, one-on-one tackling style. He disdained gang tackling believing it was his individual responsibility to bring his man down hard without help. He would leave the ground each time he tackled, often winding his opponent with his shoulder, then bringing them to ground wrapped up, ball included.

During his footballing career Ryan was nicknamed 'Kandos' after the New South Wales cement producing town due to his on-field toughness.

He was selected in the squad for the 1963 Kangaroos tour of Great Britain and played in four tour matches on the tour. Along with Jim Lisle, Ryan made his international league debut in a tour match in England in 1963 but he did not play in any Tests on the tour. Collectively he and Lisle were Australia's 29th and 30th dual code rugby internationals. He later represented Australia in two domestic Tests against France, making his Test debut in 1964 in the 2nd Test in July 1964 at Lang Park, Brisbane. Ryan is listed on the Australian Players Register as Kangaroo No. 386.

=== Canterbury-Bankstown ===
Ryan left St George at the end of the 1966 season unable to come to terms in negotiations and wanting to coach. In 1967, as captain-coach, he led Canterbury in their 12–11 victory over St George in the preliminary final. He is therefore sometimes credited with bringing an end to the Dragons' premiership run. Certainly he was able to coach against and counter many of their tactics but the game had changed for all in 1967 with the introduction of the four tackle rule and the now maturing Dragons stars like all other teams in the competition, had to deal with a whole new style of game.

He led Canterbury to the 1967 Grand Final against South Sydney and was captain-coach at the club through to the middle of the 1969 season when he retired due to injury. He continued on as coach that year and for the 1970 season. He played 52 games for Canterbury, scoring five tries.

== After football ==
After retiring from football, Ryan became a barrister in 1970, and was an Alderman or Mayor of the City of Hurstville from 1974 to 1979. He was elected as the Labor Party member for Hurstville in the New South Wales Legislative Assembly in 1976, defeating four-term Liberal MP Tom Mead, and serving until 1984. He had previously made an unsuccessful bid for the seat in 1973. Ryan was defeated by Liberal candidate Guy Yeomans at the 1984 election. The result was considered a minor upset as Labor comfortably won the election overall. Ryan's critics within the Labor Party suggested that he had failed to nurse the electorate sufficiently. Ryan contested the 1987 Bankstown by-election as an independent in opposition to the official Labor candidate. He polled 18.6% but was third behind the Labor candidate Doug Shedden. He contested the electorate again as an independent at the 1988 election but was again defeated with 18.7% of the vote.

Ryan was President of the Rugby League Players Association for many years and a sports commentator with the Australian Broadcasting Corporation from 1970 to 1973 where he usually worked alongside Alan Marks commentating on NSWRFL games. As of 2019 he still practises as a barrister at Selborne Chambers in Sydney.

== Accolades ==
In 2000 Ryan was awarded the Australian Sports Medal. In 2004 he was named at prop-forward for the Berries to Bulldogs 70 Year Team of Champions On 1 April 2007 he was inducted into the Bulldogs Ring of Champions.

== Sources ==
- Andrews, Malcolm (2006) The ABC of Rugby League Austn Broadcasting Corpn, Sydney
- Writer, Larry (1995) Never Before, Never Again, Pan MacMillan, Sydney
- Whiticker, Alan & Hudson, Glen (2006) The Encyclopedia of Rugby League Players, Gavin Allen Publishing, Sydney
