= Sel Lisle =

Australian rugby league footballer

Personal information
- Full name: Selwyn Sydney Lisle
- Born: 29 April 1921 Rose Bay, New South Wales, Australia
- Died: 26 March 1999 (aged 77)

Playing information
- Position: Halfback
Club
Years	Team	Pld	T	G	FG	P
1940–47	Eastern Suburbs	73	34	15	0	132
Representative
Years	Team	Pld	T	G	FG	P
1946	New South Wales	1	0	0	0	0
1942	NSW City	1	0	0	0	0

Selwyn Sydney Lisle (29 April 1921 – 26 March 1999) was an Australian rugby league player, a first-grade New South Wales Rugby League premiership winning halfback who played in the 1940s who made a number of New South Wales representative appearances. Lisle played for the Eastern Sububs club from 1940–42 and 1944–47.

== Playing career ==
A halfback, Lisle was a member of Easts' premiership winning sides of the 1940 NSWRFL season. He was the 1941 NSWRFL season's top try scorer with 13 tries (Note: tied with Percy Dermond) and played in the Easts side that finished runner up that year. In 1942, Lisle was a City Firsts Representative. The second world war interrupted his playing career. Lisle enlisted in the Australian Army in 1942, as a gunner. He was discharged in April 1945 and he resumed his playing career at Eastern Suburbs. He played in the Easts team that worth 1945 NSWRFL season's premiership. In 1946 Lisle represented NSW in the interstate series against Queensland. He was selected at Half back in the New South Wales team to play Great Britain on 1 June 1946.

A long-term Clovelly, New South Wales resident, Lisle died on 26 March 1999, age 77.
