= Fred Robinson (rugby league) =

Australian rugby league footballer

Personal information
- Full name: Frederick Robinson
- Born: 4 October 1911
- Died: 9 April 1967 (aged 55)

Playing information
- Position: Halfback
Club
Years	Team	Pld	T	G	FG	P
1933–40	Eastern Suburbs	40	18	16	0	86
- Source: As of 19 March 2019

Fred Robinson was an Australian rugby league footballer who played in the 1930s and 1940s. He played for Eastern Suburbs in the NSWRL competition during the club's second golden era where they won 4 premierships in 6 seasons.

== Playing career ==
Robinson made his first grade debut for Easts against University at Pratten Park in Round 7 1933.

Robinson played sporadically for Easts over the next 3 years and missed out on playing in the club's premiership victories in 1935 and 1936 but was a part of the side which won the premiership in 1937. The 1937 premiership was won without the need to play in a grand final or finals series.

In 1938, Robinson finished as top point scorer and top try scorer for the club. Eastern Suburbs would go on to finish 3rd at the end of the regular season and reached the grand final against Canterbury-Bankstown who were playing in their first decider whilst Easts were going for their 4th premiership in a row.

Robinson played at halfback in the grand final which was played at the Sydney Cricket Ground in front of 20,287 spectators. Eastern Suburbs went into half time trailing 4-3 before falling away in the second half to lose 19–6.

Robinson played on with Easts until the end of 1940. He missed out on playing in the club's 1940 premiership winning victory over Canterbury-Bankstown.
