= Andy Norval =

Australia international rugby league footballer

Personal information
- Full name: Andrew McLaren Norval
- Born: 26 April 1912 Hindmarsh, South Australia, Australia
- Died: 16 May 1999 (aged 87) Epping, New South Wales, Australia

Playing information
- Position: Lock
Club
Years	Team	Pld	T	G	FG	P
	South Newcastle
1934–41	Eastern Suburbs	106	42	1	0	128
	Total	106	42	1	0	128
Representative
Years	Team	Pld	T	G	FG	P
1938–41	New South Wales	8	3	0	0	9
1937–38	Australia	3	3	0	0	9
1937–41	NSW City	4	5	0	0	15

Andrew McLaren Norval (26 April 1912 – 16 May 1999) was an Australian professional rugby league footballer, a national and state representative lock-forward whose club career was with Sydney's Eastern Suburbs club.

== Career ==
Born in South Australia, where, as a youth, he played Australian rules football, Norval began his rugby league career in the Newcastle competition before moving to Sydney where he played 106 matches with the Eastern Suburbs club in the years (1934–41). Norval a lock played an integral role in an Eastern Suburbs sides that swept all before them during that period, winning 4 premierships as well as finishing runners-up on three other occasions.

Norval formed part of Easts' international forward pack alongside Ray Stehr, Harry Pierce and Joe Pearce.

== Representative career ==
Norval played five matches for New South Wales. He was selected on the 1937-38 Kangaroo tour playing in three Tests and twelve touring matches. His international debut was on the wing in the third Test against Great Britain and he played in that position in both Tests on the French leg of the tour. He is listed on the Australian Players Register as Kangaroo No. 215. Norval is to date the only person to have been born in South Australia to play Test match rugby league.

== Accolades ==
Teammate, Dick Dunn, described Norval as the best player he had seen since beginning his first grade career in 1935.

In February 2008, Norval was named in the list of Australia's 100 Greatest Players (1908–2007) which was commissioned by the NRL and ARL to celebrate the code's centenary year in Australia. He has also been selected in Eastern Suburbs "Greatest-ever" team.

In 2010 Norval was named in a South Newcastle team of the century.
