= Jim Duncombe =

Australian rugby league footballer

Personal information
- Full name: James Thomas Duncombe
- Born: 23 December 1906; Lismore, New South Wales, Australia
- Died: 7 October 1996 (aged 89)

Playing information
- Position: Five-eighth
Club
Years	Team	Pld	T	G	FG	P
1938–40	Canterbury-Bankstown	4	1	0	0	3

Jim Duncombe was a rugby league footballer who played in the 1930s and 1940s for Canterbury-Bankstown in the New South Wales Rugby League (NSWRL) competition.

== Rugby league career ==
Duncombe joined Canterbury in 1938 and made two appearances that season. The second being the 1938 NSWRL grand final where Canterbury secured their first premiership defeating Eastern Suburbs in the final with Duncombe scoring his first and only try for the club in the match.

In 1939, Duncombe captained the premiership winning reserve grade team at Canterbury, playing in all games that season. In 1940, Duncombe became coach of the Canterbury reserve grade team playing some matches as captain-coach. Duncombe continued coaching reserve grade in 1941 before retiring from coaching and playing at the end of that season.
