= Bilbrew =

Bilbrew is a surname. Notable people with the surname include:

- A. C. Bilbrew (1891–1972), American poet, musician, composer, playwright, clubwoman, and radio personality
- Gene Bilbrew (1923–1974), African-American poet, musician, composer, playwright, clubwoman, and radio personality
- Kitty Jean Bilbrew or Kitty White (1923–2009), American jazz singer
