= Frank Sponberg =

Australian rugby league footballer

Personal information
- Full name: Francis Anthony Sponberg
- Born: 18 May 1913 Balmain, New South Wales, Australia
- Died: 17 June 2000 (aged 87) Central Coast, New South Wales, Australia

Playing information
- Height: 182 cm (6 ft 0 in)
- Weight: 94 kg (14 st 11 lb)
- Position: Lock, Second-row
Club
Years	Team	Pld	T	G	FG	P
1932–34	Western Suburbs	38	5	0	0	15
1935–44	Canterbury-Bankstown	118	27	2	0	85
	Total	156	32	2	0	100
Representative
Years	Team	Pld	T	G	FG	P
1933–34	New South Wales	3	1	0	0	3
1933–35	NSW City	4	2	0	0	6
- Source: As of 19 February 2019

Francis Anthony Sponberg (18 May 1913 − 17 June 2000) was a professional rugby league footballer who played for Western Suburbs, Canterbury-Bankstown and for the New South Wales Rugby League team. He is the younger brother of Bill Sponberg - who also played for Canterbury.

== Club career ==
Of Swedish descent, Sponberg had a successful club career, winning three grand finals with two different clubs.

A Canterbury junior, Sponberg made his debut for Western Suburbs in Round 6 of the 1932 season. He played for Wests for three seasons between 1932 and 1934. Sponberg played in the final against South Sydney after a semi-final win against Balmain. However, as minor premiers, Souths were allowed right of challenge, and so a rematch of the grand final was played a week later. Western Suburbs lost the grand final 12-19 and Souths took their 11th title. He scored his debut try in round 11 of the 1932 season in a win against Sydney University.

Sponberg played lock in the 1934 Grand Final, with his team defeating Eastern Suburbs 15-12.

He joined the newly admitted Canterbury-Bankstown club for their debut season in 1935. Sponberg was appointed captain of Canterbury-Bankstown's first-grade side on six occasions and was a member of the club's premiership-winning teams in 1938 and 1942. He played eight seasons with Canterbury between 1935 and 1944, including the 1938 Grand Final and the 1942 Grand Final. He spent the 1940 season as captain-coach of Wollongong, before returning to Canterbury in 1941. In round 4 of 1941, Sponberg scored two tries against South Sydney. In Canterbury's season rematch with Souths, Sponberg also scored two tries to help his team win 16-13.

In 1944, Sponberg played his final career game in round 8 against Newtown. He scored a try in that game.

== Representative career ==
Sponberg represented New South Wales on seven occasions between 1933 and 1935. He scored a try in New South Wales' 24-0 Game 1 win against Queensland in the 1933 Interstate series. He missed 1936 selection due to broken ribs. Sponberg also represented New South Wales City, making 4 appearances with the representative team. In his debut with the team, he scored 2 tries against New South Wales Country, with his team winning 47-6.

Sponberg died at his home on the Central Coast of New South Wales following a short illness on 17 June 2000, aged 87.

== Accolades ==
During 1936, Sponberg was quoted in the press as "the next best lock to Wally Prigg in Australia."

In 1985, Sponberg was selected in the Bulldogs' 'Greatest Team Ever'.

In 2004, Sponberg was named in the Canterbury 70th year Berries to Bulldogs Team Of Champions as lock forward.

In 2007, he was inducted into the Bulldogs Ring of Champions (Hall of Fame).
