= Alan Brady =

Australian former RL coach and rugby league footballer

Personal information
- Full name: Alan Joseph Brady
- Born: 14 September 1909 Woollahra, New South Wales
- Died: 28 October 1969 (aged 60) Sydney, New South Wales, Australia

Playing information
- Position: Wing, Centre
Club
Years	Team	Pld	T	G	FG	P
1929–35	Western Suburbs	95	71	0	0	223
1936–40	Canterbury-Bankstown	39	15	0	0	45
	Total	134	86	0	0	268
Representative
Years	Team	Pld	T	G	FG	P
1930–35	New South Wales	8	4	0	0	12
1930–34	NSW City	2	0	0	0	0
1930	Metropolis	1	1	0	0	3

Coaching information
Club
Years	Team	Gms	W	D	L	W%
1940	Canterbury-Bankstown	16	9	0	7	56

Alan Brady (1909–1969) was an Australian professional rugby league footballer who played in the 1920s, 1930s and 1940s. A New South Wales representative three-quarter back, he played in the NSWRFL Premiership for Sydney's the Western Suburbs and Canterbury-Bankstown clubs, with both of whom he won premiership titles.

== Playing career ==
In 1929, his first professional season, Brady was the New South Wales Rugby Football League premiership's top try-scorer with 11 tries. A year later, Brady was the star of the first rugby league grand final ever played in Australia, scoring 3 tries in the match that gave the Magpies their first premiership success. Four years later, he was a member of the club's second grand final win when they defeated the Roosters 15–12. He scored 71 tries in his time with the Magpies, at the time a club record, later eclipsed by Peter Dimond.

Joining the recently formed Canterbury-Bankstown DRLFC in 1936, Brady captain-coached the club to victory in the 1938 NSWRFL season's premiership final, giving him the rare achievement of playing in the first premiership victory for two different clubs.

== Coaching career ==
He was coach of the Canterbury side that lost the 1940 NSWRFL season's premiership final.
