= Jim Norton (rugby league) =

Australian rugby league footballer

Personal information
- Full name: James William Norton
- Born: 2 April 1915
- Died: 7 March 1942 (aged 26)

Playing information
- Position: Fullback
Club
Years	Team	Pld	T	G	FG	P
1938–39	Eastern Suburbs	20	0	23	0	46
- Source: As of 19 March 2019

Jim Norton was an Australian rugby league footballer who played in the 1930s. He played for Eastern Suburbs in the NSWRL competition.

== Background ==
Norton played Group 9 country rugby league for Queanbeyan and Southern Districts before signing with defending premiers Eastern Suburbs in 1938.

== Playing career ==
Norton made his first grade debut for Easts against Newtown at the Sydney Sports Ground in Round 10 1938 with the match finishing in a 17–17 draw. Norton would remain the primary goal kicker for the team throughout the year.

Eastern Suburbs would go on to finish 3rd at the end of the regular season and reached the grand final against Canterbury-Bankstown who were playing in their first decider whilst Easts were going for their 4th premiership in a row.

Norton played at fullback in the grand final which was played at the Sydney Cricket Ground in front of 20,287 spectators. Eastern Suburbs went into half time trailing 4-3 before falling away in the second half to lose 19–6.

Norton played on with Easts the following year but departed the club at the end of the 1939 season.
