= Gordon Clunas =

Australian rugby league footballer

Personal information
- Full name: Gordon Robert Clunas
- Born: 5 January 1916 Canterbury, New South Wales, Australia
- Died: 16 February 1977 (aged 61)

Playing information
- Position: Fullback, Lock
Club
Years	Team	Pld	T	G	FG	P
1940–44	Canterbury-Bankstown	19	0	0	0	0
- Source: As of 16 April 2019

Gordon Clunas was an Australian professional rugby league footballer who played in the 1930s and 1940s. He played for Canterbury-Bankstown in the New South Wales Rugby League (NSWRL) competition.

== Background ==
Clunas played junior rugby league for Campsie.

== Playing career ==
Clunas made his debut for Canterbury against Western Suburbs in 1937 during the City Cup competition. It wasn't until the 1940 season that Clunas made his first grade debut for the club which was against North Sydney. In 1940, Canterbury reached their second grand final against Eastern Suburbs. Clunas played at lock as Canterbury were defeated 24–14 at the Sydney Cricket Ground. The following season, Canterbury finished 2nd in 1941 and reached the final but were once again defeated by Easts 24–22.

In 1942, Clunas made 1 appearance for Canterbury and missed out on the club's second premiership victory over St George. In the following 2 seasons, Canterbury went from winning the premiership in 1942 to running last in 1943 and 1944 claiming the wooden spoon. As of the 2019 season, no other club has gone from premiers to wooden spooners the next season with the exception of Melbourne who won the premiership in 2009 but were later stripped of the title for major breaches of the salary cap in 2010 and made to play for no points which resulted in the club coming last.

Clunas last season in the top grade was in 1944 but continued to play reserve and third grades for the club. In total, Clunas made 92 appearances for Canterbury.

== Post playing ==
Clunas became Canterbury's third grade coach and held the position from 1946 to 1953. Clunas later became chairman of the Canterbury Leagues Club board throughout the 1970s.
