= Doug Bartlett =

Australian rugby league footballer (1914-2001)

Personal information
- Full name: Douglas Bartlett
- Born: 15 October 1914
- Died: 1 December 2001 (aged 87)

Playing information
- Position: Fullback
Club
Years	Team	Pld	T	G	FG	P
1938–42	Eastern Suburbs	39	0	49	0	98
- Source: As of 19 March 2019

Doug Bartlett was an Australian rugby league footballer who played in the 1930s and 1940s. He played for Eastern Suburbs in the NSWRL competition during the club's second golden era where they won 4 premierships in 6 years and 5 premierships in total from 1935 to 1945.

== Playing career ==
Bartlett made his first grade debut for Easts against St George at the Earl Park, Arncliffe in Round 8 1938. This would be his only appearance for the club that year and was not included in the grand final team which lost to Canterbury-Bankstown.

In 1940, Bartlett played at fullback in the 1940 NSWRL grand final against Canterbury-Bankstown. Easts won the match 24–14 at the Sydney Cricket Ground in front of 24,167 spectators exacting revenge on their grand final loss 2 years before. Bartlett kicked 2 goals in the game.

In 1941, Eastern Suburbs reached their 6th grand final in 8 years with the opponents this time being St George. Bartlett played at fullback in the match which was played at the Sydney Cricket Ground. St George led 12–6 at half-time and were never troubled by Eastern Suburbs winning their first premiership by a score of 31–14 in front of 39,957 people.

Bartlett played one final year in 1942 but missed out on playing in the 1942 grand final side which lost to Canterbury.
