= Merv Denton =

Australian rugby league player

Mervyn Denton
Personal information
- Full name: Mervyn John Denton
- Born: 14 February 1920 Sydney, New South Wales, Australia
- Died: 23 June 1980 (aged 60) Villawood, New South Wales, Australia

Playing information
- Position: Wing
Club
Years	Team	Pld	T	G	FG	P
1940	Canterbury-Bankstown	12	6	0	0	18
1943	Balmain	12	5	8	0	31
1945	Canterbury-Bankstown	9	4	0	0	12
	Total	33	15	8	0	61
Representative
Years	Team	Pld	T	G	FG	P
1939–41	New South Wales	12	12	1	0	38
1939–44	NSW Country	4	3	4	0	17
1940–43	NSW City	2	5	2	0	19

Mervyn John Denton (1920–1980) was an Australian rugby league player who played in the 1930s and 1940s. He played in the NSWRFL, as a wing.

== Playing career ==
Denton played for Canterbury-Bankstown in 1940 and 1945 & Balmain in 1943 as club captain. Denton was a member of the Canterbury-Bankstown team that lost the 1940 Premiership Final to Eastern Suburbs.

He also represented New South Wales on 12 occasions between 1939 and 1943.

He also moved to Young, New South Wales as captain-coach and represented NSW Country Firsts 1941-42 and 1944 while playing there. Young won the 1941 Group 9 Premiership during Denton's engagement.

He died at Villawood, New South Wales on 23 June 1980, aged 60.
