= Jim Champion (rugby league) =

Australian rugby league footballer

Personal information
- Full name: Jim Champion
- Born: 27 June 1913 Lithgow, New South Wales, Australia
- Died: 29 June 2003 (aged 90)

Playing information
- Position: Centre
Club
Years	Team	Pld	T	G	FG	P
1938–39	Canterbury-Bankstown	30	6	1	0	20

Jim Champion (1913–2003) was a rugby league footballer who played in the 1930s for Canterbury-Bankstown in the New South Wales Rugby League competition.

== Rugby league career ==
Champion joined Canterbury in 1938 making his debut against North Sydney. Champion played in the premiership winning team that season when Canterbury defeated Eastern Suburbs in the final to claim the club's first premiership.

The following season, Champion was part of the 1939 City Cup winning side scoring twice in the final. After two years at Canterbury, Champion moved back to Lithgow and played in the local competition. Champion died in June 2003.
