= Bob Farrar =

Australian rugby league player

Personal information
- Full name: Robert Farrar
- Born: 29 August 1918
- Died: 12 May 1987 (aged 68)

Playing information
- Position: Second-row
Club
Years	Team	Pld	T	G	FG	P
1940–45	Canterbury-Bankstown	55	10	0	0	30
1946	Eastern Suburbs	14	0	0	0	0
	Total	69	10	0	0	30
Representative
Years	Team	Pld	T	G	FG	P
1939	NSW Country	1	0	0	0	0
1942	NSW City	1	0	0	0	0

Bob Farrar was an Australian rugby league footballer who played for the Canterbury-Bankstown and Eastern Suburbs in the 1940s.

== Playing career ==
Farrar made his first grade debut for Canterbury in 1940 against Western Suburbs.

In Farrar's first season at Canterbury, the club reached the 1940 NSWRL grand final against Eastern Suburbs. Farrar played at second-row as Canterbury were defeated 24-14 by Easts at the Sydney Cricket Ground.

The following season in 1941, Canterbury finished second on the table but were defeated once again by Eastern Suburbs in a tight match 24–22. In 1942, Canterbury-Bankstown finished as minor premiers and reached the grand final against defending premiers St. George. Farrar played for Canterbury in the grand final as they won their second premiership defeating St George 11–9 at a muddy SCG.

In 1946, Farrar joined Eastern Suburbs and played one season for the club before retiring.
