= Roy McCallum (rugby league) =

Australian rugby league footballer

Personal information
- Full name: Roy McCallum
- Born: 17 December 1913; Lakemba, New South Wales, Australia
- Died: 30 June 1979 (aged 65)

Playing information
- Position: Second-row, Prop
Club
Years	Team	Pld	T	G	FG	P
1935–40	Canterbury-Bankstown	53	7	2	0	25

Roy McCallum (1913–1979), nicknamed "Rooster", was a rugby league footballer who played in the 1930s and 1940s for Canterbury-Bankstown in the New South Wales Rugby League (NSWRL) competition.

== Rugby league career ==
McCallum made his debut for Canterbury in the club's inaugural year, making five appearances in a season in which the side only managed to win one match.

In 1938, McCallum played in the NSWRL grand final victory over Eastern Suburbs, which was the first premiership for the club. In 1940, McCallum played for Waratah Mayfield in Newcastle. The following year, McCallum returned to Canterbury. This time he played in reserve grade for the entire season before leaving the club once again.

McCallum returned in 1946 and 1947 in which both times he failed to make the first grade team, playing for the reserve grade team instead before retiring from all forms of the game at the end of 1947. McCallum's younger brothers Reub and Arthur also played for Canterbury. McCallum died in 1979. In 2004, McCallum was nominated for the Berries to Bulldogs 70 Year Team of Champions.
