= Bill Brew =

Australian rugby league footballer

Personal information
- Full name: William George Brew
- Born: 17 October 1918
- Died: 11 July 1941 (aged 22) Sydney, New South Wales, Australia

Playing information
- Position: Centre, Wing
Club
Years	Team	Pld	T	G	FG	P
1940–41	Eastern Suburbs	12	1	1	0	5

William George Brew (17 October 1918 – 11 July 1941) was a rugby league footballer in the Australian competition the New South Wales Rugby League in the years 1940 and 1941.

== Playing career ==
Brew played for the Eastern Suburbs club. A try scorer in the Easts' premiership winning side that defeated Canterbury Bankstown, in 1940. Brew made his 1st grade debut in the previous weeks semi-final against St George, when he was brought into the side as a replacement for the injured Dave Brown.

== Death ==
On 11 July 1941, Brew died in Prince Henry Hospital, Sydney after contracting meningitis, following a match against an ‘invitational’ army side. He was buried at Botany Catholic Cemetery on 12 July 1941.

== See also ==
- Bilbrew
