= Bob Allison (rugby league) =

Australian rugby league footballer

Personal information
- Full name: Robert Allison
- Born: 21 October 1913 Portland, New South Wales, Australia
- Died: 8 November 1997 (aged 84)

Playing information
- Position: Second-row, Lock
Club
Years	Team	Pld	T	G	FG	P
1935–36	Western Suburbs	7	2	0	0	6
1939–45	Canterbury-Bankstown	66	6	0	0	18
	Total	73	8	0	0	24
- Source: As of 16 April 2019

Bob Allison (21 October 1913 – 8 November 1997) was an Australian professional rugby league footballer who played in the 1930s and 1940s. He played for Canterbury-Bankstown and for Western Suburbs in the New South Wales Rugby League (NSWRL) competition.

== Playing career ==
Allison made his first grade debut for Wests against Balmain in Round 6 1935 at the Sydney Cricket Ground. Western Suburbs would go on to reach the finals in 1935 but were defeated by Eastern Suburbs. Allison played one further season with Wests before leaving at the end of 1936.

Due to the residency rules at the time, Allison missed two years of playing before signing with Canterbury in 1939. Allison scored a try on debut for the club against Eastern Suburbs and was a member of their City Cup winning team.

In 1940, Canterbury reached their second grand final against Eastern Suburbs. Allison played at second-row as Canterbury were defeated 24–14 at the Sydney Cricket Ground. The following season, Canterbury finished 2nd in 1941 and reached the final but were once again defeated by Easts 24–22.

In 1942, Allison only made two appearances for Canterbury and missed out on the club's second premiership victory over St George. In the following two seasons, Canterbury went from winning the premiership in 1942 to running last in 1943 and 1944 claiming the wooden spoon. As of the 2019 season, no other club has gone from premiers to wooden spooners the next season with the exception of Melbourne who won the premiership in 2009 but were later stripped of the title for major breaches of the salary cap in 2010 and made to play for no points which resulted in the club coming last.

Allison played up with Canterbury up until the end of 1945 before retiring. His last game for the club was the reserve grade grand final against South Sydney. In total, Allison played 105 games for Canterbury across all grades. In 2004, he was nominated for the Berries to Bulldogs 70 Year Team of Champions.
