= Fred May =

Australian rugby league footballer (1917–1945)

Personal information
- Full name: Frederick Robert May
- Born: 7 September 1917 Sydney, New South Wales, Australia
- Died: 13 March 1945 (aged 27) Territory of New Guinea

Playing information
- Position: Five-eighth
Club
Years	Team	Pld	T	G	FG	P
1940–41	Eastern Suburbs	30	4	1	0	14
- Source: As of 21 March 2019
- Military career
- Allegiance: Australia
- Branch: Australian Army
- Service years: 1941-1945
- Unit: Second Australian Imperial Force
- Conflicts: World War II; Kokoda Track campaign

Frederick Robert May (7 September 1917 – 13 March 1945) was an Australian professional rugby league footballer who played in the New South Wales Rugby League (NSWRL).

== Playing career ==
May played for the Eastern Suburbs club, who are now known by the name of the Sydney Roosters, in the years 1940 and '41. A five-eight, May was a member of East's premiership winning side that defeated Canterbury-Bankstown in the 1940 decider. The following year he was a member of the Eastern Suburbs side that was defeated by St George in the 1941 final.

== Post playing ==
May enlisted in the Australian Imperial Forces (AIF) during World War II, and was killed in New Guinea.

== Sources ==
- The Encyclopedia Of Rugby League Players; Alan Whiticker & Glen Hudson
