= Harry Pierce =

Australia international rugby league footballer

Personal information
- Full name: Henry Theodore Joseph Pierce
- Born: 22 January 1913 Marrickville, New South Wales, Australia
- Died: 12 December 1975 (aged 62) Bondi, New South Wales, Australia

Playing information
- Position: Second-row
Club
Years	Team	Pld	T	G	FG	P
1932–33	St. George	19	1	0	0	3
1934–44	Eastern Suburbs	137	59	0	0	177
	Total	156	60	0	0	180
Representative
Years	Team	Pld	T	G	FG	P
1935–39	New South Wales	7	3	0	0	9
1937–38	Australia	5	1	0	0	0
1937–43	NSW City	4	1	0	0	3

Henry Theodore Pierce (1913-1975) was a professional rugby league footballer who played for the Australia national team and the New South Wales team. He played his club football in the NSWRFL Premiership for Sydney clubs St. George and Eastern Suburbs.

== Playing career ==
Pierce played for the St. George Dragons for two seasons in 1932 and 1933 and for Eastern Suburbs for eleven seasons between 1934 and 1944. He won three straight premierships between 1935 and 1937 with the Tricolours. He won his fourth premiership with the Easts in the 1940 Grand Final. He scored a total of 60 tries during his long and successful club career. The speedy backrower also played in five test matches for Australia in 1937/38. He is listed on the Australian Players Register as Kangaroo No. 216. Pierce also played for City Firsts and New South Wales on six occasions between 1937 and 1943.

While playing football, Pierce also served in the New South Wales Police Force and in 2008, rugby league's centennial year in Australia, he was named as a reserve in a NSW Police team of the century.

== Death ==
He died at Bondi, New South Wales on 12 December 1975, 41 days short of his 63rd birthday.
