= Roy McCarter =

Australian rugby league footballer

Personal information
- Full name: Roy John McCarter
- Born: 5 September 1914; Newcastle, New South Wales, Australia
- Died: 1 November 1999 (aged 85)

Playing information
- Position: Halfback
Club
Years	Team	Pld	T	G	FG	P
1937–44	Canterbury-Bankstown	94	13	96	0	231
Representative
Years	Team	Pld	T	G	FG	P
1942	NSW City	1	1	0	0	3

Roy McCarter was a rugby league footballer who played in the 1930s and 1940s for Canterbury-Bankstown in the New South Wales Rugby League (NSWRL) competition.

== Playing career ==
McCarter began his first grade career with Canterbury in 1937 debuting against St. George. In 1938, McCarter played at halfback in the 1938 NSWRL grand final victory over Eastern Suburbs which was the club's first premiership.

In 1940, McCarter played at halfback in the 1940 NSWRL grand final defeat against Eastern Suburbs. In 1942, McCarter missed out on the 1942 NSWRL grand final victory over St George, picking up an injury against Balmain in the first finals game. McCarter continued playing for another two seasons before retiring. McCarter died on 1 November 1999.
