= Jack Arnold (rugby league) =

Australian rugby league footballer (1919–1997)

Personal information
- Full name: John Bede Arnold
- Born: 30 September 1919 Wilcannia, New South Wales
- Died: 15 October 1997 (aged 78)

Playing information
- Position: Prop, Second-row
Club
Years	Team	Pld	T	G	FG	P
1936	Western Suburbs	4	0	1	0	2
1938–49	Eastern Suburbs	122	23	22	0	113
	Total	126	23	23	0	115
Representative
Years	Team	Pld	T	G	FG	P
1936	NSW City	3	0	1	0	2
- Source: As of 21 March 2019

John Bede Arnold (30 September 1919 – 15 October 1997) was an Australian rugby league footballer who played in the New South Wales Rugby Football League premiership.

== Playing career ==
Arnold played for the Western Suburbs (making his debut in the 1936 season as the second youngest debutant in rugby league history at 16 years of age), and Eastern Suburbs during his career. He had just the one season at Wests before joining Eastern Suburbs in 1938 where he played over 10 seasons, remaining there until his retirement in 1949.

Arnold was a member of the Easts' side that won premierships in 1940 and 1945, he was Also a member of the side that went down to St George in 1941, that club's first premiership.

Arnold, a front-rower, had the reputation of being a hard no-nonsense forward. He was sent-off in Easts' 1941 premiership defeat, But was a try-scorer in Easts' 22-18 premiership victory over Balmain in 1945, sealing the victory with the only points, that day, Dick Dunn didn't score for East's in the match. Arnold was one of 4 captains Easts' were to use during the 1948 season.

== Personal life and death ==
Outside of rugby league Arnold was a member of the local fire brigade. He died on 15 October 1997, at the age of 78.

== Sources ==
- The Encyclopedia of Rugby League Players, Alan Whiticker & Glen Hudson
- The NSW Rugby League Finals, Steve Haddan
