= Edgar Newham =

Australia international rugby league footballer

Personal information
- Full name: Edgar Wynton Newham
- Born: 19 July 1914 Cowra, New South Wales, Australia
- Died: 27 November 1995 (aged 81) Sydney, New South Wales, Australia

Playing information
- Position: Wing
Club
Years	Team	Pld	T	G	FG	P
1938–48	Canterbury-Bankstown	72	55	0	0	175
Representative
Years	Team	Pld	T	G	FG	P
1946	Australia	2	0	0	0	0
1941	New South Wales	5	4	0	0	12
1940–41	NSW City	2	2	0	0	6

Edgar Wynton Newham (1914–1995) was a rugby league footballer for Canterbury-Bankstown, New South Wales and for the Australian national side.

== Rugby league career ==
Edgar Newham played his first game of Rugby League at 19 years of age. By the time he was 24, Edgar Newham joined Canterbury-Bankstown from Cowra, New South Wales and played 9 seasons with the club between 1938-1945 and 1948.

He found immediate success when Canterbury won their first premiership, beating Eastern Suburbs Roosters 19–6 in the 1938 Final. Newham played on the wing in the Final.

Four years later in 1942, Newham crossed for 5 tries in a mid-week match against the Balmain Tigers that decided the minor-premiership. His five try record in this game was only equaled in 2002 by Nigel Vagana. Canterbury won the match 26-20 and went on to win the 1942 Premiership, beating the St. George Dragons 11–9 in the grand final.

The war years interrupted his Canterbury-Bankstown career. In 1946 he returned to Captain-Coach the Cowra league team and in 1947 he played in Queensland.

In 1948, Newham briefly returned to Canterbury as a 34-year-old. He played half of the season with Canterbury before a hip injury forced him to retire as a player.

== War service ==
Newham joined the RAAF as a paratrooper and traveled to club games during the 1942 season while stationed in Newcastle before leaving for active duty overseas, as a gunner. After returning to Australia, he was again playing for Cowra in 1946 when he was again selected to play for the New South Wales rugby league team and ultimately went on to play Great Britain in the 1946 Ashes series.

== Representative career ==
Newham represented New South Wales in 1941 but had to wait until after the War to represent Australia. When he was selected for the Kangaroos at 32 years of age, he became the oldest ever player to make his Test debut. He played two Tests for the Australian national side in 1946.

== Accolades ==
Edgar Newham is recognised as Bulldogs player No. 58.

In 2004 Edgard Newham was named on the wing for the Berries to Bulldogs 70 year Team of Champions.

In 2007 he was inducted into the Bulldogs Hall of Fame (Ring of Champions).
