= Stan Callaghan =

Australian rugby league footballer

Personal information
- Full name: Horace Stanley Callaghan
- Born: 25 December 1916 Kurri Kurri, New South Wales, Australia
- Died: 9 January 1989 (aged 72) Sydney, New South Wales, Australia

Playing information
- Position: Centre
Club
Years	Team	Pld	T	G	FG	P
1937–41	Eastern Suburbs	45	3	0	0	9
- Source: As of 26 June 2019

Horace Stanley Callaghan (25 December 1916 – 9 January 1989) was an Australian rugby league footballer who played in the 1930s and 1940s. He played for Eastern Suburbs in the NSWRL competition during their second golden era where the club won 4 premierships in 6 seasons.

== Playing career ==
Callaghan made his first grade debut for Eastern Suburbs against University in Round 5 1937 at the Sydney Cricket Ground scoring a try in a 52–5 victory.

Callaghan went on to win a premiership in his first season at the club as they finished first on the table but were not required to play in a grand final to be declared premiers.

The following year, Eastern Suburbs reached the grand final against Canterbury-Bankstown looking to win their 4th premiership in a row. Easts trailed 4–3 at halftime before being outclassed by Canterbury in the second half to lose 19–6.

In 1940, Easts finished as minor premiers and reached the grand final against Canterbury-Bankstown. Eastern Suburbs would get their revenge in the final winning 24–14 at the Sydney Cricket Ground in front of 24,167 spectators to claim their 8th premiership.

The following year, Eastern Suburbs reached another grand final with the opponents this time being St George. Callaghan was not selected to play in the match as St George won their first premiership by a score of 31–14. Callaghan retired following the conclusion of the 1941 season.
