= John Clarke (rugby league) =

Australian rugby league footballer (1913–1973)

Personal information
- Full name: John Clarke
- Born: 2 January 1913
- Died: 4 September 1973 (aged 60)

Playing information
- Position: Second-row, Hooker, Prop
Club
Years	Team	Pld	T	G	FG	P
1932–42	Eastern Suburbs	68	4	0	0	12

John Clarke (2 January 1913 – 4 September 1973) was an Australian professional rugby league footballer who played in the New South Wales Rugby League (NSWRL) competition during the 1930s and 1940s.

== Playing career ==
Clarke played 9 seasons and 68 matches for the Eastern Suburbs club in the years (1932–36, 1938 and 1940–42) seasons. A forward, Clarke was a member of Eastern Suburbs side that defeated Canterbury-Bankstown in the 1940 premiership decider.

== Death ==
Clarke died on 4 September 1973, at the age of 60.
