= Percy Dermond =

Australian rugby league footballer

Personal information
- Full name: Percy Dermond
- Born: 31 December 1918
- Died: 16 April 2012 (aged 93)

Playing information
- Position: Wing
Club
Years	Team	Pld	T	G	FG	P
1938–47	Eastern Suburbs	43	43	0	0	129

Percy Dermond (December 31, 1918 – April 16, 2012) was a rugby league footballer in Australia's premier competition the New South Wales Rugby Football League (NSWRFL).

== Playing career ==
A Winger, Dermond played for the Eastern Suburbs club in the years (1938–39), (1941–43) and (1946–47). In the 1941 Season Dermond, with a total of 13 tries for that year, was one, of three players, to be that season's leading try scorer.

Dermond played in two premierships deciders for Eastern Suburbs club. However, they lost both matches. In 1938 they were defeated by Canterbury-Bankstown in their maiden premiership victory and in 1941 they were defeated by St George, it was also their first premiership victory.

The winger played a total of 43 matches for the club, scoring a total of 43 tries and is officially recognised as the club's 259th player.
