= Joe Pearce (Australian rugby league) =

Australian RL coach and former Australia international rugby league footballer

- Pearce in 1932

Personal information
- Full name: Sidney Henry William Pearce
- Born: 7 September 1910 Woollahra, New South Wales
- Died: 16 October 1995 (aged 85) Double Bay, New South Wales

Playing information
- Weight: 15 st 0 lb (95 kg)
- Position: Second-row
Club
Years	Team	Pld	T	G	FG	P
1929–42	Eastern Suburbs	147	34	14	0	130
Representative
Years	Team	Pld	T	G	FG	P
1930–41	New South Wales	32	6	10	0	38
1932–37	Australia	13	1	1	0	5
1930–41	NSW City	12	5	5	0	25

Coaching information
Club
Years	Team	Gms	W	D	L	W%
1942	Eastern Suburbs	7	2	0	5	29
1944	Eastern Suburbs	7	2	0	5	29
	Total	14	4	0	10	29
- Father: Sandy Pearce

Sid 'Joe' Pearce (7 September 1910 – 16 October 1995) was an Australian rugby league footballer who played in the 1930s and 1940s. An Australian international and New South Wales representative second-row forward, he played his club football for Eastern Suburbs with whom he won the New South Wales Rugby League premiership in 1935, 1936, 1937 and 1940. Son of fellow Australian Rugby League Hall of Famer, Sandy Pearce, he is considered one of the nation's finest footballers of the 20th century.

== Club career ==
He was a junior Australian Rules footballer in Sydney's eastern suburbs district but switched to rugby league and first appeared as a full-back for the Tricolours in 1929 before moving into the forwards.

Pearce was an outstanding ball-playing second-rower in the champion Easts' side that saw premiership success in seasons 1935, 1936 and 1937. He had captained the club in 1933 and saw further premiership success with them in 1940.

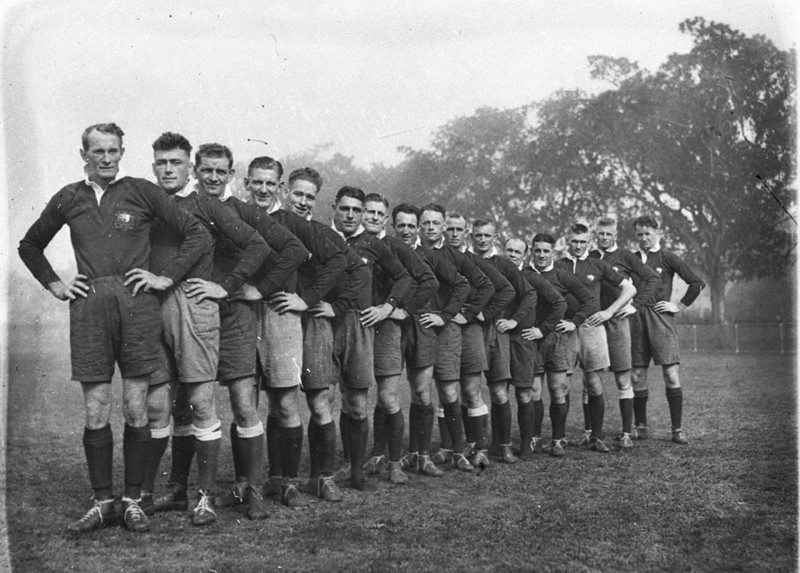
Pearce fourth from left, Kangaroos 1st Test 6 June 1932

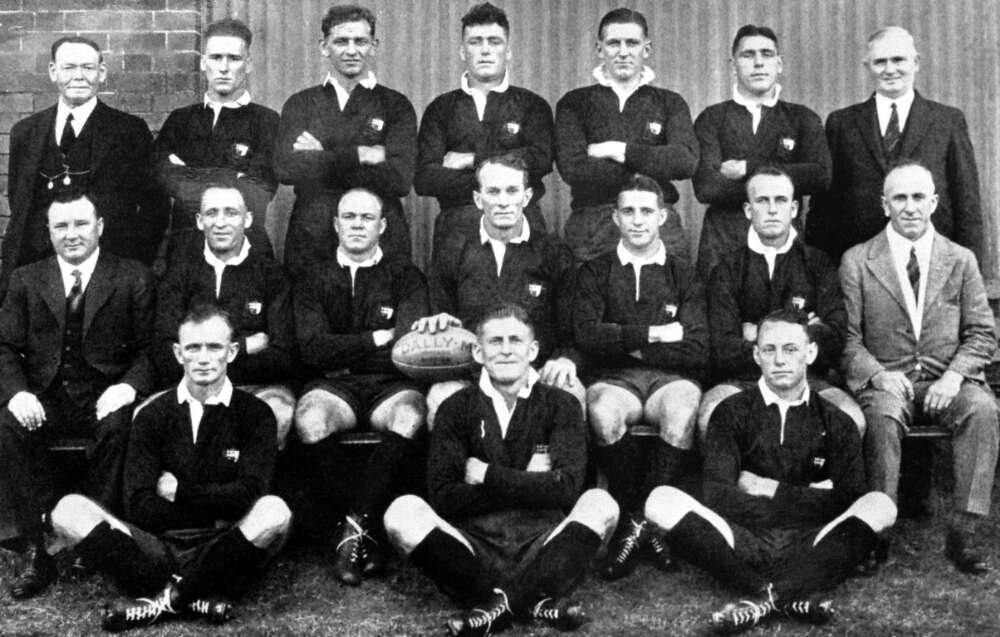
Run-on Test side plus mgrs 6 June 1932, Pearce standing 3rd from right

== Representative career ==
He first represented for New South Wales in 1930 and for the next twelve seasons without fail he played in the interstate series. He debuted for Australia against the touring Great Britain side in 1932. He played in all three Tests of that tour and whilst not a kicker at Easts, booted a conversion in the second Test filling in for Eric Weissel.

He was selected on the 1933–34 Kangaroo tour of Great Britain led by Frank McMillan and played in 2 Tests and 22 minor matches. He was picked for a second Kangaroo Tour in 1937, played in two matches on the first stanza of the tour to New Zealand where he suffered a broken leg. He did not appear in any further matches of the tour nor again represent for Australia. Pearce appeared for Australia in thirteen Test matches.

Pearce is listed on the Australian Players Register as Kangaroo No. 170.

== Father and son ==
Like his father Sandy, Joe played in over 150 matches for the Eastern Suburbs club. They were the first father and son to represent Australia in rugby league. Both players' representative careers were ended by a broken-leg suffered on a Kangaroo tour.

Pearce came from a family of sporting champions. His grandfather Harry, brother Cecil, cousin Bobby and aunt Lilly were renowned scullers (Harry a world champion, Cecil an Olympian and Bobby a dual Olympic gold medalist). His uncle Walter was an outstanding long distance cyclist.

== Post-playing ==
Pearce coached Eastern Suburbs in first grade in the 1944 NSWRFL season. During and after his football days he was competitive sailor on Sydney Harbour in the fast 18-foot class.

He is recognised as Eastern Suburbs player No. 193.

== Accolades ==
Pearce was in 2007 named a member of Easts' greatest ever side – their 'Team of the Century'. In February 2008, Pearce was named in the list of Australia's 100 Greatest Players (1908–2007) which was commissioned by the NRL and ARL to celebrate the code's centenary year in Australia. In 2007 he was inducted into the Australian Rugby League Hall of Fame.
