= Noel Hollingdale =

Australian rugby league footballer

Personal information
- Full name: Herbert Noel Hollingdale
- Born: 1911
- Died: 20 January 2000 (aged 88–89)

Playing information
- Position: Hooker
Club
Years	Team	Pld	T	G	FG	P
1938–42	Eastern Suburbs	53	4	0	0	12
- Source: As of 21 March 2019

Herbert Noel Hollingdale (1911 - 2000) was an Australian professional rugby league footballer who played in the New South Wales Rugby League competition.

== Playing career ==
Hollingdale played for the Eastern Suburbs club in the years 1938–42. A Hooker, Hollingdale played in 53 matches for the club. In 1940 he was a member of Easts' premiership winning team that defeated Canterbury Bankstown 24–14. He also played in two other premiership deciding matches, he was in the side that went down to Canterbury in 1938 - giving that club its first premiership. And in 1941 he was a member of the Easts' side that was defeated by St George in that year's decider, coincidentally it was also that club's first premiership.

Hollingdale died on 20 January 2000, age 88.

== Sources ==
- Whiticker, Alan; Hudson, Glen (2000). The Encyclopedia of Rugby League Players. Wetherill Park, New South Wales: Gary Allen Pty Ltd. p. 609. ISBN 978-1-877082-93-1.
- Rugby League yearbook: Middleton
