= Dick Dunn (rugby league) =

Australian rugby league footballer and coach (1920–2006)

Personal information
- Full name: Richard Alfred Dunn
- Born: 10 August 1920 Woollahra, New South Wales, Australia
- Died: 11 July 2006 (aged 85)

Playing information
- Position: Centre
Club
Years	Team	Pld	T	G	FG	P
1938–47	Eastern Suburbs	148	31	157	0	407

Coaching information
Club
Years	Team	Gms	W	D	L	W%
1960–63	Eastern Suburbs	80	37	2	41	46
Representative
Years	Team	Gms	W	D	L	W%
1961	New South Wales	4	2	0	2	50
- Source: As of 2 April 2021

Richard Alfred Dunn OAM (1920–2006) was an Australian rugby league footballer and coach in the New South Wales Rugby Football League premiership (NSWRFL). He spent nine years with the Eastern Suburbs.

== Biography ==
Dunn was part of the Eastern Suburbs' youth club and carried kit bags for older players like Dave Brown and Ray Stehr, who he idolised. He played 148 matches for the senior club from 1938 to 1947. He spent most of his career in the centres though in later years he moved to lock. He played in four premiership deciders in his career, winning in 1940 and 1945. In the 1945 Grand Final, he scored 19 of East's 22 points, a longstanding club record for the most points scored in a premiership decider.

After retiring from active play, he worked as a sport administrator, serving as vice president of the NSWRL and chairman of rugby league's judiciary panel. He was one of the original Eastern Suburbs directors who negotiated the site of the present club, which had started when Dunn was the social secretary in the 1950s. He coached the New South Wales team in the 1960s, as well as the Easts in 1960, losing to St George in that year's Grand Final. He was made a life member of the Eastern Suburbs, the NSWRL and Australian Rugby League (ARL) and was a recipient of an Order of Australia for his services to rugby league.

Dunn was a sergeant in the Australian Imperial Force stationed firstly at Scheyville as a searchlights operator and later in the Transport Corps near Newcastle. In his civilian life, he worked as manager of the Morley Johnson's store opposite Sydney Town Hall from age 16 and met his wife Margaret there. When the store closed in the 1960s, he worked for Miles Furniture before retiring at age 65. Margaret died in 1990 and Dunn died in 2006 at age 86.
