= 1981 NSWRFL season =

Rugby league competition

1981 New South Wales Rugby Football League
- Teams: 12
- Premiers: Parramatta (1st title)
- Minor premiers: Eastern Suburbs (15th title)
- Matches played: 138
- Points scored: 4,160
- Attendance: 1,312,977
- Top points scorer(s): Steve Rogers (194)
- Wooden spoon: Balmain (3rd spoon)
- Rothmans Medal: Kevin Hastings
- Top try-scorer(s): Terry Fahey (16)

The 1981 New South Wales Rugby Football League premiership was the 74th season of Sydney's professional rugby league football competition, Australia's first. Twelve clubs, including six of 1908's foundation teams and another six from around Sydney competed for the J J Giltinan Shield and Wills Cup during the season, which culminated in a grand final between the Parramatta and Newtown clubs. NSWRFL clubs also competed in the 1981 Tooth Cup and players from NSWRFL clubs were selected to represent the New South Wales team.

== Season summary ==
In 1981 the "sin-bin" was introduced to rugby league in Australia, enabling referees to send players from the field for five or ten minute periods for minor or deliberate technical offences. Newtown hooker Barry Jensen became the first player to be sent from the field in this manner.

Midway through the season, players contracted to NSWRFL clubs were selected to represent the New South Wales team in two games against the Queensland team in 1981. After that the experimental 1981 State of Origin game was played, and for the second time in history NSWRFL clubs' players were able to represent Queensland.

Twenty-two regular season rounds were played from March until August, resulting in a top five of Easts, Newtown, Parramatta, Cronulla and Manly who battled it out in the finals.

Eastern Suburbs' halfback Kevin Hastings won the 1981 season's Rothmans Medal as well as Rugby League Week's Player of the Year award. The Dally M Award went to Cronulla-Sutherland centre, Steve Rogers.

=== Teams ===
This was to be the final year that the NSWRFL premiership was an all-Sydney competition, with the introduction of teams from Canberra and Illawarra in 1982 starting a new era of expansion which would see the League transform into a national, then international competition.

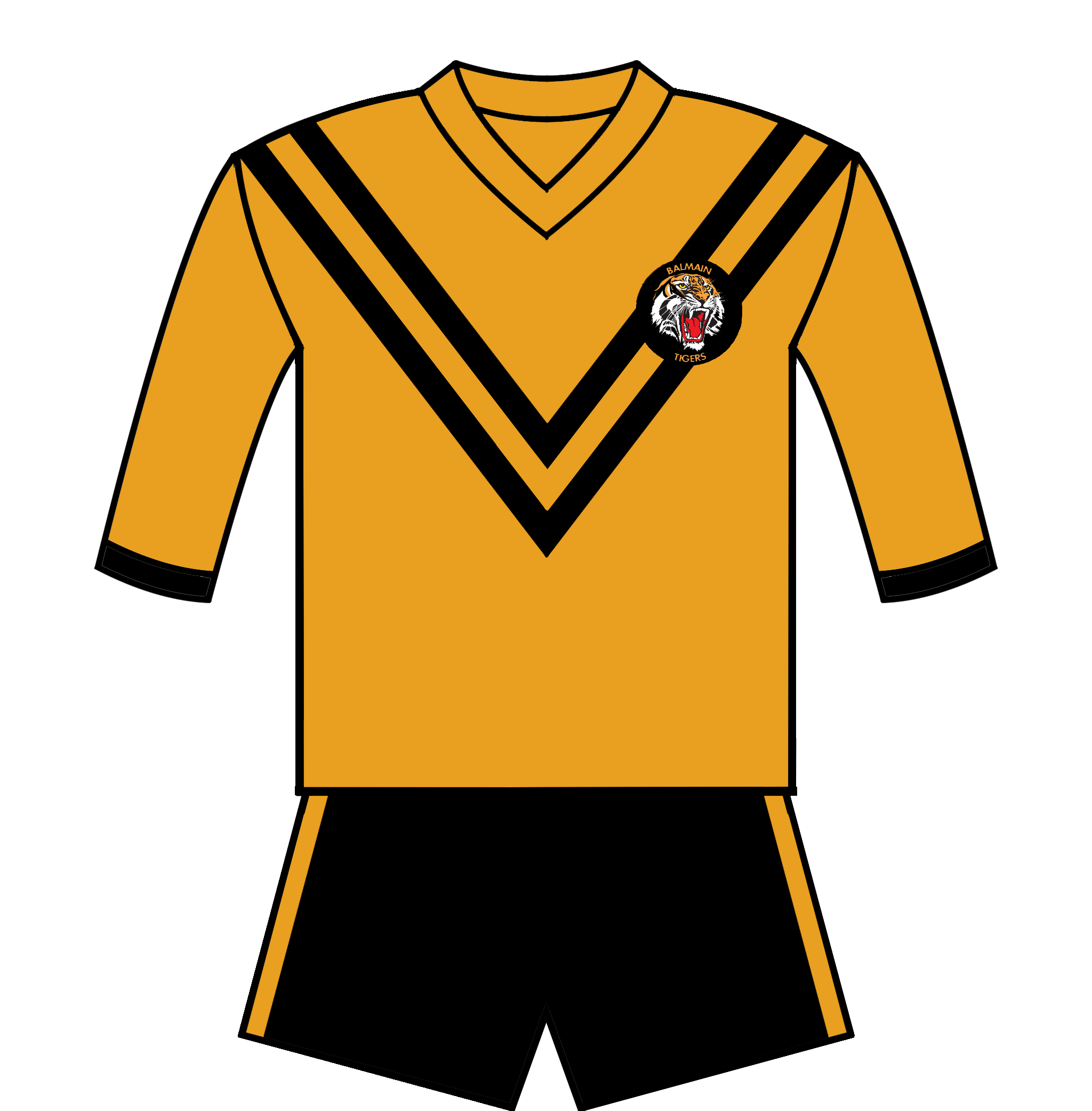
Balmain 74th season Ground: Leichhardt Oval; Coach: Frank Stanton; Captain: Allan McMahon→Neil Whittaker

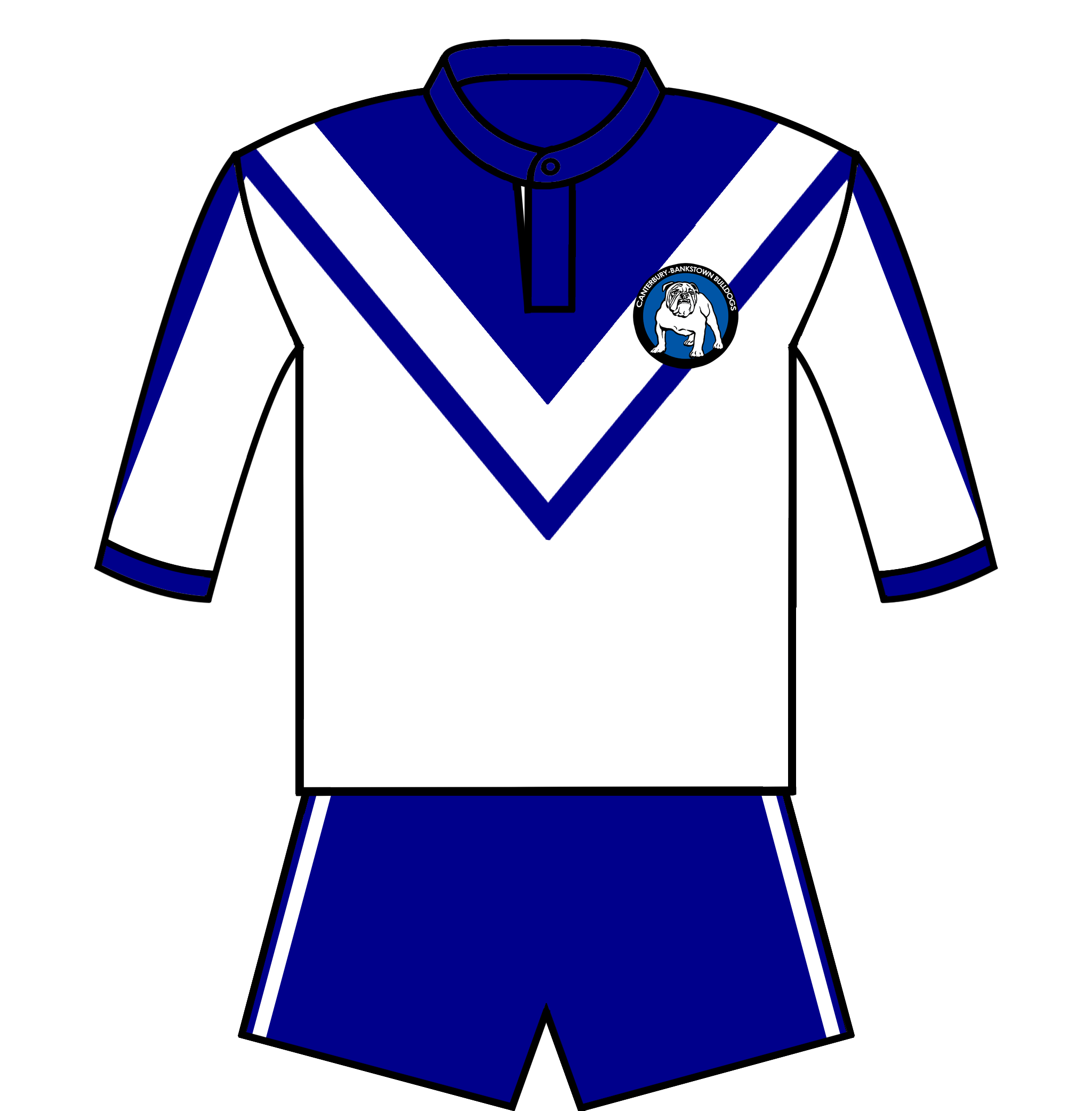
Canterbury 47th season Ground: Belmore Oval; Coach: Ted Glossop; Captain: Mark Hughes & Garry Hughes

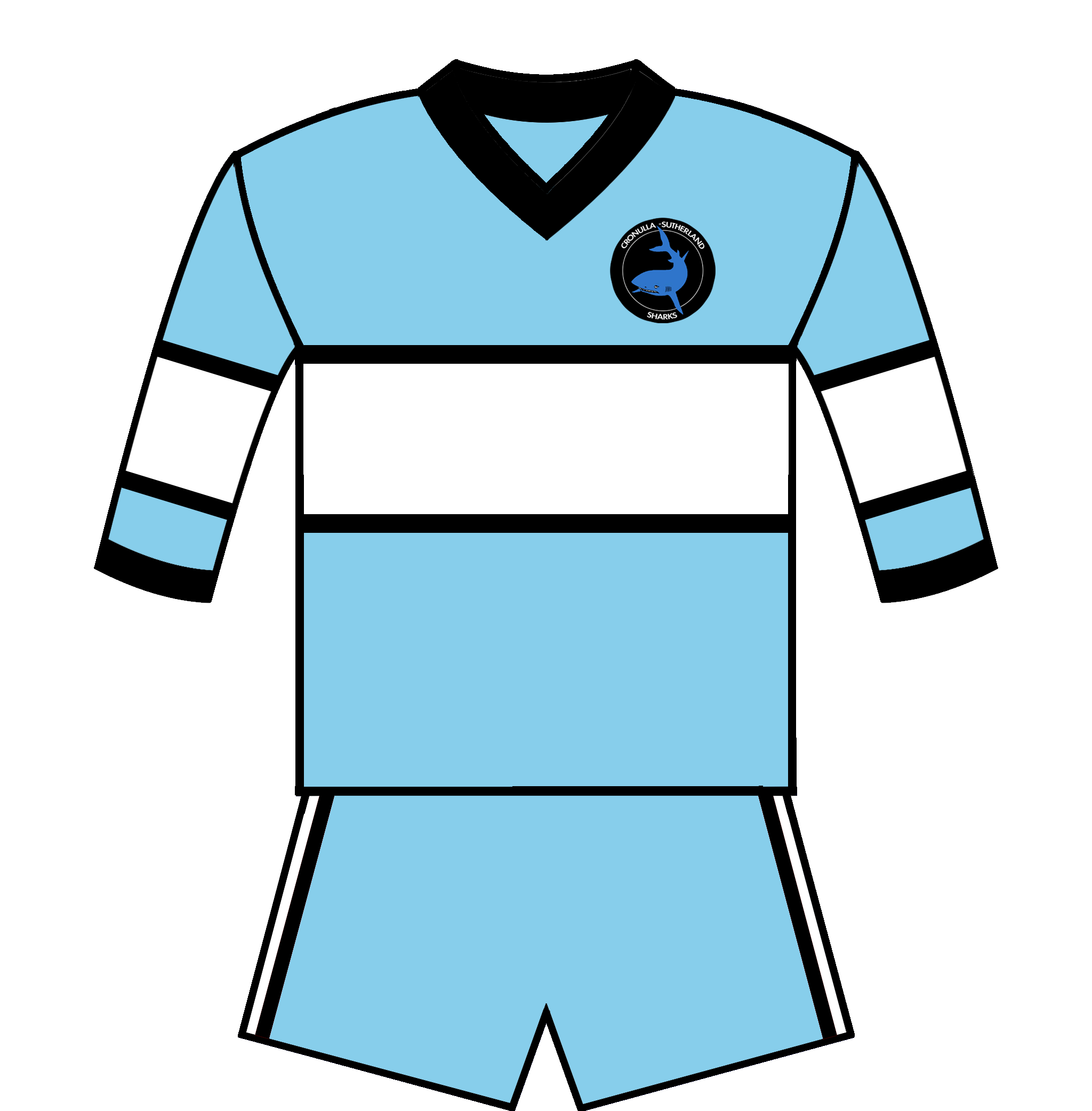
Cronulla 15th season Ground: Endeavour Field; Coach: Greg Pierce; Captain: Steve Rogers

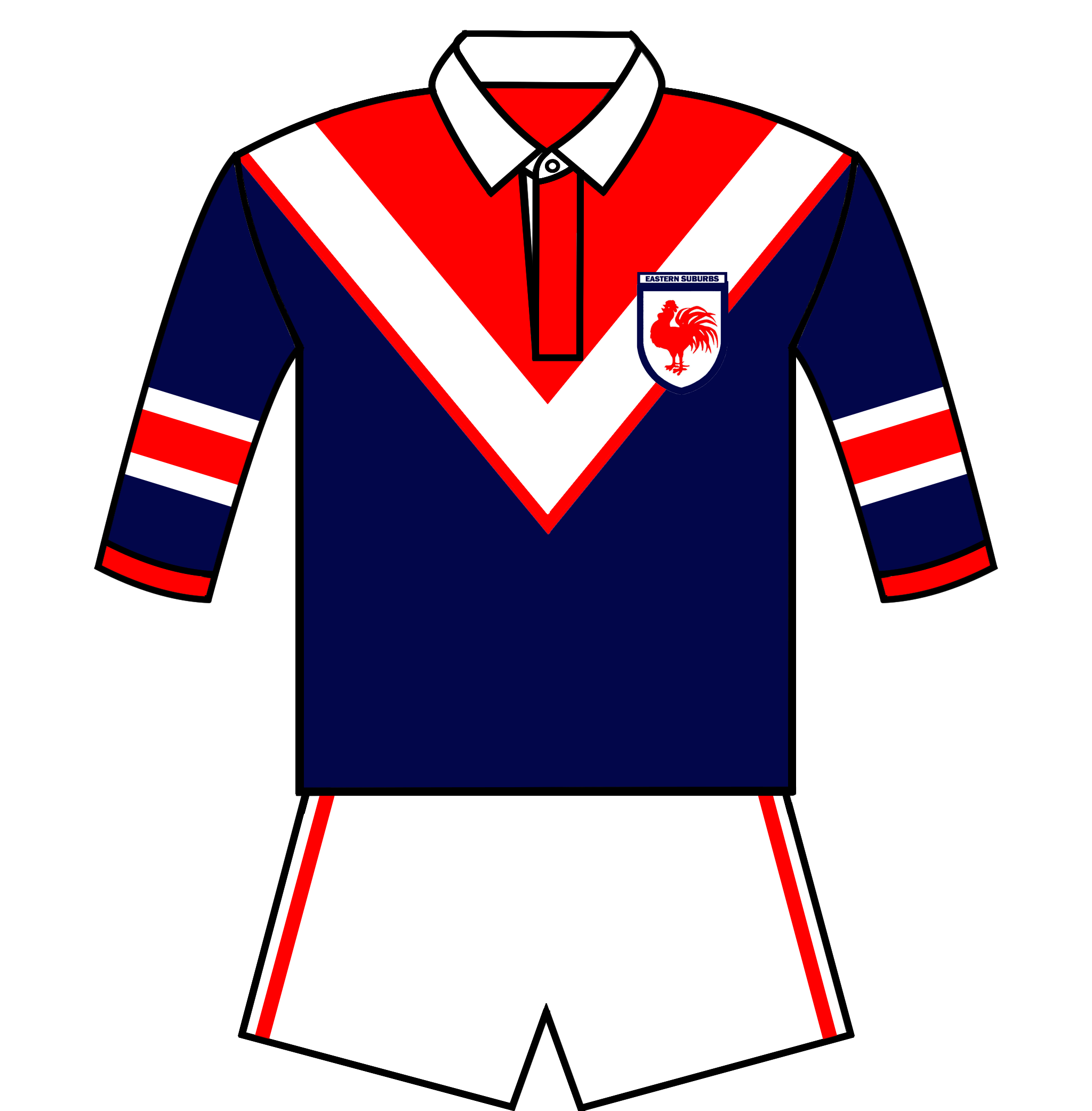
Eastern Suburbs 74th season Ground: Sydney Sports Ground; Coach: Bob Fulton; Captain: Royce Ayliffe

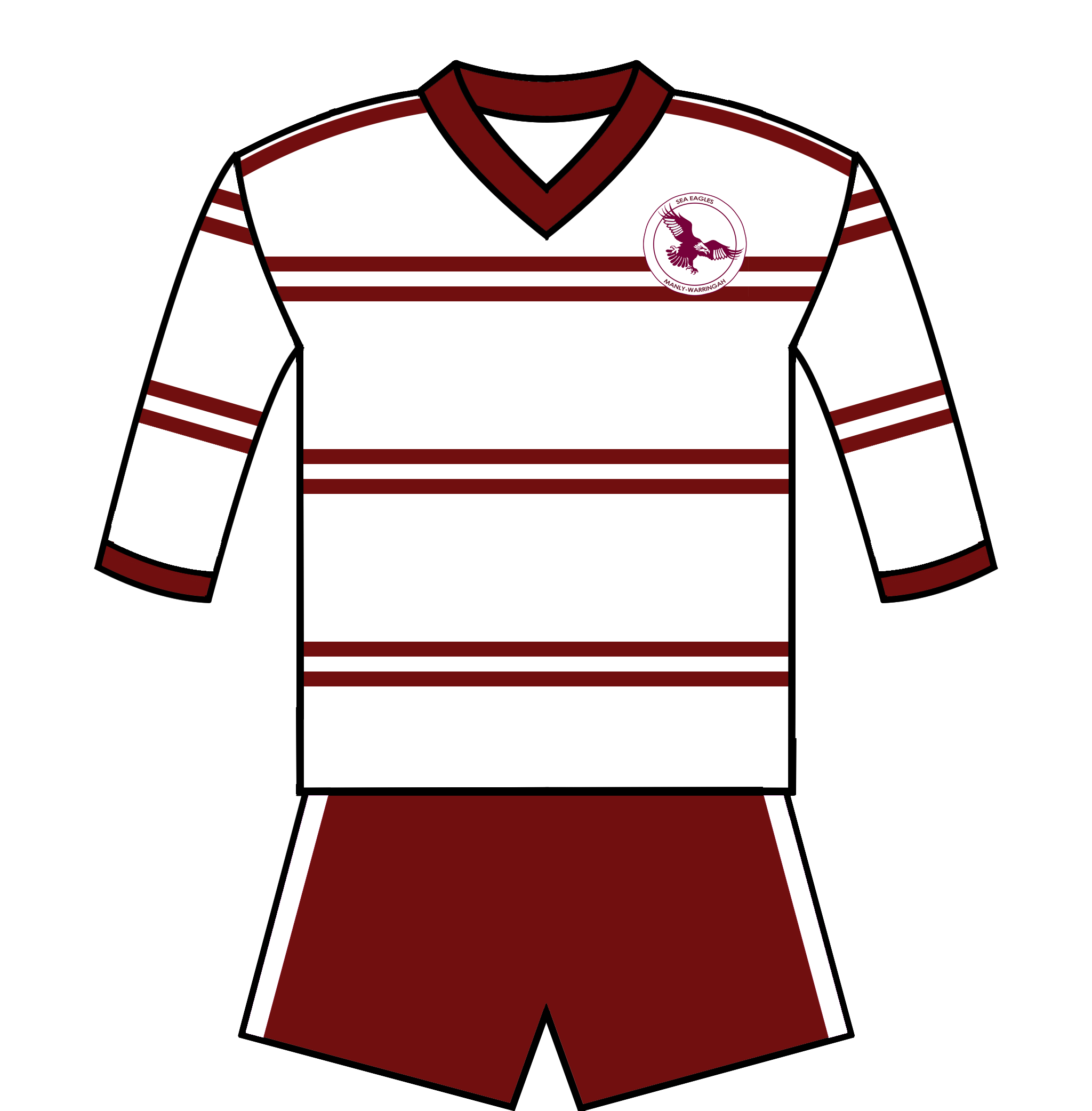
Manly 35th season Ground: Brookvale Oval; Coach: Ray Ritchie; Captain: Max Krilich

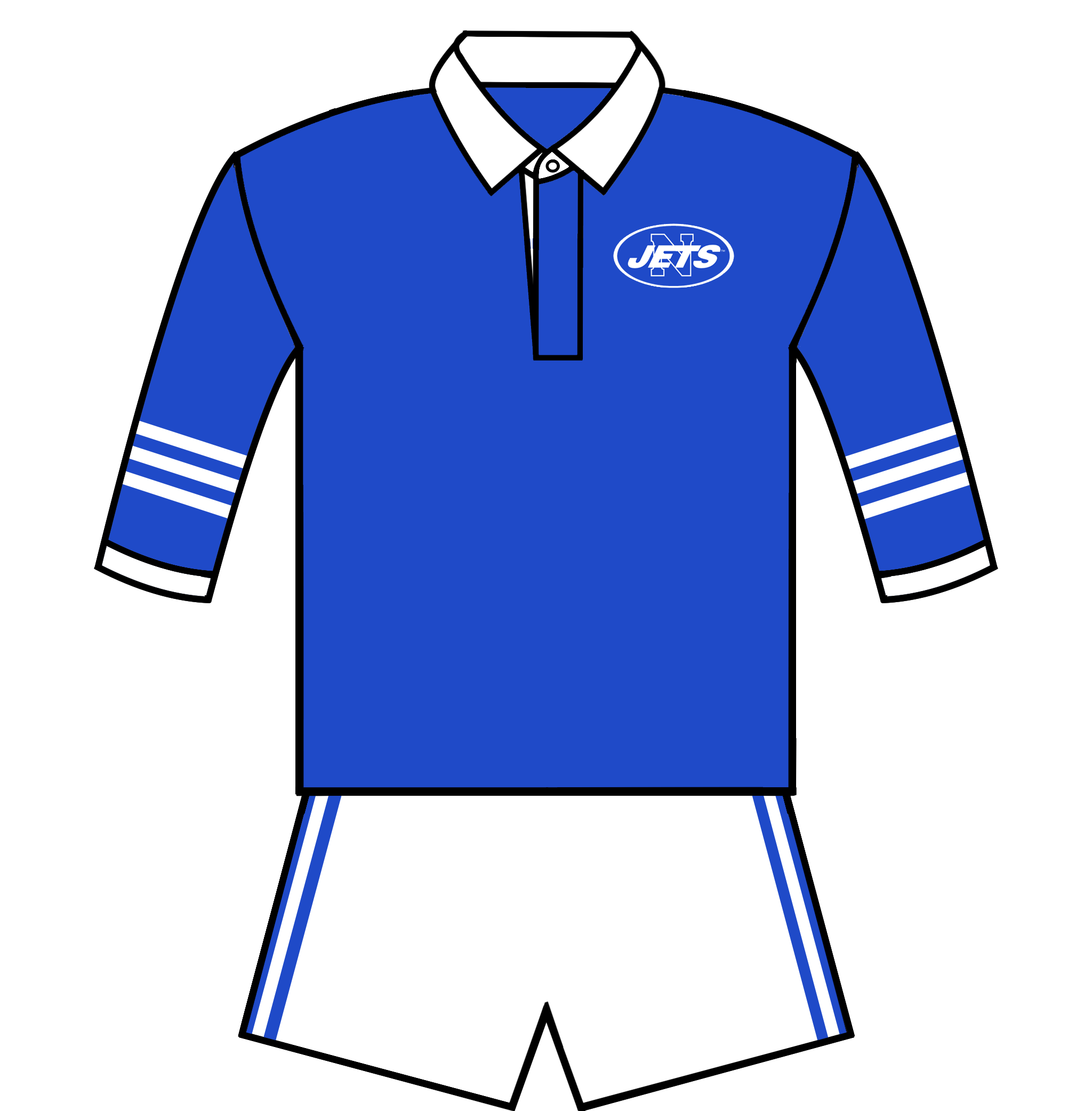
Newtown 74th season Ground: Henson Park; Coach: Warren Ryan; Captain: Tommy Raudonikis

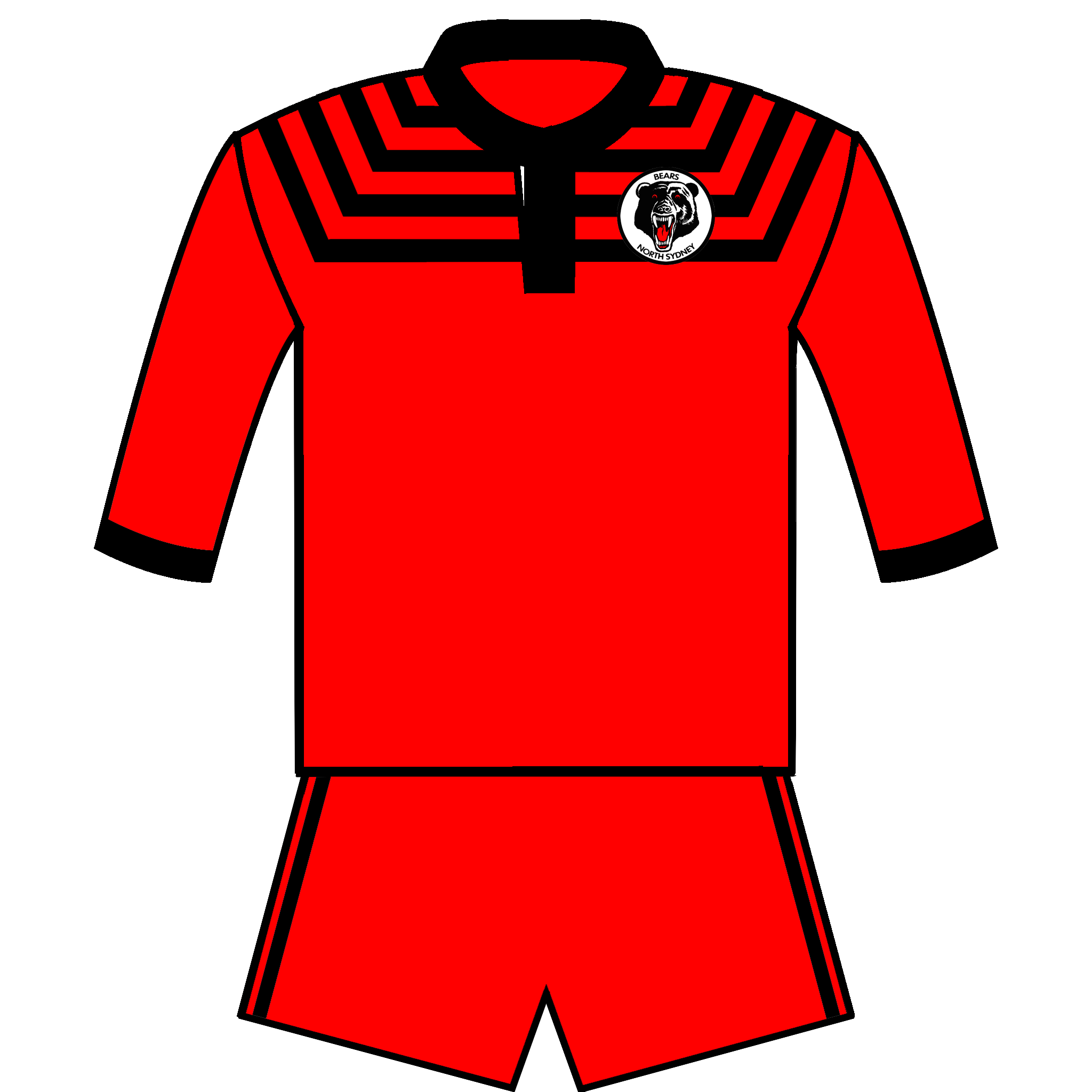
North Sydney 74th season Ground:North Sydney Oval; Coach: Ron Willey; Captain: Mark Graham

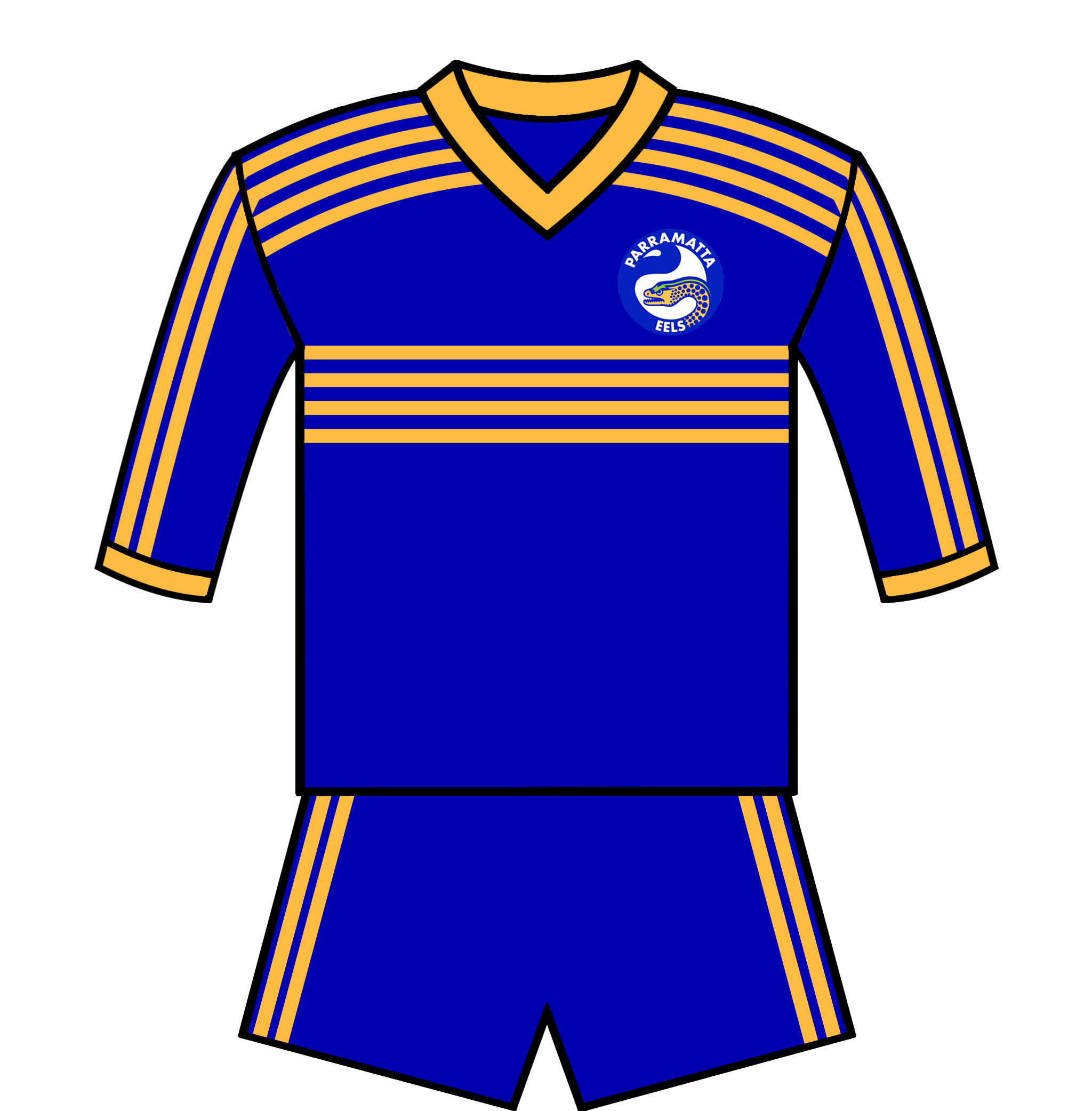
Parramatta 35th season Ground: Cumberland Oval; Coach: Jack Gibson; Captain: Steve Edge

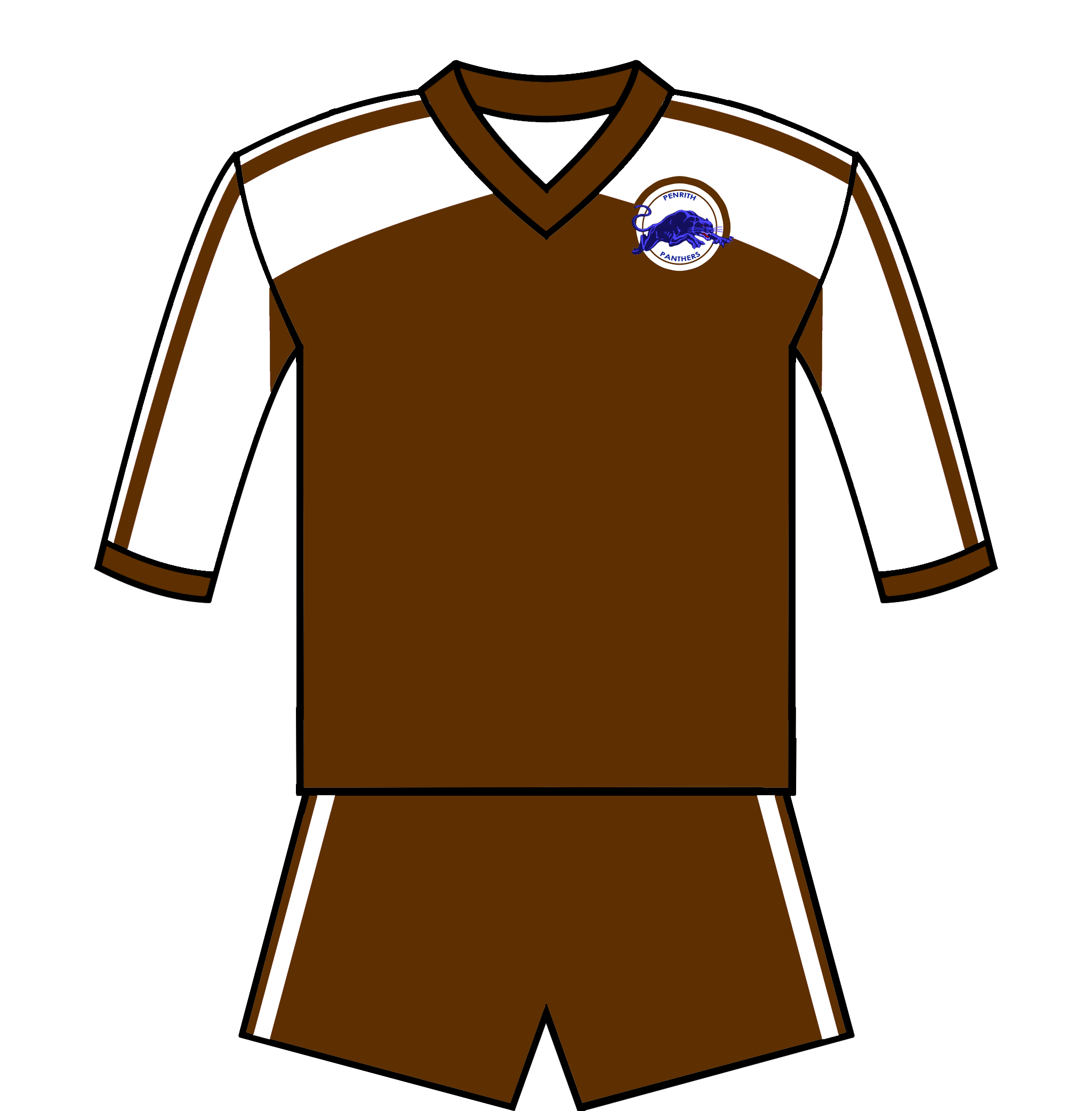
Penrith 15th season Ground: Penrith Park; Coach: Len Stacker; Captain: Tim Sheens

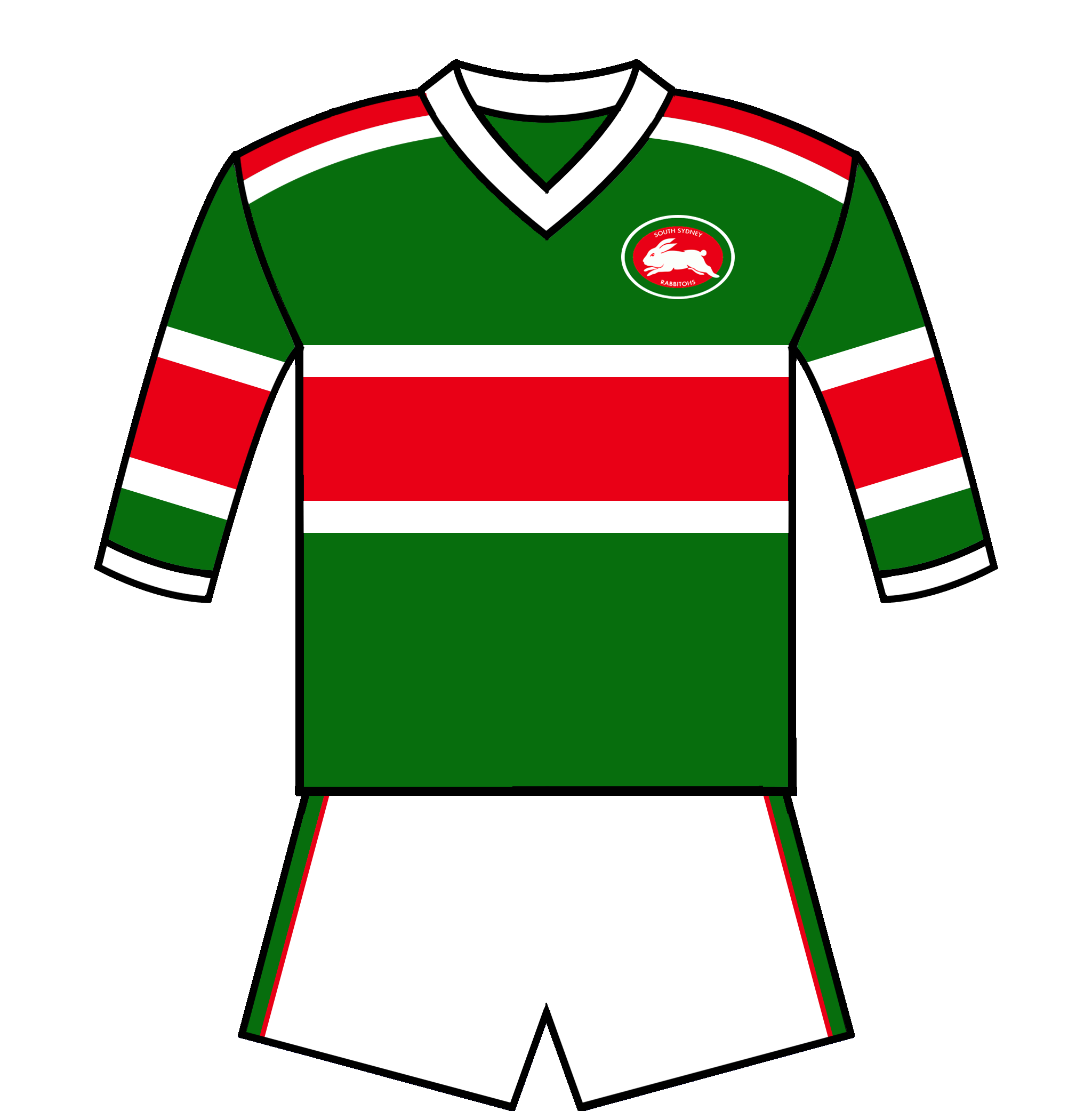
South Sydney 74th season Ground: Redfern Oval; Coach: Bill Anderson; Captain: Nathan Gibbs→Mitch Brennan

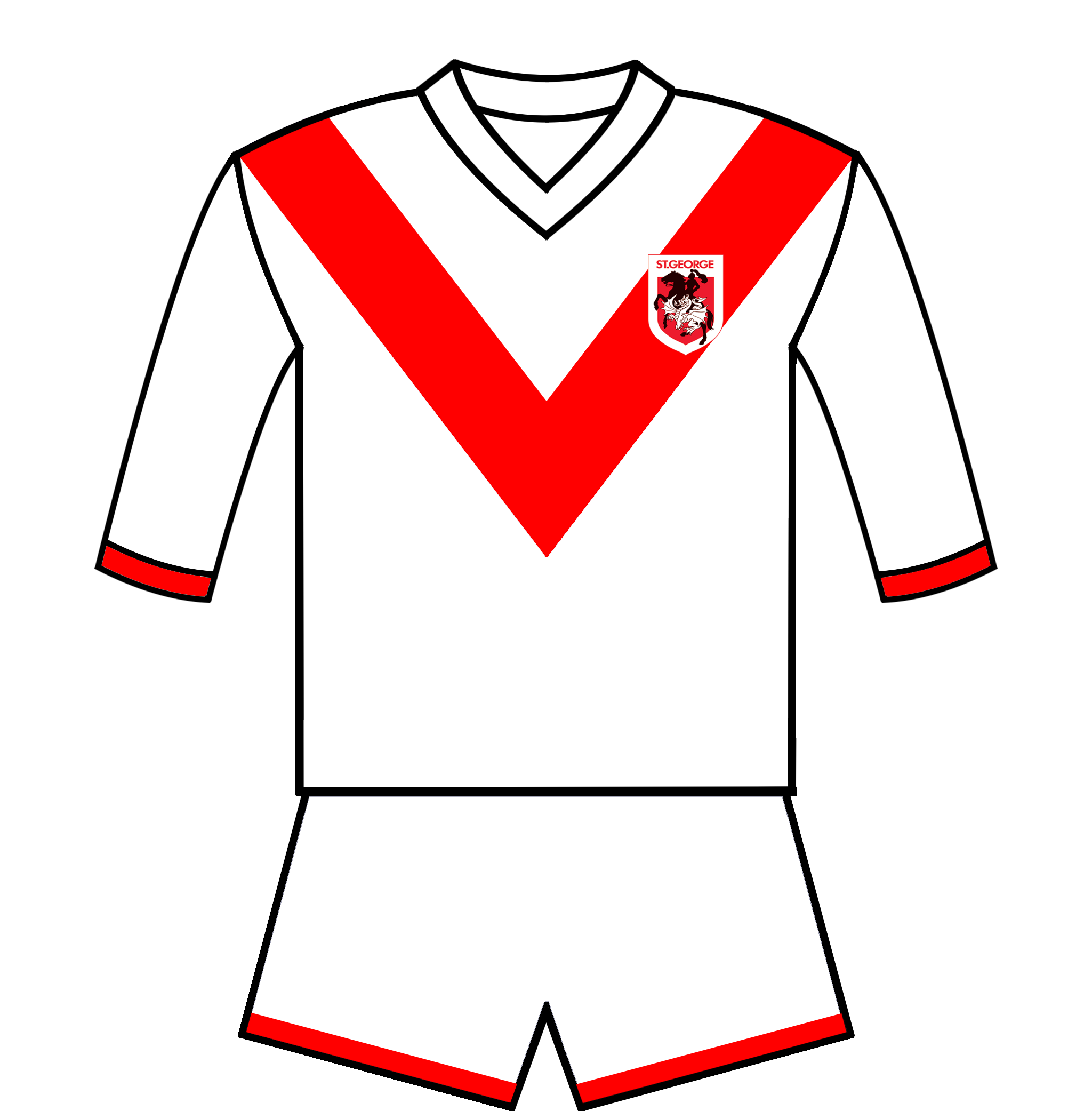
St. George 61st season Ground: Kogarah Oval; Coach: Harry Bath; Captain: Craig Young

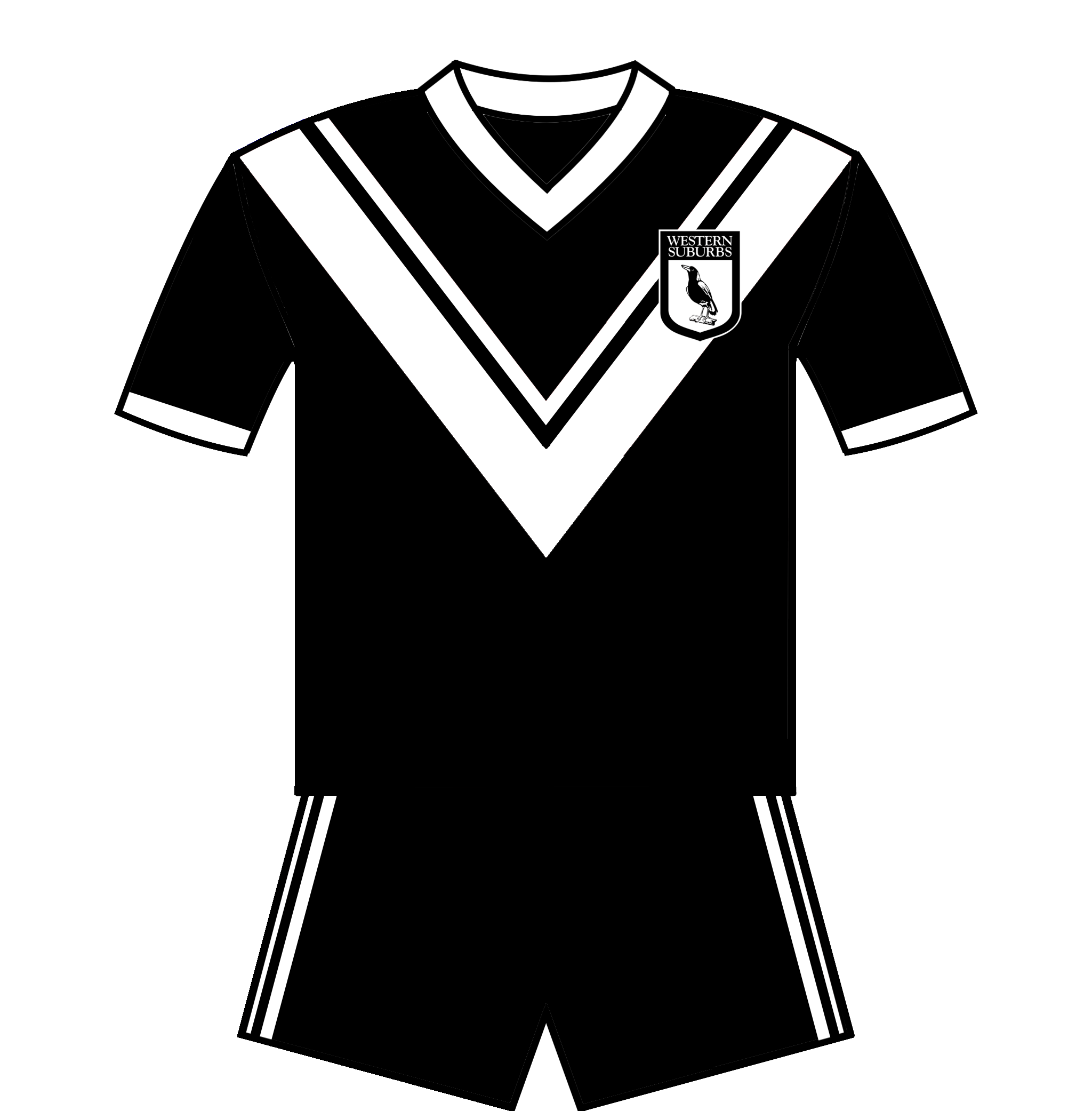
Western Suburbs 74th season Ground: Lidcombe Oval; Coach: Roy Masters; Captain: Warren Boland

== Regular season ==
Team	1	2	3	4	5	6	7	8	9	10	11	12	13	14	15	16	17	18	19	20	21	22	23	F1	F2	F3	GF
Balmain Tigers	**EAS** **+1**	**MAN** **−7**	NEW −8	**CBY** **−39**	SOU −15	CRO −6	**NOR** **+5**	STG −3	PAR −19	**WES** **−7**	**PEN** **+7**	X	EAS −1	MAN −7	**NEW** **−1**	CBY −11	**SOU** **+3**	**CRO** **−3**	NOR −10	**STG**; **0**	**PAR** **−9**	WES +9	PEN +19				
Canterbury Bulldogs	**STG** **−26**	PAR −4	**WES** **+19**	BAL +39	EAS −10	**MAN** **+11**	**NEW** **−10**	PEN −10	X	**CRO** **−7**	NOR +11	SOU −3	STG −6	**PAR** **−14**	WES −17	**BAL** **+11**	**EAS** **−33**	MAN −7	NEW +15	**PEN** **−4**	**SOU** **+26**	CRO +18	**NOR** **−3**				
Cronulla Sharks	PEN −11	NOR +18	**STG** **+6**	**PAR** **+11**	WES +3	**BAL** **+6**	**EAS** **−9**	MAN −5	X	CBY +7	**SOU**; **0**	**NEW** **−6**	**PEN** **+9**	**NOR** **+1**	STG +20	PAR −15	**WES** **+1**	BAL +3	EAS +2	**MAN** **−9**	NEW −14	**CBY** **−18**	SOU +2	**MAN** **−3**			
Eastern Suburbs Roosters	BAL −1	**PEN** **+3**	MAN +6	**NEW** **+22**	**CBY** **+10**	SOU −5	CRO +9	**NOR** **+1**	X	PAR +8	**WES** **+4**	**STG** **+18**	**BAL** **+1**	PEN +14	**MAN** **+10**	NEW −10	CBY +33	**SOU** **−5**	**CRO** **−2**	NOR +20	STG +12	**PAR** **+14**	WES −2	X	**PAR** **−4**	**NEW** **−10**	
Manly Sea Eagles	WES +12	BAL +7	**EAS** **−6**	PEN −18	**NEW** **−12**	CBY −11	**SOU** **+8**	**CRO** **+5**	NOR −19	STG −18	**PAR** **+14**	X	**WES** **+28**	**BAL** **+7**	EAS −10	**PEN** **−6**	NEW; 0	**CBY** **+7**	SOU +11	CRO +9	**NOR** **+20**	**STG** **+5**	PAR; 0	CRO +3	NEW −5		
Newtown Jets	PAR −24	**WES**; **0**	**BAL** **+8**	EAS −22	MAN +12	**PEN** **+18**	CBY +10	**SOU** **+16**	X	**NOR** **−2**	**STG** **+17**	CRO +6	**PAR** **+5**	WES −16	BAL +1	**EAS** **+10**	**MAN**; **0**	PEN +10	**CBY** **−15**	SOU −3	**CRO** **+14**	NOR +4	STG +9	**PAR** **−2**	**MAN** **+5**	EAS +10	**PAR** **−9**
North Sydney Bears	SOU +15	**CRO** **−18**	PEN −10	**STG** **+29**	PAR +2	**WES** **−15**	BAL −5	EAS −1	**MAN** **+19**	NEW +2	**CBY** **−11**	X	**SOU** **+5**	CRO −1	**PEN** **+21**	STG −7	**PAR** **−14**	WES −13	**BAL** **+10**	**EAS** **−20**	MAN −20	**NEW** **−4**	CBY +3				
Parramatta Eels	**NEW** **+24**	**CBY** **+4**	SOU +34	CRO −11	**NOR** **−2**	**STG** **+9**	PEN +3	WES −6	**BAL** **+19**	**EAS** **−8**	MAN −14	X	NEW −5	CBY +14	**SOU** **+11**	**CRO** **+15**	NOR +14	STG +12	**PEN** **+17**	**WES** **+27**	BAL +9	EAS −14	**MAN**; **0**	NEW +2	EAS +4	X	NEW +9
Penrith Panthers	**CRO** **+11**	EAS −3	**NOR** **+10**	**MAN** **+18**	STG −8	NEW −18	**PAR** **−3**	**CBY** **+10**	WES −1	**SOU** **+19**	BAL −7	X	CRO −9	**EAS** **−14**	NOR −21	MAN +6	**STG** **+15**	**NEW** **−10**	PAR −17	CBY +4	**WES** **−2**	SOU −6	**BAL** **−19**				
South Sydney Rabbitohs	**NOR** **−15**	STG −9	**PAR** **−34**	WES −2	**BAL** **+15**	**EAS** **+5**	MAN −8	NEW −16	X	PEN −19	CRO; 0	**CBY** **+3**	NOR −5	**STG** **+17**	PAR −11	**WES** **+6**	BAL −3	EAS +5	**MAN** **−11**	**NEW** **+3**	CBY −26	**PEN** **+6**	**CRO** **−2**				
St. George Dragons	CBY +26	**SOU** **+9**	CRO −6	NOR −29	**PEN** **+8**	PAR −9	**WES** **−4**	**BAL** **+3**	X	**MAN** **+18**	NEW −17	EAS −18	**CBY** **+6**	SOU −17	**CRO** **−20**	**NOR** **+7**	PEN −15	**PAR** **−12**	WES +17	BAL; 0	**EAS** **−12**	MAN −5	**NEW** **−9**				
Western Suburbs Magpies	**MAN** **−12**	NEW; 0	CBY −19	**SOU** **+2**	**CRO** **−3**	NOR +15	STG +4	**PAR** **+6**	**PEN** **+1**	BAL +7	EAS −4	X	MAN −28	**NEW** **+16**	**CBY** **+17**	SOU −6	CRO −1	**NOR** **+13**	**STG** **−17**	PAR −27	PEN +2	**BAL** **−9**	**EAS** **+2**				
Team	1	2	3	4	5	6	7	8	9	10	11	12	13	14	15	16	17	18	19	20	21	22	23	F1	F2	F3	GF

Bold – Home game
X – Bye
Opponent for round listed above margin

=== Ladder ===
Pos	Team	Pld	W	D	L	PF	PA	PD	Pts
1	Eastern Suburbs	22	16	0	6	385	225	+160	32
2	Newtown	22	14	2	6	326	268	+58	30
3	Parramatta	22	14	1	7	398	246	+152	29
4	Cronulla	22	13	1	8	339	337	+2	27
5	Manly	22	12	2	8	350	317	+33	26
6	Western Suburbs	22	11	1	10	311	352	-41	23
7	North Sydney	22	9	0	13	322	355	-33	18
8	St. George	22	8	1	13	320	399	-79	17
9	South Sydney	22	8	1	13	322	423	-101	17
10	Canterbury	22	8	0	14	340	344	-4	16
11	Penrith	22	8	0	14	305	350	-45	16
12	Balmain	22	6	1	15	293	395	-102	13

=== Ladder progression ===
- Numbers highlighted in green indicate that the team finished the round inside the top 5.
- Numbers highlighted in blue indicates the team finished first on the ladder in that round.
- Numbers highlighted in red indicates the team finished last place on the ladder in that round.
- Underlined numbers indicate that the team had a bye during that round.

	Team	1	2	3	4	5	6	7	8	9	10	11	12	13	14	15	16	17	18	19	20	21	22	23
1	Eastern Suburbs Roosters	0	2	4	6	8	8	10	12	12	14	16	18	20	22	24	24	26	26	26	28	30	32	32
2	Newtown Jets	0	1	3	3	5	7	9	11	11	11	13	15	17	17	19	21	22	24	24	24	26	28	30
3	Parramatta Eels	2	4	6	6	6	8	10	10	12	12	12	12	12	14	16	18	20	22	24	26	28	28	29
4	Cronulla Sharks	0	2	4	6	8	10	10	10	10	12	13	13	15	17	19	19	21	23	25	25	25	25	27
5	Manly Sea Eagles	2	4	4	4	4	4	6	8	8	8	10	10	12	14	14	14	15	17	19	21	23	25	26
6	Western Suburbs Magpies	0	1	1	3	3	5	7	9	11	13	13	13	13	15	17	17	17	19	19	19	21	21	23
7	North Sydney Bears	2	2	2	4	6	6	6	6	8	10	10	10	12	12	14	14	14	14	16	16	16	16	18
8	St. George Dragons	2	4	4	4	6	6	6	8	8	10	10	10	12	12	12	14	14	14	16	17	17	17	17
9	South Sydney Rabbitohs	0	0	0	0	2	4	4	4	4	4	5	7	7	9	9	11	11	13	13	15	15	17	17
10	Canterbury Bulldogs	0	0	2	4	4	6	6	6	6	6	8	8	8	8	8	10	10	10	12	12	14	16	16
11	Penrith Panthers	2	2	4	6	6	6	6	8	8	10	10	10	10	10	10	12	14	14	14	16	16	16	16
12	Balmain Tigers	2	2	2	2	2	2	4	4	4	4	6	6	6	6	6	6	8	8	8	9	9	11	13

== Finals ==
The elimination semi-final between Newtown and Manly will always be remembered for the notorious all-in brawl, with the main combatants Newtown's Steve Bowden and Manly hardman Mark Broadhurst. Bowden was marched for the incident and was unable to take part in the preliminary final against Eastern Suburbs or the grand final against Parramatta.

Home	Score	Away	Match information
Home	Score	Away	Date and time	Venue	Referee	Crowd
Qualifying Finals
Newtown	8–10	Parramatta	5 September 1981	Sydney Cricket Ground	John Gocher	17,265
Cronulla	11–14	Manly	6 September 1981	Sydney Cricket Ground	Greg Hartley	21,635
Semi-finals
Eastern Suburbs	8–12	Parramatta	12 September 1981	Sydney Cricket Ground	Greg Hartley	27,600
Newtown	20–15	Manly	13 September 1981	Sydney Cricket Ground	John Gocher	22,440
Preliminary final
Eastern Suburbs	5–15	Newtown	19 September 1981	Sydney Cricket Ground	Greg Hartley	25,243

=== Chart ===
Qualifying final
2	Newtown	8
3	Parramatta	10
4	Cronulla	11
5	Manly	14

Major semi-final
1	Eastern Suburbs	8
Parramatta	12
Minor semi-final
Newtown	20
Manly	15

Preliminary final
Eastern Suburbs	5
Newtown	15

Grand final
Parramatta	20
Newtown	11

=== Grand final ===
Parramatta	Position	Newtown
1. Steve McKenzie	FB	1. Phil Sigsworth
2. Graeme Atkins	WG	2. John Ferguson
3. Mick Cronin	CE	3. Mick Ryan
4. Steve Ella	CE	4. Brian Hetherington
5. Eric Grothe	WG	5. Ray Blacklock
6. Brett Kenny	FE	6. Paul Morris
7. Peter Sterling	HB	7. Tommy Raudonikis (c)
13. Bob O'Reilly	PR	13. Craig Ellis
12. Steve Edge (c)	HK	12. Barry Jensen
11. Ron Hilditch	PR	11. Steve Blyth
10. Kevin Stevens	SR	10. Phil Gould
9. John Muggleton	SR	9. Mick Pitman
8. Ray Price	LK	8. Graeme O'Grady
14. Steve Sharp	Reserve	14. Ken Wilson
18. Paul Taylor	Reserve	15. Jim Walters
	Reserve	20. Shane McKellar
	Reserve	26. Geoff Bugden
Jack Gibson	Coach	Warren Ryan

Newtown had reached their first grand final in twenty-six years. Parramatta led 7–6 at half-time, but the Jets looked set to spring a major upset when tough half back Tommy Raudonikis crashed over to score early in the second-half. Then the Eels' brilliant backline exploded into action. The combination of Brett Kenny, Mick Cronin, Peter Sterling, Eric Grothe and Steve Ella dominated and would go on to feature in five grand finals and four premierships by the end of 1986.

Steve Edge became the first player to captain two different sides to premiership victory having captained St. George to a win over the Eels in season 1977.

Master coach Jack Gibson had just six words for a packed Parramatta Leagues Club auditorium, who had just witnessed the Eels' first ever premiership since their 1947 entry to the competition. "Ding, dong, the witch is dead," he said before the thunderous chants of the success-starved blue and gold army of fans.

=== Match details ===
27 September 1981

Newtown Jets	11 – 20	Parramatta Eels
Tries: Graeme O'Grady 1 Brian Hetherington 1 Tommy Raudonikis 1 Goals: Paul Morris 1/3	1st: 6 - 7; 2nd: 5 - 13; Report	Tries: Brett Kenny 2 Graeme Atkins 1 Steve Ella 1 Goals: Mick Cronin 4/6

Sydney Cricket Ground
Attendance: 57,333
Referee: Greg Hartley
Player of the Match: Bob O'Reilly (Note: Awarded retrospectively in 2008.)

==== Cumberland Oval ====
In the resultant celebrations at Parramatta with a large group of supporters having gathered at the Eels homeground of Cumberland Oval, subsequently lit a fire that burned the grandstand to the ground. In late 1984 a construction contract was signed by the NSW Government, with the new Parramatta Stadium being opened on 5 March 1986 by Queen Elizabeth II. Parramatta Stadium itself was knocked down along with the adjacent public pools, in 2017. The new stadium, the Western Sydney Stadium was opened on 14 April 2019.

== Player statistics ==
The following statistics are as of the conclusion of Round 22.

Top 5 point scorers

Points	Player	Tries	Goals	Field Goals
183	Steve Rogers	13	72	0
183	Steve Gearin	13	72	0
164	Mick Cronin	6	73	0
142	Mark Ross	8	59	0
138	Ron Giteau	5	61	1

Top 5 try scorers

Tries	Player
15	Terry Fahey
13	Steve Ella
13	Steve Rogers
13	John Gibbs
13	Steve Gearin

Top 5 goal scorers

Goals	Player
73	Mick Cronin
72	Steve Rogers
72	Steve Gearin
61	Ron Giteau
59	Mark Ross
