= 1973 Kangaroo tour of Great Britain and France =

1973 rugby league tour

- Manager: Charles Gibson; Albert Bishop
- Coach(es): Graeme Langlands
- Tour captain(s): Graeme Langlands; Bob McCarthy; Tom Raudonikis; Arthur Beetson
- Top point scorer(s): Mick Cronin 77
- Top try scorer(s): Bob Fulton 20
- Top test point scorer(s): Bob Fulton 15
- Top test try scorer(s): Bob Fulton 5
Summary
P	W	D	L
Total
19	17	0	2
Test match
5	4	0	1
Opponent
P	W	D	L
Great Britain
3	2	0	1
France
2	2	0	0

Tour chronology
- Previous tour: 1967-68
- Next tour: 1978

The 1973 Kangaroo Tour was the thirteenth Kangaroo Tour, and saw the Australian national rugby league team travel to Europe and play nineteen matches against British and French club and representative rugby league teams, in addition to three Test matches against Great Britain and two Tests against the French. It followed the tour of 1967-68 and the next was staged in 1978.

Due to the advent of the Jet Age which had made international travel times much shorter (a Jumbo Jet airplane could travel between Sydney and London in a day compared to the weeks it took a ship at sea), and with a slimed down tour itinerary (the 1973 Kangaroos played 19 games compared to the 27 played by the 1967-68 Kangaroos), this was the first Kangaroo Tour of Great Britain and France to be held inside of a single calendar year.

== The squad's leadership ==
The team was captain-coached by Graeme Langlands making his third Kangaroo Tour. Managers of the team were Albert Bishop and Charlie Gibson with Alf Richards as the team trainer.

== Touring squad ==
The following players were in the touring squad.

Player	Club	Position(s)	Tests	Games	Tries	Goals	F/Goals	Points
Arthur Beetson (vc)	Eastern Suburbs Roosters	Prop	5	16	3	0	0	9
Ray Branighan	Manly-Warringah Sea Eagles	Centre, Wing, Fullback	4	13	7	2	0	25
Mick Cronin	Gerringong Lions	Centre	2	12	7	28	0	77
Graham Eadie	Manly-Warringah Sea Eagles	Fullback	2	10	4	9	0	30
Bob Fulton	Manly-Warringah Sea Eagles	Centre, Five-eighth	5	14	20	0	1	61
Ted Goodwin	St George Dragons	Wing, Centre	3	10	7	0	0	21
Bill Hamilton	Manly-Warringah Sea Eagles	Prop	0	8	1	0	0	3
John Lang	Eastern Suburbs Tigers (Qld)	Hooker	1	7	2	0	0	6
Graeme Langlands (c)	St George Dragons	Fullback, Centre	1	8	4	27	0	66
Ken Maddison	Cronulla-Sutherland Sharks	Second-row	4	13	6	0	0	18
Bob McCarthy (vc)	South Sydney Rabbitohs	Second-row	2	8	4	0	0	12
John O'Neill	Manly-Warringah Sea Eagles	Prop	1	6	0	0	0	0
Bob O'Reilly	Parramatta Eels	Prop	4	13	0	0	0	0
Warren Orr	Wests Panthers (Qld)	Wing	0	6	4	0	0	12
Tim Pickup	North Sydney Bears	Five-eighth, Halfback	4	12	2	0	0	6
Greg Pierce	Cronulla-Sutherland Sharks	Lock, Second-row	1	8	1	0	0	3
Terry Randall	Manly-Warringah Sea Eagles	Second-row, Lock	0	5	1	0	0	3
Tom Raudonikis (vc)	Western Suburbs Magpies	Halfback	4	10	3	0	0	9
Steve Rogers	Cronulla-Sutherland Sharks	Centre	0	7	2	0	0	6
Paul Sait	South Sydney Rabbitohs	Second-row, Lock	4	13	2	0	0	6
Geoff Starling	Balmain Tigers	Centre, Lock	5	13	8	0	0	24
Gary Stevens	South Sydney Rabbitohs	Second-row	3	8	1	0	0	3
David Waite	Wests Wollongong	Wing	4	12	4	0	0	12
Elwyn Walters	South Sydney Rabbitohs	Hooker	4	15	2	0	0	6
Dennis Ward	Western Suburbs Rosellas	Halfback	0	8	1	0	0	3
Lionel Williamson	Newtown Bluebags	Wing	3	9	0	0	0	0

1973 NSWRFL Premiers Manly-Warringah provided a record 6 players to the Kangaroos while the team they defeated in the Grand Final Cronulla-Sutherland, provided 3 players. Surprisingly, no players were selected from either of the 1973 Brisbane Rugby League Grand Finalists, winners Fortitude Valley or runners up Redcliffe.

Of the 26 player squad, 21 were from New South Wales and 5 from Queensland, with 3 of the Queenslanders picked Sydney teams (team vice captain Arthur Beetson (Easts), Souths hooker Elwyn Walters and Newtown winger Lionel Williamson). Brisbane Easts hooker John Lang and Brisbane Wests winger Warren Orr were the only players picked from Queensland based clubs.

== Great Britain ==
The Ashes series against Great Britain saw an aggregate crowd of 36,567 attending the Test series

=== Test Venues ===
The three Ashes series tests took place at the following venues.

London	Leeds	Warrington
Wembley	Headingley	Wilderspool
Capacity: 100,000	Capacity: 30,000	Capacity: 15,000

Sunday, 30 September	Salford	12 – 15	Australia	The Willows, Salford
3.30pm	Tries: 2 Ian Holland; Keith Fielding; Goals: 3 David Watkins (3)	[ Report]	Tries: 3 Bob Fulton (3); Goals: 3 Graeme Langlands (3)	Attendance: 11,064; Gate £4,711; Referee: M. J. Naughton

Wednesday, 3 October	Wakefield Trinity	9 – 13	Australia	Belle Vue, Wakefield
	Tries: 1 D. Topliss; Goals: 3 T. Crook (3)	[ Report]	Tries: 3 Bill Hamilton; Steve Rogers; David Waite; Goals: 2 Graham Eadie (2)	Attendance: 5,863; Gate £2,004; Referee: R. Jackson

Sunday, 7 October	Dewsbury	3 – 17	Australia	Old Crown Flatt ground, Dewsbury
3.30pm	Tries: nil Goals: 1 N. Stephenson; Field goals: 1 N. Stephenson	[ Report]	Tries: 3 Bob Fulton (2); Paul Sait; Goals: 4 Graeme Langlands (4)	Attendance: 5,865; Gate £2,059; Referee: G. Kershaw

Wednesday, 10 October	Castleford	10 – 16	Australia	Wheldon Road, Castleford
7.30pm	Tries: nil Goals: 5 S. Lloyd (5)	[ Report]	Tries: 4 Graham Eadie; Mick Cronin; Ray Branighan; Ken Maddison; Goals: 2 Graham Eadie (2)	Attendance: 2,419; Gate £947; Referee: K. Allatt

Sunday, 14 October	Widnes	10 – 25	Australia	Naughton Park, Widnes
3.00pm	Tries: 2 T. Warburton; D. Macko; Goals: 2 R. Dutton (2)	[ Report]	Tries: 7 Graeme Langlands (2); Bob Fulton; Warren Orr; Tom Raudonikis; Gary Stevens; Bob McCarthy; Goals: 2 Graeme Langlands; Mick Cronin	Attendance: 5,185; Gate £1,710; Referee: Harry Hunt

Friday, 19 October	Oldham	10 – 44	Australia	Watersheddings, Oldham
7.30pm	Tries: 2 P. Astbury; J. Blair; Goals: 2 T. Clawson (2)	[ Report]	Tries: 10; Geoff Starling (4); Ken Maddison (2); Bob McCarthy; Paul Sait; Ted Goodwin; Mick Cronin; Goals: 7 Mick Cronin (7)	Attendance: 2,895; Gate £991

Wednesday, 24 October	Cumberland (Cumbria)	2 – 28	Australia	Recreation Ground, Whitehaven
2.15pm	Tries: nil Goals: 1 R. Nicholson	[ Report]	Tries: 6 Ted Goodwin (2); David Waite (2); Graham Eadie; Mick Cronin; Goals: 5 Mick Cronin (5)	Attendance: 3,666; Gate £1,258; Referee: Mick Naughton

Sunday, 28 October	Bradford Northern	14 – 50	Australia	Odsal, Bradford
3.00pm	Tries: 2 A. Long; G. Joyce; Goals: 4 E. Tees (4)	[ Report]	Tries: 12; Bob Fulton (4); Tom Raudonikis (2); Arthur Beetson (2); Terry Randall; Tim Pickup; Ted Goodwin; Geoff Starling; Goals: 7 Graeme Langlands (7)	Attendance: 5,667; Referee: F. Lindop

=== The Ashes series ===
==== First Test ====
In the first rugby league international played at Wembley since 1963, the Lions shocked the then unbeaten Australian's 21–12 in front of just 9,874 fans. The match had been moved to Wembley from the Central Park ground in Wigan at the request of the Australian team management.

Saturday, 3 November 1973

Great Britain	21 – 12	Australia
Tries: Phil Lowe (2); Colin Clarke; Brian Lockwood; Goals: Terry Clawson (4); Field Goals: Steve Nash (1)		Tries: Ray Branighan; Bob Fulton Goals: Graeme Langlands (3)

Wembley Stadium, London
Attendance: 9,874
Referee: Billy Thompson (England)
Player of the Match: Phil Lowe

Great Britain	Australia

FB	1	Paul Charlton
RW	2	Clive Sullivan (c)
RC	3	Syd Hynes
LC	4	Chris Hesketh
LW	5	John Atkinson
SO	6	David Topliss
SH	7	Steve Nash
PR	8	Terry Clawson
HK	9	Colin Clarke
PR	10	Brian Lockwood
SR	11	Phil Lowe
SR	12	George Nicholls
LK	13	Ray Batten
Substitutions:
IC	14
IC	15
Coach:
(England) Jim Challinor

FB	1	Graeme Langlands (c)
RW	2	Ray Branighan
RC	3	Bob Fulton
LC	4	Geoff Starling
LW	5	Ted Goodwin
FE	6	Tim Pickup
HB	7	Tommy Raudonikis
PR	8	Bob O'Reilly
HK	9	Elwyn Walters
PR	10	Arthur Beetson
SR	11	Bob McCarthy
SR	12	Ken Maddison
LF	13	Paul Sait
Substitutions:
IC	14
IC	15
Coach:
(Australia) Graeme Langlands

Wednesday, 7 November	Hull Kingston Rovers	9 – 25	Australia	Craven Park, Hull
7.30pm	Tries: 1 G. Dunn; Goals: 3 Roger Millward (3)	[ Report]	Tries: 5 Mick Cronin (2); Graham Eadie (2); Bob McCarthy; Goals: 5 Mick Cronin (5)	Attendance: 5,150; Gate £1,747; Referee: P. Geraghty

Saturday, 10 November	Huddersfield	2 – 32	Australia	Fartown, Huddersfield
	Tries: nil Goals: 1 F. Davies	[ Report]	Tries: 8 Bob Fulton (3); Ray Branighan (2); Arthur Beetson; David Waite; Mick Cronin; Goals: Graeme Langlands (4)	Attendance: 1,333; Gate £451; Referee: R. Wood

Sunday, 11 November	Leigh	4 – 31	Australia	Hilton Park, Leigh
	Tries: nil Goals: 2 J. Fiddler (2)	[ Report]	Tries: 7 Graeme Langlands (2); Ted Goodwin; Steve Rogers; Warren Orr; Tim Pickup; John Lang; Goals: 5 Graeme Langlands (5)	Attendance: 2,607; Gate £826; Referee: A. Givvons

Tuesday, 13 November	St. Helens	11 – 7	Australia	Knowsley Road, St. Helens
	Tries: 1 F. Wilson; Goals: 4 K. Coslett (4)	[ Report]	Tries: 1 Geoff Starling; Goals: 2 Mick Cronin (2)	Attendance: 10,013; Gate £3,419; Referee: T. Keane

Sunday, 18 November	Featherstone Rovers	13 – 18	Australia	Post Office Road, Featherstone
3.00pm	Tries: 2 L. Tonks; W. Harris; Goals: 3 H. Box (3); Field Goals: 1 S. Nash	[ Report]	Tries: 4 Ray Branighan (2); Bob Fulton; Elwyn Walters; Goals: 3 Mick Cronin (3)	Attendance: 5,659; Gate £7,776; Referee: S. Shepherd

==== Second Test ====
The second test at Headingley in Leeds saw the Australian's tie the series at one game all with a 14–6 win in front of the tours largest attendance of 16,674.

Saturday, 24 November 1973

Great Britain	6 – 14	Australia
Tries: Goals: Terry Clawson (3)		Tries: Bob McCarthy; Goals: Graham Eadie (5)

Headingley, Leeds
Attendance: 16,674
Referee: Billy Thompson (England)
Player of the Match: Graham Eadie

Great Britain	Australia

FB	1	Paul Charlton
RW	2	Clive Sullivan (c)
RC	3	Syd Hynes
LC	4	Chris Hesketh
LW	5	John Atkinson
SO	6	David Topliss
SH	7	Steve Nash
PR	8	Terry Clawson
HK	9	Colin Clarke
PR	10	Brian Lockwood
SR	11	Phil Lowe
SR	12	John Mantle
LK	13	Ray Batten
Substitutions:
IC	14	David Eckersley
IC	15	Colin Dixon
Coach:
(England) Jim Challinor

FB	1	Graham Eadie
RW	2	Lionel Williamson
RC	3	Geoff Starling
LC	4	Ray Branighan
LW	5	Ted Goodwin
FE	6	Bob Fulton
HB	7	Tommy Raudonikis
PR	8	Bob O'Reilly
HK	9	Elwyn Walters
PR	10	Arthur Beetson
SR	11	Bob McCarthy (c)
SR	12	Gary Stevens
LF	13	Paul Sait
Substitutions:
IC	14	Ken Maddison
IC	15
Coach:
(Australia) Graeme Langlands

Kangaroos captain-coach Graeme Langlands was ruled out of the second test with a broken hand. To replace him at fullback, Langlands selected Manly-Warringah's 19 year old dual premiership winning fullback Graham Eadie to make his test debut (Eadie, known affectionately as "Wombat", would turn 20 the next day). Eadie was also handed the goal kicking duties on the day and despite a very strong wind making conditions tricky for kickers, kicked 5 goals which proved vital in the Kangaroos 14–6 win over the Lions to keep The Ashes series alive.

After conceding 4 tries in the first test loss at Wembley, the Kangaroos kept their line intact with the Lions only scores coming from 3 goals by prop forward Terry Clawson.

==== Third Test ====
The Kangaroos won back The Ashes with a hard-fought 15–5 win in trying conditions at Warrington. The pitch at Wilderspool was frozen which suited the Australians who were used to playing on hard grounds at home.

Saturday, 1 December 1973

Great Britain	5 – 15	Australia
Tries: Roger Millward Goals: Roger Millward		Tries: Ken Maddison (2); Bob Fulton; Geoff Starling; Elwyn Walters; Goals: Graham Eadie (0/4); Ray Branighan (0/2)

Wilderspool, Warrington
Attendance: 10,019
Referee: Billy Thompson (England)
Player of the Match: Ken Maddison

Great Britain	Australia

FB	1	Paul Charlton
RW	2	Alan Smith
RC	3	Syd Hynes
LC	4	Chris Hesketh
LW	5	Clive Sullivan (c)
SO	6	David Eckersley
SH	7	Roger Millward
PR	8	Terry Clawson
HK	9	Colin Clarke
PR	10	Mick Harrison
SR	11	George Nicholls
SR	12	Phil Lowe
LK	13	Doug Laughton
Substitutions:
IC	14	David Watkins
IC	15	Colin Dixon
Coach:
(England) Jim Challinor

FB	1	Graham Eadie
RW	2	Lionel Williamson
RC	3	Geoff Starling
LC	4	Ray Branighan
LW	5	David Waite
FE	6	Bob Fulton
HB	7	Tommy Raudonikis (c)
PR	8	Bob O'Reilly
HK	9	Elwyn Walters
PR	10	Arthur Beetson
SR	11	Ken Maddison
SR	12	Gary Stevens
LF	13	Paul Sait
Substitutions:
IC	14	Tim Pickup
IC	15
Coach:
(Australia) Graeme Langlands

With coach Graeme Langlands still out with a broken hand and looking on from the sidelines, the Kangaroos wrapped up the Ashes with a 15–5 win on the frozen ground at Wilderspool. Man of the match Ken Maddison crossed for two tries while Warrington born Bob Fulton, centre Geoff Starling and hooker Elwyn Walters also crossed for tries. For the Lions, their only score came from a try and goal from Hull Kingston Rovers halfback Roger Millward.

== France ==
Date	Opponent	Score	Ground	Referee	Crowd	Report
9 December	France	9 – 21	Stade Gilbert Brutus, Perpignan	G. Jameau (FRA)	5,109	
12 December	France XIII	12 – 24	Stade Chaban-Delmas, Bordeaux		2,523	
16 December	France	3 – 14	Stade des Minimes, Toulouse	M. Caillol (FRA)	7,060	

=== French Tests ===
==== First test ====
Sunday, 9 December 1973

France	9 – 21	Australia
Tries: Michel Molinier; André Ruiz Goals; Roger Garrigue (1) Field Goals: Roger Garrigue (1)		Tries: Bob Fulton (2); Ted Goodwin (2); Geoff Starling; Goals; Ray Branighan (2); Michael Cronin (1)

Stade Gilbert Brutus, Perpignan
Attendance: 5,109
Referee: Georges Jameau (France)

France	Australia

FB	1	Maurice de Matos
RW	2	Serge Marsolan
RC	3	Michel Molinier
LC	4	André Ruiz
LW	5	Jean-Claude Marty
SO	6	Patrick Rives
SH	7	Roger Garrigue (c)
PR	8	Christian Carré
HK	9	Jacques Franc
PR	10	Charles Thénégal
SR	11	Jean-Jacques Cologni
SR	12	Jean-Paul Sauret
LK	13	Georges Bonet
Substitutions:
IC	14	Marius Frattini
IC	15	Serge Gleyzes
Coach:

FB	1	Ray Branighan
RW	2	Lionel Williamson
RC	3	Bob Fulton
LC	4	Michael Cronin
LW	5	David Waite
FE	6	Tim Pickup
HB	7	Tommy Raudonikis (c)
PR	8	Arthur Beetson
HK	9	John Lang
PR	10	John O'Neill
SR	11	Greg Pierce
SR	12	Elwyn Walters
LF	13	Geoff Starling
Substitutions:
IC	14	Ted Goodwin
IC	15
Coach:
(Australia) Graeme Langlands

==== Second Test ====
Arthur Beetson became the first aboriginal player to captain Australia in a rugby league Test match.

Sunday, 16 December 1973

France	3 – 14	Australia
Tries: Jacques Franc Goals:		Tries: Ray Branighan; Michael Cronin; Bob Fulton; Ken Maddison; Goals: Michael Cronin (1)

Stade des Minimes, Toulouse
Attendance: 2,000
Referee: Marcel Caillol (France)

France	Australia

FB	1	José Calle
RW	2	Serge Marsolan
RC	3	Michel Molinier
LC	4	André Ruiz
LW	5	Jean-Claude Marty
SO	6	Michel Mazaré
SH	7	Roger Garrigue (c)
PR	8	Victor Serrano
HK	9	Jacques Franc
PR	10	Christian Carré
SR	11	Jean-Paul Sauret
SR	12	Jean-Jacques Cologni
LK	13	Serge Gleyzes
Substitutions:
IC	14	Georges Bonet
IC	15	Lambert Brunet
Coach:

FB	1	Ray Branighan
RW	2	Ted Goodwin
RC	3	Michael Cronin
LC	4	Geoff Starling
LW	5	David Waite
FE	6	Bob Fulton
HB	7	Tim Pickup
PR	8	Bob O'Reilly
HK	9	Elwyn Walters
PR	10	Arthur Beetson (c)
SR	11	Ken Maddison
SR	12	Gary Stevens
LF	13	Paul Sait
Substitutions:
IC	14
IC	15
Coach:
(Australia) Graeme Langlands
