= 1979 Cronulla-Sutherland Sharks season =

- NSWRFL rank: 3rd
- 1979 record: Wins: 14; draws: 1; losses: 9
- Points scored: For: 416 (83 tries, 82 goals, 3 field goals); against: 324 (53 tries, 80 goals, 5 field goals)

Team information
- Coach: Norm Provan
- Captain: Greg Pierce Steve Rogers
- Stadium: Endeavour Field
- Avg. attendance: 10,507

Top scorers
- Tries: Steve Edmonds (13)
- Goals: Steve Rogers (32)
- Points: Steve Rogers (86)
← 1978	1980 →

The 1979 Cronulla-Sutherland Sharks season was the thirteenth in the club's history. They competed in the NSWRFL's 1979 Premiership and also won the 1979 Amco Cup.

== Ladder ==
	Team	Pld	W	D	L	PF	PA	PD	Pts
1	St. George	22	17	0	5	476	309	+167	34
2	Parramatta	22	16	0	6	490	317	+173	32
3	Cronulla-Sutherland	22	14	1	7	367	270	+97	29
4	Western Suburbs	22	14	0	8	396	312	+84	28
5	Canterbury-Bankstown	22	13	0	9	379	310	+69	26
6	Balmain	22	12	1	9	358	313	+45	25
7	Manly-Warringah	22	11	1	10	341	353	-12	23
8	Eastern Suburbs	22	9	1	12	250	321	-71	19
9	South Sydney	22	9	0	13	286	329	-43	18
10	Penrith	22	6	2	14	211	473	-162	14
11	Newtown Jets	22	6	0	16	321	423	-102	12
12	North Sydney	22	2	0	20	302	547	-245	4
