= 1981 Cronulla-Sutherland Sharks season =

- NSWRFL rank: 4th
- 1981 record: Wins: 13; draws: 1; losses: 9
- Points scored: For: 350 (64 tries, 79 goals); against: 351 (70 tries, 68 goals, 5 field goals)

Team information
- Coach: Greg Pierce
- Captain: Steve Rogers
- Stadium: Endeavour Field
- Avg. attendance: 8,439

Top scorers
- Tries: Steve Rogers (14)
- Goals: Steve Rogers (76)
- Points: Steve Rogers (194)
← 1980	1982 →

The 1981 Cronulla-Sutherland Sharks season was the fifteenth in the club's history. They competed in the NSWRFL's 1981 Premiership as well as the 1981 Craven Mild Cup and 1981 Tooth Cup.

== Ladder ==
	Team	Pld	W	D	L	PF	PA	PD	Pts
1	Eastern Suburbs	22	16	0	6	385	225	+160	32
2	Newtown	22	14	2	6	326	268	+58	30
3	Parramatta	22	14	1	7	398	246	+152	29
4	Cronulla-Sutherland	22	13	1	8	339	337	+2	27
5	Manly-Warringah	22	12	2	8	350	317	+33	26
6	Western Suburbs	22	11	1	10	311	352	-41	23
7	North Sydney	22	9	0	13	322	355	-33	18
8	St. George	22	8	1	13	320	399	-79	17
9	South Sydney	22	8	1	13	322	423	-101	17
10	Canterbury-Bankstown	22	8	0	14	340	344	-4	16
11	Penrith	22	8	0	14	305	350	-45	16
12	Balmain	22	6	1	15	293	395	-102	13
