= 1980 Cronulla-Sutherland Sharks season =

- NSWRFL rank: 9th
- 1980 record: Wins: 9; draws: 2; losses: 11
- Points scored: For: 350 (64 tries, 79 goals); against: 346 (54 tries, 91 goals, 2 field goals)

Team information
- Coach: Tommy Bishop
- Captain: Greg Pierce Steve Rogers
- Stadium: Endeavour Field
- Avg. attendance: 7,979

Top scorers
- Tries: Greg Mullane (9)
- Goals: Steve Rogers (47)
- Points: Steve Rogers (112)
← 1979	1981 →

The 1980 Cronulla-Sutherland Sharks season was the fourteenth in the club's history. They competed in the NSWRFL's 1980 Premiership as well as the 1980 Tooth Cup.

== Ladder ==
	Team	Pld	W	D	L	PF	PA	PD	Pts
1	Eastern Suburbs	22	14	2	6	339	249	+90	30
2	Canterbury-Bankstown	22	15	0	7	361	334	+27	30
3	Western Suburbs	22	14	0	8	429	308	+121	28
4	St. George	22	13	2	7	367	321	+46	28
5	South Sydney	22	12	1	9	392	318	+74	25
6	Parramatta	22	11	2	9	420	317	+103	24
7	Manly-Warringah	22	11	2	9	335	354	-19	24
8	Newtown	22	11	1	10	348	357	-9	23
9	Cronulla-Sutherland	22	9	2	11	350	346	+4	20
10	Balmain	22	7	0	15	330	382	-52	14
11	North Sydney	22	6	1	15	282	405	-123	13
12	Penrith	22	2	1	19	294	556	-262	5
