= 1981 Parramatta Eels season =

- NSWRFL Rank: 3rd
- Play-off result: Premiers
- 1981 record: Wins: 14; draws: 1; losses: 7
- Points scored: For: 398; against: 246

Team information
- Coach: (Australia) Jack Gibson
- Captain: (Australia) Steve Edge
- Stadium: Cumberland Oval
- Avg. attendance: 11,330
- High attendance: 18,449 (30 August vs Manly Warringah Sea Eagles, Round 22)

Top scorers
- Tries: (Australia) Steve Ella (14) (Australia) Brett Kenny
- Goals: (Australia) Mick Cronin (82)
- Points: (Australia) Mick Cronin (182)
← 1980	List of seasons	1982 →

The 1981 Parramatta Eels season was the 35th in the club's history. Coached by Jack Gibson and captained by Steve Edge, they competed in the 1981 NSWRFL Premiership.

== Standings ==
1981 NSWRFL season
Pos	Team	Pld	W	D	L	PF	PA	PD	Pts
1	Eastern Suburbs Roosters	22	16	0	6	385	225	+160	32
2	Newtown Jets	22	14	2	6	326	268	+58	30
3	Parramatta Eels	22	14	1	7	398	246	+152	29
4	Cronulla-Sutherland Sharks	22	13	1	8	339	337	+2	27
5	Manly Warringah Sea Eagles	22	12	2	8	350	317	+33	26
6	Western Suburbs Magpies	22	11	1	10	311	352	-41	23
7	North Sydney Bears	22	9	0	13	322	355	-33	18
8	St. George Dragons	22	8	1	13	320	399	-79	17
9	South Sydney Rabbitohs	22	8	1	13	322	423	-101	17
10	Canterbury-Bankstown Bulldogs	22	8	0	14	340	344	-4	16
11	Penrith Panthers	22	8	0	14	305	350	-45	16
12	Balmain Tigers	22	6	1	15	293	395	-102	13
