= 1982 Cronulla-Sutherland Sharks season =

- NSWRFL rank: 8th
- 1982 record: Wins: 13; draws: 1; losses: 12
- Points scored: For: 400 (76 tries, 85 goals, 2 field goals); against: 336 (67 tries, 67 goals, 1 field goal)

Team information
- Coach: Greg Pierce
- Captain: Steve Rogers Dane Sorensen
- Stadium: Endeavour Field
- Avg. attendance: 6,397

Top scorers
- Tries: Kurt Sorensen (11)
- Goals: Steve Rogers (79)
- Points: Steve Rogers (187)
← 1981	1983 →

The 1982 Cronulla-Sutherland Sharks season was the sixteenth in the club's history. Coached by Greg Pierce and captained by Steve Rogers and Dane Sorensen, they competed in the NSWRFL's 1982 Winfield Cup premiership, finishing the regular season 8th (out of 14) and failing to reach the finals. The Sharks also competed in the 1982 KB Cup.

Rogers was Cronulla-Sutherland's only player selected for representative football, Rogers was Cronulla-Sutherland's only representative player, playing for New South Wales and Australia in 1982 of Great Britain and France.

== Ladder ==
	Team	Pld	W	D	L	PF	PA	PD	Pts
1	Parramatta	26	21	0	5	619	242	+377	42
2	Manly-Warringah	26	17	0	9	530	411	+119	34
3	North Sydney	26	16	1	9	399	360	+39	33
4	Eastern Suburbs	26	15	2	9	437	304	+133	32
5	Western Suburbs	26	16	0	10	412	349	+63	32
6	South Sydney	26	14	1	11	395	400	-5	29
7	Newtown	26	13	2	11	406	309	+97	28
8	Cronulla-Sutherland	26	13	1	12	400	336	+64	27
9	Canterbury-Bankstown	26	12	3	11	399	361	+38	27
10	St. George	26	11	2	13	408	402	+6	24
11	Balmain	26	10	1	15	383	427	-44	21
12	Penrith	26	7	1	18	375	441	-66	15
13	Illawarra	26	6	0	20	344	572	-228	12
14	Canberra	26	4	0	22	269	862	-593	8
