= 1981 Eastern Suburbs Roosters season =

← 1980	1982 →

The 1981 Eastern Suburbs Roosters season was the 74th in the club's history. Coached by Bob Fulton and captained by Royce Ayliffe, they played in the pre-season 1981 Craven Mild Cup, which they won and also in the 1981 Tooth Cup. The Roosters competed in the NSWRFL's 1981 premiership, finishing the regular season 1st (out of 12) to claim the minor premiership. They then came within one match of the grand final but were knocked out by the Newtown Jets.

== Season details ==
Home Ground: Sydney Sports Ground Coach: Bob Fulton Lineup:

- Royce Ayliffe (c)
- Ian Barkley
- Kerry Boustead
- Dave Brown
- Noel Cleal
- Terry Fahey
- Jeff Fisher
- Bruce Foye
- Ron Giteau
- Marty Gurr
- John Harvey
- Kevin Hastings
- Robert 'Rockie' Laurie
- Jeff Masterman
- Paul McCabe
- David Michael
- Terry Murphy

== Season Highlights ==
Eastern Suburbs finished the Premiership season as minor premiers and won the rich Pre Season Cup. Kevin Hastings won Rugby League's major award, the Rothmans Medal, as well as winning the popular media award 'Rugby League Week's' player of the year.

Representatives:- Royce Ayliffe(Aus), Kerry Boustead(Aus), Paul McCabe(Aus), Jeff Masterman(Aus)
