= Craig Ellis =

Craig Ellis may refer to:

- Craig Ellis (Australian rules footballer)
- Craig Ellis (rugby league)
- Craig Ellis (gridiron football)
- Craig Ellis, drummer with Tygers of Pan Tang
