= Geoff Bugden =

Australian rugby league footballer

Personal information
- Full name: Geoff Bugden
- Born: 6 September 1960 (age 65) Newtown, New South Wales, Australia

Playing information
- Height: 185 cm (6 ft 1 in)
- Weight: 101 kg (15 st 13 lb)
- Position: Prop
Club
Years	Team	Pld	T	G	FG	P
1979–81	Newtown Jets	46	7	0	0	21
1982–89	Parramatta Eels	100	6	0	0	21
	Total	146	13	0	0	42
Representative
Years	Team	Pld	T	G	FG	P
1983	New South Wales	2	0	0	0	0
1983	NSW City	1	0	0	0	0
- Relatives: Mark Bugden (brother)

Geoff Bugden (born 6 September 1960) is an Australian former professional rugby league footballer who played in the 1970s and 1980s. He played for Newtown and the Parramatta Eels in the Australian New South Wales Rugby League competition. He won two premierships with the Eels and he primarily played in the front-row. Bugden is of Aboriginal descent through his mother, who is a Kamilaroi woman.

== Playing career ==
A Newtown junior, by 1979 Bugden had progressed to first grade. He was the first ever prop to win the NSW Rugby League's best and fairest player award, the Rothmans Medal, in 1980. Bugden was a reserve for the Newtown Jets side that lost the 1981 Grand Final against the Parramatta Eels. The next year, 1982, Geoff Bugden changed clubs and returned to the Sydney Cricket Ground playing for Parramatta in their Grand Final win over Manly-Warringah Sea Eagles. Bugden was selected to represent New South Wales for games I and III of the 1983 State of Origin series. A serious injury to his chest in 1983 forced Bugden to announce his premature retirement from the game but two years later, he was back for Parramatta only to break his arm. In 1986 Bugden was on the field once more and was part of the Eels' 1986 Grand Final win over the Canterbury-Bankstown Bulldogs, in which he played against his brother Mark and earned himself five-minutes in the sin-bin for tackling Steve Mortimer without the ball.

After a long career that was often curtailed by serious injury, Bugden did not start any of the last thirteen games of 1989 but intended to stay with the Eels for the 1990 season. However, major ankle surgery in early March made it clear he would not be able to play the first half of that season, and when Parramatta became embroiled in a salary cap dispute over the contracts of Peter Sterling and Mark Laurie, Budgen was sacked by the Eels alongside Paul Taylor, Michael Moseley, Mark Robinson and Jeremy Ticehurst. Bugden was not wanted by any other Winfield Cup club and retired almost immediately.
