= 1983 Cronulla-Sutherland Sharks season =

- NSWRFL rank: 9th
- 1983 record: Wins: 12; draws: 0; losses: 14
- Points scored: For: 450 (77 tries, 70 goals, 2 field goals); against: 520 (85 tries, 88 goals, 4 field goals)

Team information
- Coach: Terry Fearnley
- Captain: Gavin Miller
- Stadium: Endeavour Field
- Avg. attendance: 4,014

Top scorers
- Tries: Chris Gardner (17)
- Goals: Dane Sorensen (48)
- Points: Dane Sorensen (104)
← 1982	1984 →

The 1983 Cronulla-Sutherland Sharks season was the seventeenth in the club's history. The club, coached by Terry Fearnley and captained by Gavin Miller, competed in the NSWRFL's 1983 Winfield Cup premiership. After finishing the regular season 9th (out of 14), the Sharks failed to reach the finals for the second consecutive year. The club also competed in the 1983 KB Cup, reaching the final.

Miller was the only Sharks player selected for representative football this season, playing for New South Wales in the 1983 State of Origin series.

== Ladder ==
	Team	Pld	W	D	L	PF	PA	PD	Pts
1	Manly-Warringah	26	22	0	4	690	361	+329	44
2	Parramatta	26	18	0	8	639	293	+346	36
3	Canterbury-Bankstown	26	18	0	8	531	409	+122	36
4	Balmain	26	17	0	9	525	438	+87	34
5	St. George	26	14	1	11	551	450	+101	29
6	Eastern Suburbs	26	14	1	11	579	492	+87	29
7	North Sydney	26	13	1	12	435	446	-11	27
8	South Sydney	26	12	1	13	439	495	-56	25
9	Cronulla-Sutherland	26	12	0	14	450	520	-70	24
10	Canberra	26	9	0	17	495	614	-119	18
11	Penrith	26	9	0	17	476	647	-171	18
12	Illawarra	26	8	0	18	451	644	-193	16
13	Newtown	26	7	2	17	373	591	-218	16
14	Western Suburbs	26	5	2	19	394	628	-234	12
