= Jean-Claude Marty =

France international rugby league player (1943–2023)

Personal information
- Born: 8 August 1943 Carcassonne, German-occupied France
- Died: 17 January 2023 (aged 79) Castres, France

Playing information
- Position: Wing
Club
Years	Team	Pld	T	G	FG	P
	FC Lézignan XIII
	Racing Club Albi XIII
	FC Lézignan XIII
	Castres Knights
	Total	0	0	0	0	0
Representative
Years	Team	Pld	T	G	FG	P
1965–74	France	13				9

Jean-Claude Marty (8 August 1943 – 17 January 2023) was a French rugby league player who played as a winger.

Marty played for FC Lézignan XIII, with whom he won the Coupe de France Lord Derby in 1966 and 1970 and Racing Club Albi XIII, with whom he won again in 1974. He played in 13 games for the French national team from 1965 to 1974.
