= Kevin Hastings =

Australian rugby league footballer (born 1957)

Personal information
- Born: 5 January 1957 (age 69) Surry Hills, New South Wales, Australia

Playing information
- Position: Halfback, lock, hooker
Club
Years	Team	Pld	T	G	FG	P
1976–87	Eastern Suburbs	239	49	55	17	281
1986–87	Barrow	23	1	0	2	6
	Total	262	50	55	19	287
Representative
Years	Team	Pld	T	G	FG	P
1981–83	City Seconds	2	0	0	0	0
1983	New South Wales	1	0	0	0	0
- Relatives: Jackson Hastings (son)

Kevin "Horrie" Hastings (born 5 January 1957) is an Australian former professional rugby league footballer who played as a halfback, hooker and lock during the 1970s and 1980s.

Hastings played for the Eastern Suburbs in the New South Wales Rugby League (NSWRL), making 239 appearances for the club from his debut 1976 until his last match in 1987. He has been described as a stalwart of the club, and has won numerous individual accolades, including the Rothmans Medal (1981) and was Dally M Halfback of the Year for three consecutive years (1980, 1981 and 1982). He also played for the English side Barrow during 1986–87.

== Early life ==
Hastings was born in the Sydney suburb of Surry Hills. A student of Our Lady of Mount Carmel primary school in Waterloo, he first played rugby league when his school side was coached by a Sister of Mercy, Sr Gabrielle Flood RSM, of Waterloo.

== Career ==
Coach Jack Gibson placed Hastings into first grade in 1976 when he was 19. He went on to have a distinguished career with Easts that lasted 12 seasons and he played in the 1980 grand final against Canterbury-Bankstown.

He held the distinct honour of being the first player to appear in 200 first grade games for the club and held the record for the number of first grade games for Easts at 228 until broken by Luke Ricketson in 2002.

Throughout his first grade career, Hastings received every major individual award of the 1980s, but was constantly overlooked for rep selection, making one appearance for New South Wales as a reserve in 1983, despite his impressive performance when brought on to the field, this would remain his only appearance for New South Wales.

Hastings received the name 'Horrie' from Bob O'Reilly who gave players nicknames that started with the same initial as the surname.

The Kevin Hastings Stand, at the Sydney Football Stadium, which was the home ground for the Sydney Roosters before its demolition, was named in his honour. Hastings was on hand at the Sydney Football Stadium to see his son Jackson make his first grade début for the Sydney Roosters in 2014.

== Personal life ==
His son is halfback Jackson Hastings who also played for the Roosters and is a current Great Britain international. From his first marriage to Catherine Jones, he is the father to Margaret, Christopher and Robert Hastings. He is currently married to American Lynn Hastings.

Hastings continues his passion for sport as a personal fitness trainer. He specialises in functional training and motivating individuals with varying fitness levels, from beginners to competitive athletes.

== Honours ==
Individual

- Amco Cup player of the series: 1979
- Rugby League Week Player of the Year: 1980, 1981 and 1982
- Rothmans Medal: 1981
- Dally M Halfback of the Year: 1980, 1981 and 1982
