= Paul Taylor (rugby league) =

Australian rugby league footballer

Personal information
- Full name: Paul Taylor
- Born: 26 July 1959 (age 67)

Playing information
- Position: Stand-off, Loose forward
Club
| Years | Team | Pld | T | G | FG | P |
|---|---|---|---|---|---|---|
| 1981–89 | Parramatta Eels | 157 | 30 | 0 | 6 | 116 |
| 1984–85 | Oldham | 23 | 10 | 0 | 2 | 44 |
| 1988–89 | Oldham | 9 | 1 | 0 | 0 | 4 |
| 1989–90 | Wakefield Trinity | 1 | 0 | 0 | 0 | 0 |
| 1990 | Penrith Panthers | 3 | 1 | 0 | 1 | 5 |
| | Total | 193 | 42 | 0 | 9 | 169 |

Paul Taylor (born 26 July 1959) is an Australian former professional rugby league footballer who played in the 1980s and 1990s. He played at club level for Parramatta Eels for nine seasons between 1981 and 1989, Oldham (two spells) in 1984 and 1989, Wakefield Trinity in 1989–90, and Penrith Panthers in 1990 before retiring. He played as a fullback, five-eighth, halfback, hooker, second-row, or lock.

== Playing career ==
Taylor played in four grand finals for Parramatta Eels including three winning premiership teams in 1982, 1983 and 1986. He was also listed as a reserve in Parramatta's first grand final win in 1981. Taylor was the favoured fullback during the Jack Gibson era at Parramatta and played a total of 150 first grade games with the club.

In 2013, Taylor spoke to the media about his time at Parramatta saying "I always thought I was under par in talent compared to the other blokes but I had endurance, So I had to work out how to fit in once I got in there, and that meant looking at the speed and ability of the side and working out what I could bring to the table. I just tried to be the fittest bloke at the club, and in the end it worked out well".

In a brilliant club career, two highlights include (1) in a club game during the 1981 season, Paul Taylor made an astonishing 52 tackles in a match, and (2) during the 1988 season he equaled a club record by scoring 4 tries in a match against Canberra Raiders. He was not selected as a representative player during his career.

After a bitter dispute with Parramatta during the 1989 off season, Taylor moved to the Penrith Panthers. He only played 3 games for the Panthers in 1990 before a broken collarbone ended his career.

== Post playing ==
Taylor later coached at the club level for Central Coast

In 1996, Taylor was made a life member of the Parramatta Eels. In 2022, it was revealed that at one point Taylor was homeless after his rugby league career ended. It was reported that Taylor survived on $1 hashbrowns from McDonalds and stolen tea bags. Taylor spoke of his predicament at the time saying “It was s*** what happened and I never expected it. You sit in the park nearly all day. I probably wore the same clothes for a whole week".
