= Rothmans Medal =

Australian rugby league medal

- Awarded for: The best and fairest player in the New South Wales Rugby League and the Brisbane Rugby League
- Country: Australia

History
- First award: 1968 (Rothmans Medal); 1997 (Provan-Summons Medal)
- Final award: 1997

The Rothmans Medal was the premier individual award in the New South Wales Rugby League and Brisbane Rugby League competitions, and later in the Australian Rugby League, which was given to the player voted by referees as the best and fairest in those competitions for the season, first awarded in 1968. With the establishment of the National Rugby League in 1998, the Rothmans Medal was replaced by the Dally M Medal as the official Player of the Year award.

== History ==
The Rothmans Medal was the first official player-of-the-year award to be established in rugby league in Australia. The medal was sponsored by Rothmans International, a tobacco production company. There were two Rothmans Medals awarded each year: one for the best player in the New South Wales Rugby League, and one for the best player in the Brisbane Rugby League.

The voting for the Rothmans Medal was done by the match-day referee. After each match, he awarded three votes to the best player, two votes to the second-best player, and one vote to the third-best player. This is the same basic format as the modern day Dally M, except that the votes are now determined by the media.

The two Rothmans Medals were first awarded in 1968, and were awarded each year until 1996. In 1997, the Rothmans Medal in New South Wales became known as the Provan-Summons medal, because all tobacco advertising and sponsorship was prohibited in Australia in 1992, under the Tobacco Advertising Prohibition Act 1992; the medal then disappeared altogether in 1998 with the merger of the Australian Rugby League and the Australian Super League. The Queensland Rothmans Medal was also last awarded in 1996, as the Queensland Cup superseded the Brisbane Rugby League as Queensland's premier rugby league competition in 1997.

== Rothmans Medal winners ==
=== New South Wales ===
Note: includes Provan-Summons Medal winner in 1997.

Year	Winner	Position	Team
1968	Terry Hughes	Halfback	Cronulla
1969	Denis Pittard	Five-eighth	South Sydney
1970	Kevin Junee	Halfback	Eastern Suburbs
1971	Denis Pittard	Five-eighth	South Sydney
1972	Tommy Raudonikis	Halfback	Western Suburbs
1973	Ken Maddison	Second-row	Cronulla
1974	Graham Eadie	Fullback	Manly-Warringah
1975	Steve Rogers	Centre	Cronulla
1976	Ray Higgs	Second-row	Parramatta
1977	Mick Cronin	Centre	Parramatta
1978	Mick Cronin	Centre	Parramatta
1979	Ray Price	Lock	Parramatta
1980	Geoff Bugden	Prop	Newtown
1981	Kevin Hastings	Halfback	Eastern Suburbs
1982	Greg Brentnall	Fullback	Canterbury
1983	Michael Eden	Five-eighth	Eastern Suburbs
1984	Terry Lamb	Five-eighth	Canterbury
1985	Wayne Pearce	Lock	Balmain
1986	Mal Cochrane	Hooker	Manly-Warringah
1987	Peter Sterling	Halfback	Parramatta
1988	Barry Russell	Halfback	Cronulla
1989	Gavin Miller; Mark Sargent	Second-row; Prop	Cronulla; Newcastle
1990	Peter Sterling	Halfback	Parramatta
1991	Ewan McGrady	Halfback, Fullback	Canterbury
1992	Allan Langer	Halfback	Brisbane
1993	Ricky Stuart	Halfback	Canberra
1994	David Fairleigh	Second-row	North Sydney
1995	Paul Green	Halfback	Cronulla
1996	Jason Taylor	Halfback	North Sydney
1997	Brad Fittler	Five-eighth	Sydney Roosters

=== Queensland ===
Year	Winner	Position	Team
1968	Wayne Head	Fullback	Western Suburbs
1969	Johnny Brown	Halfback	Northern Suburbs
1970	Graeme Atherton	Five-eighth	Southern Suburbs
1971	Len Brunner	Second-row	Wynnum-Manly
1972	Marty Scanlan	Five-eighth	Valleys
1973	John Eales	Centre	Eastern Suburbs
1974	Jeff Fyfe	Lock	Eastern Suburbs
1975	Steve Calder	Lock	Northern Suburbs
1976	Darryl Brohman	Prop	Northern Suburbs
1977	Alan Currie	Lock	Eastern Suburbs
1978	Ian Pearce	Fullback	Redcliffe
1979	Neville Draper	Lock	Northern Suburbs
1980	Tony Obst	Lock	Redcliffe
1981	Chris Phelan	Lock	Southern Suburbs
1982	Tony Currie	Fullback, Centre	Western Suburbs
1983	Trevor Paterson	Second-row	Eastern Suburbs
1984	Cavill Heugh	Prop	Eastern Suburbs
1985	Ian French	Second-row	Wynnum-Manly
1986	Bryan Niebling	Second-row, Prop	Redcliffe
1986	Scott Tronc	Second-row, Prop	Southern Suburbs
1987	Gene Miles	Centre	Wynnum-Manly
1988	Kevin Langer	Halfback	Western Suburbs
1989	Neil Tierney	Prop	Wynnum-Manly
1990	Trevor Benson	Centre, Five-eighth	Redcliffe
1991	Darryl Duncan	Five-eighth	Northern Suburbs
1992	Jason Hanrahan	Prop	Southern Suburbs
1993	Paul Green	Halfback	Eastern Suburbs
1993	Steve Mills		Western Suburbs
1994	Steve Bryant	Prop	Brothers
1995	Graham Cotter	Prop	Redcliffe
1996	Alan Wieland	Lock, Second-row	Western Suburbs
