= Castres XIII Rugby League Knights =

French semi-professional rugby league club

Club information
- Full name: Castres XIII Rugby League Knights
- Nickname(s): Knights
- Founded: 2013; 12 years ago

Current details
- Chairman: Nicolas Girou
- Competition: National Division 2 (Midi-Pyrenees Region)
- 2015/16: 8th

Uniforms
Home colours

Castres XIII Rugby League Knights is a French rugby league club based in Castres, within the French region of Tarn, Occitania. Established in 2013, the club competed in the National Division 2 Midi-Pyrenees regional league.

== History ==
The club was established in 2013 with the aim of introducing rugby league to the local area, particularly focusing on school children. The club operates junior as well as ladies' teams.

In 2022 and 2023, the club struggled to find volunteers to run training sessions. In July 2023, it was announced that if attempts to revive the club were unsuccessful the management team would dissolve the club.
