= Steve Edge (rugby league) =

Australian rugby league footballer

Personal information
- Full name: Steven Edge
- Born: 2 October 1951 (age 74) Kogarah, New South Wales, Australia
- Height: 175 cm (5 ft 9 in)
- Weight: 79.4 kg (12 st 7 lb)

Playing information
- Position: Hooker
Club
Years	Team	Pld	T	G	FG	P
1973–79	St. George Dragons	103	15	0	0	45
1980–84	Parramatta Eels	118	19	0	0	61
	Total	221	34	0	0	106
Representative
Years	Team	Pld	T	G	FG	P
1976	Combined Sydney
1980	New South Wales	1	0	0	0	0

Steven Edge (born 2 October 1951) is an Australian former rugby league footballer who played in the 1970s and 1980s. A New South Wales representative hooker he captained the St. George Dragons' to their 14th premiership, played in their 15th premiership, and captained the Parramatta Eels to their 1st, 2nd and 3rd premierships.

One of the most successful captains under the limited tackle rule, Steve Edge played in a remarkable eleven grand finals in all grades during his career. He holds a unique record in Australian rugby league history as the only man to captain two clubs to Grand Final premiership success.

== Club career ==
St George Dragons

Steve Edge was graded with the St George Dragons in 1972 and that year played in the club's premiership winning third grade side.

He became a regular first grader from 1974 and played in the 1975 Grand Final side that lost to the Eastern Suburbs Roosters. Edge captained the 1977 Dragons' side, playing in the historic 1977 drawn Grand Final and subsequent replay victory the following week. Edge battled for his first grade spot in 1978 and 1979 but found his best form to play in Saints' 1979 Grand Final winning side captained by Craig Young.

Parramatta Eels

In 1980 Edge signed with the Parramatta Eels under coach Jack Gibson and captained the Eels to three consecutive Grand Final wins from 1981 to 1983. Edge was regarded as a fine on-field leader, never an overly flashy player with the ball. He had to overcome a serious eye injury (detached retina and punctured iris) to take his place in the 1984 Grand Final and retired after his club's narrow 6–4 loss to the Canterbury Bulldogs. In 1993, Edge was made a life member of the Parramatta club. In 2002, Edge was inducted into Parramatta's hall of fame.

== Representative career ==
Edge toured New Zealand with a Combined Sydney side in 1976. He was selected to play Hooker for New South Wales in the inaugural Rugby League State of Origin match in 1980.
