= Michael Pitman (rugby league) =

Australian rugby league footballer

Personal information
- Full name: Michael Pitman
- Born: Sydney, New South Wales, Australia

Playing information
- Position: Second-row, Lock
Club
Years	Team	Pld	T	G	FG	P
1980–82	Newtown Jets	61	8	0	0	24
1983	Canterbury Bulldogs	19	0	0	0	0
	Total	80	8	0	0	24
- Source: As of 4 June 2019

Michael Pitman is an Australian former rugby league footballer who played in the 1980s. He played for the Newtown Jets and Canterbury-Bankstown in the New South Wales Rugby League (NSWRL) competition.

== Background ==
Pitman was born in Sydney, New South Wales, Australia and is the son of Tom Pitman who played for Newtown in the 1940s and 1950s.

== Playing career ==
Pitman made his first grade debut for Newtown in Round 1 1980 against Canterbury-Bankstown at Henson Park in which Pitman was sent from the field for a professional foul. Under the coaching of Warren Ryan, Newtown went from a struggling team to title contenders and in 1981 finished second on the table. Newtown would go on to reach the 1981 NSWRL grand final against Parramatta. Pitman played at prop in the match as Newtown trailed Parramatta 7–6 at halftime before Parramatta came home in the second half to win 20-11 and claim their first premiership at the Sydney Cricket Ground.

The following season, Newtown were unable to replicate their form of 1981 and the club failed to reach the finals. In Round 5 of the 1982 season, Pitman was in the Newtown side which played in the lowest scoring game in NSWRL premiership history as they drew 0–0 with Canterbury at Henson Park. Pitman then departed Newtown at the end of 1982 and signed with Canterbury. Pitman played one season for Canterbury making 19 appearances and was part of the side which reached the 1983 preliminary final but lost to Parramatta 18–4.

Pitman then signed on with Lakes United in the Newcastle competition as captain-coach. Pitman later coached Griffith black and whites, now known as Griffith black and whites panthers. After leaving Canterbury in 1984 he captained/coached Kurri Kurri Bulldogs.
