= Chris Gardner (rugby league) =

Australian rugby league footballer

Personal information
- Full name: Christopher John Gardner
- Born: 19 October 1955 (age 70) Sydney, New South Wales, Australia

Playing information
- Position: Wing, Centre
Club
Years	Team	Pld	T	G	FG	P
1978–85	Cronulla-Sutherland	128	44	13	0	154

Coaching information
Club
Years	Team	Gms	W	D	L	W%
2011	Bramley Buffaloes	0	0	0	0
- Source: As of 13 April 2019

Chris Gardner nicknamed "Stan" (born 19 October 1955) is an Australian former rugby league footballer who played in the 1970s and 1980s. He played for Cronulla-Sutherland in the New South Wales Rugby League (NSWRL) competition.

== Playing career ==
Gardner made his first grade debut for Cronulla in Round 3 1978 against the Parramatta Eels at Cumberland Oval. In 1978, Cronulla finished 2nd on the table and qualified for the finals. Cronulla defeated Manly in the opening week of the finals series 17-12. Cronulla then defeated minor premiers Western Suburbs to reach their second grand final against Manly.

After just 4 games in first grade, Gardner was selected to play in the 1978 NSWRL grand replay to replace Mick Mullane Jr. who was injured in the first final. Just 3 days earlier, Manly and Cronulla played out an 11-11 draw and were required to return and play again on a Tuesday afternoon. Both Manly and Cronulla went into the replay with tired players but it was Manly who prevailed in the replay 16-0 winning their fourth premiership in front of a low crowd of 33,552.

In 1979, Cronulla reached the minor semi-final against Canterbury-Bankstown but were defeated 30-15 with Gardner playing at centre. In 1981, Cronulla again reached the finals but once again Manly proved to be their nemesis defeating them 14-11 in the minor preliminary final. In 1983, Gardner finished equal top try scorer in the competition with 17 tries, but Cronulla finished a disappointing 9th on the table. Gardner retired at the end of the 1985 season scoring a total of 44 tries in 128 games.

== Coaching ==
Chris was briefly head-coach of Bramley Buffaloes in April 2011.

Sporting positions
Preceded by Peter Roe; 2011	Coach Bramley Buffaloes; 2011	Succeeded by Craig Lingard; 2012
