= Colin Clarke (rugby league) =

English RL coach and former GB international rugby league footballer

Personal information
- Born: 28 June 1945 (age 80) Wigan, England

Playing information
- Position: Hooker
Club
Years	Team	Pld	T	G	FG	P
1962–76	Wigan	417	74	0	0	222
1976	Salford	12	0	0	0	0
1977–78	Wigan	19	1	0	0	3
1978–79	Leigh	3	0	0	0	0
	Total	451	75	0	0	225
Representative
Years	Team	Pld	T	G	FG	P
1965–71	Lancashire	3	0	0	0	0
1965–73	Great Britain	7	2	0	0	6

Coaching information
Club
Years	Team	Gms	W	D	L	W%
1980–82	Leigh
1984–86	Wigan
	Total	0	0	0	0
- Relatives: Phil Clarke (son)

Colin Clarke is an English former professional rugby league player and coach who played as a hooker in the 1960s and 1970s, and coached in the 1980s. He played for Wigan (two spells), Salford and Leigh, and won 7 international caps for Great Britain.

He coached Wigan from 1984 to 1986, winning the 1985 Challenge Cup, Wigan's first for 20 years. He was inducted into the Wigan Hall of Fame in 2016.

== Playing career ==
=== Wigan ===
Clarke joined Wigan at the age of 17 from Orrell rugby union club, making his debut in 1963.

Clarke played in Wigan's 20–16 victory over Hunslet in the 1965 Challenge Cup final during the 1964–65 season at Wembley Stadium, London on Saturday 8 May 1965, in front of a crowd of 89,016. Wigan returned to Wembley the following year in the 1966 Challenge Cup, but Clarke missed the final due to suspension.

He played and scored a try in Wigan's 16–13 victory over Oldham in the 1966 Lancashire Cup final during the 1966–67 season at Station Road, Swinton, on Saturday 29 October 1966.

Clarke played in Wigan's 7–4 victory over St. Helens in the 1968 BBC2 Floodlit Trophy final during the 1968–69 season at Central Park, Wigan on Tuesday 17 December 1968, and played hooker in the 6–11 defeat by Leigh in the 1969 BBC2 Floodlit Trophy final during the 1969–70 season at Central Park, Wigan on Tuesday 16 December 1969.

He played in the 15–8 victory over Widnes in the 1971 Lancashire County Cup final during the 1971–72 season at Knowsley Road on Saturday 28 August 1971, and played in the 19–9 victory over Salford in the 1973 Lancashire Cup final during the 1973–74 season at Wilderspool Stadium, Warrington, on Saturday 13 October 1973.

Clarke's testimonial match at Wigan took place in 1973.

=== Great Britain ===
Clarke won seven international caps for Great Britain while at Wigan. He played in 1965 against New Zealand, in 1966 against France, and New Zealand, in 1967 against France, and in 1973 against Australia (3 matches).

== Coaching ==
Clarke coached Wigan from 1984 to 1986, including in the 1985 Challenge Cup Final, Wigan's first Challenge Cup win since 1965.

== Family ==
Clarke is the father of Phil Clarke, the rugby league player who played in the 1980s and 1990s. His other son Andrew Clarke is a player agent.
