= Jim Walters =

Australian rugby league footballer

Personal information
- Full name: James Walters
- Born: 4 October 1958 (age 68) Sydney, New South Wales, Australia

Playing information
- Position: Hooker, Second-row
Club
Years	Team	Pld	T	G	FG	P
1977–82	Newtown Jets	37	8	0	0	24
- Source: As of 4 June 2019

Jim Walters is an Australian former rugby league footballer who played in the 1970s and 1980s. He played for the Newtown Jets in the New South Wales Rugby League (NSWRL) competition.

== Playing career ==
Walters made his first grade debut for Newtown in Round 20 1977 against Balmain at Henson Park scoring a try in a 43–12 defeat. Walters made 2 further appearances for Newtown as the club finished last on the table and claimed the wooden spoon. The following year did not get any better for Newtown as they again finished last on the table.

From 1979 onwards under the coaching of Warren Ryan, Newtown went from a struggling team to title contenders and in 1981 finished second on the table. Newtown would go on to reach the 1981 NSWRL grand final against Parramatta. Walters played in the match as Newtown trailed Parramatta 7–6 at halftime before Parramatta came home in the second half to win 20-11 and claim their first premiership at the Sydney Cricket Ground.

Walters played one further season before retiring at the end of 1982.
