= Paul Morris (rugby league, born 1962) =

Australian rugby league footballer

Personal information
- Born: 8 September 1962 (age 62)

Playing information
- Position: Five-eighth
Club
Years	Team	Pld	T	G	FG	P
1980	Balmain Tigers	2	0	0	0	0
1981–83	Newtown Jets	18	2	13	0	32
1984–85	St. George Dragons	18	1	0	0	4
	Total	38	3	13	0	36
- Source: RLP

Paul Morris (born 8 September 1962) is an Australian former professional rugby league footballer who played for the Balmain Tigers, Newtown Jets and the St. George Dragons in Sydney's NSWRFL competition in the 1980s.

A five-eighth, Morris grew up in the Sydney suburb of Ermington and started his NSWRFL career at Balmain, where he played two first-grade games in 1980.

Morris switched to Newtown in 1981 and got his opportunity in first-grade late in the season, forming a partnership with Tommy Raudonikis in the halves. Throughout the 1981 finals series he remained Newtown's five-eighth, which included the grand final loss to Parramatta, in which he also served as goal-kicker.

When Newtown folded he finished his NSWRL career with two seasons at St. George in 1984 and 1985, making a total of 18 appearances in first-grade.
