= Craig Ellis (rugby league) =

Australian rugby league footballer

Personal information
- Full name: Craig Ellis
- Born: 26 October 1958 (age 66); Sydney, New South Wales, Australia

Playing information
- Position: Second-row, Prop
Club
Years	Team	Pld	T	G	FG	P
1978–83	Newtown	82	7	0	0	23
1984–87	Western Suburbs	23	2	0	0	8
	Total	105	9	0	0	31
- Source: Whiticker/Hudson

Craig Ellis is an Australian former rugby league footballer who played as a second-row or prop in the 1970s and 1980s. Ellis played for Newtown and Western Suburbs in the NSWRL competition.

== Playing career ==
Ellis began his career with Newtown in 1978 making his debut in Round 18 against Cronulla which ended in a 44–0 defeat. Newtown went on to finish last that year winning only 2 games all season. In 1979, Newtown brought in Warren Ryan as the new coach of the club and he transformed the team from easy beats to a competitive side. In 1981, Newtown qualified for their first grand final in 26 years as they played against Parramatta. Ellis made 14 appearances that year including the grand final itself. Newtown went into the second half of the match holding a shock lead until Parramatta stormed home to win their first premiership 20–10.

Ellis played with Newtown for a further two seasons but missed out on playing in the club's final ever first grade game against Canberra. It was decided at the end of 1983 that Newtown along with Western Suburbs were to be expelled from the competition by the authority of the NSWRL board. In the coming months, Western Suburbs took the NSWRL to court and won their case to be reinstated. Newtown lacked the financial resources to challenge the decision and were omitted from the 1984 season.

In 1984, Ellis joined Western Suburbs as the club finished last on the table. In the four years Ellis spent at Western Suburbs the club finished second last twice and finished bottom of the table in 1987. Ellis final game in first grade was a 24–12 loss to Illawarra.
