= Jack Gibson (rugby league) =

Australian RL coach and former rugby league footballer

Personal information
- Full name: John Arthur Gibson
- Born: 27 February 1929 Kiama, New South Wales, Australia
- Died: 9 May 2008 (aged 79) Waterfall, New South Wales, Australia

Playing information
- Height: 6 ft 2 in (188 cm)
- Weight: 89 kg (14 st 0 lb)
- Position: Prop
Club
Years	Team	Pld	T	G	FG	P
1953–61	Eastern Suburbs	123	26	0	0	78
1962	Newtown Jets	12	4	0	0	12
1963–65	Western Suburbs	19	1	0	0	3
	Total	154	31	0	0	93
Representative
Years	Team	Pld	T	G	FG	P
1954	New South Wales	1	0	0	0	0

Coaching information
Club
Years	Team	Gms	W	D	L	W%
1967–68	Eastern Suburbs	46	27	3	16	59
1970–71	St George	49	33	1	15	67
1973	Newtown Jets	26	16	1	9	62
1974–76	Eastern Suburbs	73	56	1	16	77
1978–79	South Sydney	44	21	1	22	48
1981–83	Parramatta Eels	84	61	1	22	73
1985–87	Cronulla	72	31	1	39	43
	Total	394	245	9	139	62
Representative
Years	Team	Gms	W	D	L	W%
1989–90	New South Wales	6	2	0	4	33
1989–90	City Origin	2	2	0	0	100

John Arthur Gibson OAM (born 1929 –2008), nicknamed 'Supercoach' was an Australian rugby league coach, player, and commentator.

== History ==
He was born in Kiama, New South Wales of Scottish descent. Gibson's family relocated to Sydney in his youth. He played third-grade rugby league at St George in 1950 before joining a social side in the Eastern Suburbs A-grade competition called Taylor's Celebrity Club. Gibson worked as a bouncer for Joe Taylor at the sly drinking and gambling outlet Thommo's Two-Up School, as well as other Sydney nightclubs that Taylor owned. Gibson also fought as an amateur for the NSW boxing title.

== Playing career ==
=== Roosters ===
Gibson was graded with Eastern Suburbs in 1953. He debuted in first grade and represented for New South Wales that same year. In 1954, he also represented for Sydney but spent the second half of the season in the country at Grenfell, New South Wales following some work troubles. He returned to St George Dragons in 1957, and played in the third grade grand final.

Returning to Easts in 1955 Gibson went on to play 152 first grade games for the club primarily at prop or second-row. He made a further Sydney representative appearance in 1958 and captained the Roosters in the 1960 Grand final loss to St George. He left Easts at the end of 1961.

=== Newtown & Wests ===
Gibson spent the 1962 season with Newtown and was set for retirement until the club put him on open contract at the end of 1962. He was snapped up by Wests, playing out his career in the 1963 and 1964 seasons, including their 1963 Grand Final loss.

Wests 1963 Grand Final loss to St George was perceived as controversial thanks to some perceived biased refereeing by Darcy Lawler. Prior to the game, one Wests player (later named to be Gibson by team captain Arthur Summons) entered the change room at the Sydney Cricket Ground and promptly told his teammates that if they had backed themselves to win they had better lay off their bets because he had been informed by his own SP Bookie that "The ref has backed St George".

During the game, played on an extremely muddy ground thanks to heavy rain and lower grade games that had churned up the cricket pitch area, Lawler had made some questionable decisions against Wests. Just before half time, Wests had a try disallowed. With St George leading 5–3, centre Gil MacDougall had a chance to give Wests the lead when he won a race to the ball and looked to have grounded it for a try, but Lawler ruled that he did not ground it.

Later with 15 minutes to go and the score still favouring Saints 5–3, St George winger Johnny King scored a match winning try with Wests players claiming that King had been tackled and that they believed Lawler had called him to play the ball, only for King to get up and continue his run to the try line with Lawler then awarding the try giving St George an 8–3 win and their third straight Grand Final win over Wests. Both decisions fuelled the debate about Lawler's impartiality on the day. Lawler, who awarded St George the penalties 18–7, retired after the match.

=== Cricketer ===
Gibson also played first-grade cricket for the Waverley club in Sydney, taking 92 wickets as a fast bowler.

== Coaching ==
=== Early coaching years ===
Jack Gibson began his first-grade New South Wales Rugby League coaching career at Eastern Suburbs in 1967. In 1966, Gibson took them to the semi-finals that first year. In 1968, the team finished with a defensive record second only to eventual premiers South Sydney and made the semi-finals, then were knocked out in week one by St George.

Gibson then left Easts to join St George, taking all three grades at the club to the 1971 Grand Final. On leaving the Dragons he linked up with Newtown where he enjoyed immediate success, taking out the Wills Cup pre-season tournament, helping the foundation club to its only club championship and a berth in the preliminary final where they were knocked out by Cronulla. Tellingly, the following year after Gibson had left, the Jets slipped back and finished the season in seventh place.

=== Roosters premierships ===
In the 1973 the high-rolling Eastern Suburbs Leagues Club at Bondi Junction announced a $600,000 profit. The club set about to regain premiership honours that they hadn't seen since 1945, and bought Souths Test hooker Elwyn Walters to add to their experienced forwards in Arthur Beetson and Ron Coote, and made a buy in rugby union international Russell Fairfax to add to their backline. Securing former club-captain and coach Gibson put all the pieces in place.

==== 1974 ====
Easts dominated the 1974 season winning 19 of 22 matches to finish eight points ahead of their nearest rivals. When they were beaten by Canterbury in the major semi-final, Gibson launched a scathing attack on referee Keith Page claiming "if Page has the final I may as well not send a team out." Over the next ten years, Gibson would turn the coaching technique of blaming the referee for his side's losses into an art form.

In the grand final, Eastern Suburbs defeated Canterbury 19-4, giving Gibson his first premiership as a coach and the Roosters their first in 29 years.

==== 1975 ====
In Season 1975, after losing the matches in rounds 2 and 3, the Roosters juggernaut rolled on and they posted 19 consecutive wins to close out the regular season; a streak that ran from round 4 to round 22 and remains the equal record for the most consecutive wins in premiership history with the 2021 Melbourne Storm team. The Roosters dominated St. George on Grand Final day with a punishing seven try haul in the second half and an emphatic 38–0 victory. In addition to the back-to-back premiership titles, Gibson also steered the club that season to victory in the mid-week Amco Cup and to a rightful claim as the best club team in the world in defeating English champions, St Helens R.F.C. in the inaugural World Club Challenge.

By 1976 a number of other clubs, Parramatta and Manly had caught up with the high standards that Gibson had fostered at Easts; the club's dominance ended and he moved to South Sydney. Gibson endured the leanest spell of his career there, failing to get as far as the semi-finals in his two seasons with the club of 1978 and 1979.

=== Parramatta premierships ===
Gibson then linked with Parramatta, leading them to the most successful era in their history taking out three consecutive premierships from 1981 to 1983.

==== 1981 ====
In club Chief-Executive Denis Fitzgerald Gibson found an ally in his remorseless approach to sledging referees and applying pressure via the media. On 5 April 1981, Gibson dared the Referees Appointments Board to give Greg Hartley another Eels match after they lost 12–8 to Canterbury. The following week Gibson sent a personal letter to Kevin Roberts complimenting him for his handling of the Parramatta-Souths match which the Eels won 39–5. Come finals time, Gibson continued to apply pressure when he publicly criticised the appointment of Hartley to control the Eels major semi-final clash with Eastern Suburbs.

The tactic has proved effective – Parramatta beat Easts 12–8 when Hartley awarded Parramatta two vital penalties in extra time which Mick Cronin converted.

In the 1981 NSWRFL Grand Final, Parramatta faced Newtown, which was appearing in its first premiership decider in 26 years. Parramatta, seeking its first premiership title, won the match under coach Jack Gibson, with experienced players including Steve Edge, Ray Price, Ron Hilditch and Bob O'Reilly alongside younger players such as Brett Kenny, Mick Cronin, Peter Sterling, Eric Grothe and Steve Ella. Following the victory, Gibson addressed supporters at Parramatta Leagues Club with remark, "Ding, dong, the witch is dead," referencing the club's long premiership drought. Celebrations later escalated, resulting in a fire that destroyed the grandstand at Cumberland Oval. Parramatta management subsequently issued an official apology to the NSWEFL, regarding the ongoing Gibson-Hartley feud.

==== 1982 ====
Under Gibson the nucleus of that side was kept together and the Eels went on to win the competition in the next two years – season 1982 and season 1983.

Manly were comfortable pre-match favourites for the 1982 Grand Final having demolished Parramatta three times that season including a 20–0 drubbing in a spiteful major semi-final. Gibson, Fitzgerald and lock-forward Ray Price employed the tactic of publicly criticizing referees and in the week leading up the match John Gocher was the target of the pressure. When the Sea-Eagles scored first in the second minute it looked like the game was playing to expectations but things changed from there. Parramatta's forward pack began to dominate Manly's all international six and before half-time Brett Kenny crossed for two tries and set-up another three for Sterling, Ella and Neil Hunt to ensure a second title for the Eels.

Parramatta rebounded from their semi-final loss with a 33-0 victory over Easts in the Preliminary Final. They followed this performance by defeating Manly in the Grand Final the following week.

==== 1983 ====
Claims that the week's rest for winning the major semi-final could work against a side surfaced when Parramatta dismissed Manly 18–6 in the 1983 Grand Final. The Sea-Eagles trailed 12–0 after 29 minutes and didn't score a point until the 45th minute. The champion Eels and their coach Gibson were indisputably at the top of the football tree.

The 1983 title took Gibson's personal Grand Final win tally to five, then sharing with Ken Kearney jointly the title of the most successful coach in Australian premiership history. It would be over twenty years before Brisbane Broncos coach Wayne Bennett, himself a great admirer of Gibson, beat that record with the Broncos' premiership win in National Rugby League season 2006.

=== Cronulla-Sutherland ===
Gibson's last club coaching role was with the Cronulla-Sutherland Sharks from 1985 to 1987. He had few big-name players to work with but did an admirable job in developing a pool of local junior talent and the club eventually made the semi-finals in the two years immediately following his departure.

=== State of Origin ===
Gibson was given the New South Wales Blues to coach in the 1989 State of Origin series. The team had previously lost five successive games and Gibson was brought in along with a number of sweeping player changes. However the new squad did no better and Gibson had to suffer the ignominy of a 3–0 whitewash to a Maroons side coached by his friend and protégé Arthur Beetson. The following year in 1990 he had his revenge when his New South Wales side trumped Beetson's Queenslanders 2–1. Gibson quit while on top, only to take up a role back at the Roosters in 1991 as manager with former Test halfback Mark Murray as coach. He did this until 1994.

=== Coaching influences ===
Gibson studied coaching and training methods in other sports looking for innovations which could be incorporated into his rugby league coaching. In particular, he would often travel to the US to watch NFL teams play and train. Gibson was a fan of legendary Green Bay Packers coach Vince Lombardi and was influenced by Lombardi's coaching and management style.

The Cadigan reference reports that rugby league identity Terry Fearnley first introduced Gibson to the sayings and attitudes of Vince Lombardi via a 1971 sales and motivational film called The Second Effort which contained a Lombardi segment. Gibson's charges at St George had at that stage of the 1971 season won only four of their first eight games. After embracing the film and its messages and showing it to the entire St George playing roster, all three Dragons sides were unbeaten for the next seven weeks; lost just two of the remaining 14 matches; and all three grades of the club made it to their respective Grand finals that year.

He befriended San Francisco 49ers coach Dick Nolan at an NFL annual conference in 1972 and was invited to study and observe the operations of the 49ers team.

=== Coaching innovations ===
- First to use a computer to evaluate player performance including being the first club coach to track and use individual player tackle counts.
- His teams were the first to train with sides from other codes – he trained his team alongside soccer players and used Australian Football specialists as kicking coaches.
- Introduced mascara under the eyes to reduce glare for night games under lights.
- First to use weights-machines such as the Nautilus exercise machines.
- First to use video extensively as a coaching device.
- First to have players' fitness scientifically tested in pre-season with the "pinch test" (skinfold method).
- First to insist upon his own integrated coaching team including co-ordinator (Ron Massey), fitness conditioner (Mick Souter) and injury treatment/rehabilitation (Alf Richards).
- Made the bomb a potent attacking weapon used by both Easts and Parramatta under exponent John Peard.

== Accolades ==
Gibson's esteem in Australian rugby league remained strong throughout his life. Up until he was incapacitated, past players, coaches and journalists still telephoned him for advice or a quote, even though he hadn't been actively involved in game for some time.

In 1988 Gibson was awarded the Medal of the Order of Australia "for service to rugby league as a coach". In 2000 he was awarded the Australian Sports Medal for being a five-time premiership winning coach.

On 17 April 2008, Gibson was selected as Coach of Australian rugby league's Team of the Century. Part of the code's centenary year celebrations in Australia, the elite team is the panel's majority choice for those considered to be the best of all time.

The Jack Gibson Cup has been contested each season since 2008 by the Sydney Roosters and Parramatta Eels clubs, whom Gibson coached to consecutive premierships in 1974–75 and 1981–83 respectively. The Roosters have won all but one of the matches played for the Jack Gibson Cup.

== Personal tragedy ==
In 1988 Gibson's eldest son Luke aged 25, who had struggled with schizophrenia, died of a heroin overdose. Gibson and his wife Judy became fervent in their support of charities assisting research into schizophrenia and he donated the proceeds of four books he co-wrote with Ian Heads to that cause.

== Illness and death ==
Gibson was confined to a Sydney nursing home for two years before his death and required around-the-clock care as his condition deteriorated.

Gibson died on 9 May 2008, 90 minutes before rugby league's historic Centenary Test Match, after a two-year battle with Alzheimer's disease and dementia. His death was announced during the Centenary test by Peter Sterling on the Nine Network.

At all rugby league matches that weekend a minute's silence was held for him.

== Sources ==
- Whiticker, Alan & Hudson, Glen (2006) The Encyclopedia of Rugby League Players, Gavin Allen Publishing, Sydney
- Andrews, Malcolm (2006) The ABC of Rugby League Australian Broadcasting Corporation, Sydney
- Jack Gibson (with Ian Heads) The Last Word ABC Books, Sydney ISBN 0-7333-1236-5
- Jack Gibson (with Ian Heads) Played Strong, Done Fine : The Jack Gibson Collection Lester-Townsend Publishing. Sydney. 1988
- Jack Gibson Winning Starts on Monday: From the Jack Gibson Collection Lester-Townsend Publishing. Sydney. 1989
- Neil Cadigan, Tribute Article, Daily Telegraph 10 May 2008
- Whiticker, Alan & Collis, Ian (2006) The History of Rugby League Clubs, New Holland Publishers, Sydney
- Haddan, Steve (2007) The Finals – 100 Years of National Rugby League Finals, Steve Haddan Publishing, Brisbane
- Jack Gibson biography at Sport Australia Hall of Fame
- Jack Gibson: 'Greatest ever' rugby league coach – Obituary by Dave Hadfield for The Independent (London) 12 May 2008
