= Bob O'Reilly =

Australia international rugby league footballer

Personal information
- Full name: Robert Edward O'Reilly
- Born: 16 February 1949 (age 77) Rocklea, Queensland, Australia

Playing information
- Position: Prop
Club
Years	Team	Pld	T	G	FG	P
1967–75	Parramatta Eels	167	26	0	0	78
1976–77	Penrith Panthers	30	2	0	0	6
1978–79	Eastern Suburbs	38	6	0	0	18
1980–82	Parramatta Eels	49	3	0	0	9
	Total	284	37	0	0	111
Representative
Years	Team	Pld	T	G	FG	P
1970–74	New South Wales	9	0	0	0	0
1971–74	City NSW	4	0	0	0	0
1970–74	Australia	16	0	0	0	0

Robert Edward O'Reilly (born 16 February 1949) is an Australian former professional rugby league footballer who played in the 1960s, 1970s and 1980s. An Australian international and New South Wales interstate representative prop forward, he played in the New South Wales Rugby League premiership, mainly for the Parramatta Eels, but also for the Eastern Suburbs Roosters and Penrith Panthers.

== Playing career ==
Nicknamed 'The Bear', O'Reilly enjoyed a fifteen-year Sydney first grade career debuting for Parramatta at aged eighteen in 1967 and returning to the club in 1981 to first taste premiership success. He represented Australia in nine Tests and seven World Cup matches, including the Kangaroos' victory in the 1970 World Cup. He was the first Parramatta junior to represent Australia, having played his junior football with suburban Guildford. O'Reilly is named on the Australian Players Register as Kangaroo No. 450.

A decade after his first representative appearance, O'Reilly was part of Parramatta's first ever premiership-winning team of 1981. He held the record for highest number of first grade games at 284 until overtaken by Geoff Gerard.

== Accolades ==
O'Reilly was awarded Life Membership by the Parramatta Club in 1981. In 2002, a team of the greatest Parramatta players, known as the Parramatta Legends, were selected based on a public vote of fans with O'Reilly being selected at prop. In the same year, O'Reilly was inducted into the Parramatta hall of fame.

== Published sources ==
- Whiticker, Alan & Hudson, Glen (2006) The Encyclopedia of Rugby League Players, Gavin Allen Publishing, Sydney
- Apter, Jeff The Coaches : The Men Who Changed Rugby League (2014), The Five Mile Press Scoresby, Victoria
