= Greg Pierce =

Australia international rugby league player

Personal information
- Full name: Gregory Stuart Pierce
- Born: 4 March 1950 Sydney, New South Wales, Australia
- Died: 24 June 2016 (aged 66) Central Coast, New South Wales

Playing information
- Position: Lock
Club
Years	Team	Pld	T	G	FG	P
1969–80	Cronulla-Sutherland	210	35	0	0	105
Representative
Years	Team	Pld	T	G	FG	P
1973–78	Australia	8	1	0	0	3
1976–78	City NSW	2	0	0	0	0
1976–79	New South Wales	6	1	0	0	3

Coaching information
Club
Years	Team	Gms	W	D	L	W%
1981–82	Cronulla-Sutherland	49	26	2	21	53

Gregory Stuart Pierce (4 March 1950 – 24 June 2016) was an Australian rugby league player, coach and administrator. He played as a lock for the Cronulla-Sutherland Sharks in the National Rugby League competition and for Australia. He captained his country on one occasion.

== Junior football ==
Pierce grew up in Marrickville a suburb of Sydney and played his junior football for Sydenham in the Newtown Juniors as well as for the Belmore Old Boys in the Canterbury junior league. He was recommended to join Gymea in the fledgling Cronulla Sharks junior league after Sydenham were unable to field a team in his age group.

Pierce was at university studying civil engineering when he was graded by Cronulla in 1969.

== Club career ==
Tommy Bishop also arrived at Cronulla in 1969 and after the departure of Ken Kearney as coach in 1970, Bishop took over as captain and coach. The first half of Pierce's top grade career was played under the tutelage of Bishop.

Pierce was in the Cronulla side which made it to the grand final in 1973 to be beaten 10–7 by Manly in a game still regarded as one of the most brutal grand finals ever fought out.

Pierce became Cronulla captain in 1975, a role he would hold till his retirement in 1980. In Cronulla's successful 1978 finals campaign Pierce was sent-off in the major semi-final win over Wests and given a four-match suspension. Along with Dane Sorensen who had been suspended in the final premiership round, Pierce missed the 11-all Grand Final draw against Manly and the midweek replay three days later. Cronulla missed their presence and as a result the club again failed to win the premiership. Pierce led the Sharks to victory in the final of the midweek Amco Cup in 1979. He retired at the end of the 1980 season to take on the full-time coaching responsibility of the club.

In total Pierce made 210 first grade appearances between 1969 and 1980 for the Sharks. This tally currently stands in sixth place on the Sharks all-time list for most appearances. In 2005 Pierce was made a Sharks "Immortal".

=== Open Rugby inaugural World XIII ===
The Open Rugby inaugural World XIII was revealed in June 1978, it was; Graham Eadie, John Atkinson, Steve Rogers, Jean-Marc Bourret, Green Vigo, Roger Millward, Steve Nash, Jim Mills, Keith Elwell, Steve Pitchford, Terry Randall, George Nicholls, and Greg Pierce.

== Representative career ==
On the night of Cronulla's Grand Final loss to Manly the 1973 Kangaroo Tourists were announced and Pierce leapfrogged the usual City and NSW selection ladder to be named in the squad. He made his representative debut in the first Test against France in Perpignan in the process becoming Cronulla's first national representative player. He played one Test and seven minor matches on the tour.

Pierce played in the 1975 and 1977 World Series for a total of five World Cup appearances.

In 1978 Pierce captained both the City representative side and New South Wales before being announced captain for the trans-Tasman series against New Zealand. His captaincy was a surprise to the critics and to himself since Bob Fulton was also in the side with over ten Test appearances under his belt to that stage and ten years club captaincy experience.

Pierce captained Australia to a 24–2 victory in the first Test of that series becoming the first Cronulla player to do so. Steve Rogers is the only other Shark to have done so since.

Pierce was replaced by Queenslander Lew Platz for the second Test. The Whiticker source suggests this was so that the captaincy could be easily handed to Fulton since the selectors were then thinking about the upcoming year end Kangaroo Tour.

Pierce was back as vice-captain in the third Test of that 1978 series against New Zealand and was also announced as vice-captain for the 1978 Kangaroo tour. He appeared in four matches before a knee injury cut short his tour and prevented any further Test appearances.

=== Representative matches ===
Team	Matches	Years
New South Wales	6	1976–1979
Australia (Test & World Cup)	8	1973–78

== Post playing ==
Pierce followed Tommy Bishop as coach of the Sharks in 1981. They made the semi-finals that year but finished eighth in 1982 and Pierce left the club. He coached junior football on the Central Coast, New South Wales for a time, including coaching a Country Under 17s side. He moved to Lord Howe Island for a period where he was the island's operations manager. He returned to an active involvement with the Cronulla club in 1994 and was named one of the club's "Immortals " in 2003.

His grandfather, Arthur Folwell, was a 1933–34 Kangaroo Tourist who played two rugby league Tests for Australia. His father Richie Pierce was a successful referee and touch judge in the Newtown Juniors, and also for the New South Wales Rugby League.

Pierce was diagnosed with cancer in 2003, and died on 24 June 2016, aged 66.

== Sources ==
- Whiticker, Alan (2004) Captaining the Kangaroos, New Holland, Sydney
- Andrews, Malcolm (2006) The ABC of Rugby League Austn Broadcasting Corpn, Sydney

Sporting positions
Preceded by Greg Veivers	Australian national rugby league captain 1978	Succeeded by Bob Fulton
