= Steve Rogers (rugby league) =

Australian rugby league footballer and administrator

Personal information
- Full name: Steven Frederick Rogers
- Born: 20 November 1954 Gold Coast, Queensland, Australia
- Died: 3 January 2006 (aged 51) Cronulla, New South Wales, Australia

Playing information
- Position: Centre, Lock
Club
Years	Team	Pld	T	G	FG	P
1973–82	Cronulla Sharks	200	82	501	5	1253
1983–84	St. George Dragons	29	8	42	5	121
1985	Cronulla Sharks	2	0	0	0	0
1986	Widnes	1	0	0	0	0
	Total	232	90	543	10	1374
Representative
Years	Team	Pld	T	G	FG	P
1973–82	New South Wales	21	7	6	0	33
1973–82	Australia	24	7	0	0	21
- Relatives: Mat Rogers (son)

Steven Frederick Rogers (20 November 1954 – 3 January 2006) was an Australian professional rugby league footballer who played in the 1970s and 1980s. He played for the Cronulla-Sutherland Sharks and St. George Dragons teams in the New South Wales Rugby League premiership competition and for Widnes in the English Championship, usually in the position of centre. Rogers represented New South Wales and Australia captaining the national team once in 1981.

After his retirement, Rogers was named as one of the five "immortals" of the Cronulla club. He became involved in the administration of rugby league, and held the position of Cronulla's CEO at the time of his death.

Rogers died after swallowing a combination of prescription drugs and alcohol on 3 January 2006. In April 2006, the NSW state coroner ruled that the death was accidental.

== Biography ==
Steve Rogers was born on the Gold Coast and played his first senior game for the Southport Tigers. In the 1972 Gold Coast Group 18 competition 17-year-old centre Steve Rogers helped a Gold Coast Tigers outfit to victory in the Grand Final against Tweed Heads Seagulls. The following season he moved to Sydney to play in the NSWRFL Premiership.

=== 1973 ===
Rogers began playing first grade rugby league at the age of eighteen for the Cronulla-Sutherland club in 1973. Playing the position of centre, his talent did not go unnoticed. He was described by the club's captain/coach, Tommy Bishop as a "rare, rare talent – the greatest all round centre three-quarter I have seen." In that year, he played in his first Grand final, which Cronulla lost to the Manly-Warringah Sea Eagles and made the first of three Kangaroo Tours.

=== 1974–1982 ===
Rogers led Cronulla to the grand final as captain, in 1978, once more against the Sea Eagles. The match was a tie, and Cronulla lost a replay in the following week. During that season, he was often switched to lock forward and was effective in that role. Three years later, he won the Dally M Lock of the Year award.

In 1975 Rogers won the Rothmans Medal for best and fairest player in the NSWRFL. He played for New South Wales in 1980's first state of origin match. He was named player of the series in the 1981 Tooth Cup tournament and also won that year's Dally M Award.

Rogers was selected to tour with the Australian national rugby league team on the 1973 Kangaroo Tour. National honours continued when he was selected in the Australian squad for the 1975 Rugby League World Cup, 1977 Rugby League World Cup, 1978 Kangaroo tour, 1980 Tour of New Zealand and was a centre in all three tests against Great Britain and the two tests against France on the 1982 Kangaroo Tour, as well as playing in the pre-tour test against Papua New Guinea. Rogers would captain the Kangaroos in the two 1981 home tests against France.

=== 1983–1984 ===
As a result of Cronulla's serious financial difficulties, Rogers signed for 1983 with Cronulla's local rival, the St. George Dragons. He played with them for two seasons, culminating in playing five-eighth in the Saints 1984 reserve grade Grand Final (a side which featured others such as Michael O'Connor), which the Dragons lost.

=== 1985–1986 ===
Rogers returned to Cronulla in 1985, but only played nine minutes in the season after breaking his jaw in his first game of the year against the Canterbury-Bankstown Bulldogs, in a tackle from Mark Bugden.

In 1986 Rogers signed with Widnes in the English competition, but only played for 13 minutes before breaking his leg in his first game of the year against Wigan. This was the last game of his career.

=== Post playing ===
After retiring from the playing field Rogers remained involved with rugby league coaching. He coached for a time in Queensland, and worked in administrative roles for the Australian Rugby League in Darwin and Perth. After an unsuccessful business venture running a hotel at Lennox Head, Rogers became involved once more with the Cronulla club, becoming the football manager and later, Chief Executive Officer of the club.

His personal life was marred by tragedy. After losing his father (Don) and mother (Marj) to cancer, his wife Carol also died from the disease on 11 May 2001. Rogers' brother also committed suicide.

On 3 January 2006, Rogers was found dead outside the door of his Cronulla unit. Initial reports of a heart attack soon turned to suggestions of suicide as the existence of three letters—apparently suicide notes to his three children—was revealed. His son Mat also confirmed that his father had been suffering from depression: "He was suffering from some depression and, as a person of his stature and a public figure, he found it really hard to talk about it to other people and therefore exacerbated the problem," he said. Police believed that he had swallowed a cocktail of alcohol and prescription drugs. There has been some speculation that Rogers may have attempted to make an emergency telephone call in the moments before his death.

=== Accolades ===
In February 2008, Rogers was named in the list of Australia's 100 Greatest Players (1908–2007) which was commissioned by the NRL and ARL to celebrate the code's centenary year in Australia. While playing football, Rogers also served in the New South Wales Police Force and in 2008, rugby league's centennial year in Australia, he was named at five-eighth in a NSW Police team of the century. Also in 2008 Rogers was named in New South Wales' rugby league team of the century.

=== Open Rugby inaugural World XIII ===
The Open Rugby inaugural World XIII was revealed in June 1978: Graham Eadie, John Atkinson, Steve Rogers, Jean-Marc Bourret, Green Vigo, Roger Millward, Steve Nash, Jim Mills, Keith Elwell, Steve Pitchford, Terry Randall, George Nicholls and Greg Pierce.

== Career playing statistics ==
=== Point scoring summary ===
Games	Tries	Goals	F/G	Points
311	129	582	10	1571

=== Matches played ===
Team	Matches	Years
Cronulla Sharks	202	1973–1985
Widnes	1	1986
New South Wales (residents)	17	1973–1979
New South Wales (state of origin)	4	1980–1982
Australia (Tests)	21	1973–1981
Australia (World Cup)	3	1975, 1977
Australia (tour matches)	27	1973, 1978

=== Records ===
- Until 2002, Rogers held the record for the most points scored in a match (26) for the Cronulla club.
- Rogers is one of twenty Australian internationals to come from the Cronulla club, and one of two players (alongside Greg Pierce) to have captained the national side.
- Rogers holds the standing record for the most points ever scored for the Cronulla club (1253)

== Sources ==
- Australian Associated Press (3 January 2006) "Football great Rogers found dead", The Australian. Retrieved 4 January 2006
- Cubby, Ben et al. (5 January 2006) "Depressed and unable to talk about it: Mat tells of his father's greatest struggle", Sydney Morning Herald. Retrieved 5 January 2006
- Heads, Ian (4 January 2006) "Vale 'the complete footballer'" The Australian (page 14)
- Kogoy, Peter; McDonald, Annabelle (5 January 2006). "Legend's fatal drug, alcohol cocktail". The Australian. Archived from the original on 6 February 2006.
- Magnay, Jacquelin (6 January 2005) "Phone slip-up may have killed Rogers" Sydney Morning Herald. Retrieved 9 January 2006.
- Watson, Rhett (5 January 2006). "Depression plagued league star". news.com.au. Archived from the original on 10 June 2008.
- Cronulla Sharks official website (Individual Player Records)
- Widnes Vikings official website (Player Biography)
- World of Rugby League website

== Footnotes ==
Preceded by George Peponis	Australian national rugby league captain 1981	Succeeded by Max Krilich
