= 1978 Manly-Warringah Sea Eagles season =

- NSWRFL champions
- NSWRFL rank: 3rd
- 1976 record: Wins: 18; draws: 2; losses: 8
- Points scored: For: 510; against: 346

Team information
- Secretary: (Australia) Ken Arthurson
- Coach: (Australia) Frank Stanton
- Captains: (Australia) Max Krilich; (Australia) Terry Randall (vice-captain)
- Stadium: Brookvale Oval

Top scorers
- Tries: (Australia) Tom Mooney (11)
- Goals: (Australia) John Gray (61)
- Points: (Australia) John Gray (134)
← 1977	1979 →

The 1978 Manly-Warringah Sea Eagles season was the 32nd in the club's history since their entry into the then New South Wales Rugby Football League premiership in 1947.

The 1978 Sea Eagles were coached by 1963–64 Kangaroo tourist Frank Stanton. Captaining the side was long serving hooker Max Krilich. The club competed in the New South Wales Rugby Football League's 1978 Premiership season and played its home games at the 27,000 capacity Brookvale Oval.

== Ladder ==
	Team	Pld	W	D	L	PF	PA	PD	Pts
1	Western Suburbs	22	16	1	5	426	288	+138	33
2	Cronulla-Sutherland	22	15	0	7	418	261	+157	30
3	Manly-Warringah	22	15	0	7	427	287	+140	30
4	Parramatta	22	14	0	8	525	306	+219	28
5	Canterbury-Bankstown	22	13	2	7	307	273	+34	28
6	Eastern Suburbs	22	13	0	9	377	280	+57	26
7	South Sydney	22	12	1	9	298	300	-2	25
8	St. George	22	10	1	11	367	354	+13	21
9	Balmain	22	9	1	12	337	344	-7	19
10	Penrith	22	4	2	16	206	463	-257	10
11	North Sydney	22	4	1	17	325	439	-114	9
12	Newtown	22	2	1	19	199	577	-378	5

== Regular season ==
Sunday 26 March	Manly-Warringah Sea Eagles	19 – 5	St. George Dragons	Brookvale Oval, Sydney
	Tries: Johnny Gibbs, Max Krilich, Tom Mooney; Goals: Graham Eadie (5/9)	[ Report]	Tries: Steve Butler; Goals: Ted Goodwin (1)	Attendance: 23,168; Referee: Gary Cook

Saturday 1 April	Manly-Warringah Sea Eagles	17 – 10	Penrith Panthers	Brookvale Oval, Sydney
	Tries: Russel Gartner, Johnny Gibbs, Stephen Knight; Goals: Graham Eadie (4/5)	[ Report]	Tries: Paul Merlo; Goals: Ken Wilson (2/3)	Attendance: 4,084; Referee: Jack Danzey

Sunday 9 April	Manly-Warringah Sea Eagles	44 – 17	Newtown Bluebags	Brookvale Oval, Sydney
	Tries: Russel Gartner (2), Alan Thompson (2), Ray Branighan, Johnny Gibbs, John Gray, Ray Higgs, Terry Randall, Bruce Walker; Goals: Graham Eadie (7)	[ Report]	Tries: John Ribot, Steve Bowden; Goals: Phil Sigsworth (3); John Ribot (1)	Attendance: 8,085; Referee: Don Macdonald

Sunday 16 April	Canterbury-Bankstown Bulldogs	16 – 13	Manly-Warringah Sea Eagles	Belmore Sports Ground, Sydney
	Tries: Pat English, Steve Gearin; Goals: Steve Gearin (5/5)	[ Report]	Tries: Johnny Gibbs, John Gray, Stephen Knight; Goals: Graham Eadie (2)	Attendance: 13,373; Referee: Jack Danzey

Sunday 23 April	Parramatta Eels	15 – 27	Manly-Warringah Sea Eagles	Sydney Cricket Ground, Sydney
	Tries: Neville Glover, Phil Mann, Graham Murray; Goals: Michael Cronin (3/5)	[ Report]	Tries: Simon Booth, Graham Eadie, Tom Mooney, Ian Thomson, Bruce Walker; Goals: Graham Eadie (5/7); John Gray (1)	Attendance: 44,507; Referee: Denis Braybrook

Sunday 30 April	Manly-Warringah Sea Eagles	29 – 13	Balmain Tigers	Brookvale Oval, Sydney
	Tries: Johnny Gibbs, Stephen Knight, Tom Mooney, Alan Thompson, Bruce Walker; Goals: John Gray (7)	[ Report]	Tries:, Rex Murphy; Goals: (1/3); Mark Tonks (1/1)	Attendance: 17,225; Referee: Gary Cook

Sunday 7 May	Western Suburbs Magpies	13 – 7	Manly-Warringah Sea Eagles	Lidcombe Oval, Sydney
	Tries: Bruce Gibbs; Goals: John Dorahy (5)	[ Report]	Tries: Stephen Knight, Ian Thomson; Goals: Graham Eadie (2)	Attendance: 10,931; Referee: Denis Braybrook

Sunday 14 May	Manly-Warringah Sea Eagles	5 – 30	South Sydney Rabbitohs	Brookvale Oval, Sydney
	Tries: Ray Branighan; Goals: Graham Eadie (1/4)	[ Report]	Tries: Trevor Barnes, John Berne, Terry Fahey, Eric Ferguson, Bob McMillan, John Peek; Goals: Eric Ferguson (6)	Attendance: 11,103; Referee: Don Macdonald

Sunday 21 May	North Sydney Bears	10 – 11	Manly-Warringah Sea Eagles	North Sydney Oval, Sydney
	Tries: Don McKinnon, Tony Quirk; Goals: Peter Schofield (2/5)	[ Report]	Tries: Tony Ashworth; Goals: John Gray (4)	Attendance: 6,823; Referee: Kevin Roberts

Sunday 28 May	Cronulla-Sutherland Sharks	8 – 27	Manly-Warringah Sea Eagles	Endeavour Field, Sydney
	Tries: Dave Chamberlin, Gary Stares; Goals: Barry Andrews (1)	[ Report]	Tries: Simon Booth, Terry Randall, Ian Thomson; Goals: John Gray (6)	Attendance: 14,665; Referee: Gary Cook

Sunday 4 June	Manly-Warringah Sea Eagles	15 – 12	Eastern Suburbs Roosters	Brookvale Oval, Sydney
	Tries: Russel Gartner, Ian Thomson; Goals: John Gray (4); Field Goals: Steve Martin (1)	[ Report]	Tries: Royce Ayliffe, Bob Fulton; Goals: Ken Stevens (3)	Attendance: 19,657; Referee: Gary Cook

Sunday 11 June	St. George Dragons	22 – 13	Manly-Warringah Sea Eagles	Kogarah Oval, Sydney
	Tries: Mitch Brennan, Steve Butler, Ted Goodwin, John Jansen; Goals: Ted Goodwin (5)	[ Report]	Tries: Graham Eadie, Johnny Gibbs, John Gray; Goals: Graham Eadie (1); John Gray (1)	Attendance: 16,800; Referee: Jack Danzey

Saturday 17 June	Penrith Panthers	9 – 32	Manly-Warringah Sea Eagles	Penrith Park, Sydney
	Tries: Greg Moore; Goals: Phil Gould (3)	[ Report]	Tries: Tom Mooney (2), Graham Eadie, Stephen Knight, Max Krilich, Steve Martin; Goals: John Gray (6); Graham Eadie (1)	Attendance: 6,916; Referee: Kevin Roberts

Sunday 25 June	Newtown Bluebags	17 – 10	Manly-Warringah Sea Eagles	Henson Park, Sydney
	Tries: Mick Kermode, Phil Sigsworth; Goals: Mick Kermode (2)	[ Report]	Tries: Ray Branighan, Lindsay Drake, Tom Mooney; Goals: John Gray (4)	Attendance: John Gocher; Referee: 3,167

Sunday 2 July	Manly-Warringah Sea Eagles	9 – 12	Canterbury-Bankstown Bulldogs	Brookvale Oval, Sydney
	Tries: Tom Mooney; Goals: John Gray (3)	[ Report]	Tries: Mark Hughes, Bill Noonan; Goals: Steve Gearin (3)	Attendance: 7,818; Referee: Don Macdonald

Sunday 9 July	Manly-Warringah Sea Eagles	19 – 20	Parramatta Eels	Brookvale Oval, Sydney
	Tries: Russel Gartner, Johnny Gibbs, Ian Thomson; Goals: Graham Eadie (5)	[ Report]	Tries: Ray Price (2), Michael Cronin, Neville Glover; Goals: Michael Cronin (4)	Attendance: 20,030; Referee: Gary Cook

Sunday 11 July	Balmain Tigers	19 – 7	Manly-Warringah Sea Eagles	Leichhardt Oval, Sydney
	Tries: Larry Corowa, Noel Maybury; Goals: Allan McMahon (6); Field Goals: Les Mara (1)	[ Report]	Tries: Chris Montgomery; Goals: John Gray (2)	Attendance: 7,869; Referee: Kevin Roberts

Sunday 23 July	Manly-Warringah Sea Eagles	16 – 10	Western Suburbs Magpies	Brookvale Oval, Sydney
	Tries: Steve Martin, Wayne Springall; Goals: Graham Eadie (3); John Gray (2)	[ Report]	Tries: Eric Cain, Ron Giteau; Goals: Peter Rowles (2)	Attendance: 14,171; Referee: Greg Hartley

Saturday 30 July	South Sydney Rabbitohs	10 – 14	Manly-Warringah Sea Eagles	Redfern Oval, Sydney
	Tries: Kenneth Stewart, Peter Tunks; Goals: Eric Ferguson (2)	[ Report]	Tries: Ian Martin, Steve Martin; Goals: John Gray (4)	Attendance: 17,148; Referee: Greg Hartley

Sunday 6 August	Manly-Warringah Sea Eagles	40 – 12	North Sydney Bears	Brookvale Oval, Sydney
	Tries: Steve Martin (3), Tom Mooney (2), Bruce Walker (2), Simon Booth, Johnny Gibbs, Max Krilich; Goals: John Gray (5)	[ Report]	Tries: John Adam, Glen Boatswain; Goals: Peter Schofield (3)	Attendance: 11,058; Referee: Kevin Roberts

Sunday 13 August	Manly-Warringah Sea Eagles	26 – 4	Cronulla-Sutherland Sharks	Brookvale Oval, Sydney
	Tries: Graham Eadie, Johnny Gibbs, Tom Mooney, Ian Thomson; Goals: John Gray (7)	[ Report]	Tries: Goals: Barry Andrews (2)	Attendance: 12,135; Referee: Jack Danzey

Sunday 20 August	Eastern Suburbs Roosters	11 – 30	Manly-Warringah Sea Eagles	Sydney Sports Ground, Sydney
	Tries: Bill Mullins, Bob O'Reilly; Goals: Kevin Stevens (2/4)	[ Report]	Tries: Simon Booth, Graham Eadie, John Gray, Stephen Knight; Goals: John Gray (3); Field Goals: Graham Eadie (1); Johnny Gibbs (1)	Attendance: 22,049; Referee: Greg Hartley

== Finals ==
=== Major Prelim Semi-Final ===
Saturday 26 August	Cronulla-Sutherland Sharks	17 – 12	Manly-Warringah Sea Eagles	Sydney Cricket Ground, Sydney
	Tries: Eric Archer, Mick Mullane, Steve Rogers; Goals: Steve Rogers (4)	[ Report]	Tries: Simon Booth, Russel Gartner, Ian Martin; Goals: Graham Eadie (1); Field Goals: Johnny Gibbs (1)	Attendance: 17,718; Referee: Jack Danzey

=== Minor Semi-Final ===
Sunday 3 September	Parramatta Eels	13 – 13	Manly-Warringah Sea Eagles	Sydney Cricket Ground, Sydney
	Tries: Michael Cronin, Geoff Gerard, Graham Murray; Goals: Michael Cronin (2/5)	[ Report]	Tries: Simon Booth, Russel Gartner, Bruce Walker; Goals: John Gray (2/2)	Attendance: 30,850; Referee: Greg Hartley

==== Minor Semi-Final Replay ====
Wednesday 6 September	Manly-Warringah Sea Eagles	17 – 11	Parramatta Eels	Sydney Cricket Ground, Sydney
	Tries: Russel Gartner, John Harvey, Steve Martin; Goals: Graham Eadie (4)	[ Report]	Tries: Geoff Gerard, Glenn West, Neville Glover; Goals: Michael Cronin (1/3)	Attendance: 42,678; Referee: Greg Hartley

=== Preliminary Final ===
Saturday 9 September	Manly-Warringah Sea Eagles	14 – 7	Western Suburbs Magpies	Sydney Cricket Ground, Sydney
	Tries: Alan Thompson (2); Goals: Graham Eadie (4)	[ Report]	Tries: Ron Giteau; Goals: Peter Rowles (2)	Attendance: 27,345; Referee: Greg Hartley

=== Grand Final ===
Saturday 16 September

Manly-Warringah Sea Eagles	11 – 11	Cronulla-Sutherland Sharks
Tries: Tom Mooney; Goals: Graham Eadie (4/6)		Tries: Steve Edmonds; Goals: Steve Rogers (4/4)

Sydney Cricket Ground, Sydney
Attendance: 51,510
Referee: Greg Hartley

Manly-Warringah	Cronulla-Sutherland

FB	1	Graham Eadie
LW	2	Tom Mooney
CE	3	Russel Gartner
CE	4	Stephen Knight
RW	5	Simon Booth
FE	6	Alan Thompson
HB	7	Steve Martin
LK	8	Ian Martin
SR	9	Terry Randall
SR	10	Bruce Walker
PR	11	John Harvey
HK	12	Max Krilich (c)
PR	13	Ian Thomson
Substitutions:
IC	14
IC	15
Coach:
(Australia) Frank Stanton

FB	1	Mick Mullane
LW	2	Rick Bourke
CE	3	Steve Rogers (c)
CE	4	Dave Chamberlin
RW	5	Steve Edmonds
FE	6	Barry Andrews
HB	7	Steve Hansard
LK	8	John Glossop
SR	9	Eric Archer
SR	10	Steve Kneen
PR	11	Gary Stares
HK	12	John McMartin
PR	13	Paul Khan
Substitutions:
IC	14	Rowland Beckett
IC	15
Coach:
(Australia) Norm Provan

In the Grand Final, Cronulla went to a 9-4 lead in the second half before Manly came back to hit the front 11-9. A Steve Rogers penalty squared it at 11-all but he then missed a desperate late field-goal attempt and at full-time the scores remained locked. For the second consecutive season the weary Grand Finalists were required to play a mid-week rematch three days later (the NSWRFL were forced to play the replay on the Tuesday and not the following weekend due to the upcoming 1978 Kangaroo tour, with the Australian team due to leave that weekend for their tour. The drawn GF also forced the Australian Rugby League to hold off on naming the touring squad until after the GF replay with as many as 12 players from Manly and Cronulla in contention to be selected).

==== Grand Final Replay ====
Tuesday 19 September

Manly-Warringah Sea Eagles	16 – 0	Cronulla-Sutherland Sharks
Tries: Russel Gartner (2); Graham Eadie; Goals: Graham Eadie (3/8); Field Goals: Graham Eadie (1)		Tries: Goals:

Sydney Cricket Ground, Sydney
Attendance: 33,552
Referee: Greg Hartley
Player of the Match: Graham Eadie

Manly-Warringah	Cronulla-Sutherland

FB	1	Graham Eadie
LW	2	Tom Mooney
CE	3	Russel Gartner
CE	4	Stephen Knight
RW	5	Simon Booth
FE	6	Alan Thompson
HB	7	Steve Martin
LK	8	Ian Martin
SR	9	Terry Randall
SR	10	Bruce Walker
PR	11	John Harvey
HK	12	Max Krilich (c)
PR	13	Ian Thomson
Substitutions:
IC	14	Ray Branighan
IC	15	Wayne Springall
Coach:
(Australia) Frank Stanton

FB	1	Rick Bourke
LW	2	Chris Gardner
CE	3	Steve Rogers (c)
CE	4	Dave Chamberlin
RW	5	Steve Edmonds
FE	6	Martin Raftery
HB	7	Steve Hansard
LK	8	John Glossop
SR	9	Eric Archer
SR	10	Steve Kneen
PR	11	Peter Ryan
HK	12	Rowland Beckett
PR	13	Paul Khan
Substitutions:
IC	14
IC	15
Coach:
(Australia) Norm Provan

The Tuesday rematch in front of 33,552 was Manly's sixth game in twenty-four days. It was the second Grand Final in a row to end up going into a mid-week replay with the 1977 Grand Final between St George and Parramatta also needing a re-match to decide the Premiers after the original game had been a 9-all draw.

In the first half Cronulla had no answer to Graham Eadie's blind-side bursts. His display completely routed the hapless Sharks and Manly went to the break holding a 15-0 lead thanks to a try by Eadie in the scoreboard corner, one he set up for centre Russel Gartner in the same corner, and another 65 metre effort by Gartner after a sweeping backline movement saw him run into open space and easily outpace the Sharks defence to score in front of the Sheridan Stand.

The only points in the second half came from a field goal by Eadie.

In the replay, Manly were led by captain Max Krilich and coach Frank Stanton. Terry Randall played in the finals despite requiring pain-killing injections before matches. Key contributors included five-eighth Alan Thompson and fullback Graham Eadie, who was named man of the match.

As of the 2016 NRL Grand Final, no player since Eadie has scored the combination of a try, a goal and a field-goal in a Grand Final.

The refereeing of Greg "Hollywood" Hartley in the replay and throughout the 1978 Finals series attracted criticism from coaches Roy Masters (Western Suburbs), Jack Gibson (South Sydney) and Terry Fearnley (Parramatta), all of whom appealed to the NSWRFL to prohibit Hartley from refereeing their clubs' matches the following season.

== Player statistics ==
Note: Games and (sub) show total games played, e.g. 1 (1) is 2 games played.

Player	Games (sub)	Tries	Goals	FG	Points
(Australia) David Adams					
(Australia) Tony Ashworth					
(Australia) Simon Booth		8			24
(Australia) Ray Branighan		3			9
(Australia) Greg Gross					
(Australia) Lindsay Drake		1			3
(Australia) Graham Eadie		6	52	2	124
(Australia) Russel Gartner		10			30
(Australia) Johnny Gibbs		9		2	29
(England) John Gray		4	61		134
(Australia) John Harvey		1			3
(Australia) Mick Healey					
(Australia) Ray Higgs		1			3
(Australia) Stephen Knight		5			15
(Australia) Max Krilich (c)		3			9
(Australia) Ian Martin		2			6
(Australia) Steve Martin		7		1	22
(Australia) Chris Montgomery		1			3
(Australia) Tom Mooney		11			33
(Australia) Ed Planten					
(Australia) Terry Randall (vc)		2			6
(Australia) Wayne Springall		1			3
(Australia) Alan Thompson		5			15
(Australia) Ian Thomson		6			18
(Australia) Gary Thoroughgood					
(Australia) Bruce Walker		6			18
TOTAL		93	113	5	510

== Representative Players ==
=== International ===
- Australia – Graham Eadie, Johnny Gibbs, Max Krilich, Steve Martin, Alan Thompson, Ian Thomson, Bruce Walker, Frank Stanton (coach)

=== State ===
- New South Wales – Graham Eadie, Johnny Gibbs, Max Krilich, Steve Martin, Terry Randall, Ian Thomson, Frank Stanton (coach)

=== City vs Country ===
- City Firsts – Terry Randall, Ian Thomson, Frank Stanton (coach)
- City Seconds – Russel Gartner, Johnny Gibbs, Bruce Walker, Frank Stanton (coach)
