= List of Manly Warringah Sea Eagles records =

Records for the Manly Warringah Sea Eagles club have been recorded since their first season in the New South Wales Rugby Football League premiership in 1947.

== Premierships and titles ==
As of 5 September 2025

Manly Warringah Sea Eagles
Premiership titles	1972, 1973, 1976, 1978, 1987, 1996, 2008, 2011 (8)
Premiership runners-up	1951, 1957, 1959, 1968, 1970, 1982, 1983, 1995, 1997, 2007, 2013 (11)
Minor premiership titles	1971, 1972, 1973, 1976, 1983, 1987, 1995, 1996, 1997 (9)
Pre-Season Cup / Pre-Season Challenge	1980, 2023 (2)
Sevens tournaments	1990, 1994, 1995 (3)
NRL Nines tournaments	Nil
Reserve Grade titles	1954, 1960, 1969, 1973, 1988 (5)
Jersey Flegg Cup titles	1961, 1974, 1987 (3)
Third grade titles	1952 (1)
Presidents Cup	1946, 1970 (2)
National Youth Competition Titles	2017 (1)
KB Cup	1982, 1983 (2)
S. G. Ball Cup	Nil
Harold Matthews Cup	2018, 2021 (2)
Club championships	1972, 1983, 1987, 1988 (4)
First grade wooden spoons	Nil
World Club Challenge	2009

== Player records ==
All player records are for first grade premiership games only.
Players in bold are still active (as of 2027).
* Still playing as of 2027 but no longer with Manly

=== Most games for club ===
Only those with 200 or more first grade games shown.

- 352, Daly Cherry-Evans (2011–2025)
- 309, Cliff Lyons (1986–1999)
- 280, Steve Menzies (1993–1999, 2003–2008)
- 278, Anthony Watmough (2003–2014)
- 265, **Jake Trbojevic (2013–)**
- 263, Alan Thompson (1973–1984)
- 256, Des Hasler (1984–1993, 1995–1996)
- 241, Fred Jones (1961–1963, 1965–1975)
- 238, Geoff Toovey (1988–1999)
- 237, Graham Eadie (1971–1983)
- 233, Brett Stewart (2003–2016)
- 230, Steve Matai (2005–2016)
- 224, Jamie Lyon (2007–2016)
- 221, Brent Kite (2005–2013)
- 217, Jason King (2003–2014)
- 217, Matt Ballin (2007–2015)
- 215, Max Krilich (1970, 1973–1983)
- 213, Bob Fulton (1966–1976)
- 208, Terry Randall (1970–1982)
- 208, Owen Cunningham (1985–1996, 1999)
- 205, Bob Batty (1959–1971)
- 204, Paul Vautin (1979–1989)

=== Most points for club ===
- 1,917 (71 tries, 847 goals, 3 field goals), Graham Eadie (1971–1983)
- 1,434 (100 tries, 517 goals), **Reuben Garrick*** (2019–2026)
- 1,410 (86 tries, 533 goals), Jamie Lyon (2007–2016)
- 1,158 (40 tries, 502 goals, 19 field goals), Bob Batty (1959–1971)
- 1,093 (32 tries, 477 goals, 11 field goals), Matthew Ridge (1990–1996)
- 958 (20 tries, 447 goals, 2 field goals), Ron Willey (1956–1962)
- 842 (46 tries, 352 goals), Ron Rowles (1950–1954)
- 833 (98 tries, 206 goals, 29 field goals), Daly Cherry-Evans (2011–2025)
- 652 (163 tries), Brett Stewart (2003–2016)
- 606 (151 tries, 1 goal), Steve Menzies (1993–1999, 2003–2008)

=== Most tries for club ===
- 163, Brett Stewart (2003–2016)
- 151, Steve Menzies (1993–1999, 2003–2008)
- 129, Bob Fulton (1966–1976)
- 119, **Tom Trbojevic (2015–)**
- 100, **Reuben Garrick*** (2019–2026)
- 98, Daly Cherry-Evans (2011–2025)
- 91, Steve Matai (2005–2016)
- 88, Jorge Taufua (2012–2022)
- 86, Jamie Lyon (2007–2016)
- 84, **Jason Saab (2021–)**
- 83, Tom Mooney (1975–1981)
- 80, Cliff Lyons (1986–1999)
- 72, Des Hasler (1984–1993, 1995–1996)
- 71, Graham Eadie (1971–1983)
- 71, Anthony Watmough (2003–2014)

=== Most goals for club ===
- 847, Graham Eadie (1971–1983)
- 533, Jamie Lyon (2007–2016)
- 517, **Reuben Garrick*** (2019–2026)
- 502, Bob Batty (1959–1971)
- 477, Matthew Ridge (1990–1996)
- 447, Ron Willey (1956–1962)
- 352, Ron Rowles (1950–1954)
- 248, Matt Orford (2006–2009)
- 206, Daly Cherry-Evans (2011–2025)
- 182, Michael O'Connor (1987–1992)

=== Most field goals for club ===
- 57, Bob Fulton (1966–1976)
- 30, Dennis Ward (1968–1972)
- 29, Daly Cherry-Evans (2011–2025)
- 19, Bob Batty, (1959–1971)
- 11, Matthew Ridge (1990–1996)

=== Most points in a season ===
- 334 (23 tries, 121 goals), **Reuben Garrick*** in 2021
- 257 (11 tries, 106 goals, 1 field goal), Matthew Ridge in 1995
- 242 (14 tries, 100 goals), Graham Eadie in 1975
- 242 (16 tries, 89 goals), Jamie Lyon in 2013
- 234 (5 tries, 106 goals, 2 field goals), Matthew Ridge in 1994
- 233 (9 tries, 103 goals), Graham Eadie in 1976
- 226 (7 tries, 99 goals), Graham Eadie in 1983
- 221 (13 tries, 91 goals), Ron Rowles in 1954
- 220 (12 tries, 92 goals), Ron Rowles in 1951
- 216 (10 tries, 93 goals), Graham Eadie in 1974
- 202 (10 tries, 81 goals), **Reuben Garrick*** in 2024

=== Most tries in a season ===
- 28, **Tom Trbojevic** in 2021
- 27, Phil Blake in 1983
- 26, **Jason Saab** in 2021
- 23, Kevin Junee in 1974
- 23, **Reuben Garrick*** in 2021
- 22, Steve Menzies in 1995
- 22, Terry Hill in 1997
- 22, Brett Stewart in 2008
- 21, Bob Fulton in 1976
- 20, John Ribot in 1982
- 20, Steve Menzies in 1996
- 20, Steve Menzies in 1998
- 20, David Williams in 2013
- 20, Jorge Taufua in 2013

=== Most goals in a season ===
- 121, **Reuben Garrick*** in 2021
- 106, Matthew Ridge in 1994
- 106, Matthew Ridge in 1995
- 103, Graham Eadie in 1976
- 100, Graham Eadie in 1975
- 99, Graham Eadie in 1983
- 93, Graham Eadie in 1974
- 92, Ron Rowles in 1951
- 91, Ron Rowles in 1954
- 89, Jamie Lyon in 2013

=== Most field goals in a season ===
- 19, Bob Fulton in 1970
- 14, Bob Fulton in 1968
- 14, Dennis Ward in 1968
- 11, Dennis Ward in 1970
- 10, Bob Fulton in 1967

=== Most points in a match ===
- 30 (4 tries, 9 goals), Ron Rowles vs. Canterbury-Bankstown Berries on 24 July 1954 @ Brookvale Oval
- 30 (2 tries, 11 goals), Matthew Ridge vs. Western Suburbs Magpies on 25 August 1996 @ Brookvale Oval
- 30 (2 tries, 11 goals), **Reuben Garrick*** vs. Canterbury-Bankstown Bulldogs on 3 July 2021 @ Bankwest Stadium
- 30 (3 tries, 9 goals), **Reuben Garrick*** vs. Dolphins on 9 June 2023 @ 4 Pines Park
- 28 (14 goals), Graham Eadie vs. Penrith on 29 July 1973 @ Penrith Park
- 28 (3 tries, 8 goals), Matthew Ridge vs. Western Reds on 25 June 1995 @ Brookvale Oval
- 28 (3 tries, 8 goals), Matt Orford vs. Sydney Roosters on 7 July 2007 @ Brookvale Oval
- 28 (4 tries, 6 goals), **Reuben Garrick*** vs. Gold Coast Titans on 20 June 2021 @ Cbus Super Stadium
- 28 (3 tries, 8 goals), **Reuben Garrick*** vs. Parramatta Eels on 14 August 2021 @ Sunshine Coast Stadium
- 28 (4 tries, 6 goals), **Reuben Garrick*** vs. Canberra Raiders on 23 March 2025 @ 4 Pines Park

=== Most tries in a match ===
- 5, Les Hanigan vs. Cronulla-Sutherland on 14 May 1967 @ Brookvale Oval
- 4, Ron Rowles vs. Canterbury-Bankstown Berries on 24 July 1954 @ Brookvale Oval
- 4, Tom Mooney vs. Canterbury-Bankstown Bulldogs on 25 August 1979 @ Brookvale Oval
- 4, **Reuben Garrick*** vs. Gold Coast Titans on 20 June 2021 @ Cbus Super Stadium
- 4, **Reuben Garrick*** vs. Canberra Raiders on 23 March 2025 @ 4 Pines Park

=== Most goals in a match ===
- 14, Graham Eadie vs. Penrith Panthers on 29 July 1973 @ Penrith Park
- 12, Graham Eadie vs. South Sydney Rabbitohs on 24 August 1975 @ Brookvale Oval
- 11, Mike Eden vs. Canberra Raiders on 11 July 1982 @ Brookvale Oval
- 11, Matthew Ridge vs. Western Suburbs Magpies on 25 August 1996 @ Brookvale Oval
- 11, **Reuben Garrick*** vs. Canterbury-Bankstown Bulldogs on 3 July 2021 @ Bankwest Stadium
- 11, **Reuben Garrick*** vs. Dolphins on 9 June 2023 @ 4 Pines Park
- 10, Bob Batty vs. Eastern Suburbs Roosters on 17 July 1966 @ Sydney Sports Ground
- 10, Graham Eadie vs. Parramatta Eels on 15 July 1973 @ Brookvale Oval
- 10, Graham Eadie vs. North Sydney Bears on 25 April 1976 @ Brookvale Oval
- 10, Graham Eadie vs. Newtown Jets on 14 August 1977 @ Brookvale Oval
- 10, Graham Eadie vs. South Sydney Rabbitohs on 29 August 1982 @ Brookvale Oval
- 10, Michael O'Connor vs. Parramatta Eels on 20 March 1988 @ Parramatta Stadium
- 10, Matthew Ridge vs. St George Dragons on 3 July 1994 @ Brookvale Oval

=== Most premierships as a captain ===
- 2 - Fred Jones – 1972, 1973
- 1 - Bob Fulton – 1976
- 1 - Max Krilich – 1978
- 1 - Paul Vautin – 1987
- 1 - Geoff Toovey – 1996
- 1 - Matt Orford – 2008
- 1 - Jamie Lyon – 2011

=== Premiership wins as a player ===
- 4 – Graham Eadie, Ian Martin, Terry Randall
- 3 – Bob Fulton, Ray Branighan
- 2 – Ken Irvine, Max Brown, Mal Reilly, John O'Neill, Fred Jones, Bill Hamilton, Tom Mooney, Russel Gartner, Alan Thompson, John Harvey, Max Krilich, Cliff Lyons, Des Hasler, Steve Menzies, Brett Stewart, Michael Robertson, Steve Matai, Jamie Lyon, Brent Kite, Matt Ballin, Anthony Watmough, Glenn Stewart
- 1 – Dennis Ward, Allan Thomson, John Mayes, Peter Peters, John Bucknall, Rod Jackson, Gary Stephens, Phil Lowe, Steve Norton, Gary Thoroughgood, Mark Willoughby, Stephen Knight, Simon Booth, Steve Martin, Bruce Walker, Ian Thomson, Wayne Springall, Dale Shearer, David Ronson, Darrell Williams, Michael O'Connor, Stuart Davis, Paul Vautin, Noel Cleal, Ron Gibbs, Kevin Ward, Mal Cochrane, Phil Daley, Paul Shaw, Mark Pocock, Matthew Ridge, Danny Moore, Craig Innes, Terry Hill, John Hopoate, Nik Kosef, Geoff Toovey, David Gillespie, Jim Serdaris, Mark Carroll, Daniel Gartner, Owen Cunningham, Neil Tierney, Craig Hancock, Steven Bell, David Williams, Matt Orford, Josh Perry, Glen Hall, Heath L'Estrange, Mark Bryant, Jason King, Will Hopoate, Kieran Foran, Daly Cherry-Evan**s**, Joe Galuvao, Tony Williams, Shane Rodney, Jamie Buhrer, Vic Mauro, George Rose

=== Most grand finals as a player ===
- 7 – Graham Eadie including 2 GF appearances in 1978
- 6 – Ian Martin, Terry Randall both played 2 GFs in 1978
- 5 – Bob Fulton, Steve Menzies, Alan Thompson- Alan Thompson played in 2 GFs in 1978
- 4 – Fred Jones, Bill Hamilton, Cliff Lyons, Brett Stewart, Steve Matai, Jamie Lyon, Brent Kite, Anthony Watmough, Glenn Stewart, Max Krilich (incl 2 x GFs in 1978)

=== Rothmans Medal winners ===
- Graham Eadie (1974)
- Mal Cochrane (1986)

=== Dally M Medal winners ===
- Cliff Lyons (1990, 1994)
- Matt Orford (2008)
- **Tom Trbojevic** (2021)

=== Dally M Team of the Year representatives ===
- Fullback - Graham Eadie (1983), Matthew Ridge (1995), **Tom Trbojevic** (2021)
- Wing - John Ribot (1982), Kerry Boustead (1983), **Reuben Garrick*** (2021)
- Centre - Michael O'Connor (1987, 1988), Jamie Lyon (2010, 2011, 2013, 2014), **Dylan Walker*** (2017)
- Five Eighth - Cliff Lyons (1990, 1994)
- Halfback - Matt Orford (2008), Daly Cherry-Evans (2014)
- Front Row - Dave Brown (1983), Martin Bella (1990), Ian Roberts (1993, 1994)
- Second Row - Paul Vautin (1983), Noel Cleal (1984, 1986), Steve Menzies (1994, 1995, 1998), Anthony Watmough (2007, 2009), Glenn Stewart (2008)
- Lock - Des Hasler (1991), Ben Kennedy (2005, 2006)

=== Dally M Captain of the Year ===
- 1982 - Max Krilich
- 1987 - Paul Vautin
- 2006 - Ben Kennedy
- 2012 - Jamie Lyon and Jason King
- 2014 - Jamie Lyon

=== Clive Churchill Medal winners ===
- Dennis Ward^{+} (1972)
- Bob Fulton^{+} (1973)
- Graham Eadie^{+} (1976, 1978)
- Cliff Lyons (1987)
- Geoff Toovey (1996)
- Brent Kite (2008)
- Glenn Stewart (2011)
- Daly Cherry-Evans (2013)

^{+} Retrospective medals, awarded in 2008

=== Player of the Year (Roy Bull Medal) ===
Year	Player
2026	**Haumole Olakau'atu**
2025	**Toluta'u Koula**
2024	**Tom Trbojevic**
2023	Daly Cherry-Evans
2022	Lachlan Croker
2021	**Tom Trbojevic**
2020	Daly Cherry-Evans
2019	**Jake Trbojevic**
2018	**Jake Trbojevic**
2017	Daly Cherry-Evans
2016	**Tom Trbojevic**
2015	**Jake Trbojevic**
2014	Brenton Lawrence
2013	Anthony Watmough
2012	Matt Ballin
2011	Glenn Stewart
2010	Jason King
2009	Jason King
2008	Glenn Stewart
2007	Glenn Stewart
2006	Ben Kennedy
2005	Ben Kennedy
2004	Chris Hicks
2002	Steve Menzies

== Coaching records ==
=== Most games coached ===
- 307, Bob Fulton (1983–1989, 1993–1999)
- 303, Des Hasler (2004–2011, 2019–2022)
- 139, Ron Willey (1962, 1970–1974)
- 123, Frank Stanton (1975–1979)
- 105, Geoff Toovey (2012–2015)
- 98, Ken Arthurson (1957–1961)

=== Most wins as a coach ===
- 205, Bob Fulton (1983–1989, 1993–1999)
- 170, Des Hasler (2004–2011, 2019–2022)
- 97, Ron Willey (1962, 1970–1974)
- 77, Frank Stanton (1975–1979)
- 61, Geoff Toovey (2012–2015)
- 56, Ken Arthurson (1957–1961)

=== Most losses as a coach ===
- 133, Des Hasler (2004–2011, 2019–2022)
- 96, Bob Fulton (1983–1989, 1993–1999)
- 45, Ron Willey (1962, 1970–1974)
- 43, Frank Stanton (1975–1979)
- 43, Geoff Toovey (2012–2015)
- 40, Ken Arthurson (1957–1961)

=== Most grand finals coached ===
- 5, Bob Fulton (1983, 1987, 1995, 1996, 1997)
- 3, Ron Willey (1970, 1972, 1973)
- 3, Des Hasler (2007, 2008, 2011)
- 2, Ken Arthurson (1957, 1959)
- 2, Frank Stanton (1976, 1978)

=== Most premierships as a coach ===
- 2, Ron Willey (1972, 1973)
- 2, Frank Stanton (1976, 1978)
- 2, Bob Fulton (1987, 1996)
- 2, Des Hasler (2008, 2011)

=== Dally M Coach of the Year ===
- 1983 - Bob Fulton

== Club records ==
Effective 5 September 2025

Manly Warringah Sea Eagles
Biggest win	66–0 vs. Canterbury-Bankstown Bulldogs (2021) @ Bankwest Stadium
Biggest loss	6–68 vs. Cronulla-Sutherland Sharks (2005) @ Toyota Park
Consecutive wins	15 (1995)
Consecutive losses	8 (1950 / 1998–1999)
Best winning percentage (10+ games)	Gold Coast Chargers – played 17 / won 14 (82.36%)
Worst winning percentage (10+ games)	St. George Illawarra Dragons – played 40 / won 16 (40.00%)
Clubs (most wins against)	91 – Parramatta Eels
Clubs (most losses to)	73 – South Sydney Rabbitohs
Brookvale Oval record attendance	27,655 vs. Parramatta Eels (1986)
Record attendance	104,583 vs. Newcastle Knights (1999) @ Stadium Australia*
Grand final record attendance	81,988 vs. New Zealand Warriors (2011) @ ANZ Stadium
Brookvale Oval record	Played 728 – (W) 494 / (L) 220 / (D) 14
Home win rate	67.86%
NSWRL/ARL/NRL record	Played 1,757 – (W) 990 / (L) 729 / (D) 38
NSWRL/ARL/NRL finals record	Played 101 – (W) 47 / (L) 52 / (D) 2
Overall win rate	56.35%

NRL double-header also featured Parramatta vs. St. George Illawarra.

=== Biggest wins vs current NRL clubs ===
Margin	Score	Opposition	Venue	Date
66	66–0	Canterbury-Bankstown Bulldogs	Bankwest Stadium	3 July 2021
63	70–7	Penrith	Penrith Park	29 July 1973
56	56–0	Sydney Roosters	Brookvale Oval	7 July 2007
54	54–0	South Sydney Rabbitohs	Brookvale Oval	24 August 1975
54	54–0	Parramatta Eels	Lottoland	18 March 2018
46	52–6	New Zealand Warriors	Brookvale Oval	31 March 2008
44	50–6	Brisbane Broncos	Suncorp Stadium	14 May 2021
42	46–4	North Queensland Cowboys	Brookvale Oval	5 May 1996
42	54–12	Wests Tigers	4 Pines Park	1 September 2023
41	61–20	Canberra Raiders	Brookvale Oval	11 July 1982
40	40–0	Melbourne Storm	ANZ Stadium	5 October 2008
40	58–18	Dolphins	4 Pines Park	9 June 2023
38	48–10; 44–6	Newcastle Knights	Brookvale Oval; 4 Pines Park	15 August 2004; 14 July 2024
36	50–14	Cronulla-Sutherland Sharks	Brookvale Oval	15 April 1984
36	36–0	Gold Coast Titans	Glen Willow Oval	17 April 2021
34	44-10	St. George Illawarra Dragons	Brookvale Oval	28 August 2026

=== Biggest losses vs current NRL clubs ===
Margin	Score	Opposition	Venue	Date
62	6–68	Cronulla-Sutherland Sharks	Toyota Park	21 August 2005
60	12–72	Penrith Panthers	Penrith Stadium	7 August 2004
46	0–46	Sydney City Roosters	Sydney Football Stadium	14 March 1999
44	12–56	Newcastle Knights	EnergyAustralia Stadium	27 June 2004
42	6–48	Canberra Raiders	GIO Stadium Canberra	27 August 2022
40	12–52	Parramatta Eels	Parramatta Stadium	13 June 2004
40	16–56	South Sydney Rabbitohs	ANZ Stadium	22 August 2020
38	0–38	Brisbane Broncos	Suncorp Stadium	13 May 2022
38	4–42	Canterbury-Bankstown Bulldogs	Allianz Stadium	27 July 2025
34	6–40	Melbourne Storm	AAMI Park	30 July 2017
30	18–48; 22–52; 4–34	St. George Illawarra Dragons	WIN Stadium; WIN Stadium; Netstrata Jubilee Stadium	12 July 2009; 23 July 2017; 12 July 2020
26	12–38; 12–38	Wests Tigers	Brookvale Oval; Lottoland	6 April 2003; 15 April 2018
26	10–36	Auckland Warriors	Brookvale Oval	21 March 1999
22	0–22	Dolphins	Brookvale Oval	14 August 2026
20	10–30; 24–44; 8–28	Gold Coast Titans	Cbus Super Stadium; Cbus Super Stadium; Cbus Super Stadium	20 June 2016; 14 August 2022; 13 June 2025
18	12–30	North Queensland Cowboys	Brookvale Oval	20 July 2015

=== Biggest wins vs former clubs ===
Margin	Score	Opposition	Venue	Date
61	61–0	St. George Dragons	Brookvale Oval	3 July 1994
58	66–8	Western Suburbs Magpies	Brookvale Oval	26 March 1994
52	56–4	North Sydney Bears	North Sydney Oval	22 July 1984
51	57–6	Newtown Jets	Henson Park	16 May 1976
46	46–0	Gold Coast Seagulls	Brookvale Oval	15 August 1993
46	56–10	Sydney Tigers	Parramatta Stadium	6 August 1995
34	46–12	South Queensland Crushers	Brookvale Oval	6 July 1997
28	34–6	Illawarra Steelers	Brookvale Oval	12 June 1983
22	32–10	Adelaide Rams	Hindmarsh Stadium	7 August 1998
20	44–24	Western Reds	Brookvale Oval	25 June 1995

=== Biggest losses vs former clubs ===
Margin	Score	Opposition	Venue	Date
50	11–61	St. George	Hurstville Oval	3 May 1947
44	6–50	Newtown	Sydney Cricket Ground	13 June 1955
33	8–41	North Sydney Bears	North Sydney Oval	29 June 1997
31	10–41	Western Suburbs	Pratten Park	26 April 1948
23	6–29	Gold Coast-Tweed Giants	Chris Cunningham Field	2 July 1989
17	0–17; 9–26	Balmain	Leichhardt Oval; Sydney Sports Ground	26 July 1947; 12 May 1968
14	14–28	Illawarra Steelers	Wollongong Showground	2 June 1991
3	8–11	Western Reds	WACA Ground	30 June 1996
–	–	Adelaide Rams	–	–
–	–	South Queensland Crushers	–	–

=== Win % vs current clubs ===
Percentage	Opposition	Games	Wins	Losses	Draws
66.01	Cronulla-Sutherland Sharks	103	68	33	2
62.79	New Zealand Warriors	43	27	15	1
60.69	Sydney Roosters	145	88	55	2
60.29	Canberra Raiders	68	41	26	1
60.00	North Queensland Cowboys	40	24	16	0
60.00	Wests Tigers	40	24	16	0
60.00	Dolphins	5	3	2	0
58.73	Newcastle Knights	63	37	25	1
58.71	Parramatta Eels	155	91	60	4
54.84	Gold Coast Titans	31	17	14	0
54.55	Penrith Panthers	99	54	44	1
53.19	Canterbury-Bankstown Bulldogs	141	75	61	5
52.29	South Sydney Rabbitohs	153	80	73	0
49.06	Brisbane Broncos	53	26	26	1
40.82	Melbourne Storm	49	20	28	1
40.00	St. George Illawarra Dragons	40	16	24	0

=== Win % vs former clubs ===
Percentage	Opposition	Games	Wins	Losses	Draws
100	South Queensland Crushers	4	4	0	0
100	Adelaide Rams	2	2	0	0
82.36	Gold Coast Giants/Seagulls/Chargers	17	14	2	1
70.38	Illawarra Steelers	27	19	6	2
61.04	Newtown Jets	77	47	28	2
60.96	North Sydney Bears	105	64	38	3
58.10	Western Suburbs Magpies	105	61	43	1
50.00	Western Reds	2	1	1	0
49.08	Balmain Tigers	108	53	51	4
41.35	St. George Dragons	104	43	55	6

=== Most consecutive wins ===
- 15, 12 March – 9 July 1995

=== Most consecutive losses ===
- 8, 6 May – 29 July 1950
- 8, 28 August 1998 – 18 April 1999

=== Biggest comeback ===
Recovered from a 20-point deficit.

- Trailed Penrith Panthers 26–6 after 53 minutes to win 36–26 at Brookvale Oval on 29 May 2005

=== Worst collapse ===
Surrendered a 24-point lead.

- Led St George Illawarra Dragons 34–10 after 57 minutes to lose 36–34 at Oki Jubilee Stadium on 29 August 2004

=== Highest attendances vs current NRL clubs ===
Attendance	Opposition	Venue	Date
104,583	Newcastle Knights	Stadium Australia	6 March 1999
81,988*	New Zealand Warriors	ANZ Stadium	2 October 2011
81,491*	Sydney Roosters	ANZ Stadium	6 October 2013
81,392*	Melbourne Storm	Telstra Stadium	30 September 2007
57,343*	Parramatta Eels	Sydney Cricket Ground	18 September 1976
54,255*	South Sydney Rabbitohs	Sydney Cricket Ground	21 September 1968
52,347	Brisbane Broncos	Suncorp Stadium	14 May 2016
52,044*	Cronulla-Sutherland Sharks	Sydney Cricket Ground	15 September 1973
50,714	Canterbury-Bankstown Bulldogs	Accor Stadium	15 September 2024
50,201*	Canberra Raiders	Sydney Cricket Ground	27 September 1987
32,611	North Queensland Cowboys	Sydney Football Stadium	22 September 2007
30,609	Penrith Panthers	Sydney Sports Ground	23 March 1969
27,564	Wests Tigers	ANZ Stadium	23 August 2008
21,374	Gold Coast Titans	Skilled Park	4 July 2008
19,227	St. George Illawarra Dragons	Brookvale Oval	13 September 2008
14,598	Dolphins	4 Pines Park	9 June 2023

* Grand final

=== Highest attendances vs former clubs ===
Attendance	Opposition	Venue	Date
54,399*	St. George Dragons	Sydney Cricket Ground	21 September 1957
41,410	Balmain Tigers	Sydney Cricket Ground	13 September 1969
40,050	Western Suburbs Magpies	Sydney Cricket Ground	8 September 1974
32,878	North Sydney Bears	Sydney Football Stadium	1 September 1991
26,564	Newtown Bluebags	Sydney Cricket Ground	28 April 1956
18,294	Illawarra Steelers	Brookvale Oval	21 August 1992
15,872	Gold Coast Chargers	Carrara Oval	23 August 1997
15,202	South Queensland Crushers	Suncorp-Metway Stadium	28 April 1996
12,655	Western Reds	Brookvale Oval	25 June 1995
7,459	Adelaide Rams	Hindmarsh Stadium	7 August 1998

* Grand final

=== Highest Brookvale Oval attendances vs current NRL clubs ===
Brookvale Oval's spectator capacity as of 2025 is 18,000.

Attendance	Opposition	Date
27,655	Parramatta Eels	31 August 1986
26,168	Canberra Raiders	28 August 1994
25,549	Brisbane Broncos	4 June 1995
23,005	Eastern Suburbs Roosters	6 June 1976
20,793	Penrith Panthers	19 May 1991
20,532	South Sydney Rabbitohs	28 April 1988
20,414	Melbourne Storm	26 August 2011
20,163	Canterbury-Bankstown Bulldogs	25 August 2006
19,227	St. George Illawarra Dragons	13 September 2008
18,588	Auckland Warriors	19 April 1996
18,045	Cronulla-Sutherland Sharks	28 July 1995
17,942	Wests Tigers	12 April 2009
17,298	Newcastle Knights	14 July 2024
16,887	Gold Coast Titans	27 April 2007
14,598	Dolphins	9 June 2023
13,240	North Queensland Cowboys	15 July 2023

=== Highest Brookvale Oval attendances vs former NRL clubs ===
Attendance	Opposition	Date
25,876	Balmain Tigers	30 May 1976
24,381	North Sydney Bears	18 July 1993
23,168	St. George Dragons	26 March 1978
18,294	Illawarra Steelers	21 August 1992
18,056	Western Suburbs Magpies	13 July 1980
16,993	Newtown Bluebags	19 July 1970
12,655	Western Reds	25 June 1995
11,635	Gold Coast Seagulls	2 April 1995
10,616	South Queensland Crushers	16 April 1995
6,434	Adelaide Rams	22 March 1998

=== Grand final attendances ===
Attendance	Opposition	Date	Venue
28,505	South Sydney Rabbitohs	23 September 1951	Sydney Sports Ground
54,399	St. George Dragons	21 September 1957	Sydney Cricket Ground
49,457	St. George Dragons	15 August 1959	Sydney Cricket Ground
54,255	South Sydney Rabbitohs	21 September 1968	Sydney Cricket Ground
53,241	St. George Dragons	19 September 1970	Sydney Cricket Ground
54,537	Eastern Suburbs Roosters	16 September 1972	Sydney Cricket Ground
52,044	Cronulla-Sutherland Sharks	15 September 1973	Sydney Cricket Ground
57,343	Parramatta Eels	18 September 1976	Sydney Cricket Ground
51,510*	Cronulla-Sutherland Sharks	16 September 1978	Sydney Cricket Ground
33,552**	Cronulla-Sutherland Sharks	19 September 1978	Sydney Cricket Ground
52,186	Parramatta Eels	26 September 1982	Sydney Cricket Ground
40,285	Parramatta Eels	25 September 1983	Sydney Cricket Ground
50,201	Canberra Raiders	27 September 1987	Sydney Cricket Ground
41,127	Canterbury-Bankstown Bulldogs	24 September 1995	Sydney Football Stadium
40,985	St. George Dragons	29 September 1996	Sydney Football Stadium
42,482	Newcastle Knights	28 September 1997	Sydney Football Stadium
81,392	Melbourne Storm	30 September 2007	Telstra Stadium
80,388	Melbourne Storm	5 October 2008	ANZ Stadium
81,988	New Zealand Warriors	2 October 2011	ANZ Stadium
81,491	Sydney Roosters	6 October 2013	ANZ Stadium

* Drawn grand final
** Grand final replay

=== Other attendances ===
Attendance	Opposition	Venue	Date	Competition
40,746	South Sydney Rabbitohs	Allegiant Stadium, Las Vegas	2 March 2024	2024 NRL in Las Vegas
36,895	Wigan	Central Park, Wigan	7 October 1987	1987 World Club Challenge
32,569	Leeds Rhinos	Elland Road, Leeds	1 March 2009	2009 World Club Challenge
21,131	Great Britain Lions	Brookvale Oval	7 June 1988	1988 Great Britain Lions tour
21,062	Leeds Rhinos	Headingley Carnegie Stadium, Leeds	17 February 2012	2012 World Club Challenge
15,086	Cronulla-Sutherland Sharks	Leichhardt Oval	10 August 1983	1983 KB Cup Final
14,490	Newtown Jets	Leichhardt Oval	11 August 1982	1982 KB Cup Final

== See also ==
- List of National Rugby League records
