= 1978 NSWRFL season =

Rugby league competition

1978 New South Wales Rugby Football League
- Duration: March 25 – September 19, 1978
- Teams: 12
- Premiers: Manly-Warringah (4th title)
- Minor premiers: Western Suburbs (5th title)
- Matches played: 140
- Points scored: 4375
- Total attendance: 1,582,914
- Top points scorer: Mick Cronin (282)
- Wooden spoon: Newtown Jets (8th spoon)
- Rothmans Medal: Mick Cronin
- Top try-scorer: Larry Corowa (24)

The 1978 NSWRFL season was the 71st season of the NSWRFL Premiership, Sydney's professional rugby league football competition, and Australia's first. Twelve clubs, including six of 1908's foundation teams and another six from around Sydney competed for the J.J. Giltinan Shield and WD & HO Wills Cup during the season, which culminated in a grand final between the Manly-Warringah and Cronulla-Sutherland clubs that was drawn and had to be re-played. NSWRFL teams also competed for the 1978 Amco Cup.

== Season summary ==
This season video citing was introduced for incidents of foul play that are not detected on the field. Twenty-two regular season rounds were played from March till August, resulting in a top five of Western Suburbs, Cronulla-Sutherland, Manly-Warringah, Parramatta and Canterbury-Bankstown who battled it out in the finals.

Mick Cronin set a new record for most points scored by an individual in Australian club rugby league history with his tally of 282 points from 25 games in 1978. This record would stand for another twenty years. He also broke Arthur Oxford's 1920 record for consecutive goals with 26 in a row.

In a tragic accident during the match between Penrith and Newtown at Henson Park on 28 May, rookie Panther prop John Farragher broke his neck in a scrum and was left a quadriplegic.

The 1978 Rothmans Medallist was Parramatta centre Mick Cronin. Rugby League Week gave their player of the year award to Parramatta forward Geoff Gerard.

The 1978 season was also the last in the playing career of future Australian Rugby League Hall of Fame inductee, Ron Coote.

=== Logos ===
For the 1978 season, the New South Wales Rugby Football League introduced a series of logos for each of the clubs competing in the premiership. Clubs that previously had not used a mascot were required to select one to represent their club. The new logos were commissioned by the NSWRFL properties division with Gordon Alexander designing them. Further revision of these logos continued over the next few years. The new logos gave the league a professional and consistent look which was used as the core of its promotional material until the arrival of the Super League. Many of the logos that were designed have become iconic with some being used in an updated form far on into the future.

=== Teams ===
| Team | Logo | Jersey | Season | Home Ground | Coach | Captain |
|---|---|---|---|---|---|---|
| Balmain Tigers | | | 71st season | Leichhardt Oval | Ron Willey | Trevor Ryan |
| Canterbury-Bankstown Bulldogs | | | 44th season | Belmore Sports Ground | Ted Glossop | George Peponis |
| Cronulla-Sutherland Sharks | | | 12th season | Endeavour Field | Norm Provan | Greg Pierce |
| Eastern Suburbs Roosters | | | 71st season | Sydney Sports Ground | Arthur Beetson | Arthur Beetson |
| Manly-Warringah Sea Eagles | | | 32nd season | Brookvale Oval | Frank Stanton | Max Krilich |
| Newtown Jets | | | 71st season | Henson Park | John Raper | Col Casey |
| North Sydney Bears | | | 71st season | North Sydney Oval | Bill Hamilton | Bill Hamilton |
| Parramatta Eels | | | 32nd season | Cumberland Oval | Terry Fearnley | Ray Price |
| Penrith Panthers | | | 12th season | Penrith Park | Don Parish | Ken Wilson |
| South Sydney Rabbitohs | | | 71st season | Redfern Oval | Jack Gibson | Paul Sait; Darrell Bampton |
| St. George Dragons | | | 58th season | Kogarah Oval | Harry Bath | Steve Edge |
| Western Suburbs Magpies | | | 71st season | Lidcombe Oval | Roy Masters | Tom Raudonikis |

== Regular season ==
| Team | 1 | 2 | 3 | 4 | 5 | 6 | 7 | 8 | 9 | 10 | 11 | 12 | 13 | 14 | 15 | 16 | 17 | 18 | 19 | 20 | 21 | 22 | 23 | F1 | F2 | F2R | F3 | GF | GFR |
|---|---|---|---|---|---|---|---|---|---|---|---|---|---|---|---|---|---|---|---|---|---|---|---|---|---|---|---|---|---|
| Balmain Tigers | **PEN** **+8** | NEW +34 | **CBY** **−9** | **PAR** **+6** | **WES** **+10** | MAN −16 | SOU +18 | **NOR**; **0** | CRO −2 | EAS −7 | **STG** **−31** | PEN −6 | **NEW** **+37** | CBY +13 | PAR −15 | WES −28 | **MAN** **+12** | X | **SOU** **−4** | NOR −8 | **CRO** **−15** | **EAS** **−12** | STG +8 | | | | | | |
| Canterbury-Bankstown Bulldogs | **NEW** **+19** | PAR −10 | BAL +9 | **MAN** **+3** | SOU +14 | WES −4 | NOR +5 | **CRO** **+3** | **EAS** **+15** | **STG** **−10** | **PEN**; **0** | NEW +7 | **PAR** **−20** | **BAL** **−13** | MAN +3 | SOU +3 | **WES** **+2** | X | **NOR** **+20** | CRO −10 | EAS −6 | STG +4 | PEN; 0 | PAR −7 | | | | | |
| Cronulla-Sutherland Sharks | **SOU** **+18** | **NOR** **+26** | PAR +2 | **EAS** **+17** | **PEN** **+26** | **STG** **+8** | NEW +12 | CBY −3 | **BAL** **+2** | **MAN** **−19** | WES −18 | SOU −11 | NOR +3 | **PAR** **+10** | EAS −13 | PEN +39 | STG +12 | X | **NEW** **+44** | **CBY** **+10** | BAL +15 | MAN −22 | **WES** **−1** | **MAN** **+5** | WES +4 | X | X | **MAN**; **0** | **MAN** **−16** |
| Eastern Suburbs Roosters | **WES** **+5** | SOU −2 | NOR +5 | CRO −17 | **STG** **+16** | **PAR** **+6** | **PEN** **−2** | NEW +9 | CBY −15 | **BAL** **+7** | MAN −3 | WES −4 | **SOU** **−8** | **NOR** **+10** | **CRO** **+13** | STG −14 | PAR +5 | X | PEN +29 | **NEW** **+9** | **CBY** **+6** | BAL +12 | **MAN** **−10** | | | | | | |
| Manly Warringah Sea Eagles | **STG** **+14** | **PEN** **+7** | **NEW** **+27** | CBY −3 | PAR +12 | **BAL** **+16** | WES −6 | **SOU** **−25** | NOR +1 | CRO +19 | **EAS** **+3** | STG −9 | PEN +23 | NEW +7 | **CBY** **−3** | **PAR** **−1** | BAL −12 | X | **WES** **+6** | SOU +4 | **NOR** **+28** | **CRO** **+22** | EAS +10 | CRO −5 | **PAR**; **0** | **PAR** **+6** | WES +7 | CRO; 0 | CRO +16 |
| Newtown Jets | CBY −19 | **BAL** **−34** | MAN −27 | **WES** **−18** | NOR −11 | SOU −1 | **CRO** **−12** | **EAS** **−9** | STG; 0 | **PEN** **−16** | PAR −29 | **CBY** **−7** | BAL −37 | **MAN** **−7** | WES −19 | **NOR** **+8** | **SOU** **−23** | X | CRO −44 | EAS −9 | **STG** **−31** | PEN +11 | **PAR** **−44** | | | | | | |
| North Sydney Bears | PAR −33 | CRO −26 | **EAS** **−5** | **STG** **−9** | **NEW** **+11** | PEN −1 | **CBY** **−5** | BAL; 0 | **MAN** **−1** | WES −10 | SOU −9 | **PAR** **−22** | **CRO** **−3** | EAS −10 | X | NEW −8 | **PEN** **+52** | STG +14 | CBY −20 | **BAL** **+8** | MAN −28 | **WES** **−1** | **SOU** **−8** | | | | | | |
| Parramatta Eels | **NOR** **+33** | **CBY** **+10** | **CRO** **−2** | BAL −6 | **MAN** **−12** | EAS −6 | STG +8 | **WES** **−1** | PEN +9 | **SOU** **+9** | **NEW** **+29** | NOR +22 | CBY +20 | CRO −10 | **BAL** **+15** | MAN +1 | **EAS** **−5** | X | **STG** **+17** | WES −20 | **PEN** **+24** | SOU +40 | NEW +44 | **CBY** **+7** | MAN; 0 | MAN −6 | | | |
| Penrith Panthers | BAL −8 | MAN −7 | WES −14 | SOU −1 | CRO −26 | **NOR** **+1** | EAS +2 | STG −17 | **PAR** **−9** | NEW +16 | CBY; 0 | **BAL** **+6** | **MAN** **−23** | **WES** **−13** | **SOU** **−8** | **CRO** **−39** | NOR −52 | X | **EAS** **−29** | **STG** **−1** | PAR −24 | **NEW** **−11** | **CBY**; **0** | | | | | | |
| South Sydney Rabbitohs | CRO −18 | **EAS** **+2** | **STG** **+8** | **PEN** **+1** | **CBY** **−14** | **NEW** **+1** | **BAL** **−18** | MAN +25 | **WES**; **0** | PAR −9 | **NOR** **+9** | **CRO** **+11** | EAS +8 | STG −1 | PEN +8 | **CBY** **−3** | NEW +23 | X | BAL +4 | **MAN** **−4** | WES −3 | **PAR** **−40** | NOR +8 | | | | | | |
| St. George Dragons | MAN −14 | WES −11 | SOU −8 | NOR +9 | EAS −16 | CRO −8 | **PAR** **−8** | **PEN** **+17** | **NEW**; **0** | CBY +10 | BAL +31 | **MAN** **+9** | **WES** **+10** | **SOU** **+1** | X | **EAS** **+14** | **CRO** **−12** | **NOR** **−14** | PAR −17 | PEN +1 | NEW +31 | **CBY** **−4** | **BAL** **−8** | | | | | | |
| Western Suburbs Magpies | EAS −5 | **STG** **+11** | **PEN** **+14** | NEW +18 | BAL −10 | **CBY** **+4** | **MAN** **+6** | PAR +1 | SOU; 0 | **NOR** **+10** | **CRO** **+18** | **EAS** **+4** | STG −10 | PEN +13 | **NEW** **+19** | **BAL** **+28** | CBY −2 | X | MAN −6 | **PAR** **+20** | **SOU** **+3** | NOR +1 | CRO +1 | X | **CRO** **−4** | X | **MAN** **−7** | | |
| Team | 1 | 2 | 3 | 4 | 5 | 6 | 7 | 8 | 9 | 10 | 11 | 12 | 13 | 14 | 15 | 16 | 17 | 18 | 19 | 20 | 21 | 22 | 23 | F1 | F2 | F2R | F3 | GF | GFR |

Bold – Home game
X – Bye
Opponent for round listed above margin

=== Ladder ===
| | Team | Pld | W | D | L | PF | PA | PD | Pts |
|---|---|---|---|---|---|---|---|---|---|
| 1 | Western Suburbs | 22 | 16 | 1 | 5 | 426 | 288 | +138 | 33 |
| 2 | Cronulla | 22 | 15 | 0 | 7 | 418 | 261 | +157 | 30 |
| 3 | Manly | 22 | 15 | 0 | 7 | 427 | 287 | +140 | 30 |
| 4 | Parramatta | 22 | 14 | 0 | 8 | 525 | 306 | +219 | 28 |
| 5 | Canterbury | 22 | 13 | 2 | 7 | 307 | 273 | +34 | 28 |
| 6 | Eastern Suburbs | 22 | 13 | 0 | 9 | 337 | 280 | +57 | 26 |
| 7 | South Sydney | 22 | 12 | 1 | 9 | 298 | 300 | -2 | 25 |
| 8 | St. George | 22 | 10 | 1 | 11 | 367 | 354 | +13 | 21 |
| 9 | Balmain | 22 | 9 | 1 | 12 | 337 | 344 | -7 | 19 |
| 10 | Penrith | 22 | 4 | 2 | 16 | 206 | 463 | -257 | 10 |
| 11 | North Sydney | 22 | 4 | 1 | 17 | 325 | 439 | -114 | 9 |
| 12 | Newtown | 22 | 2 | 1 | 19 | 199 | 577 | -378 | 5 |

=== Ladder progression ===
- Numbers highlighted in green indicate that the team finished the round inside the top 5.
- Numbers highlighted in blue indicates the team finished first on the ladder in that round.
- Numbers highlighted in red indicates the team finished last place on the ladder in that round.

| | Team | 1 | 2 | 3 | 4 | 5 | 6 | 7 | 8 | 9 | 10 | 11 | 12 | 13 | 14 | 15 | 16 | 17 | 18 | 19 | 20 | 21 | 22 | 23 |
|---|---|---|---|---|---|---|---|---|---|---|---|---|---|---|---|---|---|---|---|---|---|---|---|---|
| 1 | Western Suburbs Magpies | 0 | 2 | 4 | 6 | 6 | 8 | 10 | 12 | 13 | 15 | 17 | 19 | 19 | 21 | 23 | 25 | 25 | 25 | 25 | 27 | 29 | 31 | 33 |
| 2 | Cronulla-Sutherland Sharks | 2 | 4 | 6 | 8 | 10 | 12 | 14 | 14 | 16 | 16 | 16 | 16 | 18 | 20 | 20 | 22 | 24 | 24 | 26 | 28 | 30 | 30 | 30 |
| 3 | Manly Warringah Sea Eagles | 2 | 4 | 6 | 6 | 8 | 10 | 10 | 10 | 12 | 14 | 16 | 16 | 18 | 20 | 20 | 20 | 20 | 20 | 22 | 24 | 26 | 28 | 30 |
| 4 | Parramatta Eels | 2 | 4 | 4 | 4 | 4 | 4 | 6 | 6 | 8 | 10 | 12 | 14 | 16 | 16 | 18 | 20 | 20 | 20 | 22 | 22 | 24 | 26 | 28 |
| 5 | Canterbury-Bankstown Bulldogs | 2 | 2 | 4 | 6 | 8 | 8 | 10 | 12 | 14 | 14 | 15 | 17 | 17 | 17 | 19 | 21 | 23 | 23 | 25 | 25 | 25 | 27 | 28 |
| 6 | Eastern Suburbs Roosters | 2 | 2 | 4 | 4 | 6 | 8 | 8 | 10 | 10 | 12 | 12 | 12 | 12 | 14 | 16 | 16 | 18 | 18 | 20 | 22 | 24 | 26 | 26 |
| 7 | South Sydney Rabbitohs | 0 | 2 | 4 | 6 | 6 | 8 | 8 | 10 | 11 | 11 | 13 | 15 | 17 | 17 | 19 | 19 | 21 | 21 | 23 | 23 | 23 | 23 | 25 |
| 8 | St. George Dragons | 0 | 0 | 0 | 2 | 2 | 2 | 2 | 4 | 5 | 7 | 9 | 11 | 13 | 15 | 15 | 17 | 17 | 17 | 17 | 19 | 21 | 21 | 21 |
| 9 | Balmain Tigers | 2 | 4 | 4 | 6 | 8 | 8 | 10 | 11 | 11 | 11 | 11 | 11 | 13 | 15 | 15 | 15 | 17 | 17 | 17 | 17 | 17 | 17 | 19 |
| 10 | Penrith Panthers | 0 | 0 | 0 | 0 | 0 | 2 | 4 | 4 | 4 | 6 | 7 | 9 | 9 | 9 | 9 | 9 | 9 | 9 | 9 | 9 | 9 | 9 | 10 |
| 11 | North Sydney Bears | 0 | 0 | 0 | 0 | 2 | 2 | 2 | 3 | 3 | 3 | 3 | 3 | 3 | 3 | 3 | 3 | 5 | 7 | 7 | 9 | 9 | 9 | 9 |
| 12 | Newtown Jets | 0 | 0 | 0 | 0 | 0 | 0 | 0 | 0 | 1 | 1 | 1 | 1 | 1 | 1 | 1 | 3 | 3 | 3 | 3 | 3 | 3 | 5 | 5 |

== Finals ==
Manly finished the regular season in the relatively strong position of equal second with Cronulla, three points behind minor premiers Wests. However after Cronulla beat Manly 17-12 in the qualifying final, every game from that point was a sudden-death fixture for the Sea Eagles.

The second week of finals saw Manly come from 3-13 behind Parramatta to draw 13-13 in the semi-final requiring a mid-week replay. Again in that match Parramatta led (11-2 this time), before Manly stormed home with three late tries in ten minutes to win 17-11. In the week following the game, Parramatta unsuccessfully attempted to have the match annulled and replayed due to Manly scoring a try on what was discovered to be a seventh tackle, a mistake by referee Greg Hartley.

Manly then had to back up a few days later to play a fresh Wests side in the preliminary final. Thus far the Magpies had only played one final to Manly's three. Wests had two tries disallowed by referee Greg Hartley. Manly coach Frank Stanton somehow coaxed a courageous effort out of his exhausted players and on field, five-eighth Alan Thompson was inspirational as they triumphed 14-7 and reached the grand final.

| Home | Score | Away | Match Information |
| Home | Score | Away | Date and Time | Venue | Referee | Crowd |
|---|---|---|---|---|---|---|
Qualifying Finals
| Cronulla-Sutherland | 17-12 | Manly-Warringah | 26 August 1978 | Sydney Cricket Ground | Jack Danzey | 17,718 |
| Parramatta | 22-15 | Canterbury-Bankstown | 27 August 1978 | Sydney Cricket Ground | Greg Hartley | 24,967 |
Semi-finals
| Western Suburbs | 10-14 | Cronulla-Sutherland | 2 September 1978 | Sydney Cricket Ground | Jack Danzey | 22,789 |
| Manly-Warringah | 13-13 | Parramatta | 3 September 1978 | Sydney Cricket Ground | Greg Hartley | 30,850 |
| Manly-Warringah | 17-11 | Parramatta | 6 September 1978 | Sydney Cricket Ground | Greg Hartley | 42,678 |
Preliminary final
| Western Suburbs | 7-14 | Manly-Warringah | 9 September 1978 | Sydney Cricket Ground | Greg Hartley | 27,345 |
Grand final
| Cronulla-Sutherland | 11-11 | Manly-Warringah | 16 September 1978 | Sydney Cricket Ground | Greg Hartley | 51,510 |
Grand final re-play
| Cronulla-Sutherland | 0-16 | Manly-Warringah | 19 September 1978 | Sydney Cricket Ground | Greg Hartley | 33,552 |

=== Chart ===
Qualifying final
2 | Cronulla-Sutherland | 17
3 | Manly | 12
4 | Parramatta | 22
5 | Canterbury | 15

Major semi-final
1 | Western Suburbs | 10
Cronulla-Sutherland | 14
Minor semi-final
Manly | 17*
Parramatta | 11*

Preliminary final
Western Suburbs | 7
Manly | 14

Grand final
Cronulla-Sutherland | 0*
Manly | 16*

* - Indicates only the replay match, and not the match ending in a draw.

=== Grand final ===
| Cronulla-Sutherland | Position | Manly-Warringah |
|---|---|---|
| 1. Mick Mullane | FB | 1. Graham Eadie |
| 2. Rick Bourke | WG | 2. Tom Mooney |
| 3. Steve Rogers (c) | CE | 3. Russel Gartner |
| 6. Dave Chamberlin | CE | 4. Stephen Knight |
| 5. Steve Edmonds | WG | 5. Simon Booth |
| 8. Barry Andrews | FE | 6. Alan Thompson |
| 7. Steve Hansard | HB | 7. Steve Martin |
| 13. Gary Stares | PR | 13. Ian Thomson |
| 12. John McMartin | HK | 12. Max Krilich (c) |
| 11. Paul Khan | PR | 11. John Harvey |
| 10Eric Archer | SR | 10. Bruce Walker |
| 9. Steve Kneen | SR | 9. Terry Randall |
| 18. John Glossop | LK | 8. Ian Martin |
| 15. Rowland Beckett | Reserve | |
| Norm Provan | Coach | Frank Stanton |

In the grand final, Cronulla went to a 9-4 lead in the second half before Manly came back to hit the front 11-9. A Steve Rogers penalty goal squared the scores at 11-11 but he then missed a desperate late field-goal attempt and at full-time the scores remained locked. Thus, for the second consecutive season, the weary grand finalists were required to play a rematch. Although, on this occasion, the NSWRFL were forced to hold the replay three days later on the Tuesday instead of the following weekend due to the imminent 1978 Kangaroo tour, with the Australian team due to leave for England that weekend. The drawn grand final also forced the Australian Rugby League to hold off on naming the touring Kangaroos squad until after the replay, with as many as twelve players from Manly and Cronulla in contention to be selected.

Manly 11 (Tries: Mooney. Goals: Eadie 4.)

Cronulla 11 (Tries: Edmonds. Goals: Rogers 4.)

=== Grand final Replay ===
| Cronulla-Sutherland | Position | Manly-Warringah |
|---|---|---|
| 1. Rick Bourke | FB | 1. Graham Eadie |
| 2. Chris Gardner | WG | 2. Tom Mooney |
| 3. Steve Rogers (c) | CE | 3. Stephen Knight |
| 4. Dave Chamberlin | CE | 4. Russel Gartner |
| 5. Steve Edmonds | WG | 5. Simon Booth |
| 6. Martin Raftery | FE | 6. Alan Thompson |
| 7. Steve Hansard | HB | 7. Steve Martin |
| 13. Paul Khan | PR | 13. Ian Thomson |
| 12. Rowland Beckett | HK | 12. Max Krilich (c) |
| 11. Peter Ryan | PR | 11. John Harvey |
| 10. Steve Kneen | SR | 10. Bruce Walker |
| 9. Eric Archer | SR | 9. Terry Randall |
| 8. John Glossop | LK | 8. Ian Martin |
| | Reserve | 14. Wayne Springall |
| | Reserve | 16. Ray Branighan |
| Norm Provan | Coach | Frank Stanton |

The Tuesday rematch in front of 33,552 was Manly's sixth game in twenty-four days. It was the second Grand final in a row to end up going into a mid-week replay with the 1977 Grand final between St George and Parramatta also needing a re-match to decide the Premiers after the original game had been a 9-9 draw.

In the first half Cronulla had no answer to Graham Eadie's blind-side bursts. His display completely routed the hapless Sharks and Manly went to the break holding a 15-0 lead thanks to a try by Eadie in the scoreboard corner, one he set up for centre Russel Gartner in the same corner, and another 65 metre effort by Gartner after a sweeping backline movement saw him run into open space and easily outpace the Sharks’ defence to score in front of the Sheridan Stand.

The only point in the second half came from a field goal by Eadie.

In the replay, as throughout their finals campaign, Manly were inspired by captain Max Krilich and coach Frank Stanton, their iron-man Terry Randall who had required pain killing injections before every game of the finals just to be able take the field in what Frank Stanton called sheer mind over matter, their cool five eighth Alan Thompson and Man of the Match Graham Eadie.

As of the 2019 NRL Grand final, no player since Eadie has scored the combination of a try, a goal and a field-goal in a grand final.

The refereeing of Greg "Hollywood" Hartley in the replay and throughout the 1978 Finals series attracted criticism from coaches Roy Masters, Jack Gibson and Terry Fearnley, all of whom appealed to the NSWRFL to prohibit Hartley from refereeing their clubs' matches the following season.

Manly-Warringah 16 (Tries: Gartner 2, Eadie. Goals: Eadie 3. Field Goal: Eadie.)

Cronulla-Sutherland 0

Man of the Match: Graham Eadie
Venue: Sydney Cricket Ground
Attendance: 33,552
Referee: Greg Hartley

== Player statistics ==
The following statistics are as of the conclusion of Round 22.

Top 5 point scorers

| Points | Player | Tries | Goals | Field Goals |
|---|---|---|---|---|
| 260 | Mick Cronin | 14 | 109 | 0 |
| 216 | Peter Rowles | 8 | 94 | 4 |
| 133 | Barry Andrews | 5 | 59 | 0 |
| 130 | John Gray | 4 | 59 | 0 |
| 127 | Kevin Stevens | 3 | 59 | 0 |
| 127 | Peter Schofield | 3 | 59 | 0 |

Top 5 try scorers

| Tries | Player |
|---|---|
| 24 | Larry Corowa |
| 14 | Mick Cronin |
| 14 | Mitch Brennan |
| 14 | Peter Craig |
| 12 | Neville Glover |
| 12 | John Ribot |

Top 5 goal scorers

| Goals | Player |
|---|---|
| 109 | Mick Cronin |
| 94 | Peter Rowles |
| 59 | Barry Andrews |
| 59 | John Gray |
| 59 | Kevin Stevens |
| 59 | Peter Schofield |
