= 1978 Eastern Suburbs Roosters season =

Team information
- Captain: Artie Beetson
- Stadium: Sydney Sports Ground
← 1977	1979 →

The 1978 Eastern Suburbs Roosters season was the 71st in the club's history. They competed in the NSWRFL's 1978 Premiership. They also won the 1978 Amco Cup. Their home ground was the Sydney Sports Ground.

== Team line-up ==
Royce Ayliffe, Artie Beetson (Capt-Coach), Ron Coote, Russell Fairfax, Bob Fulton, Mark Harris, Kevin Hastings, Bill Healey, Grant Hedger, Paul Jelfs, John Mackay, Billy Markou, Gary Metcalfe, Gavin Miller, Michael Mossman, Arthur Mountier, Bill Mullins, Joe Reaiche, Terry Murphy, Bob O'Reilly, Ian Schubert, Kevin Stevens

== Ladder ==
	Team	Pld	W	D	L	PF	PA	PD	Pts
1	Western Suburbs	22	16	1	5	426	288	+138	33
2	Cronulla-Sutherland	22	15	0	7	418	261	+157	30
3	Manly-Warringah	22	15	0	7	427	287	+140	30
4	Parramatta	22	14	0	8	525	306	+219	28
5	Canterbury-Bankstown	22	13	2	7	307	273	+34	28
6	Eastern Suburbs	22	13	0	9	377	280	+57	26
7	South Sydney	22	12	1	9	298	300	-2	25
8	St. George	22	10	1	11	367	354	+13	21
9	Balmain	22	9	1	12	337	344	-7	19
10	Penrith	22	4	2	16	206	463	-257	10
11	North Sydney	22	4	1	17	325	439	-114	9
12	Newtown	22	2	1	19	199	577	-378	5

== Season summary ==
- The Rd.1 was a thrilling affair, With the scores locked at 14 all and less than a minute to go Sydney's Daily Mirror gives this description of the events that followed.

"Bob Fulton took the ball near his own quarterline. He put Bob O'Reilly through a gap with a deft pass and O'Reilly found Ron Coote backing up on the outside. Coote scooted down the touch line and when caught by the cover defence passed inside to Ian Schubert. Schubert gained valuable ground before also being picked up. He tried to get a pass away inside but the ball went loose and Stevens raced through to kick it ahead. Wests' winger Trevor Scarr easily won the race for the ball but failed to ground it cleanly. Stevens dived on it for a try and converted as full time sounded" ....

- Easts defeated St George in the final of the Mid-Week Cup. Kevin Hastings was named Mid-week cup player of the year.
