= 1978 Cronulla-Sutherland Sharks season =

- NSWRFL rank: 2nd
- 1978 record: Wins: 17; draws: 1; losses: 8
- Points scored: For: 460 (79 tries, 111 goals, 1 field goal); against: 310 (41 tries, 92 goals, 3 field goals)

Team information
- Coach: Norm Provan
- Captain: Steve Rogers
- Stadium: Endeavour Field
- Avg. attendance: 12,477

Top scorers
- Tries: Mick Mullane (11)
- Goals: Barry Andrews (59)
- Points: Barry Andrews (133)
← 1977	1979 →

The 1978 Cronulla-Sutherland Sharks season was the 12th in the club's history. They competed in the NSWRFL's 1978 Premiership and finished 2nd (out of 15). They then went on to reach the grand final against Manly-Warringah, which had to be replayed and was ultimately lost. The Sharks also competed in the 1978 Amco Cup.

For the end of season 1978 Kangaroo tour, Greg Pierce, who captained City and New South Wales during the season, was selected as vice captain. Steve Kneen and Steve Rogers also went on the tour.

== Ladder ==
	Team	Pld	W	D	L	PF	PA	PD	Pts
1	Western Suburbs	22	16	1	5	426	288	+138	33
2	Cronulla-Sutherland	22	15	0	7	418	261	+157	30
3	Manly-Warringah	22	15	0	7	427	287	+140	30
4	Parramatta	22	14	0	8	525	306	+219	28
5	Canterbury-Bankstown	22	13	2	7	307	273	+34	28
6	Eastern Suburbs	22	13	0	9	377	280	+57	26
7	South Sydney	22	12	1	9	298	300	-2	25
8	St. George	22	10	1	11	367	354	+13	21
9	Balmain	22	9	1	12	337	344	-7	19
10	Penrith	22	4	2	16	206	463	-257	10
11	North Sydney	22	4	1	17	325	439	-114	9
12	Newtown Jets	22	2	1	19	199	577	-378	5
