= 1977 Cronulla-Sutherland Sharks season =

- NSWRFL rank: 6th
- 1977 record: Wins: 13; draws: 0; losses: 9
- Points scored: For: 433 (78 tries, 99 goals, 1 field goal); against: 312 (54 tries, 75 goals)

Team information
- Coach: Ted Glossop
- Captain: Greg Pierce John Maguire John McMartin
- Stadium: Endeavour Field
- Avg. attendance: 8,004

Top scorers
- Tries: Steve Rogers (11)
- Goals: Steve Rogers (56)
- Points: Steve Rogers (146)
← 1976	1978 →

Following are the results of the 1977 Cronulla-Sutherland Sharks season. The Cronulla-Sutherland Sharks are Australian professional Rugby league team based in Cronulla, in the Sutherland Shire, Southern Sydney, New South Wales. They compete in the National Rugby League (NRL), Australasia's premier Rugby league competition.

This was the 11th season in the club's history. They competed in the NSWRFL's 1977 Premiership as well as the 1977 Amco Cup.

== Ladder ==
	Team	Pld	W	D	L	PF	PA	PD	Pts
1	Parramatta	22	19	0	3	448	280	+168	38
2	St. George	22	17	0	5	402	260	+142	34
3	Eastern Suburbs	22	15	1	6	392	207	+185	31
4	Balmain	22	13	2	7	417	288	+129	28
5	Manly-Warringah	22	14	0	8	352	269	+83	28
6	Cronulla-Sutherland	22	13	0	9	433	312	+121	26
7	Canterbury-Bankstown	22	10	1	11	283	239	+44	21
8	North Sydney	22	10	1	11	377	390	-13	21
9	Western Suburbs	22	7	0	15	247	438	-191	14
10	Penrith	22	6	1	15	319	408	-89	13
11	South Sydney	22	3	0	19	250	479	-229	6
12	Newtown Jets	22	2	0	20	254	604	-350	4
