= Simon Booth =

Simon Booth may refer to:

- Simon Booth (rugby league, born 1956), played for Manly and Balmain
- Simon Booth (rugby league, born 1971), played in England in the 1990s
- Simon Booth (runner) (born 1968), British fell runner
- Simon Booth, pseudonym for musician Simon Emmerson (1956–2023)
