= Kenneth Shine =

Kenneth Shine may refer to:

- Kenneth I. Shine (born 1935), American cardiologist, physiologist, and academic administrator
- Kenneth Shine, character in The Alphabet Killer
- Ken Shine, Australian rugby league football coach
