= Allan Thomson (rugby league) =

Australian RL coach and former Australia international rugby league footballer

Personal information
- Born: 18 February 1943 Newcastle, New South Wales, Australia
- Died: 26 September 2006 (aged 63)

Playing information
- Position: Second-row
Club
| Years | Team | Pld | T | G | FG | P |
|---|---|---|---|---|---|---|
| 196?–68 | Lakes United |
| 1969–72 | Manly Sea Eagles | 80 | 8 | 0 | 0 | 24 |
| 1974–75 | Halifax | 8 | 0 | 0 | 0 | 0 |
| | Total | 88 | 8 | 0 | 0 | 24 |
Representative
| Years | Team | Pld | T | G | FG | P |
| 1965–73 | Country Firsts | 6 | 0 | 0 | 0 | 0 |
| 1966–68 | New South Wales | 8 | 0 | 0 | 0 | 0 |
| 1967–68 | Australia | 3 | 0 | 0 | 0 | 0 |

Coaching information
Club
| Years | Team | Gms | W | D | L | W% |
| 1980 | Manly Sea Eagles | 22 | 11 | 2 | 9 | 50 |
Representative
| Years | Team | Gms | W | D | L | W% |
| 1983–86 | Country Firsts | 4 | 0 | 0 | 4 | 0 |
- Relatives: Ian Thomson (nephew)

Allan Kevin Thomson (18 February 1943 – 26 September 2006) was an Australian professional rugby league footballer who played in the 1960s and 1970s, and coached in the 1980s. He played for the Manly-Warringah Sea Eagles in the New South Wales Rugby League (NSWRL) competition.

He is the uncle of rugby league players Ian Thomson and Gary Thomson.

== Career ==
=== Playing ===
Thomson, a tough Second-row forward from the Lakes United club in the Newcastle Rugby League, represented the district in a 14–7 win over the Parramatta Eels in the 1964 State Cup competition. He went on to play for the NSW Colts against the touring French team later that year. In 1966 he made the first of 8 appearances for New South Wales, and a year later made his test debut for Australia in a 22–13 win over New Zealand at the Sydney Cricket Ground. He was retained for the second test against New Zealand at Lang Park in Brisbane which saw a 35–22 win for the Australians.

While still playing for Lakes United in Newcastle, Allan Thomson was selected for the 1967–68 Kangaroo tour at the end of the 1967 season. He played in one test on the tour (his final appearance for Australia), a 16–13 loss to France at the Stade des Minimes in Toulouse, France. He also played in 13 minor games during the tour.

Thomson left Lakes at the end of the 1968 season and linked with NSWRFL club Manly-Warringah in 1969. He was a reserve in the Sea Eagles 23–12 loss to the South Sydney Rabbitohs in the 1970 NSWRFL Grand Final, and went on to play in Manly's first ever premiership win in 1972 when the Sea Eagles defeated Eastern Suburbs 19–14 in the Grand Final at the SCG, partnering Terry Randall in the Second-row.

Following the Grand Final win, Thomson returned to Newcastle to once again play for Lakes United.

Thomson played rugby league in England for Halifax during the 1974–75 season.

=== Coaching ===
Allan Thomson returned to Manly as its first grade coach for the 1980 NSWRFL season. The Sea Eagles ended the 22 round season with an 11-9-2 record and a 6th-place finish, one spot out of the finals. During his coaching at Manly in 1980, Thomson coached 1972 Grand Final teammates Graham Eadie and Terry Randall. He was replaced in 1981 by former Manly player Ray Ritchie.

Thomson, who had represented Country Firsts six times as a player between 1965 and 1973, was appointed coach of the team in 1983. He coached Country in four of the annual City vs Country games from 1983 to 1986, but lost all four games to NSW City.

== Death ==
Allan Thomson died on 26 September 2006.
