= Eric Cain =

Australian rugby league footballer (1954-1984)

Personal information
- Born: 2 March 1954 Coonabarabran, New South Wales, Australia
- Died: 24 April 1984 (aged 30) Coonabarabran, New South Wales, Australia

Playing information
- Position: Wing
Club
Years	Team	Pld	T	G	FG	P
1972	South Sydney	1	1	0	0	3
1978–79	Western Suburbs	36	9	0	0	27
	Total	37	10	0	0	30
- Source: As of 4 January 2023

Eric "Buddy" Cain (1954-1984) was an Australian former professional rugby league footballer who played in the 1970s. He played for Western Suburbs and South Sydney in the NSWRL competition. He was described as an "exciting, yet erratic" player.

== Playing career ==
Cain played his junior rugby league for Zetland in the South Sydney district. He made his first grade debut for South Sydney in round 22 of the 1972 NSWRFL season, the last before the semi-finals. With Souths losing 5 players to the flu, including Bob McCarthy and Denis Pittard, Cain was called upon to play fullback, scoring a try in the 39-22 loss to Wests. Cain made 41 appearances for South Sydney across all grades in his time at the club, but never played first grade with them again.

Six years later, Cain signed for Western Suburbs in 1978. Cain started at fullback before moving to the wing to accommodate John Dorahy. In round 19, he gained attention for a try against Parramatta. Coach Roy Masters said, "Buddy evaded Mick's cover defence and waved him goodbye as he slowed down before scoring a try. When I remonstrated with Buddy for his mocking the venerated Cronin, he argued he was entitled to exuberance."

Cain played 22 games throughout the 1978 NSWRFL season as the club claimed the Minor Premiership. He also played for Wests in the major semi-final loss against Cronulla and the preliminary final defeat to Manly. The following season, Cain played 14 games for Western Suburbs as they again reached the finals. Cain played in their elimination final loss to Canterbury. This would also be Cain's final game in the top grade.

He was said to have died while training after leaving Wests.
