= Don Macdonald =

Australian rugby league referee and administrator

Personal information
- Full name: Donald William Macdonald
- Born: Tempe, New South Wales, Australia
- Died: 12 June 1994 Darlinghurst, New South Wales, Australia

Refereeing information
Years	Competition	Apps
1967–1979	New South Wales Rugby League	156
- Source: rugbyleagueproject.org

Donald William Macdonald (died 12 June 1994) was an Australian rugby league referee and administrator.

== Career ==
Macdonald began his refereeing career in the Newtown District Junior Rugby League. He was subsequently graded to referee in the New South Wales Rugby League (NSWRL) in 1963, gaining his first first-grade match in 1967. He went on to control over 150 top grade matches in a career that lasted until 1979. He controlled one representative match, the 1977 City vs Country match.

Macdonald was a no-nonsense referee who was not averse to sending off players for violent play or dissent, including Craig Young, Johnny Greaves and Ron Raper, Steve Kneen, Kevin Ryan, Paul Sait, Graham Olling and Bill Ashurst.

Macdonald was also involved in some volatile situations after matches, being pelted with fruit and cans by irate spectators, and doused with beer.

After he retired from refereeing, Macdonald was elected as President of the NSWRL Referees Association from 1980 to 1984. He also served on the Referees Examination Board for a number of years.

Macdonald was awarded Life Membership of the NSWRL Referees Association in 1976.
