= Greg Hartley =

Australian rugby league footballer & referee

Personal information
- Full name: Greg Hartley
- Born: 19 July 1942 (age 83) Paddington, New South Wales

Playing information
- Position: Halfback
Club
| Years | Team | Pld | T | G | FG | P |
|---|---|---|---|---|---|---|
| 1967 | Newtown Jets | 1 | 0 | 0 | 0 | 0 |
- Source: As of 27 August 2020

Greg Hartley (born 19 July 1942 in Paddington, New South Wales) is an Australian former referee in the New South Wales Rugby Football League competitions of the late 1970s and early 1980s. Hartley has been described as "perhaps the most colourful and controversial referee in football history".

Hartley began his rugby league career as a player and had three first-grade games with Newtown Jets in 1967 before rupturing his spleen in a reserve-grade match in the same year. He underwent a number of surgeries, spent six months in hospital and retired as a player.

In 1969 he became a referee in the Easts junior league and was graded in 1971. By 1975 he was officiating in the first-grade semi-finals. He was considered the game's top referee of the time, officiating in the 1978, 1979, 1980 and 1981 Grand Finals before retiring in 1982.

He became a football commentator on radio station 2GB and later 2KY, forming a partnership with former Manly player, Peter Peters, which was popularly known as The Decibel Duo and Hollywood and Zorba.
