= Peter Peters (rugby league) =

Australian rugby league footballer, commentator & journalist

Personal information
- Full name: Panoutas Peterides
- Born: 10 June 1947 (age 79) Sydney, New South Wales, Australia

Playing information
- Position: Second-row
Club
Years	Team	Pld	T	G	FG	P
1968	Parramatta	11	1	28	1	61
1969–74	Manly Sea Eagles	73	14	19	0	80
	Total	84	15	47	1	141
- Source: As of 20 June 2019

Peter Peters (Greek: Πανούτας Πετερίδης; born 10 June 1947) is an Australian former professional rugby league footballer, commentator and journalist.

== Playing career ==
He was a first grade player for Parramatta in 1967 and 1968, then transferred to Manly where he played between 1969 and 1974. Peters played in the Sea Eagles’ 1973 premiership winning team. In his six seasons at Brookvale Peters played over 70 grade games.

== Post playing ==
Later he became a rugby league journalist in Fairfax newspapers and football commentator on radio station 2GB before moving to 2KY, forming a partnership with former referee Greg Hartley, which became popularly known as the 'Decibel Duo' and 'Hollywood and Zorba'. Peters was nicknamed 'Zorba' for his Greek ancestry. He was also a panelist on television programme Controversy Corner, hosted by Rex Mossop in the late 1970s.

He later became Media Manager at Manly.

Late in the 2011 NRL season, Peters was stood down by the Manly-Warringah club over a sexist comment made to a female journalist. He twice said to Sky News reporter Megan Barnard, "You're a good sort." He later apologised for the comments, saying, "I'm not a sexist person and I work alongside a lot of women in my job at Manly." He was later returned to the Manly Leagues Club board in 2012.

Peters is well known for his dislike of former NRL side and arch rival North Sydney. In 2018, NSW coach Brad Fittler suggested that Manly-Warringah and Norths should once again merge to form a super club. Peters responded to Fittler's comments by saying "On the way in I saw a couple of flying pigs, and then I checked my diary to see if it was April Fools Day, Never going to happen. It will never happen, not the North Sydney Bears. They want to buy everyone. Gold Coast? Missed out. Brisbane team? Missed out. Perth team? Missed out. Now Manly. They've failed every time".

In 2021 there was talks of North Sydney potentially returning to the NRL once again. Peters was asked by the media what he thought of North Sydney's potential reinstatement with Peters responding with "Everyone's being nice to them but being nice in professional sport doesn’t get you anywhere, they last won a comp in 1922 and that will be the last comp they win. It's gone. They won't be back. They've got as much chance of being in the NRL as I have of flying to the moon backwards on a sky rocket from NASA". Peters also made fun of North Sydney's suggestions of a march to raise awareness of them potentially returning. Peters responded with "Five hundred will turn up…most of them with walking sticks, Two hundred if it rains". On 8 May 2025, North Sydney's partnership with the Western Australian consortium was officially approved by the NRL to become the competition's 18th team ahead of the 2027 NRL season.
