= John Adam (rugby league) =

Australian rugby league footballer (born 1955)

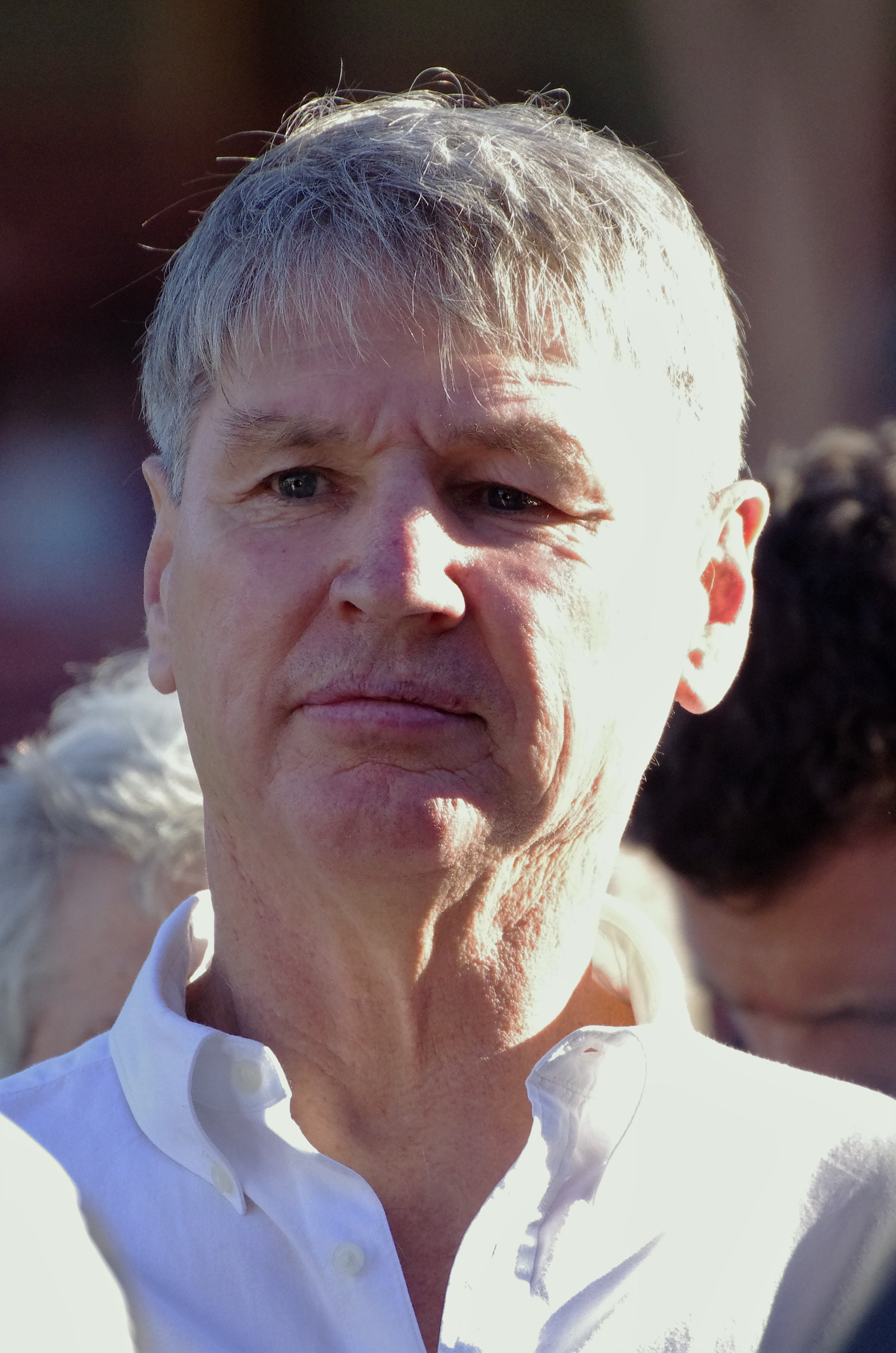

Personal information
- Full name: John Adam
- Born: 22 October 1955 (age 70) Sydney, New South Wales, Australia

Playing information
- Height: 182 cm (6 ft 0 in)
- Weight: 85 kg (13 st 5 lb)
- Position: Centre, Wing
Club
Years	Team	Pld	T	G	FG	P
1977–84	North Sydney Bears	152	44	0	0	139

John Adam (born 22 October 1955, in Sydney, New South Wales) is an Australian former professional rugby league footballer who played in the 1970s and 1980s. He played for the North Sydney Bears in the New South Wales Rugby League competition. His position of choice was as a centre though he could also, and often did, play on the wing.

Adam showed much promise on the sporting field all through his youth, where he played for and captained the New South Wales under 19's rugby league and cricket sides which forced him to make a decision as to which sport he would continue with past his adolescence. He decided on attempting to forge a career in rugby league and after a brief trial with North Sydney in 1977 he was signed on to a permanent role with the club.

Outside of his sporting exploits Adam was a graduate in law from the University of NSW, skills in which after his retirement still became useful in rugby circles where he became the inaugural president of the players association, which later would become the players union.
