= Paul Jelfs =

Australian rugby league footballer

Personal information
- Full name: Paul Jelfs
- Born: 6 May 1952 (age 73)

Playing information
- Position: Lock, Second-row
Club
Years	Team	Pld	T	G	FG	P
1978–80	Eastern Suburbs	20	4	0	0	12
1981	South Sydney	6	1	0	0	3
	Total	26	5	0	0	15

Paul Jelfs (born 6 May 1952) is an Australian former rugby union and professional rugby league footballer who played in the 1970s and 1980s. He played for Sydney's Eastern Suburbs and South Sydney clubs in the New South Wales Rugby League (NSWRL) competition.

Jelfs played in 20 matches for the Eastern Suburbs club before joining South Sydney in 1981 playing in a further 6 matches. Jelfs formerly played rugby union with the Eastern Suburbs rugby union club before switching codes to play rugby league in 1978.
