= Tony Ashworth =

Australian rugby league footballer (died 2019)

Personal information
- Full name: Anthony Francis Ashworth
- Born: 7 November 1954; Sydney, New South Wales, Australia
- Died: 16 April 2019 (aged 64)

Playing information
- Position: Wing
Club
Years	Team	Pld	T	G	FG	P
1978	Manly Sea Eagles	1	1	0	0	3
1979	North Sydney Bears	2	0	0	0	0
	Total	3	1	0	0	3
- Source: As of 18 August 2020

Tony Ashworth (1954−2019) was a former professional rugby league footballer who played during the 1970s. His preferred position was wing.
