= Lindsay Drake =

Australian rugby league footballer (1949–2019)

Personal information
- Full name: Lindsay George Drake
- Born: 7 September 1949 Sydney, New South Wales, Australia
- Died: 21 June 2019 (aged 69) Mona Vale, New South Wales, Australia

Playing information
- Position: Lock
Club
Years	Team	Pld	T	G	FG	P
1970–71	Manly-Warringah	10	4	0	0	12
1972–75	St. George	51	13	0	0	39
1977–79	Manly-Warringah	12	3	0	0	9
	Total	73	20	0	0	60
Representative
Years	Team	Pld	T	G	FG	P
1971	New South Wales	1	1	0	0	3
- Source: As of 26 June 2019

Lindsay George Drake (7 September 1949 – 21 June 2019) was an Australian rugby league footballer who played in the 1970s.

== Playing career ==
A lock forward, Drake was graded with Manly-Warringah Sea Eagles and played two seasons with them between 1970–1971 and played in the 1970 Grand Final. Drake then shifted to St George Dragons for four seasons between 1972 and 1975, his last game being the 1975 Grand Final. He returned to Manly in 1977 and played with them until the end of 1979 before retiring.

Drake represented New South Wales in one game in 1971, that being his only representative appearance.

== Death ==
Drake died on 21 June 2019.
