= Bob Batty =

Australian rugby league footballer

Personal information
- Full name: Robert W. Batty
- Born: 18 January 1939; Murwillumbah, New South Wales, Australia
- Died: 9 June 2004 (aged 65); Sydney, New South Wales, Australia

Playing information
- Position: Fullback, Wing
Club
| Years | Team | Pld | T | G | FG | P |
|---|---|---|---|---|---|---|
| 1959–71 | Manly Warringah | 205 | 40 | 502 | 19 | 1158 |
- Source: seaeagles.com.au

Robert W. "Bob" Batty (18 January 1939 – 9 June 2004) was an Australian rugby league footballer who played in the 1950s, 1960s and 1970s. A prolific goal kicking Fullback (though he started his career on the Wing), Batty played his entire career with the Manly-Warringah Sea Eagles in the New South Wales Rugby Football League premiership.

== Career ==
A product of Murwillumbah in far north-eastern New South Wales, Batty came to the Sea Eagles in 1958 and made his first grade debut for the club on 3 May 1959 against Newtown at Brookvale Oval. He kicked two goals on the day, though Manly were beaten 15-11.

Playing behind representative fullback and club captain Ron Willey, Batty played mostly in Reserve Grade for Manly, winning the Reserves premiership in 1960 before getting his chance when Willey moved to Parramatta in 1963.

With Willey's departure, Batty moved permanently into the fullback role and also took on the goal kicking duties for the first grade side. He would be a fixture in the Manly side until his retirement after a trial game before the 1972 season, making way for 18 year old goal kicking fullback Graham Eadie to take over the role. After making his debut against Newtown at Brookvale in 1959, Batty's last regular premiership game for Manly-Warringah was also against Newtown at Brookvale Oval in the final round of the 1971 season. As he did on debut, he kicked two goals on the day though this time around Manly would win the game 25-5. He would then appear in two Finals games, the last being a 15-12 loss to St George in the 1971 Preliminary Final at the Sydney Cricket Ground.

A reliable last line of defence for Manly-Warringah, Batty played in the club's losing Grand Final to powerhouse club South Sydney in 1968. Manly-Warringah would again face Souths in 1970, with again South Sydney emerging victorious.

Batty became the first Manly-Warringah player to play over 200 games and score over 1,000 points for the club. He finished his career with a then club record 205 games and 1,158 points (40 tries, 502 goals and 19 field goals). As of the end of 2024, Batty's point scoring tally for Manly still sees him sitting fourth on the club's all-time list behind Graham Eadie, Jamie Lyon, and Reuben Garrick.

Batty also played 52 reserve grade games for Manly, scoring 23 tries and 45 goals. He was the 127th player to play first grade for Manly-Warringah and was made a life member of the club in 1973.

== Death ==
Bob Batty died on 9 June 2004 at the age of 65 after collapsing while working at Bunnings in the Sydney suburb of Terrey Hills.

In his honor, the Manly-Warringah Sea Eagles NSW Cup (Reserve Grade) Best and Fairest award is named the "NSW Cup Bob Batty Best and Fairest".
