= Eric Ferguson (rugby league) =

Australian rugby league footballer

Personal information
- Born: 11 May 1955 (age 69); Casino, New South Wales, Australia

Playing information
- Position: Fullback, Wing
Club
| Years | Team | Pld | T | G | FG | P |
|---|---|---|---|---|---|---|
| 1974–77 | Eastern Suburbs | 10 | 3 | 2 | 0 | 13 |
| 1978–81 | South Sydney | 33 | 4 | 116 | 0 | 244 |
| | Total | 43 | 7 | 118 | 0 | 257 |

Eric Ferguson (born 11 May 1955) is an Australian former professional rugby league footballer who played for Eastern Suburbs and the South Sydney Rabbitohs.

== Biography ==
An Indigenous Australian, Ferguson grew up as the middle sibling of nine children and lived in the New South Wales towns of Rappville, Byron Bay and Griffith. He played his early rugby league for Yenda, captaining the under 18s in 1968. While playing in Newcastle he was recruited by Eastern Suburbs.

Ferguson, a fullback and occasional winger, played first-grade for Eastern Suburbs from 1974 to 1977, but didn't feature regularly.

At South Sydney he received more time in first-grade and became a reliable goal-kicker for the club. In a 1978 game against Cronulla he kicked nine goals from nine attempts. He helped South Sydney make the finals in 1980, kicking the winning sideline conversion against North Sydney in Round 19, with less than two-minutes to play. South Sydney ultimately edged into the finals by a point and Ferguson made his only finals appearances against St. George at the SCG.
