= Col Casey =

Australian rugby league footballer and coach

Personal information
- Full name: Colin Casey
- Born: 10 March 1949 (age 77) Erskineville, New South Wales, Australia

Playing information
- Position: Prop
Club
Years	Team	Pld	T	G	FG	P
1970–78	Newtown Jets	113	7	0	0	21
- Source: Whiticker/Hudson

Colin Casey (born 10 March 1949) is an Australian former rugby league footballer who played in the 1970s.

Col Casey was a Newtown junior, who came through the ranks to play for the Newtown Jets for nine seasons, and became the Newtown club captain in the late 1970s. Col Casey was a tough forward, who was a favourite of all Newtown fans during his long career. He won the reserve grade premiership with Newtown in 1970, and featured in many great performances for the club over the years. He retired from Newtown in 1979 and took up a captain-coach position at Campbelltown, New South Wales.

In 1982-83 Casey coached Woy Woy, with the side winning the minor premiership but losing the grand final to Wyong in his first season.
