= Steve Hansard =

Australian rugby league footballer

Personal information
- Full name: Stephen Charles Hansard
- Born: 28 August 1953 (age 72); Sydney, New South Wales, Australia

Playing information
- Position: Five-eighth, Halfback
Club
Years	Team	Pld	T	G	FG	P
1972	Cronulla-Sutherland	5	0	0	0	0
1973–76	Newtown	67	21	5	1	74
1977–81	Cronulla-Sutherland	70	12	0	0	36
	Total	142	33	5	1	110
- Source: Whiticker/Hudson

Stephen Charles Hansard (born 28 August 1953) is an Australian former rugby league footballer who played in the 1970s and 1980s.

== Playing career ==
Hansard was a halfback and five-eighth with the Newtown club and Cronulla-Sutherland Sharks in the 1970s. He played halfback for the Sharks in the 1978 Grand Final & 1978 Grand Final replay. A whole-hearted player, Steve Hansard retired from first grade football at the conclusion of the 1981 NSWRFL season.
