= Paul Khan =

Australian rugby league footballer

Personal information
- Born: 23 June 1951 (age 75) Brisbane, Queensland, Australia

Playing information
- Position: Prop
Club
Years	Team	Pld	T	G	FG	P
19??–??	Easts (Brisbane)
1974–75	Norths (Brisbane)
1976–77	Castleford
1975–81	Cronulla-Sutherland	120	14	0	0	42
1982–??	Easts (Brisbane)
	Total	120	14	0	0	42
Representative
Years	Team	Pld	T	G	FG	P
1973	Queensland	1	0	0	0	0
1978	New South Wales	1	0	0	0	0
1981–82	Queensland Maroons	4	0	0	0	0
- Source: As of 15 November 2010

Paul Khan (born 23 June 1953) is an Australian former rugby league footballer who played in the 1970s and 1980s. He was a state representative for both New South Wales and Queensland with his first grade club career played with the Cronulla-Sutherland Sharks.

== Club and representative career ==
While playing for Queensland Colts, in 1973 Khan was selected for Queensland in the interstate series against New South Wales. He was graded in 1974 with Brisbane Norths whose coach Tommy Bishop recommended him to the Cronulla-Sutherland Sharks in Sydney where he spent the 1975 season. He had a stint in England with Castleford in 1976-1977 and returned to Cronulla for the 1978 season and played in that year's Grand Final and the Grand Final Replay. He played further seasons with Cronulla up till the end of 1981 totalling 120 appearances for the club. Khan was a major player in the Sharks' 26-5 smashing of Combined Brisbane in the 1979 Amco Cup – Cronulla's only piece of silverware to this point.

The ball-playing Khan returned to Brisbane in 1982 for a season with Brisbane Easts where he was part of the club's 23-15 Winfield State League Final win over Redcliffe at Lang Park. He moved to the John Barber-coached Redcliffe Dolphins the following season where he ended up playing in a losing BRL Grand Final side (Easts beating Redcliffe 14–6).

He was first selected for NSW in 1978 under the residential criteria. In the single 1981 State of Origin match played under the new Origin selection criteria he was one of four New South Wales based players called on by Queensland. He played in all three games of the 1982 series.

He is one of the relatively rare number of players to have represented both Queensland and New South Wales.
