= Ken Shine =

Australian rugby league footballer and coach (1947–2026)

Personal information
- Born: 22 November 1947 Newcastle, New South Wales, Australia
- Died: 4 June 2026 (aged 78) Sydney, New South Wales, Australia

Coaching information
Club
| Years | Team | Gms | W | D | L | W% |
| 1994–1997 | South Sydney | 85 | 22 | 4 | 59 | 26 |
- Source: As of 19 February 2019

Ken Shine (22 November 1947 – 4 June 2026) was an Australian rugby league player and coach. He was head coach of the South Sydney Rabbitohs in the National Rugby League.

== Biography ==
Shine replaced coach Bob McCarthy after McCarthy stepped down from the coaching role in Round 3 of the 1994 season.

At the time, Souths had just come off a strong pre season where they defeated the Brisbane Broncos 27–26 in a huge upset to win the Tooheys Challenge Cup.

In Shine's first season at coach, he took Souths on a seven-game winning streak and the club looked on track to qualify for the finals for the first time since their minor premiership win in 1989, but a major drop in form saw Souths lose eight of their last nine games.

He coached Souths up until the end of 1997 season until he was replaced by former North Sydney Bears coach Steve Martin.

Shine died in Sydney on 4 June 2026, at the age of 78.
