= Chris Montgomery (rugby league) =

Australian rugby league footballer

Personal information
- Full name: Christopher Montgomery
- Born: 1 July 1958 (age 68)

Playing information
- Position: Wing, Fullback
Club
Years	Team	Pld	T	G	FG	P
1977–79	Manly Sea Eagles	10	1	1	0	5
1980	North Sydney	3	1	0	0	3
1981	Manly Sea Eagles	7	3	0	0	9
1982	Illawarra Steelers	10	0	0	0	0
1983	Manly Sea Eagles	1	0	0	0	0
	Total	31	5	1	0	17
- Source: As of 26 February 2019

Chris Montgomery is an Australian former professional rugby league footballer who played in the 1970s and 1980s. Montgomery was a foundation player for Illawarra playing in the club's first game.

== Playing career ==
Montgomery made his first grade debut for Manly-Warringah in Round 17 1977 against Eastern Suburbs at the Sydney Cricket Ground.

In 1978, Montgomery made 6 appearances but was not a part of the premiership winning team which defeated Cronulla-Sutherland in the grand final replay.

In 1980, Montgomery joined arch rivals North Sydney and scored a try on debut for the club. Montgomery returned to Manly in 1981 before departing the club once again.

In 1982, Montgomery joined newly admitted Illawarra and played in the club's first ever game which was against Penrith at WIN Stadium and ended in a 17–7 loss. Montgomery made 10 appearances for Illawarra in their inaugural season but scored no tries.

Montgomery returned to Manly in 1983 for a third spell with them before retiring at the end of the season.
