= Gary Stares =

Australian rugby league footballer

Personal information
- Full name: Gary Stares
- Born: Sydney, New South Wales, Australia

Playing information
- Position: Prop, Second-row, Lock
Club
Years	Team	Pld	T	G	FG	P
1978–84	Cronulla-Sutherland	35	2	0	0	6
- Source: As of 13 April 2019

Gary Stares is an Australian former rugby league footballer who played in the 1970s and 1980s. He played for Cronulla-Sutherland in the New South Wales Rugby League (NSWRL) competition.

== Playing career ==
Stares made his first grade debut for Cronulla in Round 10 1978 against Manly-Warringah scoring a try in a 27–8 loss. In the same year, Cronulla finished 2nd on the table and qualified for the finals. Cronulla defeated Manly in the opening week of the finals series 17–12. Cronulla then defeated minor premiers Western Suburbs to reach their second grand final against Manly.

In the Grand Final, Stares played at prop in only his 6th game as Cronulla went to a 9–4 lead in the second half before Manly came back to hit the front 11–9. A Steve Rogers penalty squared it at 11-all but he then missed a desperate late field-goal attempt and at full-time the scores remained locked in front of 51,000 fans. Just 3 days later, Cronulla and Manly were required to contest a grand final replay to declare a winner as the Australian team had been announced the same week and were heading to England. This meant that the grand final replay would need to be played as soon as possible due to players from both teams potentially earning selection.

Stares missed out on playing in the grand final replay as Manly prevailed 16-0 winning their fourth premiership in front of a low crowd of 33,552 at the Sydney Cricket Ground. Stares played on with Cronulla until the end of the 1984 season before retiring.
