= Ted Glossop =

Australian RL coach and former rugby league footballer

Personal information
- Full name: Edwin Charles Glossop
- Born: 1934; Sydney, New South Wales, Australia
- Died: 31 December 1998 (aged 64); Caringbah, New South Wales, Australia

Playing information
- Position: Halfback
Club
Years	Team	Pld	T	G	FG	P
1951–57	St. George	115	17	0	0	51

Coaching information
Club
Years	Team	Gms	W	D	L	W%
1977	Cronulla Sharks	22	13	0	9	59
1978–83	Canterbury	148	86	5	57	58
1988	St. George Dragons	22	9	0	13	41
	Total	192	108	5	79	56
Representative
Years	Team	Gms	W	D	L	W%
1980–1983	New South Wales	8	2	0	6	25

Ted Glossop (1934 – 31 December 1998) was an Australian rugby league footballer and coach.

== Playing career ==
He played for the St. George Dragons for eight seasons between 1950 and 1958 and played 115 games for the club scoring 17 tries. He retired after the 1958 Third Grade grand final.

== Club and state coaching career ==
He then went on to become a first-grade coach with Cronulla-Sutherland, a Premiership-winning coach with Canterbury-Bankstown in the 1980 NSWRFL season and lastly he coached St. George to a victory in the 1988 Panasonic Cup.

Glossop is also remembered as the inaugural coach of the New South Wales State of Origin team from 1980 to 1981, being (replaced by Frank Stanton in 1982) and returning for the 1983 series.

== Personal life ==
His son, John Glossop, was a first grade player with the Cronulla-Sutherland Sharks (1975-1983).

Glossop was also a high school teacher and principal. He was promoted from deputy principal at Gymea High School to principal of Picnic Point High School in 1979. He returned to Gymea High School as principal in the late 1980s. As a student he attended Canterbury Boys' High School.

== Death ==
Glossop died after losing a battle with cancer in 1998.
