= Dave Chamberlin =

Australian rugby league footballer

Personal information
- Full name: David Chamberlin
- Born: 10 May 1955 (age 71) Sydney, New South Wales, Australia

Playing information
- Position: Centre, Wing
Club
Years	Team	Pld	T	G	FG	P
1974–80	Cronulla-Sutherland	85	45	0	0	135
- Source: As of 13 April 2019

Dave Chamberlin is an Australian former rugby league footballer who played in the 1970s and 1980s. He played for Cronulla-Sutherland in the New South Wales Rugby League (NSWRL) competition.

== Background ==
Chamberlin played junior rugby league for Cronulla-Caringbah.

== Playing career ==
Chamberlin made his first grade debut for Cronulla in 1974. In 1977, Chamberlin finished as the club's second highest try scorer for the season with 10 tries. In 1978, Chamberlin scored 10 tries in 19 games as Cronulla finished 2nd on the table and qualified for the finals. Cronulla defeated Manly in the opening week of the finals series 17-12. Cronulla then defeated minor premiers Western Suburbs to reach their second grand final against Manly.

In the Grand Final, Chamberlin played at centre partnering Steve Rogers as Cronulla went to a 9-4 lead in the second half before Manly came back to hit the front 11-9. A Steve Rogers penalty squared it at 11-all but he then missed a desperate late field-goal attempt and at full-time the scores remained locked. Just 3 days later, Cronulla and Manly were required to contest a grand final replay to declare a winner as the Australian team had been announced the same week and were heading to England. Both Manly and Cronulla went into the replay with tired players but it was Manly who prevailed in the replay 16-0 winning their fourth premiership in front of a low crowd of 33,552.

Chamberlain retired at the end of the 1980 season scoring 45 tries in 85 games.
