= Ian Thomson (rugby league) =

Australia international rugby league footballer

Personal information
- Born: 12 July 1955 (age 71)

Playing information
- Position: Prop
Club
Years	Team	Pld	T	G	FG	P
1975–76	Queanbeyan
1977–80	Manly-Warringah	82	10	0	0	30
1981	Balmain Tigers	9	0	0	0	0
1982–86	Manly-Warringah	31	4	0	0	14
	Total	122	14	0	0	44
Representative
Years	Team	Pld	T	G	FG	P
1976	NSW Country	1	0	0	0	0
1978	NSW City	1	0	0	0	0
1978	New South Wales	3	1	0	0	3
1978	Australia	3	0	0	0	0
- Relatives: Allan Thomson (uncle)

Ian Thomson (born 12 July 1955) is an Australian former professional rugby league footballer who played in the 1970s and 1980s. An Australian international and New South Wales interstate representative front row forward, he played club football for Manly-Warringah, with whom he won the 1978 NSWRFL Premiership, as well as Balmain.

== Playing career ==
Thomson came from a footballing family: his father Jim and brother Gary were both Balmain players. His uncle, Allan Thomson was an Australian international. Ian played President's Cup for Balmain in 1974. He then spent two seasons with Queanbeyan under coach Don Furner, earning representative honours with Country Firsts in 1976. He returned to Sydney, signing with Manly-Warringah for the 1977 NSWRFL season. The following year he represented New South Wales and was first selected to play for Australia in the first test against New Zealand. The 1978 NSWRFL season's Grand Final was to be played by the Manly-Warringah and Cronulla-Sutherland clubs. The game ended in a draw and resulted in a re-play which was won by Manly-Warringah, with Thomson playing in both matches. After that he went on the 1978 Kangaroo tour.

In the second-last round of the 1980 regular season, Thomson was sent off for a high tackle and was subsequently suspended by the judiciary for the rest of the season.

In November 1980 Thomson agreed to play for two seasons with the Balmain Tigers, however he played only one season. The following year he returned to the Sea Eagles and reached the Grand Final which was eventually lost to the Parramatta Eels.

In 1983 Thomson broke his arm in the first minute of a mid-season match against Eastern Suburbs which resulted in a further break, four operations and the insertion of a steel plate, in 1984 Ian mode to England Rugby Club, Swinton Lions, where he represented Swinton Lions in the position of prop forward, playing 12 times, before moving back to Australia. eventually forcing his retirement in 1986. He then started coaching in the Newcastle area.

== Post playing ==
In 2000 Thomson was appointed Chairman of the newly formed Northern Eagles club, overseeing the demise of the merger with the North Sydney Bears at the end of 2001 and the reversion of the franchise to the Manly-Warringah Sea Eagles. Thomson continued on at Manly, becoming Chief Executive.
