= Bruce Walker (rugby league) =

Australian rugby league footballer

Personal information
- Born: 8 June 1952 (age 74)

Playing information
- Position: Prop, Second-row, Lock
Club
Years	Team	Pld	T	G	FG	P
	Easts Tigers
1971–77	North Sydney	141	36	0	0	102
1978–83	Manly-Warringah	85	14	0	0	42
	Total	226	50	0	0	144
Representative
Years	Team	Pld	T	G	FG	P
1975	New South Wales	1	0	0	0	0
1978	Australia	0	0	0	0	0
1982	Queensland	1	0	0	0	0

Bruce Walker (born 8 June 1952) is an Australian former rugby league footballer who played in the 1970s and 1980s. He attended Villanova College at Coorparoo.

== Playing career ==
An Australian Kangaroos and Queensland Maroons representative second-row or lock forward, he played club football in Brisbane with Eastern Suburbs before moving to Sydney to play with North Sydney for seven seasons between 1971 and 1977, and later Manly-Warringah with whom he won the 1978 Grand Final and played for six seasons between 1978 and 1983. Walker was then selected to go on the 1978 Kangaroo tour, playing in 8 matches.

== Post playing ==
Following his retirement as a player Walker became chairman of the South Australian Rugby League.
