= Steve Martin (rugby league) =

Australian RL coach and former rugby league footballer

Personal information
- Full name: Steven Martin
- Born: 7 January 1957 (age 69) Wagga Wagga, New South Wales, Australia

Playing information
- Height: 165 cm (5 ft 5 in)
- Weight: 70 kg (11 st 0 lb)
- Position: Halfback, Centre
Club
Years	Team	Pld	T	G	FG	P
1975–76	Barrow
1978–81	Manly-Warringah	70	21	0	2	65
1982–84	Balmain	53	10	0	1	38
1983–84	Leeds	25	4	0	0	16
	Total	148	35	0	3	119
Representative
Years	Team	Pld	T	G	FG	P
1978–80	New South Wales	2	1	0	0	3
1978–80	Australia	1	0	0	0	0

Coaching information
Club
Years	Team	Gms	W	D	L	W%
1990–92	North Sydney	69	35	2	32	51
1993–94	Featherstone Rovers	76	44	3	29	58
1998	South Sydney	18	3	0	15	17
	Total	163	82	5	76	50

Steve Martin (born 7 January 1957) is an Australian former professional rugby league footballer who played in the 1970s and 1980s, and coached in the 1990s. He was a representative player at both state and international levels and played in the New South Wales Rugby League (NSWRL) competition for Manly-Warringah Sea Eagles, and the Balmain Tigers. Martin primarily played in the halfback position.

== Playing career ==
Martin was originally an Australian Rules footballer in Wagga Wagga, New South Wales but switched to rugby league with Wagga Wagga Kangaroos. He spent 1975–1976 playing for Barrow in English club football. He came to the notice of first-grade clubs in Australia when he represented Riverina in the 1976 Amco Cup competition.

Martin débuted for Manly in 1978 and was selected for New South Wales as five-eighth. In the same year he played in both the grand final, and the grand final replay win over Cronulla. Martin finished his début season as the NSWRL Rookie of the Year. He was then selected to go on the 1978 Kangaroo tour, playing in eleven tour matches and one Test against France.

Martin was selected to represent New South Wales as an interchange for the inaugural State of Origin game in 1980.

After several positional changes at Manly, Martin moved to Balmain in an effort to consolidate his career at halfback but a series of shoulder injuries kept him from his previous form. In 1983–1984, Martin played for Leeds in England.

== Coaching career ==
In 1986–1987, Martin captain-coached West Tamworth to two premierships but two shoulder dislocations forced his retirement as a player. Moving to the North Sydney Bears in 1990, Martin coached the club to the 1991 preliminary-final but they lost to the Canberra Raiders.

1992 was a disappointing season for the Bears and Martin resigned at the end of the year, being succeeded by Peter Louis. An appointment as coach of Featherstone Rovers in England followed before Martin returned once more to Australia and took up the coaching position at the South Sydney Rabbitohs in 1998 replacing the outgoing Ken Shine. His tenure at the club was brief. Martin was sacked after a disagreement over the disciplining of controversial five-eighth, Julian O'Neill, late in the season and handed the position over to Craig Coleman.
