= Rowland Beckett =

Australian rugby league footballer

Personal information
- Full name: Rowland Beckett
- Born: Brisbane, Queensland, Australia

Playing information
- Position: Hooker
Club
Years	Team	Pld	T	G	FG	P
1976–1983	Cronulla-Sutherland	79	14	0	0	50
1984	Eastern Suburbs	11	2	0	0	8
	Total	90	16	0	0	58
- Source: As of 27 June 2019

Rowland Beckett is an Australian former rugby league footballer who played for Cronulla-Sutherland and Eastern Suburbs in the New South Wales Rugby League premiership competition; his position of choice was at hooker.

He played eight seasons at Cronulla between 1976 and 1983. He finished his career at Eastern Suburbs in 1984.

== Career highlights ==
- Junior Club: Como Jannali Rugby League Football Club
- Career Stats: 84 career games to date scoring 58 points
