= Steve Edmonds =

Australian rugby league footballer (1954–2026)

Personal information
- Full name: Steven William Edmonds
- Born: 4 March 1954 Sydney, New South Wales, Australia
- Died: 21 August 2026 (aged 72)

Playing information
- Position: Wing
Club
Years	Team	Pld	T	G	FG	P
1972–1981	Cronulla-Sutherland	116	45	13	0	161
1974–1975	Halifax	13	1	0	0	3
	Total	129	46	13	0	164

Steven William Edmonds (4 March 1954 – 21 August 2026), nicknamed Rock, was an Australian rugby league footballer who played in the 1970s and 1980s. He played for Cronulla-Sutherland in the New South Wales Rugby League (NSWRL) competition.

== Playing career ==
Edmonds made his first grade debut for Cronulla in 1972. In 1973, Edmonds played in three of Cronulla's finals games as the club reached their first grand final. Edmonds missed out on selection in the match as he was ruled out with an injury. Cronulla went on to lose the grand final 10–7.

He played rugby league in England for Halifax during the 1974–75 season.

In 1978, Cronulla finished second in the table and qualified for the finals. Cronulla defeated Manly in the opening week of the finals series 17–12. Cronulla then defeated minor premiers Western Suburbs to reach their second grand final against Manly.

In the Grand Final, Edmonds played on the wing as Cronulla went to a 9–4 lead in the second half as Edmonds scored a try in the corner before Manly came back to hit the front 11–9. A Steve Rogers penalty tied the match at 11 but he then missed a late field-goal attempt and at full-time the scores remained locked in front of 51,000 fans. Three days later, Cronulla and Manly were required to contest a grand final replay to declare a winner as the Australian team had been announced the same week and were heading to England. Both Manly and Cronulla went into the replay with tired players but it was Manly who prevailed in the replay 16–0 winning their fourth premiership in front of a crowd of 33,552.

In 1979, Edmonds finished as top try scorer for Cronulla with 13 tries. Edmonds retired at the end of the 1981 season and at the time was one of the club's longest serving players.

== Post retirement ==
Edmonds was nominated in the Cronulla "Team of the Half Century" acknowledging the club's best players from 1967 to 2016.

Edmonds died on 21 August 2026, at the age of 72.
