= Peter Schofield (rugby league) =

Australian rugby league footballer

Personal information
- Born: 29 September 1953 (age 71); Young, New South Wales, Australia

Playing information
- Position: Fullback, Wing, Centre
Club
Years	Team	Pld	T	G	FG	P
1978–79	North Sydney Bears	38	7	64	0	149
1980	Penrith Panthers	12	1	39	0	81
	Total	50	8	103	0	230

Peter Schofield is an Australian former professional rugby league footballer who played in the 1970s and 1980s. He played for the North Sydney Bears and Penrith Panthers, as a fullback, wing or centre.

== Background ==
Schofield was raised in the New South Wales town of Young and was recruited to North Sydney via Dapto.

== Playing career ==
A utility back, Schofield played two seasons of first-grade at North Sydney. In 1978 he featured in a variety of positions and was the club's first choice goal-kicker, amassing 127 points for the season. He was a member of the North Sydney side which won the 1978 Challenge Cup, a post season competition. The following season he was replaced as goal-kicker by new recruit Rod Henniker and spent the entire season as a fullback. He was one of North Sydney's captains in 1979.

In the 1980 NSWRFL season he was picked up by Penrith, where he played as a centre and winger in what was his only year at the club.
