= Barry Andrews (rugby league) =

Australian rugby league footballer (born 1950)

Personal information
- Full name: Barry Andrews
- Born: 15 October 1950 (age 75)

Playing information
- Position: Five-eighth
Club
Years	Team	Pld	T	G	FG	P
1971–79	Cronulla-Sutherland	112	17	303	0	657
1980	Eastern Suburbs	11	3	32	0	73
1980	→Hull Kingston Rovers	4	0	4	0	8
	Total	127	20	339	0	738

Barry Andrews (born in 1950) is a former professional rugby league footballer who played for Cronulla-Sutherland and Eastern Suburbs in the New South Wales Rugby League (NSWRL) competition.

== Playing career ==
Barry Andrews, a five-eight and prolific goal-kicker, played nine seasons with Cronulla-Sutherland between 1971-1979 and is the fourth highest points scorer for the club. Nicknamed 'Panda', he is currently the 5th highest first grade scorer with 657 points.

He was a member of the Cronulla Sharks grand final team that drew the 1978 Grand Final against Manly-Warringah Sea Eagles, 11 points all. He did not play in the grand final replay due to injury.

He finished his career with Eastern Suburbs in 1980.
