= John McMartin (rugby league) =

Australian rugby league footballer

Personal information
- Born: 3 March 1944
- Died: 13 February 2018 (aged 73)

Playing information
- Position: Hooker
Club
Years	Team	Pld	T	G	FG	P
1966–75	Parramatta Eels	167	13	0	0	39
1976–79	Cronulla Sharks	92	2	0	0	6
	Total	259	15	0	0	45
Representative
Years	Team	Pld	T	G	FG	P
1975	New South Wales	1	0	0	0	0
1975	NSW City	1	0	0	0	0

John McMartin (3 March 1944 – 13 February 2018) was an Australian rugby league player who played in the 1960s and 1970s.

== Playing career ==
McMartin was graded with the Parramatta club in the mid-1960s and was playing first grade by 1967. In his final year with the Eels in 1975, he represented New South Wales in one match.

In 1976, he was offered a $10000 contract to join the Cronulla-Sutherland Sharks and four seasons with them including the 1978 Grand Final.

McMartin was the identical twin brother of Mal McMartin, who also played in the NSWRFL for the Penrith Panthers, the Balmain Tigers and the Parramatta Eels.

McMartin retired at the end of the 1979 NSWRFL season.

== Death ==
McMartin died on 13 February 2018.
