= Eric Archer =

Australian rugby league footballer

Personal information
- Full name: Eric Archer
- Born: Armidale, New South Wales, Australia

Playing information
- Position: Centre, Second-row
Club
Years	Team	Pld	T	G	FG	P
1972–79	Cronulla-Sutherland	110	21	21	0	105
- Source: As of 11 April 2019

Eric Archer is an Australian former rugby league footballer who played in the 1970s. He played for Cronulla-Sutherland in the New South Wales Rugby League (NSWRL) competition.

== Background ==
Archer grew up in Armidale and represented NSW Country Seconds before moving to Sydney to sign with Cronulla.

== Playing career ==
Archer made his first grade debut for Cronulla in 1972. In 1973, Cronulla reached their first ever grand final against Manly-Warringah. Archer played at centre in the grand final which is often remembered as one of the most brutal grand finals due to the solid defense of both teams. Manly would go on to defeat Cronulla 10–7 in front of 52,044 at the Sydney Cricket Ground.

In the following seasons, Cronulla fell back down the ladder after the grand final defeat but Archer remained a regular starter in the team and switched positions from centre to second-row. In 1978, Cronulla finished 2nd on the table and qualified for the finals. Cronulla defeated Manly in the opening week of the finals series 17–12 with Archer scoring a try. Cronulla then defeated minor premiers Western Suburbs to reach their second grand final against Manly.

In the Grand Final, Archer played at second-row as Cronulla went to a 9–4 lead in the second half before Manly came back to hit the front 11–9. A Steve Rogers penalty squared it at 11-all but he then missed a desperate late field-goal attempt and at full-time the scores remained locked. Just 3 days later, Cronulla and Manly were required to contest a grand final replay to declare a winner. Both Manly and Cronulla went into the replay with tired players including Archer but it was Manly who prevailed in the replay 16-0 winning their fourth premiership.

Archer retired at the end of the 1979 season. His last game for Cronulla in the top grade was in Round 11 1979 against Penrith.
