= Wayne Springall =

Australian rugby league footballer

Personal information
- Full name: Wayne Springall
- Born: 23 September 1956 (age 70) Sydney, New South Wales, Australia

Playing information
- Position: Second-row, Lock
Club
Years	Team	Pld	T	G	FG	P
1977–81	Manly-Warringah	42	4	0	0	12
1982–83	Illawarra Steelers	37	2	0	0	6
	Total	79	6	0	0	18
- Source: As of 25 February 2019

Wayne Springall is an Australian former professional rugby league footballer who played in the 1970s and 1980s. Springall was a foundation player for Illawarra, playing in the club's first game.

== Playing career ==
Springall made his first grade debut for Manly-Warringah against Western Suburbs in Round 2 1977 at Lidcombe Oval.

In 1978, Springall played in the club's premiership victory over Cronulla-Sutherland. The original grand final finished in a draw with the sides required to return for a replay which finished 16–0 in Manly's favor.

Springall played with Manly up until the end of the 1981 season before signing with newly admitted club Illawarra in 1982. Springall played in the club's first ever game on 28 February 1982 against Penrith which ended in a 17–7 loss.

At the end of 1982, Springall was voted Illawarra's player of the season.

Springall retired at the end of the 1983 season.
