= Graham Eadie =

Australia international rugby league footballer

Personal information
- Born: 25 November 1953 (age 72) Lidcombe, New South Wales

Playing information
- Height: 179 cm (5 ft 10 in)
- Weight: 95 kg (14 st 13 lb)
- Position: Fullback
Club
Years	Team	Pld	T	G	FG	P
1971–83	Manly-Warringah	237	71	847	3	1917
1986–89	Halifax	72	29	22	0	160
	Total	309	100	869	3	2077
Representative
Years	Team	Pld	T	G	FG	P
1974–80	New South Wales	14	3	13	0	35
1974–79	Australia	20	2	5	0	16
1974–83	NSW City	6	9	11	0	49

Graham "Wombat" Eadie (born 25 November 1953), is an Australian former rugby league footballer who played in the 1970s and 1980s. He has been named amongst Australia's finest of the 20th century. A New South Wales State of Origin and Australian international representative fullback, he played in Australia during Manly-Warringah's dominance of the NSWRFL competition during the 1970s. He won four premierships with them and his 1,917 points in first grade and 2,070 points in all grades were both records at the time of his retirement. Eadie also played in England for Halifax, winning the Challenge Cup Final of 1987 with them. He also won World Cups with Australia and collected awards such as the Rothmans Medal and Lance Todd Trophy.

== Playing career ==
- Manly 1971–1983: 237 games, 1,917 points (71 tries, 847 goals, 3 field goals)
- Australia 1973–1979: 20 Tests, 16 points (2 tries, 5 goals)
- New South Wales 1974-1980: 14 games, 35 points (3 tries, 13 goals)

Eadie was graded by Manly-Warringah in 1971 and showed immediate promise in the lower grades that season. The following year with the retirement of long serving Manly fullback Bob Batty, he established himself as the team's first grade fullback and his powerful running style was already a serious danger to all Manly's opponents. Though not excessively tall at just under 180 cm (5 ft 11 in), Eadie's solid build of around 95 kg (15 stone) gave him abundant pace and so much strength that once he was on the move, few opposing defenders were ever able to stop him when he ran into the backline. At the same time, Eadie was an accurate line kicker and extremely safe under the high ball in an era when the "bomb" was coming into prominence.

Although he had been used as a goal kicker in some games in 1972, it was only in 1973 that Eadie became Manly's major point scorer. That year, he kicked 14 goals in a match against Penrith, and for the following three years he was the leading point scorer in the competition, reaching a high of 242 points (14 tries and 100 goals) in 1975, a club record that would not be broken until New Zealand dual international fullback Matthew Ridge scored 257 points (11 tries, 106 goals and 1 field goal) in 1995.

Eadie was selected to the Australian team for the 1973 Kangaroo tour and, after an injury to Kangaroos Captain-coach Graeme Langlands, took over as Test fullback for the final two Ashes tests against Great Britain, marking his début at Headingley in Leeds by kicking 5 goals in windy conditions. Though Langlands regained the test fullback spot in 1974, Eadie went on to be Australia's regular fullback from 1975 until he retired from representative rugby league following the experimental 1980 State of Origin match. Despite being a record point scorer for Manly, Eadie was never a prolific point scorer at Test or State representative level as Country Firsts and later Parramatta Centre Michael Cronin was generally the first choice kicker in representative sides.

In 1974, Eadie won the Rothmans Medal as Sydney rugby league's best-and-fairest player, and at the end of the controversial 1978 finals series he produced one of the finest performances ever by a fullback in the Grand Final replay, "where he single-handedly destroyed Cronulla-Sutherland by scoring a try, setting up two others for Russell Gartner and kicking three goals and a field goal". Two years earlier, his accurate goal kicking under pressure won Manly the 1976 Grand Final where they scored only one try to Parramatta's two. Eadie's dominance in the '76 and '78 Grand Finals was recognised thirty years later with the awarding of retrospective Clive Churchill Medals for Man of the Match in those games.

In 1977, Eadie was Australia's first choice fullback for the 1977 World Cup and played in Australia's 13–12 win over Great Britain in the World Cup final at the Sydney Cricket Ground.

Following the 1978 Grand Final, Eadie was selected to his second Kangaroo Tour. The coach of the 1978 Kangaroos was Eadie's Manly coach Frank Stanton, while the captain was his former long time Sea Eagles teammate Bob Fulton, who was at the time playing for Eastern Suburbs. Eadie played fullback in all 5 test matches on the tour with Australia defeating Great Britain 2–1 to win The Ashes, but surprisingly lost the test series to France 2–0. He also played in the non-test international against Wales at the St. Helen's Rugby Ground in Swansea with Australia winning 8–3.

Despite Manly declining in surprising fashion to miss the semi-finals for the first time in twelve years in 1979, Eadie's form remained excellent and he played in all 3 Ashes tests against a very lackluster touring Great Britain side. He then went on to play in the inaugural State of Origin game at fullback for New South Wales in 1980, though he would miss the mid-season tour to New Zealand with the Australian team that year.

A major injury that forced him to miss half of the 1981 season and saw him lose his test fullback spot failed to dim his brilliance: at the end of 1982, commentators were noticing how he was "more involved in the game than at any stage since 1973." On his retirement from Sydney rugby league after Manly's loss to Parramatta in the 1983 Grand Final fans were left with the feeling he may still have a lot to offer the game. With fellow Australian Chris Anderson as Coach, Eadie later made a comeback for English club Halifax, when he scored sixteen tries (a record for a fullback) and helped Halifax to the 1986 Club Championship. Eadie played fullback, scored a try, and was man of the match winning the Lance Todd Trophy in Halifax's 19–18 victory over St. Helens in the 1987 Challenge Cup Final during the 1986–87 season at Wembley Stadium, London on Saturday 2 May 1987, in front of 94,273 people.

In 1983 he overtook Eric Simms' record for the most points scored in an NSWRFL career (1,841); Eadie's total of 1,917 stood as the new career record until it was bettered by Mick Cronin in 1985.

== Coaching career ==
After retirement Eadie occasionally wrote articles for such magazines as Rugby League Week and attempted to carve a career as a coach. His first attempt with Halifax was short-lived, and in 1991 he returned to Australia as coach of the Gold Coast reserve grade side.

Eadie coached the Mullumbimby Giants in the Northern Rivers Regional Rugby League competition for the 2012 season.

== Accolades ==
In 1990, Eadie was selected at fullback when the club recognised its greatest ever players until that time. Later in 2006 he was again the first choice fullback when the club selected its "Dream Team".

In February 2008, Eadie was named at #25 in the list of Australia's 100 Greatest Players (1908–2007) which was commissioned by the NRL and ARL to celebrate the code's centenary year in Australia.

The Open Rugby inaugural World XIII was revealed in June 1978, it was; Graham Eadie, John Atkinson, Steve Rogers, Jean-Marc Bourret, Green Vigo, Roger Millward, Steve Nash, Jim Mills, Keith Elwell, Steve Pitchford, Terry Randall, George Nicholls and Greg Pierce.

== Family ==
His son, Brook Eadie, represented Queensland under-19 and won a President's Cup premiership with the South Queensland Crushers in 1996, but plans for a top grade career were thwarted by the demise of that club due to the Super League war. Eadie still lives on the Gold Coast today, where he works as a sales representative for a local brewery.

== Sources ==
- Whiticker, Alan and Hudson, Glen; The Encyclopedia of Rugby League Players (3rd edition); published 1998 by Gary Allen Pty. Ltd.; 9 Cooper Street, Smithfield, New South Wales, 2164.

Preceded by Eric Simms (1973)	Record-holder; Most points in an NSWRFL career 1983 (1,843) - 1985 (1,917)	Succeeded by Mick Cronin (1985)
