= Steve Kneen =

Australian rugby league footballer

Personal information
- Born: 4 June 1953 (age 73) Sutherland, New South Wales, Australia

Playing information
- Position: Second-row
Club
Years	Team	Pld	T	G	FG	P
1976–82	Cronulla-Sutherland	87	5	0	0	15

Steve Kneen (born in Sydney, New South Wales) is an Australian former professional rugby league footballer who played for the Cronulla-Sutherland Sharks in the New South Wales Rugby League premiership competition. He was also selected on the 1978 tour to Britain with the Australian side but did not play in a Test. He primarily played at second-row forward.

== Biography ==
=== Early career ===
Kneen started his junior career with Sutherland Loftus United in the CSDRFL before moving south to Wollongong to work in the mines. While playing in the Illawarra District competition with Helensburg, Kneen was spotted by the Sharks.

=== Playing career ===
In 1976 he was signed by the Cronulla-Sutherland Sharks. He made his first-grade debut against Manly-Warringah on 21 March 1976.

Kneen played in both the drawn grand final in 1978 and the subsequent replay the same year. He was selected to go on the 1978 Kangaroo tour with the Australian side and played in six tour matches.

In 1981, Kneen was suspended for fifteen weeks after being found guilty of a head-high tackle on a player and tackling a player not in possession of the ball. Kneen was sent from the field after tackling Western Suburbs Magpies hooker Alan Latham. In 1982, Kneen received a twelve-month suspension and he left Cronulla-Sutherland at the end of the season. The following year he captain-coached Bowral in the Country Rugby League. In 1984 he accepted a contract with the Illawarra Steelers but after ten games in reserve grade a bad hamstring injury ended his second professional stint and he retired from the game.

== Sources ==
- Whiticker, Alan & Hudson, Glen (2007). The Encyclopedia of Rugby League Players. Wetherill Park, New South Wales: Gary Allen Pty Ltd. p. 292. ISBN 978-1-877082-93-1.
