= Terry Randall =

Australia international rugby league footballer

Personal information
- Full name: Terry William Randall
- Born: 5 February 1951 (age 75) Sydney, New South Wales, Australia

Playing information
- Position: Second-row, Prop, Lock, Centre
Club
| Years | Team | Pld | T | G | FG | P |
|---|---|---|---|---|---|---|
| 1970–82 | Manly-Warringah | 160 | 21 | 0 | 1 | 65 |
Representative
| Years | Team | Pld | T | G | FG | P |
| 1973–78 | New South Wales | 13 | 0 | 0 | 0 | 0 |
| 1973–77 | Australia | 12 | 4 | 0 | 0 | 12 |
| 1976–78 | NSW City | 3 | 1 | 0 | 0 | 3 |
- Relatives: Chad Randall (son)

Terry William "Igor" Randall (born 5 February 1951 in Sydney, New South Wales) is an Australian former rugby league footballer who played for the Manly-Warringah club in the New South Wales Rugby Football League premiership. He is regularly named in all-time great teams and polls. He also represented New South Wales and Australia. He began his career in 1970 as a Centre, but soon after in 1972 was switched to the forwards by coach Ron Willey, primarily playing in the second-row. His nickname was Igor.

He is the father of Chad Randall who made his debut for Manly in 2003. Chad also played as a hooker for the London Broncos in the Super League competition.

== Club career ==
=== Manly-Warringah ===
He was regarded for his defence, in which is he is noted as one of, if not the, hardest tacklers in the history of the game. In a testament to his toughness and talent, Randall never started one of his 208 games for the Sea Eagles from the bench. Terry was rewarded for his toughness when named as one of the toughest 12 players in Rugby League.

A local Manly junior from the North Curl Curl club, initially he was a hard tackling centre when graded by the Sea Eagles before making his first grade debut in 1970 against St George at the Sydney Cricket Ground. Randall scored a try on debut, though the Sea Eagles lost 22–14. Randall played in the second-row in Manly's first ever NSWRFL premiership win in 1972. He backed that up by also playing in Manly's 1973, 1976 and 1978 premiership wins.

During the 1978 season, Terry Randall became the first player to receive a perfect 10 rating by Rugby League Week in Manly's 19–5 win over St George at Brookvale Oval. He was also instrumental in Manly's incredible 1978 finals series performance that included 2 draws in a total of 6 games played over 24 days to climax with victory in the Grand Final Replay. According to Manly and Australian coach Frank Stanton, during the finals series Randall was often only able to take his place on the side after receiving numerous pain killing injections. Randall was the player in the 1978 Grand Final that put up the "high, high Garryowen" that ultimately led to a try by Manly's Tom Mooney following multiple fumbles and trips by players and even referee, Greg Hartley. The try and Rex Mossop's inimitable commentary was the intro piece for Seven's Big League during 1979.

Terry Randall made an on-the-spot decision to retire from playing immediately following Manly's 8–21 loss to defending premiers, the Parramatta Eels in the 1982 Grand Final, telling his teammates as they left the field that he had simply "had enough" (the decision was so sudden, he had not even discussed it with his wife beforehand). Randall hung his boots on a hook in the SCG dressing rooms and never played again.

Long remembered by adoring Sea Eagles fans, signs appeared in the crowd at Brookvale Oval during Manly's 1987 premiership year telling second rower Ron Gibbs to "Give back Randall's jumper" after it was revealed that "Rambo" Gibbs (himself a hard tackler like Igor) would leave Manly at the end of the year to play for the Gold Coast Giants for their inaugural year in 1988. Though Gibbs did win back the fans with a number of impressive performances which culminated in their 18–8 Grand Final win over the Canberra Raiders.

== Representative career ==
=== City ===
Terry Randall first played for NSW City in 1976, scoring a try in City's 46–0 thrashing of NSW Country at the SCG. He went on to represent City again in both 1977 and 1978.

=== New South Wales ===
Randall made his debut for New South Wales from the bench in a rare 10–11 loss to Queensland at the Sydney Sports Ground in 1972. He would go on to represent The Blues 13 times during his career, playing his last interstate game in NSW's 12–11 win over Qld at Lang Park in 1978.

=== Australia ===
Randall was selected for the Australian team on the 1973 Kangaroo tour, but a broken thumb suffered on tour restricted him to only five minor games and he did not play in a test. He first represented Australia during the 1975 World Cup, playing in the front row in Australia's 36–8 win over New Zealand at Lang Park, scoring a try on debut. He went on to play in 11 internationals for Australia during his career, the last coming in Australia's 13–12 win over Great Britain at the SCG during the 1977 World Cup.

Randall was selected for the 1978 Kangaroo tour, but pulled out of the squad citing injury and exhaustion after Manly's arduous finals campaign in 1978 where the Sea Eagles played 6 matches in 24 days, including the drawn Grand Final against Cronulla-Sutherland and the replay played just three days later. "I was having troubles all year with my noggin," he said. He later regretted his decision not to tour with the victorious 1978 Kangaroos.

All of Randall's international games for the Australian side came during the 1975 and 1977 Rugby League World Cups.

=== Open Rugby inaugural World XIII ===
He went on to play the Open Rugby inaugural World XIII with; Graham Eadie, John Atkinson, Steve Rogers, Jean-Marc Bourret, Green Vigo, Roger Millward, Steve Nash, Jim Mills, Keith Elwell, Steve Pitchford, George Nicholls and Greg Pierce.

== Administration ==
Following his retirement, Randall moved into the administrative side of rugby league and became a long time board member of the Manly-Warringah Sea Eagles. He also went into business for himself as a landscaper and excavator.
