= Kevin Stevens (rugby league) =

Australian rugby league footballer

Personal information
- Born: 17 May 1953 (age 72) Grafton, New South Wales, Australia

Playing information
- Position: Five-eighth, Second-row, Lock
Club
Years	Team	Pld	T	G	FG	P
1974–80	Eastern Suburbs	60	26	124	0	326
1981	Parramatta	19	1	0	0	3
	Total	79	27	124	0	329

Kevin Stevens (born 17 May 1953) is an Australian former rugby league footballer who played in the 1970s and 1980s. Stevens was a utility player who filled a number of positions across the field, such as five-eighth, second-row or lock.

== Playing career ==
Stevens made his first grade debut for Easts in 1974, and was a member of the 1975 premiership-winning side, where Easts thrashed St George 38–0. That same year, he competed at lock in the mid-week four-quarter Amco Cup final, winning 17-7 over the Parramatta Eels. A versatile player & quite accurate with goal kicking duties generally, his career later was threatened by a series of knee injuries, forcing him to play as a prop in reserve grade in 1980 when Jack Gibson's decision to bring him to Parramatta drew much criticism. After missing the semi-finals with an elbow injury, Stevens was a valuable member of Parramatta's maiden grand final victory over Newtown in 1981.
