= Simon Booth (rugby league, born 1956) =

Australian rugby league footballer

Personal information
- Full name: Simon Connelly Booth
- Born: 5 October 1956 (age 68)

Playing information
- Position: Centre, Wing
Club
Years	Team	Pld	T	G	FG	P
1977–82	Manly Warringah	115	30	0	0	90
1983–84	Balmain Tigers	25	5	0	0	20
	Total	140	35	0	0	110

Simon Connelly Booth (born 5 October 1956) is an Australian former professional rugby league footballer who played for Manly Warringah and Balmain in the NSWRL competition.

Recruited from Lakes United in Newcastle, Booth was a centre and winger during his career.

Booth featured in Manly's 1978 premiership team, playing on the wing in both the grand final draw and replay win over Cronulla.

In 1983 and 1984 he played for Balmain, under his former Manly coach Frank Stanton.
