= 1980 State of Origin game =

Australian rugby league series

The 1980 State of Origin game was the first game between the Queensland Maroons and the New South Wales Blues rugby league teams to be played under "state of origin" selection rules. It was the third match of 1980's annual interstate series between the Blues and the Maroons, and was only allowed to go ahead because the first two matches (and the title) were already won by New South Wales under established 'state of residency' rules. It was played on 8 July 1980 under the newly configured rules by which a player would represent his "state of origin", i.e. the state in which he was born or in which he started playing registered first grade rugby league football.

The first two matches had been played under the existing residential selection rules - i.e. Blues players could only be sourced from clubs south of the border and the Maroons only from north of it before the single experimental match took place. This was often a source of angst for Queensland as the old state-of-residence rules had long seen some of Queensland's top players actually representing New South Wales as players could earn better money in the Sydney premiership thanks to clubs cashed up with poker machine money. As poker machines were illegal in Queensland, most of the clubs couldn't hope to match the money on offer to their star players, with a steady stream of players leaving to play for Sydney clubs. The list of players who had headed south in the 1960s and 1970s had included Arthur Beetson, John Lang, Rod Reddy, Rod Morris, Mitch Brennan and Kerry Boustead.

After a match involving intense all-in brawling, the Maroons won the first State of Origin game 20–10.

== Background ==
The first match of the annual best-of-three interstate series was played at Lang Park in Brisbane and won by NSW 35–3. In the second game at Leichhardt Oval in Sydney (described by Qld Halfback Wally Lewis as being played on a Tuesday night in front of two men and their dog, with the dog going home at half-time. The official paid attendance was just 1,368 compared to the 25,000 crowd for Game 1 in Brisbane), the Maroons put up more of a fight against a NSW side that was missing a number of players through injury, but were defeated again, this time 17–7. The first State of Origin game very nearly didn't go ahead in 1980. The Queenslanders had put in a spirited and much improved performance in the second game at Leichhardt Oval, with officials confirming that had they actually won the game then the third game of the series would have been played under the State of Residency rules and Origin as it has become might have died then and there. Queenslanders Kerry Boustead, Rod Reddy, Rod Morris, John Lang and Graham Quinn had actually played for NSW in the first two games of the 1980 Interstate series, with all bar Quinn being selected to represent Queensland in the Origin game.

Prior to the experimental match, the State of Origin concept was derided by the Sydney Media. The Daily Mirror's Ron Casey showed his opposition to the game, and his bias towards Sydney as a whole when he called it a 'Phoney Promotion' and wrote in his newspaper column: "To the Queensland hillbillies in Premier Joh's Bananaland, the State of Origin match might be a big deal, but to those in the land of the living, here in Sydney, its just another match without much meaning". One member of the Sydney media who welcomed the game was Ray "Rabbits" Warren, who wrote in the Sunday Telegraph: "I know a lot of people are upset at the go-ahead of the State of Origin game, but I congratulate those who pushed it through. Queensland and NSW Country areas need an injection of life and this match can do nothing but good for the game north of the border."

Former Australian test captain and at the time coach of Eastern Suburbs Bob Fulton, who would later go on to be a successful Australian coach and ironically become a long-term NSW Origin selector, was also against the concept. He wrote in The Daily Mirror that "Rugby league's non-event of the century will be staged in Brisbane next month, a totally useless State of Origin clash between NSW and Queensland. Only the AU$30,000 gate could make it acceptable to administrators ... No Sydney club could possibly want the match but no doubt it will go ahead. As far as I'm concerned it's strictly a non-event and will achieve absolutely nothing".

Prior to the game getting the go ahead, the President of the NSWRL Kevin Humphreys, had called a meeting with league delegates from the 12 Sydney based clubs and allowed all to put forward their views on having the Origin style match. In the end, a vote was held with the vote 9–3 in favour of it going ahead (and proving Fulton wrong in the process). Only South Sydney, Eastern Suburbs and St. George opposed the game. Following the meeting, Humphreys rang his QRL counterpart, Senator Ron McAuliffe, with the good news.

Queensland players such as captain-coach Arthur Beetson and Kangaroos back rower Rod Reddy were enthused to be able to represent their home state while some, such as Australian winger Kerry Boustead, believed that players should represent the state in which they lived (at the time Boustead was playing for Sydney club Eastern Suburbs). However, the test winger offered no objections to his selection for the Maroons and went on to become the first Queensland player to score a try in Origin football.

== Match summary ==
The NSWRL demanded a neutral referee for the game. As a consequence, respected British referee Billy Thompson was flown from England to control the game. Queensland went into the game not having won a match since 1975. Before the game, QRL President McAuliffe entered the Maroons dressing room to make a personal plea to the players. He said: "The future of the game is in your hands. We have taken this bold step. If we are beaten we cannot retreat to any other position. We must win".

Tuesday, 8 July 1980	Queensland	20-10	New South Wales	Lang Park, Brisbane
8:00pm	Tries: Boustead; Close; Goals: Meninga 7/7	[Report Report]	Tries: Brentnall; Raudonikis; Goals: Cronin 2/3	Attendance: 33,210; Referee: Billy Thompson; Player of the Match: Chris Close

In front of a capacity Lang Park crowd of 33,210, which included State of Origin's instigator, Senator Ron McAuliffe, Federal Defence Minister Jim Killen, and journalist Hugh Lunn, the Maroons were led out by former Kangaroos skipper, 35-year-old Arthur Beetson who was playing for Queensland for the first time. Beetson, after starring for Redcliffe in Brisbane in 1964 and 1965, had been told by the QRL that if he stayed in Brisbane he would be in line for state selection in 1966. However, he received an offer he couldn't refuse from Sydney club Balmain and ended up playing 18 games for NSW between 1966 and 1977 under the old state of residency rule. Beetson was actually playing Reserve Grade for the Parramatta Eels in Sydney at the time that Ron McAulliffe approached him and offered him the chance to finally play for his home state.

The first points scored in Origin football was a penalty goal by heavyweight Queensland centre Mal Meninga - the first of seven goals from seven attempts he would kick in the match (on his 20th birthday no less), while New South Wales' winger Greg Brentnall had the honour of scoring the first try in State of Origin football following good lead up work by Kangaroos pair Graham Eadie and Mick Cronin. After an all-in brawl in the first half and leading 9–5 at the break, Queensland took over the game and with Mal Meninga kicking 7/7 goals defeated NSW 20–10, the first time the Maroons had won a state game over NSW since 1975. Queensland centre Chris Close was the standout player from both sides, scoring a try in the second half and was a clear choice as Man of the Match. From a standing start, Close received the ball only 25m out from Meninga. He then simply accelerated through a big hole in the NSW defence and evaded fullback Graham Eadie to put the ball down next to the goal posts without a NSW player touching him.

Alan Clarkson, a journalist for The Sydney Morning Herald wrote of the State of Origin experiment, "I was strongly against such a match, but last night's gripping clash showed that such a fixture would be a welcome addition to the League program."

Although they had already represented Queensland in under the old residency rules, the win by the Maroons brought Queensland's new generation players such as heavyweight centres Chris Close and Mal Meninga, as well as lock forward Wally Lewis into the spotlight. The trio, along with other Queensland-based players such as Colin Scott, Gene Miles, Brad Backer, Mark Murray, Bryan Niebling, Wally Fullerton-Smith and Greg Conescu would dominate Origin football over the next 4 years.

== Teams ==
Of the twenty-six players taking the field in the first State of Origin match, twenty were selected from the New South Wales Rugby Football League clubs while six were from Queensland Rugby League clubs.

=== New South Wales ===
Position	Player	Club
Fullback	Graham Eadie	Manly-Warringah Sea Eagles
Wing	Chris Anderson	Canterbury-Bankstown Bulldogs
Centre	Mick Cronin	Parramatta Eels
Centre	Steve Rogers	Cronulla-Sutherland Sharks
Wing	Greg Brentnall	Canterbury-Bankstown Bulldogs
Five-eighth	Alan Thompson	Manly-Warringah Sea Eagles
Halfback	Tommy Raudonikis (c)	Newtown Jets
Prop	Gary Hambly	South Sydney Rabbitohs
Hooker	Steve Edge	Parramatta Eels
Prop	Craig Young	St. George Dragons
Second Row	Bob Cooper	Western Suburbs Magpies
Second Row	Graeme Wynn	St. George Dragons
Lock	Jim Leis	Western Suburbs Magpies
Reserve	Robert Stone	St. George Dragons
Reserve	Steve Martin	Manly-Warringah Sea Eagles
Coach	Ted Glossop	Canterbury-Bankstown Bulldogs

=== Queensland ===
With Queenslanders playing for New South Welsh clubs now available for selection, seven of the Maroons' starting thirteen were selected from Sydney clubs.

Position	Player	Club
Fullback	Colin Scott	Eastern Suburbs Tigers
Wing	Kerry Boustead	Eastern Suburbs Roosters
Centre	Mal Meninga	Southern Suburbs Magpies
Centre	Chris Close	Redcliffe Dolphins
Wing	Brad Backer	Eastern Suburbs Tigers
Five-eighth	Alan Smith	North Sydney Bears
Halfback	Greg Oliphant	Balmain Tigers
Prop	Rod Morris	Balmain Tigers
Hooker	John Lang	Eastern Suburbs Roosters
Prop	Arthur Beetson (c)	Parramatta Eels
Second Row	Rohan Hancock	Toowoomba Clydesdales
Second Row	Rod Reddy	St. George Dragons
Lock	Wally Lewis	Fortitude Valley Diehards
Reserve	Norm Carr^{*}	Western Suburbs Panthers
Reserve	Bruce Astill^{*}	Southern Suburbs Magpies
Coach	John McDonald	

^{*} Did not play

== See also ==
- 1980 NSWRFL season
