= 1981 State of Origin game =

Australian rugby league series

The 1981 State of Origin game was the second such match between arch rivals Queensland and New South Wales to be played under State of Origin selection rules. Again it was played as the third game of an already-decided 3-game series. New South Wales' victories in the first two games under the "state of residency" selection rules were, however, the last matches of this kind to ever be played as the following year the Origin concept was fully embraced.

The match featured a stunning comeback by the Maroons, an all-in-brawl, a 95-metre try by Eric Grothe, Sr. and the second consecutive man-of-the-match performance from Queensland centre, Chris Close.

== Background ==
Despite the success of the 1980 State of Origin game, there was still opposition to the game going ahead from certain parts of the Sydney media. One who had opposed the game the year before, The Daily Mirror's Ron Casey, was still against the concept and wrote "It's a mark of the lack of sophistication of Brisbane football fans that they will accept as serious football the State of Origin match on Tuesday week. Its just an excuse for 30,000 fans to see top footballers thrown together for a Lang Park Roman Holiday. The game will prove nothing except that Brisbane is the only place in the world that would take it seriously."

Though it seemed that it wasn't just the media who opposed the game. In a column in the Sunday Telegraph, NSW and Australian centre Steve Rogers wrote: "And while we are on the State of Origin match, I hope it is canned this year. The players have enough representative football this season with the tour by France. The players don't relish the thought of the match and to put it on after a side has toured here is a bit hard". For Rogers, the NSW captain, the Origin game (played on July 28) would be his 7th game in 24 days having played in the two tests against France as well as four games for his club team Cronulla-Sutherland since July 4.

== Match report ==
With rugby league officials from NSW still not convinced of the State of Origin format, the 1980 model was repeated in 1981 when the first two matches were played under the old residential selection criteria. With the confidence gained from the 1980 Origin win, the Queensland residents were more competitive than they had been in years, losing 10–2 at Lang Park and 22–9 at Leichhardt Oval, with New South Wales taking the series before the third match reverted to the new Origin selection criteria and the intensity again picked up.

Queensland chose to call on only four Sydney-based players for the game - winger Mitch Brennan from South Sydney, second-rower Paul McCabe from Easts and front-rowers Rod Morris (Balmain) and Paul Khan (Cronulla). Maroons captain-coach Arthur Beetson, who was seeing out his playing days at age 36 with Redcliffe, had been in fine form for the two residential clashes, but pulled out with an eye injury on the day of the match, giving the Queensland captaincy to 21-year-old five-eighth Wally Lewis. Beetson later admitted that he faked the injury and told the real reason he pulled out of the game was that he had lost the motivation to keep playing representative football after being overlooked for the test series against France. Beetson was reportedly in line for his first test since the 1977 World Cup, but NSWRL and ARL boss Kevin Humphreys voted against Beetson's selection with a view to the future and the Kangaroo Tour to be held at the end of 1982. Humphreys felt that at 36 Beetson had nothing left to offer the test side.

NSW had originally selected South Sydney's Michael Pattison to play Five-eighth, but had fallen ill before the team left Sydney and the flight at altitude had caused a middle-ear infection that forced him to withdraw. Pattison spent the game on the sidelines compiling stats for Channel 7 (Sydney) sideline reporter Barry Ross. Selectors then chose young Western Suburbs player Terry Lamb as his replacement and rushed him to Brisbane on the afternoon of the game (the NSWRL literally found the then Telecom employee "up a pole" doing his day job). This was against the wishes of coach Ted Glossop who wanted to move Steve Rogers to the halves, Phil Sigsworth to the centres, bring in Garry Dowling as fullback and play Lamb from the bench. The team actually trained in those positions on the morning of the game before Lamb arrived and according to Glossop, Rogers trained very well at pivot and combined well with Qld born Peter Sterling who was making his Origin debut for the Blues. Glossop later recounted that he was told of Lamb's selection immediately after training and even then thought of going his own way until told the NSWRL insisted that Lamb play 5/8 and Rogers was not play anywhere but in the centres.

Parramatta Eels halfback Sterling, who had represented City Seconds earlier in the season, was a surprise choice over incumbent test halfback Steve Mortimer who had made his test debut a few weeks earlier against France. Mortimer reportedly paid the price for the Australia's less than convincing 17–2 second test win against the weak French at Lang Park despite having led Australia to a comprehensive 43–2 win in the first test at the Sydney Cricket Ground where he scored two tries on debut. The Canterbury-Bankstown halfback, who had played in the two State of Residence games that had preceded both the French tests and the Origin game, described his demotion as "A nice kick in the guts."

| Tuesday, 28th July 1981 | Queensland | 22-15 | New South Wales | Lang Park, Brisbane |
| 8:00 PM | Tries: Backer; Close; Lewis; Meninga (pen); Goals: Meninga 5/7; Sin bin: Morris | Report | Tries: Grothe (2); Cronin; Goals: Cronin 3/3; Sin bin: Bowden | Attendance: 25,613; Referee: Kevin Steel; Player of the Match: Chris Close |

Opposing props Rod Morris and Newtown's Steve Bowden clashed in an early tackle, following an errant elbow from Bowden, and punches were thrown. In the ensuing melee, Lewis sought out Terry Lamb and gave him a rugged welcome to interstate football with a number of uppercuts. After 7 minutes of play, the next scrum erupted into a brawl with Bowden and Morris singled out by referee Kevin Steele as the chief instigators, with both then sent to the sin-bin for 10 minutes (though replays indicated that Morris had done most of the punching with Bowden unusually restrained) with NSW receiving a penalty. In that period the Blues raced to a 15–0 lead thanks to their Parramatta connection of Peter Sterling, Ray Price, Eric Grothe and Mick Cronin, with Price and Sterling setting up one try for Grothe and another for Cronin (all four players would later that year feature in the Eels' inaugural premiership victory). This was the second of Grothe's tries for the game, the first came after 13 minutes when he swooped upon a wayward pass by Maroons' hooker Greg Conescu and raced 95-metres down the touchline, easily out pacing his opposite number Mitch Brennan and Qld halfback Ross Henrick before busting through the cover defending tackles of Brad Backer (coming from the opposite wing) and Colin Scott to score in the corner to give the Blues a 5–0 lead after Cronin's sideline conversion. Backer's tackle had actually caused Grothe to fall and he looked to have stopped less than half a metre short, but Scott's subsequent effort hitting the Blues winger as he hit the ground actually dragged him over the line for the try. Soon after Price sent Sterling through a big gap in the defence and he found Cronin backing up on his outside to score. After Cronin converted his own try, NSW led 10–0 after just 16 minutes. Grothe scored his second try moments later after Henrick was penalised for not retiring behind a scrum. A simple run-around move saw Sterling pass to Price who sent his winger bursting through a weak Chris Phelan tackle to score under the posts.

With the score 15–0 after less than 20 minutes it looked like the days of old with NSW dominating. However, Queensland's defence stiffened, and they took back some momentum just before half-time when winger Backer grabbed a try in the corner off a long pass from McCabe to make it 15–5. NSW had been running the ball our from their own line but lost possession when second rower Les Boyd, thinking he was a decoy runner and not paying attention, didn't realise the ball was being thrown to him. The ball bounced forward off his hip and was regathered by Queensland who scored through Backer just 3 tackles later.

Following the break, new Queensland captain Wally Lewis sparked a second-half Maroons revival when he stepped past Sterling and went on a long, diagonal run, breaking a late attempt at tackle by Ray Price to score a dazzling (and much-replayed) individual try. Barry Ross told television viewers that Lewis had told him earlier in the day that he was motivated to play well after receiving criticism from the Sydney media for both his selection in the Australian team and his supposedly lacklustre form in the tests against France. The media had wanted City and NSW state of residence games five-eighth Robert Laurie in the test team instead of Lewis who they felt was only selected to give the Queensland Rugby League a player in the team. There were 5 Queenslanders in the first test team, but Lewis was the only one not playing in the Sydney premiership.

Minutes after the restart came an enduring moment that has become part of Origin folklore. Queensland fullback Colin Scott received a pass from Lewis off the scrum near halfway and split the defence, bursting past NSW captain Steve Rogers in a 55-metre charge that ended just short of the line thanks to a despairing tackle by Grothe (who had started almost 10 metres behind Scott when he started the chase, showcasing his speed as Scott was no slouch). Grothe clung to Scott's ankles as he waited for his teammates to get back in defence, but in a now-famous image, Maroons centre Chris Close grabbed Grothe's hair before backhanding him out of the way. Close then picked up the ball from dummy-half and dived through Steve Rogers tackle to score next to the posts. Other NSW players would later claim they hung back from tackling Close as they expected to receive a penalty for the back hander and were surprised when it never came (there were claims that Grothe had injured himself when he tackled Scott, though Close disputes this saying he first yelled at Grothe to let go before back handing him when he didn't move). Mal Meninga converted to take the score to 15-all.

The momentum was now fully with Queensland and with 5 minutes remaining frustrated Blues lock Ray Price appeared to head-butt Queensland lock Chris Phelan in the play the ball, 20 metres out right in front of the posts. He was penalised and Meninga's kick put the Maroons in front for the first time in the game. In the final moments of the game with Qld again attacking the NSW line as they had done for most of the second half, Meninga grubber kicked the ball into the NSW in-goal and gave chase, but he was tackled without the ball by Steve Rogers before he could get to it causing referee Steele to award Qld a penalty try. Meninga converted from in front to complete Queensland's victory, setting a standard of expectation for miraculous Queensland comebacks that has been met time and time again in subsequent contests.

== Teams ==
=== New South Wales Team ===
| Position | Player |
|---|---|
| Fullback | Phil Sigsworth |
| Wing | Terry Fahey |
| Centre | Mick Cronin |
| Centre | Steve Rogers (c) |
| Wing | Eric Grothe, Sr. |
| Five-Eighth | Terry Lamb |
| Halfback | Peter Sterling |
| Prop | Steve Bowden |
| Hooker | Barry Jensen |
| Prop | Ron Hilditch |
| Second Row | Peter Tunks |
| Second Row | Les Boyd |
| Lock | Ray Price |
| Replacement | Garry Dowling |
| Replacement | Graeme O'Grady |
| Coach | Ted Glossop |

=== Queensland Team ===
Of Queensland's fifteen players used, four were selected from New South Wales clubs.

| Position | Player |
|---|---|
| Fullback | Colin Scott |
| Wing | Brad Backer |
| Centre | Mal Meninga |
| Centre | Chris Close |
| Wing | Mitch Brennan |
| Five-Eighth | Wally Lewis (c) |
| Halfback | Ross Henrick |
| Prop | Paul Khan |
| Hooker | Greg Conescu |
| Prop | Rod Morris |
| Second Row | Rohan Hancock |
| Second Row | Paul McCabe |
| Lock | Chris Phelan |
| Replacement | Norm Carr |
| Replacement | Mark Murray |
| Coach | Arthur Beetson |
