= Steve Blyth =

Australian rugby league player (1954–2024)

Personal information
- Full name: Stephen Donald Blyth
- Born: 15 July 1954 Sydney, New South Wales, Australia
- Died: 29 May 2024 (aged 69) Gosford, New South Wales, Australia

Playing information
- Position: Second-row, prop
Club
Years	Team	Pld	T	G	FG	P
1976–78	Western Suburbs	47	5	0	0	15
1979–82	Newtown Jets	42	3	0	0	9
	Total	89	8	0	0	24
- Source: As of 4 June 2019

Stephen Donald Blyth (15 July 1954 – 29 May 2024) was an Australian rugby league footballer who played in the 1970s and 1980s. He played for the Newtown Jets and the Western Suburbs Magpies in the New South Wales Rugby League (NSWRL) competition.

== Biography ==
Blyth made his first grade debut for Western Suburbs in 1976. In just his second season in 1977, Blyth would enjoy success with the Magpies winning the mid-week Amco Cup final six points to five, over Eastern Suburbs. Premiership success would elude them though, with just four wins from 11 games.

In 1978, Western Suburbs appointed Roy Masters as their new head coach. Masters turned Western Suburbs from a team that had been in decline since the 1960s into a competitive team which could compete for the premiership. Blyth made 14 appearances for Wests as they claimed the minor premiership in 1978 but fell short of a grand final appearance losing to Cronulla-Sutherland and Manly-Warringah in the semi-finals. Blyth didn't feature in the first grade team late in the season, missing the two semi-finals.

In 1979, Blyth left Wests for Newtown, having been recruited by renowned businessman John Singleton. Newtown would go onto finish second last avoiding their fourth consecutive wooden spoon under the coaching of Warren Ryan. In 1980 the Jets would improve markedly. Blyth was joined by fellow former Magpies Tom Raudonikis and Graeme O'Grady, the team narrowly finishing outside of the top five.

Blyth would enjoy a career best season in 1981, forming an intimidating combination with fellow prop-forward Steve Bowden. He would play 23 games throughout the season, reaching the NSWRL semi-finals. Newtown lost the Major Preliminary Semi-Final to Parramatta, before defeating Manly-Warringah and Eastern Suburbs on their way to the Grand Final facing the Parramatta Eels once again.

With Bowden suspended for the Grand Final, Blyth would face the formidable front row Eels pairing of Bob O'Reilly and Ron Hilditch. Newtown trailed Parramatta 7–6 at halftime, but took the lead 11-7 shortly after half-time. Parramatta stormed home in the second half to win 20-11 and claim their first premiership at the Sydney Cricket Ground.

Blyth played on with Newtown in 1982 but they were unable to replicate their form from the previous season and missed out on the finals, with Blyth featuring in just nine games. Blyth retired at the end of the 1982 season.

Blyth died from complications of dementia at Gosford Hospital, in May 2024, at the age of 69.
