= Graham Olling =

Australia international rugby league footballer

Personal information
- Full name: Graham Lindsay Olling
- Born: 19 July 1948 (age 77)

Playing information
- Position: Prop
Club
Years	Team	Pld	T	G	FG	P
1972–74	Easts (Sydney)	14	3	0	0	9
1975–80	Parramatta Eels	88	11	0	0	33
1981	Temora
	Total	102	14	0	0	42
Representative
Years	Team	Pld	T	G	FG	P
1977–78	New South Wales	3	1	0	0	3
1978	Australia	6	0	0	0	0
1981	Country NSW	1	0	0	0	0

Coaching information
Club
Years	Team	Gms	W	D	L	W%
1988–89	Redcliffe Dolphins

Graham Olling is an Australian former professional rugby league footballer who played in the 1970s and 1980s. An Australia international and New South Wales interstate representative forward, he played his club football mainly in Sydney's NSWRFL Premiership for Parramatta and Eastern Suburbs.

== Playing career ==
A Parramatta junior, Olling won a Second Division premiership with Wentworthville in 1971 before entering the NSWRFL Premiership with the Eastern Suburbs club the following year. There he played for three seasons before moving back to Parramatta. At the end of the 1976 NSWRFL season he was part of a forward pack which included Ray Higgs, Geoff Gerard, Ron Hilditch, Denis Fitzgerald and Ray Price, which lost the Eels' maiden grand final 13–10 to Manly-Warringah. The following year he played in the drawn grand final with St. George and its replay.

In 1977 Olling made headlines when he became the first rugby league player to admit to taking anabolic steroids. It was a six-week course taken under medical supervision in the off-season and was not illegal at the time. During 1978 he was selected to play for New South Wales against Queensland and then became Kangaroo No. 506 when he made his international début against the visiting New Zealand side. At the end of that season Olling was selected to go on the 1978 Kangaroo tour of Great Britain and France, playing in Test matches against both nations. A broken leg reduced the amount of football Olling played in 1980 and he left Sydney.

== Coaching career ==
Olling captain-coached Temora in 1981. He later moved to Brisbane and replaced Darryl van der Velde as coach the Redcliffe Dolphins, spending the 1988 and 1989 seasons in the role. He was then replaced by Mark Murray.
