= 1978 Kangaroo tour of Great Britain and France =

1978 rugby league tour

1978 Kangaroos tour
- Date: 30 October 1978 – 10 December 1978
- Manager: Peter Moore, Jim Caldwell
- Coach(es): Frank Stanton
- Tour captain(s): Bob Fulton
- Top point scorer(s): Michael Cronin (142)
- Top try scorer(s): Bob Fulton (9)
Summary
P	W	D	L
Total
22	18	0	4
Test match
5	2	0	3
Opponent
P	W	D	L
Great Britain
3	2	0	1
France
2	0	0	2

Tour chronology
- Previous tour: 1973
- Next tour: 1982

The 1978 Kangaroo tour of Great Britain and France comprised the Australia national rugby league team's fourteenth tour of Great Britain and ninth tour of France and took place from September to December 1978. Coached by Frank Stanton and captained by Bob Fulton, the Australian team, also known as the Kangaroos, played a match against Wales before contesting the Ashes series against Great Britain, winning the third and deciding Test match. The tourists then moved on to France where they were narrowly beaten in both Tests, the last series the Kangaroos would lose until 2005. In addition to these six internationals, the Australians played sixteen other matches against local club and representative sides in both countries. The 1978 Kangaroo tour followed the tour of 1973 while the next tour would be staged in 1982.

== Background ==
The 1978 Kangaroo tour was the first since 1973 and took place in the wake of Australia's rugby league season. Sydney's 1978 NSWRFL season, which contributed the vast majority of the tourists, ended later in the year than usual as it involved a grand final replay. For the English the tour was conducted during the first half of the 1978–79 Northern Rugby Football League season.

== Touring squad ==
The Australian team's coach was Frank Stanton, who had already taken the City, New South Wales and the Manly-Warringah teams to victory in all of their respective competitions that year. Eastern Suburbs's captain (and former Manly premiership captain under Stanton in 1976), Bob Fulton, was selected to be the touring Australian side's skipper while Cronulla back rower Greg Pierce was named as vice-captain. Manly-Warringah Grand Final winner John Harvey created some controversy when he declined selection for the tour for personal reasons. As a result, his Manly-Warringah teammate Bruce Walker was called in as a replacement. Another Manly premiership winner Terry Randall also declined to tour citing exhaustion after Manly's arduous finals campaign in 1978 where the Sea Eagles played 6 matched in 24 days, including the drawn Grand Final against Cronulla-Sutherland, and the replay played just three days later. He later admitted regret in not touring. One shock omission was Manly centre Russel Gartner, who had played two games for Australia in the 1977 World Cup including the Final in which he scored a spectacular 65 metre solo try. Gartner, a speedy outside back who could play either centre or wing, had scored two tries in the Grand Final replay, one a 70-metre effort where he easily outpaced the Cronulla defence despite having torn his hamstring a week earlier, was considered unlucky not to tour.

Of the 28 man squad, only three Queensland based players were chosen - Souths Innisfail winger Kerry Boustead, Brisbane Easts prop forward Rod Morris and Redcliffe halfback Greg Oliphant. The only other Queenslanders in the squad were St George back rower Rod Reddy and Manly forward Bruce Walker.

The tour manager was Canterbury-Bankstown Chief Executive Peter "Bullfrog" Moore, with Jim Caldwell as the co-manager.

Craig Young was named 'player of the tour'. Bob Fulton was the tourists' top try scorer with 9. Michael Cronin was the tourists' top point scorer with 142.

Player	Club	Position(s)	Tests	Matches	Tries	Goals	F/Goals	Points
(New South Wales) Chris Anderson	Canterbury-Bankstown Bulldogs	Wing	5					
(Queensland) Kerry Boustead	Innisfail Souths (Qld)	Wing	5					
(New South Wales) Les Boyd	Western Suburbs Magpies	Second-row, Prop	3					
(New South Wales) Larry Corowa	Balmain Tigers	Wing	0					
(New South Wales) Michael Cronin	Parramatta Eels	Centre	5					142
(New South Wales) Graham Eadie	Manly-Warringah Sea Eagles	Fullback	5					
(New South Wales) Bob Fulton (c)	Eastern Suburbs Roosters	Five-eighth, Centre	5		9			
(New South Wales) Geoff Gerard	Parramatta Eels	Prop, Second-row	5					
(New South Wales) Johnny Gibbs	Manly-Warringah Sea Eagles	Halfback	0					
(New South Wales) Ron Hilditch	Parramatta Eels	Hooker, Prop	1					
(New South Wales) Steve Kneen	Cronulla-Sutherland Sharks	Second-row, Lock	0					
(New South Wales) Max Krilich	Manly-Warringah Sea Eagles	Hooker	2					
(New South Wales) Steve Martin	Manly-Warringah Sea Eagles	Halfback	1					
(New South Wales) Allan McMahon	Balmain Tigers	Fullback, Wing, Centre	0					
(Queensland) Rod Morris	Eastern Suburbs Tigers (Qld)	Prop	2					
(Queensland) Greg Oliphant	Redcliffe Dolphins (Qld)	Halfback	0					
(Queensland) Graham Olling	Parramatta Eels	Prop	3					
(New South Wales) George Peponis	Canterbury-Bankstown Bulldogs	Hooker	2					
(New South Wales) Greg Pierce (vc)	Cronulla-Sutherland Sharks	Lock, Second-row	0					
(New South Wales) Ray Price	Parramatta Eels	Lock	5					
(New South Wales) Tommy Raudonikis	Western Suburbs Magpies	Halfback	5					
(Queensland) Rod Reddy	St George Dragons	Second-row, Lock	3					
(New South Wales) Steve Rogers	Cronulla-Sutherland Sharks	Centre	4					
(New South Wales) Ian Schubert	Eastern Suburbs Roosters	Fullback, Wing	0					
(New South Wales) Alan Thompson	Manly-Warringah Sea Eagles	Five-eighth	3					
(New South Wales) Ian Thomson	Manly-Warringah Sea Eagles	Prop	2					
(New South Wales) Bruce Walker	Manly-Warringah Sea Eagles	Prop, Second-row	0					
(New South Wales) Craig Young	St George Dragons	Prop	5					

== Great Britain leg ==
=== Test Venues ===
The three Ashes series tests took place at the following venues.

Wigan	Bradford	Leeds
Central Park	Odsal	Headingley
Capacity: 40,000	Capacity: 40,000	Capacity: 30,000

Saturday, 30 September	Blackpool Borough	1 – 39	Australia	Borough Park, Blackpool
	Tries: Goals:	[ Report]	Tries: Goals:	Attendance: 2,700

Sunday 1 October	Cumbria	4 – 47	Australia	Craven Park, Barrow
	Tries: Goals:	[ Report]	Tries: Goals:	Attendance: 5,964; Referee: Stan Wall

Wednesday 4 October	Great Britain U/24	8 – 30	Australia	Craven Park, Hull
	Tries: Goals:	[ Report]	Tries: Goals:	Attendance: 6,418; Referee: Fred Lindop

Sunday 8 October	Bradford Northern	11 – 21	Australia	Odsal, Bradford
	Tries: Goals:	[ Report]	Tries: Goals:	Attendance: 15,755

Wednesday 11 October	Warrington	15 – 12	Australia	Wilderspool, Warrington
	Tries: Goals:	[ Report]	Tries: Goals:	Attendance: 10,143

A controversial late Alan Gwilliam try gave Warrington a 15–12 win over Australia, with Steve Hesford kicking six goals. In the tourists' first lost match of the tour Warrington's packmen Tommy Martyn, Mike Nicholas, Tommy Cunningham and Roy Lester were in superb form, ably supported by replacement half backs Gwilliam and Clark. This was Warrington's eighth win over Australia since .

=== Wales ===
The Kangaroos played a non-test international against Wales at the St. Helen's Rugby Ground. As of 2024 this was the 13th and final rugby league international played at the ground.

Sunday, 15 October

Wales	3 – 8	Australia
Tries: Goals: David Watkins (1); Field Goals:: David Watkins		Tries: Bob Fulton; Tommy Raudonikis; Goals: Michael Cronin (1)

St Helen's Rugby Ground, Swansea
Attendance: 4,250
Referee: Ron Campbell

Wales	Australia

FB	1	David Watkins (c)
RW	2	Clive Sullivan
RC	3	David Willicombe
LC	4	Eddie Cunningham
LW	5	John Bevan
SO	6	Bill Francis
SH	7	Paul Woods
PR	8	Jim Mills
HK	9	Tony Fisher
PR	10	Mel James
SR	11	Glyn Shaw
SR	12	Trevor Skerrett
LK	13	Roy Mathias
Substitutions:
IC	14
IC	15
Coach:
(Wales) Kel Coslett

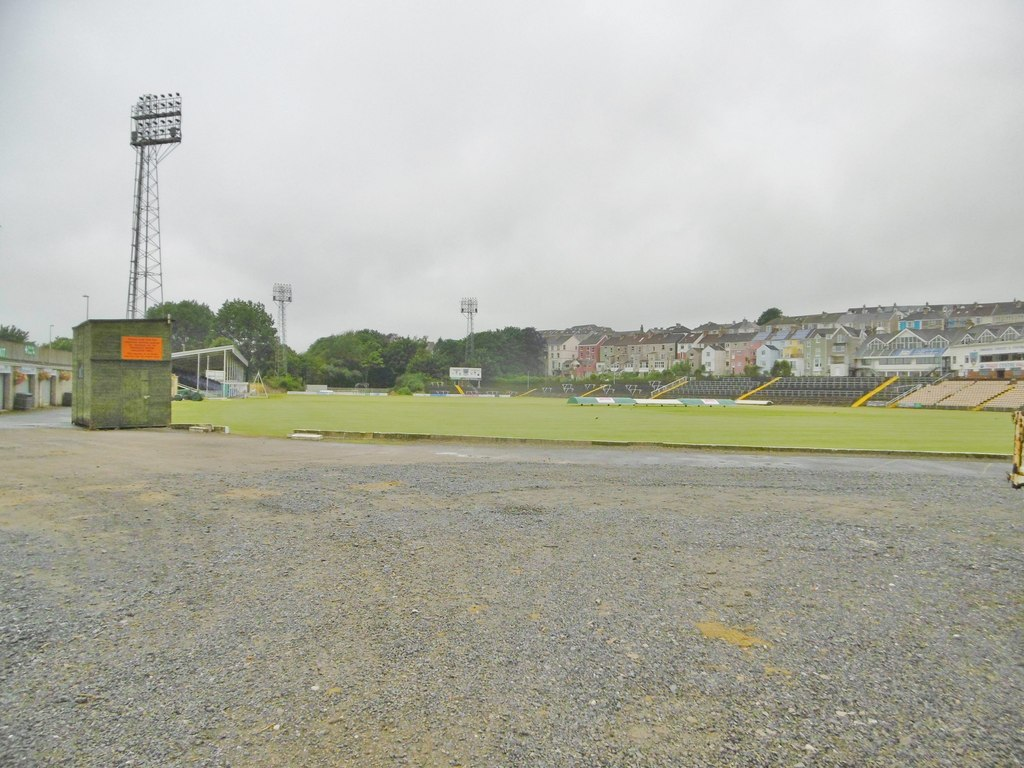

FB	1	Graham Eadie
LW	2	Ian Schubert
RC	3	Michael Cronin
LC	4	Steve Rogers
RW	5	Kerry Boustead
FE	6	Bob Fulton (c)
HB	7	Tommy Raudonikis
PR	8	Graham Olling
HK	9	George Peponis
PR	10	Ian Thomson
SR	11	Greg Pierce
SR	12	Rod Reddy
LF	13	Ray Price
Substitutions:
IC	14	Craig Young
IC	15	Alan Thompson
Coach:
(Australia) Frank Stanton

Kangaroos' vice captain Greg Pierce injured his knee in this match and made no more appearances on the tour.

Tuesday 17 October	Leeds	19 – 25	Australia	Headingley, Leeds
	Tries: Goals:	[ Report]	Tries: Goals:	Attendance: 9,781

=== 1st Ashes Test ===
This year Great Britain had the opportunity to re-gain the Ashes title on home soil. The Ashes series was styled the "Forward Chemicals Test series" due to sponsorship reasons.

Saturday 21 October

Great Britain	9 – 15	Australia
Tries: John Bevan Goals:: George Fairbairn (3)		Tries: Kerry Boustead; Bob Fulton; Goals:: Mick Cronin (4); Field Goals:: Bob Fulton

Central Park, Wigan
Attendance: 17,644
Referee: Ron Campbell (United Kingdom)
Player of the Match: Rod Reddy

Great Britain	Australia

FB	1	George Fairbairn
RW	2	Stuart Wright
RC	3	Eric Hughes
LC	4	Eddie Cunningham
LW	5	John Bevan
SO	6	Roger Millward (c)
SH	7	Steve Nash
PR	8	Jimmy Thompson
HK	9	David Ward
PR	10	Paul Rose
SR	11	George Nicholls
SR	12	Len Casey
LK	13	Steve Norton
Substitutions:
IC	14	John Holmes
IC	15	Phil Hogan
Coach:
(England) Peter Fox

FB	1	Graham Eadie
RW	2	Kerry Boustead
RC	3	Steve Rogers
LC	4	Michael Cronin
LW	5	Chris Anderson
FE	6	Bob Fulton (c)
HB	7	Tommy Raudonikis
PR	8	Graham Olling
HK	9	Max Krilich
PR	10	Craig Young
SR	11	Geoff Gerard
SR	12	Rod Reddy
LF	13	Ray Price
Substitutions:
IC	14	Steve Kneen
IC	15
Coach:
(Australia) Frank Stanton

Great Britain were trailing 6-7 with fifteen minutes remaining when an Australian pass went to ground and Welsh winger John Bevan kicked the ball ahead. It was then a foot race between him and Australian fullback Graham Eadie to reach the ball which was slowing within Australia's in-goal area. Both players stumbled and dived, with Bevan getting a hand on the ball and claiming the try which was awarded, giving the home side a 9-7 lead. The Kangaroos then worked their way up to the other end of the field and moved the ball through the hands out to the right wing where Kerry Boustead crossed for a try, regaining his side the lead 9-10. In the final minutes Australian captain Bob Fulton forced his way over for a try which was also converted, so the match ended with the scoreline at 9-15.

Wednesday 25 October	Widnes	11 – 10	Australia	Naughton Park, Widnes
19:00	Tries: Stuart Wright; Goals:: Mick Burke (4)	[ Report]	Tries: Ian Schubert, Bruce Walker; Goals: Michael Cronin (2)	Attendance: 12,202; Referee: Ron Moore

Widnes: David Eckersley, Stuart Wright, Malcolm Aspey, Mick George, Mick Burke, Eric Hughes, Reg Bowden, Brian Hogan, Keith Elwell, Jim Mills, Mick Adams, David Hull, Doug Laughton (c). Coach - Doug Laughton

Australia: Allan McMahon, Ian Schubert, Michael Cronin (c), Alan Thompson, Chris Anderson, Steve Martin, Greg Oliphant, Rod Morris, Ron Hilditch, Ian Thomson, Geoff Gerard, Steve Kneen, Ray Price. Res - Bob Fulton, Bruce Walker

Widnes, the reigning British champions, were leading 7–2 half time. Up to and including the last Kangaroo tour in which Australia played English club teams as part of their schedule in 1994, this was the last game the Kangaroos lost to an English club side. This was also the only time in what would be 15 tour games between 1909–1990 that Widnes would defeat The Kangaroos. Their previous best result was a 13–all draw on 21 October 1937 during the 1937–38 tour.

Sunday 29 October	Hull F.C.	2 – 34	Australia	The Boulevard, Hull
	Tries: Goals:	[ Report]	Tries: Goals:	Attendance: 10,723

Wednesday 1 November	Salford	2 – 14	Australia	The Willows, Salford
	Tries: Goals:	[ Report]	Tries: Goals:	Attendance: 6,155

=== 2nd Ashes Test ===
Several changes were made to the Great Britain team, including a completely new front row. This match was broadcast live.

Sunday 5 November

Great Britain	18 – 14	Australia
Tries: Stuart Wright (2) Goals: George Fairbairn (6)		Tries: Ray Price; Steve Rogers; Goals: Mick Cronin ( 2 ) Steve Rogers (2)

Odsal, Bradford
Attendance: 26,761
Referee: Mick Naughton (United Kingdom)
Player of the Match: Brian Lockwood

Great Britain	Australia

FB	1	George Fairbairn
RW	2	Stuart Wright
RC	3	John Joyner
LC	4	Les Dyl
LW	5	John Atkinson
SO	6	Roger Millward (c)
SH	7	Steve Nash
PR	8	Jim Mills
HK	9	Tony Fisher
PR	10	Brian Lockwood
SR	11	George Nicholls
SR	12	Phil Lowe
LK	13	Steve Norton
Substitutions:
IC	14	John Holmes
IC	15	Paul Rose
Coach:
(England) Peter Fox

FB	1	Graham Eadie
RW	2	Kerry Boustead
RC	3	Steve Rogers
LC	4	Michael Cronin
LW	5	Chris Anderson
FE	6	Bob Fulton (c)
HB	7	Tommy Raudonikis
PR	8	Graham Olling
HK	9	Max Krilich
PR	10	Craig Young
SR	11	Geoff Gerard
SR	12	Rod Reddy
LF	13	Ray Price
Substitutions:
IC	14	Alan Thompson
IC	15	Les Boyd
Coach:
(Australia) Frank Stanton

In the final minutes of the first half the British had just made their way into Australia's half of the field when they made a break up the middle through Roger Millward. He then kicked the ball ahead as he was being tackled and his winger Stuart Wright was chasing through to get a hand on it and score. The try was converted so the home side led at the break 11 – 4.

In the second half Britain's right centre John Joyner made a break and popped a pass over to his winger Stuart Wright to cross once again. They won the match 18–14 to bring the series to 1-all.

This would be the last time Great Britain beat Australia in a Test match for another ten years.

Wednesday 8 November	Wigan	2 – 28	Australia	Central Park, Wigan
19:30	Tries: Goals: George Fairbairn (1)	[ Report]	Tries: Larry Corowa (2), Steve Rogers (2), Bruce Walker, Allan McMahon; Goals: Michael Cronin (5)	Attendance: 10,645; Referee: Peter Massey

Wigan: George Fairbairn, Dennis Ramsdale, David Willicombe, Alan Greenall, Jimmy Hornby, Keiron O'Loughlin, Bernard Coyle, John Wood, Tony Karalius, Steve O'Neill, John Foran, Bill Melling, Dennis Boyd. Res - Malcolm Swann, David Regan. Coach - Vince Karalius

Australia: Allan McMahon, Larry Corowa, Steve Rogers, Michael Cronin, Ian Schubert, Alan Thompson, Steve Martin, Ian Thomson, Ron Hilditch, Rod Morris, Geoff Gerard, Les Boyd, Bruce Walker

At half time Wigan trailed Australia 2 – 5.

In a Leeds bar, a member of Surrey rock band The Jam, Paul Weller, glassed the face of Jim Caldwell, the team manager from Queensland. Australian player Larry Corowa ran to defend the bloodied Caldwell, was punched from behind himself and raced into a nearby bar to get teammates to provide reinforcements for the brawl that ensued. One member of The Jam landed in hospital with broken ribs and another was reported at the time to have been charged with assault. The official police statement cleared the Australians of any wrongdoing.

Sunday 12 November	St. Helens	4 – 26	Australia	Knowsley Road, St. Helens
	Tries: Goals:	[ Report]	Tries: Goals:	Attendance: 16,352

The game against St Helens saw the largest non-test attendance of the tour of 16,532.

Tuesday 14 November	York	2 – 29	Australia	Clarence Street, York
	Tries: Goals:	[ Report]	Tries: Goals:	Attendance: 5,155

=== 3rd Ashes Test ===
Warrington's John Bevan came into the centres for Leeds star Les Dyl, while Hull F.C. prop Vince Farrar made his Great Britain debut in place of second test Man of the Match, Hull Kingston Rovers' forward Brian Lockwood who was unavailable due to injury. The Kangaroos maintained the same backline from the 2nd Test, but brought George Peponis, Rod Morris and Les Boyd into their forward pack.

Saturday 18 November
15:00

Great Britain	6 – 23	Australia
Tries: John Bevan; Roger Millward Goals:		Tries: Les Boyd; Geoff Gerard; George Peponis; Tom Raudonikis; Goals: Mick Cronin (5/6); Field Goals: Bob Fulton (1)

Headingley, Leeds
Attendance: 30,604
Referee: Mick Naughton (United Kingdom)
Player of the Match: Tom Raudonikis

Great Britain	Australia

FB	1	George Fairbairn
RW	2	Stuart Wright
RC	3	John Joyner
LC	4	John Bevan
LW	5	John Atkinson
SO	6	Roger Millward (c)
SH	7	Steve Nash
PR	8	Jim Mills
HK	9	Tony Fisher
PR	10	Vince Farrar
SR	11	George Nicholls
SR	12	Phil Lowe
LK	13	Steve Norton
Substitutions:
IC	14	John Holmes
IC	15	Paul Rose
Coach:
(England) Peter Fox

FB	1	Graham Eadie
RW	2	Kerry Boustead
RC	3	Steve Rogers
LC	4	Michael Cronin
LW	5	Chris Anderson
FE	6	Bob Fulton (c)
HB	7	Tommy Raudonikis
PR	8	Craig Young
HK	9	George Peponis
PR	10	Rod Morris
SR	11	Geoff Gerard
SR	12	Les Boyd
LF	13	Ray Price
Substitutions:
IC	14	Alan Thompson
IC	15	Ian Thomson
Coach:
(Australia) Frank Stanton

The deciding test attracted the largest attendance of any match on the tour. After two penalty goals by Mick Cronin Australia led by 4 points to nil. The Kangaroos then got the first try of the match with a close-range dive from George Peponis at dummy-half. The conversion by Cronin was successful so Australia led 9 – 0. The visitors scored another try when the ball was passed from dummy-half to a steamrolling Les Boyd who raced through to score under the goal posts, bringing the lead to 12 – 0. Later, after making a break and crossing the half-way line Raudonikis passed to Geoff Gerard who ran the remaining metres to score untouched, making the score 17 – 0.

Australian fullback Graham Eadie crossed early in the second half but the try was controversially disallowed for a forward pass. Bob Fulton took the Australians' lead out to 20–0 with a drop-goal early in the second half. Great Britain scored the first try of the second half when 31-year-old Roger Millward, captaining Great Britain for the last time, reached out of a tackle and bounced the ball off the turf of the Australian in-goal area. The home side scored again when they moved the ball through the hands out to the left wing where Bevan dived over in the corner. The Kangaroos scored next when Raudonikis, directly from a scrum win, ran through and put the ball down.

Australia therefore retained the Ashes with the first of a fourteen-year winning streak between these two sides that would last until 1988.

== France leg ==
Wednesday 22 November	Catalan XIII	15 – 26	Australia	Stade Gilbert Brutus, Perpignan
	Tries: Goals:	[ Report]	Tries: Goals:	Attendance: 2,270

=== 1st Test ===
Steve Martin was selected to make his Test debut.

Sunday 26 November

France	13 – 10	Australia
Tries: Michel Naudo Goals: José Moya (5)		Tries: Michael Cronin; Graham Eadie; Goals: Michael Cronin (2)

Stade d'Albert Domec, Carcassonne
Attendance: 7,000
Referee: Andre Breysse (France)

France	Australia

FB	1	Francis Tranier
RW	2	José Moya
RC	3	Christian Laumond
LC	4	Michel Naudo
LW	5	Philippe Fourcade
SO	6	Éric Waligunda
SH	7	Ivan Grésèque
PR	8	Henri Daniel
HK	9	André Malacamp
PR	10	Delphin Castanon
SR	11	Didier Hermet
SR	12	Charles Zalduendo
LK	13	Michel Maïque (c)
Substitutions:
IC	14
IC	15
Coach:
(France) Roger Garrigue

FB	1	Graham Eadie
RW	2	Kerry Boustead
RC	3	Michael Cronin
LC	4	Steve Martin
LW	5	Chris Anderson
FE	6	Bob Fulton (c)
HB	7	Tommy Raudonikis
PR	8	Craig Young
HK	9	George Peponis
PR	10	Rod Morris
SR	11	Geoff Gerard
SR	12	Les Boyd
LF	13	Ray Price
Substitutions:
IC	14
IC	15
Coach:
(Australia) Frank Stanton

France won the first Test 13–10 at Stade Albert Domec in Carcassonne.

Wednesday 29 November	Côte d'Azur	7 – 29	Australia	Parc des Sports, Avignon
	Tries: Goals:	[ Report]	Tries: Goals:	Attendance: 645

Sunday 3 December	Les Espoirs (Colts)	20 – 5	Australia	Stade Municipal d'Albi, Albi
	Tries: Goals:	[ Report]	Tries: Goals:	Attendance: 1,600

Wednesday, 6 December	Midi-Pyrénées XIII	7 – 36	Australia
	Tries: Goals:	[ Report]	Tries: Goals:	Attendance: 1,627

=== 2nd Test ===
Sunday 10 December

France	11 – 10	Australia
Tries: Michel Naudo Goals: José Moya (3); Field Goals: Jean-Marc Bourret (1); Éric Waligunda (1)		Tries: Kerry Boustead; Steve Rogers; Goals: Michael Cronin (2)

Stadium Municipal, Toulouse
Attendance: 6,500
Referee: P Laverny (France)

France	Australia

FB	1	Francis Tranier
RW	2	José Moya
RC	3	Christian Laumond
LC	4	Michel Naudo
LW	5	Gerard Borreil
SO	6	Éric Waligunda
SH	7	Jean-Louis Castel
PR	8	Henri Daniel
HK	9	André Malacamp
PR	10	Delphin Castanon
SR	11	Didier Hermet
SR	12	Charles Zalduendo
LK	13	Michel Maïque (c)
Substitutions:
IC	14	Jean-Marc Bourret
IC	15	Joël Roosebrouck
Coach:
(France) Roger Garrigue

FB	1	Graham Eadie
RW	2	Kerry Boustead
RC	3	Steve Rogers
LC	4	Michael Cronin
LW	5	Chris Anderson
FE	6	Bob Fulton (c)
HB	7	Tommy Raudonikis
PR	8	Ian Thomson
HK	9	Ron Hilditch
PR	10	Craig Young
SR	11	Geoff Gerard
SR	12	Rod Reddy
LF	13	Ray Price
Substitutions:
IC	14	Graham Olling
IC	15	Alan Thompson
Coach:
(Australia) Frank Stanton

The referee was Mr Laverny from Bordeaux. France were coached by Roger Garrigue. Their line-up included world class players, lock, Joël Roosebrouck and prop, Didier Hermet from Villeneuve-Sur-Lot, and Jean-Marc Bourret in the centres. Ron Hilditch played at hooker in place of Max Krilich who was injured. France claimed a 2–0 series win over the touring Kangaroos with an 11–10 result at the Stade Municipal, Toulouse in front of 6,500 spectators.

France thus became the last team to record successive victories against Australia in a single series. This would be the last time the Kangaroos failed to win a series or tournament until the 2005 Tri-Nations.

== Statistics ==
Leading Try Scorer

- 9 by Bob Fulton

Leading Point Scorer

- 142 by Michael Cronin

Largest Attendance

- 30,604 - Third test vs Great Britain at Headingley Stadium

Largest Club Game Attendance

- 16,352 - St. Helens vs Australia at Knowsley Road
