= Raudonikis =

Raudonikis is a Lithuanian surname. Notable people with the surname include:

- Lincoln Raudonikis (born 1977), Australian rugby league footballer, son of Tommy
- Tommy Raudonikis (1950−2021), Australian rugby league footballer and coach
