= Ross Henrick =

Australian rugby league footballer (1954–2005)

Personal information
- Born: 7 December 1954
- Died: 8 May 2005 (aged 50)

Playing information
- Position: Halfback
Club
Years	Team	Pld	T	G	FG	P
1974–77	Northern Suburbs
1978	Redcliffe
1979–82	Northern Suburbs
1983–85	Fortitude Valley
	Total	0	0	0	0	0
Representative
Years	Team	Pld	T	G	FG	P
1980–84	Queensland	7	3	0	0

Coaching information
Club
Years	Team	Gms	W	D	L	W%
1988	Seagulls-Diehards	20	13	1	6	65
1989–90	Fortitude Valley	40	33	0	7	83
	Total	60	46	1	13	77

Ross Henrick (7 December 1954 – 8 May 2005) was an Australian rugby league footballer who played in the 1970s and 1980s. Nicknamed "The Angry Ant", he was a Queensland State of Origin representative halfback, and played club football in the Brisbane Rugby League premiership for Fortitude Valley, Norths and Redcliffe.

Henrick played at halfback and scored a try in Norths' victory in the 1980 Brisbane Rugby League Grand Final.

Henrick was Wally Lewis' partner in the halves for Queensland's victory in the 1981 State of Origin game, the second ever. He was selected on Queensland's bench for Game II of the 1983 State of Origin series. His final appearance for Queensland was at halfback in Game III of the 1984 State of Origin series.

Henrick later coached Fortitude Valley, winning three BRL premierships with them.

From 1993 to 1999 Henrick coached Wavell State High School's rugby league team.
