= Penalty box =

Sports term

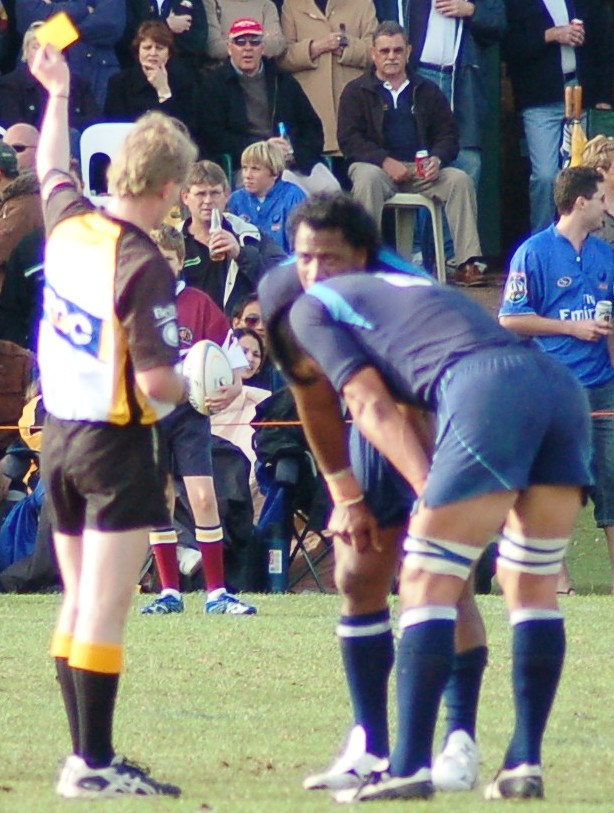
A rugby union player being sent to the "sin bin"

The penalty box or sin bin (sometimes called the bad box, or simply bin or box) is the area in ice hockey, rugby union, rugby league, roller derby and some other sports where a player sits to serve the time of a given penalty, for an offence not severe enough to merit outright expulsion from the contest. Teams are generally not allowed to replace players who have been sent to the penalty box.

== Ice hockey ==
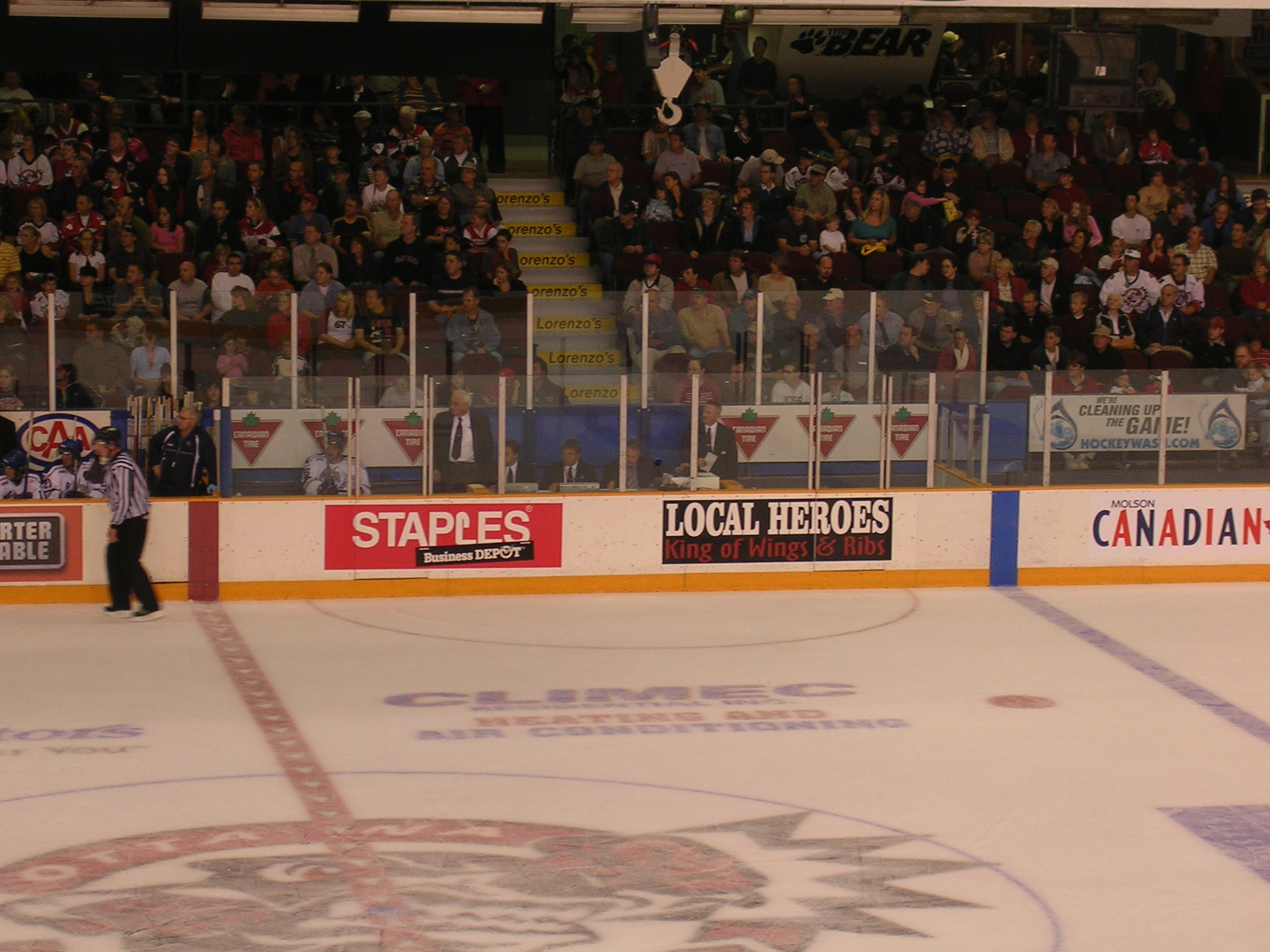
The penalty boxes in this ice hockey arena are between the centre red line and one of the blue lines. In the photo, only the left-hand box is occupied.

Ice hockey has popularized the term "penalty box". In most cases it is a small isolated bench surrounded by walls on all four sides, with the side facing the ice having the access door. There are typically two penalty boxes: one for each team. In ice hockey a period in the box occurs for all penalties unless circumstances call for an ejection or a penalty shot. If three or more players are serving penalties at once, the team will continue playing with three on the ice but will not be allowed to use the players in the box until their penalties expire.

Most leagues specify that a team cannot replace on the ice a member serving a minor (2-minute) penalty. This results in situations such as the power play, in which the opposing team outnumbers the penalized team, and (in the event of coincidental minor penalties) situations in which both teams must skate with one fewer player on the ice.

If a team scores a goal while one or more of the opposing team is serving a non-coincidental minor penalty, the penalty with the least time remaining is cancelled, and the player serving that penalty may return to the ice. In the case of a double-minor (4-minute) penalty, the penalty is treated as two consecutive 2-minute penalties. If the opposing team scores, only the penalty currently being served is cancelled (e.g. a goal with a double-minor penalty clock at 3:45 is reset to 2:00); if at least one penalty interval remains, the penalty clock is reset to reflect this (two minutes if one interval remains, four minutes if two intervals remain) and the player must remain in the box; if less than two minutes remain, the remaining penalty is cancelled, and the player is released. A major (5-minute) or misconduct (10-minute) penalty must be served in full, regardless of the number of goals scored by the opposition. To keep play fair, coincidental minor penalties ("matching minor" penalties assessed to both teams simultaneously) are also served in full regardless of scoring. Goaltenders never go to the penalty box even though they are assessed penalty minutes (but they can incur an ejectable match penalty, in which case they are replaced by a substitute). Penalties against goaltenders or against the bench are served by a teammate; many leagues require such penalties to be served by a player who was on the ice when the infraction occurred.

== Rugby league ==
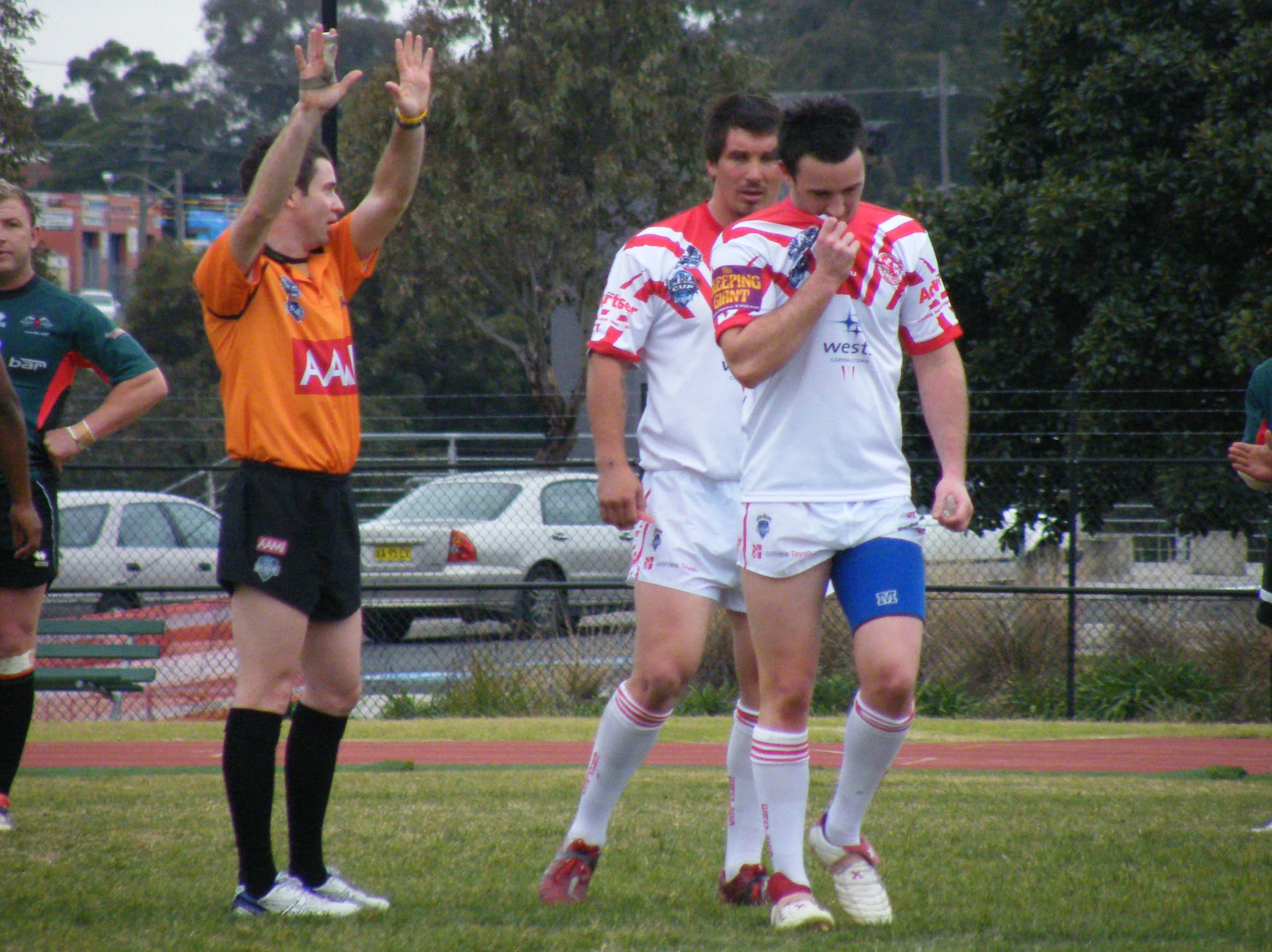
A rugby league referee giving a "sin bin" ruling, signifying the ten minutes that the offender must spend off the field

In rugby league, penalties involving violent play, dangerous play, professional fouls or repetitive commission of a specific offence can result in a sin binning, where the offending player must spend 10 minutes off the field. In Australia and New Zealand, the referee will raise both hands and spread his digits to indicate "10 minutes"; in Europe, the yellow card is used.

Often, if a team is committing one offence repeatedly, the referee will warn the captain that the next time they commit that offence, the player responsible will be sent to the bin. In the Super League and other UK based competitions, the referee will face the offending team and circle one arm towards them to signal a team warning; this saves time and also allows for fans to see that the next player responsible for a penalty will be sent to the sin bin indefinitely (if there has not been a sufficient change in attitude from the team). For the most serious offences and/or repeated misconduct, the referee may send off players, who take no further part in the game and leave their team a player short. Referees also have the power to send team officials to the stands.

In 1981 Australia's New South Wales Rugby Football League introduced the use of the sin bin and that year Newtown Jets hooker Barry Jensen became the first player sent to it.

In the National Rugby League, there is no physical sin bin. Players must serve their punishment in the dressing room; remaining on the sideline or in the stands is not permitted. However, in the Super League and other UK based competitions, a player sent to the sin bin will usually sit on the bench and will wear a 'bib'; they do have the option of going into the dressing room if they please.

== Rugby union ==
Use of the sin bin was introduced to rugby union in 2001 for players receiving a yellow card. The suspension period lasts 10 minutes of playing time; when the game clock stops, the suspension countdown stops as well. The game clock does not stop after the regulation 40 minutes per half; this led to the unusual situation in a 2017 France–Wales match where multiple scrum resets meant Samson Lee, sent to the sin bin in the 41st minute, rejoined the same scrum in the 51st minute.

A sin-binned or sent-off player may be replaced if he plays in the front row of the scrum (prop or hooker) and the team has a substitute available who is capable of filling that player's position. This allows contested scrums to continue during the player's suspension. In this instance, the team must remove one player from another position for the duration of the suspension. The referee usually signals such infringements by displaying a yellow card.

In rugby union sevens, the sending-off period is 2 minutes, which despite being eight minutes shorter, is actually a more severe penalty for two reasons: first, a normal sevens match lasts only 14 minutes instead of the 80 used in 15-man union or 13-man league, meaning that the penalty lasts one seventh (14.3%) as opposed to one eighth (12.5%) of the match, and second, during this time, the offender's team must play without one seventh of their team; this opens up more space than losing one thirteenth or one fifteenth of the side.

== Other sports ==
The following sports use penalty boxes (by that or another name) in some form:

- Association football (low-level games only)
- Bandy
- Field hockey: In outdoor field hockey, there is no designated area and players must serve their suspensions in the spectator area. In indoor field hockey suspensions are served in the suspension area.
- Floorball: Usually referred to as a penalty bench.
- Handball: There is no designated area and players usually serve suspensions on their team's bench.
- International Rules football
- Lacrosse
- Ringette
- Roller derby
- Water polo

The hybrid sport of International Rules football presents a slight anomaly since penalty boxes are native to neither of the sports from which International Rules was conceived, namely Gaelic football and Australian rules football (although the Gaelic Athletic Association did experiment with the idea, before moving on to another experimental format, which requires a player given a black card to be substituted).

Proposals to introduce penalty boxes in association football have been discussed by the International Football Association Board (IFAB). In 2017, IFAB approved temporary dismissals for cautionable offences; however, this is only permitted for youth, veterans, disability and grassroots football. Competitions' use of this system—rather than "normal" yellow cards—is optional, and there are variations in how it can be implemented. For 90-minute games, the length of the temporary dismissal is 10 minutes.

Some indoor soccer leagues and competitions, which often use the playing area layout, boards and benches of ice hockey, already use them. In small sided football (i.e., 5-, 6- and 7-a-side), "timed suspensions" are used, and indicated by a blue card, in addition to the traditional yellow for a caution. Periods of suspensions vary depending on the match length (e.g., a 25-minute-half match has a suspension of 5 minutes) and are defined in the competition's rules.

In professional wrestling, the promotion Total Nonstop Action Wrestling has used a penalty box in the King of the Mountain match, where instead of retrieving an object hanging above the ring, the winner is the first person to use a ladder to hang a championship belt above the ring—after having scored a pinfall or submission (pinfalls count anywhere) to earn the right to try. A wrestler who has been pinned or forced to submit must spend two minutes in a penalty box.

== See also ==
- Penalty (rugby)
- Professional foul
