= Larry Corowa =

Australia international rugby league footballer

Larry Corowa MBE
Personal information
- Full name: Larry John Corowa
- Born: 5 August 1957 (age 69) Murwillumbah, New South Wales, Australia

Playing information
- Height: 178 cm (5 ft 10 in)
- Weight: 79 kg (12 st 6 lb)
- Position: Wing
Club
Years	Team	Pld	T	G	FG	P
1978–83	Balmain Tigers	98	64	0	0	199
1991	Gold Coast Seagulls	2	1	0	0	4
	Total	100	65	0	0	203
Representative
Years	Team	Pld	T	G	FG	P
1978–79	New South Wales	5	5	0	0	15
1978–79	Australia	2	1	0	0	3

Larry John Corowa MBE (born 5 August 1957 in Murwillumbah, New South Wales) is an Indigenous Australian former professional rugby league footballer who played in the 1970s, 1980s and 1990s. An Australian international and New South Wales representative winger, he played club football at the Balmain Tigers for six seasons between 1978 and 1983, with two games for the Gold Coast Seagulls in the 1991 New South Wales Rugby League Premiership. Playing on the wing, Corowa became one of Rugby League's most prolific try scorers of his era. He is one of a select few players to have scored more than a try a game in a season of football in Australia.

He was appointed Member of the Order of the British Empire (MBE) in the 1980 New Year Honours for service to sport.

== Early life ==
Born on 5 August 1957, Corowa grew up in Tweed Heads, New South Wales, before moving to Canberra as a teenager to live with his uncle. He played rugby league at junior level while living in Tweed Heads, but gave up the sport after moving to Canberra until he was persuaded into a tryout with the Group 8 Rugby League club Woden Valley Rams in 1976.

== Playing career ==
After a successful season with the Rams, Corowa signed with the Queanbeyan Kangaroos in 1977. He came into prominence later that year after a five-try performance while representing Monaro in their 33–12 win against the Great Britain national team. Along with Queanbeyan team-mate Percy Knight, Corowa was signed by Sydney-based club Balmain ahead of the 1978 season.

In his first season with Balmain, he was the League's top try-scorer. At the end of his debut season with Balmain in 1978 in which he scored 24 tries, Larry Corowa was selected as a member of the 1978 Kangaroo tour, though he did not play a test on tour. He made his test debut for Australia during the 1979 Ashes series against the touring Great Britain Lions at Lang Park in Brisbane with the Kangaroos winning 35–0. He played in the first two games of the series for his only test appearances, scoring a try on debut at Lang Park. Nicknamed "The Black Flash", Corowa was considered during his time with Balmain to be 'the fastest player in the game' not only in Australia but the rest of the rugby league world. Larry Corowa is listed on the Australian Players Register as Kangaroo No. 516.

After retiring from First Grade league following the 1983 season, Corowa moved to the Gold Coast and became involved with the Gold Coast Seagulls. In 1991, at the age of 33 and after eight years in retirement, he played two games for the Seagulls, scoring a single try to take his overall tally to 65 tries from 100 games before retiring permanently.

== Post-playing ==
In 2003, Corowa was one of 19 players named in the Balmain Tigers Team of the Century. The Larry Corowa Shield is awarded to the winner of the Wests Tigers – Gold Coast Titans pre-season trial match. The inaugural match, played in 2008, was won by the Titans. Corowa retains a strong involvement with Indigenous Rugby League and has been an Australia Day Ambassador.

== Sources ==
- Alan Whiticker & Glen Hudson (2007). The Encyclopedia of Rugby League Players. Wetherill Park, New South Wales: Gary Allen Pty Ltd. p. 102. ISBN 978-1-877082-93-1.
- Gary Lester, ed. (1983). The Sun Book of Rugby League – 1983. Sydney: John Fairfax Marketing. ISBN 0-909558-83-3.
