= Brad Backer =

Australian rugby league footballer

Personal information
- Born: 19 July 1956 (age 69) Maryborough, Queensland, Australia

Playing information
- Position: Wing, Centre, Fullback
Club
Years	Team	Pld	T	G	FG	P
	Easts Tigers
	Wynnum Manly
	Total	0	0	0	0	0
Representative
Years	Team	Pld	T	G	FG	P
1979–82	Queensland	12	1	0	0	3

Brad Backer (born 19 July 1956) is an Australian former rugby league footballer who played in the 1980s. Primarily a winger, he was a member of the inaugural Queensland State of Origin team and won two premierships with the Easts Tigers.

== Playing career ==
A Maryborough junior, Backer played for Western Suburbs Bundaberg before moving to Brisbane to join the Easts Tigers.

In 1978, he started on the wing in Easts' 14–10 BRL Grand Final win over the Fortitude Valley Diehards. In 1979, he was selected for Queensland in the interstate series. In 1980, he started on the wing for Queensland in the inaugural State of Origin game. He represented Queensland the following two years in State of Origin, scoring a try in their 1981 win over New South Wales.

In 1983, Backer won his second BRL premiership for Easts, defeating the Redcliffe Dolphins in the Grand Final. He later joined the Wynnum Manly Seagulls.
