= Ron Quinn =

Australian rugby league footballer

Personal information
- Full name: Ronald Quinn
- Born: 3 April 1961 (age 65) Gerringong, New South Wales, Australia

Playing information
- Position: Five-eighth, Halfback, Centre
Club
Years	Team	Pld	T	G	FG	P
1983–86	Parramatta Eels	33	5	0	0	20
1987–88	Cronulla Sharks	37	4	0	0	16
	Total	70	9	0	0	36
- Source: As of 30 April 2019
- Relatives: Mick Cronin (cousin)

Ron Quinn is an Australian rugby league footballer who played in the 1980s. He played for the Parramatta Eels and Cronulla-Sutherland in the New South Wales Rugby League (NSWRL) competition. Quinn is the cousin of Parramatta legend Mick Cronin.

== Playing career ==
Quinn made his first grade debut for Parramatta against Penrith in Round 17 1983 at Penrith Park. Quinn made 5 appearances in 1983 but was not selected in the club's premiership victory over Manly. In 1984, Quinn played 16 times as Parramatta reached their fourth straight grand final against arch rivals Canterbury-Bankstown. Quinn played from the bench as Parramatta lost the match 6-4.

In 1985, Quinn featured in 11 games as Parramatta reached the preliminary final against Canterbury. Parramatta went on to lose the match in humiliating fashion 26-0. In 1986, Quinn only managed to make one final appearance for the club which was in Round 12 against Canberra scoring a try. Quinn subsequently missed out on playing in the club's 1986 premiership victory.

In 1987, Quinn joined Cronulla-Sutherland and made a career high 23 appearances in his first season. In 1988, Cronulla finished as minor premierships and were one of the favourites to take out the title. Cronulla went on the reach the preliminary final but were defeated 9-2 by Balmain ending one of the club's best ever seasons on a sour note. Quinn departed Cronulla following the end of the 1988 season. In 1990, Quinn captain-coached Gerringong to the Group 7 premiership.
