= Geoff Gerard =

Australia international rugby league footballer

Personal information
- Born: 10 July 1955 (age 70) Sydney, New South Wales, Australia

Playing information
- Position: Second-row, Prop, Centre
Club
Years	Team	Pld	T	G	FG	P
1974–80	Parramatta Eels	140	31	18	0	129
1976–77(loan)	→Wakefield Trinity
1981–84	Manly Warringah	85	4	0	0	13
1985–89	Penrith Panthers	102	3	0	0	12
1985–86(loan)	→Hull FC	23	6	0	0	24
	Total	350	44	18	0	178
Representative
Years	Team	Pld	T	G	FG	P
1979–83	New South Wales	3	2	0	0	6
1978–83	Australia	6	2	0	0	3

Geoff Gerard (born 10 July 1955) is an Australian former professional rugby league footballer who played in the 1970s and 1980s. An Australia international and New South Wales State of Origin representative forward, he played his club football with Sydney clubs Parramatta, Manly Warringah and Penrith, and also spent time with English clubs Wakefield Trinity and Hull FC. From the time of his retirement in early 1989 to mid-1994 he held the record for the most career New South Wales Rugby League premiership first-grade games until overtaken by Terry Lamb. He holds the distinction of playing in the most first-grade grand finals (four) without ever winning one.

== Background ==
Born in Sydney, Gerard attended Liverpool Boys High School and played his junior football with Cabramatta Two Blues.

== Career ==
=== Parramatta ===
Gerard was a local Parramatta junior and began his career as a centre with the team in 1974 and, in a disappointing side that only just avoided a third wooden spoon in five years, won the club's rookie of the year award.

Gerard soon shifted to the forwards and his game developed rapidly as the Eels advanced to the 1975 NSWRFL season's finals, and then the Grand Final in 1976. Gerard scored a try in that match but Eadie's wonderful goal-kicking gave Manly-Warringah a narrow win. The following year, Gerard played strongly throughout, and the Eels won the minor premiership for the first time. They went on to make their second consecutive Grand Final against the St. George Dragons which was drawn 9-all, however an aggressive and powerful St. George forward pack was far too much in the replay. The Dragons went on to win the replay 22–0.

1978 saw Gerard begin the most productive period of his career, winning Rugby League Week's 'Player of the Year' award and being selected for the 1978 Kangaroo tour despite not having played for New South Wales. He played in all five Tests in the second row, but did not represent Australia again until 1983. He is listed on the Australian Players Register as Kangaroo No. 518.

=== Manly-Warringah ===
In 1981, Gerard shifted to the Manly Warringah Sea Eagles and his move to the front row was widely criticized at the time, but he did so well in that role that he was close to selection for his second Kangaroo tour in 1982 despite a below-par performance in the Grand Final. Ultimately he was not selected to tour, but did play one final Test against New Zealand the following year, as well as play in the New South Wales side in the first two State of Origin matches of 1983. He played in both of Manly's Grand Final losses to his former club Parramatta in 1982 and 1983.

=== Penrith ===
In 1985, he shifted to the Penrith Panthers and also played for Hull F.C. in 1986–87. Often used as a "fresh reserve" after the NSWRL allowed them for the first time (previously all substitutes had to be players who had played reserve grade the same day), continued to play until 1989. During that year, he re-established himself as a regular member of Penrith's starting pack, and surpassed Bob O'Reilly's first grade record to become the first player to pass the 300 mark (most lists credit him with 303 games but the number is actually much greater because the Penrith club did not count his matches as a replacement player).

==== Milestones in 1989 ====
- surpassed Bob O'Reilly's record number of first grade games (284, against Newcastle in round four)
- surpassed Max Krilich's record number of games in all grades (against Easts in round twelve)
- became the first player ever to play 300 first grade games (against his former side Parramatta in round eighteen)

== Post-playing ==
In the late 1970s, Gerard was the editor of a rugby league publication called Rugby Leaguer which was a rival publication to the Big League magazine. In 1990 Gerard took over as coach of Penrith's reserve grade side. Despite taking them to the finals for two seasons, he moved to the Metropolitan Cup for 1992 and his time coaching Parramatta's reserves in 1994 and 1995 was disastrous. In 1998 he joined the NSW state selection panel.

Since 2002 the "Geoff Gerard Coach's Award" has been given to the Parramatta Eels' Premier League player of the year.
