= Chris Close =

Australia international rugby league footballer

Personal information
- Full name: Christopher Close
- Born: 5 February 1959 (age 67) Cunnamulla, Queensland, Australia

Playing information
- Position: Centre, Wing, Prop
Club
Years	Team	Pld	T	G	FG	P
19??–??	Beaudesert
1979	Fortitude Valley	16	12	0	0	36
1980–81	Redcliffe	28	17	0	0	51
1982–87	Manly-Warringah	100	39	0	0	154
1988–91	Gold Coast	67	4	0	0	16
1988–89	Hull Kingston Rovers	24	14	0	0	56
	Total	235	86	0	0	313
Representative
Years	Team	Pld	T	G	FG	P
1979	Brisbane		1	0	0	3
1979–86	Queensland	14	2	0	0	6
1980–85	Australia	3	1	0	0	4

Christopher "Choppy" Close (born 5 February 1959) is an Australian former professional rugby league footballer who played in the 1970s, 1980s and 1990s. A robust three-quarter back, he represented Australia internationally and Queensland in State of Origin, and played club football in Queensland and New South Wales. Close has the distinction of being one of a handful of players to be named man-of-the-match in State of Origin more than once. In fact the first two State of Origin man-of-the-match awards went to him.

== Playing career ==
=== Queensland Rugby League ===
Hailing from Cunnamulla, Queensland, where he started playing football in the 1970s. Close lived in Proston, Queensland playing for his junior rugby league for the Wondai Wolves. Close scored 52 tries during the 1978 season. Chris played his first A Grade game for the Beaudesert Kingfishers before joining Brisbane Rugby League premiership club, Valleys. A forward-sized centre who also excelled on the wing in his early career, Close represented Combined Brisbane in the 1979 Amco Cup competition and made his debut for Queensland the same year. He also played for Fortitude Valley at centre in their 1979 Brisbane Rugby League grand final victory over Souths.

In 1980, while playing for Redcliffe, Close was chosen on the Australian tour of New Zealand but it was his consecutive man-of-the-match performances in the first two State of Origin matches in 1980 and 1981 that turned heads. He was a fierce competitor, as his back-hander to the face of opposing winger Eric Grothe in 1981's State of Origin match testifies.

=== New South Wales Rugby League ===
Close signed with Manly-Warringah for the 1982 NSWRFL season and played in the Grand Final with them that year and again in 1983, which were both lost to Parramatta. Close continued to be a regular visitor to the State of Origin arena during the 1980s, becoming one of a handful of players to be man-of-the-match in State of Origin football more than once.

Surprisingly, after starring for Queensland, having toured New Zealand with the Australian team in 1980 and having played in Manly's Grand Final loss to Parramatta, Close was not selected to the 1982 Kangaroo Tour of Great Britain and France.

Close appeared in three Tests on the 1985 tour of New Zealand but failed to tour with the Kangaroos the following year.

After playing in Manly's reserve grade grand final loss in 1987, he linked with the newly formed Gold Coast club where his experience was used to good effect in the forwards.

=== Post-playing ===
After his retirement as a player, Close filled the role of Queensland State of Origin team manager under Paul Vautin (1995–97), Wayne Bennett (1998 & 2001–4) and Mark Murray (1999-00). In 2005, he famously stuck the middle finger up at former NSW coach Phil Gould at the end of an origin match. When asked about the incident in 2015, Close said "That was basically directed at one person not the whole bench, I got a great deal of enjoyment out of that, he used to call The Queensland spirit a myth and claimed we were always lucky, that was just euphoria coming out in that moment. In 2000 Close was awarded the Australian Sports Medal for his contribution to Australia's international standing in rugby league. He is currently working for QGC in Queensland as a Land Performance Adviser.

Close also lived in Rockhampton, Queensland for several years where he owned the Lionleigh Tavern in the suburb of Wandal, which became known for award-winning steaks under Close's ownership. During the time he lived in Rockhampton, he and his wife spent 18 months restoring a five-bedroom, four-bathroom Queenslander in the city's upper class suburb of The Range, which was expected to set a $2 million sale record when it was placed on the market in 2011.
