= Lincoln Raudonikis =

Australian rugby league footballer

Personal information
- Full name: Lincoln Raudonikis
- Born: 21 March 1977 (age 49) Sydney, New South Wales, Australia

Playing information
- Position: Second-row, Prop
Club
Years	Team	Pld	T	G	FG	P
1998–99	Western Suburbs	24	2	0	0	8
- Source: As of 31 May 2019
- Father: Tommy Raudonikis

Lincoln Raudonikis is an Australian former professional rugby league footballer who played in the 1990s. He played for the Western Suburbs Magpies in the NRL.

== Background ==
Raudonikis is the son of Western Suburbs legend and team of the century member Tommy Raudonikis.

== Playing career ==
Raudonikis made his first grade debut for Western Suburbs in Round 6 against South Sydney at the Sydney Football Stadium which ended in a 41–10 loss. Western Suburbs would go on to finish the 1998 season in last place winning only 4 games for the entire year but were handed the wooden spoon as the Gold Coast Chargers who had also finished bottom avoided last position due to a better for and against.

In 1999, Raudonikis played 8 games for the club in what proved to be their last season in the top grade as a stand-alone entity. Raudonikis played in the club's last game before their merger with fellow foundation club Balmain. Raudonikis played at prop as Wests were defeated 60-16 by the Auckland Warriors at Campbelltown Stadium. Western Suburbs would also finish last in 1999 winning only 3 games and conceded 944 points throughout the season which was an average of 39.33 per game, the most in league history.

Following the 1999 season, Raudonikis was not offered a contract to play with the newly formed Wests Tigers.
