= Steve Bowden =

Australian rugby league footballer (b. 1955)

Personal information
- Full name: Steve James Bowden
- Born: 27 May 1955 (age 71) Canterbury, New South Wales, Australia

Playing information
- Position: Prop
Club
Years	Team	Pld	T	G	FG	P
1978–82	Newtown Jets	76	15	0	0	45
Representative
Years	Team	Pld	T	G	FG	P
1981	New South Wales	1	0	0	0	0

Steve Bowden (born 27 May 1955) is an Australian former professional rugby league footballer who played in the 1970s and 1980s. He played for the Newtown Jets in the New South Wales Rugby League (NSWRL) competition. Bowden primarily played in the front row.

== Career ==
Bowden was selected in 1981 to represent New South Wales as a front-rower for the only State of Origin-designated game of the year. In that match, Bowden was sin-binned along with Queenslander Rod Morris after an all-in brawl.

Another fight cost Bowden a spot in the 1981 Grand Final. In the first few minutes of the major semi-final against Manly-Warringah, Bowden was involved in a fight with Manly's Kiwi prop Mark Broadhurst. A scrum devolved into an all-in brawl with Bowden and Broadhurst throwing punches like prize fighters. A head-butt from Bowden felled Broadhurst and Bowden continued to punch his face while he was on the ground. After the fight was broken up, Bowden again landed a head-butt on an already bloodied Broadhurst (who also had a broken cheekbone) and the fight started a second time. When order was finally restored the referee sent Bowden from the field and actually gave Newtown a penalty. Bowden was subsequently suspended and unable to take part in the Preliminary final against Eastern Suburbs, or the club's final ever first grade Grand Final appearance against Parramatta. Leading television commentator and former dual international Rex Mossop called it "The most frantic opening to a rugby league match I've seen in 35 years".

Bowden currently works security for world champion boxer Danny Green. Bowden now owns and operates the Hurstville Ritz Hotel in Sydney.
