= Barry Jensen =

Australian rugby league footballer

Barry ("Gunna') Jensen
Personal information
- Full name: Barry Jensen
- Born: 24 April 1956 (age 70) Balmain, New South Wales, Australia

Playing information
- Position: Hooker
Club
| Years | Team | Pld | T | G | FG | P |
|---|---|---|---|---|---|---|
| 1978–81 | Newtown Jets | 80 | 7 | 0 | 0 | 21 |
| 1982 | Illawarra Steelers | 10 | 0 | 0 | 0 | 0 |
| | Total | 90 | 7 | 0 | 0 | 21 |
Representative
| Years | Team | Pld | T | G | FG | P |
| 1981 | New South Wales | 1 | 0 | 0 | 0 | 0 |

Barry Jensen is a former professional rugby league footballer in the New South Wales Rugby League (NSWRL) competition. He primarily played at hooker. Jensen was a member of the Newtown Jets and Illawarra Steelers rugby league teams and also represented his state. He was also the first player to ever be sin binned in the N.S.W.R.L..

Jensen was selected to represent New South Wales as hooker for the only State of Origin game in 1981.

Jensen's rugby league career came to an end midway through 1982. He played his last game for Illawarra in round 18 and retired due to a neck injury.
