= Mick Cronin (rugby league) =

Australian RL coach and former Australia international rugby league footballer

Mick Cronin OAM
Personal information
- Full name: Michael William Cronin
- Born: 28 June 1951 (age 75) Kiama, New South Wales, Australia

Playing information
- Height: 178 cm (5 ft 10 in)
- Weight: 92 kg (14 st 7 lb)
- Position: Centre
Club
Years	Team	Pld	T	G	FG	P
1969–76	Gerringong
1977–86	Parramatta Eels	216	75	865	2	1971
	Total	216	75	865	2	1971
Representative
Years	Team	Pld	T	G	FG	P
1973–76	Country NSW	4	2	9	0	24
1977–82	City NSW	6	3	41	0	91
1973–83	New South Wales	25	7	81	0	183
1973–82	Australia	33	9	139	0	305

Coaching information
Club
Years	Team	Gms	W	D	L	W%
1990–93	Parramatta Eels	88	33	2	53	38
Representative
Years	Team	Gms	W	D	L	W%
1992	Country NSW	1	1	0	0	100
- Source: Rugby League Project, Yesterday's Hero
- Relatives: Ron Quinn (cousin)

Michael William Cronin OAM (born 28 June 1951) is an Australian former professional rugby league footballer and coach. He was a goal-kicking centre for the Australian national team and a stalwart for the Parramatta Eels club. He played in 22 Tests and 11 World Cup matches between 1973 and 1982. Cronin retired as the NSWRL Premiership's and the Australian Kangaroos' all-time highest point-scorer and has since been named amongst the nation's finest footballers of the 20th century.

== Country and early representative career ==
Cronin played for Christian Brothers (now Edmund Rice) in the Illawarra competition as an under 12. He was so good that when his team made the semi-finals the opposition appealed against Cronin's inclusion on residence grounds, claiming he was from Gerringong.

Cronin's first grade career began in 1969 for Gerringong. He was selected to play for Country in 1973 where he impressed enough to make that year's Kangaroo tour. He played in two Tests and ten minor tour matches and finished as the tour's highest point scorer with seven tries and twenty eight goals. He and Rohan Hancock (Queensland) are the last players to be selected for the Kangaroos from Country Rugby League. In 1974 he was named New South Wales' Country Rugby League Player of the Year. He played in all three Tests of the 1974 domestic Ashes series against Great Britain and the following year he played in NSW Country's historic 1975 win over Sydney City. He was selected in Australia's 1975 World Cup squad and played in five matches in the tournament in the centres alongside Bob Fulton. In a match against Wales in Sydney during the series, he kicked nine goals.

By this time, Cronin had become a prominent rugby league centre. Despite receiving offers to move to Sydney, he continued to play for his hometown club of Gerringong on the New South Wales South Coast, where a field was later named in his honour.

== Parramatta career ==
In 1977 Cronin joined the Parramatta Eels but for many years continued to commute to training and matches from Gerringong where he owned and was publican of the local hotel. He played at centre for New South Wales in the inaugural 1980 State of Origin game.

Cronin was a member of Parramatta's backlines of the early 1980s playing alongside Brett Kenny, Steve Ella, Peter Sterling and Eric Grothe. He played in four winning Grand Finals for Parramatta (1981, 1982, 1983 and 1986). Alongside teammate Ray Price, Cronin played his final match in the 1986 Grand Final where he kicked both goals in the Eels' 4–2 victory over Canterbury-Bankstown.

Cronin played 216 games in ten years with Parramatta placing him equal fourth with Bob O'Reilly on the list of most first grade appearances. His club point scoring tally of 1,971 points (75 tries, 865 goals and 2 field goals) is the standing Parramatta record and is over 150 points clear of the next contender Luke Burt. He kicked 11 goals in a round 14 match of 1982 against the Illawarra Steelers, and 10 goals in the round 22 clash of 1978 against the Newtown Jets. He twice scored 27 points in a match for Parramatta.

In 1985 he overtook Graham Eadie's record for the most points scored in an NSWRFL career (1,917); Cronin's eventual total of 1,971 stood as the new career record for sixteen seasons until it was bettered by Daryl Halligan in 2000.

== Later representative career ==
The 1978 Kangaroo tour was Cronin's second, and he played in all five Tests plus 12 minor matches again returning home as the tour's highest point scorer with 142 points. He played in all Tests of the 1979 domestic Ashes series against Great Britain kicking 24 goals in the course of the three games. He played in seven Tests over three series against New Zealand in 1978, 1980 and 1982 before he retired from international representative football.

In 22 Tests for Australia between 1973 and 1982 he scored 5 tries and 93 goals for 201 points. Aside from Cronin's first 5 Tests in 1973 and 1974 when Graeme Langlands was captain and goal kicker, Mick Cronin was Australia's first choice kicker in his next seventeen Test appearances.

== State of origin career ==
Cronin made 21 appearances for New South Wales Blues up till 1981 under the old place of residence rules. He played in the inaugural State of Origin match in 1980 and made five further appearances for the Blues under the origin criteria up till the game III in 1983, despite having retired from international representative availability in 1982.

Mick Cronin's name was etched into Origin folklore that first night in July 1980 when, seventeen minutes into the second-half, his Parramatta club teammate Arthur Beetson pirouetted in from the right side while Cronin was held up in a tackle by Queensland half Greg Oliphant, and threw a loose left-arm around Cronin's chin. To this day that incident is cited in evidence that, from the outset, State of Origin football was "the real deal" where deeply rooted State passion would take priority over club friendships and loyalties. State of Origin rugby league has ever since been promoted as "state against state, mate against mate". This archrivalry was typified by the Cronin/Beetson altercation; notwithstanding that it was quickly forgotten and that they sat next to each other on the return plane trip to Sydney and did not mention the incident.

Altogether Cronin represented New South Wales 27 times from 1973 to 1983, scoring 7 tries, 87 goals for 195 points.

== Point scoring feats ==
When he retired in 1986 he was the greatest point-scorer in the history of the NSWRL premiership with 1,971 points and other point-scoring honours include:
• Country record of 316 pts in 20 Group 7 matches in 1971
• Most points in a club season (282 in 1978) – the standing Parramatta club record.
• Most points in a calendar year (547 from 52 games in 1978)
• Most points by a player from any country in World Cup clashes (108)
• Most points in the world in Tests (199)
• Most points in a Test series (54 against Great Britain 1979)
• Most successive successful kicks for goal in top-grade rugby league (26 in 1978).
• Leading point-scorer in 1977, 1978, 1979, 1982 & 1985

== Coaching ==
In 1990 he took on the coaching responsibility at Parramatta in a period when their playing roster was at its weakest for years. In 1992, he coached a Country origin side to victory over City origin. He coached the Parramatta club until the end of the 1993 NSWRL season.

In 2009 he coached the Gerringong Lions in the Group 7 Rugby League competition until stepping down from the top job after winning a premiership in 2020. He won 5 premierships as coach with the Lions(2010,2013,2015,2016,2020)

== Accolades ==
Cronin was named "Country Player of the Year" in 1974. He won unprecedented consecutive Rothmans Medals in 1977–78. In 1985 he was awarded the Medal of the Order of Australia "in recognition of service to the sport of Rugby League Football". Cronin received the Australian Sports Medal in 2000 and was honoured further in 2001 by being awarded the Centenary Medal "for service to Australian society through the sport of Rugby League".

At the 2007 Dally M Awards Cronin was inducted into the Australian Rugby League Hall of Fame.

In February 2008, Cronin was named in the list of Australia's 100 Greatest Players (1908–2007) which was commissioned by the NRL and ARL to celebrate the code's centenary year in Australia.

The eastern grandstand of Western Sydney Stadium is named the Mick Cronin Stand in his honour.

Sporting positions
Preceded by Graham Eadie; 1983	Record-holder; Most points in an NSWRFL/NRL career 1985 (1,918) – 2000 (1,971)	Succeeded by Daryl Halligan; 2000
Preceded by Eric Simms; 1969–1977	Record-holder; Most points in an NRL season 1978–1998	Succeeded by Ivan Cleary; 1998–2004
