= Graeme O'Grady =

Australian rugby league footballer

Personal information
- Full name: Graeme O'Grady
- Born: 14 August 1953 (age 73) Australia

Playing information
- Height: 173 cm (5 ft 8 in)
- Weight: 79.5 kg (12 st 7 lb)
- Position: Five-eighth, Lock
Club
Years	Team	Pld	T	G	FG	P
1974–79	Western Suburbs	95	21	3	3	72
1980–82	Newtown	68	13	7	0	53
1983–85	St George	61	5	0	0	20
	Total	224	39	10	3	145
Representative
Years	Team	Pld	T	G	FG	P
1981	New South Wales	1	0	0	0	0

Graeme O'Grady (born 14 August 1953) is an Australian former professional rugby league footballer in the New South Wales Rugby League (NSWRL) competition. He played for the Western Suburbs Magpies, Newtown Jets and St. George Dragons and one state representative appearance. O'Grady primarily played at lock.

== Club career ==
A small player, even by the standards of his time, O'Grady was described as, "A tough, nuggetty player with a good step and effective kicking game," and, less flatteringly, as, "a refugee from a garden gnome colony."

After six games with Western Suburbs in 1974, O'Grady spent the following year at Wests Illawarra before being recalled to first grade in 1976. From that point on, O'Grady was a regular in the Magpies team. In 1977, O'Grady was selected as the Amco Cup's Player of the Series after Wests defeated Easts in the Grand Final of the mid-week competition.

In round 14 of 1978, O'Grady scored two tries and a field-goal in a victory over Penrith. He had been heavily tackled earlier in the game, and was, "in considerable pain from a badly bruised neck." He played lock in the semi-finals in 1978, as the Magpies went as far as the preliminary final.

In 1980, he followed his former club-captain Tommy Raudonikis to Newtown as part of, "probably the biggest buying splurge in the club's history." He spent the next three seasons there under former Magpies lower-grade coach Warren Ryan. In his first season at the club, he played 7 games at fullback after Phil Sigsworth suffered a jaw injury. He was a member of the Newtown side that went down by 11–20 to Parramatta in the 1981 Grand Final, scoring a try in the first half.

Joining former coach Roy Masters, O'Grady finished his first-grade career with three seasons with St. George Dragons from 1983. He announced his intention to retire before the 1985 Grand Final, taking his place in the starting team after an injury to John Fifita. The Dragons lost the game by a single point to the Canterbury Bulldogs.

O'Grady retired to the Gold Coast in 1985 and captain-coached a Group 18 team, Cudgen Hornets, to premierships in 1986 and 1988. and remained involved with the club for decades afterwards. He played for the Northern Rivers team in the Country Championships in 1986, and then captained the same side to victory in 1987. O'Grady was named at five-eighth in the Western Suburbs Team of the Seventies.

== Representative ==
O'Grady was selected as a reserve to represent New South Wales in the sole Origin game of 1981, but did not get any time on the paddock.
