= Ron Hilditch =

Australian RL coach and former Australia international rugby league footballer

Personal information
- Full name: Ron Paul Hilditch
- Born: 13 August 1953 (age 72) Sydney, New South Wales, Australia

Playing information
- Position: Prop, Hooker
Club
Years	Team	Pld	T	G	FG	P
1975–83	Parramatta Eels	156	24	0	0	72
Representative
Years	Team	Pld	T	G	FG	P
1978–81	Australia	3	0	0	0	0
1981	New South Wales	4	0	0	0	0
1982	NSW City	1	0	0	0	0

Coaching information
Club
Years	Team	Gms	W	D	L	W%
1989–90	Illawarra Steelers	44	13	2	29	30
1994–96	Parramatta Eels	65	19	2	44	29
	Total	109	32	4	73	29
- Source: Rugby League Project

Ron Hilditch (born 13 August 1953) is an Australian former professional rugby league footballer and coach. An Australian international and New South Wales State of Origin representative forward, he played club football for the Parramatta Eels with whom he won the 1981 NSWRFL Premiership.

== Playing career ==
Hilditch made his first grade debut for Parramatta in round 6 of the 1975 season against Western Suburbs. In 1976, he played in Parramatta's first ever grand final which was a 13–10 loss to Manly-Warringah. The following year, he played in Parramatta's 1977 Grand Final and Grand Final replay loss against St. George.

In 1981, it was third time lucky for Hilditch as he played in Parramatta's first-ever premiership victory, a 20–11 win over Newtown in the grand final.

An Australian Kangaroo, Hilditch was selected for three internationals, all against France; once in 1978 and twice in 1981.

Hilditch was selected to represent New South Wales as a front-rower for the only State of Origin game in 1981.

Hilditch played in the club's 1982 preliminary final victory over Eastern Suburbs but missed out on selection in the 1982 Grand Final where Parramatta defeated Manly-Warringah.

== Coaching career ==
After three years as captain-coach of Mudgee in the Country Rugby League, Hilditch coached the Illawarra Steelers in 1989 and 1990. In 1994, he succeeded Mick Cronin at Parramatta but his three years as coach of the club were not particularly successful, with only a 30% win rate. Hilditch was replaced by Brian Smith in 1997.

Hilditch was inducted into the Parramatta Eels Hall of Fame in 2006.

Hilditch was a member of the Parramatta Eels Board of Directors.
