= Greg Oliphant =

Australia international rugby league footballer & coach

Personal information
- Born: 22 June 1950 (age 75)

Playing information
- Position: Halfback
Club
Years	Team	Pld	T	G	FG	P
197?–7?	Wests (Brisbane)
197?–78	Redcliffe
1979–80	Balmain Tigers	27	2	0	3	9
	Total	27	2	0	3	9
Representative
Years	Team	Pld	T	G	FG	P
1976–80	Queensland	7	1	0	0	3
1978	Australia	2	0	0	0	0

Coaching information
Club
Years	Team	Gms	W	D	L	W%
1984	Western Suburbs	21	5	0	16	24
1986–88	Northern Suburbs	52	29	2	21	56
	Total	73	34	2	37	47
- Source: As of 2009

Greg Oliphant (born 22 June 1950) is an Australian former professional rugby league footballer, a state and national representative halfback who made one Kangaroo tour. Oliphant played in the New South Wales Rugby League for the two seasons of 1978–1979 with the Balmain Tigers. Prior to and after those years he played in the Brisbane Rugby League with Wests, Valleys and Redcliffe.

He made his international debut off the reserve bench in the first Test of the 1978 domestic series against New Zealand and then started in the 2nd Test. He was selected for the 1978 Kangaroo tour but played only four tour matches with his rival Tommy Raudonikis the selectors' preferred Test halfback. Oliphant and Raudonikis enjoyed a great club and state rivalry and regularly competed for national selection. Oliphant played in the inaugural State of Origin match for the Queensland Maroons. He later coached in the BRL premiership with Norths.
