= Tommy Raudonikis =

Australian rugby league footballer and coach (1950–2021)

Tommy Raudonikis OAM
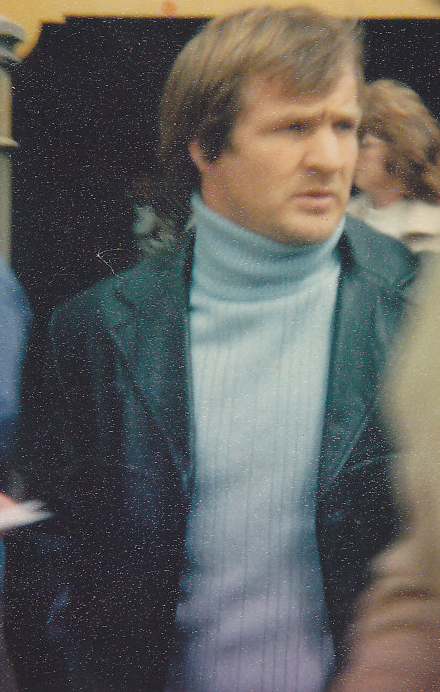
- Raudonikis in c. 1978

Personal information
- Full name: Thomas Walter Raudonikis
- Born: 13 April 1950 Bathurst, New South Wales, Australia
- Died: 7 April 2021 (aged 70) Gold Coast, Queensland, Australia

Playing information
- Height: 170 cm (5 ft 7 in)
- Weight: 11 st 7 lb (73 kg)
- Position: Halfback
Club
Years	Team	Pld	T	G	FG	P
1969–79	Western Suburbs	201	30	0	0	90
1980–82	Newtown	37	4	0	0	16
1983	Past Brothers	6	0	0	0	0
	Total	244	34	0	0	106
Representative
Years	Team	Pld	T	G	FG	P
1971–80	New South Wales	24	11	0	0	33
1971–80	Australia	29	5	0	0	15
1972–80	Sydney City	8	4	0	0	12

Coaching information
Club
Years	Team	Gms	W	D	L	W%
1983–84	Past Brothers	36	14	2	20	39
1986–88	Ipswich Jets	53	25	1	27	47
1990–91	Northern Suburbs	41	25	1	15	61
1995–99	Western Suburbs	114	39	1	74	34
	Total	244	103	5	136	42
Representative
Years	Team	Gms	W	D	L	W%
1997–98	New South Wales	6	3	0	3	50
- Relatives: Lincoln Raudonikis (son)

Thomas Walter Raudonikis OAM (13 April 1950 – 7 April 2021) was an Australian rugby league footballer and coach. He played 40 International games and World Cup games as Australia representative halfback and captained his country in two matches of the 1973 Kangaroo tour.

== Background ==
Raudonikis was born in Bathurst, New South Wales, the son of a Lithuanian immigrant father and a Swiss immigrant mother. He grew up in Cowra. He said, "Mum and Dad migrated over here in 1950. Mum was pregnant with me on the boat, and I was born at the migrant camp."

He joined the Royal Australian Air Force (RAAF) as an engineering apprentice in 1967 and spent three years under training at RAAF Base Wagga.

== Club playing career ==
Raudonikis played 201 games for the Western Suburbs Magpies between 1969 and 1979. Raudonikis quickly established himself of one of the Leagues top players when in 1972 he won the Rothmans Medal, as judged by the NSWRL referees as the best and fairest player in the competition. Led by Raudonikis and the likes of Graeme O'Grady, Les Boyd, John Donnelly the Magpies enjoyed several finals appearances in the late 70's, including winning the 1977 Amco Cup and the Minor Premiership in 1978. Raudonikis epitomised the "Fibros versus Silvertails" rivalry with the Manly-Warringah Sea Eagles stoked by Western Suburbs coach Roy Masters. However, Premiership success eluded the Lidcombe-based club.

Along with fellow Magpies Graeme O'Grady and Steve Blythe, Raudonikis moved from Western Suburbs to the Newtown Jets, playing 37 games in three seasons between 1980 and 1982. He captained the Jets to the 1981 NSWRL Grand Final against Parramatta. He scored a try early in the second half of the match but Newtown would eventually be defeated 20 points to 11.

He moved to Queensland in 1983 where he was captain-coach of the Brothers club in Brisbane.

In September 2004 he was named in the Western Suburbs Magpies team of the century.

Raudonikis was Western Suburbs club captain from 1971 to 1979, and was Newtown club captain from 1980 to 1982.

== Representative playing career ==
Raudonikis was first selected in an Australian squad in 1971 behind Souths halfback Bob Grant and made his run on debut in 1972 against the Kiwis (the same year he won the Rothmans Medal for best club player for the season). He was the regular Test halfback for the next six years. He made Test appearances up until 1980 by which time he was being challenged by Greg Oliphant and Steve Mortimer.

He was the captain of the New South Wales State of Origin team in the inaugural 1980 "Origin" contest. Queensland won 20-10 with Raudonikis, in his one-and-only Origin appearance. Having been knocked out early in the game he would have little impact despite scoring a late try for New South Wales.

- NSW and Australian halfback throughout the 1970s
- Coached NSW Blues in 1997 and 1998 Origin Series
- NSW Sporting Hall of Fame
- Kangaroos captain in 1973 for the deciding Ashes test against Great Britain (won 15–5) and the opening test against France (won 21–9)
- 29 Test and World Cup caps

== Awards ==
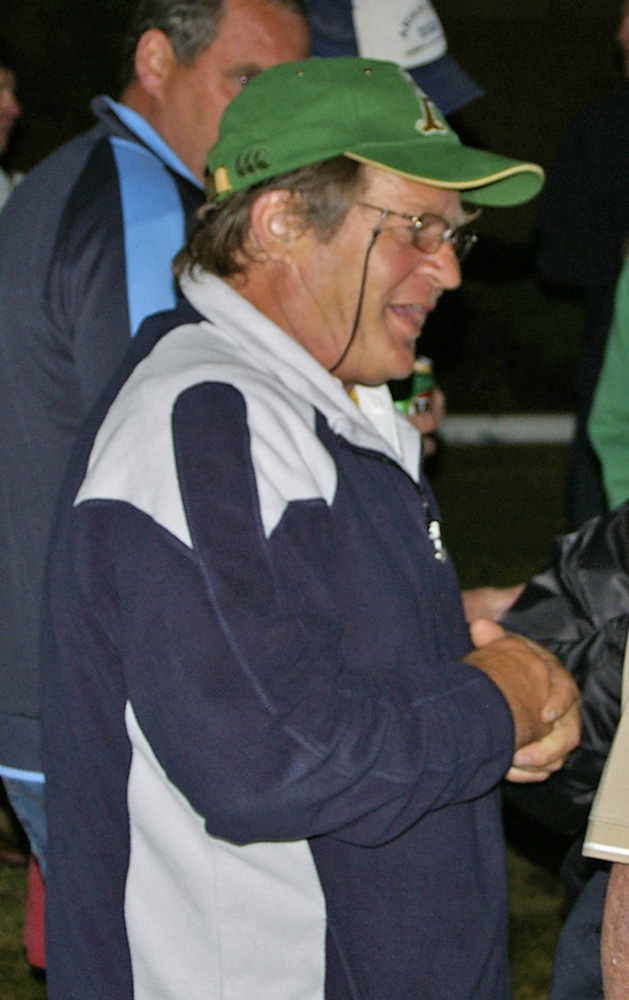
Raudonikis in 2008

- Awarded the Medal of the Order of Australia (OAM) in 1982
- Team of the Century with Wests Tigers and Western Suburbs
- Wests Magpies # 1 club man in 100 years and Magpie Immortal
- Voted Newtown's Greatest Import in 100 years
- Men of League's Toughest 12 in last 50 years
- ARL's greatest 100 in past 100 years
- National Rugby League Hall of Fame (Inductee 75)

== Coaching career ==
Raudonikis' final playing year was in a captain coach role at Brisbane Brothers in 1983. From 1985-88, he coached Ipswich Jets, guiding the Jets to their first Brisbane Rugby League Grand Final appearance in 1988. In 1990, his first season as Brisbane Norths coach, Raudonikis led the club to the 1990 Brisbane Rugby League Grand Final, the Devils just falling short 16-17. Returning to Sydney, he was coach of the Western Suburbs Magpies from 1995 until the formation of the Wests Tigers joint venture with the Balmain Tigers at the end of 1999. He had some initial coaching success making the finals in 1996, but Wests were ultimately unable to build on this and only won six games in their final two seasons.

Raudonikis coached the Blues in the 1997 and 1998 series. In those series he entered State of Origin folklore when he introduced the "cattle dog" call to which NSW players responded by breaking from the scrum with fists flying, resulting in two infamous all-in-brawls.

"'Tom Terrific' is impervious to pain. On and off the field Raudonikis was all heart and hustle. Determination and toughness marked his 20 Tests for Australia and his long career with Wests and Newtown and followed him to coaching in Brisbane and Sydney."

— Roy Masters

== Media career ==
Raudonikis was a long-term friend of 2GB radio station owner John Singleton. Through this friendship, he also participated as a commentator for the Continuous Call Team with Ray Hadley on 2GB.

Raudonikis made an appearance in the 2007 rugby league drama film The Final Winter.

Raudonikis at one stage worked as a part of the Channel 9 rugby league commentary team.

In February 2008, Raudonikis was named in the list of Australia's 100 Greatest Players (1908–2007) which was commissioned by the NRL and ARL to celebrate the code's centenary year in Australia. Also in 2008 the Western Suburbs Magpies celebrated their centenary by inducting six inaugural members, including Raudonikis, into the club's Hall of Fame.

In 2017, Raudonikis was a weekly guest on The Footy Show and had his own segment, "The Raudonikis Report".

== Personal life ==
His son Lincoln Raudonikis played two seasons for the Western Suburbs in the NRL during the late 1990s. In April 2013, Raudonikis's 15-year-old grandson died at a Coffs Harbour hospital following a head knock that occurred during a junior rugby league match.

=== Health and death ===
Raudonikis' hospitalisation in August 2006 for a heart bypass operation received national coverage and drew messages of support from a spectrum of famous former players including Wests icon Arthur Summons (the subject of the NRL trophy with Norm Provan).

Raudonikis was reported to have inoperable cancer in April 2019. Two years later, he died of the disease on the Gold Coast, Queensland, six days short of his 71st birthday.

== Sources ==
- Alan Whiticker & Glen Hudson (2007). The Encyclopedia of Rugby League Players. Wetherill Park, New South Wales: Gary Allen Pty Ltd. ISBN 978-1-877082-93-1.

Sporting positions
Preceded by Bob McCarthy	Captain Australia; 1973	Succeeded by Arthur Beetson
