= Redcliffe Dolphins =

Australian rugby league club

Club information
- Full name: Redcliffe District Rugby League Football Club Inc.
- Nickname(s): Redcliffe Dolphins; Dolphins; Reddy
- Colours: Red; White
- Founded: 27 February 1947; 79 years ago
- Website: redcliffedolphins.com.au

Current details
- Ground: Kayo Stadium (11,500)
- CEO: Grant Cleal
- Coach: Scott Murray
- Manager: Marc Hutchinson
- Captain: Dunamis Lui & Sheldon Pitama
- Competition: Hostplus Cup, Brisbane Rugby League
- 2026 season: 5th
- Current season

Records
- Premierships: 2 (1965, 1994)
- Runners-up: 6 (1973, 1975, 1977, 1981, 1983, 1987)
- Minor premierships: 4 (1977, 1978, 1983, 1994)
- Wooden spoons: 0
- Premierships (2nd grade): 8 (1996, 1997, 2000, 2002, 2003, 2006, 2018, 2026)
- Runners-up (2nd grade): 6 (1999, 2001, 2007, 2012, 2016, 2022)
- Premierships (3rd grade): 9 (1997, 2003, 2010, 2011, 2012, 2014, 2016, 2025, 2026)
- Runners-up (3rd grade): 6 (1996, 2002, 2009, 2013, 2017, 2018)
- Most capped: 270 – Troy Lindsay
- Highest points scorer: 1211 – Liam Georgetown

Redcliffe Dolphins are a rugby league club based in Redcliffe, Queensland, Australia. Founded in 1947, they were accepted into the Brisbane Rugby League (BRL) premiership competition in 1960, and since 1996 have played in the Queensland Cup.

The BRL reached its competitive and attendance peak in the 1980s and then began to decline in favour of an expanded NSWRFL Winfield Cup competition. In 1988, the Brisbane Broncos, featuring many BRL players, began competing in the NSWRL, overshadowing the BRL. A new Queensland Cup competition began in 1996, in which the Redcliffe Dolphins were inaugural runners-up. In 1997, the Dolphins won both the final BRL competition and the Queensland Cup.

Since 2023, a separately licensed team, simply called the Dolphins, has competed in the National Rugby League. The NRL team shares ownership, players and facilities with the Queensland Cup side, but with differing colours, names and logos. The name "Redcliffe Dolphins" is reserved for the Queensland Cup side.

Through their NRL license, the Dolphins organisation has become the only former BRL club to regain top-flight status.

== History ==
Founded on 27 February 1947, Redcliffe District Rugby League Football Club Inc. (known as Shellgrit) entered Under 17, Reserve Grade and First Grade teams in that year's Sandgate Suburban Rugby League competition. Through the 1950s, Redcliffe also played in the Kilcoy, Murrumba and Geraghty Cup competitions. On 19 November 1959, Redcliffe received full district club status and was accepted into the Brisbane first grade competition.

Throughout the 1960s, a number of famous players came through the ranks of the Dolphins to represent Queensland and Australia, including Trevor Harken and Arthur Beetson. In 1965, Redcliffe won its first Brisbane Rugby League Premiership. In 1972, Redcliffe were coached by former Kangaroo Ken Day. Redcliffe's halfback Greg Oliphant was selected to go on the 1978 Kangaroo tour but did not play in any Test matches. Australian national coach Frank Stanton coached Redcliffe in 1980. The Redcliffe club won further premierships in 1994, 1996 and 1997 and has also appeared in 12 Queensland Cup grand finals, making it the most successful team in that competition.

The logo of the Redcliffe Dolphins from the early 2000s (decade) to 2005

In 2004, a Gold Coast NRL team was proposed under the name of Gold Coast Dolphins. In response to the threat of legal action from Redcliffe the team entered the NRL in 2007 as the Gold Coast Titans.

Redcliffe defeated Toowoomba in the 2006 Queensland Cup grand final at Suncorp Stadium under the coaching of Anthony Griffin. In 2018, Redcliffe won their sixth Queensland Cup title, defeating Easts Tigers 36-22.

Des Webb served as president and chairman of the club. In 2012, a bronze bust of Webb, crafted by artist Jody Pawley, was unveiled at Redcliffe Leagues Club.

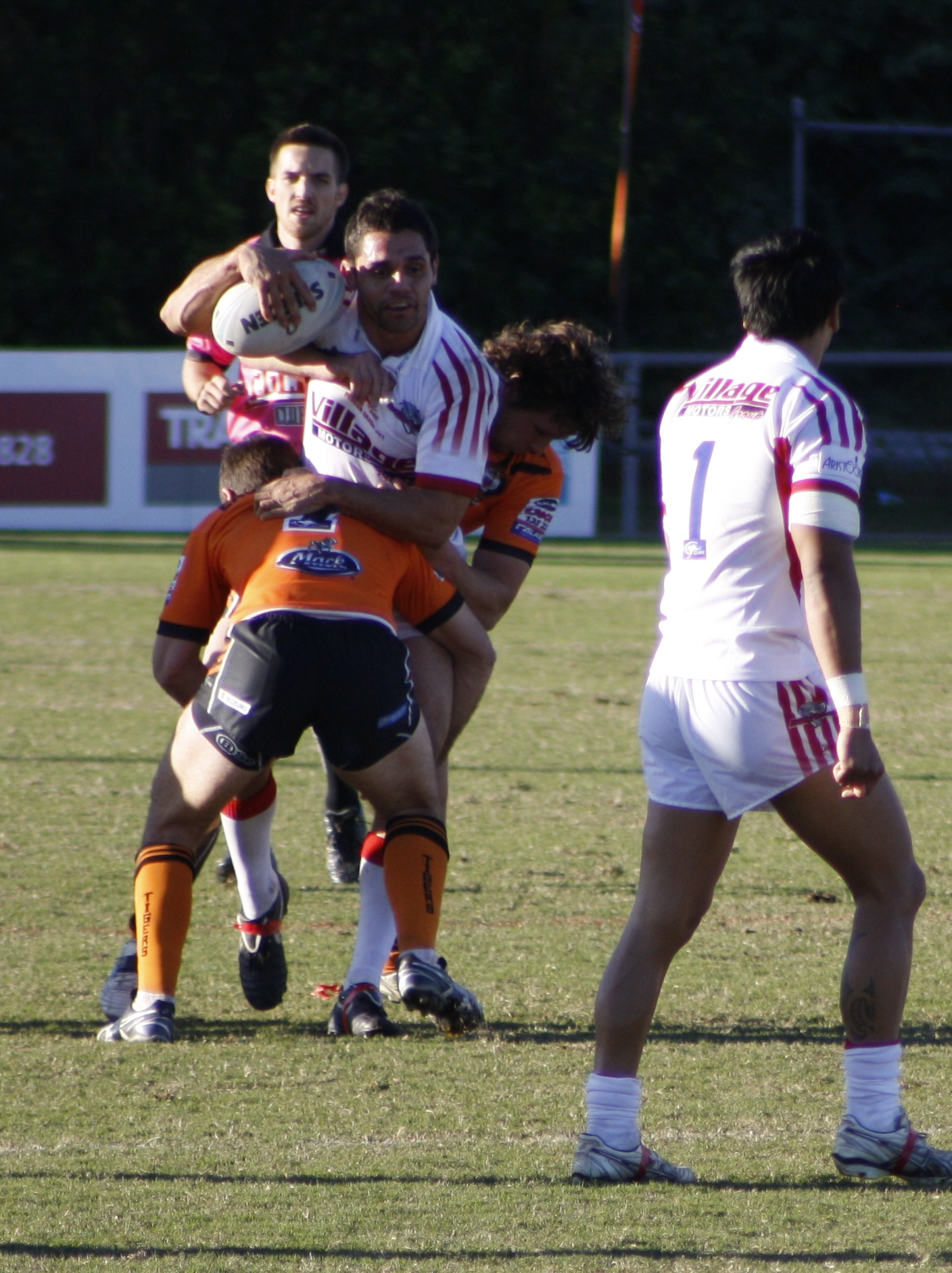
Redcliffe Dolphins tackled by Easts at Langlands Park in 2011.

== NRL Team ==
From 2023 onwards, the Redcliffe Dolphins' separately licensed NRL team, known simply as the Dolphins, have competed in the National Rugby League. The Redcliffe Dolphins continue to compete as they are in the Queensland Cup and other Queensland rugby league competitions.

== Home ground ==
Redcliffe's current home ground, Kayo Stadium, formerly known as Moreton Daily Stadium and Dolphin Oval, was first opened in 1979. After multiple upgrades between 2016 and 2020, the stadium has an approximate capacity of 11,500 including 10,000 seats.

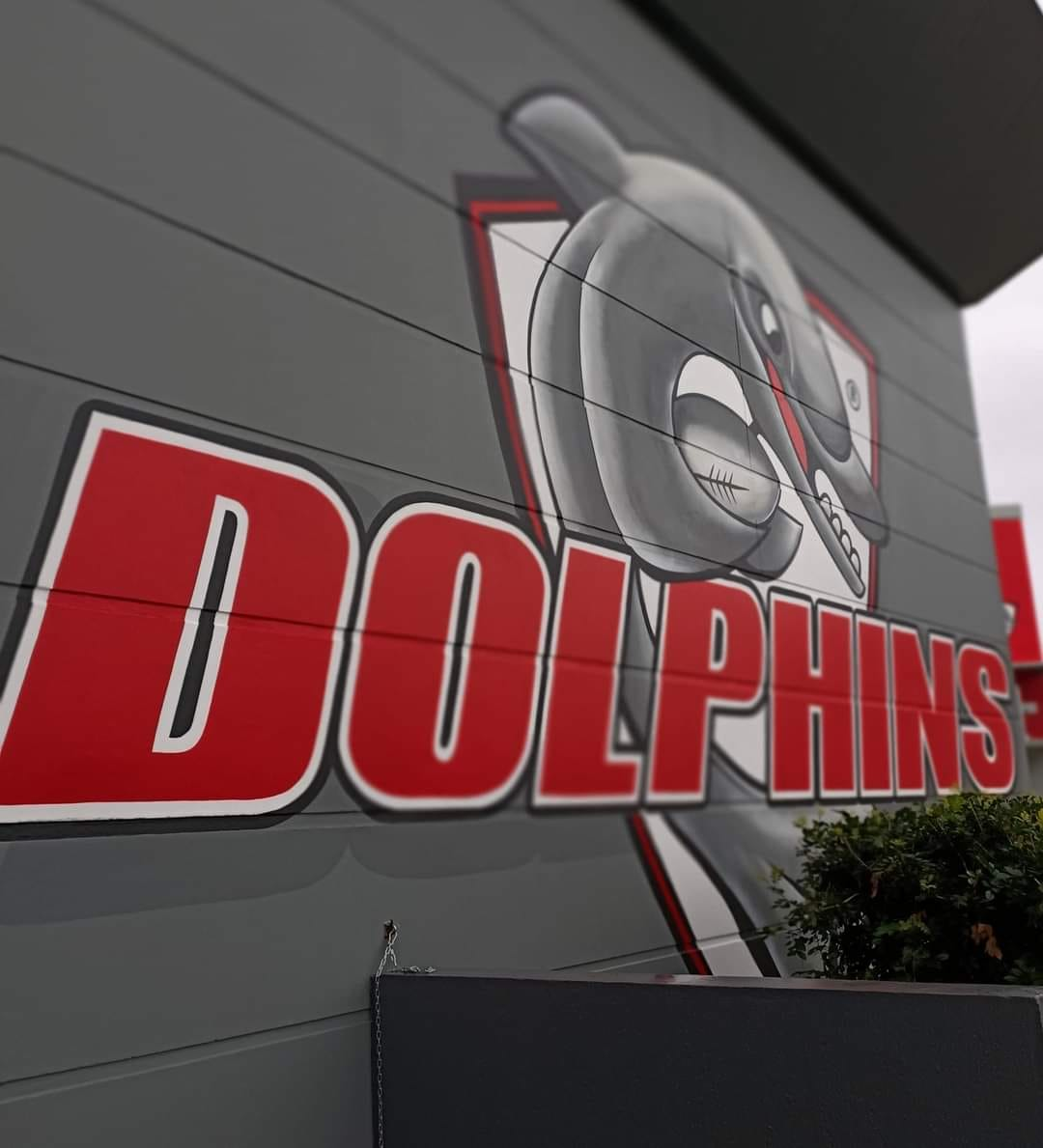
Leagues Club wall

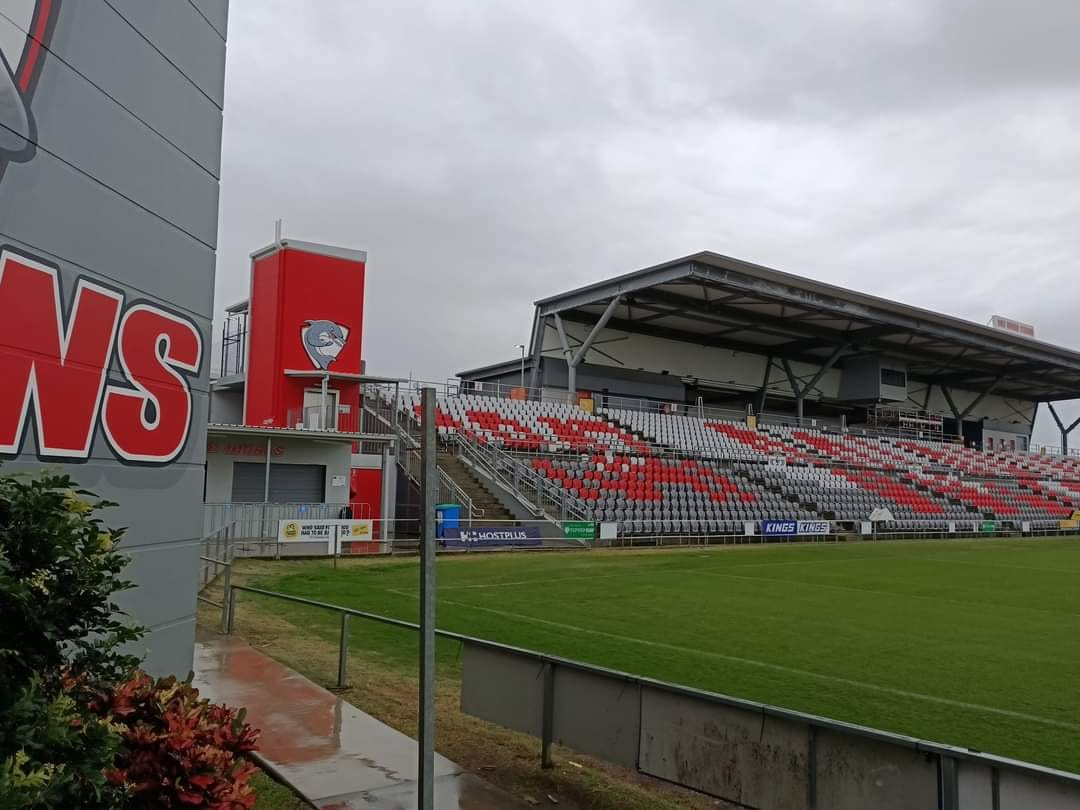
Kayo Stadium

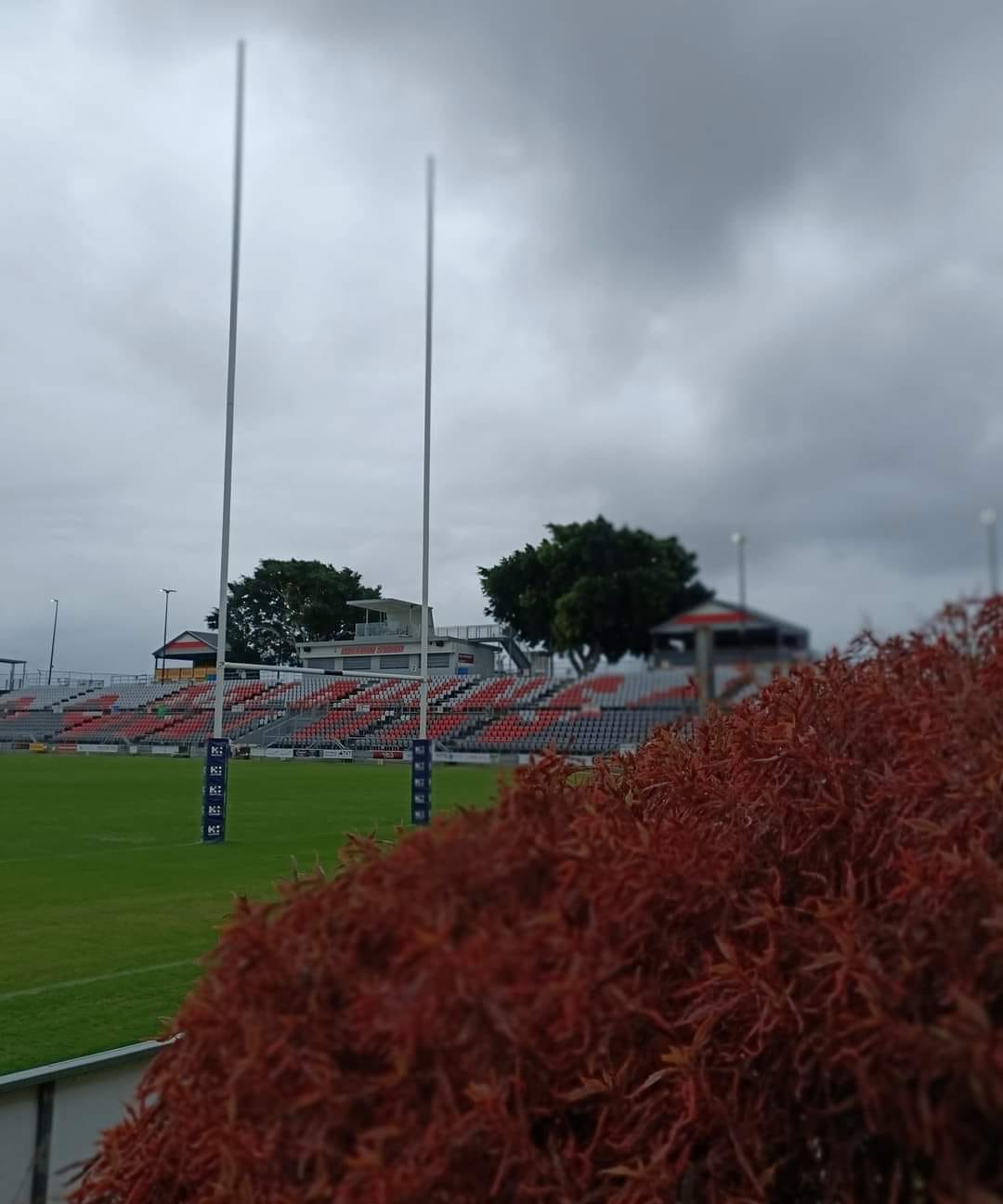
Stadium goal posts

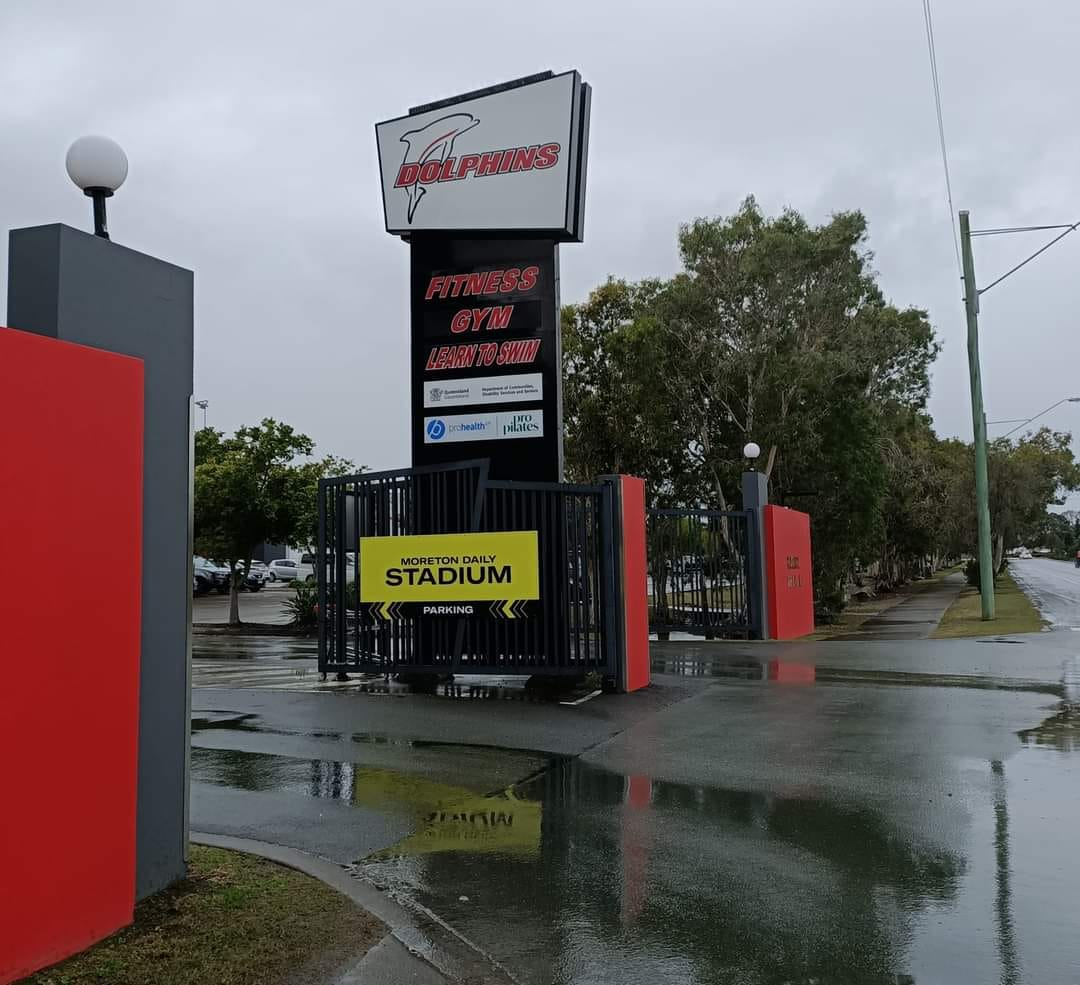
Moreton Daily signage (now Kayo Stadium)

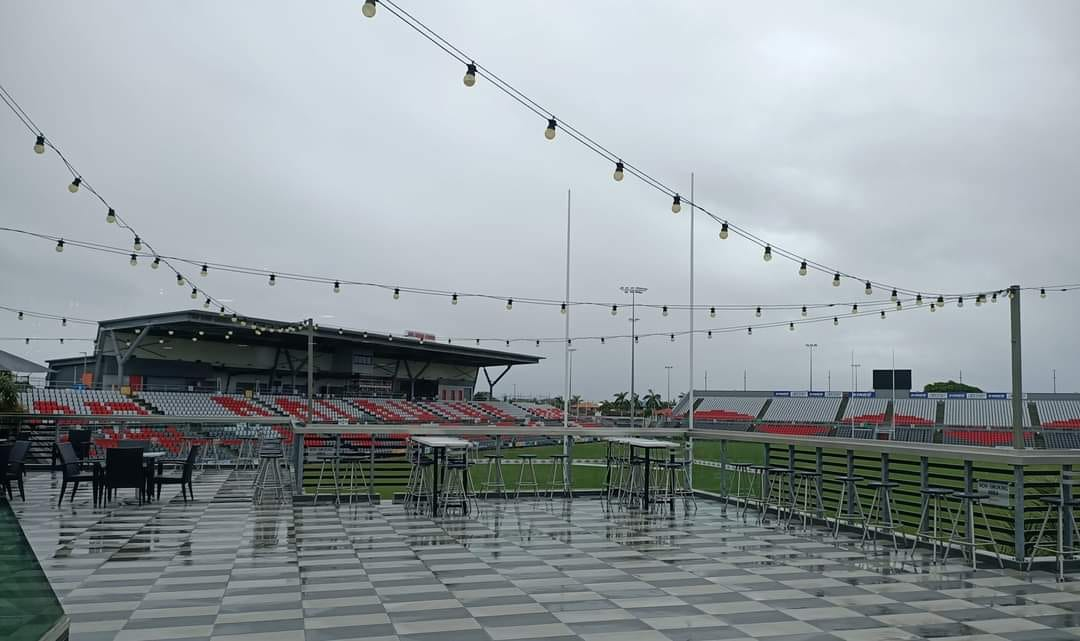
Stadium view from club

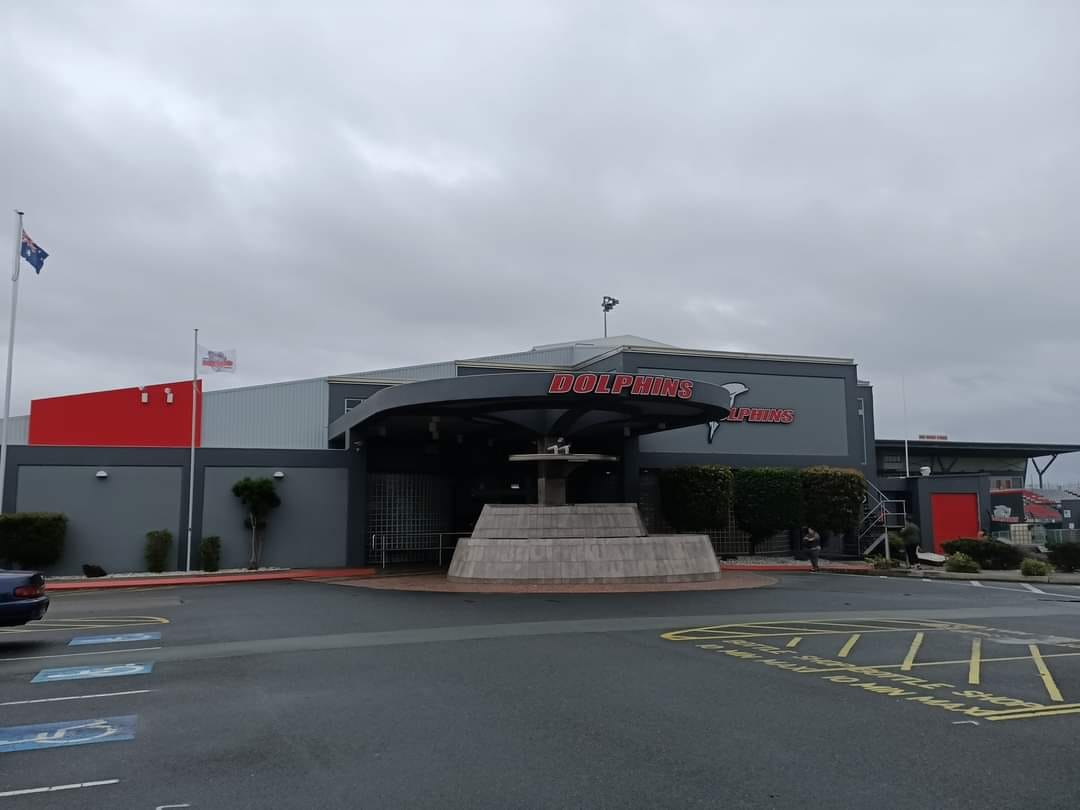
Redcliffe Leagues Club

== Queensland Cup results ==
- 1996: Runners-up
- 1997: Premiers
- 1998: Preliminary finalists
- 1999: Runners-up
- 2000: Premiers
- 2001: Runners-up
- 2002: Premiers
- 2003: Premiers
- 2004: 6th
- 2005: Preliminary finalists
- 2006: Premiers
- 2007: Runners-up
- 2008: Semi Finalists
- 2009: 11th
- 2010: 8th
- 2011: Preliminary Finals
- 2012: Runners-up
- 2013: 8th
- 2014: 11th
- 2015: 7th
- 2016: Runners-up
- 2017: 2nd
- 2018: Premiers
- 2019: 7th
- 2020: Cancelled due to COVID-19 Pandemic
- 2021: 5th
- 2022: Runners-up
- 2023: 5th
- 2024: Runners-up
- 2025: 6th
- 2026: Premiers

== Notable players ==
- Arthur Beetson
- Petero Civoniceva
- Chris Close
- Greg Conescu
- Michael Crocker
- Wally Fullerton-Smith
- Dane Gagai
- Henry Holloway
- Adam Lawton
- Adam Mogg
- Bryan Niebling
- Greg Oliphant
- Shane Perry
- John Ribot
- Brent Tate
- Kevin Yow Yeh
- Felise Kaufusi
- Jarrod Wallace
- Kotoni Staggs

== See also ==
- National Rugby League reserves affiliations

== Sources ==
- Redcliffe Dolphins Statistics (archived). Originally retrieved 7 December 2005
