= List of Canberra Raiders players =

The following is a list of rugby league players who have appeared for Canberra Raiders since the club's first league game in 1982.

Notes:

- Name:
  - Players are listed in the order of their debut game with the club.
  - Players that debuted in the same game are added alphabetically.
- Appearances: Canberra Raiders games only, not a total of their career games. E.g. Luke Priddis has played a career total of 315 first-grade games but of those, 44 were at the Raiders.
- The statistics in this table are correct as of the end of the 2026 NRL season.

== Players ==
Club									Representative	
No.	Name	Debut	Final Yr	Appearances	Tries	Goals	Field goals	Points	Country	State
1	Les McIntyre (Note: Capped as a "Founding Father")									
2	David Grant	1982	1985	79	9	0	0	32	—	—
3	Gerry de la Cruz	1982	1982	4	1	0	0	3	—	—
4	Carl Frommel	1982	1982	25	0	0	0	0	—	—
5	Jon Hardy	1982	1985	54	0	0	0	0	—	—
6	Jay Hoffman	1982	1987	111	9	0	0	35	—	QLD
7	Lloyd Martin	1982	1984	26	2	0	0	6	—	—
8	Peter McGrath	1982	1982	15	1	19	0	41	—	—
9	John McLeod	1982	1984	51	3	0	0	10	—	—
10	Steve O'Callaghan	1982	1987	53	7	11	0	49	—	—
11	Chris O'Grady	1982	1982	14	5	0	0	15	—	—
12	Frank Roddy	1982	1983	20	3	0	0	10	—	—
13	Jeff Simons	1982	1983	16	0	0	0	0	—	—
14	Samuela Vucago	1982	1982	5	0	0	0	0	—	—
15	Scott Dudman	1982	1983	17	2	4	0	14	—	—
16	Mick Tilse	1982	1982	9	0	0	0	0	—	—
17	Richard Cooke	1982	1982	16	0	0	0	0	—	—
18	Paul West	1982	1982	9	0	8	0	16	—	—
19	Ian Hamilton	1982	1985	25	2	0	0	7	—	—
20	Alan Smith	1982	1983	14	2	0	0	6	—	QLD
21	Terry Wickey	1982	1982	9	0	0	0	0	—	—
22	David Reid	1982	1982	12	1	0	0	3	—	—
23	Bruce Bacchetto	1982	1982	1	0	0	0	0	—	—
24	Chris O'Sullivan	1982	1992	204	62	13	10	273	—	—
25	Wayne Stonham	1982	1982	7	0	0	0	0	—	—
26	Craig Bellamy	1982	1992	148	46	0	0	175	—	—
27	Rowan Brennan	1982	1987	46	3	0	0	11	—	—
28	Gary Britt	1982	1984	16	2	9	0	24	—	—
29	Peter Elliott	1982	1982	1	0	0	0	0	—	—
30	Graham Waugh	1982	1984	8	0	0	0	0	—	—
31	Angel Marina	1982	1985	22	10	1	0	34	—	—
32	Ashley Gilbert	1982	1990	135	41	0	0	163	—	—
33	John Algate	1982	1982	1	0	0	0	0	—	—
34	Lui Bon	1982	1982	1	0	0	0	0	—	—
35	Col Brinkley	1982	1982	1	0	0	0	0	—	—
36	Ray Blacklock	1983	1984	29	8	0	0	32	—	—
37	Terry Fahey	1983	1987	54	28	0	0	112	AUS	NSW
38	Ron Giteau	1983	1986	78	14	234	3	527	—	—
39	Percy Knight	1983	1985	24	4	0	0	16	—	—
40	Allan McMahon	1983	1983	18	5	0	0	20	—	—
41	Gary Spears	1983	1986	45	2	0	0	8	—	—
42	Mark Brennan	1983	1984	15	0	0	0	0	—	—
43	Sam Backo	1983	1988	115	15	0	0	60	AUS	QLD
44	Steve Keir	1983	1984	12	0	0	0	0	—	—
45	Paul Elliott	1983	1987	75	5	0	1	21	—	—
46	Gary Wurth	1983	1983	6	1	0	0	4	—	—
47	Grant Ellis	1983	1988	52	2	0	0	8	—	—
48	Wayne Jensen	1983	1985	3	0	0	0	0	—	—
49	Chris Kinna	1983	1989	52	13	0	0	52	—	—
50	David Newham	1983	1983	1	0	0	0	0	—	—
51	Dean Lance	1984	1990	160	2	0	0	8	—	—
52	Bill Walker	1984	1985	25	7	0	0	28	—	—
53	Jamie Jones	1984	1984	1	0	0	0	0	—	—
54	Ron Sigsworth	1984	1984	13	3	0	0	12	—	—
55	Ivan Henjak	1984	1989	118	29	0	0	116	—	—
56	Nigel Wilson	1984	1984	8	1	0	0	4	—	—
57	Matthew Corkery	1984	1989	56	19	5	0	86	—	—
58	Mick Aldous	1984	1985	25	9	0	0	36	—	—
59	Robert Dunning	1984	1985	3	0	0	0	0	—	—
60	Brett Atkins	1985	1991	25	3	0	0	12	—	—
61	Phil Carey	1985	1991	87	21	6	0	96	—	—
62	Peter Davis	1985	1985	11	2	0	0	8	—	—
63	Terry Regan	1985	1987	32	4	0	0	16	—	—
64	Michael Blake	1985	1986	10	2	0	0	8	—	—
65	Paul Thompson	1985	1985	3	0	0	0	0	—	—
66	Brad Williams	1985	1985	14	3	0	0	12	—	—
67	Kevin Beardmore	1985	1985	4	0	0	0	0	GBR	—
68	Darren Waters	1985	1985	3	1	0	0	4	—	—
69	Mike Smith	1985	1985	4	0	0	0	0	—	—
70	Les Morrissey	1985	1987	19	1	0	0	4	—	—
71	Jamie McInnes	1985	1988	2	0	0	0	0	—	—
72	Garry Wilson	1985	1985	1	0	0	0	0	—	—
73	Gary Belcher	1986	1993	148	69	148	0	572	AUS	QLD
74	Gary Coyne	1986	1992	158	28	0	0	112	AUS	QLD
75	John Ferguson	1986	1990	94	50	0	0	200	AUS	NSW
76	Mal Meninga	1986	1994	166	74	283	2	864	AUS	QLD
77	Darren Meredith	1986	1986	7	0	0	0	0	—	—
78	Steve Walters	1986	1996	228	41	0	0	164	AUS	QLD
79	Paul Martin	1986	1991	86	28	0	0	112	—	—
80	Mitch Brennan	1986	1988	8	0	0	0	0	—	—
81	Alfie Walker	1986	1987	4	0	0	0	0	—	—
82	Paul Young	1986	1987	4	1	0	0	4	—	—
83	Jim Antonakos	1986	1986	1	0	0	0	0	—	—
84	Peter Jackson	1987	1988	42	15	6	0	72	AUS	QLD
85	Brent Todd	1987	1991	91	0	0	0	0	NZL	—
86	Kevin Walters	1987	1989	46	9	0	0	36	AUS	QLD
87	David Paterson	1987	1987	1	0	0	0	0	—	—
88	Laurie Daley	1987	2000	244	87	44	9	445	AUS	NSW
89	Steve Jackson	1987	1989	17	4	0	0	16	—	QLD
90	Glenn Lazarus	1987	1991	92	10	0	0	40	AUS	NSW
91	Tim Wilby	1987	1987	1	0	0	0	0	—	—
92	Brian Battese	1988	1988	2	0	0	0	0	—	—
93	Wayne Collins	1988	1990	31	1	0	0	4	—	—
94	Dean Lonergan	1988	1988	4	0	0	0	0	NZL	—
95	Chris Houghton	1988	1989	17	0	0	0	0	—	—
96	Robbie Collins	1988	1988	1	0	0	0	0	—	—
97	Bradley Clyde	1988	1998	178	38	0	0	152	AUS	NSW
98	Ricky Stuart	1988	1998	203	39	7	25	195	AUS	NSW
99	Phil Hurst	1988	1988	3	1	0	0	4	—	—
100	Mark Bell	1988	1991	50	15	3	0	66	—	—
101	Ron Coskerie	1988	1989	2	0	0	0	0	—	—
102	Craig Dimond	1989	1989	14	1	0	0	4	—	—
103	Matthew Wood	1989	1996	75	23	38	0	168	—	—
104	Perry Smith	1989	1989	2	0	0	0	0	—	—
105	Mark Lowry	1989	1993	28	1	0	0	4	—	—
106	Darren Fritz	1989	1993	53	3	0	0	12	—	QLD
107	Paul Beath	1989	1990	4	1	0	0	4	—	—
108	Michael Twigg	1989	1991	14	0	0	0	0	—	—
109	Nigel Gaffey	1989	1991	23	3	0	0	12	—	—
110	Andrew Halley	1989	1989	2	1	0	0	4	—	—
111	David Barnhill	1989	1991	40	1	0	0	4	—	NSW
112	Stephen Mills	1989	1990	4	0	0	0	0	—	—
113	Stuart Stanton	1989	1991	18	0	0	0	0	—	—
114	Roger Kenworthy	1989	1996	15	0	0	0	0	—	—
115	Dave Woods	1990	1993	24	2	0	0	8	—	—
116	Steve Stone	1990	1996	65	7	0	0	28	—	—
117	Craig Breen	1990	1991	2	1	0	0	4	—	—
118	Brett Mullins	1990	2000	183	105	0	0	420	AUS	NSW
119	Scott Gale	1991	1992	20	3	1	0	14	—	—
120	Glenn Ryan	1991	1991	3	0	0	0	0	—	—
121	Darrell McDonald	1991	1992	28	7	0	0	28	—	—
122	Jason Death	1991	1995	57	6	0	0	24	—	—
123	Brett Boyd	1991	1991	13	1	0	0	4	—	—
124	Jason Croker	1991	2006	318	120	1	0	482	AUS	NSW
125	David Boyle	1991	1998	117	35	2	0	144	—	—
126	Matthew Baker	1991	1991	5	0	0	0	0	—	—
127	Jason Gregory	1991	1991	8	0	0	0	0	—	—
128	Alex Corvo	1991	1991	5	0	0	0	0	—	—
129	Paul Jones	1991	1991	1	0	0	0	0	—	—
130	Michael Harrison	1992	1992	3	0	0	0	0	—	—
131	Sean Hoppe	1992	1993	39	22	0	0	88	NZL	—
132	Paul Osborne	1992	1994	51	4	0	0	16	—	—
133	Phil Blake	1992	1992	16	5	0	1	21	—	NSW
134	Brett Hetherington	1992	1998	119	4	0	0	16	—	—
135	David Furner	1992	2000	200	49	511	0	1218	AUS	NSW
136	Shawn Rubesaame	1992	1992	7	0	0	0	0	—	—
137	Brad Mansfield	1992	1992	2	0	0	0	0	—	—
138	David Gray	1992	1992	1	0	0	0	0	—	—
139	Kris Tassell	1992	1992	2	0	0	0	0	—	—
140	James Hunt	1992	1992	1	0	0	0	0	—	—
141	Glenn Cannon	1992	1992	2	0	0	0	0	—	—
142	Brad Foster	1992	1992	1	0	0	0	0	—	—
143	Brendan Norton	1992	1992	2	0	0	0	0	—	—
144	Michael Maguire	1992	1998	11	4	0	0	16	—	—
145	Ian Graham	1992	1992	1	0	0	0	0	—	—
146	Ken Nagas	1992	2002	142	59	1	0	238	—	NSW
147	Michael Spinks	1992	1992	1	0	0	0	0	—	—
148	John Lomax	1993	1996	65	3	1	0	14	NZL	—
149	Quentin Pongia	1993	1997	74	3	0	0	12	NZL	—
150	Mark Corvo	1993	2000	50	1	1	0	6	—	—
151	Noa Nadruku	1993	1997	92	73	0	0	292	FIJ	—
152	Jimmy Veikoso	1993	1994	4	0	0	0	0	TON	—
153	Ruben Wiki	1993	2004	224	60	0	0	240	NZL	—
154	Albert Fulivai	1993	1998	44	22	0	0	88	—	—
155	Trevor Schodel	1993	1993	4	1	0	0	4	—	—
156	David Westley	1993	1999	98	7	0	0	28	PNG	—
157	Steve Trindall	1993	1995	5	0	0	0	0	—	—
158	Peter Benson	1994	1994	2	0	0	0	0	—	—
159	Bruce Mamando	1994	1996	14	3	0	0	12	PNG	—
160	Ric Emmanuel	1994	1994	1	0	0	0	0	—	—
161	David Lomax	1994	1995	4	0	0	0	0	NZL	—
162	Jason Burnham	1994	2000	58	2	0	0	8	—	—
163	Luke Davico	1994	2004	176	16	0	0	64	—	—
164	Martin-John Kelly	1994	1994	1	0	0	0	0	—	—
165	Simon Woolford	1994	2006	233	35	1	0	142	—	—
166	Graham Appo	1994	1998	20	7	3	0	34	PNG	—
167	Salesi Finau	1994	1994	1	0	0	0	0	TON	—
168	David Cox	1995	1999	13	1	0	0	4	—	—
169	Shaun Mahoney	1995	1995	2	0	0	0	0	—	—
170	Ben Kennedy	1996	1999	67	31	0	0	124	AUS	NSW
171	Jamie Kennedy	1996	1996	1	0	0	0	0	—	—
172	Jason Ferris	1996	1996	13	1	8	0	20	—	—
173	Adam Peters	1996	2001	17	1	0	0	4	—	—
174	Bert Tabuai	1996	1996	2	0	0	0	0	—	—
175	Daniel Baker	1996	1996	1	0	0	0	0	—	—
176	Luke Phillips	1996	1996	1	0	2	0	4	—	—
177	Jeremy Robinson	1996	1996	1	0	1	0	2	—	—
178	Steve Collins	1996	1996	11	4	0	0	16	—	—
179	Royston Lightning	1996	1998	15	5	11	0	42	—	—
180	Todd Payten	1996	2002	90	9	0	0	36	—	—
181	Damon Booby	1997	1997	2	2	0	0	8	—	—
182	Matt Gafa	1997	2005	42	13	51	0	154	—	—
183	Luke Priddis	1997	1998	44	11	0	0	44	—	NSW
184	Geoff McNamara	1997	1998	25	8	3	0	38	—	—
185	Craig O'Neall	1997	1997	5	1	3	0	10	—	—
186	Barry Lea	1997	1997	1	0	0	0	0	—	—
187	David Atkins	1997	2000	30	1	0	0	4	—	—
188	Darren Shaw	1997	1997	2	0	0	0	0	SCO	—
189	Tim van Dalen	1997	1997	2	0	0	0	0	—	—
190	Andrew McFadden	1997	2001	76	28	1	1	115	—	—
191	Ben Rauter	1997	1998	4	0	0	0	0	—	—
192	Brandon Costin	1998	2000	60	18	6	0	84	—	—
193	Nathan Sologinkin	1998	1999	13	0	0	0	0	—	—
194	Anthony Seibold	1998	1998	14	0	0	0	0	—	—
195	Mark McLinden	1998	2004	165	65	0	1	261	—	—
196	Lesley Vainikolo	1998	2001	69	35	0	0	140	NZL	—
197	Anthony Brann	1998	2000	39	1	0	0	4	—	—
198	Danny Lima	1998	1998	2	0	0	0	0	SAM	—
199	Rod Jensen	1999	2003	28	9	0	0	36	—	—
200	Damian Kennedy	1999	2000	14	4	0	0	16	—	—
201	Rod Maybon	1999	1999	9	3	0	0	12	—	—
202	Luke Williamson	1999	2001	41	8	113	3	261	—	—
203	Jérôme Guisset	1999	1999	4	0	0	0	0	FRA	—
204	David Schrader	1999	1999	7	2	0	0	8	—	—
205	Brett Finch	1999	2002	70	22	0	2	90	—	NSW
206	Brad Kelly	1999	2001	18	2	0	0	8	—	—
207	Anthony Colella	2000	2001	28	11	0	0	44	—	—
208	Anthony Swann	2000	2001	19	6	0	0	24	NZL→SAM	—
209	Nathan Barnes	2000	2000	1	0	0	0	0	—	—
210	Justin Morgan	2000	2000	22	0	0	0	0	WAL	—
211	Alan Tongue	2000	2011	220	31	0	1	125	—	—
212	Greg Wolfgramm	2000	2002	29	6	0	0	24	TON	—
213	Terry Martin	2000	2006	92	9	0	0	36	—	—
214	Lincoln Withers	2000	2008	83	22	0	0	88	—	—
215	Jamahl Lolesi	2000	2003	68	32	0	0	128	NZL	—
216	Sean Rutgerson	2000	2003	56	1	0	0	4	—	—
217	Shane Kelly	2000	2001	11	3	0	0	12	—	—
218	Sione Faumuina	2001	2001	11	2	0	0	8	NZL	—
219	Clinton Schifcofske	2001	2006	139	44	432	12	1052	—	QLD
220	Darren Mapp	2001	2002	26	4	0	0	16	—	—
221	Ryan O'Hara	2001	2005	95	7	0	0	28	—	NSW
222	Michael Hodgson	2001	2006	98	8	0	0	32	—	—
223	Odell Manuel	2001	2002	19	6	0	0	24	—	—
224	Joel Monaghan	2001	2010	129	69	6	0	288	AUS	NSW
225	Darren Porter	2001	2004	15	0	0	0	0	—	—
226	Michael Monaghan	2001	2003	31	7	0	1	29	—	—
227	Jarred Lawrence	2001	2004	4	0	0	0	0	—	—
228	Michael Robertson	2001	2005	59	15	0	0	60	SCO	—
229	Troy Thompson	2001	2010	156	6	0	0	24	—	—
230	James Evans	2001	2004	16	4	0	0	16	—	—
231	Tyran Smith	2002	2005	57	5	0	0	20	NZL	—
232	Phil Graham	2002	2009	111	68	10	0	292	—	—
233	Mark Bryant	2002	2004	7	0	0	0	0	—	—
234	James Buser	2002	2002	2	1	0	0	4	—	—
235	Mark Asbock	2002	2002	3	2	0	0	8	—	—
236	Brad Drew	2003	2004	38	5	1	4	26	—	—
237	Ian Hindmarsh	2003	2005	67	5	0	0	20	—	—
238	Adam Mogg	2003	2010	96	38	0	0	152	—	QLD
239	Jason Bulgarelli	2003	2004	27	6	0	0	24	—	—
240	Michael Weyman	2003	2008	47	3	0	0	12	AUS	NSW
241	Ben Cross	2003	2005	24	0	0	0	0	—	—
242	Terry Campese	2004	2014	139	24	124	1	345	AUS→ITA	NSW
243	Josh Miller	2004	2011	113	3	0	0	12	—	—
244	Alan Rothery	2004	2007	25	0	0	0	0	—	—
245	Kris Kahler	2004	2006	35	1	0	0	4	—	—
246	Todd Carney	2004	2008	71	29	70	6	262	AUS	NSW
247	Nathan Smith	2004	2004	7	7	0	0	28	—	—
248	Marshall Chalk	2004	2008	71	23	0	0	92	—	—
249	Matt Adamson	2005	2005	16	4	0	0	16	—	NSW
250	Craig Frawley	2005	2006	23	3	0	0	12	—	—
251	David Howell	2005	2007	48	15	0	0	60	—	—
252	Jason Smith	2005	2006	38	9	0	1	37	AUS	QLD
253	Andrew Lomu	2005	2006	15	0	0	0	0	TON→NZL	—
254	Jermaine Ale	2005	2005	4	1	0	0	4	—	—
255	Jason Williams	2005	2006	16	1	0	0	4	—	—
256	David Milne	2005	2011	50	23	0	0	92	—	—
257	Ben Jones	2006	2008	33	2	0	0	8	—	—
258	Adrian Purtell	2006	2009	64	30	0	0	120	—	—
259	Willie Raston	2006	2006	3	0	0	0	0	—	—
260	Tom Learoyd-Lahrs	2006	2013	109	8	0	0	32	AUS	NSW
261	William Zillman	2006	2008	24	12	0	0	48	—	—
262	Trevor Thurling	2006	2012	99	13	0	0	52	—	—
263	Dane Tilse	2006	2015	201	12	0	0	48	—	—
264	Colin Best	2007	2008	44	18	0	0	72	—	—
265	Michael Dobson	2007	2008	20	3	56	0	124	—	—
266	Glen Turner	2007	2009	36	5	0	0	20	—	—
267	Neville Costigan	2007	2008	25	5	0	0	20	PNG	QLD
268	Andrew Dunemann	2007	2007	2	0	0	0	0	—	—
269	Scott Logan	2007	2010	74	7	0	0	28	SCO	—
270	Joe Picker	2007	2013	110	20	0	0	80	—	—
271	Brett Kelly	2007	2010	20	8	0	0	32	—	—
272	Ryan Hinchcliffe	2007	2008	21	3	0	0	12	—	—
273	Bronx Goodwin	2007	2008	23	7	0	0	28	—	—
274	Brad Cross	2007	2007	3	2	0	0	8	—	—
275	Nigel Plum	2007	2009	33	3	0	0	12	—	—
276	Matt Bickerstaff	2007	2007	2	1	0	0	4	—	—
277	Glen Buttriss	2008	2015	119	7	0	0	28	—	—
278	Justin Carney	2008	2009	20	12	0	0	48	—	—
279	Marc Herbert	2008	2010	23	2	6	1	21	—	—
280	Joel Thompson	2008	2013	89	28	0	0	112	—	—
281	Bronson Harrison	2009	2012	83	11	0	0	44	NZL	—
282	David Shillington	2009	2015	131	5	0	0	20	AUS	QLD
283	Stuart Flanagan	2009	2009	4	1	0	0	4	—	—
284	Jarrod Croker	2009	2023	307	136	915	0	2374	—	—
285	Travis Waddell	2009	2012	53	3	0	0	12	—	—
286	Josh Dugan	2009	2013	70	26	7	1	119	AUS	NSW
287	Shaun Fensom	2009	2017	139	16	0	0	64	—	—
288	Josh McCrone	2009	2015	133	34	0	1	137	—	—
289	Daniel Vidot	2009	2011	45	27	0	0	108	SAM	—
290	Danny Galea	2010	2011	20	0	0	0	0	—	—
291	Reece Robinson	2010	2014	83	44	3	0	182	LEB	—
292	James Stuart	2010	2011	7	0	0	0	0	—	—
293	Drury Low	2010	2010	2	3	0	0	12	COK	—
294	Sam Mataora	2010	2013	33	2	0	0	8	COK	—
295	Blake Ferguson	2011	2013	60	36	14	0	172	AUS	NSW
296	Sam Williams	2011	2021	103	20	45	6	176	—	—
297	Brett White	2011	2014	69	0	0	0	0	AUS→IRE	NSW
298	Matt Orford	2011	2011	6	0	0	0	0	—	—
299	Nathan Massey	2011	2011	6	1	0	0	4	SCO	—
300	Josh Papali'i	2011	2026	342	68	1	0	274	AUS→SAM	QLD
301	Michael Picker	2011	2011	4	1	0	0	4	—	—
302	Shaun Berrigan	2012	2013	36	3	0	0	12	AUS	QLD
303	Jack Wighton	2012	2023	242	75	0	0	300	AUS	NSW
304	Jarrad Kennedy	2012	2015	49	5	0	0	20	—	—
305	Matt McIlwrick	2012	2014	19	1	0	0	4	—	—
306	Edrick Lee	2012	2016	67	33	0	0	132	—	—
307	Dimitri Pelo	2012	2012	5	0	0	0	0	FRA	—
308	Sandor Earl	2012	2013	29	17	0	0	68	—	—
309	Mark Nicholls	2012	2015	19	1	0	0	4	—	—
310	Joel Edwards	2013	2014	43	3	0	0	12	—	—
311	Anthony Milford	2013	2014	42	21	3	2	92	SAM	QLD
312	Jake Foster	2013	2014	5	0	0	0	0	—	—
313	Paul Vaughan	2013	2016	85	16	0	0	64	ITA	NSW
314	Sami Sauiluma	2013	2014	15	5	0	0	20	—	—
315	Bill Tupou	2013	2015	14	3	0	0	12	—	—
316	Matthew Allwood	2014	2014	11	1	0		4	—	—
317	Shannon Boyd	2014	2018	111	9	0	0	36	AUS	—
318	Kyle O'Donnell	2014	2014	5	0	0	0	0	—	—
319	Mitch Cornish	2014	2015	15	1	0	0	4	—	—
320	Brenko Lee	2014	2016	15	12	0	0	44	TON	—
321	Kurt Baptiste	2014	2017	56	5	0	0	20	PNG	—
322	Jordan Rapana	2014	2024	214	106	35	2	496	COK→NZL	—
323	Jeremy Hawkins	2014	2015	5	2	0	0	8	—	—
324	Blake Austin	2015	2018	88	34	0	0	136	—	—
325	Josh Hodgson	2015	2022	138	14	0	0	56	ENG	—
326	Iosia Soliola	2015	2021	137	18	1	0	74	NZL→SAM	—
327	Sisa Waqa	2015	2015	21	6	0	0	24	FIJ	—
328	Luke Bateman	2015	2018	71	1	0	0	4	—	—
329	Frank-Paul Nu'uausala	2015	2016	31	1	0	0	4	NZL	—
330	Joseph Leilua	2015	2019	91	39	0	0	156	SAM	—
331	Mitchell Barnett	2015	2015	2	0	0	0	0	—	—
332	Aidan Sezer	2016	2019	84	14	33	4	126	—	—
333	Elliott Whitehead	2016	2024	205	44	0	0	176	ENG	—
334	Jeff Lima	2016	2017	9	0	0	0	0	NZL→SAM	—
335	Lachlan Croker	2016	2016	1	0	0	0	0	—	—
336	Joseph Tapine	2016		240	30	0	0	120	NZL	—
337	Clay Priest	2016	2017	31	0	0	0	0	—	—
338	Junior Paulo	2016	2018	55	2	0	0	8	SAM	—
339	Zac Santo	2016	2017	2	1	0	0	4	—	—
340	Adam Clydsdale	2016	2017	4	0	0	0	0	—	—
341	Nick Cotric	2017	2024	135	60	0	0	240	—	NSW
342	Dunamis Lui	2017	2021	89	3	0	0	12	SAM	—
343	Scott Sorensen	2017	2017	2	0	0	0	0	—	—
344	David Taylor	2017	2017	11	0	0	0	0	AUS	QLD
345	Royce Hunt	2017	2017	1	0	0	0	0	—	—
346	Michael Oldfield	2017	2020	24	12	0	0	48	TON	—
347	Siliva Havili	2018	2021	80	5	0	0	20	TON→NZL	—
348	Charlie Gubb	2018	2018	5	0	0	0	0	—	—
349	Liam Knight	2018	2018	10	1	0	0	4	—	—
350	Ata Hingano	2018	2018	10	0	0	0	0	TON	—
351	Brad Abbey	2018	2018	9	1	0	0	4	—	—
352	Jack Murchie	2018	2019	3	0	0	0	0	—	—
353	Emre Guler	2018	2024	93	6	0	0	24	—	—
354	John Bateman	2019	2020	34	8	0	0	32	ENG	—
355	Charnze Nicoll-Klokstad	2019	2022	66	23	0	0	92	NZL	—
356	Bailey Simonsson	2019	2021	45	16	0	0	64	NZL	—
357	Corey Horsburgh	2019	2026	132	10	0	0	40	—	—
358	Ryan Sutton	2019	2022	75	4	0	0	16	—	—
359	Hudson Young	2019		155	59	0	0	236	AUS	NSW
360	JJ Collins	2019	2019	1	0	0	0	0	—	—
361	Sebastian Kris	2019		124	50	0	0	200	—	—
362	Tom Starling	2019		155	17	0	0	68	—	—
363	Curtis Scott	2020	2021	23	3	0	0	12	—	—
364	George Williams	2020	2021	32	10	16	2	74	—	—
365	Kai O'Donnell	2020	2020	4	1	0	0	4	—	—
366	Semi Valemei	2020	2022	29	9	0	0	36	—	—
367	Harley Smith-Shields	2020	2023	15	4	0	0	16	—	—
368	Corey Harawira-Naera	2020	2023	56	9	3	0	42	—	—
369	Matthew Timoko	2020		130	40	0	0	160	NZL	—
370	Adam Cook	2020	2025	8	0	5	0	10	—	—
371	Matt Frawley	2020	2023	22	5	0	1	23	—	—
372	Darby Medlyn	2020	2020	1	0	0	0	0	—	—
373	Jarrett Subloo	2020	2020	1	0	0	0	0	—	—
374	Ryan James	2021	2021	14	3	0	0	12	—	—
375	Caleb Aekins	2021	2021	7	0	0	0	0	—	—
376	Brad Schneider	2021	2023	12	1	23	0	50	—	—
377	Xavier Savage	2021		87	49	0	0	196	—	—
378	Elijah Anderson	2021	2023	1	0	0	0	0	—	—
379	James Schiller	2022	2024	15	9	0	0	36	—	—
380	Adam Elliott	2022	2022	24	2	0	0	8	—	—
381	Adrian Trevilyan	2022	2024	3	0	0	0	0	—	—
382	Harry Rushton	2022	2022	3	0	0	0	0	—	—
383	Zac Woolford	2022	2024	39	0	0	0	0	—	—
384	Jamal Fogarty	2022	2025	77	8	216	4	468	—	—
385	Trey Mooney	2022	2025	25	2	0	0	8	—	—
386	Albert Hopoate	2022	2025	37	13	0	0	52	—	—
387	Ata Mariota	2022		90	4	0	0	16	SAM	—
388	Danny Levi	2023	2025	28	6	0	0	24	—	—
389	Pasami Saulo	2023	2025	30	0	0	0	0	—	—
390	Peter Hola	2023	2024	2	0	0	0	0	—	—
391	Ethan Strange	2023		67	23	5	0	102	—	NSW
392	Hohepa Puru	2023	2024	2	0	0	0	0	—	—
393	Zac Hosking	2024		50	13	0	0	52	—	—
394	Morgan Smithies	2024	2026	70	1	0	0	4	ENG	—
395	Simi Sasagi	2024		48	16	0	0	64	—	—
396	Chevy Stewart	2024		5	0	1	0	2	—	—
397	Kaeo Weekes	2024		66	33	8	0	148	—	—
398	Jordan Martin	2024	2025	1	0	0	0	0	—	—
399	Savelio Tamale	2025		33	14	0	0	56	—	—
400	Owen Pattie	2025		41	6	0	0	24	—	—
401	Matty Nicholson	2025		16	6	0	0	24	—	—
402	Noah Martin	2025		17	6	0	0	24	—	—
403	Ethan Sanders	2025		25	3	84	1	181	—	—
404	Jed Stuart	2025		28	11	0	0	44	—	—
405	Michael Asomua	2025	2026	1	1	0	0	4	—	—
406	Manaia Waitere	2025	2025	1	0	0	0	0	—	—
407	Joseph Roddy	2025		8	2	0	0	8	—	—
408	Kain Anderson	2025	2026	1	0	0	0	0	—	—
409	Jayden Brailey	2026	2026	16	0	0	0	0	—	—
410	Daine Laurie	2026		15	4	0	0	0	—	—
411	Jordan Uta	2026		1	1	1	1	0	—	—
412	Vena Patuki-Case	2026		2	0	0	0	0	—	—
413	Coby Black	2026		1	2	9	0	26	—	—
414	Malachi Smith	2026		1	0	0	0	0	—	—
