= 1989 World Club Challenge =

English–Australian rugby league match

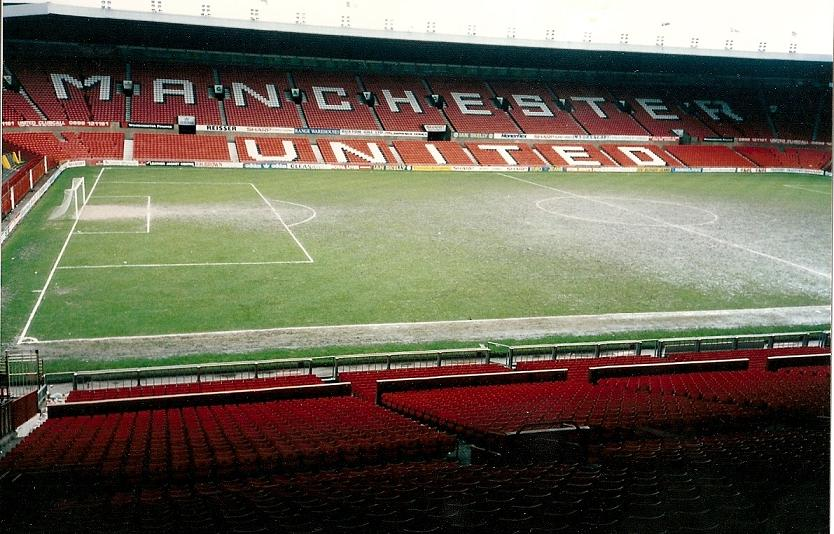
- Old Trafford hosted the match
Widnes	Canberra Raiders
(RFL)	(NSWRL)
30	18
	1	2	Total
WID	10	20	30
CAN	12	6	18
- Date: 4 October 1989
- Stadium: Old Trafford
- Location: Manchester, England
- Man of the Match: David Hulme
- Referee: Francois Desplas (France)
- Attendance: 30,786

Broadcast partners
- Broadcasters: BBC1 (United Kingdom); Network Ten (Australia)
- Commentators: Ray French; Alex Murphy

The 1989 World Club Challenge (known for sponsorship reasons as the Foster's World Club Challenge) was the third ever and first official World Club Challenge match. 1989's NSWRL season premiers, the Canberra Raiders travelled to England to play 1988–89 RFL champions, Widnes.

== Background ==
The project of an official World Club Championship made its way to the press in early 1988, and was further delineated during a meeting between RFL general secretary David Oxley and ARL president/IRLB director general Ken Arthurson in Hawaii. Reception was mostly positive, with star player Andy Gregory calling it "an excellent idea", while Manchester Evening News pundit Jack McNamara liked it due to Japan's relative familiarity with rugby union. The suggested format originally included two eliminators, one for the northern hemisphere between the British and French champions, and another in the southern hemisphere between the champions of Australia, New Zealand and Papua New Guinea. These eliminators would then be followed by a grand final played in Tokyo, Japan. The climactic game was slated for May 1989.

However, in mid-October 1988, the Australians withdrew from the competition. One reason was the absence of commitment from a television broadcaster. Another was that no stadium could be booked in Tokyo due to pressures from the Japanese Rugby Football Union. An alternate venue was found in Fukuoka, but Ken Arthurson opposed the move to avoid unfavorable comparisons to the Australian Football League, which had played its Japanese games in the capital. The RFL was greatly displeased. It lodged a protest with the IRLB, and promised to formally demand that the tournament proceed in 1990. It also mentioned China as a viable option to replace Japan.

Despite the lack of an official IRLB sanction, RFL representatives Widnes announced that they would bypass governing bodies and approach then Australian champions Canterbury-Bankstown directly to face them in an unofficial world championship. To entice the Australian side, Liverpool's Anfield stadium was touted as a potential venue. A single game and a home-and-home were both considered, with the Australian game potentially part of a three-week tour that would also see Widnes play regional selects teams. However the two clubs could not agree on a common date, with Canterbury favoring February and Widnes preferring May. A few days later, it was confirmed that these efforts were abandoned.

Interest from the Australians was rumored to have picked up again after Widnes signed highly regarded rugby union defector Jonathan Davies in a blockbuster deal, providing the competition with a more tangible promotional angle in the southern hemisphere. Canterbury-Bankstown reached out to Widnes in January to meet them at the end of the English season, but it was too late to accommodate them. The competition was re-introduced at the IRLB's annual convention on 2 May 1989, where it finally garnered official approval. Foster's was announced as title sponsor and a prize money of £50,000 was allocated. The BBC's Sportsnight committed to show the game's highlights. The eventual date and location, October 4 at Old Trafford, were also chosen at that time.

== Road to WCC ==
=== Widnes ===
Coach Doug Laughton's team had won many admirers throughout England for their free-flowing, attacking style of rugby. At this time player poaching from rugby union was at a level not seen in decades, and the Chemics benefited from a board flush with cash. Three members of their back division all came from the amateur code. Alan Tait started in union for Scotland but had grown up around league as his father played for Workington Town in the Borders. Jonathan Davies cited a need to provide for a young family and heavy pressure as Wales five-eighth as his motivation for accepting a then-record £230,000 signing fee. Finally Martin Offiah had scored 100 tries in 76 matches for Widnes to become the game’s hottest property. Combining with home-grown talents like Andy Currier, the Hulme brothers and Tony Myler, the Chemics scored 726 points in the 1988–89 league, winning the title over Wigan by three points.

Although Widnes came into the World Club Challenge having won its second straight Stones Bitter League Championship, contemporary press indicates that the club had secured its status as English representatives in the long-in-doubt event by virtue of its first place in the 1987–88 league standings. While the Oceanian qualifier mooted at an early stage did not take place, the European Club Challenge between English and French representatives did proceed on 27 May 1989, albeit under less than ideal circumstances. After the intended opponents, 1987–88 French champions Le Pontet XIII, dropped out, Widnes trounced their replacements St. Estève 60–6.

=== Canberra Raiders ===
The 1989 NSWRL season was the 8th in the history of Australian club the Canberra Raiders. Coached by Tim Sheens and captained by Australian international centre Mal Meninga, the Raiders finished the minor rounds in 4th spot. They then won through to their second ever Grand Final (after playing in the 1987 game) where they made history by not only being the first team to win the premiership from 4th spot or lower after defeating Balmain in the Grand Final, but also by becoming the first non-Sydney team to win the premiership in its history dating back to 1908. Canberra Raiders would go on to win back to back Premierships in 1990.

== Rosters ==
Widnes	Canberra Raiders

FB	1	Alan Tait
RW	2	Andy Currier
CE	3	Jonathan Davies
CE	4	Darren Wright
LW	5	Martin Offiah
SO	6	Tony Myler
SH	7	David Hulme
PR	8	Joe Grima
HK	9	Phil McKenzie
PR	10	Derek Pyke
SR	11	Kurt Sorensen (c)
SR	12	Paul Hulme
LF	13	Richard Eyres
Substitutions:
IC	14	Barry Dowd
IC	15	Paul Moriarty
IC	16	Brimah Kebbie
IC	17	David Smith
Coach:
(England) Doug Laughton

FB	1	Gary Belcher
RW	2	Matthew Wood
CE	3	Mal Meninga (c)
CE	4	Laurie Daley
LW	5	John Ferguson
FE	6	Chris O'Sullivan
HB	7	Ricky Stuart
PR	8	Steve Jackson
HK	9	Steve Walters
PR	10	Glenn Lazarus
SR	11	Dean Lance
SR	12	Gary Coyne
LK	13	Bradley Clyde
Substitutions:
IC	14	Phil Carey
IC	15	Paul Martin
IC	16	Mark Lowry
IC	17	Craig Bellamy
Coach:
(Australia) Tim Sheens

== Details ==
Wednesday 4 October

Widnes	30 – 18	Canberra Raiders
Tries: Martin Offiah (2); Jonathan Davies; Richard Eyres; Paul Hulme; Darren Wright; Goals: Jonathan Davies (3)		Tries: Mal Meninga; Chris O'Sullivan; Steve Walters Goals: Matthew Wood (2); Chris O'Sullivan (1)

Old Trafford, Manchester
Attendance: 30,786
Referee: Francois Desplas (France)
Player of the Match: David Hulme

The match was played on Wednesday, 4 October at Old Trafford, Manchester. A crowd of 30,786 saw an all-action game of two halves, with a Mal Meninga-inspired Canberra opening up a 12-0 lead by playing a brand of rugby that BBC commentator Ray French described as "like basketball". However Widnes' offload game would bring them back into the match, with tries by Offiah and Paul Hulme both coming as a result of good late passes to make it 12-10 at the interval. The match turned in the second half when Jonathan Davies was clothes-lined across the chin by Laurie Daley in the act of scoring a try: Daley could call himself lucky to only be given a sin-bin by the French referee. Widnes took full advantage of having the extra man by crossing the Stretford End try-line twice courtesy of Offiah and Eyres, before Darren Wright completed a length of the field try under the posts to complete the rout. Steve Walters scored a valedictory four-pointer for the Australians. David Hulme was named man-of-the-match.
