= Gavin Price-Jones =

Wales international rugby league footballer

Personal information
- Full name: Gavin Price-Jones
- Born: 19 December 1970 (age 54); Hemel Hempstead, Hertfordshire, England

Playing information
- Position: Wing, Centre, Second-row
Club
Years	Team	Pld	T	G	FG	P
	Canberra Raiders
1994–99	Swinton	138	44	29	8	242
2000	Rochdale Hornets	25	5	0	0	20
	Total	163	49	29	8	262
Representative
Years	Team	Pld	T	G	FG	P
1995	Wales	2

Gavin Price-Jones is a former professional rugby league footballer who played in the 1990s and 2000s. He played at representative level for Wales, and at club level for the Canberra Raiders (Presidents Cup team), Swinton and Rochdale Hornets, as a wing, centre, or second-row.

== Playing career ==
=== International honours ===
Gavin Price-Jones won caps for Wales while a Welsh Student in 1995 against the United States (2 matches).

=== Club career ===
Gavin Price-Jones played for the Canberra Raiders in the 1990 Presidents Cup alongside; Anthony Rudd, Brett Mullins, Roger Kenworthy, Darrell McDonald, Steve Stone (c). Jason Gregory, Brett Goldspink, Brett Boyd, Darren Fritz, Matthew Baker, Peter Field, Jason Death. Reserves: Nigel Gaffey, Kevin Hinton, David Boyle, Matthew Jones and Adrian Davis
