= Gary Britt =

Australian rugby league player

Personal information
- Born: 21 March 1962 (age 63)

Playing information
- Position: Second-row
Club
| Years | Team | Pld | T | G | FG | P |
|---|---|---|---|---|---|---|
| 1982–85 | Canberra Raiders | 19 | 2 | 9 | 0 | 24 |

Gary Britt (born 21 March 1962) is an Australian former rugby league player for the Canberra Raiders.

A foundation player, Britt joined the Canberra Raiders from Yass prior to the 1982 NSWRFL season. He started out on the bench, then got his maiden first-grade start in round 15, partnering Jon Hardy in the second-row. An attacking forward, Britt was a capable goal-kicker when required and kicked five goals, along with a try, in a win over St. George that season. From 1983, Britt was largely restricted to the reserves.

Britt's son Matt played with the Raiders in the Toyota Cup.
