= Richard Cooke (rugby league) =

Australian rugby league player

Playing information
- Position: Prop / Second-row
Club
Years	Team	Pld	T	G	FG	P
1977	Penrith Panthers	3	0	0	0	0
1982	Canberra Raiders	16	0	0	0	0
	Total	19	0	0	0	0

Richard Cooke is an Australian former rugby league player for the Penrith Panthers and Canberra Raiders.

A St Mary's junior, Cooke competed in the Jersey Flegg Cup with the Penrith Panthers and featured briefly in their first-grade side during the 1977 NSWRFL season, after which he left to join the Queanbeayan Blues.

Cooke was a foundation player for the Canberra Raiders in the 1982 NSWRFL season, making 16 first-grade appearances as a prop and second-rower.

After his season with the Raiders, Cooke moved to Perth and coached North Beach to a grand final, while earning Western Australian representative honours as captain.

Cooke returned to Canberra in 1985 to captain-coach the Woden Valley Rams.
