= Lee Pomfret =

Australian rugby league footballer

Personal information
- Full name: Lee Pomfret
- Born: 8 December 1957 (age 68) Canterbury, New South Wales, Australia

Playing information
- Position: Fullback, Halfback, Centre, Wing
Club
Years	Team	Pld	T	G	FG	P
1977	St. George	2	0	0	0	0
1980–81	Canterbury-Bankstown	15	4	0	0	12
1982–83	Illawarra Steelers	31	12	0	0	42
	Total	48	16	0	0	54
- Source: As of 26 February 2019

Lee Pomfret (born 8 December 1957) is an Australian former professional rugby league footballer who played in the 1970s and 1980s. Pomfret was a foundation player for Illawarra playing in the club's first game.

== Background ==
Pomfret was born in Canterbury, New South Wales and played his junior rugby league for the Peakhurst Hawks.

== Playing career ==
Pomfret made his first grade debut for St George in Round 1 1977 against Penrith at Kogarah Oval. St George went on to win the premiership in 1977 but Pomfret was not a member of the grand final winning team.

In 1980, Pomfret joined Canterbury-Bankstown and made 10 appearances in his first year at the club. Pomfret played in 2 finals games but was not selected in the grand final team which defeated Eastern Suburbs to win their first premiership in 38 years.

In 1982, Pomfret joined newly admitted Illawarra and played in the club's first ever game which was against Penrith at WIN Stadium and ended in a 17–7 loss. Pomfret looked set to cement his first grade place at fullback with I’warra in 1982 but in a match against Wests he was left with a broken nose and fractured cheekbone after an altercation with opposing forward Bob Cooper.

Pomfret played with Illawarra up until the end of the 1983 season before retiring.
