= Derek Pyke =

English rugby league footballer

Personal information
- Born: 7 November 1959 (age 65); Leigh, England

Playing information
- Position: Prop
Club
Years	Team	Pld	T	G	FG	P
1979–88	Leigh	220	27	0	0	102
1987–90	Widnes	66	0	0	0	0
1990–91	Oldham	5	0	0	0	0
	Total	291	27	0	0	102
Representative
Years	Team	Pld	T	G	FG	P
1986–88	Lancashire	3	0	0	0	0

Derek Pyke (born 7 November 1959) is an English former rugby union and professional rugby league footballer who played in the 1970s, 1980s and 1990s. He played representative level rugby union for England Schoolboys, and representative level rugby league for Lancashire, and at club level for Leigh, Widnes and Oldham, as a prop.

== Background ==
Derek Pyke's birth was registered in Leigh, Lancashire, England.

== Playing career ==
Pyke started his career in rugby union, where he was an England schoolboys international, before switching codes and joining Leigh.

In January 1988, Pyke was signed by Widnes in exchange for former Great Britain captain Harry Pinner, and £50,000. He played 66 games for Widnes, and also played in the team that won the 1989 World Club Challenge.

In 1990, Pyke was transferred from Widnes to Oldham for £50,000, but suffered a serious knee injury after playing only five matches for the club. After failing to make a full recovery from the injury, Pyke announced his retirement at the end of the 1990–91 season.
