= Mark Lowry (rugby league) =

Australian rugby league player

Personal information
- Born: 16 May 1968 (age 56)

Playing information
- Position: Second row
Club
Years	Team	Pld	T	G	FG	P
1989–91	Canberra Raiders	21	0	0	0	0
1991	Swinton Lions	15	1	0	0	4
1993	Canberra Raiders	6	1	0	0	4
	Total	42	2	0	0	8

Mark Lowry (born 16 May 1968) is an Australian former rugby league player for the Canberra Raiders.

After playing with the Orange Hawks, Lowry was signed by Canberra in 1987.

Lowry, a second rower, was a reserve for the Raiders in their 1989 NSWRL grand final win and he made the squad that travelled to England for the 1989 World Club Challenge against Widnes. At the end of the 1991 NSWRL season, Lowry was recruited alongside Craig Bellamy to play for the Swinton Lions, which were being coached by their Raiders teammate Chris O'Sullivan. He left after one season and returned to Canberra.
