= 1982 NSWRFL season =

Rugby league competition

1982 New South Wales Rugby Football League
- Teams: 14
- Premiers: Parramatta (2nd title)
- Minor premiers: Parramatta (2nd title)
- Matches played: 188
- Points scored: 5,927
- Total attendance: 1,716,490
- Top points scorer: Mick Cronin (279)
- Rothmans Medal: Greg Brentnall
- Top try-scorer: Steve Ella (23)

The 1982 NSWRFL season was the 75th season of professional rugby league football in Australia and saw the New South Wales Rugby Football League’s first expansion since 1967 with the introduction of the first two clubs from outside the Sydney area in over half a century: the Canberra Raiders and the Illawarra Steelers. Thus a total of 14 clubs (including 6 Sydney-based foundation teams, another 6 from Sydney, one from greater New South Wales, and one from the Australian Capital Territory) competed for the J.J. Giltinan Shield and newly-created Winfield Cup during the season, which culminated in a grand final between the Parramatta and Manly-Warringah clubs. This season, NSWRFL teams also competed for the 1982 KB Cup which was won by Manly-Warringah.

== Season summary ==
The first Charity Shield match was played before the 1982 season between St. George and South Sydney.

This year a bronze replica of “the Gladiators” – the 1963 photo taken by John O'Gready of Norm Provan and Arthur Summons’ post-game, mud-caked embrace – was first adopted to adorn the Winfield Cup, the new trophy to be awarded to the grand final winners. Because of the introduction of two new teams, twenty-six (rather than twenty-two) regular season rounds were played from February till August, resulting in a top five of Parramatta, Manly, Norths, Easts and Wests. The new teams, the Illawarra Steelers and the Canberra Raiders, would finish their debut seasons in second last and last place respectively.

The 1982 season saw the only nil-all scoreline in competition history. Newtown and Canterbury-Bankstown drew their match at Henson Park on 28 March, with neither team scoring a point. The long-standing record for the longest suspension for a player in the League's history was broken during the season. Western Suburbs' Bob Cooper was suspended for 15 months for punching Illawarra’s Lee Pomfret.

The 1982 season's Rothmans Medallist was Canterbury-Bankstown’s Greg Brentnall and the Dally M Award went to Parramatta’s lock forward, Ray Price. Rugby League Week gave their player of the year award to Eastern Suburbs’ halfback Kevin Hastings for the third consecutive season.

=== Teams ===
This year the number of clubs in the League reached a new high of fourteen, with the addition of two expansion clubs, the Illawarra Steelers and the Canberra Raiders. This saw the first inclusion of teams based outside of the Sydney area since the foundation Newcastle club departed the League in 1909. This was the first of several expansions that would take place over the next decade and a half which would see the Sydney-wide competition grow into a New South Wales-wide competition and eventually into a national league. Also, for the first time in three quarters of a century, the League's 1908 foundation teams were outnumbered by teams introduced since the inaugural season.

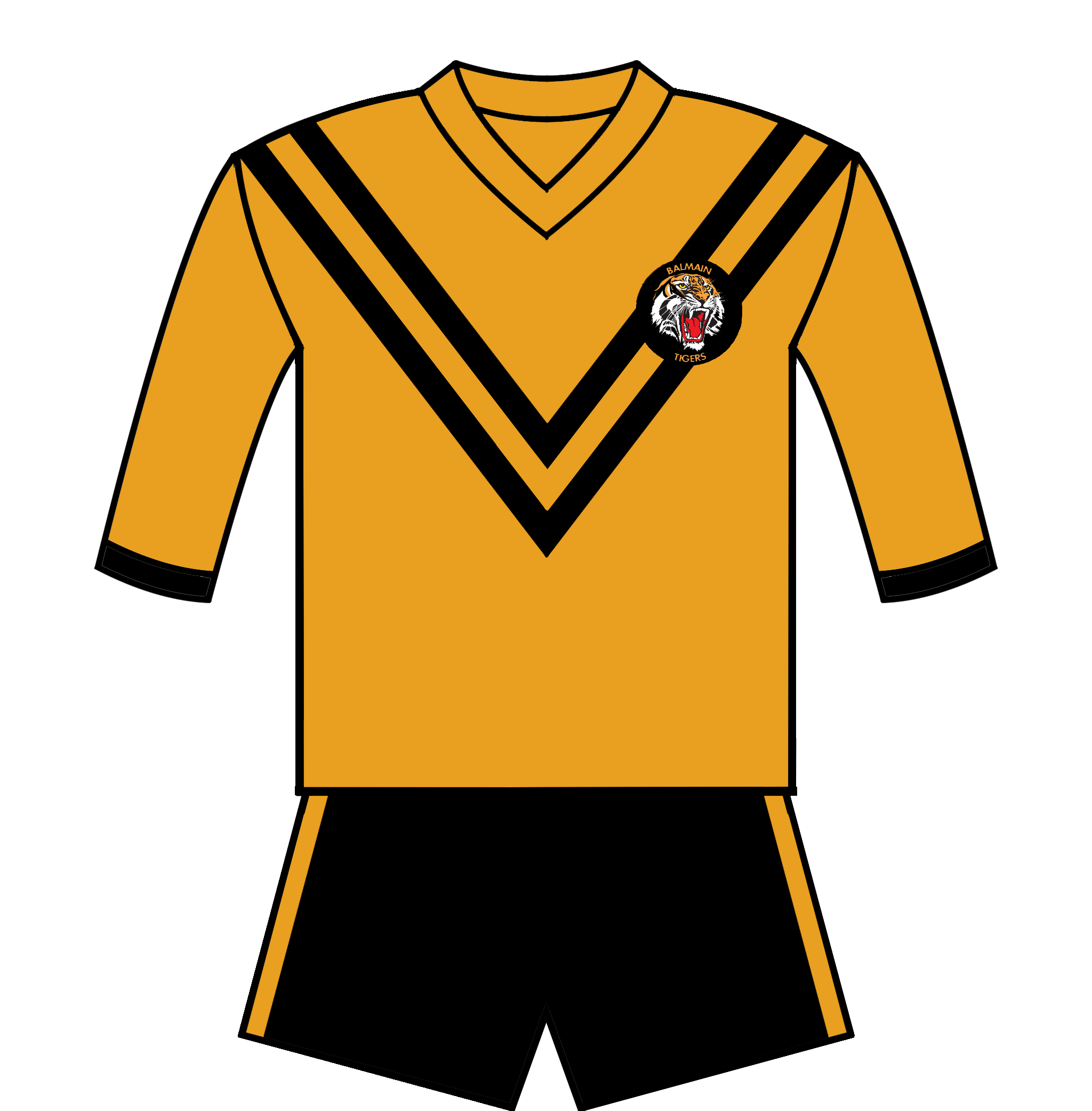
Balmain 75th season Ground: Leichhardt Oval; Coach: Frank Stanton; Captain: Neil Whittaker→Trevor Ryan

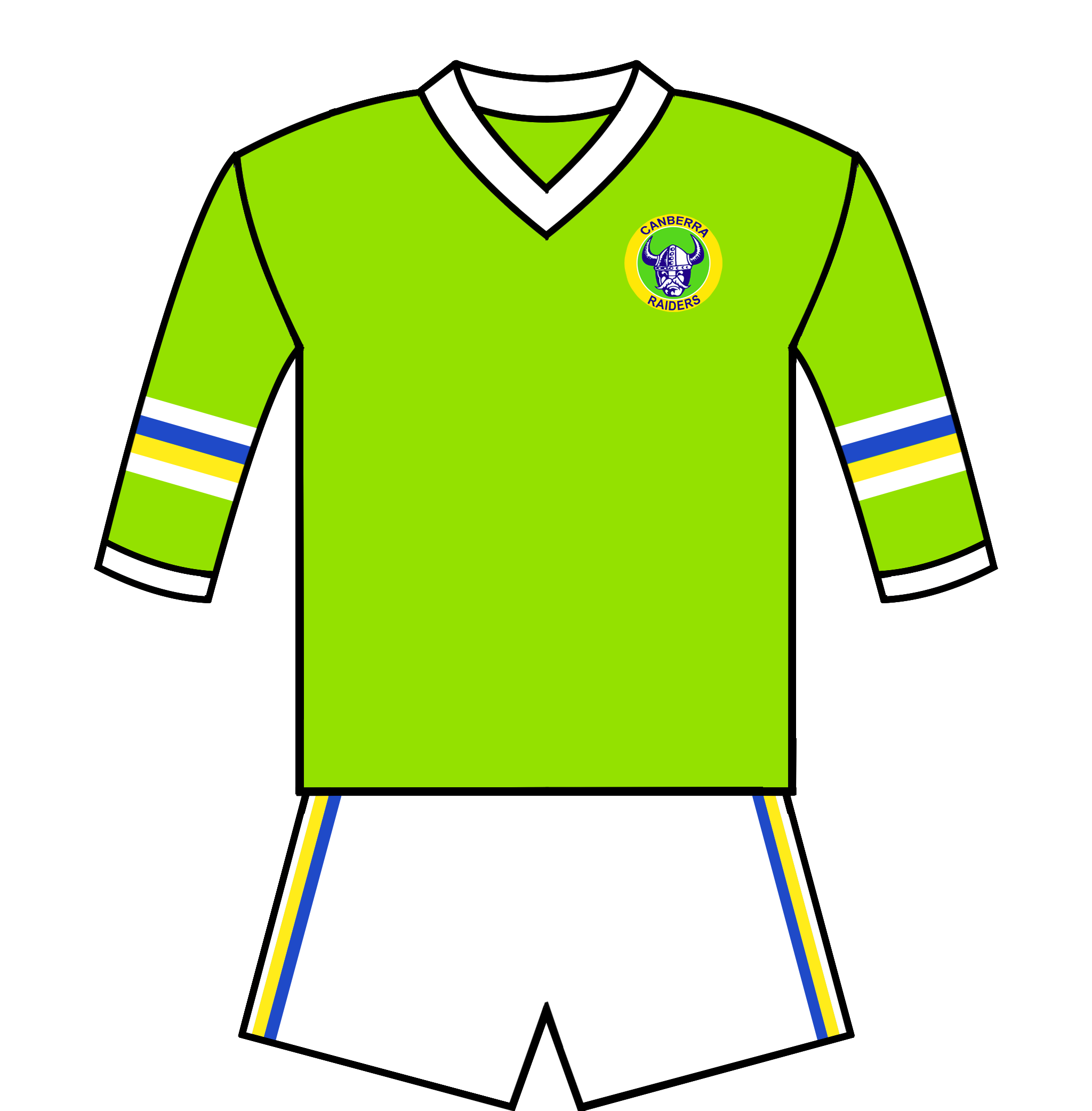
Canberra 1st season Ground: Seiffert Oval; Coach: Don Furner; Captain: David Grant

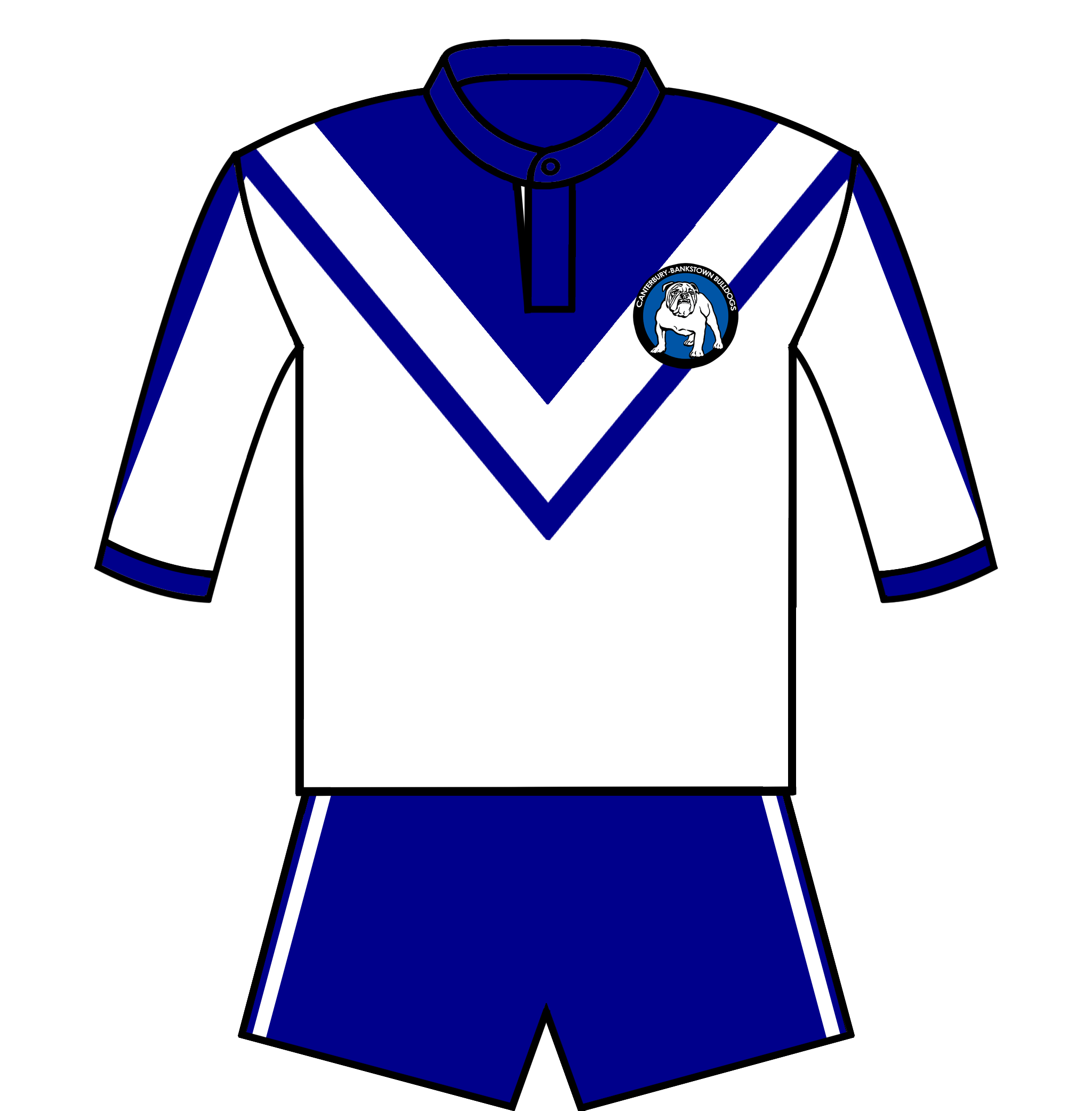
Canterbury-Bankstown 48th season Ground: Belmore Sports Ground; Coach: Ted Glossop; Captain: George Peponis

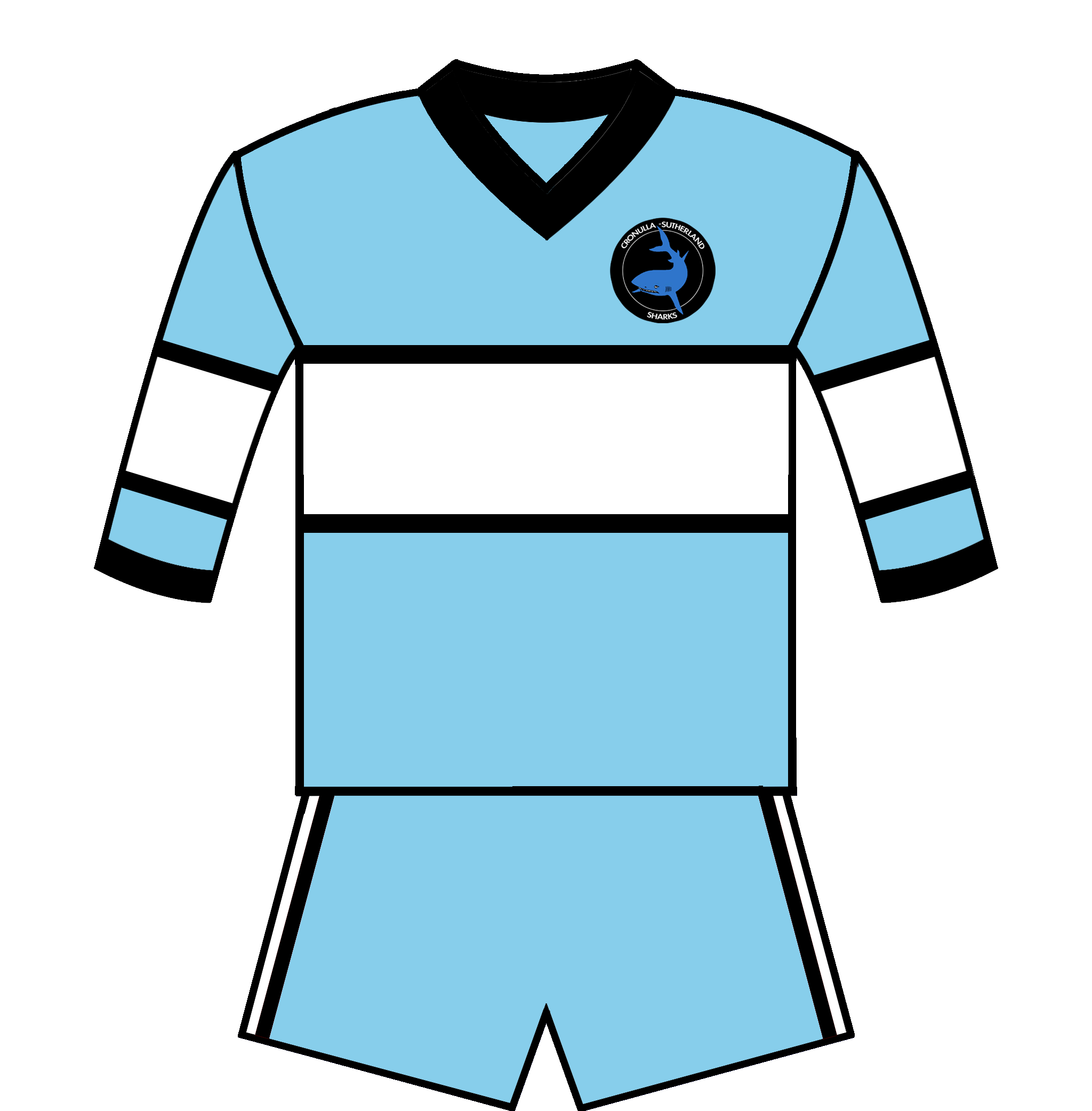
Cronulla-Sutherland 16th season Ground: Endeavour Field; Coach: Greg Pierce; Captain: Steve Rogers

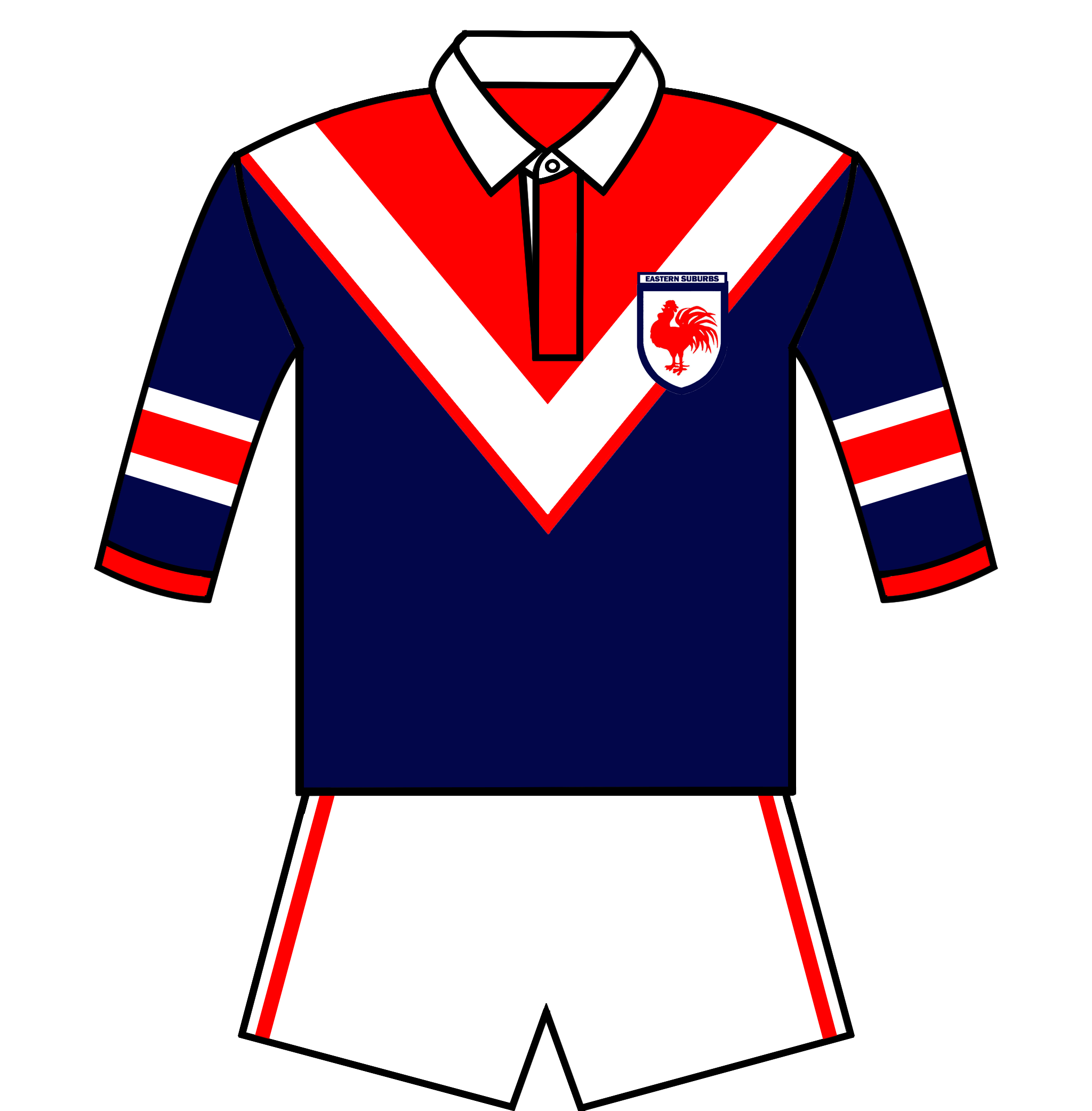
Eastern Suburbs 75th season Ground: Sydney Sports Ground; Coach: Bob Fulton; Captain: Royce Ayliffe

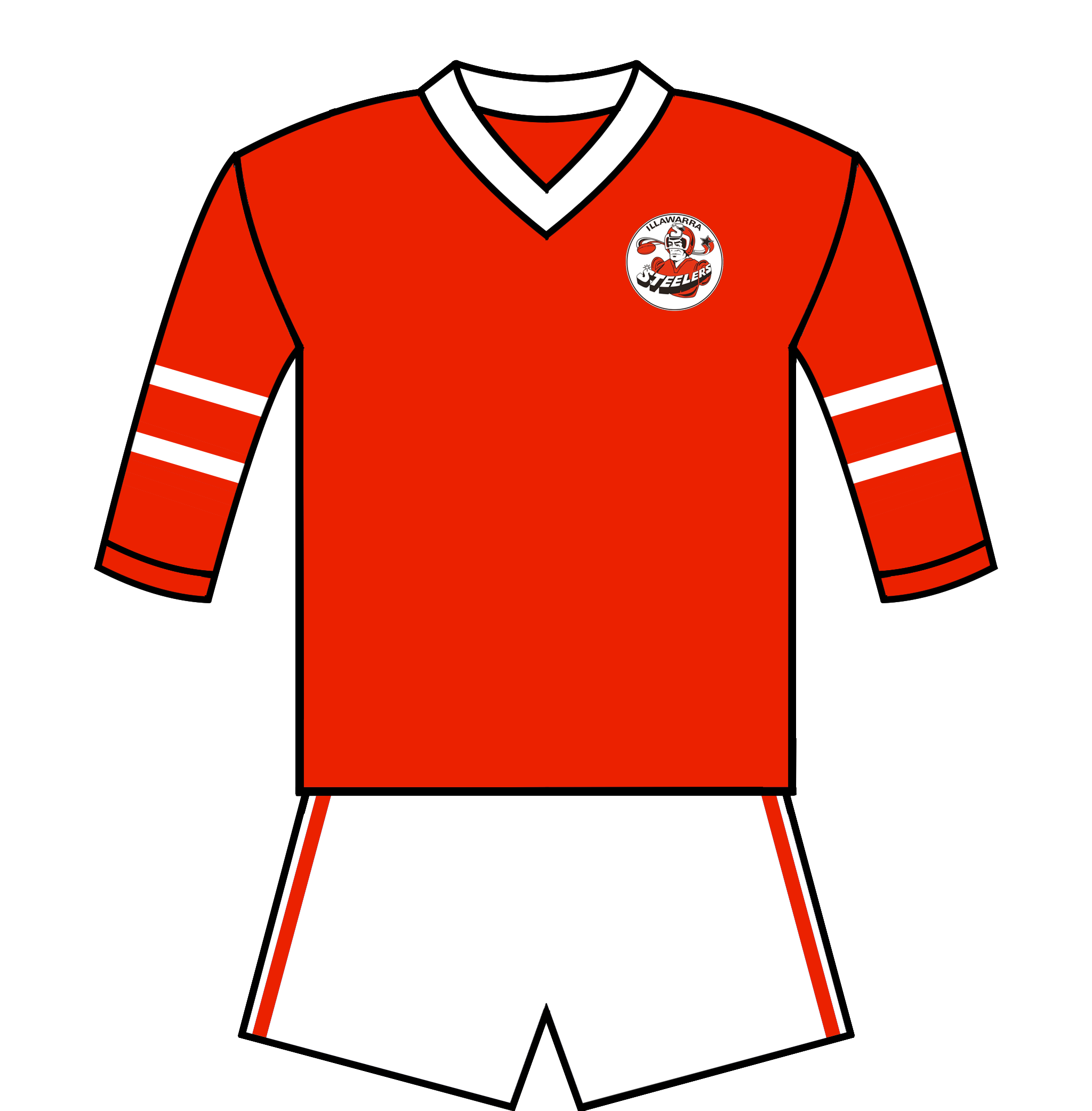
Illawarra 1st season Ground: Wollongong Showground; Coach: Allan Fitzgibbon; Captain: John Dorahy

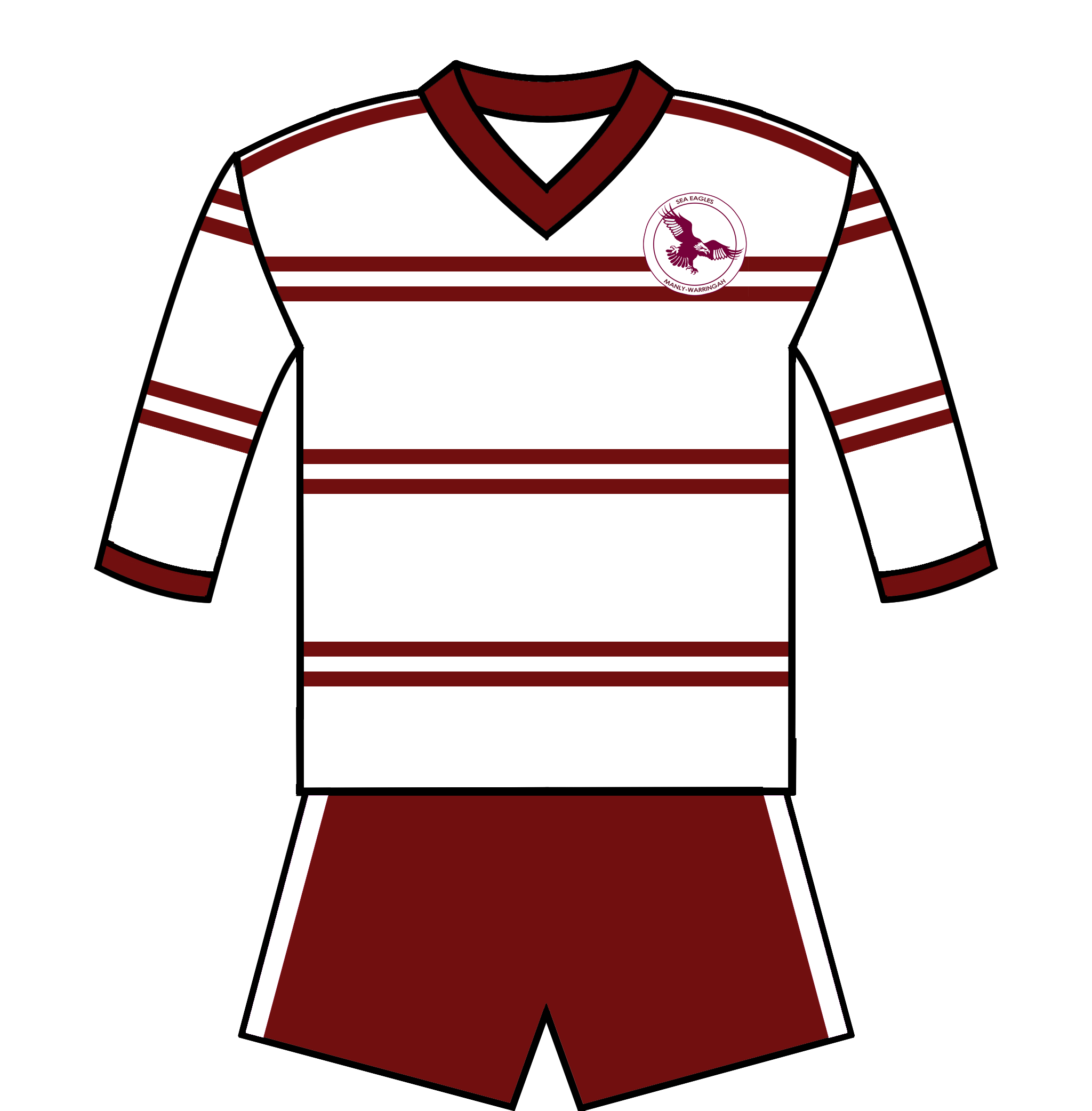
Manly-Warringah 36th season Ground: Brookvale Oval; Coach: Ray Ritchie; Captain: Max Krilich

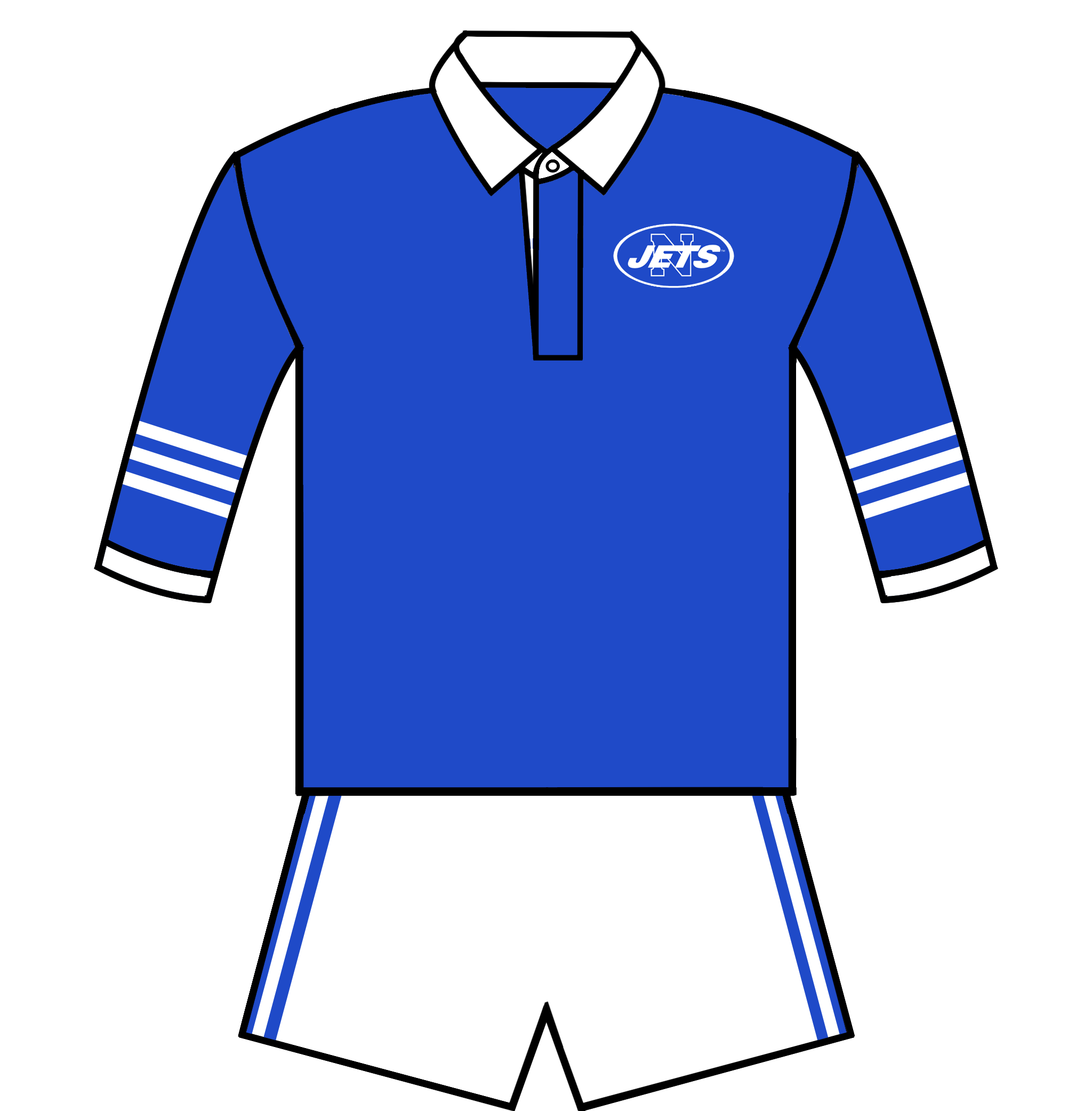
Newtown 75th season Ground: Henson Park; Coach: Warren Ryan; Captain: Tom Raudonikis & Ken Wilson

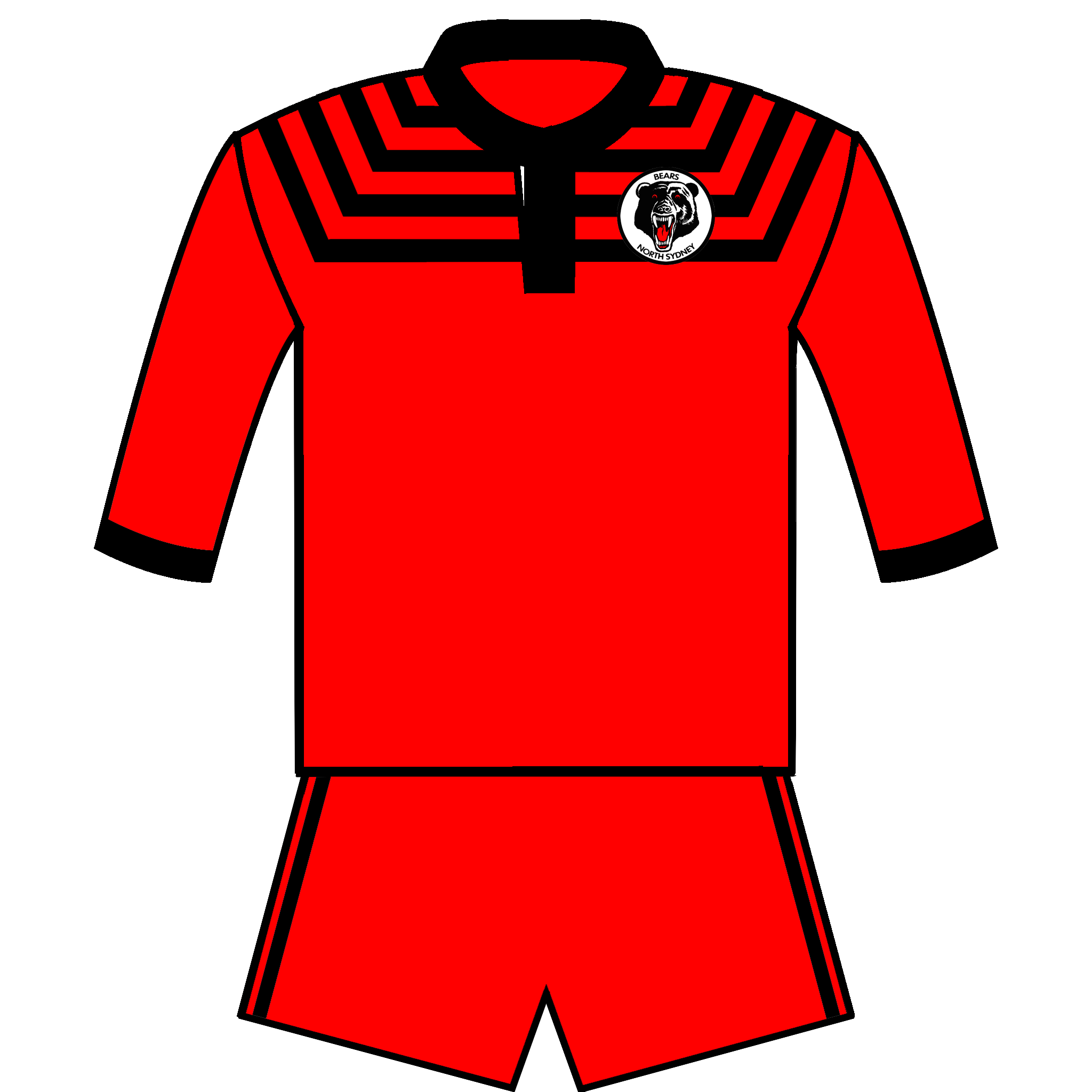
North Sydney 75th season Ground: North Sydney Oval; Coach: Ron Willey; Captain: Mark Graham

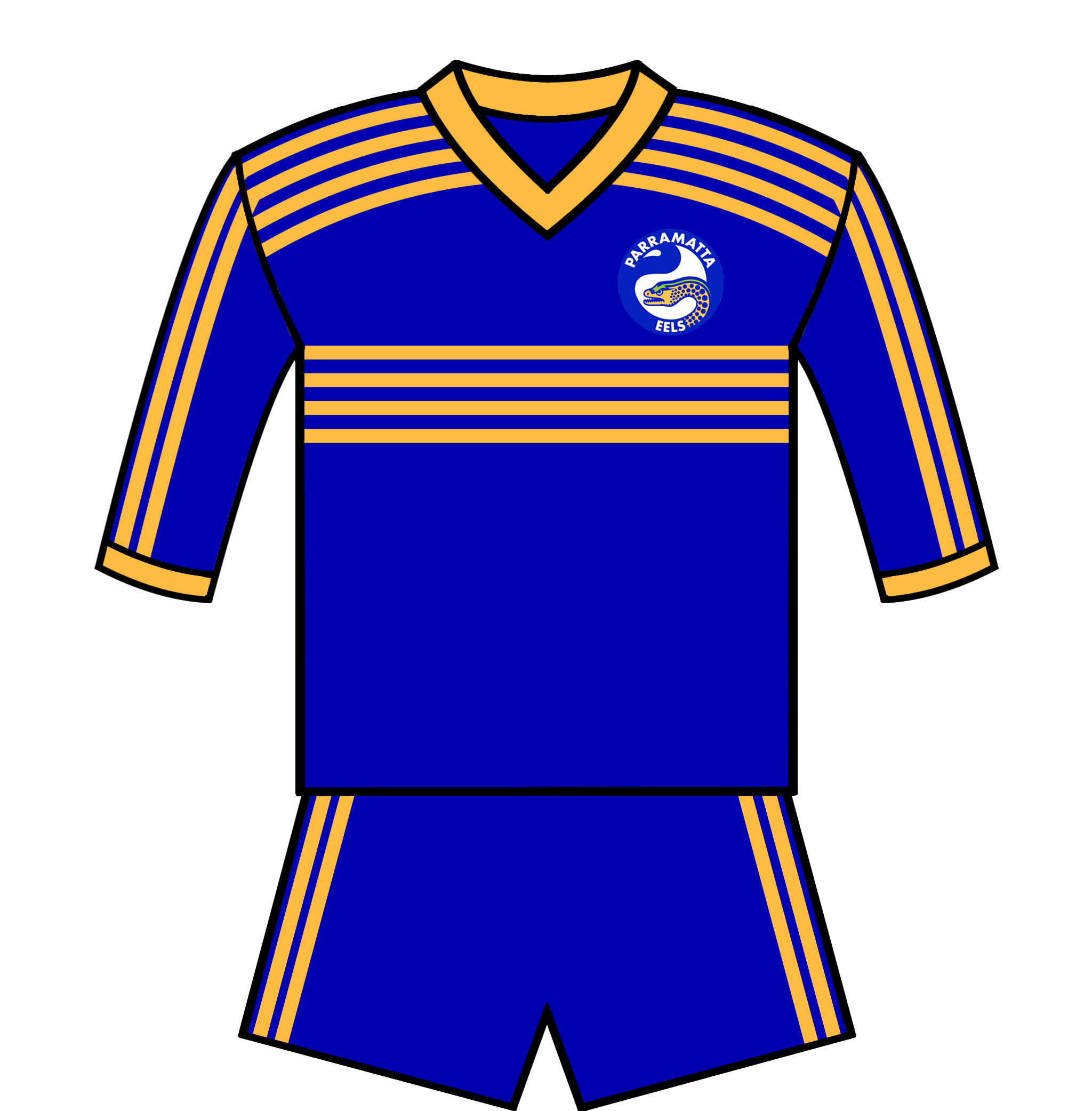
Parramatta 36th season Ground: Belmore Sports Ground; Coach: Jack Gibson; Captain: Steve Edge

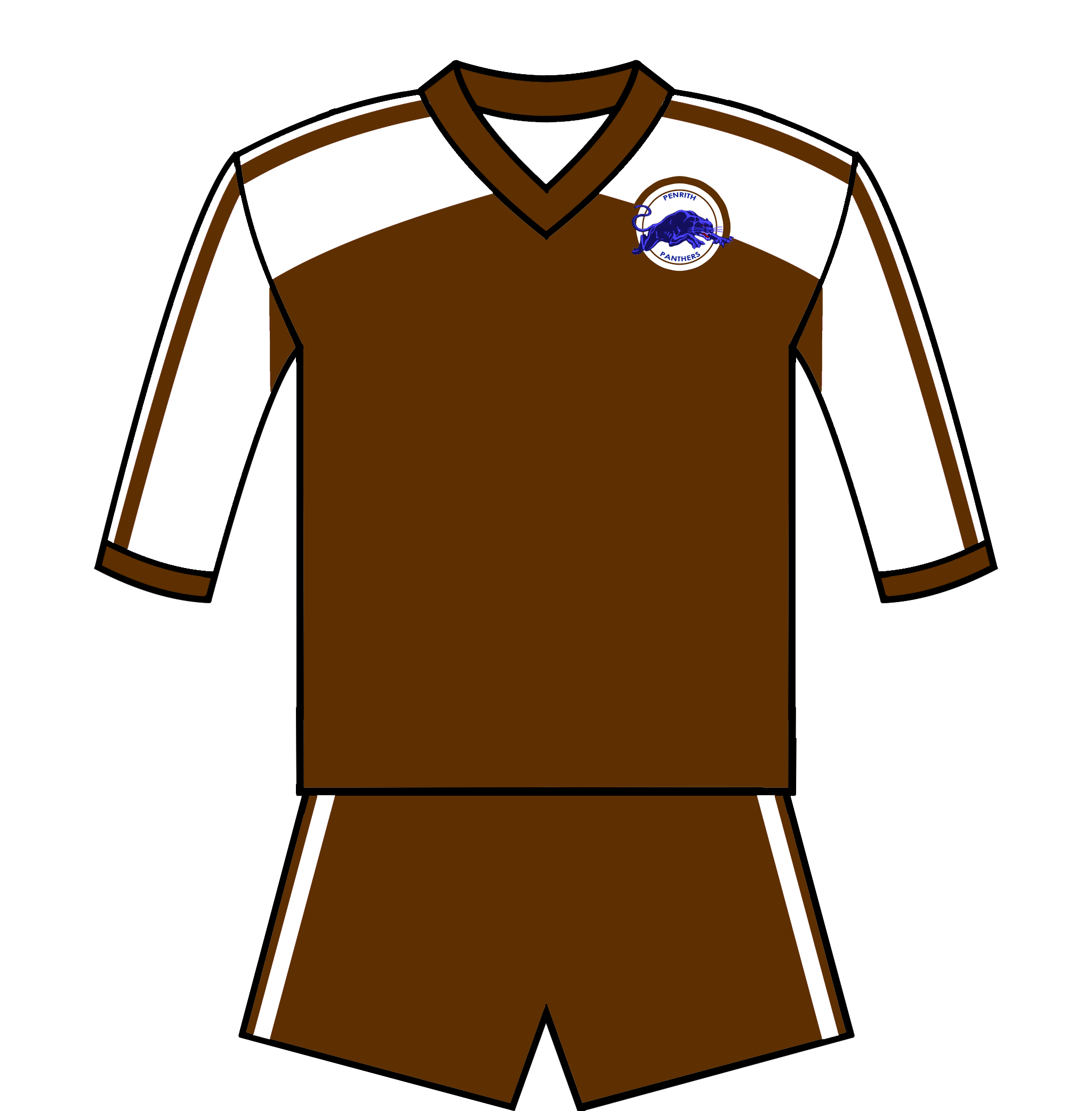
Penrith 16th season Ground: Penrith Stadium; Coach: John Peard; Captain: Darryl Brohman

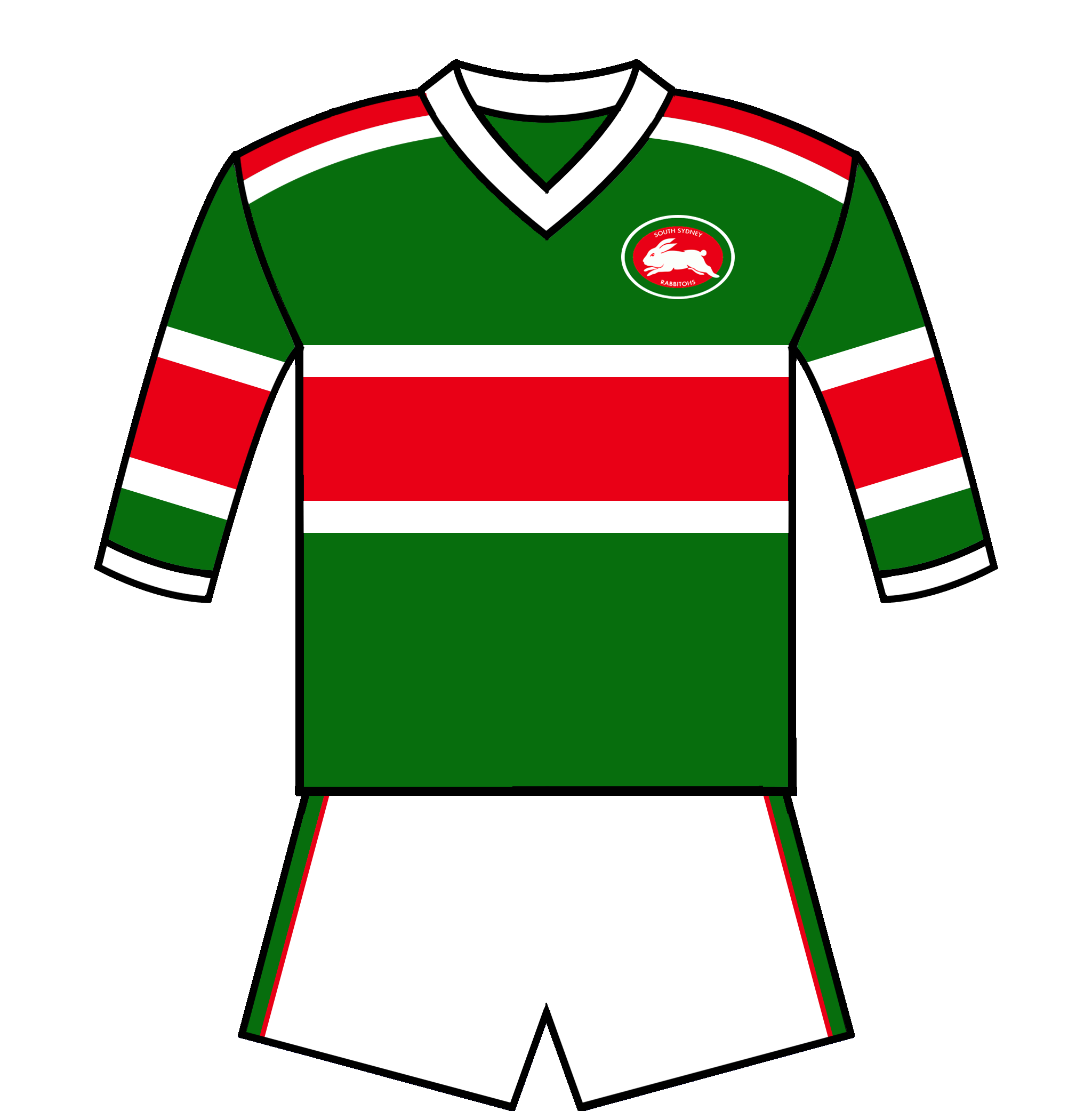
South Sydney 75th season Ground: Redfern Oval; Coach: Bill Anderson; Captain: Mitch Brennan

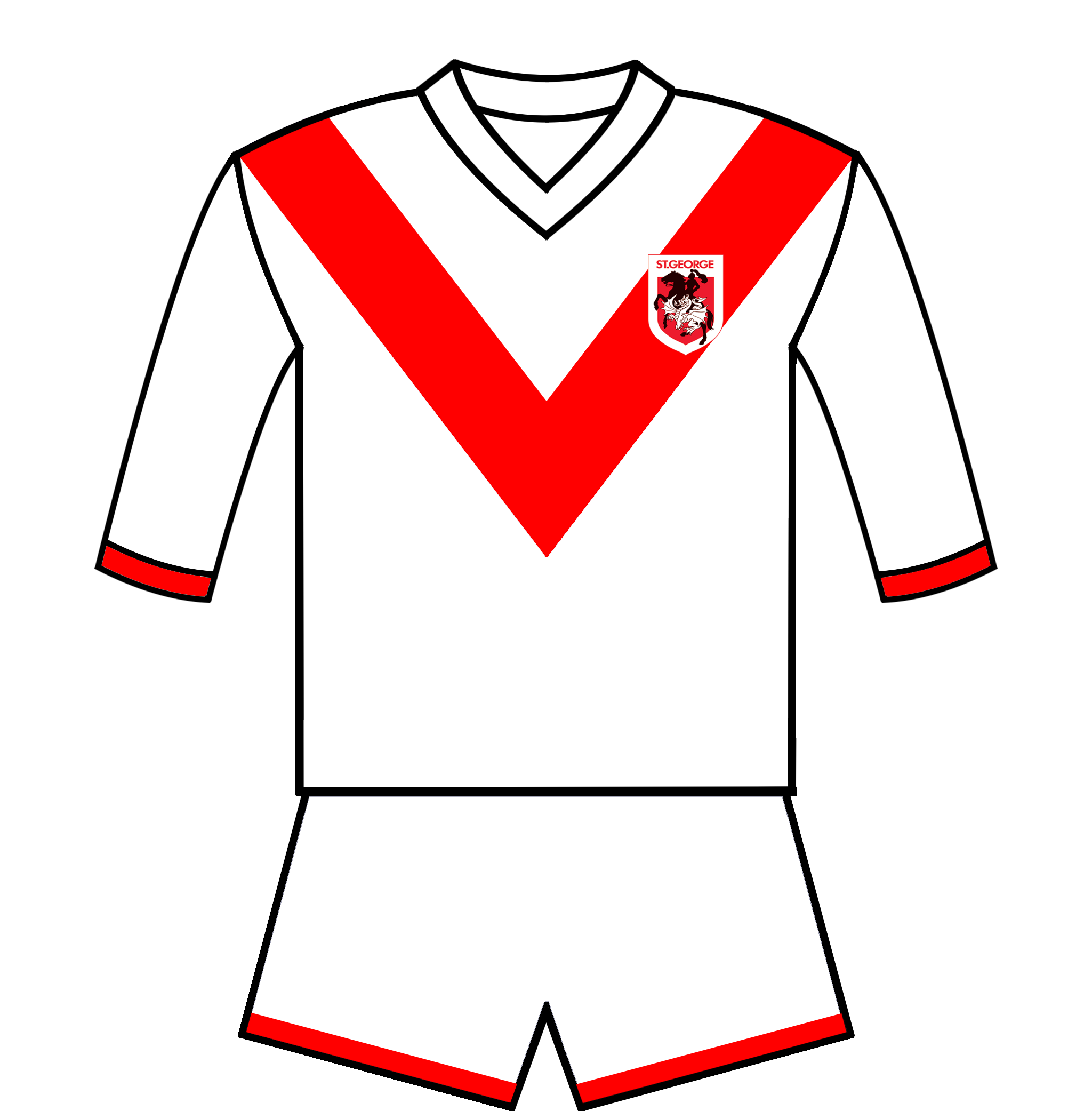
St. George 62nd season Ground: Jubilee Oval; Coach: Roy Masters; Captain: Craig Young

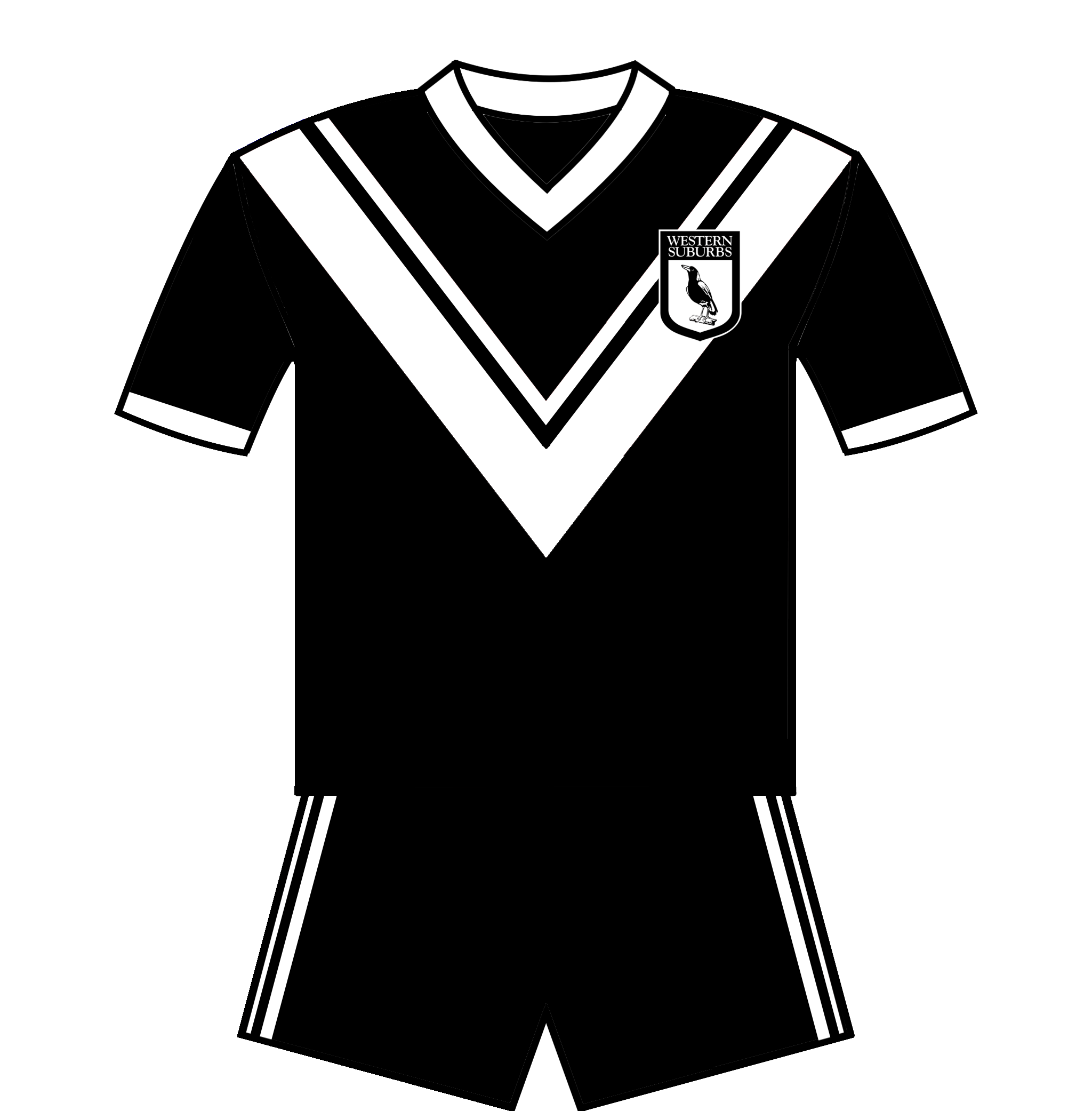
Western Suburbs 75th season Ground: Lidcombe Oval; Coach: Terry Fearnley; Captain: Warren Boland

=== Ladder ===
	Team	Pld	W	D	L	PF	PA	PD	Pts
1	Parramatta	26	21	0	5	619	242	+377	42
2	Manly	26	17	0	9	530	411	+119	34
3	North Sydney	26	16	1	9	399	360	+39	33
4	Eastern Suburbs	26	15	2	9	437	304	+133	32
5	Western Suburbs	26	16	0	10	412	349	+63	32
6	South Sydney	26	14	1	11	395	400	-5	29
7	Newtown	26	13	2	11	406	309	+97	28
8	Cronulla	26	13	1	12	400	336	+64	27
9	Canterbury	26	12	3	11	399	361	+38	27
10	St. George	26	11	2	13	408	402	+6	24
11	Balmain	26	10	1	15	383	427	-44	21
12	Penrith	26	7	1	18	375	441	-66	15
13	Illawarra	26	6	0	20	344	572	-228	12
14	Canberra	26	4	0	22	269	862	-593	8

== Finals ==
Home	Score	Away	Match information
Home	Score	Away	Date and time	Venue	Referee	Crowd
Qualifying Finals
Eastern Suburbs	11–7	Western Suburbs	4 September 1982	Sydney Cricket Ground	Jack Danzey	21,167
Manly-Warringah	26–3	North Sydney	5 September 1982	Sydney Cricket Ground	John Gocher	24,690
Semi-finals
North Sydney	10–12	Eastern Suburbs	11 September 1982	Sydney Cricket Ground	Jack Danzey	19,566
Parramatta	0–20	Manly-Warringah	12 September 1982	Sydney Cricket Ground	John Gocher	31,604
Preliminary final
Parramatta	33–0	Eastern Suburbs	19 September 1982	Sydney Cricket Ground	John Gocher	24,637
Grand final
Manly-Warringah	8–21	Parramatta	26 September 1982	Sydney Cricket Ground	John Gocher	52,186

=== Chart ===
Qualifying final
2	Manly	26
3	North Sydney	3
4	Eastern Suburbs	11
5	Western Suburbs	7

Major semi-final
1	Parramatta	0
Manly	20
Minor semi-final
North Sydney	10
Eastern Suburbs	12

Preliminary final
Parramatta	33
Eastern Suburbs	0

Grand final
Manly	8
Parramatta	21

=== Grand final ===
Manly-Warringah	Position	Parramatta
1. Graham Eadie	FB	1. Paul Taylor
2. John Ribot	WG	2. Neil Hunt
3. Chris Close	CE	3. Mick Cronin
4. Michael Blake	CE	4. Steve Ella
5. Phil Carey	WG	5. Eric Grothe
6. Alan Thompson (c)	FE	6. Brett Kenny
7. Phil Blake	HB	7. Peter Sterling
13. Geoff Gerard	PR	13. Geoff Bugden
12. Ray Brown	HK	12. Steve Edge (c)
11. Terry Randall	PR	11. Chris Phelan
10. Paul Vautin	SR	10. Steve Sharp
14. Les Boyd	SR	9. John Muggleton
8. Paul McCabe	LK	8. Ray Price
9. Bruce Walker	Reserve	14. Peter Wynn
15. Max Krillich	Reserve	17. Gary Martine
18. Ian Thomson	Reserve	19. Mark Laurie
	Reserve	19. Steve Halliwell
Ray Ritchie	Coach	Jack Gibson

The Eels won the minor premiership with ease – eight points ahead of Manly – and breezed through the decider with the same confidence. Manly opened the scoring through Phil Blake in the opening minutes, but Parramatta replied quickly when Brett Kenny put Steve Ella over. After a quiet period, Manly collapsed in the ten minutes before half-time with Parramatta scoring three tries. The first to Eric Grothe came when Brett Kenny had shown brilliant evasive skills on the second tackle after Manly dropped the ball, the second came when a Peter Sterling bomb deflected off a Parramatta player into Kenny's arms, and the third after quick hands saw Kenny send Neil Hunt over in the corner. The Eels led 16–3 at half-time and, despite Les Boyd scoring after playing the ball forward in the 48th minute, Brett Kenny's second try in the 62nd minute sealed victory.

Parramatta 21 (Tries: Kenny 2, Ella, Grothe, Hunt. Goals: Cronin 3/5.)

Manly 8 (Tries: P Blake, Boyd. Goal: Eadie 1/2.)

== Player statistics ==
The following statistics are as of the conclusion of Round 26.

Top 5 point scorers

Points	Player	Tries	Goals	Field Goals
255	Mick Cronin	9	114	0
187	Steve Rogers	9	79	2
186	Tony Melrose	8	79	4
161	Ron Giteau	4	74	1
159	John Dorahy	6	70	1

Top 5 try scorers

Tries	Player
21	Steve Ella
18	John Ribot
17	Steve Broughton
17	Steve Morris
15	John Ferguson

Top 5 goal scorers

Goals	Player
114	Mick Cronin
79	Tony Melrose
79	Steve Rogers
74	Ron Giteau
71	Michael Eden
