= Angel Marina =

Australian rugby league footballer (born 1960)

Personal information
- Born: 29 February 1960 (age 66) Spain

Playing information
- Position: Wing
Club
Years	Team	Pld	T	G	FG	P
1982–85	Canberra Raiders	22	10	1	0	34

Angel Marina (born 29 February 1960) is an Australian former rugby league footballer.

Born in Spain, Marina moved to Australia with his family as a baby and grew up in Queanbeyan. He picked up rugby league while a pupil at the local Marist Brothers school and was a Queanbeyan Blues junior.

Marina, a winger, played his early first–grade with Queanbeyan and was a member of their Group 8 premiership team in 1981. He was a foundation player for the Canberra Raiders in 1982 and after breaking into the team mid–season finished the year with eight first–grade tries, which included two on debut against Penrith and a hat-trick to help the Raiders defeat St George. From 1983 onwards, Marina was largely restricted to reserve grade, where he topped Canberra's try–scoring in multiple seasons. He brought up his 100th game for the Raiders across the grades in 1985, becoming only the second player from the club to reach that milestone.
