= Paul Thompson (rugby league) =

Australian rugby league footballer

Personal information
- Full name: Paul Thompson
- Born: 23 January 1961 (age 64)

Playing information
- Position: Five-eighth
Club
Years	Team	Pld	T	G	FG	P
1982–84	Illawarra Steelers	35	6	0	1	24
1985	Canberra Raiders	3	0	0	0	0
	Total	38	6	0	1	24
- Source: As of 6 February 2023

Paul Thompson is an Australian former professional rugby league footballer who played in the 1980s. He played for Illawarra and Canberra in the New South Wales Rugby League (NSWRL) competition.

== Playing career ==
Thompson made his first-grade debut in round 5 of the 1982 NSWRFL season against North Sydney at the Wollongong Showground. Thompson played 15 games for Illawarra in their inaugural season scoring one try. Thompson would go on to make a total of 35 appearances for Illawarra scoring six tries. In 1985, Thompson joined Canberra and played three games.
