= Stephen Broughton =

Australian rugby league footballer

Personal information
- Born: 8 March 1957 (age 68); Sydney, Australia

Playing information
- Position: Wing
Club
Years	Team	Pld	T	G	FG	P
1978–84	Western Suburbs	77	43	1	0	156
1985	Parramatta Eels	4	0	0	0	0
	Total	81	43	1	0	156
- Source: As of 3 July 2019

Stephen Broughton (born 8 March 1957) is an Australian former professional rugby league footballer who played for Western Suburbs and Parramatta in the New South Wales Rugby League premiership competition.

== Background ==
Broughton was born in Sydney, Australia.

He attended St Joseph's College where he excelled as a middle distance runner.

== Career ==
Broughton joined the Western Suburbs club where he made his first grade debut in 1978 against Penrith at Penrith Park. He made only a handful of first grade appearances in his first three seasons until in 1982 he cemented his position on the wing. He played in nearly all games of the 1982, 1983 & 1984 NSWRL seasons.

== Sources ==
- Whiticker, Alan & Hudson, Glen (2006) The Encyclopedia of Rugby League Players, Gavin Allen Publishing, Sydney
