= Malachi Smith (rugby league) =

Australian rugby league footballer (born 2005)

Personal information
- Born: 17 March 2005 (age 21) Gosford, New South Wales, Australia
- Height: 181 cm (5 ft 11 in)
- Weight: 89 kg (14 st 0 lb)

Playing information
- Position: Hooker, Lock
Club
Years	Team	Pld	T	G	FG	P
2026–	Canberra Raiders	1	0	0	0	0
- Source: RLP

Malachi Smith (born 17 March 2005) is an Australian rugby league footballer for the Canberra Raiders in the National Rugby League (NRL).

Smith was born in Gosford and played junior rugby league for the Terrigal Sharks.

A forward, Smith joined the Raiders from the Newcastle Knights, where he had been a member of their SG Ball Cup team.

Smith had a strong season with the Raiders reserves side in 2026, playing mostly as a lock, and was named their "NSW Cup Player of the Year". His form was rewarded with a first-grade debut in the final round of the 2026 NRL season, utilised off the bench in a win over the Cowboys in Townsville. He subsequently signed a two-year extension with the Raiders, which runs until the end of 2028.
