= Gerry de la Cruz =

Australian rugby league footballer

Gerry De La Cruz
Personal information
- Full name: Gerry De La Cruz
- Born: Innisfail, Queensland, Australia

Playing information
- Position: Halfback
Club
Years	Team	Pld	T	G	FG	P
1982	Canberra Raiders	4	1	0	0	3
- Source: As of 27 February 2019

Gerry De La Cruz is an Australian former professional rugby league footballer who played in the 1980s. De La Cruz played for Canberra in the NSWRL competition. De La Cruz was a foundation player for Canberra playing in the club's first ever game.

== Background ==
De La Cruz was born in Innisfail, Queensland to a mother of Aboriginal and Sri Lankan heritage and father of Torres Strait Islander and Filipino heritage. De La Cruz spent his early life in Darwin, Northern Territory. He was the first person of Filipino ancestry to play first grade rugby league in Australia.

== Playing career ==
De La Cruz played in Canberra's first ever game which was in Round 1 1982 against South Sydney at Redfern Oval. The match finished in a 37–7 loss with De La Cruz scoring the club's first ever try described by one Sydney paper as 'a bewildering try'. De La Cruz only played four senior games for the Canberra side with injury cutting short his career. In the first season he broke his arm in a tackle against Parramatta and utility Paul Taylor, but not before he scored that groundbreaking try. A few years later, Canberra stalwart Don Furner, his former coach, paid de la Cruz the ultimate compliment. ‘If you did not break your arm you could have been anything in rugby league’. Canberra went on to finish last in their inaugural season winning only a total of 4 matches. As of 2020, this is the last time Canberra have finished last.
