= Mark Asbock =

Australian rugby league footballer

Personal information
- Born: 7 April 1977 (age 47); Queanbeyan, New South Wales, Australia

Playing information
- Position: Wing
Club
Years	Team	Pld	T	G	FG	P
1998–1999	Villefranche XIII
2002	Canberra Raiders	3	2	0	0	8
	Total	3	2	0	0	8

Mark Asbock (born 7 April 1977) is an Australian former professional rugby league footballer who played for the Canberra Raiders in the National Rugby League.

== Playing career ==
Early in his career he played in France, which is where he met his wife Angelique. Asbock, who came from Queanbeyan, made three-first grade appearances for Canberra late in the 2002 NRL season. A winger, he scored a try in each of his first two games, against North Queensland and the Warriors.
