= Mick Tilse =

Australian rugby league footballer (1958–2025)

Personal information
- Full name: Michael Tilse
- Born: 1958
- Died: 5 August 2025 (aged 67)

Playing information
- Position: Prop, Second-row
Club
Years	Team	Pld	T	G	FG	P
1980	North Sydney	4	0	0	0	0
1982	Canberra Raiders	11	0	0	0	0
	Total	15	0	0	0	0
- Source: As of 28 February 2019

Michael Tilse (1958 — 5 August 2025) was an Australian professional rugby league footballer who played in the 1980s. Tilse played for North Sydney and Canberra in the NSWRL competition. Tilse was a foundation player for Canberra playing in the club's first ever game. Tilse was the father of former Newcastle Knights and Canberra player Dane Tilse.

== Playing career ==
Tilse made his first grade debut for North Sydney in Round 15 1980 against Canterbury at Belmore Oval.

In 1982, Tilse joined newly admitted Canberra and played in the club's first ever game, a 37–7 loss against South Sydney at Redfern Oval.

Canberra would only go on to win four games in 1982 and finished last on the table claiming the wooden spoon. As of 2019, this is the only time that Canberra has finished last.

Tilse remarkably went his whole first grade career without playing in a winning match being on the losing side in all 15 of his first grade games.

== Death ==
Tilse died on 5 August 2025, at the age of 67.
