= Steve O'Callaghan =

Australian rugby league footballer

Personal information
- Full name: Steve O'Callaghan
- Born: 13 July 1959 (age 67)

Playing information
- Position: Wing, Fullback
Club
Years	Team	Pld	T	G	FG	P
1982–87	Canberra Raiders	48	7	11	0	49
- Source: As of 28 February 2019

Steve O'Callaghan is an Australian former professional rugby league footballer who played in the 1980s. O'Callaghan played for Canberra in the NSWRL competition. O'Callaghan was a foundation player for Canberra playing in the club's first ever game.

== Playing career ==
In 1982, O'Callaghan joined newly admitted Canberra and played in the club's first ever game, a 37–7 loss against South Sydney at Redfern Oval.

O'Callaghan played in the club's first win, a 12–11 victory over Newtown at Seiffert Oval with O'Callaghan kicking a goal from the sideline to win the match.

Canberra would only go on to win 4 games in 1982 and finished last on the table claiming the wooden spoon. As of 2019, this is the only time that Canberra has finished last.

O'Callaghan played with Canberra until the end of the 1987 season before retiring and was not a part of the club's maiden grand final appearance against Manly.

== Post playing ==
O'Callaghan went on to work for the Australian Federal Police in Canberra.
