= Stuart Stanton =

Australian rugby league player

Playing information
- Position: Lock
Club
Years	Team	Pld	T	G	FG	P
1984–85	Cardiff	2	0	0	0	0
1989–91	Canberra Raiders	18	0	0	0	0
	Total	20	0	0	0	0

Stuart Stanton is an Australian former rugby league player for the Canberra Raiders.

Stanton followed his elder brother Glenn and several uncles in playing grade football for Balmain. He captained Balmain in the Jersey Flegg Cup, but never progressed into first grade.

Primarily a lock, Stanton was an understudy to Bradley Clyde and came through the Raiders under-21. He featured in first grade from 1989 to 1991, which included two premiership-winning seasons.
