= Frank Roddy =

Australian rugby league footballer

Playing information
- Position: Centre
Club
Years	Team	Pld	T	G	FG	P
1982–83	Canberra Raiders	21	3	0	0	10

Frank Roddy is an Australian former rugby league footballer.

A centre, Roddy was a Queanbeyan Blues junior and got his start in first-grade with South Woden in 1974.

Roddy had three seasons in Brisbane with Eastern Suburbs at the end of the 1970s. He was a member of their 1978 premiership team. On his return south, Roddy joined Queanbeyan United. He played first-grade for the Canberra Raiders during their opening two seasons in the NSWRFL.
