= Jason Burnham (rugby league) =

Australian rugby league footballer

Personal information
- Full name: Jason Burnham
- Born: 13 January 1972 (age 54)

Playing information
- Position: Hooker, Lock, Five-eighth
Club
Years	Team	Pld	T	G	FG	P
1994–00	Canberra	60	2	0	0	8
- Source: As of 30 January 2023

Jason Burnham is an Australian former professional rugby league footballer who played in the 1990s and 2000s. He played for Canberra in the NSWRL/ARL/Super League and NRL competitions.

== Playing career ==
Burnham made his first grade debut for Canberra in round 7 of the 1994 NSWRL season against Manly at Bruce Stadium. Burnham played three games for Canberra that season as the club won their third premiership. Over the next two years, Burnham played mostly from the interchange bench and struggled to break into the starting side. In 1996, Burnham got to experience finals football for the first time as he was called in the Canberra team for their qualifying final against St. George which Canberra lost 16-14.

In 1997, Canberra joined the rival Super League competition for its one and only season. Burnham played 20 matches for Canberra as they reached the preliminary final where they lost 10-4 against Cronulla. This would be the last time Canberra would make a preliminary final until the 2016 NRL season. Over the next three years, Burnham would only make 20 appearances for Canberra and he was released at the end of the 2000 NRL season.
