= Lui Bon =

Australian rugby league footballer

Playing information
- Position: Second-row
Club
Years	Team	Pld	T	G	FG	P
1982	Canberra Raiders	1	0	0	0	0

Lui Bon is an Australian former rugby league footballer for the Canberra Raiders.

An Indigenous Australian from Thursday Island, Bon was a second-rower who played his early rugby league in North Queensland. He came down to Canberra in 1981 after being scouted while playing for the Cairns Kangaroos.

Bon spent the 1981 season with the Queanbeyan Blues, which qualified him as a local player for Canberra's inaugural NSWRFL season in 1982. Due to a broken leg, Bon didn't get a first-grade opportunity until the final round of the season, against Eastern Suburbs in Queanbeyan.
