= Scott Dudman =

Australian rugby league footballer

Personal information
- Born: 28 November 1957 (age 67)

Playing information
- Height: 182 cm (6 ft 0 in)
- Weight: 83 kg (13 st 1 lb)
- Position: Lock, Second-row
Club
Years	Team	Pld	T	G	FG	P
1978–81	Cronulla Sharks	23	1	0	0	3
1982–83	Canberra Raiders	20	2	4	0	14
	Total	43	3	4	0	17

Scott Dudman (born 28 November 1957) is an Australian former professional rugby league footballer who played for the Cronulla Sharks and the Canberra Raiders in the New South Wales Rugby Football League (NSWRFL).

Dudman, a local Cronulla junior, made his first-grade debut for the Sharks in 1978. Playing as a lock, he had established a place in the team before suffering a knee injury which ruled him out of contention for the finals and ultimately a grand final. He made only 13 more first-grade appearances over the next three seasons and was then signed by Canberra for the club's inaugural NSWRFL season in 1982.

At the Raiders he played his early first-grade games off the bench, before breaking into the starting side as a second rower. He featured in a total of 20 NSWRFL games for the Raiders over two seasons.
