= Jon Hardy (rugby league) =

Australian rugby league player (born 1956)

Personal information
- Full name: Jonathan Hardy
- Born: 1 August 1956 (age 69); Newcastle, New South Wales Australia

Playing information
- Position: Second-row, Prop, Lock
Club
Years	Team	Pld	T	G	FG	P
1982–85	Canberra Raiders	54	0	0	0	0

Jon Hardy (born 1 August 1956) is an Australian former professional rugby league player who played for the Canberra Raiders in the New South Wales Rugby Football League (NSWRFL). He played as either a prop or second-row.

== Biography ==
Born in Newcastle, but raised in Canberra. Hardy had a background in rugby union, but played rugby league with the Queanbeyan Blues under Don Furner for several seasons before joining the Raiders in his late 20s. He was regarded as a fitness fanatic and had a high tackle rate.

Hardy was one of Canberra's second rowers in the club's first ever premiership season in 1982, where he featured in all 26 first-grade games, which made him the only player to play every game of the season. Canberra would only go on to win 4 games in 1982 and finished last on the table claiming the wooden spoon. As of 2025, this remains the only time that Canberra has ever finished last.

Hardy stayed with the Raiders club until the end of the 1985 season. In total, Hardy played 54 games, and finished his career without ever scoring a try.
