= Matthew Wood (rugby league) =

Australian rugby league footballer

Personal information
- Full name: Matthew Wood
- Born: 15 March 1969 (age 56); Queanbeyan, New South Wales, Australia]

Playing information
- Position: Wing, Centre
Club
Years	Team	Pld	T	G	FG	P
1989–96	Canberra Raiders	74	23	38	0	168

Matthew Wood (born 15 March 1969) is an Australian former rugby league footballer who played in the 1980s and 1990s. He played his entire club football career with the Canberra Raiders

Wood was a Canberra junior playing S.G. Ball Cup in 1987, Jersey Flegg Cup in 1988, and was graded from the Queanbeyan Kangaroos in 1988. He played eight seasons with Canberra Raiders from 1989 to 1996.

He won two premierships with the Canberra Raiders in 1989 and 1990. He scored the match winning try in Canberra's grand final win over the Penrith Panthers in 1990. Wood also scored two tries and a goal when the Raiders lost to the Panthers in the grand final the following year. Wood's stint with the Raiders ended at the conclusion of the 1996 season.

In 2010, Wood coached the Brisbane Broncos NRL Under-20s side.
