= Chris O'Sullivan (rugby league) =

Australian RL coach and former rugby league footballer

Personal information
- Full name: Christopher Mark O'Sullivan
- Born: 23 September 1959 (age 66) Canberra, A.C.T, Australia

Playing information
- Position: Five-eighth
Club
| Years | Team | Pld | T | G | FG | P |
|---|---|---|---|---|---|---|
| 1982–92 | Canberra Raiders | 202 | 63 | 13 | 10 | 276 |
| 1988–89 | Oldham | 22 | 5 | 1 | 4 | 26 |
| 1990–91 | Warrington | 28 | 3 | 0 | 2 | 14 |
| 1991–92 | Swinton | 11 | 1 | 0 | 1 | 5 |
| | Total | 263 | 72 | 14 | 17 | 321 |

Coaching information
Club
| Years | Team | Gms | W | D | L | W% |
| 1991 | Swinton | 11 | 2 | 0 | 9 | 18 |

Chris O'Sullivan (born 23 September 1959) is an Australian former professional rugby league footballer who played in the 1980s and 1990s, and coached in the 1990s. O'Sullivan played for the Canberra Raiders (winning the 1989 and 1990 Grand Finals). O'Sullivan's position of choice was five-eighth.

== Playing career ==
=== Juniors ===
O'Sullivan played juniors for both North Canberra and East Canberra before being graded with Lakes United at age 17. O'Sullivan then joined the Canberra Gallopers, a team formed by his father and supported by the Canberra Racing Club.

=== Cronulla-Sutherland Sharks ===
O'Sullivan trialed with the Cronulla-Sutherland Sharks for the 1981 season, but he was suspended for two matches for a head-high tackle whilst playing in a trial match during the 1981 pre-season and missed being graded by the Cronulla club.

=== Canberra Raiders ===
O'Sullivan made his first grade début for the Canberra Raiders in the club's inaugural season of 1982. Although he started the season in reserve grade, he finished the year as the Raiders' leading try-scorer with 12 tries.

In 1987, he played in the club's maiden Grand Final appearance against the Manly-Warringah Sea Eagles, he showed his quick thinking when he feigned injury close to the try line before miraculously springing to his feet to back up and score the Raiders' only try in the match. The Raiders were defeated 18-8 in front of 50,201 in what was the last Grand Final played at the Sydney Cricket Ground.

=== Oldham RLFC ===
O'Sullivan played for English side Oldham in the 1988–89 English season scoring three tries, and kicking four field goals.

=== Canberra Raiders 2 ===
Back in Australia in 1989, O'Sullivan was part of the Raiders' 19-14 Grand Final victory over the Balmain Tigers in which he helped his side's fightback by setting up a dramatic last-minute try by kicking a well placed cross-field bomb on the final tackle in which the Balmain side would fumble, Canberra's Laurie Daley would pick up the loose ball and pass it to the unmarked Canberra wing John Ferguson who would dart and weave his way infield to score under the posts, sending the Grand Final into extra-time for the first time in history. O'Sullivan also kicked the vital field goal which gave the Raiders a 15-14 lead in extra-time. He traveled with the Raiders to England in the post-season for the 1989 World Club Challenge playing five-eighth in Canberra's 30-18 loss to Widnes at the Old Trafford stadium in Manchester.

More success followed O'Sullivan in 1990. He was a member of the Raiders' team in their successful 18-14 win over the Penrith Panthers in the 1990 Grand Final.

=== Warrington ===
After the 1990 NSWRL season ended, O'Sullivan once again traveled to England, this time playing for Warrington in the 1990-91 English season scoring three tries.

=== Swinton ===
O'Sullivan did not take part in the Raiders' 1991 NSWRL season campaign instead choosing to stay in England to play for Swinton in the upcoming 1991-92 English season.

=== Canberra Raiders 3 ===
In 1992, O'Sullivan returned to the Raiders in what was a troubled season in which they only won 10 games. After making only six appearances in the 1992 NSWRL season, O'Sullivan decided to retire at season's end. With 202 appearances, he held the record for most appearances with the Raiders until Steve Walters surpassed him in the 1995 season. O'Sullivan is currently ranked 11th on the Raiders' list for most appearances behind Jason Croker (318), Jarrod Croker (307), Josh Papalii (282), Laurie Daley (244), Jack Wighton (242), Simon Woolford (234), Steve Walters (228), Ruben Wiki, (224), Alan Tongue (220), and Ricky Stuart (203).

== Post playing ==
In 2006, O'Sullivan was picked in the Raiders' 25-man "Dream Team" picked in the Canberra Times to commemorate the club's 25th season in 2006.
