= Roger Kenworthy =

Australian rugby league footballer

Personal information
- Full name: Roger Kenworthy
- Born: 14 January 1971 (age 54)

Playing information
- Position: Fullback, Wing, Scrum-half
Club
Years	Team	Pld	T	G	FG	P
1989–96	Canberra Raiders	14	0	0	0	0
1997–98	Wakefield Trinity	49	22	0	0	88
	Total	63	22	0	0	88

Roger Kenworthy (born 14 January 1971) is an Australian former professional rugby league footballer who played in the 1980s and 1990s. He played at club level for the Canberra Raiders and Wakefield Trinity, as a fullback, wing or halfback.

== Playing career ==
Kenworthy made his début for Wakefield Trinity during February 1997, he played his last match for Wakefield Trinity during the 1998 season.

=== First Division Grand Final appearances ===
Roger Kenworthy played scrum-half in Wakefield Trinity's 24–22 victory over Featherstone Rovers in the 1998 First Division Grand Final at McAlpine Stadium, Huddersfield on 26 September 1998.
