= Jason Gregory =

Australian rugby league footballer (born 1970)

Personal information
- Born: 1 March 1970 (age 56)

Playing information
- Position: Halfback
Club
Years	Team	Pld	T	G	FG	P
1991	Canberra Raiders	8	0	0	0	0
1992	Gold Coast Seagulls	0	0	0	0	0
	Total	8	0	0	0	0

Jason Gregory (born 1 March 1970) is an Australian former rugby league footballer.

Gregory attended Hawker College in Canberra and was originally an Australian rules footballer, until a broken back forced him to give up the sport in 1987. He switched to rugby league and earned Australian Schoolboys representative honours. In 1989, Gregory was a five–eighth in the Canberra Raiders side which went undefeated in the Jersey Flegg competition. He played first–grade for the Raiders in 1991, appearing mostly off the bench.

With Ricky Stuart entrenched as Raiders halfback, Gregory moved to the Gold Coast Seagulls in 1992. His time at the Gold Coast was ended by a serious neck injury suffered during his debut pre–season match.

Gregory became a team trainer for Christchurch–based netball team the Tactix, for which his wife Lisa played.
