= Bob Cooper (rugby league) =

Australian professional footballer (1955–2022)

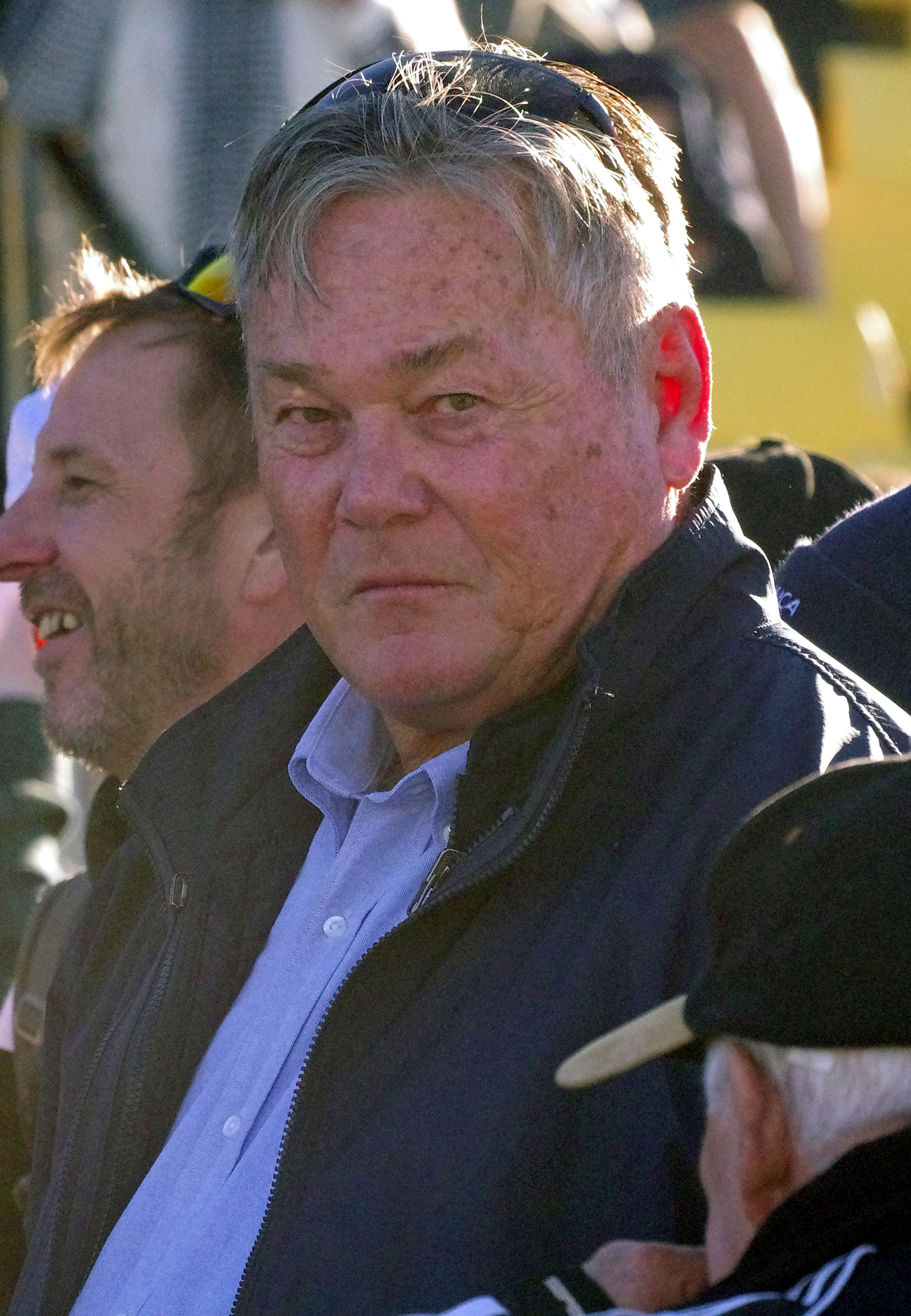

Personal information
- Full name: Robert Cooper
- Born: 31 August 1955 Sydney, New South Wales, Australia
- Died: 9 December 2022 (aged 67)

Playing information
- Height: 196 cm (6 ft 5 in)
- Position: Second-row
Club
Years	Team	Pld	T	G	FG	P
1977–82	Wests Magpies	76	14	0	0	42
1984	North Sydney Bears	4	0	0	0	0
	Total	80	14	0	0	42
Representative
Years	Team	Pld	T	G	FG	P
1980	New South Wales	1	0	0	0	0

Robert Cooper (31 August 1955 – 9 December 2022) was an Australian professional footballer. He played rugby league in the New South Wales Rugby League. In 1982, Cooper was suspended for the equal-longest period in rugby league history.

Cooper played rugby league for Western Suburbs Magpies and North Sydney Bears and, in 1980, was selected in the New South Wales team for the inaugural game in the State of Origin. He played primarily in the back row. Cooper was named in the Western Suburbs Magpies Team of the Eighties, in the second-row.

In 1982, Cooper was suspended for the equal-longest period in rugby league history, of fifteen months, after he ran in to join a brawl and left three Illawarra Steelers players flattened during a match at Wollongong showground. When imposing the suspension, the NSW Rugby League judiciary chairman, Jim Comans said, "Acts such as these must be obliterated from the game, and I'll begin by obliterating you."

In 1983, Cooper played Australian rules football with St George in the Sydney Football League and won the reserve competition's best and fairest award.

In 1984, Cooper returned to the NSW Rugby League with North Sydney but, after only four games, he dislocated his shoulder and retired from football.

Cooper died from cancer on 9 December 2022, at the age of 67.
