= Phil Carey (rugby league) =

Australian rugby league footballer

Personal information
- Full name: Philip Carey
- Born: 28 August 1960 (age 65) Port Macquarie, New South Wales, Australia

Playing information
- Position: Wing, Centre
Club
Years	Team	Pld	T	G	FG	P
1982–84	Manly Sea Eagles	39	12	0	0	44
1985–91	Canberra Raiders	89	21	6	0	96
1988–89	Featherstone Rovers	25	5	0	0	20
	Total	153	38	6	0	160
Representative
Years	Team	Pld	T	G	FG	P
1981	NSW Country	1	1	0	0	3
- Source: As of 9 April 2019

Phil Carey (born 28 August 1960) is an Australian former professional rugby league footballer who played in the 1980s and 1990s. He played for the Canberra Raiders, Manly-Warringah and Featherstone Rovers.

== Background ==
Carey played his junior rugby league for Macquarie United before signing with Manly-Warringah.

== Playing career ==
Carey made his first grade debut for Manly in Round 10 1982 against Balmain at Brookvale Oval. Carey made a total of 13 appearances for Manly in 1982 as the club reached the grand final against Parramatta. Carey played on the wing in the final as Manly were defeated 21-8.

In 1983, injuries meant that Carey missed most of the season and was not selected to play in the 1983 grand final against Parramatta which Manly lost 18-6. At the end of 1984, Carey departed Manly and joined Canberra. Carey went on to establish himself as a regular starter in the side and by 1987 the club had reached its first grand final against Manly. Carey had played in the semi-final victory over South Sydney but was not selected to play in the final which Canberra lost.

In 1989, Carey made 13 appearances but was not selected to play in Canberra's maiden premiership victory against Balmain. Between 1988 and 1989, Carey had a stint in England with Featherstone Rovers. In 1990, Canberra reached their second consecutive grand final against the Penrith Panthers. Carey played from the bench as Canberra won the premiership 18-14 at the Sydney Football Stadium.

Carey played the following season in 1991 but was not selected to play in Canberra's 1991 grand final loss against Penrith. He retired from rugby league following the conclusion of that season.
