= 1988 Panasonic Cup =

1988 NSWRL Midweek Cup
NSWRL Panasonic Cup

Tournament details
- Dates: 17 February - 25 May 1988
- Teams: 19
- Venue: 8 (in 7 host cities)

Final positions
- Champions: St. George (1st title)
- Runners-up: Balmain

Tournament statistics
- Matches played: 18

The 1988 Panasonic Cup was the 15th edition of the NSWRL Midweek Cup, a NSWRL-organised national club Rugby League tournament between the leading clubs and representative teams from the NSWRL, the BRL, the CRL and Papua New Guinea.

A total of 19 teams from across Australia and Papua New Guinea played 18 matches in a straight knock-out format, with the matches being held midweek during the premiership season.

== Qualified teams ==
Team	Nickname	League	Qualification	Participation (bold indicates winners)
Enter in Round 1
Manly-Warringah	Sea Eagles	NSWRL	Winners of the 1987 New South Wales Rugby League Premiership	15th (Previous: 1974, 1975, 1976, 1977, 1978, 1979, 1980, 1981, **1982**, **1983**, 1984, 1985, 1986, 1987)
Canberra	Raiders	NSWRL	Runners-up in the 1987 New South Wales Rugby League Premiership	7th (Previous: 1982, 1983, 1984, 1985, 1986, 1987)
Eastern Suburbs	Roosters	NSWRL	Third Place in the 1987 New South Wales Rugby League Premiership	15th (Previous: 1974, **1975**, 1976, 1977, **1978**, 1979, 1980, 1981, 1982, 1983, 1984, 1985, 1986, 1987)
South Sydney	Rabbitohs	NSWRL	Fourth Place in the 1987 New South Wales Rugby League Premiership	15th (Previous: 1974, 1975, 1976, 1977, 1978, 1979, 1980, **1981**, 1982, 1983, 1984, 1985, 1986, 1987)
Balmain	Tigers	NSWRL	Fifth Place in the 1987 New South Wales Rugby League Premiership	15th (Previous: 1974, 1975, **1976**, 1977, 1978, 1979, 1980, 1981, 1982, 1983, 1984, **1985**, 1986, **1987**)
Canterbury-Bankstown	Bulldogs	NSWRL	Sixth Place in the 1987 New South Wales Rugby League Premiership	15th (Previous: 1974, 1975, 1976, 1977, 1978, 1979, 1980, 1981, 1982, 1983, 1984, 1985, 1986, 1987)
Parramatta	Eels	NSWRL	Seventh Place in the 1987 New South Wales Rugby League Premiership	15th (Previous: 1974, 1975, 1976, 1977, 1978, 1979, **1980**, 1981, 1982, 1983, 1984, 1985, **1986**, 1987)
Cronulla-Sutherland	Sharks	NSWRL	Eighth Place in the 1987 New South Wales Rugby League Premiership	15th (Previous: 1974, 1975, 1976, 1977, 1978, **1979**, 1980, 1981, 1982, 1983, 1984, 1985, 1986, 1987)
St. George	Dragons	NSWRL	Ninth Place in the 1987 New South Wales Rugby League Premiership	15th (Previous: 1974, 1975, 1976, 1977, 1978, 1979, 1980, 1981, 1982, 1983, 1984, 1985, 1986, 1987)
North Sydney	Bears	NSWRL	Tenth Place in the 1987 New South Wales Rugby League Premiership	15th (Previous: 1974, 1975, 1976, 1977, 1978, 1979, 1980, 1981, 1982, 1983, 1984, 1985, 1986, 1987)
Illawarra	Steelers	NSWRL	Eleventh Place in the 1987 New South Wales Rugby League Premiership	7th (Previous: 1982, 1983, 1984, 1985, 1986, 1987)
Penrith	Panthers	NSWRL	Twelfth Place in the 1987 New South Wales Rugby League Premiership	15th (Previous: 1974, 1975, 1976, 1977, 1978, 1979, 1980, 1981, 1982, 1983, 1984, 1985, 1986, 1987)
Western Suburbs	Magpies	NSWRL	Thirteenth Place in the 1987 New South Wales Rugby League Premiership	15th (Previous: 1974, 1975, 1976, **1977**, 1978, 1979, 1980, 1981, 1982, 1983, 1984, 1985, 1986, 1987)
Brisbane	Broncos	NSWRL	NSWRL Expansion Team	1st
Gold Coast-Tweed	Giants	NSWRL	NSWRL Expansion Team	1st
Enter in Preliminary round
Newcastle	Knights	NSWRL	NSWRL Expansion Team	1st
Brisbane	Poinsettias	BRL	League Representative Team	10th (Previous: 1979, 1980, 1981, 1982, 1983, **1984**, 1985, 1986, 1987)
NSW Country	Kangaroos	CRL	Country League Representative Team	10th (Previous: 1979, 1980, 1981, 1982, 1983, 1984, 1985, 1986, 1987)
Port Moresby	Vipers	PNGRFL	League Representative Team	3rd (Previous: 1986, 1987)

== Venues ==
Sydney		Tamworth	Tweed Heads	Wagga Wagga	Brisbane	Newcastle	Goroka
Parramatta Stadium	Belmore Sports Ground	Scully Park	Chris Cunningham Field	Eric Weissel Oval	Lang Park	Newcastle International Sports Centre	Danny Leahy Oval
Capacity: 28,000	Capacity: 28,000	Capacity: 13,000	Capacity: 13,500	Capacity: 10,000	Capacity: 45,000	Capacity: 33,000	Capacity: 10,000

== Preliminary round ==
Date	Winner	Score	Loser	Score	Venue	Man of the Match
22/03/88	NSW Country (Carney, Wishart, Stammers, Campbell tries, Wishart 2, Mehmet, Elwin goals, Hastings field goal)	25	Port Moresby (PNG)	0	Danny Leahy Oval	
25/03/88	Combined Brisbane (Neal, Holmes tries)	8	NSW Country	0	Lang Park	
30/03/88	Newcastle (Kemp 2, Stewart, Butterfield, Fulmer tries, Tew 3 goals)	26	Combined Brisbane	0	Newcastle ISC	Tony Townsend - Newcastle

== Round 1 ==
Date	Winner	Score	Loser	Score	Venue	Man of the Match
17/02/88	St George (Wynn, Johnston tries, Waite goal)	10	Parramatta (Charmers try, Garnon goal)	6	Belmore Sports Ground	Peter Gill - St George
24/02/88	Cronulla-Sutherland (Docking try, Watson 2 goals)	8	Canterbury-Bankstown (Campbell try, Lamb field goal)	5	Parramatta Stadium	Michael Porter - Cronulla-Sutherland
28/02/88	Eastern Suburbs (Bridge, Williams 2, Wurth, Dart, Spina, French tries, Melrose, Papworth goals)	36	Western Suburbs (Peacock, Howcroft tries, Tronc 2, Schubert, Rawlings goals)	16	Eric Weissel Oval	Gary Bridge - Eastern Suburbs
2/03/88	South Sydney (I.Roberts, Mavin, Ellison, Blake tries, Ellison 5, Djura goals, Ellison field goal)	29	Canberra (Coyne try, Belcher 3 goals)	10	Parramatta Stadium	Ian Roberts - South Sydney
9/03/88	North Sydney (Friend, Vincent tries, Dorahy 2 goals)	12	Gold Coast (Eden 3 goals)	6	Chris Cunningham Field	Clayton Friend - North Sydney
16/03/88	Balmain (Pobjie, Neil tries, Conlon 2 goals)	12	Illawarra (Upfield, Carney tries, Carney goal)	10	Parramatta Stadium	Paul Upfield - Illawarra
6/04/88	Penrith (Cartwright, Alexander, Izzard, McNeill tries, McNeill 4 goals)	24	Brisbane (Dowling, Hancock tries, Matterson goal)	10	Parramatta Stadium	Greg Alexander - Penrith
13/04/88	Newcastle (Miller, Hanrahan, Kemp tries, McKiernan 3 goals)	18	Manly-Warringah (Dwyer goal)	2	Parramatta Stadium	Brett Shore - Newcastle

== Quarter finals ==
Date	Winner	Score	Loser	Score	Venue	Man of the Match
23/03/88	South Sydney (O'Neill try, Ellison goal)	6	Cronulla-Sutherland (Wilson goal)	2	Parramatta Stadium	Adam O'Neill - South Sydney
20/04/88	St George (Robinson, Walford tries, Walford 3 goals)	14	Penrith (Gerard try, Baker 2 goals)	8	Parramatta Stadium	Steve Robinson - St George
27/04/88	Eastern Suburbs (McLean, Trewhella, Gillmeister tries, Smith 2 goals)	16	Newcastle (Kemp try, McKiernan goal)	6	Parramatta Stadium	David Trewhella - Eastern Suburbs
27/04/88	Balmain (Parish, Robinson, Conlon tries, Conlon goal)	14	North Sydney (Florimo try, Dorahy 3 goals)	10	Parramatta Stadium	Garry Jack - Balmain

== Semi finals ==
Date	Winner	Score	Loser	Score	Venue	Man of the Match
4/05/88	Balmain (Robinson, Parish, McGuire tries, Conlon 3 goals, Elias field goal)	19	South Sydney (Blake try)	4	Scully Park	Bruce McGuire - Balmain
18/05/88	St George (Selby, Wynn, Beattie tries, Walford 3 goals)	18	Eastern Suburbs (McGahan try, Smith 5 goals)	14	Parramatta Stadium	Brett Clark - St George

== Final ==
Date	Winner	Score	Loser	Score	Venue	Man of the Match
25 May 1988	St George (Robinson, Gordon, Walford tries, Walford 2 goals)	16	Balmain (Moss try, Conlon 2 goals)	8	Parramatta Stadium	Peter Gill - St George

== Teams ==
St. George : 1. Clinton Mohr, 2. Bert Gordon, 3. Brian Johnston, 4. Michael Beattie, 5. Ricky Walford, 6. Steve Robinson, 7. Brett Clark, 8. Peter Gill, 9. Graeme Wynn, 10. Wally Fullerton-Smith, 11. Craig Young, 12. Trevor Bailey, 13. Paul Osborne Reserves 14. Darren Higgins, 15. Colin Fraser, 16. Geoff Selby, 17. Mark Blackburn. Coach: Ted Glossop.

Balmain : 1. Garry Jack, 2. Clint Robinson, 3. Russel Gartner, 4. Matt Parish, 5. John Davidson, 6. Ross Conlon, 7. Michael Neil, 8. Wayne Pearce, 9. David Brooks, 10. Paul Sironen, 11. Steve Roach, 12. Ben Elias, 13. Bruce McGuire Reserves 14. Michael Moss, 15. Peter Camroux, 16. Kevin Hardwick, 17. Steve Edmed. Coach: Warren Ryan.

=== Player of the Series ===
- Peter Gill (St. George)

=== Golden Try ===
- Sandy Campbell (Canterbury-Bankstown)

== Sources ==
- http://users.hunterlink.net.au/~maajjs/aus/nsw/sum/nsw1988.htm
