= 1987 National Panasonic Cup =

1987 NSWRL Midweek Cup
NSWRL National Panasonic Cup

Tournament details
- Dates: 4 March - 10 June 1987
- Teams: 20
- Venue(s): 8 (in 6 host cities)

Final positions
- Champions: Balmain (3rd title)
- Runners-up: Penrith

Tournament statistics
- Matches played: 19

The 1987 National Panasonic Cup was the 14th edition of the NSWRL Midweek Cup, a NSWRL-organised national club Rugby League tournament between the leading clubs from the NSWRL, the BRL, the CRL, Papua New Guinea and State Representative Teams.

A total of 20 teams from across Australia and Papua New Guinea played 19 matches in a straight knock-out format, with the matches being held midweek during the premiership season.

== Qualified teams ==
Team	Nickname	League	Qualification	Participation (bold indicates winners)
Enter in Round 1
Parramatta	Eels	NSWRL	Winners of the 1986 New South Wales Rugby League Premiership	14th (Previous: 1974, 1975, 1976, 1977, 1978, 1979, **1980**, 1981, 1982, 1983, 1984, 1985, **1986**)
Canterbury-Bankstown	Bulldogs	NSWRL	Runners-Up in the 1986 New South Wales Rugby League Premiership	14th (Previous: 1974, 1975, 1976, 1977, 1978, 1979, 1980, 1981, 1982, 1983, 1984, 1985, 1986)
Balmain	Tigers	NSWRL	Third Place in the 1986 New South Wales Rugby League Premiership	14th (Previous: 1974, 1975, **1976**, 1977, 1978, 1979, 1980, 1981, 1982, 1983, 1984, **1985**, 1986)
South Sydney	Rabbitohs	NSWRL	Fourth Place in the 1986 New South Wales Rugby League Premiership	14th (Previous: 1974, 1975, 1976, 1977, 1978, 1979, 1980, **1981**, 1982, 1983, 1984, 1985, 1986)
Manly-Warringah	Sea Eagles	NSWRL	Fifth Place in the 1986 New South Wales Rugby League Premiership	14th (Previous: 1974, 1975, 1976, 1977, 1978, 1979, 1980, 1981, **1982**, **1983**, 1984, 1985, 1986)
North Sydney	Bears	NSWRL	Sixth Place in the 1986 New South Wales Rugby League Premiership	14th (Previous: 1974, 1975, 1976, 1977, 1978, 1979, 1980, 1981, 1982, 1983, 1984, 1985, 1986)
St. George	Dragons	NSWRL	Seventh Place in the 1986 New South Wales Rugby League Premiership	14th (Previous: 1974, 1975, 1976, 1977, 1978, 1979, 1980, 1981, 1982, 1983, 1984, 1985, 1986)
Penrith	Panthers	NSWRL	Eighth Place in the 1986 New South Wales Rugby League Premiership	14th (Previous: 1974, 1975, 1976, 1977, 1978, 1979, 1980, 1981, 1982, 1983, 1984, 1985, 1986)
Eastern Suburbs	Roosters	NSWRL	Ninth Place in the 1986 New South Wales Rugby League Premiership	14th (Previous: 1974, **1975**, 1976, 1977, **1978**, 1979, 1980, 1981, 1982, 1983, 1984, 1985, 1986)
Cronulla-Sutherland	Sharks	NSWRL	Tenth Place in the 1986 New South Wales Rugby League Premiership	14th (Previous: 1974, 1975, 1976, 1977, 1978, **1979**, 1980, 1981, 1982, 1983, 1984, 1985, 1986)
Canberra	Raiders	NSWRL	Eleventh Place in the 1986 New South Wales Rugby League Premiership	6th (Previous: 1982, 1983, 1984, 1985, 1986)
Western Suburbs	Magpies	NSWRL	Twelfth Place in the 1986 New South Wales Rugby League Premiership	14th (Previous: 1974, 1975, 1976, **1977**, 1978, 1979, 1980, 1981, 1982, 1983, 1984, 1985, 1986)
Illawarra	Steelers	NSWRL	Thirteenth Place in the 1986 New South Wales Rugby League Premiership	6th (Previous: 1982, 1983, 1984, 1985, 1986)
Brisbane	Poinsettias	BRL	League Representative Team	9th (Previous: 1979, 1980, 1981, 1982, 1983, **1984**, 1985, 1986)
NSW Country	Kangaroos	CRL	Country League Representative Team	9th (Previous: 1979, 1980, 1981, 1982, 1983, 1984, 1985, 1986)
Enter in Preliminary round
Port Moresby	Vipers	PNGRFL	League Representative Team	2nd (Previous: 1986)
Western Australia	Black Swans	WARL	State Representative Team	4th (Previous: 1977, 1978, 1986)
Northern Territory	Bulls	NTRL	State Representative Team	4th (Previous: 1976, 1977, 1978)
Victoria	Thunderbolts	VRL	State Representative Team	1st
South Australia	Croweaters	SARL	State Representative Team	1st

== Venues ==
Sydney			Tamworth	Bathurst	Tweed Heads	Perth	Goroka
Leichhardt Oval	Parramatta Stadium	Belmore Sports Ground	Scully Park	Carrington Park	Chris Cunningham Field	Lathlain Park	Danny Leahy Oval
Capacity: 23,000	Capacity: 28,000	Capacity: 28,000	Capacity: 13,000	Capacity: 12,000	Capacity: 13,500	Capacity: 20,000	Capacity: 10,000

== Preliminary rounds ==
Date	Winner	Score	Loser	Score	Venue
5/04/87	Western Australia	18	South Australia	14	Perth
12/04/87	Western Australia	28	Victoria	10	Perth
12/04/87	Port Moresby (PNG)	52	Northern Territory	5	Danny Leahy Oval
19/04/87	Port Moresby (PNG)	50	Western Australia	10	Danny Leahy Oval

== Round 1 ==
Date	Winner	Score	Loser	Score	Venue	Man of the Match
4/03/87	Canterbury-Bankstown (Bennett, Hagan, O’Brien, Bugden tries, Farrar 3 goals)	22	Manly-Warringah (Davis try)	4	Leichhardt Oval	David Gillespie - Canterbury-Bankstown
11/03/87	North Sydney (Friend, Lennon 2, Graham tries, McArthur 2 goals)	24	Western Suburbs (Davis try, Naden goal)	6	Leichhardt Oval	Mark Graham - North Sydney
18/03/87	Parramatta (Eden, Jackson, Sharp tries, Eden 6 goals, Muggleton field goal)	25	Illawarra (Carney, Upfield tries, Carney 4 goals)	16	Leichhardt Oval	Mike Eden - Parramatta
25/03/87	Cronulla-Sutherland (Docking 2, Russell tries, Stains, Wilson 2 goals)	20	Canberra (Belcher try, Meninga 2 goals)	8	Carrington Park	Jonathan Docking - Cronulla-Sutherland
1/04/87	South Sydney (Mavin, Harrington, P.Roberts, Blake tries, Baker 3 goals, Baker field goal)	23	St George (Wynn try, Quinton goal)	6	Scully Park	Craig Coleman - South Sydney
8/04/87	Penrith (Robards, Bevan, Alexander tries, Bevan goal)	14	Combined Brisbane (Hegarty goal)	2	Leichhardt Oval	Craig Izzard - Penrith
22/04/87	Balmain (Sinclair, Camroux 2, Grounds, Owens, John Davidson, Davies, Bevan, Gale, McGuire tries, Conlon 6, Elias 3 goals)	62	Port Moresby (PNG) (Saea try, Kovae 2 goals)	8	Leichhardt Oval	Bruce Sinclair - Balmain
29/04/87	Eastern Suburbs (French 3, McGahan 2, Challis, Morris, Spina, Simpkins tries, Portlock 5, Smith 4 goals)	54	NSW Country	0	Leichhardt Oval	Hugh McGahan - Eastern Suburbs

== Quarter finals ==
Date	Winner	Score	Loser	Score	Venue	Man of the Match
15/04/87	Parramatta (Crnkovich, Delroy, Laurie tries, Eden 3 goals)	18	North Sydney (I.French try)	4	Leichhardt Oval	Terry Leabeater - Parramatta
6/05/87	Balmain (John Davidson, Camroux tries, Conlon goal, Elias field goal)	11	South Sydney (Blake try, Ellison 3 goals)	10	Belmore Sports Ground	Ben Elias - Balmain
13/05/87	Eastern Suburbs (Challis, McGahan tries, Smith 2 goals)	12	Canterbury-Bankstown (P.Mortimer, Lamb tries, Lamb goal)	10	Chris Cunningham Field	Hugh McGahan - Eastern Suburbs
20/05/87	Penrith (Alexander 2 tries, Clements 3 goals)	14	Cronulla-Sutherland (Coleman try, Wilson goal)	6	Leichhardt Oval	Greg Alexander - Penrith

== Semi finals ==
Date	Winner	Score	Loser	Score	Venue	Man of the Match
27/05/87	Penrith (B.Izzard, Smith, Alexander, Geyer, Vitanza tries, Fitzhenry 6 goals)	32	Parramatta (Erickson, Kenny, Sterling, Mares tries, Muggleton 3 goals)	22	Leichhardt Oval	Greg Alexander - Penrith
3/06/87	Balmain (Hanrahan, Neil, Sironen tries, Conlon goal)	14	Eastern Suburbs (Lydon try, Smith 4 goals)	12	Belmore Sports Ground	Scott Gale - Balmain

== Final ==
1987 National Panasonic Cup Final

10 June 1987

Balmain Tigers	14 – 12	Penrith Panthers
Tries: 2 Scott Gale; Russel Gartner; Goals: 3 Ross Conlon		Tries: 2 Mark Robinson; Andrew Fitzhenry; Goals: 2 Andrew Fitzhenry

Parramatta Stadium
Attendance: 16,823
Referee: Mick Stone
Player of the Match: Ben Elias (Balmain)

=== Player of the Series ===
- Ben Elias (Balmain)

=== Golden Try ===
- Steve O'Brien (Canterbury-Bankstown)

== Sources ==
- https://web.archive.org/web/20070929092939/http://users.hunterlink.net.au/~maajjs/aus/nsw/sum/nsw1987.htm
- Rugby League Project - Port Moresby Vipers
