= 1986 National Panasonic Cup =

1986 NSWRL Midweek Cup
NSWRL National Panasonic Cup

Tournament details
- Dates: 5 March - 4 June 1986
- Teams: 17
- Venue(s): 7 (in 6 host cities)

Final positions
- Champions: Parramatta (2nd title)
- Runners-up: Balmain

Tournament statistics
- Matches played: 16

The 1986 National Panasonic Cup was the 13th edition of the NSWRL Midweek Cup, a NSWRL-organised national club Rugby League tournament between the leading clubs and representative teams from the NSWRL, the BRL, the CRL, Western Australia and Papua New Guinea.

A total of 17 teams from across Australia and Papua New Guinea played 16 matches in a straight knock-out format, with the matches being held midweek during the premiership season.

== Qualified teams ==
Team	Nickname	League	Qualification	Participation (bold indicates winners)
Enter in Round 1
Canterbury-Bankstown	Bulldogs	NSWRL	Winners of the 1985 New South Wales Rugby League Premiership	13th (Previous: 1974, 1975, 1976, 1977, 1978, 1979, 1980, 1981, 1982, 1983, 1984, 1985)
St. George	Dragons	NSWRL	Runners-Up in the 1985 New South Wales Rugby League Premiership	13th (Previous: 1974, 1975, 1976, 1977, 1978, 1979, 1980, 1981, 1982, 1983, 1984, 1985)
Parramatta	Eels	NSWRL	Third Place in the 1985 New South Wales Rugby League Premiership	13th (Previous: 1974, 1975, 1976, 1977, 1978, 1979, **1980**, 1981, 1982, 1983, 1984, 1985)
Balmain	Tigers	NSWRL	Fourth Place in the 1985 New South Wales Rugby League Premiership	13th (Previous: 1974, 1975, **1976**, 1977, 1978, 1979, 1980, 1981, 1982, 1983, 1984, **1985**)
Penrith	Panthers	NSWRL	Fifth Place in the 1985 New South Wales Rugby League Premiership	13th (Previous: 1974, 1975, 1976, 1977, 1978, 1979, 1980, 1981, 1982, 1983, 1984, 1985)
Manly-Warringah	Sea Eagles	NSWRL	Sixth Place in the 1985 New South Wales Rugby League Premiership	13th (Previous: 1974, 1975, 1976, 1977, 1978, 1979, 1980, 1981, **1982**, **1983**, 1984, 1985)
Eastern Suburbs	Roosters	NSWRL	Seventh Place in the 1985 New South Wales Rugby League Premiership	13th (Previous: 1974, **1975**, 1976, 1977, **1978**, 1979, 1980, 1981, 1982, 1983, 1984, 1985)
Cronulla-Sutherland	Sharks	NSWRL	Eighth Place in the 1985 New South Wales Rugby League Premiership	13th (Previous: 1974, 1975, 1976, 1977, 1978, **1979**, 1980, 1981, 1982, 1983, 1984, 1985)
South Sydney	Rabbitohs	NSWRL	Ninth Place in the 1985 New South Wales Rugby League Premiership	13th (Previous: 1974, 1975, 1976, 1977, 1978, 1979, 1980, **1981**, 1982, 1983, 1984, 1985)
Canberra	Raiders	NSWRL	Tenth Place in the 1985 New South Wales Rugby League Premiership	5th (Previous: 1982, 1983, 1984, 1985)
North Sydney	Bears	NSWRL	Eleventh Place in the 1985 New South Wales Rugby League Premiership	13th (Previous: 1974, 1975, 1976, 1977, 1978, 1979, 1980, 1981, 1982, 1983, 1984, 1985)
Western Suburbs	Magpies	NSWRL	Twelfth Place in the 1985 New South Wales Rugby League Premiership	13th (Previous: 1974, 1975, 1976, **1977**, 1978, 1979, 1980, 1981, 1982, 1983, 1984, 1985)
Illawarra	Steelers	NSWRL	Thirteenth Place in the 1985 New South Wales Rugby League Premiership	5th (Previous: 1982, 1983, 1984, 1985)
Brisbane	Poinsettias	BRL	League Representative Team	8th (Previous: 1979, 1980, 1981, 1982, 1983, **1984**, 1985)
NSW Country	Kangaroos	CRL	Country League Representative Team	8th (Previous: 1979, 1980, 1981, 1982, 1983, 1984, 1985)
Enter in Preliminary round
Port Moresby	Vipers	PNGRFL	League Representative Team	1st
Western Australia	Black Swans	WARL	State Representative Team	3rd (Previous: 1977, 1978)

== Venues ==
Sydney		Brisbane	Newcastle	Lismore	Bathurst	Goroka
Leichhardt Oval	Orana Park	Lang Park	Newcastle International Sports Centre	Oakes Oval	Carrington Park	Danny Leahy Oval
Capacity: 23,000	Capacity: 20,000	Capacity: 45,000	Capacity: 33,000	Capacity: 12,000	Capacity: 12,000	Capacity: 10,000

== Preliminary round ==
Date	Winner	Score	Loser	Score	Venue
13/04/86	Port Moresby	52	Western Australia	14	Danny Leahy Oval

== Round 1 ==
Date	Winner	Score	Loser	Score	Venue	Man of the Match
5/03/86	Balmain (Gartner, John Davidson, Gale, tries, Conlon 5 goals)	22	Cronulla-Sutherland (Docking, Wakefield tries, Carney 3 goals)	14	Leichhardt Oval	Mark Wakefield - Cronulla-Sutherland
12/03/86	Parramatta (Jurd, Grothe, Hunt tries, Hunt 2 goals, Sterling field goal)	17	Illawarra (Upfield try)	4	Orana Park	Peter Sterling - Parramatta
19/03/86	Canterbury-Bankstown (Lamb 2 goals, Lamb, C.Mortimer field goals)	6	South Sydney (Baker 2 goals, Baker field goal)	5	Oakes Oval	Peter Tunks - Canterbury-Bankstown
26/03/86	Canberra (Belcher 2, Coyne tries, Meninga 2 goals, Elliott field goal)	17	North Sydney (Teasdell try, Kiss goal)	6	Leichhardt Oval	Gary Belcher - Canberra
2/04/86	Western Suburbs (Naden 2, Brett Clark, Bruce Clark tries, Schubert 3 goals, Brett Clark field goal)	23	Penrith (Gonzales, Fenton tries, Alexander 2 goals)	12	Leichhardt Oval	Brett Clark - Western Suburbs
16/04/86	Manly-Warringah (Blake 2, Close, Ronson tries, Cochrane goal)	18	Combined Brisbane (Lindner, S.Lewis tries, Scott goal)	10	Lang Park	Dale Shearer - Manly-Warringah
16/04/86	Eastern Suburbs (Bennett 3, Katsogiannis, Melrose 2, Leggett, McGahan, Patterson, Hardy tries, Melrose 8 goals)	60	Port Moresby (PNG) (Numapo, Jakis, Kerekere tries, Numapo, Heni goals)	16	Lang Park	Trevor Gillmeister - Eastern Suburbs
23/04/86	St George (Selby 2, Funnell, Johnston, Haddock, Morris tries, O'Connor 6 goals)	36	NSW Country (Elwin 2 goals)	4	Carrington Park	Geoff Selby - St George

== Quarter finals ==
Date	Winner	Score	Loser	Score	Venue	Man of the Match
9/04/86	Parramatta (Ella, R.Price, Sharp tries, Ella 2 goals)	16	Canterbury-Bankstown (Folkes, Bugden tries, Lamb goal)	10	Leichhardt Oval	Ray Price - Parramatta
30/04/86	Manly-Warringah (Lyons, Cox, Blake tries, Cochrane 3 goals)	18	St George (O'Connor goal)	2	Newcastle ISC	Des Hasler - Manly-Warringah
7/05/86	Balmain (John Davidson 2, Roach, Myler tries, Conlon 2 goals)	20	Canberra ( Meninga, O'Sullivan tries, Meninga 2 goals)	12	Leichhardt Oval	Steve Roach - Balmain
14/05/86	Eastern Suburbs (Wurth, McGahan tries, Melrose 3 goals, Hastings 2 field goals)	16	Western Suburbs (Geelan try, Crooks 2 goals)	8	Leichhardt Oval	Hugh McGahan - Eastern Suburbs

== Semi finals ==
Date	Winner	Score	Loser	Score	Venue	Man of the Match
21/05/86	Parramatta (Hunt, Kenny, Laurie, Lillis tries, Hunt 3 goals, Ella field goal)	23	Manly-Warringah (Ronson try)	4	Leichhardt Oval	Brett Kenny - Parramatta
28/05/86	Balmain (Bridge, Gartner, Schofield, John Davidson tries, Conlon 4 goals, Bridge field goal)	25	Eastern Suburbs (Simpkins, Bennett tries, Melrose goal)	10	Leichhardt Oval	Paul Sironen - Balmain

== Final ==
Date	Winner	Score	Loser	Score	Venue	Man of the Match
4 June 1986	Parramatta (Kenny 2, Muggleton, Ella, Wynn, Bugden tries, Eden 4 goals)	32	Balmain (Gale, Myler, Humphreys tries, Schofield 2 goals)	16	Leichhardt Oval	Peter Sterling - Parramatta

=== Player of the Series ===
- Ray Price (Parramatta)

=== Golden Try ===
- Gary Bridge (Balmain)

== Sources ==
- https://web.archive.org/web/20070929103317/http://users.hunterlink.net.au/~maajjs/aus/nsw/sum/nsw1986.htm
