= 1985 National Panasonic Cup =

1985 NSWRL Midweek Cup
NSWRL National Panasonic Cup

Tournament details
- Dates: 6 March - 5 June 1985
- Teams: 16
- Venue(s): 6 (in 5 host cities)

Final positions
- Champions: Balmain (2nd title)
- Runners-up: Cronulla-Sutherland

Tournament statistics
- Matches played: 15

The 1985 National Panasonic Cup was the 12th edition of the NSWRL Midweek Cup, a NSWRL-organised national club Rugby League tournament between the leading clubs and representative teams from the NSWRL, the BRL, the CRL and the NZRL.

A total of 16 teams from across Australia and New Zealand played 15 matches in a straight knock-out format, with the matches being held midweek during the premiership season.

== Qualified Teams ==
Team	Nickname	League	Qualification	Participation (bold indicates winners)
Canterbury-Bankstown	Bulldogs	NSWRL	Winners of the 1984 New South Wales Rugby League Premiership	12th (Previous: 1974, 1975, 1976, 1977, 1978, 1979, 1980, 1981, 1982, 1983, 1984)
Parramatta	Eels	NSWRL	Runners-Up in the 1984 New South Wales Rugby League Premiership	12th (Previous: 1974, 1975, 1976, 1977, 1978, 1979, **1980**, 1981, 1982, 1983, 1984)
St. George	Dragons	NSWRL	Third Place in the 1984 New South Wales Rugby League Premiership	12th (Previous: 1974, 1975, 1976, 1977, 1978, 1979, 1980, 1981, 1982, 1983, 1984)
South Sydney	Rabbitohs	NSWRL	Fourth Place in the 1984 New South Wales Rugby League Premiership	12th (Previous: 1974, 1975, 1976, 1977, 1978, 1979, 1980, **1981**, 1982, 1983, 1984)
Manly-Warringah	Sea Eagles	NSWRL	Fifth Place in the 1984 New South Wales Rugby League Premiership	12th (Previous: 1974, 1975, 1976, 1977, 1978, 1979, 1980, 1981, **1982**, **1983**, 1984)
Canberra	Raiders	NSWRL	Sixth Place in the 1984 New South Wales Rugby League Premiership	4th (Previous: 1982, 1983, 1984)
Penrith	Panthers	NSWRL	Seventh Place in the 1984 New South Wales Rugby League Premiership	12th (Previous: 1974, 1975, 1976, 1977, 1978, 1979, 1980, 1981, 1982, 1983, 1984)
Illawarra	Steelers	NSWRL	Eighth Place in the 1984 New South Wales Rugby League Premiership	4th (Previous: 1982, 1983, 1984)
Balmain	Tigers	NSWRL	Ninth Place in the 1984 New South Wales Rugby League Premiership	12th (Previous: 1974, 1975, **1976**, 1977, 1978, 1979, 1980, 1981, 1982, 1983, 1984)
Cronulla-Sutherland	Sharks	NSWRL	Tenth Place in the 1984 New South Wales Rugby League Premiership	12th (Previous: 1974, 1975, 1976, 1977, 1978, **1979**, 1980, 1981, 1982, 1983, 1984)
North Sydney	Bears	NSWRL	Eleventh Place in the 1984 New South Wales Rugby League Premiership	12th (Previous: 1974, 1975, 1976, 1977, 1978, 1979, 1980, 1981, 1982, 1983, 1984)
Eastern Suburbs	Roosters	NSWRL	Twelfth Place in the 1984 New South Wales Rugby League Premiership	12th (Previous: 1974, **1975**, 1976, 1977, **1978**, 1979, 1980, 1981, 1982, 1983, 1984)
Western Suburbs	Magpies	NSWRL	Thirteenth Place in the 1984 New South Wales Rugby League Premiership	12th (Previous: 1974, 1975, 1976, **1977**, 1978, 1979, 1980, 1981, 1982, 1983, 1984)
Brisbane	Poinsettias	BRL	League Representative Team	7th (Previous: 1979, 1980, 1981, 1982, 1983, **1984**)
NSW Country	Kangaroos	CRL	Country League Representative Team	7th (Previous: 1979, 1980, 1981, 1982, 1983, 1984)
Auckland	Falcons	NZRL	Winners of the 1984 New Zealand Rugby League Inter-District Premiership	9th (Previous: 1974, 1975, 1976, 1977, 1978, 1979, 1980, 1984)

== Venues ==
Sydney		Lismore	Tamworth	Bathurst	Wagga Wagga
Leichhardt Oval	Redfern Oval	Oakes Oval	Scully Park	Carrington Park	Eric Weissel Oval
Capacity: 23,000	Capacity: 20,000	Capacity: 12,000	Capacity: 13,000	Capacity: 12,000	Capacity: 10,000

== Round 1 ==
Date	Winner	Score	Loser	Score	Venue	Man of the Match
6/03/85	Manly-Warringah (Shearer, Cleal, Brown, Close tries, Elwin 3 goals)	22	North Sydney (Teasdell, McKinnon tries, Dennis 3 goals)	12	Leichhardt Oval	Glenn Ryan - Manly-Warringah
10/03/85	St George * (Wynn, Johnston tries, P.Morris goal)	10	South Sydney (Murphy try, Baker 2 goals)	8	Redfern Oval	Craig Young - St George
13/03/85	Penrith (Alexander, Fenton, Gonzales tries, Levy 3 goals)	18	Parramatta (D.Price try, Cronin 3 goals)	10	Carrington Park	Greg Alexander - Penrith
20/03/85	Illawarra (D.Moon, Hetherington, Greenland, Mackey tries, Dorahy 3 goals)	22	Eastern Suburbs (Leggett try, Portlock 3 goals)	10	Leichhardt Oval	John Dorahy - Illawarra
27/03/85	Canterbury-Bankstown (C.Mortimer, P.Mortimer tries, C.Mortimer 3 goals, Lamb 2 field goals)	16	Canberra (Giteau 3 goals)	6	Eric Weissel Oval	Steve Mortimer - Canterbury-Bankstown
3/04/85	Western Suburbs	32	Auckland (NZ)	10	Leichhardt Oval	Leo Epifania - Western Suburbs
10/04/85	Cronulla-Sutherland (See 2, Merlo tries, Carney 6 goals)	24	NSW Country (Randall 2 goals)	4	Scully Park	
17/04/85	Balmain (Brooks 2, Gale, Elias, Marketo tries, Conlon 6 goals, Gale field goal)	33	Combined Brisbane (Boys, Dwyer tries, Ribot 4 goals)	16	Leichhardt Oval	Ben Elias - Balmain

* The St George V South Sydney game also functioned as the Charity Shield for this season.

== Quarter finals ==
Date	Winner	Score	Loser	Score	Venue	Man of the Match
17/04/85	Western Suburbs (Harrigan, T.Cogger tries, Pearce goal)	10	Penrith (Howell try, Alexander goal)	6	Leichhardt Oval	Mark Harrigan - Western Suburbs
1/05/85	Cronulla-Sutherland (Carney, D.Sorensen tries, Carney goal)	10	Canterbury-Bankstown	0	Leichhardt Oval	Mark Wakefield - Cronulla-Sutherland
8/05/85	Balmain (Elias, Gale, John Davidson tries, Conlon 4 goals)	20	St George (Linnane, O’Connor, Cannon tries, O’Connor 3 goals)	18	Leichhardt Oval	Wayne Pearce - Balmain
15/05/85	Manly-Warringah (Hegarty, Blake, Close, Hasler, Barkley tries, Melrose 5 goals)	30	Illawarra (Selby try, Dorahy goal)	6	Leichhardt Oval	Tony Melrose - Manly-Warringah

== Semi finals ==
Date	Winner	Score	Loser	Score	Venue	Man of the Match
22/05/85	Cronulla-Sutherland (Docking, Porter, K.Sorensen tries, Carney 2 goals)	16	Manly-Warringah	0	Oakes Oval	Michael Porter - Cronulla-Sutherland
29/05/85	Balmain (Gale, Schofield tries, Conlon 2 goals)	12	Western Suburbs (Wigham, Fyvie tries, Crooks goal)	10	Leichhardt Oval	Kevin Hardwick - Balmain

== Final ==
Date	Winner	Score	Loser	Score	Venue	Man of the Match
5 June 1985	Balmain (Bridge, Gartner tries, Conlon 3 goals)	14	Cronulla-Sutherland (Carney, Wakefield tries, Carney 2 goals)	12	Leichhardt Oval	Scott Gale - Balmain

=== Player of the Series ===
- Scott Gale (Balmain)

=== Golden Try ===
- Garry Jack (Balmain)

== Sources ==
- https://web.archive.org/web/20070929092832/http://users.hunterlink.net.au/~maajjs/aus/nsw/sum/nsw1985.htm
