= 1984 National Panasonic Cup =

1984 NSWRL Midweek Cup
NSWRL National Panasonic Cup

Tournament details
- Dates: 11 April - 15 August 1984
- Teams: 17
- Venue(s): 4 (in 4 host cities)

Final positions
- Champions: Brisbane (1st title)
- Runners-up: Eastern Suburbs

Tournament statistics
- Matches played: 16

The 1984 National Panasonic Cup was the 11th edition of the NSWRL Midweek Cup, a NSWRL-organised national club Rugby League tournament between the leading clubs and representative teams from the NSWRL, the BRL, the CRL, the QRL and the NZRL.

A total of 17 teams from across Australia and New Zealand played 16 matches in a straight knock-out format, with the matches being held midweek during the premiership season.

== Qualified Teams ==
Team	Nickname	League	Qualification	Participation (bold indicates winners)
Enter in Round 1
Parramatta	Eels	NSWRL	Winners of the 1983 New South Wales Rugby League Premiership	11th (Previous: 1974, 1975, 1976, 1977, 1978, 1979, **1980**, 1981, 1982, 1983)
Manly-Warringah	Sea Eagles	NSWRL	Runners-Up in the 1983 New South Wales Rugby League Premiership	11th (Previous: 1974, 1975, 1976, 1977, 1978, 1979, 1980, 1981, **1982**, **1983**)
Canterbury-Bankstown	Bulldogs	NSWRL	Third Place in the 1983 New South Wales Rugby League Premiership	11th (Previous: 1974, 1975, 1976, 1977, 1978, 1979, 1980, 1981, 1982, 1983)
St. George	Dragons	NSWRL	Fourth Place in the 1983 New South Wales Rugby League Premiership	11th (Previous: 1974, 1975, 1976, 1977, 1978, 1979, 1980, 1981, 1982, 1983)
Balmain	Tigers	NSWRL	Fifth Place in the 1983 New South Wales Rugby League Premiership	11th (Previous: 1974, 1975, **1976**, 1977, 1978, 1979, 1980, 1981, 1982, 1983)
Eastern Suburbs	Roosters	NSWRL	Sixth Place in the 1983 New South Wales Rugby League Premiership	11th (Previous: 1974, **1975**, 1976, 1977, **1978**, 1979, 1980, 1981, 1982, 1983)
North Sydney	Bears	NSWRL	Seventh Place in the 1983 New South Wales Rugby League Premiership	11th (Previous: 1974, 1975, 1976, 1977, 1978, 1979, 1980, 1981, 1982, 1983)
South Sydney	Rabbitohs	NSWRL	Eighth Place in the 1983 New South Wales Rugby League Premiership	11th (Previous: 1974, 1975, 1976, 1977, 1978, 1979, 1980, **1981**, 1982, 1983)
Cronulla-Sutherland	Sharks	NSWRL	Ninth Place in the 1983 New South Wales Rugby League Premiership	11th (Previous: 1974, 1975, 1976, 1977, 1978, **1979**, 1980, 1981, 1982, 1983)
Canberra	Raiders	NSWRL	Tenth Place in the 1983 New South Wales Rugby League Premiership	3rd (Previous: 1982, 1983)
Penrith	Panthers	NSWRL	Eleventh Place in the 1983 New South Wales Rugby League Premiership	11th (Previous: 1974, 1975, 1976, 1977, 1978, 1979, 1980, 1981, 1982, 1983)
Illawarra	Steelers	NSWRL	Twelfth Place in the 1983 New South Wales Rugby League Premiership	3rd (Previous: 1982, 1983)
Western Suburbs	Magpies	NSWRL	Fourteenth Place in the 1983 New South Wales Rugby League Premiership	11th (Previous: 1974, 1975, 1976, **1977**, 1978, 1979, 1980, 1981, 1982, 1983)
Brisbane	Poinsettias	BRL	League Representative Team	6th (Previous: 1979, 1980, 1981, 1982, 1983)
NSW Country	Kangaroos	CRL	Country League Representative Team	6th (Previous: 1979, 1980, 1981, 1982, 1983)
Enter in preliminary round
Queensland Country	Maroons	QRL	Country League Representative Team	6th (Previous: 1979, 1980, 1981, 1982, 1983)
Auckland	Falcons	NZRL	Winners of the 1983 New Zealand Rugby League Inter-District Premiership	8th (Previous: 1974, 1975, 1976, 1977, 1978, 1979, 1980)

== Venues ==
Sydney	Brisbane	Tamworth	Bathurst
Leichhardt Oval	Lang Park	Scully Park	Carrington Park
Capacity: 23,000	Capacity: 45,000	Capacity: 13,000	Capacity: 12,000

== Preliminary round ==
Date	Winner	Score	Loser	Score	Venue	Man of the Match
16/05/84	QLD Country (Gill 2, Gibson, Armstrong tries, Lindenberg 4 goals, Tew field goal)	25	Auckland (NZ) (Sinclair, Cooper, Friend tries, Lovett 3 goals)	18	Lang Park	Peter Gill - QLD Country

== Round 1 ==
Date	Winner	Score	Loser	Score	Venue	Man of the Match
11/04/84	Balmain (Roach, Hardwick tries, Brooks 2 goals)	12	Cronulla-Sutherland (Armstrong goal)	2	Leichhardt Oval	Steve Roach - Balmain
18/04/84	Penrith (Levy, B.Izzard, Connor, Burgmann tries, Levy 5 goals)	26	Illawarra (Browne, Hetherington tries, McPherson goal)	10	Leichhardt Oval	Mark Levy - Penrith
2/05/84	Combined Brisbane (Lewis, Kilroy, Belcher, Meninga tries, Meninga 4 goals, Dowling field goal)	25	South Sydney (Hardy 2 Biles tries, Baker 3 goals)	18	Lang Park	
9/05/84	NSW Country (Williams, Graham, Trudgett tries, Dennis 2 goals, ???? field goal)	17	Western Suburbs (Broughton try)	4	Carrington Park	Tony Trudgett - NSW Country
23/05/84	Canterbury-Bankstown (Lamb, Langmack, S.Mortimer, Tunks tries, Conlon 6 goals, S.Mortimer, Folkes field goals)	30	Manly-Warringah (Barkley, Boustead tries, Hegarty goal)	10	Leichhardt Oval	Peter Tunks - Canterbury-Bankstown
6/06/84	Eastern Suburbs (Eden, Beckett 2, Gale, Simpkins, Dunn, Greene tries Eden 5, Hastings goals)	44	QLD Country	0	Leichhardt Oval	Scott Gale - Eastern Suburbs
13/06/84	Parramatta (Hunt, Houghton, Sterling, Mara tries, Mara 2 goals)	20	Canberra (Corkery goal)	2	Leichhardt Oval	Peter Wynn - Parramatta
20/06/84	St George (Gearin, Morris, Fraser, Funnell tries, Gearin 3 goals)	22	North Sydney	0	Leichhardt Oval	Perry Haddock - St George

== Quarter finals ==
Date	Winner	Score	Loser	Score	Venue	Man of the Match
27/06/84	Parramatta (Ella, Kenny tries, Cronin 4 goals)	16	Penrith (Alexander try, Levy goal)	6	Leichhardt Oval	Brett Kenny - Parramatta
4/07/84	Eastern Suburbs (Hardy 2, McKellar, Greene, Gale tries, Greene 2 goals)	24	NSW Country (Maguire try)	4	Leichhardt Oval	Steve Hardy - Eastern Suburbs
11/07/84	Combined Brisbane (Scott, Ribot tries, Meninga 3 goals)	14	Canterbury-Bankstown (Johnstone try, Conlon 3 goals, Lamb field goal)	11	Lang Park	Wally Lewis - Combined Brisbane
18/07/84	St George (O’Grady 2, Johnston, Duval tries, Rogers 5 goals)	26	Balmain (Lane try, Brooks goal)	6	Scully Park	Graeme O'Grady - St George

== Semi finals ==
Date	Winner	Score	Loser	Score	Venue	Man of the Match
25/07/84	Combined Brisbane (French, Lindner tries, Meninga 3 goals)	14	Parramatta (Ella try, Cronin 4 goals)	12	Leichhardt Oval	Wally Lewis - Combined Brisbane
1/08/84	Eastern Suburbs (Leggett, Hastings, Worth tries, Eden 3 goals, Hastings 3, Gale field goals)	22	St George (Gearin try, 3 goals)	10	Leichhardt Oval	Kevin Hastings - Eastern Suburbs

== Final ==
Date	Winner	Score	Loser	Score	Venue	Man of the Match
15 August 1984	Combined Brisbane (Miles, Lewis tries, Meninga 2 goals)	12	Eastern Suburbs (Hardy try, Eden 3 goals, Hastings field goal)	11	Leichhardt Oval	Wally Lewis - Combined Brisbane

A televised night game, the final's match commentary was provided by Ray Warren and Bill Anderson.

Brisbane: 1. Colin Scott, 2. Joe Kilroy, 3. Mal Meninga, 4. Gene Miles, 5. John Ribot, 6. Wally Lewis (c), 7. Henry Foster, 8. Bob Lindner, 9. Wally Fullerton Smith, 10. Bryan Neibling, 11. Richie Poulsen, 12. Eddie Muller, 13. Greg Dowling. Reserve: 14. Tony Currie. Coach Bob McCarthy.

Eastern Suburbs: 1. Graeme Atkins, 2. Shane McKellar (c), 3. Glenn Leggett, 4. David Greene, 5. John Ferguson, 6. Mike Eden, 7. Scott Gale, 8. Kevin Hastings, 9. Mark Wheeler, 10. Terry Regan, 11. Dane Sorensen, 12. Rowland Beckett, 13. Tom Arber. Reserves: 15. Darren Finlayson, 16. Gavin Miller, 17. Steve Hardy. Coach Laurie Freier.

=== Player of the Series ===
- Wally Lewis (Combined Brisbane)

=== Golden Try ===
Mike Eden (Eastern Suburbs)

== Sources ==
- https://web.archive.org/web/20070929092927/http://users.hunterlink.net.au/~maajjs/aus/nsw/sum/nsw1984.htm
