= 1983 KB Cup =

1983 NSWRFL Midweek Cup
NSWRFL KB Cup

Tournament details
- Dates: 13 April - 10 August 1983
- Teams: 18
- Venue: 3 (in 3 host cities)

Final positions
- Champions: Manly-Warringah (2nd title)
- Runners-up: Cronulla-Sutherland

Tournament statistics
- Matches played: 17

The 1983 KB Cup was the 10th edition of the NSWRFL Midweek Cup, a NSWRFL-organised national club Rugby League tournament between the leading clubs and representative teams from the NSWRFL, the BRL, the CRL, the QRL and the NZRL.

A total of 18 teams from across Australia and New Zealand played 17 matches in a straight knock-out format, with the matches being held midweek during the premiership season.

== Qualified Teams ==
| Team | Nickname | League | Qualification | Participation (bold indicates winners) |
|---|---|---|---|---|
| Parramatta | Eels | NSWRFL | Winners of the 1982 New South Wales Rugby Football League Premiership | 10th (Previous: 1974, 1975, 1976, 1977, 1978, 1979, **1980**, 1981, 1982) |
| Manly-Warringah | Sea Eagles | NSWRFL | Runners-Up in the 1982 New South Wales Rugby Football League Premiership | 10th (Previous: 1974, 1975, 1976, 1977, 1978, 1979, 1980, 1981, **1982**) |
| Eastern Suburbs | Roosters | NSWRFL | Third Place in the 1982 New South Wales Rugby Football League Premiership | 10th (Previous: 1974, **1975**, 1976, 1977, **1978**, 1979, 1980, 1981, 1982) |
| North Sydney | Bears | NSWRFL | Fourth Place in the 1982 New South Wales Rugby Football League Premiership | 10th (Previous: 1974, 1975, 1976, 1977, 1978, 1979, 1980, 1981, 1982) |
| Western Suburbs | Magpies | NSWRFL | Fifth Place in the 1982 New South Wales Rugby Football League Premiership | 10th (Previous: 1974, 1975, 1976, **1977**, 1978, 1979, 1980, 1981, 1982) |
| South Sydney | Rabbitohs | NSWRFL | Sixth Place in the 1982 New South Wales Rugby Football League Premiership | 10th (Previous: 1974, 1975, 1976, 1977, 1978, 1979, 1980, **1981**, 1982) |
| Newtown | Jets | NSWRFL | Seventh Place in the 1982 New South Wales Rugby Football League Premiership | 10th (Previous: 1974, 1975, 1976, 1977, 1978, 1979, 1980, 1981, 1982) |
| Cronulla-Sutherland | Sharks | NSWRFL | Eighth Place in the 1982 New South Wales Rugby Football League Premiership | 10th (Previous: 1974, 1975, 1976, 1977, 1978, **1979**, 1980, 1981, 1982) |
| Canterbury-Bankstown | Bulldogs | NSWRFL | Ninth Place in the 1982 New South Wales Rugby Football League Premiership | 10th (Previous: 1974, 1975, 1976, 1977, 1978, 1979, 1980, 1981, 1982) |
| St. George | Dragons | NSWRFL | Tenth Place in the 1982 New South Wales Rugby Football League Premiership | 10th (Previous: 1974, 1975, 1976, 1977, 1978, 1979, 1980, 1981, 1982) |
| Balmain | Tigers | NSWRFL | Eleventh Place in the 1982 New South Wales Rugby Football League Premiership | 10th (Previous: 1974, 1975, **1976**, 1977, 1978, 1979, 1980, 1981, 1982) |
| Penrith | Panthers | NSWRFL | Twelfth Place in the 1982 New South Wales Rugby Football League Premiership | 10th (Previous: 1974, 1975, 1976, 1977, 1978, 1979, 1980, 1981, 1982) |
| Illawarra | Steelers | NSWRFL | Thirteenth Place in the 1982 New South Wales Rugby Football League Premiership | 2nd (Previous: 1982) |
| Canberra | Raiders | NSWRFL | Fourteenth Place in the 1982 New South Wales Rugby Football League Premiership | 2nd (Previous: 1982) |
| Brisbane | Poinsettias | BRL | League Representative Team | 5th (Previous: 1979, 1980, 1981, 1982) |
| NSW Country | Kangaroos | CRL | Country League Representative Team | 5th (Previous: 1979, 1980, 1981, 1982) |
| Queensland Country | Maroons | QRL | Country League Representative Team | 5th (Previous: 1979, 1980, 1981, 1982) |
| Central Districts | Falcons | NZRL | Winners of the 1982 New Zealand Rugby League Inter-District Premiership | 2nd (Previous: 1981) |

== Venues ==
| Sydney | Brisbane | Newcastle |
|---|---|---|
| Leichhardt Oval | Lang Park | Newcastle International Sports Centre |
| Capacity: 23,000 | Capacity: 45,000 | Capacity: 33,000 |

== Preliminary round ==
| Date | Winner | Score | Loser | Score | Venue | Man of the Match |
|---|---|---|---|---|---|---|
| 13/04/83 | Manly-Warringah (Ribot try, P.Blake field goal) | 5 | Parramatta | 0 | Leichhardt Oval | |
| 20/04/83 | Canberra (O'Callaghan 2, Keir, Spears tries, Giteau 3 goals) | 22 | Balmain (Lane 2, Lawson tries, Filipaina 4 goals) | 20 | Leichhardt Oval | Chris O'Sullivan - Canberra |

== Round 1 ==
| Date | Winner | Score | Loser | Score | Venue | Man of the Match |
|---|---|---|---|---|---|---|
| 27/04/83 | Canterbury-Bankstown (Leis, Conlon tries, Conlon 3 goals) | 14 | Penrith (Martin, Izzard tries, Marshall goal) | 10 | Newcastle ISC | Garry Hughes - Canterbury-Bankstown |
| 11/05/83 | Newtown (Doyle 5, Sigsworth, Wilson, Ellis, Bird tries, Wilson 7 goals) | 50 | Central Districts (NZ) | 0 | Leichhardt Oval | Chris Doyle - Newtown |
| 18/05/83 | Combined Brisbane | 38 | North Sydney | 18 | Lang Park | Wally Lewis - Combined Brisbane |
| 18/05/83 | Manly-Warringah | 78 | QLD Country | 4 | Lang Park | Ian Schubert - Manly-Warringah |
| 25/05/83 | NSW Country | 20 | South Sydney | 12 | Leichhardt Oval | Ross Gibson - NSW Country |
| 1/06/83 | Cronulla-Sutherland (Beckett 2, Gardner, Withall tries, D.Sorensen 4 goals) | 24 | St George (Rogers try, Gearin 2 goals) | 8 | Leichhardt Oval | Rowland Beckett - Cronulla-Sutherland |
| 8/06/83 | Eastern Suburbs (Michael, Grounds 2, Walford, Eden tries, Eden 4 goals) | 32 | Canberra (Wurth 2, Spears tries, Giteau 2 goals) | 16 | Leichhardt Oval | Mike Eden - Eastern Suburbs |
| 15/06/83 | Western Suburbs (Harris, Greene tries, Greene goal) | 10 | Illawarra (McKellar try) | 4 | Leichhardt Oval | David Greene - Western Suburbs |

== Quarter finals ==
| Date | Winner | Score | Loser | Score | Venue | Man of the Match |
|---|---|---|---|---|---|---|
| 22/06/83 | Eastern Suburbs (Eden 3, Walford 2 tries, Eden 5 goals) | 30 | Newtown (Speechley try, Wilson 4 goals) | 12 | Leichhardt Oval | Kevin Hastings - Eastern Suburbs |
| 29/06/83 | Cronulla-Sutherland (Nixon 2, Mullane, O'Connor, D.Sorensen, Lane tries, Hardy 5 goals) | 34 | Western Suburbs (S.Gale, T.Lamb tries, Greene 2 goals) | 12 | Leichhardt Oval | Scott Gale - Western Suburbs |
| 13/07/83 | Manly-Warringah (Sigsworth, Walker tries, Sigsworth goal) | 10 | Canterbury-Bankstown (Conlon 2 goals, C.Mortimer field goal) | 5 | Leichhardt Oval | Alan Thompson - Manly-Warringah |
| 20/07/83 | Combined Brisbane (Brennan 3, Lindenberg 2, Meninga, Paterson, Miles, Tessman tries, Meninga 6, Lewis 3 goals) | 54 | NSW Country (McCartney, Kearney tries, Elwin 3 goals) | 14 | Leichhardt Oval | Gene Miles - Combined Brisbane |

== Semi finals ==
| Date | Winner | Score | Loser | Score | Venue | Man of the Match |
|---|---|---|---|---|---|---|
| 27/07/83 | Manly-Warringah (P.Blake 2, Close, Windshuttle tries, Eadie 3 goals, P.Blake field goal) | 23 | Combined Brisbane (Brennan, Jones tries, Meninga 3 goals) | 14 | Lang Park | Graham Eadie - Manly-Warringah |
| 3/08/83 | Cronulla-Sutherland (Gardner 2, Anderson tries) | 12 | Eastern Suburbs (Neil try, Eden 3 goals) | 10 | Leichhardt Oval | Greg Nixon - Cronulla-Sutherland |

== Final ==
| Date | Winner | Score | Loser | Score | Venue | Man of the Match | Attendance |
|---|---|---|---|---|---|---|---|
| 10/8/83 | Manly-Warringah (Eadie 2, Ryan, Close, Cleal tries, Eadie 3 goals) | 26 | Cronulla-Sutherland (Ettingshausen try, Hardy goal) | 6 | Leichhardt Oval | Paul Vautin - Manly-Warringah | 15,086 |

=== Player of the Series ===
- Ian Schubert (Manly-Warringah)

=== Golden Try ===
- Royce Ayliffe (Eastern Suburbs)

== Sources ==
- https://web.archive.org/web/20070929092845/http://users.hunterlink.net.au/~maajjs/aus/nsw/sum/nsw1983.htm
