= 1981 Tooth Cup =

1981 NSWRFL Midweek Cup
NSWRFL Tooth Cup

Tournament details
- Dates: 18 March - 12 August 1981
- Teams: 16
- Venue(s): 3 (in 3 host cities)

Final positions
- Champions: South Sydney (1st title)
- Runners-up: Cronulla-Sutherland

Tournament statistics
- Matches played: 23

The 1981 Tooth Cup was the 8th edition of the NSWRFL Midweek Cup, a NSWRFL-organised national club Rugby League tournament between the leading clubs and representative teams from the NSWRFL, the BRL, the CRL, the QRL and the NZRL.

16 teams from across Australia and New Zealand played 23 matches in a round-robin format, with teams playing 2 games each. The top 8 teams advanced to a knockout stage, with the matches being held midweek during the premiership season.

== Qualified Teams ==
Team	Nickname	League	Qualification	Participation (bold indicates winners)
Canterbury-Bankstown	Bulldogs	NSWRFL	Winners of the 1980 New South Wales Rugby Football League Premiership	8th (Previous: 1974, 1975, 1976, 1977, 1978, 1979, 1980)
Eastern Suburbs	Roosters	NSWRFL	Runners-Up in the 1980 New South Wales Rugby Football League Premiership	8th (Previous: 1974, **1975**, 1976, 1977, **1978**, 1979, 1980)
Western Suburbs	Magpies	NSWRFL	Third Place in the 1980 New South Wales Rugby Football League Premiership	8th (Previous: 1974, 1975, 1976, **1977**, 1978, 1979, 1980)
St. George	Dragons	NSWRFL	Fourth Place in the 1980 New South Wales Rugby Football League Premiership	8th (Previous: 1974, 1975, 1976, 1977, 1978, 1979, 1980)
South Sydney	Rabbitohs	NSWRFL	Fifth Place in the 1980 New South Wales Rugby Football League Premiership	8th (Previous: 1974, 1975, 1976, 1977, 1978, 1979, 1980)
Parramatta	Eels	NSWRFL	Sixth Place in the 1980 New South Wales Rugby Football League Premiership	8th (Previous: 1974, 1975, 1976, 1977, 1978, 1979, **1980**)
Manly-Warringah	Sea Eagles	NSWRFL	Seventh Place in the 1980 New South Wales Rugby Football League Premiership	8th (Previous: 1974, 1975, 1976, 1977, 1978, 1979, 1980)
Newtown	Jets	NSWRFL	Eighth Place in the 1980 New South Wales Rugby Football League Premiership	8th (Previous: 1974, 1975, 1976, 1977, 1978, 1979, 1980)
Cronulla-Sutherland	Sharks	NSWRFL	Ninth Place in the 1980 New South Wales Rugby Football League Premiership	8th (Previous: 1974, 1975, 1976, 1977, 1978, **1979**, 1980)
Balmain	Tigers	NSWRFL	Tenth Place in the 1980 New South Wales Rugby Football League Premiership	8th (Previous: 1974, 1975, **1976**, 1977, 1978, 1979, 1980)
North Sydney	Bears	NSWRFL	Eleventh Place in the 1980 New South Wales Rugby Football League Premiership	8th (Previous: 1974, 1975, 1976, 1977, 1978, 1979, 1980)
Penrith	Panthers	NSWRFL	Twelfth Place in the 1980 New South Wales Rugby Football League Premiership	8th (Previous: 1974, 1975, 1976, 1977, 1978, 1979, 1980)
Brisbane	Poinsettias	BRL	League Representative Team	3rd (Previous: 1979, 1980)
NSW Country	Kangaroos	CRL	Country League Representative Team	3rd (Previous: 1979, 1980)
Queensland Country	Maroons	QRL	Country League Representative Team	3rd (Previous: 1979, 1980)
Central Districts	Falcons	NZRL	Winners of the 1980 New Zealand Rugby League Inter-District Premiership	1st

== Venues ==
Sydney	Brisbane	Lismore
Leichhardt Oval	Lang Park	Oakes Oval
Capacity: 23,000	Capacity: 45,000	Capacity: 12,000

== Round 1 ==
Date	Winner	Score	Loser	Score	Venue
18/03/81	Cronulla-Sutherland	21	North Sydney	5	Leichhardt Oval
25/03/81	South Sydney	24	Parramatta	17	Leichhardt Oval
1/04/81	Canterbury-Bankstown	20	Eastern Suburbs	14	Leichhardt Oval
8/04/81	Western Suburbs	20	Penrith	8	Leichhardt Oval
15/04/81	St George	29	Balmain	11	Oakes Oval
22/04/81	Manly-Warringah	51	Central Districts	11	Leichhardt Oval
29/04/81	Newtown	23	Combined Brisbane	19	Lang Park
20/05/81	Manly-Warringah	24	QLD Country	2	Lang Park

== Round 2 ==
Date	Winner	Score	Loser	Score	Venue
6/05/81	St George	21	South Sydney	15	Leichhardt Oval
13/05/81	Penrith	31	Central Districts	5	Leichhardt Oval
27/05/81	Western Suburbs	23	NSW Country	14	Leichhardt Oval
27/05/81	Canterbury-Bankstown	19	Parramatta	18	Leichhardt Oval
3/06/81	Balmain	21	Eastern Suburbs	5	Leichhardt Oval
10/06/81	Newtown	33	QLD Country	7	Lang Park
10/06/81	Cronulla-Sutherland	25	Combined Brisbane	5	Lang Park
17/06/81	North Sydney	13	NSW Country	9	Leichhardt Oval

Club	Played	Won	Lost	Drawn	For	Against	Diff.	Points
Manly-Warringah	2	2	0	0	75	13	62	4
Cronulla-Sutherland	2	2	0	0	46	10	36	4
Newtown	2	2	0	0	56	26	30	4
Western Suburbs	2	2	0	0	43	22	21	4
St George	2	2	0	0	50	26	24	4
Canterbury-Bankstown	2	2	0	0	39	32	7	4
Penrith	2	1	1	0	39	25	14	2
South Sydney	2	1	1	0	39	38	1	2
Balmain	2	1	1	0	32	34	-2	2
North Sydney	2	1	1	0	18	30	-12	2
Parramatta	2	0	2	0	35	43	-8	0
NSW Country	2	0	2	0	23	36	-13	0
Eastern Suburbs	2	0	2	0	19	41	-22	0
Combined Brisbane	2	0	2	0	24	48	-24	0
QLD Country	2	0	2	0	9	57	-48	0
Central Districts (NZ)	2	0	2	0	16	82	-66	0

== Quarter finals ==
Date	Winner	Score	Loser	Score	Venue
24/06/81	Newtown	22	Canterbury-Bankstown	7	Leichhardt Oval
1/07/81	Cronulla-Sutherland	23	Penrith	19	Leichhardt Oval
8/07/81	Manly-Warringah	16	Western Suburbs	13	Leichhardt Oval
15/07/81	South Sydney	23	St George	9	Leichhardt Oval

== Semi finals ==
Date	Winner	Score	Loser	Score	Venue
22/07/81	Cronulla-Sutherland	19	Newtown	2	Leichhardt Oval
5/08/81	South Sydney	24	Manly-Warringah	13	Leichhardt Oval

== Final ==
Date	Winner	Score	Loser	Score	Venue
12/08/81	South Sydney	10	Cronulla-Sutherland	2	Leichhardt Oval

The 1981 Tooth Cup Final attracted a still standing (as of 2020) Leichhardt Oval attendance record of 23,000.

=== Player of the Series ===
- Steve Rogers (Cronulla-Sutherland Sharks)

=== Golden Try ===
- Mitch Brennan (South Sydney)

== Sources ==
- http://www.rugbyleagueproject.org/
