= Newcastle rugby league team =

The Newcastle rugby league team is a representative rugby league football team made up of players selected from the Newcastle Rugby League's first grade clubs. Also called Newcastle Firsts, the team has been assembled occasionally since rugby league's first season in Australia in 1908.

== History ==
=== 1900s ===
On the Australian leg of the 1907–1908 New Zealand rugby tour of Australia and Great Britain the 'professional All Blacks' played a Newcastle side at rugby union, defeating them 53-6. They then played a "Northern Districts" selection and defeated them 37-8 in the first ever game of rugby league played in Newcastle. The visit by the New Zealanders boosted the profile of rugby league in Newcastle as the Newcastle Rebels, the only non-Sydney club in the newly-formed New South Wales Rugby Football League, were playing all their matches away in Sydney. As a result of the visit playing numbers in Newcastle surged and in 1910 the Rebels dropped out of the NSWRFL to form the Newcastle Rugby League.

=== 1910s ===
In 1910 the Newcastle Rebels dropped out of the NSWRFL to form the Newcastle Rugby League. During the 1911 New Zealand rugby league tour of Australia Newcastle played against the touring Kiwis team in a tight match almost pulling off an upset before going down 21-20. During the 1913 New Zealand rugby league tour of Australia Newcastle played a match against the Kiwis and won.

Ten of the 1914 Newcastle rugby league team went to serve in World War I, including their captain Stan Carpenter. He was joined by Horace Brown, secretary of the Newcastle and Northern District rugby leagues, within 10 days of the declaration of war. Both fought at Gallipoli, with Carpenter said to have been the first member of the Australian Imperial Force to be recommended for a Victoria Cross. He instead received a Distinguished Service Medal.

=== 1920s ===
For the 1920 Great Britain Lions tour Newcastle played two matches against the visiting team, the first on 25 August which was lost 17-10 and the 2nd on the 28th which was also lost 24-3. A touring New Zealand team defeated Newcastle 27-14 in 1921. The Newcastle Sports Ground (No1) was officially opened 16 Sept 1922 on land donated by the Australian Agricultural Company. The opening was marked by a game between Sydney's Western Suburbs club and Newcastle. Newcastle defeated the Sydney team 20 to 16. The 1924 Great Britain Lions tour saw England again defeat Newcastle 43-18 at the Newcastle Sports Ground before a crowd of 9,000. During the 1928 Great Britain Lions tour the Newcastle team lost by a score of 19-17.

=== 1930s ===
In 1932 the touring England team defeated Newcastle 22-15. However, in 1936 Newcastle defeated England 21-16. Then in 1938 New Zealand defeated Newcastle 30-19.

=== 1940s ===
On 18 June 1945 Newcastle hosted the Sydney rugby league team and defeated them 27-26. International rugby league resumed in 1946 after World War II and that year Newcastle defeated Great Britain 18-13. In 1948 New Zealand defeated Newcastle 10-9.

=== 1950s ===
In 1950 the touring Great Britain team defeated Newcastle 21-20. During the 1951 French rugby league tour of Australia and New Zealand, a Newcastle side was again formed to play against France, losing 12-8. In 1952 Newcastle defeated New Zealand 9-7. During the 1953 American All Stars tour of Australia and New Zealand Newcastle played a visiting United States national rugby league team. The Americans caused a huge upset by defeating the Newcastle side 19-10 at the Newcastle Sports Ground before a crowd of 14,160. In 1954 Newcastle, captained by Dave Parkinson, defeated Great Britain twice, 11-10 at Newcastle Sports Ground (before a crowd of 22,855) and 28-22 at Maitland. In 1955 Newcastle defeated France 17-15.

During the 1956 New Zealand rugby league tour of Australia Newcastle hosted the touring Kiwis side, defeating them 20-5 on June 4 at the Newcastle Sports Ground before a crowd of 12,500. Later that year on August 18 the 1956 New Zealand Māori rugby league tour of Australia saw the Newcastle team host the touring Māori side, defeating them 19–15 at the Newcastle Sports Ground before a crowd of 9,918.

During the 1958 Great Britain Lions tour Newcastle were defeated twice by the visiting British, 35-16 and 30-23. In 1959 New Zealand defeated Newcastle 25-6.

=== 1960s ===
In 1960 France defeated Newcastle 14-10. In 1962 Newcastle, captained by Don Schofield, played the undefeated Great Britain Lions and won 23-18. In 1963 Newcastle was beaten by New Zealand but from then until 1965 the team won 15 consecutive matches, including wins in three Country Championships and wins against South Africa 27-17, and France 16-14, as well as the victories in the State Cup. This Cup, in which Sydney teams played NSW Country Divisional teams in a knockout competition, was launched in 1964 by the NSWRL. Newcastle defeated South Sydney, North Sydney, the all-conquering St George and Parramatta to win the Cup. Newcastle won the Country Rugby League Championships five times – 1964, 1965, 1966, 1968 and 1969. In 1966 Newcastle lost to Great Britain 5-2 and in 1967 Newcastle defeated New Zealand 14-7.

=== 1970s ===
In 1970 Great Britain defeated Newcastle 49-16. Newcastle won the Country Rugby League Championship in 1973. They played against Great Britain in 1974. Newcastle reached the quarter finals of the 1975 Amco Cup. They were knocked out in the first round of the 1976 Amco Cup. In 1977 Newcastle defeated France 19-12. Newcastle failed to advance past the preliminary round of the 1977 Amco Cup. They reached the 3rd round of the 1978 Amco Cup. In 1979 Newcastle defeated New Zealand 19-12. Newcastle also won the Country Rugby League Championship in 1979.

=== 1980s ===
In 1981 Newcastle defeated France 29-0. Newcastle won the Country Rugby League Championships in 1981 and 1984. Also in 1984 Great Britain defeated Newcastle 28-18. 1986 saw Newcastle lose against New Zealand 17-22.

The Newcastle Knights were formed to enter the New South Wales Rugby League premiership in 1988, along with the Brisbane Broncos and Gold Coast-Tweed Giants.

=== Post-Newcastle Knights era ===
In 2008, the centenary year of rugby league in Australia, a Newcastle team of the code's first century was announced:

1. Clive Churchill, 2. Eddie Lumsden, 3. Ron Bailey, 4. Brian Carlson, 5. Johnny Graves, 6. Bob Banks, 7. Andrew Johns
8. Paul Harragon, 9. Allan Buman, 10. Jim Gibbs, 11. Don Schofield, 12. Herb Narvo, 13. Wally Prigg (c)
14. John Sattler, 15. Albert Paul, 16. Matthew Gidley, 17. Les Johns

== See also ==
- Brisbane rugby league team
- Sydney rugby league team
- Country New South Wales rugby league team
