= Leichhardt Oval =

Stadium in Lilyfield, New South Wales

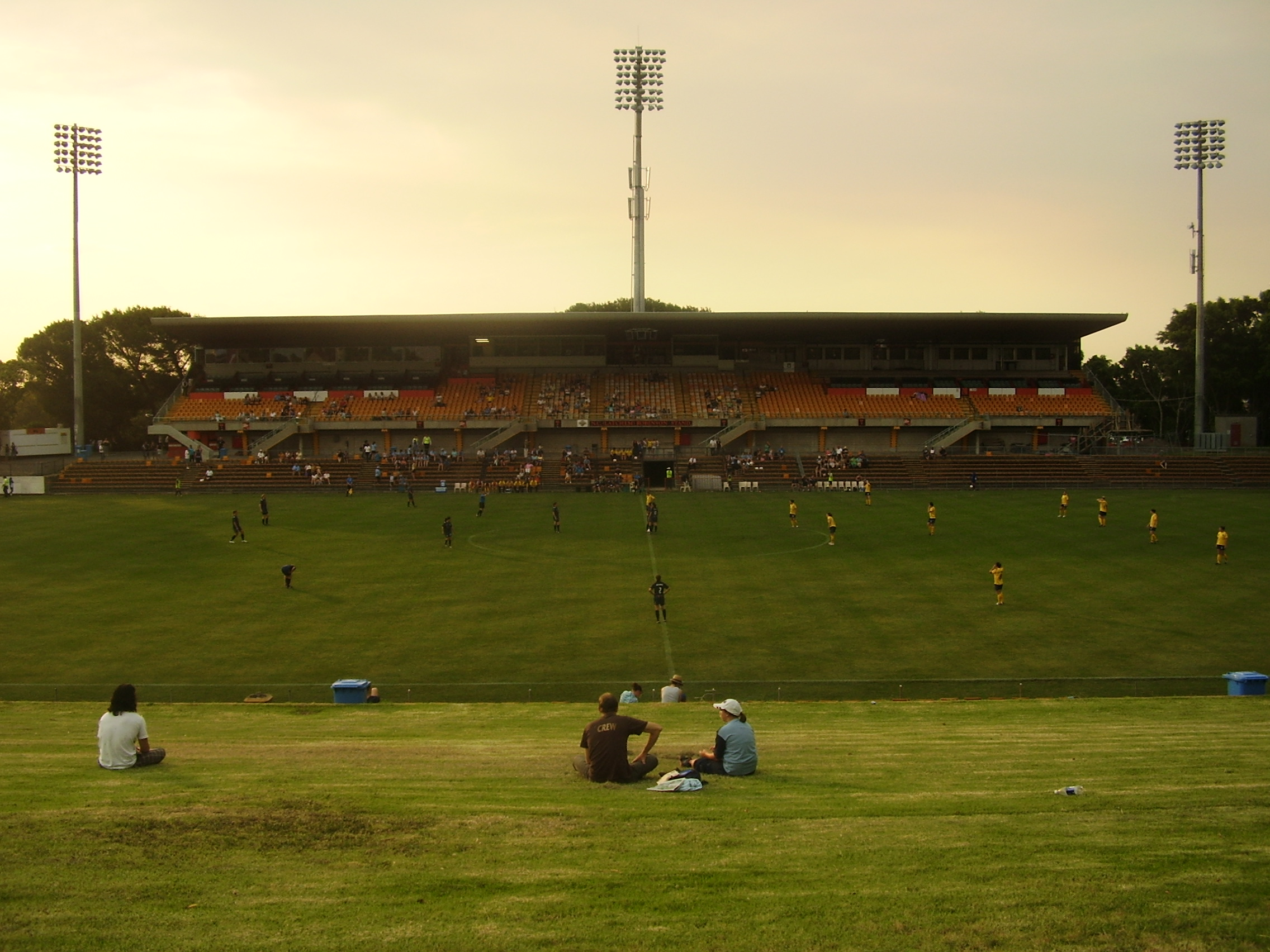
- Leichhardt Oval in November 2009
- Interactive map of Leichhardt Oval
- Location: Mary St, Leichhardt, New South Wales 2040
- Coordinates: 33°52′7″S 151°9′17″E
- Capacity: 20,000
- Surface: Grass
- Record attendance: 23,000 (South Sydney vs Cronulla-Sutherland, 12 August 1981)
- Public transit: 440, 445; Leichhardt North

Construction
- Opened: 1934

Tenants
- Balmain Tigers (NSWRL/ARL/NRL) (1934–1994, 1997–1999); Wests Tigers (NRL) (2000–present); Sydney Tigers (ARL) (1995–1996); Sydney Olympic FC (NSL) (1993–1996); A.P.I.A. Leichhardt Tigers (NSL) (1991–1992); APIA Sydney Tigers (NSWPL) (2009–2010); West APIA FC (Australian Championship) (2025–); Sydney FC (A-League) (2018–2022, 2025); Balmain-Ryde Eastwood Tigers (NSW Cup); Sydney Stars (NRC) (2014–2015); NSW Waratahs (Super Rugby) (2022)

Leichhardt Oval is a stadium located in the Sydney suburb of Lilyfield. It is primarily used for rugby league and soccer as the home ground of the Wests Tigers in the National Rugby League (NRL) and Wests APIA FC in the Australian Championship.

The stadium is currently undergoing a $40 million redevelopment set to be completed 2028. The redevelopment includes an overhaul of the western grandstand, new female friendly change rooms, and upgraded corporate and media facilities. During the construction period the stadium is not hosting any games, with its two major tenants using other grounds.

The ground opened in 1934 as the home ground of the Balmain Tigers. It has since hosted a number of sports other than rugby league including major interstate cricket matches from 1978 to 1981. Despite the grounds antiquated facilities, match attendances still frequently hit capacity, with the ground being beloved for its “old-school” atmosphere.

== History ==
Leichhardt Oval was first used as a rugby league football ground in 1934 and became the home ground of the Balmain Tigers. The ground underwent a major overhaul during the 1970s when the configuration of the ground was changed (from east-west to north-south) and lighting installed. As it was one of the few rugby league grounds with lighting and was located close to the city, Leichhardt Oval began to be used for non-Balmain games such as the pre-origin interstate games between NSW and Queensland (Leichhardt was originally preferred to the Sydney Cricket Ground for interstate games from 1978 due to dwindling crowds in an era when NSW dominated the contests. Also, unlike the SCG at the time, Leichhardt had lights allowing for night games).

On 16 June 1981, Leichhardt Oval hosted the last interstate game between New South Wales and Queensland played under the old "State of Residence" rules, prior to the permanent move to the State of Origin series. The match, which attracted 6,268 spectators, saw New South Wales, captained by Steve Rogers, defeat Queensland 22–9. Players included Chris Anderson, Noel Cleal, Steve Mortimer, Ray Price, and Les Boyd for New South Wales, coached by Ted Glossop, and Mal Meninga, Gene Miles, Chris Close, and Wally Lewis for Queensland, who were captain-coached by Arthur Beetson.

From 1974, with the ground having lights for night football, Leichhardt was also used as the base of the NSWRL's annual mid-week competition, hosting most of the games and all Finals from 1974 until 1986 before the Final was moved to the new Parramatta Stadium in 1987. The last Mid-week Final held at Leichhardt was the 1986 National Panasonic Cup Final, with the Parramatta Eels defeating Balmain 32–16.

On 4 August 1985, a crowd of 21,707 set a then Balmain Tigers ground attendance record for a Round 22 clash in the 1985 Winfield Cup against the St. George Dragons, won 17–15 by St. George. This remained the Tigers attendance record for only four years until beaten by the 22,750 who attended the Round 22 match against Penrith in 1989.

Balmain left the ground after the 1994 NSWRL season when they moved to Parramatta Stadium as part of an identity change to the Sydney Tigers. The move was not popular with supporters however and the club returned to Leichhardt for the 1997 season, with the Balmain name returning. Balmain played their final game as a stand-alone team in 1999 when they defeated Parramatta 20–10 in appalling conditions. The ground then became one of the home grounds of the new Wests Tigers team.

== Leichhardt Oval today (2000–present) ==
The ground remains a venue for high level rugby league in Australia although it currently holds only five NRL games a year. This decision to reduce the number of games is mainly financial and related to issues such as ground capacity, corporate facilities, and financial incentives to play games at Bankwest Stadium and ANZ Stadium. Ironically for a ground once prized for its lighting, the cost of playing night games is another factor as the current lighting is not considered acceptable.

In spite (or perhaps because) of its antiquated facilities, Leichhardt Oval is beloved by Tigers fans especially those who formerly supported Balmain. Match attendances are usually close to or at capacity. Attempts to improve facilities are underway with the goal to return Leichhardt to its place as a top level rugby league venue.

In 2007, the New South Wales Government announced it would provide finance to help in the redevelopment of the ground. Previously it had provided a loan to match grants made from Leichhardt Council and the Balmain Football Club. A group known as Stop the Rot aims to revamp the ground into a first class sporting venue. A.P.I.A. Leichhardt Tigers were renamed Sydney Tigers before the start of the 2009 New South Wales Premier League, and moved their home ground from Lambert Park back to Leichhardt Oval, for the first time in over a decade. A-League club Sydney FC also played a pre-season friendly against rivals Central Coast Mariners on 6 June 2009. The stadium continues to host pre-season games for Sydney teams, friendly games for Australian national youth teams and FFA Cup games. In 2011 Lambert Park received a major upgrade that installed a synthetic pitch, which has seen higher profile matches moved to the Oval as professional teams prefer not to risk injury on a non-natural surface.

On 21 November 2009, Leichhardt Oval hosted 2 matches in a double-header of the W-League. Sydney FC took on Perth Glory while after that Melbourne Victory played the Central Coast Mariners. During 2009, the thirty-year lease of Leichhardt Oval by the Wests Tigers Franchise, came to an end.

In 2009, the Keith Barnes Stand and Norm Robinson Stand were named in honour of Balmain Tigers greats, Keith Barnes and Norm Robinson.

From 2005 until 2012, it was home of the Balmain-Ryde Eastwood Tigers (an amalgamation between Balmain and the old Sydney Metropolitan League side Ryde Eastwood), who played in the New South Wales Cup competition. From 2013 until 2017, the club joined forces with the Western Suburbs Magpies, and formed the Wests Tigers (just like the first grade competition). From 2018 onwards, Wests Tigers changed their reserves team to the Western Suburbs Magpies. This NSW Cup club now shares its home games between Leichhardt Oval and Campbelltown Stadium.

The Australian rugby union football team Sydney Stars, a joint venture between the Sydney University and Balmain rugby clubs, announced Leichhardt Oval as its home ground in the National Rugby Championship (NRC).

On 28 June 2015, the laneway at Leichhardt Oval was named "Laurie's Lane" in honour of former long-time Balmain Tigers fan Laurie Nichols.

On 22 June 2019, two Rugby League Test matches were played at Leichhardt Oval, with Fiji playing Lebanon in game one, with Papua New Guinea and Samoa playing in the second game.

On 29 September 2019, the St. George Illawarra Dragons played the Sydney Roosters in the first standalone NRL Women's Premiership match to be played in Australia.

On 6 August 2022, Leichhardt Oval hosted St Ignatius College Riverview v St Joseph's College Hunters Hill for the GPS rugby union competition. The game was to be played at Riverview, however, it was relocated to Leichhardt Oval due to the expected crowd of 15,000. Near the end of the match the railing of a small grandstand collapsed and several spectators were injured.

== Attendance record ==
The stadium has a nominal capacity of 20,000. However, its recorded highest crowd figure is 23,000, which occurred for the 1981 Tooth Cup Final between South Sydney and Cronulla. The Wests Tigers' highest attendance at the venue is 22,877, which was set on 24 July 2005 as the Tigers defeated South Sydney 42–20. The highest recorded crowd for a Balmain Tigers game is 22,750. This record was set on 27 August 1989, for a Round 22 NSWRL game against the Penrith Panthers, won 33–6 by the Grand Final bound Tigers.

== Proposed upgrades ==
In June 2024, a AU$40 million upgrade of Leichhardt Oval was announced by the Federal and New South Wales Governments as well as the Inner West Council. Seating capacity is to be increased via a new grandstand at the northern end as well as refurbishments undertaken on the existing spectator facilities and upgrades to the players changerooms.

The funding was helped by fan campaigns such as "Save Leichhardt Oval".

== Interstate matches ==
List of interstate matches played between New South Wales and Queensland at Leichhardt Oval.

Game#	Date	Result	Attendance	Notes
1	13 June 1978	NSW def. Qld 28–12	14,278	First interstate game in Sydney ever played at a suburban ground
2	5 June 1979	NSW def. Qld 35–20	4,502	1979 Interstate series
3	27 May 1980	NSW def. Qld 17–7	1,368	1980 Interstate series
4	16 June 1981	NSW def. Qld 22–9	6,268	1981 Interstate series. Last interstate game played under the State of Residence rules until 1994.

== Midweek Cup Finals ==
Leichhardt Oval played host to 13 Amco Cup / Tooth Cup / KB Cup / Panasonic Cup Finals between 1974 and 1986.

Game#	Date	Result	Attendance
1	21 August 1974	Western Division def. Penrith 6–2	
2	20 August 1975	Eastern Suburbs def. Parramatta 17–7	
3	18 August 1976	Balmain def. North Sydney 21–7	
4	17 August 1977	Western Suburbs def. Eastern Suburbs 6–5	
5	16 August 1978	Eastern Suburbs def. St George 16–4	21,000
6	15 August 1979	Cronulla-Sutherland def. Combined Brisbane 22–5	
7	20 August 1980	Parramatta def. Balmain 8–5	
8	12 August 1981	South Sydney def. Cronulla-Sutherland 10–2	23,000
9	11 August 1982	Manly-Warringah def. Newtown 23–8	
10	10 August 1983	Manly-Warringah def. Cronulla-Sutherland 26–6	
11	15 August 1984	Combined Brisbane def. Eastern Suburbs 12–11	
12	5 June 1985	Balmain def. Cronulla-Sutherland 14–12	15,000
13	4 June 1986	Parramatta def. Balmain 32–16	
