= 1980 Tooth Cup =

1980 NSWRFL Midweek Cup
NSWRFL Tooth Cup

Tournament details
- Dates: 2 April - 20 August 1980
- Teams: 16
- Venue(s): 3 (in 3 host cities)

Final positions
- Champions: Parramatta (1st title)
- Runners-up: Balmain

Tournament statistics
- Matches played: 23

The 1980 Tooth Cup was the 7th edition of the NSWRFL Midweek Cup, a NSWRFL-organised national club Rugby League tournament between the leading clubs and representative teams from the NSWRFL, the BRL, the CRL, the QRL and the NZRL.

A total of 16 teams from across Australia and New Zealand played 23 matches in a round-robin format with teams playing 2 games each with the top 8 teams advanced to a knockout stage, with the matches being held midweek during the premiership season.

== Qualified Teams ==
Team	Nickname	League	Qualification	Participation (bold indicates winners)
St. George	Dragons	NSWRFL	Winners of the 1979 New South Wales Rugby Football League Premiership	7th (Previous: 1974, 1975, 1976, 1977, 1978, 1979)
Canterbury-Bankstown	Bulldogs	NSWRFL	Runners-Up in the 1979 New South Wales Rugby Football League Premiership	7th (Previous: 1974, 1975, 1976, 1977, 1978, 1979)
Parramatta	Eels	NSWRFL	Third Place in the 1979 New South Wales Rugby Football League Premiership	7th (Previous: 1974, 1975, 1976, 1977, 1978, 1979)
Cronulla-Sutherland	Sharks	NSWRFL	Fourth Place in the 1979 New South Wales Rugby Football League Premiership	7th (Previous: 1974, 1975, 1976, 1977, 1978, **1979**)
Western Suburbs	Magpies	NSWRFL	Fifth Place in the 1979 New South Wales Rugby Football League Premiership	7th (Previous: 1974, 1975, 1976, **1977**, 1978, 1979)
Balmain	Tigers	NSWRFL	Sixth Place in the 1979 New South Wales Rugby Football League Premiership	7th (Previous: 1974, 1975, **1976**, 1977, 1978, 1979)
Manly-Warringah	Sea Eagles	NSWRFL	Seventh Place in the 1979 New South Wales Rugby Football League Premiership	7th (Previous: 1974, 1975, 1976, 1977, 1978, 1979)
Eastern Suburbs	Roosters	NSWRFL	Eighth Place in the 1979 New South Wales Rugby Football League Premiership	7th (Previous: 1974, **1975**, 1976, 1977, **1978**, 1979)
South Sydney	Rabbitohs	NSWRFL	Ninth Place in the 1979 New South Wales Rugby Football League Premiership	7th (Previous: 1974, 1975, 1976, 1977, 1978, 1979)
Penrith	Panthers	NSWRFL	Tenth Place in the 1979 New South Wales Rugby Football League Premiership	7th (Previous: 1974, 1975, 1976, 1977, 1978, 1979)
Newtown	Jets	NSWRFL	Eleventh Place in the 1979 New South Wales Rugby Football League Premiership	7th (Previous: 1974, 1975, 1976, 1977, 1978, 1979)
North Sydney	Bears	NSWRFL	Twelfth Place in the 1979 New South Wales Rugby Football League Premiership	7th (Previous: 1974, 1975, 1976, 1977, 1978, 1979)
Brisbane	Poinsettias	BRL	League Representative Team	2nd (Previous: 1979)
NSW Country	Kangaroos	CRL	Country League Representative Team	2nd (Previous: 1979)
Queensland Country	Maroons	QRL	Country League Representative Team	2nd (Previous: 1979)
Auckland	Falcons	NZRL	Winners of the 1979 New Zealand Rugby League Inter-District Premiership	7th (Previous: 1974, 1975, 1976, 1977, 1978, 1979)

== Venues ==
Sydney	Brisbane	Queanbeyan
Leichhardt Oval	Lang Park	Seiffert Oval
Capacity: 23,000	Capacity: 45,000	Capacity: 20,000

== Round 1 ==
Date	Winner	Score	Loser	Score	Venue
2/04/80	Eastern Suburbs	14	Combined Brisbane	4	Lang Park
9/04/80	St George	16	Balmain	5	Leichhardt Oval
16/04/80	Newtown	22	Manly-Warringah	7	Leichhardt Oval
23/04/80	Penrith	26	Cronulla-Sutherland	14	Leichhardt Oval
30/04/80	Parramatta	20	South Sydney	7	Leichhardt Oval
7/05/80	Western Suburbs	40	Auckland	14	Leichhardt Oval
21/05/80	Canterbury-Bankstown	35	NSW Country	3	Leichhardt Oval
28/05/80	North Sydney	40	QLD Country	5	Leichhardt Oval

== Round 2 ==
Date	Winner	Score	Loser	Score	Venue
14/05/80	Eastern Suburbs	11	Newtown	10	Leichhardt Oval
4/06/80	Parramatta	18	Western Suburbs	11	Leichhardt Oval
11/06/80	Cronulla-Sutherland	19	Canterbury-Bankstown	18	Leichhardt Oval
18/06/80	Combined Brisbane	27	Manly-Warringah	20	Lang Park
25/06/80	South Sydney	47	Auckland	5	Leichhardt Oval
25/06/80	St George	40	North Sydney	9	Leichhardt Oval
2/07/80	Penrith	18	NSW Country	9	Seiffert Oval
2/07/80	Balmain	45	QLD Country	5	Lang Park

Club	Played	Won	Lost	Drawn	For	Against	Diff.	Points
St George	2	2	0	0	56	14	42	4
Penrith	2	2	0	0	44	23	21	4
Parramatta	2	2	0	0	38	18	20	4
Eastern Suburbs	2	2	0	0	25	14	11	4
Canterbury-Bankstown	2	1	1	0	53	22	31	2
South Sydney	2	1	1	0	54	25	29	2
Balmain	2	1	1	0	50	21	29	2
Western Suburbs	2	1	1	0	51	32	19	2
Newtown	2	1	1	0	32	18	14	2
North Sydney	2	1	1	0	49	45	4	2
Combined Brisbane	2	1	1	0	34	34	-3	2
Cronulla-Sutherland	2	1	1	0	33	44	-11	2
Manly-Warringah	2	0	2	0	27	49	-22	0
NSW Country	2	0	2	0	12	53	-41	0
Auckland	2	0	2	0	19	87	-68	0
QLD Country	2	0	2	0	10	85	-75	0

== Quarter finals ==
Date	Winner	Score	Loser	Score	Venue
9/07/80	Eastern Suburbs	20	Penrith	9	Leichhardt Oval
16/07/80	Western Suburbs	10	St George	4	Leichhardt Oval
23/07/80	Parramatta	16	Canterbury-Bankstown	7	Leichhardt Oval
30/07/80	Balmain	22	South Sydney	14	Leichhardt Oval

== Semi finals ==
Date	Winner	Score	Loser	Score	Venue
6/08/80	Parramatta	9	Western Suburbs	6	Leichhardt Oval
13/08/80	Balmain	18	Eastern Suburbs	8	Leichhardt Oval

== Final ==
Date	Winner	Score	Loser	Score	Venue
20/08/80	Parramatta	8	Balmain	5	Leichhardt Oval

=== Player of the Series ===
- Peter Sterling (Parramatta)

=== Golden Try ===
- John Dorahy (Manly-Warringah)

== Sources ==
- https://web.archive.org/web/20070927025237/http://users.hunterlink.net.au/~maajjs/aus/nsw/sum/nsw1980.htm
