= 1979 Amco Cup =

1979 NSWRFL Midweek Cup
NSWRFL Amco Cup

Tournament details
- Dates: 28 March - 15 August 1979
- Teams: 16
- Venue(s): 5 (in 4 host cities)

Final positions
- Champions: Cronulla-Sutherland (1st title)
- Runners-up: Brisbane

Tournament statistics
- Matches played: 27

The 1979 Amco Cup was the 6th edition of the NSWRFL Midweek Cup, a NSWRFL-organised national club Rugby League tournament between the leading clubs and representative teams from the NSWRFL, the BRL, the CRL, the QRL and the NZRL.

A total of 16 teams from across Australia and New Zealand played 27 matches in a round-robin group format with the winners of each group advancing to a knockout stage, with the matches being held midweek during the premiership season.

== Qualified Teams ==
Team	Nickname	League	Qualification	Participation (bold indicates winners)
Manly-Warringah	Sea Eagles	NSWRFL	Winners of the 1978 New South Wales Rugby Football League Premiership	6th (Previous: 1974, 1975, 1976, 1977, 1978)
Cronulla-Sutherland	Sharks	NSWRFL	Runners-Up in the 1978 New South Wales Rugby Football League Premiership	6th (Previous: 1974, 1975, 1976, 1977, 1978)
Western Suburbs	Magpies	NSWRFL	Third Place in the 1978 New South Wales Rugby Football League Premiership	6th (Previous: 1974, 1975, 1976, **1977**, 1978)
Parramatta	Eels	NSWRFL	Fourth Place in the 1978 New South Wales Rugby Football League Premiership	6th (Previous: 1974, 1975, 1976, 1977, 1978)
Canterbury-Bankstown	Bulldogs	NSWRFL	Fifth Place in the 1978 New South Wales Rugby Football League Premiership	6th (Previous: 1974, 1975, 1976, 1977, 1978)
Eastern Suburbs	Roosters	NSWRFL	Sixth Place in the 1978 New South Wales Rugby Football League Premiership	6th (Previous: 1974, **1975**, 1976, 1977, **1978**)
South Sydney	Rabbitohs	NSWRFL	Seventh Place in the 1978 New South Wales Rugby Football League Premiership	6th (Previous: 1974, 1975, 1976, 1977, 1978)
St. George	Dragons	NSWRFL	Eighth Place in the 1978 New South Wales Rugby Football League Premiership	6th (Previous: 1974, 1975, 1976, 1977, 1978)
Balmain	Tigers	NSWRFL	Ninth Place in the 1978 New South Wales Rugby Football League Premiership	6th (Previous: 1974, 1975, **1976**, 1977, 1978)
Penrith	Panthers	NSWRFL	Tenth Place in the 1978 New South Wales Rugby Football League Premiership	6th (Previous: 1974, 1975, 1976, 1977, 1978)
North Sydney	Bears	NSWRFL	Eleventh Place in the 1978 New South Wales Rugby Football League Premiership	6th (Previous: 1974, 1975, 1976, 1977, 1978)
Newtown	Jets	NSWRFL	Twelfth Place in the 1978 New South Wales Rugby Football League Premiership	6th (Previous: 1974, 1975, 1976, 1977, 1978)
Brisbane	Poinsettias	BRL	League Representative Team	1st
NSW Country	Kangaroos	CRL	Country Representative Team	1st
Queensland Country	Maroons	QRL	Country Representative Team	1st
Auckland	Falcons	NZRL	Winners of the 1978 New Zealand Rugby League Inter-District Premiership	6th (Previous: 1974, 1975, 1976, 1977, 1978)

== Venues ==
Sydney		Brisbane	Lismore	Griffith
Leichhardt Oval	Penrith Park	Lang Park	Oakes Oval	West End Stadium
Capacity: 23,000	Capacity: 22,500	Capacity: 45,000	Capacity: 12,000	Capacity: 10,000

== Group A ==
Date	Winner	Score	Loser	Score	Venue
28/03/79	Eastern Suburbs	19	Manly-Warringah	7	Leichhardt Oval
2/05/79	Combined Brisbane	13	St George	10	Lang Park
30/05/79	Eastern Suburbs	12	St George	6	Leichhardt Oval
27/06/79	Combined Brisbane	13	Manly-Warringah	10	Leichhardt Oval
18/07/79	St George	7	Manly-Warringah	4	Griffith
25/07/79	Combined Brisbane	17	Eastern Suburbs	8	Lang Park

Club	Played	Won	Lost	Drawn	For	Against	Diff.	Points
Combined Brisbane	3	3	0	0	43	28	15	6
Eastern Suburbs	3	2	0	1	39	30	9	4
St George	3	1	0	2	23	29	-6	2
Manly-Warringah	3	0	0	3	21	39	-18	0

== Group B ==
Date	Winner	Score	Loser	Score	Venue
4/04/79	Cronulla-Sutherland	22	Canterbury-Bankstown	8	Leichhardt Oval
11/04/79	Penrith	12	Auckland	5	Leichhardt Oval
9/05/79	Penrith	18	Cronulla-Sutherland	10	Penrith Park
30/05/79	Canterbury-Bankstown	12	Auckland	3	Leichhardt Oval
4/07/79	Canterbury-Bankstown	18	Penrith	10	Leichhardt Oval
11/07/79	Cronulla-Sutherland	30	Auckland	10	Leichhardt Oval

Club	Played	Won	Lost	Drawn	For	Against	Diff.	Points
Cronulla-Sutherland	3	2	0	1	62	36	26	4
Penrith	3	2	0	1	40	33	7	4
Canterbury-Bankstown	3	2	0	1	38	35	3	4
Auckland	3	0	0	3	18	54	-36	0

== Group C ==
Date	Winner	Score	Loser	Score	Venue
19/04/79	Parramatta	44	North Sydney	10	Leichhardt Oval
15/05/79	QLD Country	16	Newtown	14	Lang Park
13/06/79	Newtown	15	Parramatta	13	Leichhardt Oval
21/06/79	QLD Country	12	North Sydney	5	Lang Park
4/07/79	QLD Country	18	Parramatta	9	Lang Park
12/07/79	North Sydney	35	Newtown	13	Leichhardt Oval

Club	Played	Won	Lost	Drawn	For	Against	Diff.	Points
QLD Country	3	3	0	0	46	28	18	6
Parramatta	3	1	0	2	66	43	23	2
North Sydney	3	1	0	2	50	69	-19	2
Newtown	3	1	0	2	42	64	-22	2

== Group D ==
Date	Winner	Score	Loser	Score	Venue
25/04/79	Western Suburbs	22	Balmain	11	Leichhardt Oval
23/05/79	South Sydney	25	NSW Country	10	Leichhardt Oval
6/06/79	NSW Country	14	Western Suburbs	11	Leichhardt Oval
20/06/79	Balmain	5	South Sydney	3	Leichhardt Oval
11/07/79	Balmain	25	NSW Country	11	Leichhardt Oval
18/07/79	South Sydney	9	Western Suburbs	7	Leichhardt Oval

Club	Played	Won	Lost	Drawn	For	Against	Diff.	Points
South Sydney	3	2	0	1	37	22	15	4
Balmain	3	2	0	1	41	36	5	4
Western Suburbs	3	1	0	2	40	34	6	2
NSW Country	3	1	0	2	35	61	-26	2

== Semi finals ==
Date	Winner	Score	Loser	Score	Venue
1/08/79	Cronulla-Sutherland	13	South Sydney	9	Leichhardt Oval
8/08/79	Combined Brisbane	8	QLD Country	5	Lang Park

== Final ==
15 August 1979

Cronulla-Sutherland	22–5	Combined Brisbane
Tries: Gary Cameron (3), Rick Bourke; Goals: Steve Rogers (5)		Try: Norm Carr; Goal: Mal Meninga

Leichhardt Oval
Attendance: 15,800
Referee: Greg Hartley
Player of the Match: Gary Cameron

=== Player of the Series ===
- Kurt Sorensen (Cronulla-Sutherland)

=== Golden Try ===
- Robert Laurie (South Sydney)
