= 1978 Amco Cup =

1978 NSWRFL Midweek Cup
NSWRFL Amco Cup

Tournament details
- Dates: 15 March - 16 August 1978
- Teams: 38
- Venue(s): 16 (in 15 host cities)

Final positions
- Champions: Eastern Suburbs (2nd title)
- Runners-up: St. George

Tournament statistics
- Matches played: 37

The 1978 Amco Cup was the 5th edition of the NSWRFL Midweek Knockout Cup, a NSWRFL-organised national club Rugby League tournament between the leading clubs and representative teams from the NSWRFL, the BRL, the CRL, the QRL, the NZRL, Western Australia and the Northern Territory.

A total of 38 teams from across Australia and New Zealand played 37 matches in a straight knock-out format, with the matches being held midweek during the premiership season.

== Qualified Teams ==
Team	Nickname	League	Qualification	Participation (bold indicates winners)
St. George	Dragons	NSWRFL	Winners of the 1977 New South Wales Rugby Football League Premiership	5th (Previous: 1974, 1975, 1976, 1977)
Parramatta	Eels	NSWRFL	Runners-Up in the 1977 New South Wales Rugby Football League Premiership	5th (Previous: 1974, 1975, 1976, 1977)
Eastern Suburbs	Roosters	NSWRFL	Third Place in the 1977 New South Wales Rugby Football League Premiership	5th (Previous: 1974, **1975**, 1976, 1977)
Balmain	Tigers	NSWRFL	Fourth Place in the 1977 New South Wales Rugby Football League Premiership	5th (Previous: 1974, 1975, **1976**, 1977)
Manly-Warringah	Sea Eagles	NSWRFL	Fifth Place in the 1977 New South Wales Rugby Football League Premiership	5th (Previous: 1974, 1975, 1976, 1977)
Cronulla-Sutherland	Sharks	NSWRFL	Sixth Place in the 1977 New South Wales Rugby Football League Premiership	5th (Previous: 1974, 1975, 1976, 1977)
Canterbury-Bankstown	Berries	NSWRFL	Seventh Place in the 1977 New South Wales Rugby Football League Premiership	5th (Previous: 1974, 1975, 1976, 1977)
North Sydney	Bears	NSWRFL	Eighth Place in the 1977 New South Wales Rugby Football League Premiership	5th (Previous: 1974, 1975, 1976, 1977)
Western Suburbs	Magpies	NSWRFL	Ninth Place in the 1977 New South Wales Rugby Football League Premiership	5th (Previous: 1974, 1975, 1976, **1977**)
Penrith	Panthers	NSWRFL	Tenth Place in the 1977 New South Wales Rugby Football League Premiership	5th (Previous: 1974, 1975, 1976, 1977)
South Sydney	Rabbitohs	NSWRFL	Eleventh Place in the 1977 New South Wales Rugby Football League Premiership	5th (Previous: 1974, 1975, 1976, 1977)
Newtown	Jets	NSWRFL	Twelfth Place in the 1977 New South Wales Rugby Football League Premiership	5th (Previous: 1974, 1975, 1976, 1977)
Eastern Suburbs	Tigers	BRL	Winners of the 1977 Brisbane Rugby League Premiership	3rd (Previous: 1976, 1977)
Redcliffe	Dolphins	BRL	Runners-Up in the 1977 Brisbane Rugby League Premiership	3rd (Previous: 1976, 1977)
Western Suburbs	Panthers	BRL	Third Place in the 1977 Brisbane Rugby League Premiership	3rd (Previous: 1976, 1977)
Northern Suburbs	Devils	BRL	Fourth Place in the 1977 Brisbane Rugby League Premiership	4th (Previous: 1975, 1976, 1977)
Past Brothers	Leprechauns	BRL	Fifth Place in the 1977 Brisbane Rugby League Premiership	4th (Previous: 1975, 1976, 1977)
Fortitude Valley	Diehards	BRL	Sixth Place in the 1977 Brisbane Rugby League Premiership	4th (Previous: 1975, 1976, 1977)
Wynnum-Manly	Seagulls	BRL	Seventh Place in the 1977 Brisbane Rugby League Premiership	2nd (Previous: 1977)
Southern Suburbs	Magpies	BRL	Eighth Place in the 1977 Brisbane Rugby League Premiership	4th (Previous: 1975, 1976, 1977)
Monaro	Colts	CRL	Winners of the 1977 Country Rugby League Championship	5th (Previous: 1974, 1975, 1976, 1977)
Newcastle	Rebels	CRL	Runners-Up in the 1977 Country Rugby League Championship	4th (Previous: 1975, 1976, 1977)
Southern Division	Bulls	CRL	Third Place in the 1977 Country Rugby League Championship	5th (Previous: 1974, 1975, 1976, 1977)
Riverina	Bulls	CRL	Fourth Place in the 1977 Country Rugby League Championship	5th (Previous: 1974, 1975, 1976, 1977)
Northern Division	Tigers	CRL	Fifth Place in the 1977 Country Rugby League Championship	5th (Previous: 1974, 1975, 1976, 1977)
Western Division	Rams	CRL	Sixth Place in the 1977 Country Rugby League Championship	5th (Previous: **1974**, 1975, 1976, 1977)
North Coast	Dolphins	CRL	Seventh Place in the 1977 Country Rugby League Championship	5th (Previous: 1974, 1975, 1976, 1977)
Illawarra	Flametrees	CRL	Eighth Place in the 1977 Country Rugby League Championship	5th (Previous: 1974, 1975, 1976, 1977)
Central Queensland	Capras	QRL	Queensland Country Regional Team	2nd (Previous: 1977)
Gold Coast	Vikings	QRL	Queensland Country Regional Team	1st
Ipswich	Diggers	QRL	Queensland Country Regional Team	4th (Previous: 1975, 1976, 1977)
North Queensland	Marlins	QRL	Queensland Country Regional Team	3rd (Previous: 1976, 1977)
Toowoomba	Clydesdales	QRL	Queensland Country Regional Team	4th (Previous: 1975, 1976, 1977)
Wide Bay	Bulls	QRL	Queensland Country Regional Team	3rd (Previous: 1976, 1977)
Auckland	Falcons	NZRL	Winners of the 1977 New Zealand Rugby League Inter-District Premiership	5th (Previous: 1974, 1975, 1976, 1977)
Wellington	Black & Yellow Capitals	NZRL	Runners-Up in the 1977 New Zealand Rugby League Inter-District Premiership	1st
Northern Territory	Bulls	NTRL	State Representative Team	3rd (Previous: 1976, 1977)
Western Australia	Black Swans	WARL	State Representative Team	2nd (Previous: 1977)

== Venues ==
Sydney		Brisbane	Newcastle	Queanbeyan	Wollongong	Wagga Wagga	Tamworth	Coffs Harbour	Lismore	Griffith	Ipswich	Southport	Surfers Paradise	Maryborough	Darwin
Leichhardt Oval	Orana Park	Lang Park	Newcastle International Sports Centre	Seiffert Oval	Wollongong Showground	Eric Weissel Oval	Scully Park	Coffs Harbour Showground	Oakes Oval	West End Stadium	North Ipswich Reserve	Wally Fankhauser Sports Park	Lex Bell Oval	Eskdale Park	Richardson Park
Capacity: 23,000	Capacity: 20,000	Capacity: 45,000	Capacity: 33,000	Capacity: 20,000	Capacity: 23,000	Capacity: 10,000	Capacity: 13,000	Capacity: 10,000	Capacity: 12,000	Capacity: 10,000	Capacity: 10,000	Capacity: 7,000	Capacity: 8,000	Capacity: 10,000	Capacity: 10,000

== Round 1 ==
Date	Winner	Score	Loser	Score	Venue
15/03/78	Illawarra	63	Wellington NZ	5	Wollongong Showground
26/03/78	Toowoomba	22	Ipswich	12	North Ipswich Reserve
30/03/78	Gold Coast	18	North Queensland	16	Chris Cunningham Field
2/04/78	Western Australia	21	Northern Territory	18	Richardson Park
5/04/78	Wide Bay	12	Central Queensland	3	Eskdale Park
8/04/78	Western Division	12	Southern Division	4	Orana Park

== Round 2 ==
Date	Winner	Score	Loser	Score	Venue
30/03/78	Wests BRL*	8	Wynnum-Manly	8	Lang Park
30/03/78	Newtown	49	Brothers	0	Leichhardt Oval
5/04/78	Souths BRL	10	Gold Coast	4	Chris Cunningham Field
5/04/78	Illawarra	35	Fortitude Valley	7	Lang Park
12/04/78	Riverina	43	Wide Bay	4	Griffith
12/04/78	Newcastle	51	Western Australia	5	Newcastle ISC
17/05/78	South Sydney	22	Western Division	9	Leichhardt Oval
24/05/78	North Coast	22	Toowoomba	13	Oakes Oval

== Round 3 ==
Date	Winner	Score	Loser	Score	Venue
12/04/78	Newtown	13	Canterbury-Bankstown	4	Leichhardt Oval
19/04/78	Western Suburbs	25	Souths BRL	5	Leichhardt Oval
26/04/78	Wests BRL	4	Redcliffe	3	Lang Park
3/05/78	Riverina	36	Penrith	2	Eric Weissel Oval
10/05/78	Cronulla-Sutherland	57	Newcastle	5	Leichhardt Oval
24/05/78	Illawarra	44	Norths BRL	5	Wollongong Showground
31/05/78	South Sydney	9	Northern Division	5	Scully Park
14/06/78	North Sydney	46	North Coast	3	Coffs Harbour

== Round 4 ==
Date	Winner	Score	Loser	Score	Venue
3/05/78	Eastern Suburbs	16	Western Suburbs	10	Leichhardt Oval
24/05/78	Auckland	39	Riverina	3	Leichhardt Oval
7/06/78	Parramatta	28	Wests BRL	0	Leichhardt Oval
14/06/78	Cronulla-Sutherland	15	Monaro	8	Seiffert Oval
14/06/78	Illawarra	19	Balmain	10	Leichhardt Oval
27/06/78	St George	35	Newtown	11	Leichhardt Oval
4/07/78	Manly-Warringah	11	South Sydney	9	Lang Park
5/07/78	Easts BRL	27	North Sydney	6	Lang Park

== Quarter finals ==
Date	Winner	Score	Loser	Score	Venue
5/07/78	Eastern Suburbs	12	Illawarra	2	Leichhardt Oval
12/07/78	St George	27	Parramatta	2	Leichhardt Oval
19/07/78	Manly-Warringah	27	Easts BRL	10	Lang Park
26/07/78	Cronulla-Sutherland	22	Auckland	6	Leichhardt Oval

== Semi finals ==
Date	Winner	Score	Loser	Score	Venue
2/08/78	Eastern Suburbs	14	Manly-Warringah	2	Leichhardt Oval
9/08/78	St George	21	Cronulla-Sutherland	7	Leichhardt Oval

== Final ==
Date	Winner	Score	Loser	Score	Venue
16/08/78	Eastern Suburbs	16	St George	4	Leichhardt Oval

As with all mid-season Cup games, the Final of the 1978 Amco Cup was broadcast into NSW by 0–10 with commentary from Ray Warren, Keith Barnes and in his first ever co-commentating role on television, legendary rugby league broadcaster Frank Hyde.

=== Player of the Series ===
Kevin Hastings (Eastern Suburbs)

=== Golden Try ===
- Mitch Brennan (St George)

== Notes ==
- *- Advanced on penalty count-back
