= Oakes Oval =

Cricket pitch in Lismore

Coordinates: 28°48′38.28″S 153°16′52.88″E

- OCG
- Interactive map of Oakes Oval
- Full name: Oakes Oval
- Location: Lismore, New South Wales
- Capacity: 10,000–12,000
- Type: Sports venue
- Surface: grass
- Record attendance: 8,612 24/02/07: NRL Pre-Season: Parramatta Eels v Gold Coast Titans
- Field shape: Oval

Construction
- Opened: 1934 (first recorded match)

Tenants
- New South Wales cricket team (Sheffield Shield) (1979–2006); New South Wales Country Eagles (NRC) (2014–present)

Ground information
- Website: Ground profile

International information
- Only women's ODI: 13 January 1993: Australia v New Zealand
- As of 1 September 2020; Source: CricketArchive

Oakes Oval (known prior to 1957 as the Recreation Ground) is a cricket ground in Lismore, New South Wales, Australia. The first recorded match on the ground came in 1934 when the Richmond River Colts played the New South Wales Colts. The ground held matches in the 1978 and 1979 World Series Cricket. It held its first first-class match in 1979 when New South Wales played Queensland in the Sheffield Shield. The next first-class match to be staged there came in 1991 when New South Wales played the touring Indians. A further first-class match was held there in the 2006 Pura Cup between New South Wales and Victoria. A single List A match was played there in 1992 when New South Wales played the touring West Indians.

A single Women's One Day International was played there in 1993 when the Australia Women's Cricket Team played the New Zealand Women's Cricket Team in a day/night match.

Other sports to be played at the ground include both rugby union and rugby league, as well as soccer. Oakes Oval is also one of the home grounds for the NSW Country Eagles team that plays in the National Rugby Championship.
