= Scully Park =

Rugby league stadium in New South Wales, Australia

- Interactive map of Scully Park
- Full name: Scully Park Regional Sporting Precinct
- Location: West Tamworth, New South Wales, Australia
- Coordinates: 31.102401°S 150.91832°E
- Owner: Tamworth Regional Council
- Capacity: 11,000
- Surface: Grass

Tenants
- Tamworth Lions, Tamworth Pirates Rugby Club, Wests Tigers (NRL)

Scully Park is a rugby league stadium in West Tamworth, New South Wales, Australia.
