= 1976 Amco Cup =

1976 NSWRFL Midweek Cup
NSWRFL Amco Cup

Tournament details
- Dates: 31 March - 18 August 1976
- Teams: 35
- Venue(s): 9 (in 8 host cities)

Final positions
- Champions: Balmain (1st title)
- Runners-up: North Sydney

Tournament statistics
- Matches played: 34

The 1976 Amco Cup was the 3rd edition of the NSWRFL Midweek Cup, a NSWRFL-organised national Rugby League tournament between the leading clubs and representative teams from the NSWRFL, the BRL, the CRL, the QRL, the NZRL and the Northern Territory.

A total of 35 teams from across Australia and New Zealand played 34 matches in a straight knock-out format, with the matches being held midweek during the premiership season.

== Qualified Teams ==
Team	Nickname	League	Qualification	Participation (bold indicates winners)
Enter in Round 2
Eastern Suburbs	Roosters	NSWRFL	Winners of the 1975 New South Wales Rugby Football League Premiership	3rd (Previous: 1974, **1975**)
St. George	Dragons	NSWRFL	Runners-Up in the 1975 New South Wales Rugby Football League Premiership	3rd (Previous: 1974, 1975)
Manly-Warringah	Sea Eagles	NSWRFL	Third Place in the 1975 New South Wales Rugby Football League Premiership	3rd (Previous: 1974, 1975)
Parramatta	Eels	NSWRFL	Fourth Place in the 1975 New South Wales Rugby Football League Premiership	3rd (Previous: 1974, 1975)
Canterbury-Bankstown	Berries	NSWRFL	Fifth Place in the 1975 New South Wales Rugby Football League Premiership	3rd (Previous: 1974, 1975)
Western Suburbs	Magpies	NSWRFL	Sixth Place in the 1975 New South Wales Rugby Football League Premiership	3rd (Previous: 1974, 1975)
Balmain	Tigers	NSWRFL	Seventh Place in the 1975 New South Wales Rugby Football League Premiership	3rd (Previous: 1974, 1975)
Cronulla-Sutherland	Sharks	NSWRFL	Eighth Place in the 1975 New South Wales Rugby Football League Premiership	3rd (Previous: 1974, 1975)
North Sydney	Bears	NSWRFL	Ninth Place in the 1975 New South Wales Rugby Football League Premiership	3rd (Previous: 1974, 1975)
Newtown	Jets	NSWRFL	Tenth Place in the 1975 New South Wales Rugby Football League Premiership	3rd (Previous: 1974, 1975)
Penrith	Panthers	NSWRFL	Eleventh Place in the 1975 New South Wales Rugby Football League Premiership	3rd (Previous: 1974, 1975)
South Sydney	Rabbitohs	NSWRFL	Twelfth Place in the 1975 New South Wales Rugby Football League Premiership	3rd (Previous: 1974, 1975)
Western Suburbs	Panthers	BRL	Winners of the 1975 Brisbane Rugby League Premiership	1st
Redcliffe	Dolphins	BRL	Runners-Up in the 1975 Brisbane Rugby League Premiership	1st
Northern Suburbs	Devils	BRL	Third Place in the 1975 Brisbane Rugby League Premiership	2nd (Previous: 1975)
Eastern Suburbs	Tigers	BRL	Fifth Place in the 1975 Brisbane Rugby League Premiership	1st
Past Brothers	Leprechauns	BRL	Sixth Place in the 1975 Brisbane Rugby League Premiership	2nd (Previous: 1975)
Southern Suburbs	Magpies	BRL	Seventh Place in the 1975 Brisbane Rugby League Premiership	2nd (Previous: 1975)
Fortitude Valley	Diehards	BRL	Eighth Place in the 1975 Brisbane Rugby League Premiership	2nd (Previous: 1975)
Riverina	Bulls	CRL	Winners of the 1975 Country Rugby League Championship	3rd (Previous: 1974, 1975)
Illawarra	Flametrees	CRL	Runners-Up in the 1975 Country Rugby League Championship	3rd (Previous: 1974, 1975)
North Coast	Dolphins	CRL	Third Place in the 1975 Country Rugby League Championship	3rd (Previous: 1974, 1975)
Southern Division	Bulls	CRL	Fourth Place in the 1975 Country Rugby League Championship	3rd (Previous: 1974, 1975)
Monaro	Colts	CRL	Fifth Place in the 1975 Country Rugby League Championship	3rd (Previous: 1974, 1975)
Western Division	Rams	CRL	Sixth Place in the 1975 Country Rugby League Championship	3rd (Previous: **1974**, 1975)
Northern Division	Tigers	CRL	Seventh Place in the 1975 Country Rugby League Championship	3rd (Previous: 1974, 1975)
Newcastle	Rebels	CRL	Eighth Place in the 1975 Country Rugby League Championship	2nd (Previous: 1975)
Canterbury	Reds	NZRL	Winners of the 1975 New Zealand Rugby League Inter-District Premiership	1st
Auckland	Falcons	NZRL	Runners-Up in the 1975 New Zealand Rugby League Inter-District Premiership	3rd (Previous: 1974, 1975)
Enter in Round 1
Ryde-Eastwood	Hawks	NSWRFL	Winners of the 1975 NSWRFL Metropolitan League	3rd (Previous: 1974, 1975)
Ipswich	Diggers	QRL	Queensland Country Regional Team	2nd (Previous: 1975)
North Queensland	Marlins	QRL	Queensland Country Regional Team	1st
Toowoomba	Clydesdales	QRL	Queensland Country Regional Team	2nd (Previous: 1975)
Wide Bay	Bulls	QRL	Queensland Country Regional Team	1st
Northern Territory	Bulls	NTRL	State Representative Team	1st

== Venues ==
Sydney		Brisbane	Newcastle	Queanbeyan	Tamworth	Lismore	Rockhampton	Toowoomba
Leichhardt Oval	Penrith Park	Lang Park	Newcastle International Sports Centre	Seiffert Oval	Scully Park	Oakes Oval	Browne Park	Athletic Oval
Capacity: 23,000	Capacity: 22,500	Capacity: 45,000	Capacity: 33,000	Capacity: 20,000	Capacity: 13,000	Capacity: 12,000	Capacity: 10,000	Capacity: 10,000

== Round 1 ==
Date	Winner	Score	Loser	Score	Venue
31/03/76	Toowoomba	39	Northern Territory	7	Athletic Oval
31/03/76	Ryde-Eastwood	29	Ipswich	13	Athletic Oval
31/03/76	North Queensland	21	Wide Bay	11	Browne Park

== Round 2 ==
Date	Winner	Score	Loser	Score	Venue
31/03/76	Manly-Warringah	35	Newcastle	17	Newcastle International Sports Centre
31/03/76	South Sydney	17	Souths BRL	8	Lang Park
7/04/76	North Sydney	5	Eastern Suburbs	4	Leichhardt Oval
7/04/76	Brothers	19	Penrith	8	Lang Park
7/04/76	Canterbury-Bankstown	40	North Queensland	0	Lang Park
14/04/76	Auckland	30	Redcliffe	5	Lang Park
14/04/76	Cronulla-Sutherland	28	Toowoomba	5	Lang Park
21/04/76	Western Suburbs	21	Monaro	9	Seiffert Oval
21/04/76	Easts BRL	38	Canterbury NZ	7	Lang Park
21/04/76	Newtown	32	Ryde-Eastwood	6	Leichhardt Oval
21/04/76	Parramatta	20	North Coast	4	Oakes Oval
28/04/76	Riverina	36	Fortitude Valley	2	Lang Park
28/04/76	Balmain	26	Southern Division	9	Leichhardt Oval
5/05/76	St George	34	Western Division	16	Leichhardt Oval
5/05/76	Northern Division	16	Illawarra	9	Scully Park
5/05/76	Wests BRL	17	Norths BRL	2	Lang Park

== Round 3 ==
Date	Winner	Score	Loser	Score	Venue
12/05/76	North Sydney	19	Newtown	7	Leichhardt Oval
19/05/76	Brothers	12	Northern Division	6	Leichhardt Oval
26/05/76	Riverina	16	South Sydney	11	Leichhardt Oval
2/06/76	St George	17	Cronulla-Sutherland	12	Leichhardt Oval
9/06/76	Manly-Warringah	24	Wests BRL	8	Lang Park
16/06/76	Balmain	28	Auckland	8	Leichhardt Oval
23/06/76	Parramatta	22	Western Suburbs	2	Penrith Park
30/06/76	Canterbury-Bankstown	13	Easts BRL	7	Leichhardt Oval

== Quarter finals ==
Date	Winner	Score	Loser	Score	Venue
7/07/76	North Sydney	44	Riverina	15	Leichhardt Oval
14/07/76	Balmain	19	Brothers	3	Leichhardt Oval
21/07/76	Canterbury-Bankstown	8	Manly-Warringah	7	Leichhardt Oval
28/07/76	Parramatta	22	St George	20	Leichhardt Oval

== Semi finals ==
Date	Winner	Score	Loser	Score	Venue
4/08/76	Balmain	11	Canterbury-Bankstown	10	Lang Park
11/08/76	North Sydney	10	Parramatta	9	Leichhardt Oval

== Final ==
Date	Winner	Score	Loser	Score	Venue
18 August	Balmain	21	North Sydney	7	Leichhardt Oval

The final attracted a ground record of 21,670 to Leichhardt Oval. Balmain's second-rower Dennis Tutty was named man-of-the-match.

== Program ==
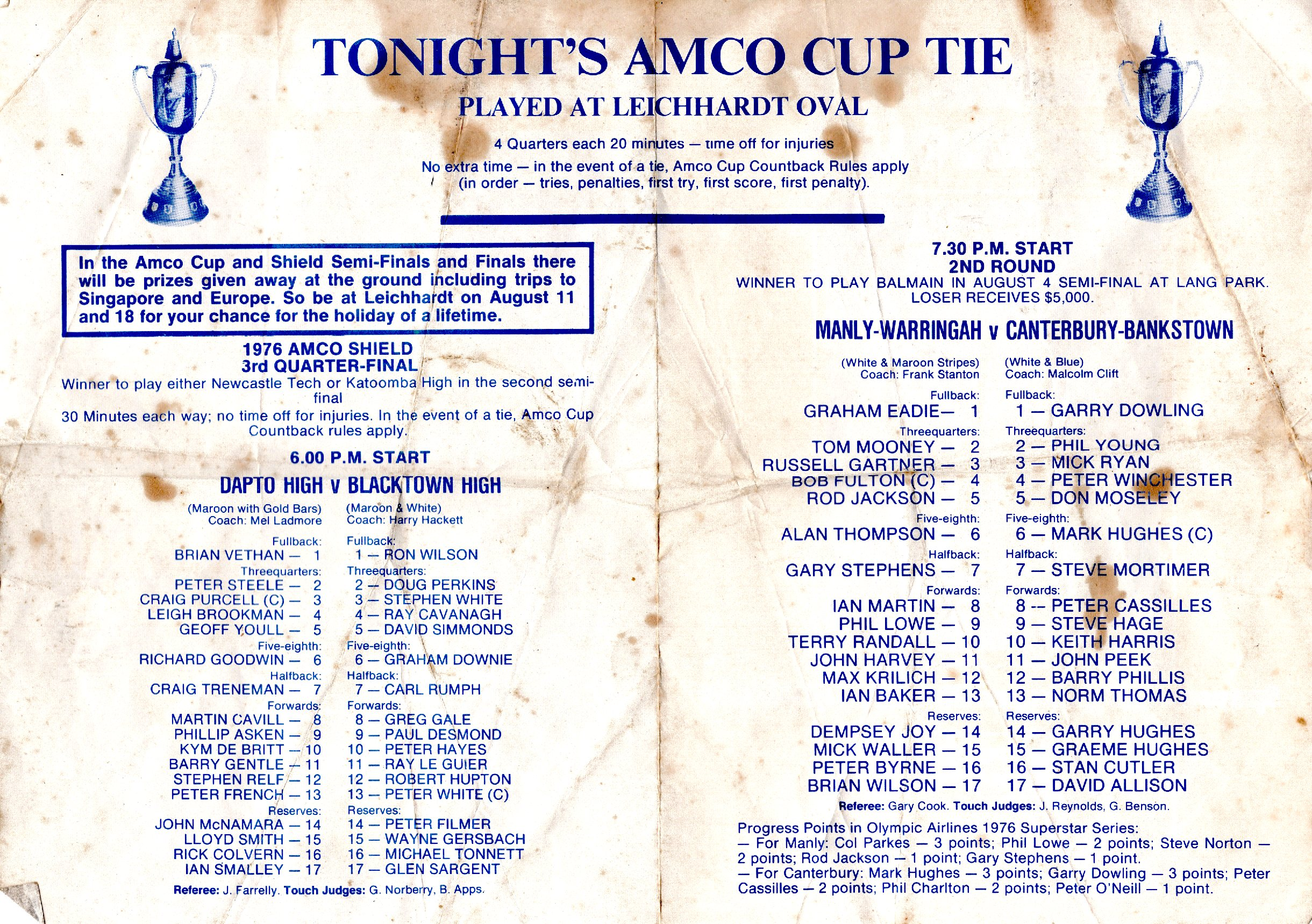

== Awards ==
=== Player of the Series ===
- John Gray (North Sydney)

=== Golden Try ===
- Paul Hayward (Newtown)

== Sources ==
- http://users.hunterlink.net.au/~maajjs/aus/nsw/sum/nsw1976.htm
