= 1977 Amco Cup =

1977 NSWRFL Midweek Cup
NSWRFL Amco Cup

Tournament details
- Dates: 27 March - 17 August 1977
- Teams: 37
- Venue(s): 9 (in 8 host cities)

Final positions
- Champions: Western Suburbs (1st title)
- Runners-up: Eastern Suburbs

Tournament statistics
- Matches played: 36

The 1977 Amco Cup was the 4th edition of the NSWRFL Midweek Cup, a NSWRFL-organised national club Rugby League tournament between the leading clubs and representative teams from the NSWRFL, the BRL, the CRL, the QRL, the NZRL, Western Australia and the Northern Territory.

A total of 37 teams from across Australia and New Zealand played 36 matches in a straight knock-out format, with the matches being held midweek during the premiership season.

== Qualified teams ==
Team	Nickname	League	Qualification	Participation (bold indicates winners)
Enter in Round 2
Manly-Warringah	Sea Eagles	NSWRFL	Winners of the 1976 New South Wales Rugby Football League Premiership	4th (Previous: 1974, 1975, 1976)
Parramatta	Eels	NSWRFL	Runners-Up in the 1976 New South Wales Rugby Football League Premiership	4th (Previous: 1974, 1975, 1976)
Canterbury-Bankstown	Berries	NSWRFL	Third Place in the 1976 New South Wales Rugby Football League Premiership	4th (Previous: 1974, 1975, 1976)
St. George	Dragons	NSWRFL	Fourth Place in the 1976 New South Wales Rugby Football League Premiership	4th (Previous: 1974, 1975, 1976)
Eastern Suburbs	Roosters	NSWRFL	Fifth Place in the 1976 New South Wales Rugby Football League Premiership	4th (Previous: 1974, **1975**, 1976)
Balmain	Tigers	NSWRFL	Sixth Place in the 1976 New South Wales Rugby Football League Premiership	4th (Previous: 1974, 1975, **1976**)
Western Suburbs	Magpies	NSWRFL	Seventh Place in the 1976 New South Wales Rugby Football League Premiership	4th (Previous: 1974, 1975, 1976)
Cronulla-Sutherland	Sharks	NSWRFL	Eighth Place in the 1976 New South Wales Rugby Football League Premiership	4th (Previous: 1974, 1975, 1976)
Penrith	Panthers	NSWRFL	Ninth Place in the 1976 New South Wales Rugby Football League Premiership	4th (Previous: 1974, 1975, 1976)
South Sydney	Rabbitohs	NSWRFL	Tenth Place in the 1976 New South Wales Rugby Football League Premiership	4th (Previous: 1974, 1975, 1976)
North Sydney	Bears	NSWRFL	Eleventh Place in the 1976 New South Wales Rugby Football League Premiership	4th (Previous: 1974, 1975, 1976)
Newtown	Jets	NSWRFL	Twelfth Place in the 1976 New South Wales Rugby Football League Premiership	4th (Previous: 1974, 1975, 1976)
Western Suburbs	Panthers	BRL	Winners of the 1976 Brisbane Rugby League Premiership	2nd (Previous: 1976)
Eastern Suburbs	Tigers	BRL	Runners-Up in the 1976 Brisbane Rugby League Premiership	2nd (Previous: 1976)
Past Brothers	Leprechauns	BRL	Third Place in the 1976 Brisbane Rugby League Premiership	3rd (Previous: 1975, 1976)
Southern Suburbs	Magpies	BRL	Fourth Place in the 1976 Brisbane Rugby League Premiership	3rd (Previous: 1975, 1976)
Redcliffe	Dolphins	BRL	Fifth Place in the 1976 Brisbane Rugby League Premiership	2nd (Previous: 1976)
Wynnum-Manly	Seagulls	BRL	Sixth Place in the 1976 Brisbane Rugby League Premiership	1st
Fortitude Valley	Diehards	BRL	Seventh Place in the 1976 Brisbane Rugby League Premiership	3rd (Previous: 1975, 1976)
Northern Suburbs	Devils	BRL	Eighth Place in the 1976 Brisbane Rugby League Premiership	3rd (Previous: 1975, 1976)
Illawarra	Flametrees	CRL	Winners of the 1976 Country Rugby League Championship	4th (Previous: 1974, 1975, 1976)
Western Division	Rams	CRL	Runners-Up in the 1976 Country Rugby League Championship	4th (Previous: **1974**, 1975, 1976)
Riverina	Bulls	CRL	Third Place in the 1976 Country Rugby League Championship	4th (Previous: 1974, 1975, 1976)
North Queensland	Marlins	QRL	Queensland Country Regional Team	2nd (Previous: 1976)
Toowoomba	Clydesdales	QRL	Queensland Country Regional Team	3rd (Previous: 1975, 1976)
Auckland	Falcons	NZRL	Winners of the 1976 New Zealand Rugby League Inter-District Premiership	4th (Previous: 1974, 1975, 1976)
Canterbury	Reds	NZRL	Runners-Up in the 1976 New Zealand Rugby League Inter-District Premiership	2nd (Previous: 1976)
Enter in Round 1
Northern Division	Tigers	CRL	Fourth Place in the 1976 Country Rugby League Championship	4th (Previous: 1974, 1975, 1976)
Monaro	Colts	CRL	Fifth Place in the 1976 Country Rugby League Championship	4th (Previous: 1974, 1975, 1976)
Southern Division	Bulls	CRL	Sixth Place in the 1976 Country Rugby League Championship	4th (Previous: 1974, 1975, 1976)
Newcastle	Rebels	CRL	Seventh Place in the 1976 Country Rugby League Championship	3rd (Previous: 1975, 1976)
North Coast	Dolphins	CRL	Eighth Place in the 1976 Country Rugby League Championship	4th (Previous: 1974, 1975, 1976)
Central Queensland	Capras	QRL	Queensland Country Regional Team	1st
Ipswich	Diggers	QRL	Queensland Country Regional Team	3rd (Previous: 1975, 1976)
Wide Bay	Bulls	QRL	Queensland Country Regional Team	2nd (Previous: 1976)
Northern Territory	Bulls	NTRL	State Representative Team	2nd (Previous: 1976)
Western Australia	Black Swans	WARL	State Representative Team	1st

== Venues ==
Sydney		Brisbane	Newcastle	Queanbeyan	Rockhampton	Toowoomba	Ipswich	Perth
Leichhardt Oval	Redfern Oval	Lang Park	Newcastle International Sports Centre	Seiffert Oval	Browne Park	Athletic Oval	North Ipswich Reserve	Lathlain Park
Capacity: 23,000	Capacity: 20,000	Capacity: 45,000	Capacity: 33,000	Capacity: 20,000	Capacity: 10,000	Capacity: 10,000	Capacity: 10,000	Capacity: 20,000

== Round 1 ==
Date	Winner	Score	Loser	Score	Venue	Canberra Times
27/03/77	Western Australia	23	Northern Territory	18	Perth	
30/03/77	Central Queensland*	7	Wide Bay	7	Browne Park	Result
27/04/77	Northern Division	26	Newcastle	17	Newcastle ISC	Result
4/05/77	North Coast	40	Ipswich	22	North Ipswich Reserve	
11/5/77	Monaro	18	Southern Division	15	Seiffert Oval	Report

== Round 2 ==
Date	Winner	Score	Loser	Score	Venue	Canberra Times
30/03/77	Brothers	16	Wynnum-Manly	15	Lang Park	
30/03/77	St George	22	Balmain	12	Leichhardt Oval	Results
30/03/77	Toowoomba	31	North Queensland	13	Athletic Oval	Results
6/04/77	Cronulla-Sutherland	75	Central Queensland	3	Leichhardt Oval	Short Report
6/04/77	Redcliffe	19	Wests BRL	10	Lang Park	
13/04/77	Western Suburbs	60	Norths BRL	0	Lang Park	
20/04/77	Parramatta	21	North Sydney	7	Leichhardt Oval	Result
27/04/77	Penrith	36	Western Division	5	Leichhardt Oval	Short Report
4/05/77	Fortitude Valley	19	Illawarra	10	Lang Park	Results
4/05/77	Eastern Suburbs	16	Manly-Warringah	8	Leichhardt Oval	Results
11/05/77	South Sydney	39	Western Australia	10	Leichhardt Oval	Result
18/05/77	Canterbury-Bankstown	20	North Coast	7	Leichhardt Oval	Result
25/05/77	Monaro	21	Easts BRL	18	Lang Park	Preview Report
25/05/77	Newtown	32	Riverina	3	Leichhardt Oval	Result
25/05/77	Northern Division	23	Auckland	2	Leichhardt Oval	
4/05/77	Souths BRL	20	Canterbury NZ	12	Lang Park	

== Round 3 ==
Date	Winner	Score	Loser	Score	Venue	Canberra Times
1/06/77	St George	18	Cronulla-Sutherland	17	Leichhardt Oval	Results
1/06/77	Fortitude Valley	13	Brothers	9	Lang Park	Results
8/06/77	Canterbury-Bankstown	25	Toowoomba	15	Athletic Oval	Results
8/06/77	Western Suburbs	20	Redcliffe	2	Leichhardt Oval	Results
15/06/77	Monaro	12	South Sydney	3	Leichhardt Oval	Preview Reports
22/06/77	Penrith	18	Newtown	16	Leichhardt Oval	
29/06/77	Northern Division	34	Souths BRL	20	Lang Park	Report
29/06/77	Eastern Suburbs	19	Parramatta	2	Leichhardt Oval	Report

== Quarter finals ==
Date	Winner	Score	Loser	Score	Venue	Canberra Times
6/07/77	Western Suburbs	27	St George	7	Leichhardt Oval	Report
13/07/77	Penrith	17	Northern Division	10	Leichhardt Oval	Report
20/07/77	Eastern Suburbs	35	Fortitude Valley	2	Lang Park	Result
27/07/77	Canterbury-Bankstown	33	Monaro	10	Leichhardt Oval	Preview Report

== Semi finals ==
Date	Winner	Score	Loser	Score	Venue	Canberra Times
3/08/77	Eastern Suburbs	18	Penrith	7	Leichhardt Oval	Preview Report
10/08/77	Western Suburbs	8	Canterbury-Bankstown	7	Leichhardt Oval	Preview Report

== Final ==
Date	Winner	Score	Loser	Score	Venue	Canberra Times
17/08/77	Western Suburbs	6	Eastern Suburbs	5	Leichhardt Oval	Preview Report

- *- Advanced on penalty count-back

== Awards ==
=== Player of the Series ===
- Graeme O'Grady (Western Suburbs)

=== Golden Try ===
- Steve Rogers (Cronulla-Sutherland)
