= Brisbane rugby league team =

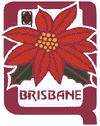
Combined Brisbane Poinsettia Badge

The Brisbane Rugby League team, also called Brisbane Capitals, was an Australian representative rugby league football side made up of players from the Brisbane Rugby League's first-grade premiership clubs. The team was assembled occasionally from 1907, the year rugby league football was first played in Australia, until 1988, the year the Brisbane Broncos began competing in Sydney's Winfield Cup premiership.

== History ==
In 1907 a team made up of Brisbane rugby players was formed to play a game for the 1907–1908 New Zealand rugby tour of Australia and Great Britain, which the visiting 'All Blacks' won 43–10. The Bulimba Cup was a competition contested by the Brisbane, Ipswich and Toowoomba representative rugby league sides which started in 1925.

During the 1932 Great Britain Lions tour a Brisbane rugby league team was assembled to play against the tourists, at the Brisbane Cricket Ground, handing them their first loss of the tour 15–18 before a crowd of 4,843.

During the 1951 French rugby league tour of Australia and New Zealand, a Brisbane side was again formed to play against France, losing to the visitors in the last two minutes by a single point.

During the 1958 Great Britain Lions tour the Brisbane rugby league team hosted the touring British at the Brisbane Exhibition Ground and were defeated 29–34.

During the 1966 Great Britain Lions tour Brisbane hosted a match against the touring side, winning 19 – 17.

The Bulimba Cup competition last took place in 1972. Brisbane had won it more than any other team.

A Combined Brisbane side reached the final of the 1979 AMCO Cup but lost 22–5 to the Cronulla-Sutherland Sharks. Brisbane's side for the 1984 National Panasonic Cup, captained by Wally Lewis, defeated the Eastern Suburbs Roosters 12–11 in the final at the Leichhardt Oval in Sydney.

When the Brisbane Broncos assembled the team to play their first ever game in 1988, most of the inaugural 17 players (including Lewis, Scott, Miles, Kilroy, and Dowling) that defeated the defending 1987 Sydney Rugby League premiers Manly-Warringah Sea-Eagles 44–10 at Lang Park, had previously played in the Brisbane Rugby League's team. Later that year a combined Brisbane team played against the touring Great Britain Lions. Since 1988 a Queensland Residents side has occasionally been selected and drew heavily on the Brisbane Rugby League premiership until that competition ended in 1997.

== See also ==
- Sydney rugby league team
- Newcastle rugby league team
- Country New South Wales rugby league team
