= 1975 Amco Cup =

1975 NSWRFL Midweek Cup
NSWRFL Amco Cup

Tournament details
- Dates: 2 April - 20 August 1975
- Teams: 28
- Venue(s): 7 (in 5 host cities)

Final positions
- Champions: Eastern Suburbs (1st title)
- Runners-up: Parramatta

Tournament statistics
- Matches played: 27

The 1975 Amco Cup was the 2nd edition of the NSWRFL Midweek Cup, a NSWRFL-organised national Rugby League tournament between the leading clubs and representative teams from the NSWRFL, the BRL, the CRL, the QRL and the NZRL.

A total of 28 teams from across Australia and New Zealand played 27 matches in a straight knock-out format, with the matches being held midweek during the premiership season.

== Qualified Teams ==
Team	Nickname	League	Qualification	Participation (bold indicates winners)
Enter in Round 2
Western Division	Rams	CRL	Winners of the 1974 Amco Cup	2nd (Previous: **1974**)
Eastern Suburbs	Roosters	NSWRFL	Winners of the 1974 New South Wales Rugby Football League Premiership	2nd (Previous: 1974)
Fortitude Valley	Diehards	BRL	Winners of the 1974 Brisbane Rugby League Premiership	1st
Auckland	Falcons	NZRL	Winners of the 1974 New Zealand Rugby League Inter-District Premiership	2nd (Previous: 1974)
Enter in Round 1
Canterbury-Bankstown	Berries	NSWRFL	Runners-Up in the 1974 New South Wales Rugby Football League Premiership	2nd (Previous: 1974)
Western Suburbs	Magpies	NSWRFL	Third Place in the 1974 New South Wales Rugby Football League Premiership	2nd (Previous: 1974)
Manly-Warringah	Sea Eagles	NSWRFL	Fourth Place in the 1974 New South Wales Rugby Football League Premiership	2nd (Previous: 1974)
South Sydney	Rabbitohs	NSWRFL	Fifth Place in the 1974 New South Wales Rugby Football League Premiership	2nd (Previous: 1974)
North Sydney	Bears	NSWRFL	Sixth Place in the 1974 New South Wales Rugby Football League Premiership	2nd (Previous: 1974)
Newtown	Jets	NSWRFL	Seventh Place in the 1974 New South Wales Rugby Football League Premiership	2nd (Previous: 1974)
St. George	Dragons	NSWRFL	Eighth Place in the 1974 New South Wales Rugby Football League Premiership	2nd (Previous: 1974)
Penrith	Panthers	NSWRFL	Ninth Place in the 1974 New South Wales Rugby Football League Premiership	2nd (Previous: 1974)
Cronulla-Sutherland	Sharks	NSWRFL	Tenth Place in the 1974 New South Wales Rugby Football League Premiership	2nd (Previous: 1974)
Parramatta	Eels	NSWRFL	Eleventh Place in the 1974 New South Wales Rugby Football League Premiership	2nd (Previous: 1974)
Balmain	Tigers	NSWRFL	Twelfth Place in the 1974 New South Wales Rugby Football League Premiership	2nd (Previous: 1974)
Ryde-Eastwood	Hawks	NSWRFL	Winners of the 1974 NSWRFL Metropolitan League	2nd (Previous: 1974)
Past Brothers	Leprechauns	BRL	Runners-Up in the 1974 Brisbane Rugby League Premiership	1st
Northern Suburbs	Devils	BRL	Third Place in the 1974 Brisbane Rugby League Premiership	1st
Southern Suburbs	Magpies	BRL	Fourth Place in the 1974 Brisbane Rugby League Premiership	1st
Illawarra	Flametrees	CRL	Winners of the 1974 Country Rugby League Championship	2nd (Previous: 1974)
Northern Division	Tigers	CRL	Runners-Up in the 1974 Country Rugby League Championship	2nd (Previous: 1974)
Southern Division	Bulls	CRL	Third Place in the 1974 Country Rugby League Championship	2nd (Previous: 1974)
Monaro	Colts	CRL	Fourth Place in the 1974 Country Rugby League Championship	2nd (Previous: 1974)
Newcastle	Rebels	CRL	Fifth Place in the 1974 Country Rugby League Championship	1st
North Coast	Dolphins	CRL	Sixth Place in the 1974 Country Rugby League Championship	2nd (Previous: 1974)
Riverina	Bulls	CRL	Eighth Place in the 1974 Country Rugby League Championship	2nd (Previous: 1974)
Ipswich	Diggers	QRL	Queensland Country Regional Team	1st
Toowoomba	Clydesdales	QRL	Queensland Country Regional Team	1st

== Venues ==
Sydney			Brisbane	Newcastle	Wagga Wagga	Tamworth
Leichhardt Oval	Redfern Oval	Penrith Park	Lang Park	Newcastle International Sports Centre	Eric Weissel Oval	Scully Park
Capacity: 23,000	Capacity: 20,000	Capacity: 22,500	Capacity: 45,000	Capacity: 33,000	Capacity: 10,000	Capacity: 13,000

== Round 1 ==
Date	Winner	Score	Loser	Score	Venue	Canberra Times
2/04/75	South Sydney	37	Ipswich	6	Redfern Oval	
2/04/75	Newtown*	11	Western Suburbs	11	Redfern Oval	Report
9/04/75	Ryde-Eastwood	17	Southern Division	16	Newcastle International Sports Centre	Result
9/04/75	Newcastle	27	Cronulla-Sutherland	8	Newcastle International Sports Centre	
16/04/75	Balmain	24	Brothers	16	Lang Park	
16/04/75	Manly-Warringah	44	North Coast	2	Lang Park	Report
23/04/75	Parramatta	27	Monaro	19	Eric Weissel Oval	Report
23/04/75	Canterbury-Bankstown	21	Riverina	16	Eric Weissel Oval	Report
30/04/75	Toowoomba	22	North Sydney	13	Leichhardt Oval	Result
30/04/75	Illawarra	26	Northern Division	9	Leichhardt Oval	
7/05/75	St George	35	Norths BRL	16	Leichhardt Oval	Report
7/05/75	Penrith	37	Souths BRL	9	Leichhardt Oval	

== Round 2 ==
Date	Winner	Score	Loser	Score	Venue	Canberra Times
14/05/75	South Sydney	13	Newtown	10	Leichhardt Oval	Result
21/05/75	Eastern Suburbs	34	Ryde-Eastwood	0	Leichhardt Oval	
28/05/75	Newcastle	20	Balmain	7	Leichhardt Oval	
4/06/75	Auckland*	14	Manly-Warringah	14	Leichhardt Oval	Result
11/06/75	Parramatta	24	Canterbury-Bankstown	12	Leichhardt Oval	Result
18/06/75	Fortitude Valley	15	Toowoomba	6	Lang Park	Result
25/06/75	Penrith	20	Illawarra	10	Penrith Park	
2/07/75	St George	18	Western Division	3	Leichhardt Oval	Result

== Quarter finals ==
Date	Winner	Score	Loser	Score	Venue	Canberra Times
9/07/75	Eastern Suburbs	13	South Sydney	8	Scully Park	Report
16/07/75	Auckland	26	Newcastle	16	Leichhardt Oval	Result
23/07/75	Parramatta	33	Fortitude Valley	10	Leichhardt Oval	
30/07/75	St George	16	Penrith	5	Leichhardt Oval	Result

== Semi finals ==
Date	Winner	Score	Loser	Score	Venue	Canberra Times
6/08/75	Eastern Suburbs	23	Auckland	10	Leichhardt Oval	Result
13/08/75	Parramatta	13	St George	6	Leichhardt Oval	Result

== Final ==
Date	Winner	Score	Loser	Score	Venue	Canberra Times
20/08/75	Eastern Suburbs	17	Parramatta	7	Leichhardt Oval	Report

- *- advanced after a penalty count-back

== Awards ==
=== Golden Try ===
- Bill Ashurst (Penrith)
