= 1974 Amco Cup =

1974 NSWRFL Midweek Cup
NSWRFL Amco Cup

Tournament details
- Dates: 10 April - 21 August 1974
- Teams: 21
- Venue(s): 4 (in 3 host cities)

Final positions
- Champions: Western Division (1st title)
- Runners-up: Penrith

Tournament statistics
- Matches played: 20

The 1974 Amco Cup was the 1st edition of the NSWRFL Midweek Cup, a NSWRFL-organised national club Rugby League tournament between the leading clubs and representative teams from the NSWRFL, the CRL and the NZRL.

A total of 21 teams from across New South Wales and New Zealand played 20 matches in a straight knock-out format, with the matches being held midweek during the premiership season.

The Competition was originally going to have the 12 NSWRFL Premiership teams, the top 4 Brisbane Rugby League teams and the top 4 Country Divisional teams from the previous year. But when the Brisbane Rugby League teams and the winner of the 1973 CRL Championship, Newcastle declined to participate in the tournament, the remaining CRL Divisional teams, the 1973 New Zealand Inter-District Premiers, Auckland and the 1973 NSWRFL Second Division Runners-Up, Ryde-Eastwood were invited to compete instead.

== Qualified Teams ==
Teams	League	Qualification
Manly-Warringah Sea Eagles	NSWRFL	1973 NSWRFL Premiership Winners
Cronulla-Sutherland Sharks	NSWRFL	1973 NSWRFL Runners-Up
Newtown Jets	NSWRFL	1973 NSWRFL Semi-finalists
St. George Dragons	NSWRFL	1973 NSWRFL Semi-finalists
Canterbury-Bankstown Berries	NSWRFL	1973 NSWRFL Semi-finalists
Eastern Suburbs Roosters	NSWRFL	1973 NSWRFL Sixth Place
South Sydney Rabbitohs	NSWRFL	1973 NSWRFL Seventh Place
North Sydney Bears	NSWRFL	1973 NSWRFL Eighth Place
Western Suburbs Magpies	NSWRFL	1973 NSWRFL Ninth Place
Balmain Tigers	NSWRFL	1973 NSWRFL Tenth Place
Parramatta Eels	NSWRFL	1973 NSWRFL Eleventh Place
Penrith Panthers	NSWRFL	1973 NSWRFL Twelfth Place
Ryde-Eastwood Hawks	NSWRFL	1973 NSWRFL Second Division Runners-Up^{1}
Southern Division (Capitals)	CRL	1973 CRL Championship Runners-Up
Riverina (Capitals)	CRL	1973 CRL Championship Semi-finalists
Northern Division (Capitals)	CRL	1973 CRL Championship Semi-finalists
Illawarra (Capitals)	CRL	1973 CRL Championship Fifth Place
Western Division (Capitals)	CRL	1973 CRL Championship Sixth Place
Monaro (Capitals)	CRL	1973 CRL Championship Seventh Place
North Coast (Capitals)	CRL	1973 CRL Championship Eighth Place
Auckland Falcons	NZRL	1973 NZRL Premiership Winners

^{1} Replaced Wentworthville who declined to participate.

== Venues ==
Sydney		Queanbeyan	Orange
Leichhardt Oval	Belmore Sports Ground	Seiffert Oval	Wade Park
Capacity: 23,000	Capacity: 28,000	Capacity: 20,000	Capacity: 10,000

== Round 1 ==
Home	Score	Away	Match Information
Home	Score	Away	Date	Venue	Referee
Eastern Suburbs Roosters	22 – 6	Western Suburbs Magpies	Wednesday, 10 April	Belmore Sports Ground	Greg Hartley
Parramatta	39 – 11	Riverina	Wednesday, 17 April	Leichhardt Oval	Laurie Bruyeres
North Sydney Bears	19 – 7	North Coast	Wednesday, 24 April	Leichhardt Oval	D. McDonald
Balmain Tigers	11 – 22	St George Dragons	Wednesday, 1 May	Leichhardt Oval	Keith Page
Penrith Panthers	18 – 10	Ryde-Eastwood Hawks	Wednesday, 8 May	Leichhardt Oval

== Round 2 ==
Home	Score	Away	Match Information
Home	Score	Away	Date	Venue	Referee
Newtown Jets	14 – 18	South Sydney Rabbitohs	Wednesday, 15 May	Leichhardt Oval
Manly-Warringah Sea Eagles	34 – 10	Parramatta	Wednesday, 22 May	Leichhardt Oval
Western Division	13 – 7	Auckland Falcons	Wednesday, 12 June	Leichhardt Oval	Laurie Bruyeres
Canterbury-Bankstown Berries	22 – 19	Illawarra	Wednesday, 19 June	Seiffert Oval	Keith Page
Monaro	21 – 32	Eastern Suburbs Roosters	Wednesday, 19 June	Seiffert Oval	Geoff Cook
Cronulla-Sutherland Sharks	14 – 15	Southern Division	Wednesday, 26 June	Leichhardt Oval	Laurie Bruyeres
North Sydney Bears	14 – 19	Northern Division	Wednesday, 3 July	Leichhardt Oval	Keith Holman
St George Dragons	3 – 14	Penrith Panthers	Wednesday, 17 July	Leichhardt Oval

== Finals ==
Home	Score	Away	Match Information
Home	Score	Away	Date and Time	Venue	Referees
Quarter-finals
Manly-Warringah Sea Eagles	22 – 7	South Sydney Rabbitohs	Wednesday, 10 July	Leichhardt Oval
Canterbury-Bankstown Berries	10 – 12	Western Division	Wednesday, 17 July	Leichhardt Oval	Keith Holman
Eastern Suburbs Roosters	18 – 10	Southern Division	Wednesday, 24 July	Leichhardt Oval	Les Ballard
Penrith Panthers	31 – 11	Northern Division	Wednesday, 31 July	Leichhardt Oval	Keith Page
Semi-finals
Western Division	12* – 12	Manly-Warringah Sea Eagles	Wednesday, 7 August	Wade Park	Jack Danzey
Eastern Suburbs Roosters	9 – 10	Penrith Panthers	Wednesday, 14 August	Leichhardt Oval
Final
Penrith Panthers	2 – 6	Western Division	Wednesday, 21 August	Leichhardt Oval	Laurie Bruyeres

- *- advanced after a penalty count-back

== Awards ==
=== Golden Try ===
- Malcolm Reilly (Manly-Warringah)
