= 1982 KB Cup =

1982 NSWRFL Midweek Cup
NSWRFL KB Cup

Tournament details
- Dates: 24 March - 11 August 1982
- Teams: 18
- Venue: 3 (in 3 host cities)

Final positions
- Champions: Manly-Warringah (1st title)
- Runners-up: Newtown

Tournament statistics
- Matches played: 24

The 1982 KB Cup was the 9th edition of the NSWRFL Midweek Cup, a NSWRFL-organised national club Rugby League tournament between the leading clubs and representative teams from the NSWRFL, the BRL, the CRL, the QRL and the NZRL.

A total of 18 teams from across Australia and New Zealand played 24 matches in a round-robin format with teams playing a round of games with the 2 lowest performing teams being eliminated before the remaining teams played another round of games with the top 8 teams advanced to a knockout stage, with the matches being held midweek during the premiership season.

== Qualified Teams ==
| Team | Nickname | League | Qualification | Participation (bold indicates winners) |
|---|---|---|---|---|
| Parramatta | Eels | NSWRFL | Winners of the 1981 New South Wales Rugby Football League Premiership | 9th (Previous: 1974, 1975, 1976, 1977, 1978, 1979, **1980**, 1981) |
| Newtown | Jets | NSWRFL | Runners-Up in the 1981 New South Wales Rugby Football League Premiership | 9th (Previous: 1974, 1975, 1976, 1977, 1978, 1979, 1980, 1981) |
| Eastern Suburbs | Roosters | NSWRFL | Third Place in the 1981 New South Wales Rugby Football League Premiership | 9th (Previous: 1974, **1975**, 1976, 1977, **1978**, 1979, 1980, 1981) |
| Manly-Warringah | Sea Eagles | NSWRFL | Fourth Place in the 1981 New South Wales Rugby Football League Premiership | 9th (Previous: 1974, 1975, 1976, 1977, 1978, 1979, 1980, 1981) |
| Cronulla-Sutherland | Sharks | NSWRFL | Fifth Place in the 1981 New South Wales Rugby Football League Premiership | 9th (Previous: 1974, 1975, 1976, 1977, 1978, **1979**, 1980, 1981) |
| Western Suburbs | Magpies | NSWRFL | Sixth Place in the 1981 New South Wales Rugby Football League Premiership | 9th (Previous: 1974, 1975, 1976, **1977**, 1978, 1979, 1980, 1981) |
| North Sydney | Bears | NSWRFL | Seventh Place in the 1981 New South Wales Rugby Football League Premiership | 9th (Previous: 1974, 1975, 1976, 1977, 1978, 1979, 1980, 1981) |
| St. George | Dragons | NSWRFL | Eighth Place in the 1981 New South Wales Rugby Football League Premiership | 9th (Previous: 1974, 1975, 1976, 1977, 1978, 1979, 1980, 1981) |
| South Sydney | Rabbitohs | NSWRFL | Ninth Place in the 1981 New South Wales Rugby Football League Premiership | 9th (Previous: 1974, 1975, 1976, 1977, 1978, 1979, 1980, **1981**) |
| Canterbury-Bankstown | Bulldogs | NSWRFL | Tenth Place in the 1981 New South Wales Rugby Football League Premiership | 9th (Previous: 1974, 1975, 1976, 1977, 1978, 1979, 1980, 1981) |
| Penrith | Panthers | NSWRFL | Eleventh Place in the 1981 New South Wales Rugby Football League Premiership | 9th (Previous: 1974, 1975, 1976, 1977, 1978, 1979, 1980, 1981) |
| Balmain | Tigers | NSWRFL | Twelfth Place in the 1981 New South Wales Rugby Football League Premiership | 9th (Previous: 1974, 1975, **1976**, 1977, 1978, 1979, 1980, 1981) |
| Canberra | Raiders | NSWRFL | NSWRFL Expansion Team | 1st |
| Illawarra | Steelers | NSWRFL | NSWRFL Expansion Team | 1st |
| Brisbane | Poinsettias | BRL | League Representative Team | 4th (Previous: 1979, 1980, 1981) |
| NSW Country | Kangaroos | CRL | Country League Representative Team | 4th (Previous: 1979, 1980, 1981) |
| Queensland Country | Maroons | QRL | Country League Representative Team | 4th (Previous: 1979, 1980, 1981) |
| South Island | Scorpions | NZRL | Winners of the 1981 New Zealand Rugby League Inter-District Premiership | 1st |

== Venues ==
| Sydney | Brisbane | Tweed Heads |
|---|---|---|
| Leichhardt Oval | Lang Park | Chris Cunningham Field |
| Capacity: 23,000 | Capacity: 45,000 | Capacity: 13,500 |

== Round 1 ==
| Date | Winner | Score | Loser | Score | Venue | Man of the Match |
|---|---|---|---|---|---|---|
| 24/03/82 | Eastern Suburbs | 12 | Western Suburbs | 0 | Leichhardt Oval | Marty Gurr & Des O'Reilly - Eastern Suburbs |
| 31/03/82 | South Sydney | 18 | North Sydney | 10 | Leichhardt Oval | Tony Melrose - South Sydney |
| 7/04/82 | Manly-Warringah | 47 | Illawarra | 20 | Leichhardt Oval | Mike Eden - Manly-Warringah |
| 14/04/82 | Canberra | 27 | South Island (NZ) | 15 | Leichhardt Oval | Jay Hoffman - Canberra |
| 21/04/82 | St George | 26 | QLD Country | 10 | Lang Park | Rohan Hancock - QLD Country |
| 21/04/82 | Balmain | 13 | Combined Brisbane | 10 | Lang Park | Gary Bridge - Balmain |
| 28/04/82 | Penrith | 16 | Parramatta | 7 | Chris Cunningham Field | Kevin Dann - Penrith |
| 5/05/82 | Newtown | 26 | Canterbury-Bankstown | 5 | Leichhardt Oval | Steve Bowden - Newtown |
| 26/05/82 | Cronulla-Sutherland | 15 | NSW Country | 2 | Leichhardt Oval | Dane Sorensen - Cronulla-Sutherland |

| Club | Played | Won | Lost | Drawn | For | Against | Diff. | Points |
|---|---|---|---|---|---|---|---|---|
| Manly-Warringah | 1 | 1 | 0 | 0 | 47 | 20 | 27 | 2 |
| Newtown | 1 | 1 | 0 | 0 | 26 | 5 | 21 | 2 |
| St George | 1 | 1 | 0 | 0 | 26 | 10 | 16 | 2 |
| Cronulla-Sutherland | 1 | 1 | 0 | 0 | 15 | 2 | 13 | 2 |
| Eastern Suburbs | 1 | 1 | 0 | 0 | 12 | 0 | 12 | 2 |
| Canberra | 1 | 1 | 0 | 0 | 27 | 15 | 12 | 2 |
| Penrith | 1 | 1 | 0 | 0 | 16 | 7 | 9 | 2 |
| South Sydney | 1 | 1 | 0 | 0 | 18 | 10 | 8 | 2 |
| Balmain | 1 | 1 | 0 | 0 | 13 | 10 | 3 | 2 |
| Combined Brisbane | 1 | 0 | 1 | 0 | 10 | 13 | -3 | 0 |
| North Sydney | 1 | 0 | 1 | 0 | 10 | 18 | -8 | 0 |
| Parramatta | 1 | 0 | 1 | 0 | 7 | 16 | -9 | 0 |
| South Island | 1 | 0 | 1 | 0 | 15 | 27 | -12 | 0 |
| Western Suburbs | 1 | 0 | 1 | 0 | 0 | 12 | -12 | 0 |
| NSW Country | 1 | 0 | 1 | 0 | 2 | 15 | -13 | 0 |
| QLD Country | 1 | 0 | 1 | 0 | 10 | 26 | -16 | 0 |
| Canterbury-Bankstown | 1 | 0 | 1 | 0 | 5 | 26 | -21 | 0 |
| Illawarra | 1 | 0 | 1 | 0 | 20 | 47 | -27 | 0 |

Canterbury-Bankstown and Illawarra eliminated.

== Round 2 ==
The original second round draw saw Cronulla-Sutherland play Canterbury-Bankstown and Canberra play Illawarra. That was amended because under the competition guidelines, the 2 teams that were placed last after round 1 were eliminated. The amended draw is listed below.

| Date | Winner | Score | Loser | Score | Venue | Man of the Match |
|---|---|---|---|---|---|---|
| 12/05/82 | Manly-Warringah | 22 | North Sydney | 15 | Leichhardt Oval | Paul Vautin - Manly-Warringah |
| 19/05/82 | South Sydney * | 6 | Penrith | 6 | Leichhardt Oval | Royce Simmons - Penrith |
| 2/06/82 | Balmain | 24 | Eastern Suburbs | 11 | Leichhardt Oval | Greg Lane - Balmain |
| 9/06/82 | Western Suburbs | 20 | St George | 11 | Leichhardt Oval | Terry Lamb - Western Suburbs |
| 15/06/82 | Newtown | 43 | QLD Country | 2 | Lang Park | Phil Sigsworth - Newtown |
| 15/06/82 | Combined Brisbane | 34 | South Island | 3 | Lang Park | Brett French - Combined Brisbane |
| 16/06/82 | Parramatta | 41 | NSW Country | 3 | Leichhardt Oval | John Muggleton - Parramatta |
| 23/06/82 | Cronulla-Sutherland | 25 | Canberra | 11 | Leichhardt Oval | Perry Haddock - Cronulla-Sutherland |

| Club | Played | Won | Lost | Drawn | For | Against | Diff. | Points |
|---|---|---|---|---|---|---|---|---|
| Newtown | 2 | 2 | 0 | 0 | 69 | 7 | 62 | 4 |
| Manly-Warringah | 2 | 2 | 0 | 0 | 69 | 35 | 34 | 4 |
| Cronulla-Sutherland | 2 | 2 | 0 | 0 | 40 | 13 | 27 | 4 |
| Balmain | 2 | 2 | 0 | 0 | 37 | 21 | 16 | 4 |
| South Sydney | 2 | 2 | 0 | 0 | 24 | 16 | 8 | 4 |
| Parramatta | 2 | 1 | 1 | 0 | 48 | 19 | 29 | 2 |
| Combined Brisbane | 2 | 1 | 1 | 0 | 44 | 16 | 28 | 2 |
| Penrith | 2 | 1 | 1 | 0 | 22 | 13 | 9 | 2 |
| St George | 2 | 1 | 1 | 0 | 37 | 30 | 7 | 2 |
| Eastern Suburbs | 2 | 1 | 1 | 0 | 23 | 24 | -1 | 2 |
| Canberra | 2 | 1 | 1 | 0 | 38 | 40 | -2 | 2 |
| Western Suburbs | 2 | 1 | 1 | 0 | 20 | 23 | -3 | 2 |
| North Sydney | 2 | 0 | 2 | 0 | 25 | 40 | -15 | 0 |
| South Island | 2 | 0 | 2 | 0 | 18 | 61 | -43 | 0 |
| NSW Country | 2 | 0 | 2 | 0 | 5 | 56 | -51 | 0 |
| QLD Country | 2 | 0 | 2 | 0 | 12 | 69 | -57 | 0 |
| Canterbury-Bankstown | 1 | 0 | 1 | 0 | 5 | 26 | -21 | 0 |
| Illawarra | 1 | 0 | 1 | 0 | 20 | 47 | -27 | 0 |

== Quarter finals ==
| Date | Winner | Score | Loser | Score | Venue | Man of the Match |
|---|---|---|---|---|---|---|
| 30/06/82 | South Sydney | 19 | Balmain | 2 | Leichhardt Oval | Peter Tunks - South Sydney |
| 7/07/82 | Manly-Warringah | 17 | Penrith | 14 | Leichhardt Oval | Rod Wright - Penrith |
| 14/07/82 | Newtown | 7 | Cronulla-Sutherland | 2 | Leichhardt Oval | John Ferguson - Newtown |
| 21/07/82 | Parramatta | 25 | Combined Brisbane | 7 | Lang Park | Brett Kenny - Parramatta |

== Semi finals ==
| Date | Winner | Score | Loser | Score | Venue | Man of the Match |
|---|---|---|---|---|---|---|
| 28/07/82 | Newtown * | 8 | South Sydney | 8 | Leichhardt Oval | Shane Arneil - South Sydney |
| 4/08/82 | Manly-Warringah | 24 | Parramatta | 10 | Leichhardt Oval | Mike Eden - Manly-Warringah |

- *- Progressed on penalty count-back

== Final ==
| Date | Winner | Score | Loser | Score | Venue | Man of the Match |
|---|---|---|---|---|---|---|
| 11 August 1982 | Manly-Warringah | 23 | Newtown | 8 | Leichhardt Oval | Graham Eadie - Manly-Warringah |

Named Teams:

Manly-Warringah: 1.Graham Eadie, 2. John Ribot, 3. Phil Blake, 4. Michael Blake, 5. Simon Booth, 6. Alan Thompson, 7. Mike Eden, 8. Bruce Walker, 9. Les Boyd, 10. Paul McCabe, 11. Mark Broadhurst, 12. Max Krilich (c), 13. Geoff Gerard. Res – 14. Paul Vautin, 15. Chris Close, 16. Ray Brown, 17. Ian Thomson. Coach – Ray Ritchie.

Newtown: 1. Phil Sigsworth, 2. John Ferguson, 3. Mick Ryan, 4. Allan McMahon, 5. Mal Graham, 6. Dean Lance, 7. Tom Raudonikis, 8. Graeme O'Grady, 9. Mick Pitman, 10. Col Murphy, 11. Craig Ellis, 12. Mark Bugden, 13. Steve Bowden. Res - 14. Ken Wilson, 15. Ron Sigsworth, 16. Peter Kelly, 17. John Mackay. Coach - Warren Ryan.

Manly-Warringah 23 (Ribot, P.Blake, M.Blake, Booth tries, Eden 4, Eadie goals, Eden field goal) d Newtown 8 (Graham, Lance tries, Wilson goal). Crowd: 14,490.

=== Player of the Series ===
- Mike Eden (Manly-Warringah)

=== Golden Try ===
- Phil Blake (Manly-Warringah)

== Sources ==
- http://www.rugbyleagueproject.org/
