= 1982 Kangaroo tour of Great Britain and France =

1982 rugby league tour

1982 Kangaroos tour
- Date: 10 October 1982 – 18 December 1982
- Manager: Frank Farrington
- Coach(es): Frank Stanton
- Tour captain(s): Max Krilich
- Top point scorer(s): Mal Meninga (158)
- Top try scorer(s): Steve Ella (22)
Summary
P	W	D	L
Total
22	22	0	0
Test match
5	5	0	0
Opponent
P	W	D	L
Great Britain
3	3	0	0
France
2	2	0	0

Tour chronology
- Previous tour: 1978
- Next tour: 1986

The 1982 Kangaroo tour was the fifteenth Kangaroo tour where the Australian national rugby league team played a number of matches against British and French rugby league teams, in addition to the Test matches. The Australia national rugby league team have generally since 1908 barring wartime, toured Great Britain every four years often capping the tour with matches and Tests in France. This regular touring side (and in recent years all Australian representative sides) are known as the Kangaroos.

The 1982 Kangaroos, coached by Frank Stanton dominated, winning both Test series against Great Britain (three Tests) and France (two Tests); winning every match of the tour and earning the nickname The Invincibles. This was the first Kangaroo undefeated touring side winning twenty-two matches played and scoring 1,005 points with 120 against at an average of 45.6 points per game while conceding only 5.4 points per game. The twenty-eight player squad was captained by Max Krilich, with Wally Lewis his deputy. The next Kangaroo Tour was staged in 1986.

== Touring party ==
The team was coached by Balmain Tigers coach Frank Stanton who was making his third tour. Stanton's first tour came as a player in 1963–64, this was his second consecutive as coach after also coaching the 1978 Kangaroo tour. Manly-Warringah's Max Krilich was making his second Kangaroo tour and was named captain. Queensland captain Wally Lewis was named as tour vice-captain.

Interviewed by journalist/author Ian Whiticker in 2004 Krilich said about the talented squad; "The players in that squad were yet to reach their full potential. We were criticised as a weak side, but nobody knew how great a player Wayne Pearce was going to be on the tour. Wally Lewis was still in his early 20s, and many of the Queenslanders were in the early stages of their careers". He also spoke of Stanton (who was his Manly-Warringah club coach when he had won the 1976 and 1978 NSWRFL premierships, the second of which Krilich was captain of the Sea Eagles): "Frank was a mentally tough coach who totally believed in what he told his players. Great credit must go to Stanton who played down the accomplishment and kept our heads straight."

While the pair did not enjoy an easy relationship, mostly due to Stanton not being impressed with his attitude to training or habits on tour which actually caused him to put on weight, Wally Lewis also found respect for Stanton he had not previously experienced after making his test debut under him against France in 1981. After missing selection for the first Test in Hull in favour of Parramatta's 1982 premiership winning Five-eighth Brett Kenny (Lewis was selected on an extended bench but wasn't used), Stanton challenged Lewis to get back into shape and win his way back into the Test team, something he achieved with selection on the bench for the second Test in Wigan and the third Test in Leeds. Lewis later admitted that early on in the tour his poor attitude did not sit well with Stanton and that it had led to his missing first test selection. Although this was his first Kangaroo Tour, it was not the first tour of Great Britain and France for Lewis who had been a member of the 1977 Australian Schoolboys rugby union tour of Japan, Great Britain and France, a team that included future dual-rugby international Michael O'Connor as well as the Ella brothers Mark, Gary and Glen, cousins of 1982 tourist Steve Ella.

Six players from the 1982 NSWRL premiership winning Parramatta Eels were selected in the squad, a new Kangaroo tour record for the club with all six players playing in at least one test each on the tour. Manly, the team they defeated in the inaugural Winfield Cup Grand Final, also had six players selected. One Manly player considered unlucky not to tour was their Queensland back rower Paul Vautin who had made his test debut earlier in the year against New Zealand and was one of Manly's best in their run to the Grand Final. Max Krilich later would tell that it was his belief that Vautin's comment during the year that representing Queensland was a bigger honour than playing for Australia had ultimately cost him a place on the tour. Ironically, Vautin would be back in the test team for the tests against New Zealand in 1983. 1982 Brisbane premiers Wynnum-Manly had two players selected (Gene Miles and Rod Morris), while the team they defeated in the BRL Grand Final Souths Magpies were represented by Mal Meninga, a goal kicking Queensland centre who was as big as a second rower (107 kg (16 st 12 lb)) and could run with the pace of a winger.

One notable absentee was Western Suburbs Five-eighth Terry Lamb who had represented NSW in the 1981 State of Origin game. Lamb was originally selected to tour but declined to do so due to his upcoming wedding to his fiancé Kim.

Tour managers were the Newtown administrator Frank Farrington and Queenslands, Tom Drysdale. Open Rugby magazine claimed the Australians had brought "a new dimension of excitement and adventure" to the game and former England great Alex Murphy, who called each test for the BBC alongside Ray French, called then "men from another planet."

This was the first Kangaroo tour since the introduction of State of Origin and it allowed Queensland to counter New South Wales' long dominance in representative selection with a record-equalling eleven Queenslanders selected for the tour. This was a considerable increase on the Queensland representation in the 1978 Kangaroos when only three players were selected. Two of those players, Kerry Boustead and Rod Morris, were also members of the 1982 Kangaroos.

Despite there being a record number, the selection of only 11 Queenslander's in the 28 man touring squad was controversial. Queensland had won the 1982 State of Origin series despite being comparatively under prepared due to the NSWRFL clubs refusing to release their Queensland players for pre-series training. Among the Queensland Origin representatives to miss selection were Manly-Warringah's Paul Vautin and Chris Close (who had been the Man of the Match in both Origin games in 1980 and 1981), Wynnum-Manly fullback Colin Scott and South Sydney outside back Mitch Brennan.

Future Kangaroos captain Mal Meninga, making the first of his record four consecutive Kangaroo Tours, was the leading point scorer on tour with 166 from 10 tries and 68 goals, including 48 points in the three Tests against Great Britain (2 tries, 21 goals), and 17 points in the two Tests against France (1 try, 7 goals). John Ribot was the leading try scorer on tour with 25 from just 14 games, including a try in the 3rd test against Great Britain. Ribot added 20 goals to his points tally to join Meninga as the only players on tour to score over 100 points. Meninga's second rowers size coupled with his wingers pace made him a sensation on the tour. He was often bigger than the British forwards Australia played and he could also score length of the field tries. His signature became much sought after both during and after the Kangaroo tour with multiple clubs chasing him. Ultimately he would go on to sign for a season with St Helens in 1984–85 where he would replicate his 1982 tour form to the delight of Saints fans.

Player	Club	Position(s)	Tests	Matches	Tries	Goals	F/Goals	Points
(New South Wales) Chris Anderson	Canterbury-Bankstown Bulldogs	Wing	0	12	8	0	0	24
(Queensland) Kerry Boustead	Eastern Suburbs Roosters	Wing	6	13	9	0	0	27
(New South Wales) Les Boyd	Manly-Warringah Sea Eagles	Second-row, Prop	3	14	3	0	0	9
(New South Wales) Greg Brentnall	Canterbury-Bankstown Bulldogs	Fullback	6	13	3	0	0	9
(New South Wales) Ray Brown	Manly-Warringah Sea Eagles	Hooker	0	14	0	0	0	0
(Queensland) Greg Conescu	Norths Devils (Qld)	Hooker	0	14	2	1	0	8
(New South Wales) Steve Ella	Parramatta Eels	Centre, Fullback	0	13	21	1	0	65
(New South Wales) Eric Grothe	Parramatta Eels	Wing	4	14	21	1	0	65
(Queensland) Rohan Hancock	Warwick Wattles (Qld)	Prop	1	10	0	0	0	0
(New South Wales) Brett Kenny	Parramatta Eels	Five-eighth	6	12	6	0	0	18
(New South Wales) Max Krilich (c)	Manly-Warringah Sea Eagles	Hooker	6	12	1	0	0	3
(Queensland) Wally Lewis (vc)	Fortitude Valley Diehards (Qld)	Five-eighth, Centre	3	14	3	9	0	27
(New South Wales) Paul McCabe	Manly-Warringah Sea Eagles	Second-row	3	13	7	0	0	21
(New South Wales) Don McKinnon	North Sydney Bears	Prop	0	10	3	1	0	11
(Queensland) Mal Meninga	Souths Logan Magpies (Qld)	Centre, Wing	6	14	10	68	0	166
(Queensland) Gene Miles	Wynnum-Manly Seagulls (Qld)	Centre	0	11	1	0	0	3
(Queensland) Rod Morris	Wynnum-Manly Seagulls (Qld)	Prop	0	12	0	0	0	0
(New South Wales) Steve Mortimer	Canterbury-Bankstown Bulldogs	Halfback	0	9	6	1	0	20
(New South Wales) John Muggleton	Parramatta Eels	Second-row	1	14	9	0	0	27
(Queensland) Mark Murray	Fortitude Valley Diehards (Qld)	Halfback, Five-eighth	0	10	4	1	0	14
(New South Wales) Wayne Pearce	Balmain Tigers	Lock, Second-row	5	13	5	0	0	15
(New South Wales) Ray Price	Parramatta Eels	Lock	3	9	2	0	0	6
(Queensland) John Ribot	Manly-Warringah Sea Eagles	Wing	2	14	25	20	0	115
(Queensland) Rod Reddy	St George Dragons	Second-row	4	12	2	0	0	6
(New South Wales) Steve Rogers	Cronulla-Sutherland Sharks	Centre	5	16	10	7	0	44
(New South Wales) Ian Schubert	Eastern Suburbs Roosters	Fullback, Lock, Second-row	0	12	3	0	0	9
(New South Wales) Peter Sterling	Parramatta Eels	Halfback	5	12	8	0	0	24
(New South Wales) Craig Young	St George Dragons	Prop	4	11	1	0	0	3

=== By club ===
The touring side was represented by 17 New South Welshmen (N) and 11 Queenslanders (Q).

- Manly-Warringah Sea Eagles (5): Max Krilich (captain) (N), John Ribot (Q), Les Boyd (N), Paul McCabe (Q), Ray Brown (N)
- Parramatta Eels (6): Brett Kenny (N), Peter Sterling (N), Steve Ella (N), Eric Grothe (N), Ray Price (N), John Muggleton (N)
- Canterbury Bulldogs (3): Greg Brentnall (N), Chris Anderson (N), Steve Mortimer (N)
- Fortitude Valley Diehards (2): Wally Lewis (vice-captain) (Q), Mark Murray (Q)
- St George Dragons (2): Rod Reddy (Q), Craig Young (N)
- Wynnum-Manly Seagulls (2): Gene Miles (Q), Rod Morris (Q)
- Balmain Tigers (1): Wayne Pearce (N)
- Cronulla-Sutherland Sharks (1): Steve Rogers (N)
- Eastern Suburbs Roosters (2): Ian Schubert (N), Kerry Boustead (Q)
- Norths Devils (1): Greg Conescu (Q)
- North Sydney Bears (1): Don McKinnon (N)
- Souths Magpies (1): Mal Meninga (Q)
- Warwick Wattles (1): Rohan Hancock (Q)

== Papua New Guinea and Western Australia ==
Before flying to England, half the squad, led by Kangaroos vice-captain Wally Lewis, went to Perth to play Western Australia, while the other half, along with coach Stanton, travelled to Papua New Guinea for Australia's first ever Test match against the Papua New Guinea Kumuls, won 38–2 by the Kangaroos. Nine of the players who travelled to PNG with Stanton would go on to play in the first Test against Great Britain. Winger John Ribot crossed for four tries (though he would be overlooked for the first two Ashes Tests in favour of Eric Grothe), while fullback Greg Brentnall scored twice. Other try scorers for the Kangaroos were Kerry Boustead, Brett Kenny, Mal Meninga and Steve Rogers, while Meninga kicked 4 goals. Peter Sterling, Brett Kenny, Mark Murray and Ray Brown made their test debuts in the match.

Those missing from the 2nd test win over New Zealand earlier in the year at the Sydney Cricket Ground were Michael Cronin who did not tour, and Wally Lewis, Steve Mortimer, Les Boyd and Rod Morris who played in Perth on the same day. Of the quartet that played in Perth, only Boyd would go on to play in the first test against Great Britain.

Saturday, 2 October 1982

Papua New Guinea	2–38	Australia
Tries: Goals: Kungas Kuveu (1/2)		Tries: John Ribot (4); Greg Brentnall (2); Kerry Boustead; Brett Kenny; Mal Meninga; Steve Rogers; Goals: Mal Meninga (4/10)

Lloyd Robson Oval, Port Moresby
Attendance: 15,000
Referee: Don Wilson (New Zealand)

Papua New Guinea	Australia

FB	1	Kungas Kuveu
RW	2	Alan Rero
CE	3	Ifiso Segeyaro
CE	4	James Yip
LW	5	D. Timi
FE	6	Jon Joseph (c)
HB	7	Alfred Kabavas
PR	8	Tara Gau
HK	9	Otti Asotau
PR	10	Joe Tep
SR	11	Arebo Taumaku
SR	12	L. Tete
LK	13	Roy Loitive
Substitutions:
IC	14	Francis Matmillo
IC	15	Ekon Togili
Coach:
(Papua New Guinea) Skerry Palanga

FB	1	Greg Brentnall
LW	2	John Ribot
CE	3	Mal Meninga
CE	4	Steve Rogers
RW	5	Kerry Boustead
FE	6	Brett Kenny
HB	7	Peter Sterling
PR	8	Craig Young
HK	9	Max Krilich (c)
PR	10	Rohan Hancock
SR	11	John Muggleton
SR	12	{ Rod Reddy
LK	13	Ray Price
Substitutions:
IC	14	Mark Murray
IC	15	Ray Brown
Coach:
(Australia) Frank Stanton

Saturday, 2 October

Western Australia	5–57	Australia
Tries: Mick Rasmussen; Goals: P. Harrison (1)		Tries: Eric Grothe (4), Ian Schubert (2), Chris Anderson, Greg Conescu, Steve Ella, Gene Miles, Rod Morris, Paul McCabe, Wayne Pearce; Goals: Wally Lewis (4); Steve Ella (3); Les Boyd (2)

Cannington Raceway, Perth
Attendance: 3,000

Western Australia	Australia

FB	1
RW	2
CE	3
CE	4
LW	5
FE	6
HB	7
PR	8
HK	9
PR	10
SR	11
SR	12
LK	13
Substitutions:
IC	14
IC	15
Coach:

FB	1	Ian Schubert
LW	2	Eric Grothe
CE	3	Steve Ella
CE	4	Gene Miles
RW	5	Chris Anderson
FE	6	Wally Lewis (c)
HB	7	Steve Mortimer
PR	8	Rod Morris
HK	9	Greg Conescu
PR	10	Don McKinnon
SR	11	Les Boyd
SR	12	Paul McCabe
LK	13	Wayne Pearce
Substitutions:
IC	14
IC	15
Coach:

In Perth, the Kangaroos crossed for 13 tries (with Eric Grothe bagging four) and predictably defeated WA 57–5.

== Great Britain ==
Once on English soil controversy surfaced when the incumbent Australian Test halves from the mid-year tests against New Zealand, Steve Mortimer and Wally Lewis (both had played the game against WA in Perth), were incomprehensibly not chosen for the opening match. Instead, Stanton chose to go with the halves from the test against Papua New Guinea, Parramatta's Grand Final winning duo Peter Sterling and Brett Kenny. The Eels pair took the field against Hull Kingston Rovers and, playing alongside nine of the eventual first Test team, set about locking up their positions for the first Test on 30 October.

Leading up to the first Test at the Boothferry Park ground in Hull, the Kangaroos also played a tour international match against Wales at Ninian Park in Cardiff on 24 October. The match was played in heavy rain in front of 5,617 fans and Australia, captained by Wally Lewis, ran in nine tries to one in a 37–7 rout. The game marked the first time Lewis, who would take over the Test captaincy in 1984, captained Australia in an international match.

Fiery forward Les Boyd enhanced his reputation for the rough play when he was sent off twice on tour. He was sent off in the first game of the tour against Hull Kingston Rovers at Craven Park, and in the second Test against the Lions at Central Park in Wigan. He was also sin-binned in the third Ashes Test at Headingley in Leeds.

=== Test Venues ===
The three Ashes series tests took place at the following venues.

Hull	Wigan	Leeds
Boothferry Park	Central Park	Headingley
Capacity: 26,800	Capacity: 37,000	Capacity: 30,000

Sunday, 10 October

Hull Kingston Rovers	10–30	Australia
Tries: Steve Hartley, Gary Prohm; Goals: George Fairbairn (2)		Tries: Peter Sterling (2), Wally Lewis, Mal Meninga, Steve Rogers, Craig Young; Goals: Mal Meninga (6)

Craven Park, Hull
Attendance: 10,742
Referee: Fred Lindop
Player of the Match: Mal Meninga

Hull Kingston Rovers	Australia

FB	1	George Fairbairn (c)
RW	2	Steve Hubbard
CE	3	Mike Smith
CE	4	Ian Robinson
LW	5	Garry Clark
SO	6	Steve Hartley
SH	7	James Walsh
PR	8	Roy Holdstock
HK	9	David Watkinson
PR	10	Steve Crooks
SR	11	Andy Kelly
SR	12	Chris Burton
LF	13	Gary Prohm
Substitutions:
IC	14	Phil Lowe
IC	15
Coach:
(England) Roger Millward

FB	1	Greg Brentnall
RW	2	Eric Grothe
CE	3	Mal Meninga
CE	4	Steve Rogers
LW	5	John Ribot
FE	6	Brett Kenny
HB	7	Peter Sterling
PR	8	Craig Young
HK	9	Max Krilich (c)
PR	10	Rod Morris
SR	11	Les Boyd
SR	12	Rod Reddy
LF	13	Ray Price
Substitutions:
IC	14	Wally Lewis
IC	15	John Muggleton
Coach:
(Australia) Frank Stanton

Hull KR led the Kangaroos 8–5 at half time but that was as good as it got for Roger Millward's men as the Kangaroos piled on 25 points to just 2 in the second half to run out easy 30–10 winners. Man of the Match Mal Meninga lit up Craven Park on his first taste of football on English soil, scoring a try and kicking 6 goals in the win.

Wednesday, 13 October

Wigan	9–13	Australia
Tries: Henderson Gill; Goals: Colin Whitfield (3)		Tries: Kerry Boustead, John Muggleton, Paul McCabe; Goals: Steve Ella (2)

Central Park, Wigan
Attendance: 12,158
Referee: Gerry Kershaw

Wigan	Australia

FB	1	Barry Williams
RW	2	Dennis Ramsdale
CE	3	David Stephenson
CE	4	Colin Whitfield
LW	5	Henderson Gill
SO	6	Martin Foy
SH	7	Gary Stephens (c)
PR	8	Lee Bamber
HK	9	Nicky Kiss
PR	10	Glyn Shaw
SR	11	Brian Juliff
SR	12	Mick Scott
LF	13	John Pendlebury
Substitutions:
IC	14	Jimmy Fairhurst
IC	15	Danny Campbell
Coach:
(England) Alex Murphy

FB	1	Ian Schubert
RW	2	Chris Anderson
CE	3	Steve Ella
CE	4	Gene Miles
LW	5	Kerry Boustead
FE	6	Wally Lewis (c)
HB	7	Steve Mortimer
PR	8	Don McKinnon
HK	9	Ray Brown
PR	10	Rohan Hancock
SR	11	Paul McCabe
SR	12	John Muggleton
LF	13	Wayne Pearce
Substitutions:
IC	14	Steve Rogers
IC	15	Ray Price
Coach:
(Australia) Frank Stanton

Friday, 15 October

Barrow	2–29	Australia
Tries: Goals: Steve Tickle (1)		Tries: Ian Schubert (2), Greg Conescu, Steve Ella, Mark Murray, Wayne Pearce, Steve Rogers; Goals: Wally Lewis (3); Steve Rogers (1)

Craven Park, Barrow
Attendance: 6,282
Referee: Derek Fox

Barrow	Australia

FB	1	Steve Tickle
RW	2	Keith Bentley
CE	3	Ron O'Regan
CE	4	Ralph McConnell
LW	5	Michael James
SO	6	Mel Mason (c)
SH	7	David Cairns
PR	8	Malcolm Flynn
HK	9	Les Wall
PR	10	Peter Gee
SR	11	Eddie Szymala
SR	12	Mark Gillespie
LF	13	Derek Hadley
Substitutions:
IC	14	Steve Herbert
IC	15
Coach:
(England) Frank Foster

FB	1	Ian Schubert
RW	2	Chris Anderson
CE	3	Steve Ella
CE	4	Gene Miles
LW	5	John Ribot
FE	6	Wally Lewis (c)
HB	7	Mark Murray
PR	8	Rohan Hancock
HK	9	Greg Conescu
PR	10	Rod Morris
SR	11	Les Boyd
SR	12	Rod Reddy
LF	13	Wayne Pearce
Substitutions:
IC	14	Ray Brown
IC	15	Steve Rogers
Coach:
(Australia) Frank Stanton

Sunday, 17 October

St. Helens	0–32	Australia
Tries: Goals:		Tries: Kerry Boustead (2), Les Boyd (2), Eric Grothe (2), Steve Rogers, Peter Sterling; Goals: Mal Meninga (4/8)

Knowsley Road, St. Helens
Attendance: 8,190
Referee: Robin Whitfield
Player of the Match: Les Boyd (Australia)

St Helens	Australia

FB	1	Clive Griffiths
RW	2	Barry Ledger
CE	3	Chris Arkwright
CE	4	David Fairclough
LW	5	Denis Litherland
SO	6	Stephen Peters
SH	7	Neil Holding
PR	8	Mel James
HK	9	Michael Glover
PR	10	Brian Gelling
SR	11	Roy Mathias (c)
SR	12	Paul Forber
LF	13	Andy Platt
Substitutions:
IC	14	John Smith
IC	15	Paul Brownbill
Coach:
(England) Billy Benyon

FB	1	Greg Brentnall
RW	2	Kerry Boustead
CE	3	Mal Meninga
CE	4	Steve Rogers
LW	5	Eric Grothe
FE	6	Brett Kenny
HB	7	Peter Sterling
PR	8	Craig Young
HK	9	Max Krilich (c)
PR	10	Les Boyd
SR	11	Wayne Pearce
SR	12	John Muggleton
LF	13	Ray Price
Substitutions:
IC	14	Wally Lewis
IC	15	Rod Morris
Coach:
(Australia) Frank Stanton

Wednesday, 20 October

Leeds	4–31	Australia
Tries: Goals: Mark Conway (2)		Tries: Steve Ella (2), Mal Meninga (2), Kerry Boustead, Eric Grothe, Steve Rogers; Goals: Mal Meninga (5)

Headingley, Leeds
Attendance: 11,570
Referee: Billy Thompson
Player of the Match: Wayne Pearce (Australia)

Leeds	Australia

FB	1	Neil Hague
RW	2	Alan Smith
CE	3	Ian Wilkinson
CE	4	Les Dyl
LW	5	Andrew Smith
SO	6	John Holmes
SH	7	Mark Conway
PR	8	Roy Dickinson
HK	9	David Ward (c)
PR	10	Tony Burke
SR	11	Keith Rayne
SR	12	Wayne Heron
LF	13	David Heron
Substitutions:
IC	14	Mark Massa
IC	15	Andrew Sykes
Coach:
(England) Robin Dewhurst

FB	1	Greg Brentnall
RW	2	Kerry Boustead
CE	3	Mal Meninga
CE	4	Steve Rogers
LW	5	Eric Grothe
FE	6	Brett Kenny
HB	7	Peter Sterling
PR	8	Craig Young
HK	9	Max Krilich (c)
PR	10	Les Boyd
SR	11	Paul McCabe
SR	12	John Muggleton
LF	13	Wayne Pearce
Substitutions:
IC	14	Steve Ella
IC	15	Rod Morris
Coach:
(Australia) Frank Stanton

=== Wales ===
The Kangaroos played a non-test international against Wales at Ninian Park in Cardiff. This was the first time Wally Lewis (playing in the unfamiliar position of centre) would captain Australia against an international team. The Kangaroos would not play Wales again until 1994, that game also at Ninian Park.

Sunday, 24 October 1982

Wales	7–37	Australia
Tries: Brynmor Williams Goals: Steve Fenwick (1); Lynn Hopkins (1)		Tries: Steve Ella (4); John Ribot (2); Wally Lewis; Mark Murray; Don McKinnon; Goals: Wally Lewis (4); Don McKinnon (1)

Ninian Park, Cardiff
Attendance: 5,617
Referee: Gerry Kershaw (England)
Player of the Match: Steve Ella

Wales	Australia

FB	1	Lynn Hopkins
RW	2	Chris Camilleri
CE	3	Steve Fenwick
CE	4	John Bevan (c)
LW	5	Paul Prendiville
SO	6	Lynn Hallett
SH	7	Brynmor Williams
PR	8	Glyn Shaw
HK	9	Donald Parry
PR	10	Tommy David
SR	11	Martin Herdman
SR	12	Brian Juliff
LF	13	Paul Ringer
Substitutions:
IC	14	Mark McJennett
IC	15
Coach:
(Wales) David Watkins

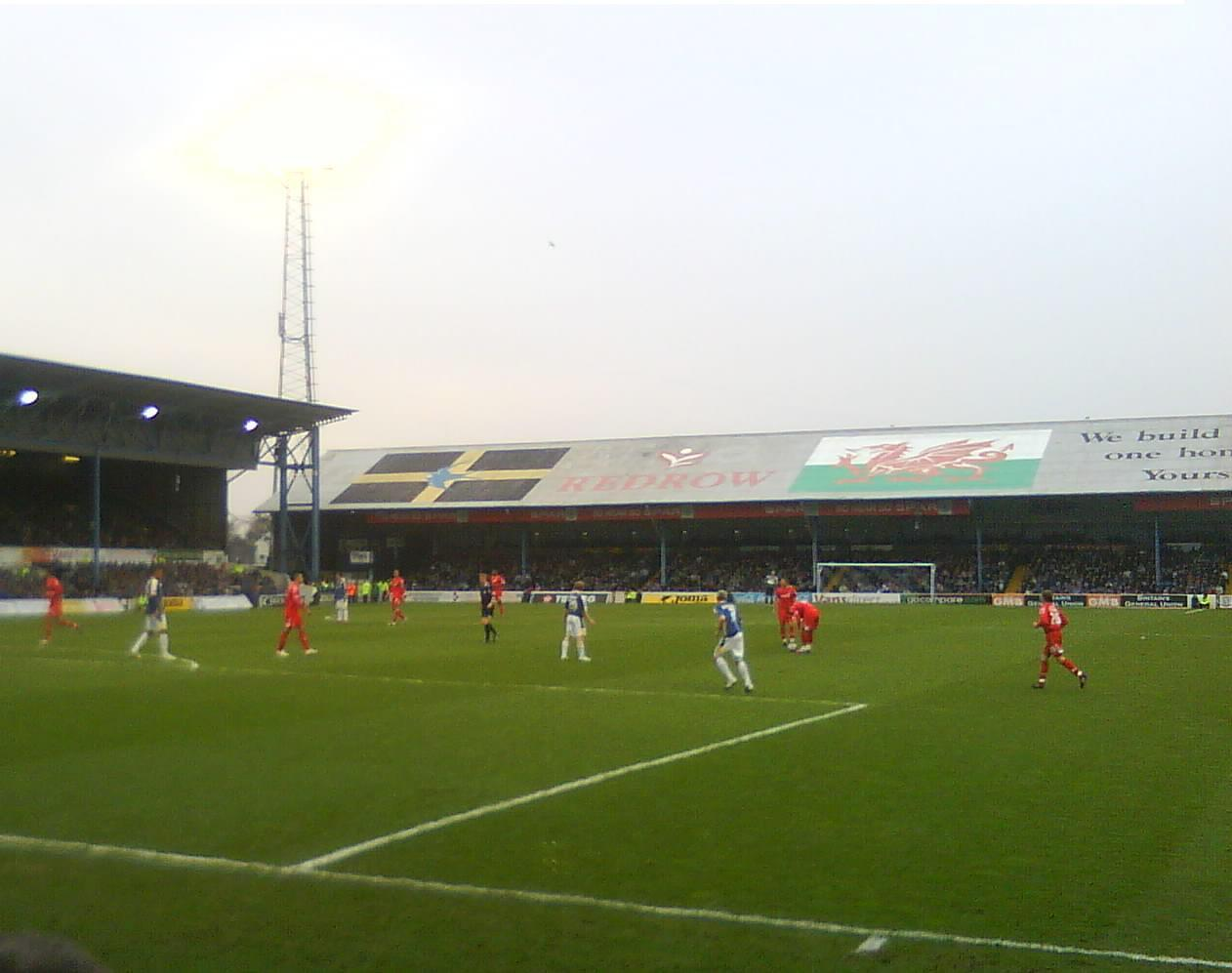

FB	1	Steve Ella
LW	2	Chris Anderson
CE	3	Gene Miles
CE	4	Wally Lewis (c)
RW	5	John Ribot
FE	6	Mark Murray
HB	7	Steve Mortimer
PR	8	Rod Morris
HK	9	Ray Brown
PR	10	Don McKinnon
SR	11	Paul McCabe
SR	12	Rod Reddy
LK	13	Ian Schubert
Substitutions:
IC	14	Kerry Boustead
IC	15	Greg Conescu
Coach:
(Australia) Frank Stanton

Playing fullback, Steve Ella pressed for test selection by scoring 4 tries in the game. Only two players from the team, second row forward Rod Reddy and reserve winger Kerry Boustead, were considered certainties for selection in the upcoming 1st Ashes test.

=== The Ashes series ===
Due to sponsorship reasons, the 1982 Ashes was known as the "Dominion Insurance Test series".

==== First Test ====
While Australia's side for the opening Test was built around the new breed of young players such as Eric Grothe, Wayne Pearce, Mal Meninga, Brett Kenny and Peter Sterling mixing with veterans Craig Young, Les Boyd, Ray Price, Rod Reddy, Kerry Boustead, Steve Rogers and captain Max Krilich, Great Britain chose five players aged over 30. The only player over the age of 30 for the Kangaroos first test team was Krilich who had turned 33 only five days prior to the test. Great Britain were captained by veteran Leeds hooker David Ward. Making his debut for the Lions was Hull F.C. teenager Lee Crooks who was also handed the goal kicking duties in preference to George Fairbairn. Wayne Pearce was awarded the Man of the Match award after throwing the last pass for four tries and scoring a try himself.

Saturday, 30 October 1982

Great Britain	4–40	Australia
Tries Goals; Lee Crooks (2/2)		Tries; Mal Meninga; Les Boyd; Eric Grothe; Ray Price; Kerry Boustead; Brett Kenny; Wayne Pearce; Rod Reddy; Goals; Mal Meninga (8/10)

Boothferry Park, Hull
Attendance: 26,771
Referee: Julien Rascagnères (France)
Player of the Match: Wayne Pearce

Great Britain	Australia

FB	1	George Fairbairn
RW	2	Des Drummond
CE	3	Eric Hughes
CE	4	Les Dyl
LW	5	Steve Evans
SO	6	John Woods
SH	7	Steve Nash
PR	8	Jeff Grayshon
HK	9	David Ward (c)
PR	10	Trevor Skerrett
SR	11	Lee Crooks
SR	12	Les Gorley
LF	13	Steve Norton
Substitutions:
IC	14
IC	15	David Heron
IC	16
IC	17
Coach:
(England) Johnny Whiteley

FB	1	Greg Brentnall
LW	2	Eric Grothe
CE	3	Mal Meninga
CE	4	Steve Rogers
RW	5	Kerry Boustead
FE	6	Brett Kenny
HB	7	Peter Sterling
PR	8	Craig Young
HK	9	Max Krilich (c)
PR	10	Les Boyd
SR	11	Wayne Pearce
SR	12	Rod Reddy
LK	13	Ray Price
Substitutions:
IC	14	Steve Ella
IC	15	John Muggleton
IC	16	Wally Lewis
IC	17	Rod Morris
Coach:
(Australia) Frank Stanton

Great Britain did well in the first half to trail by only 10–4 at half time, but the two penalty goals by debutante second rower Lee Crooks was as good as it got for the home side. In the second half the Kangaroos unleashed their skills and fitness, and blazed six tries to leave the British game, and most of the 26,771 strong crowd packed into Hull's Boothferry Park stunned. The game was Australia's 5th straight win over Great Britain, dating back to the final Test of the 1978 Kangaroo Tour and including the 3–0 whitewash of the Lions on their lacklustre 1979 Australasian tour.

In his test debut for Australia, back row forward Wayne Pearce was judged as the Man of the Match thanks to his defensive work and having a hand in a number of tries as well as backing up a break by Max Krilich and Craig Young to race away and score a 45-metre try with only French referee Julien Rascagneres anywhere near him. Centre Mal Meninga, playing his 4th test and the first of what would eventually be a record 17 Ashes tests against Great Britain, scored the opening try of the game after good lead up work by Peter Sterling and Pearce, then easily palming off Les Dyl and outpacing fullback George Fairbairn to score in the corner. Meninga also kicked 8 of 10 goals for a personal haul of 19 points. His 8 goals also broke the record number of goals for an Australian in a test in England, the old record of 7 had been set by Graeme Langlands in the second test of the 1963–64 Kangaroo tour (the famous "Swinton Massacre" test). It also equaled the most goals for an Australian in an Ashes test, the record was previously the sole property of Noel Pidding who kicked 8 in the first test of the 1954 series at the Sydney Cricket Ground.

In commentary for the BBC, former Great Britain and England dual-rugby international forward Ray French stated after the final siren "Well, I've got to eat a little humble pie. I thought Great Britain could do something, but with only those two penalty goals from Lee Crooks its back to the drawing board for the Great Britain selectors I'm afraid", while his commentary partner, Wigan coach, former Lions halfback and Kangaroos tormentor Alex Murphy said during the first half "We need something to combat this lot."

Wednesday, 3 November

Leigh	4–44	Australia
Tries: Goals: John Woods (2)		Tries: Chris Anderson (3), Paul McCabe (3), John Ribot (3), John Muggleton (2), Wally Lewis; Goals: Mal Meninga (3/11); Wally Lewis (1/2)

Hilton Park, Leigh
Attendance: 7,680
Referee: Trevor Court

Leigh	Australia

FB	1	Mick Hogan
RW	2	Des Drummond
CE	3	John Henderson
CE	4	Steve Donlan
LW	5	Graham Worgan
SO	6	John Woods (c)
SH	7	Ken Green
PR	8	Alf Wilkinson
HK	9	Ray Tabern
PR	10	Derek Pyke
SR	11	Eric Chisnall
SR	12	Geoff Clarkson
LF	13	Ian Potter
Substitutions:
IC	14	Steve Tomlinson
IC	15	Edwin Hunter
Coach:
(England) Colin Clarke

FB	1	Steve Ella
RW	2	Chris Anderson
CE	3	Mal Meninga
CE	4	Gene Miles
LW	5	John Ribot
FE	6	Wally Lewis (c)
HB	7	Steve Mortimer
PR	8	Don McKinnon
HK	9	Ray Brown
PR	10	Rod Morris
SR	11	Paul McCabe
SR	12	John Muggleton
LF	13	Ian Schubert
Substitutions:
IC	14
IC	15
Coach:
(Australia) Frank Stanton

Sunday, 7 November

Bradford Northern	6–13	Australia
Tries: Goals: Keith Mumby (3)		Tries: Greg Brentnall, Gene Miles, Paul McCabe; Goals: Steve Rogers (2)

Odsal, Bradford
Attendance: 10,506
Referee: Mick Beaumont
Player of the Match: Jeff Grayshon

Bradford Northern	Australia

FB	1	John Green
RW	2	David Barends
CE	3	Keith Mumby
CE	4	Richard Davies
LW	5	Steve Pullen
SO	6	Bill Kells
SH	7	Alan Redfearn
PR	8	Jeff Grayshon (c)
HK	9	Brian Noble
PR	10	Gary Van Bellen
SR	11	Graham Idle
SR	12	Dick Jasiewicz
LF	13	Alan Rathbone
Substitutions:
IC	14	Dean Carroll
IC	15	Chris Parrott
Coach:
(England) Peter Fox

FB	1	Greg Brentnall
RW	2	Chris Anderson
CE	3	Gene Miles
CE	4	Steve Rogers (c)
LW	5	Eric Grothe
FE	6	Brett Kenny
HB	7	Mark Murray
PR	8	Craig Young
HK	9	Greg Conescu
PR	10	Rohan Hancock
SR	11	John Muggleton
SR	12	Paul McCabe
LF	13	Ray Price
Substitutions:
IC	14	Ray Brown
IC	15
Coach:
(Australia) Frank Stanton

Tuesday, 9 November

Cumbria	2–41	Australia
Tries: Goals: Lyn Hopkins (1)		Tries: Mal Meninga (2), Kerry Boustead, Steve Ella, Don McKinnon, Wayne Pearce, John Ribot, Steve Rogers, Peter Sterling; Goals: Mal Meninga (7)

Brunton Park, Carlisle
Attendance: 5,748
Referee: Stan Wall

Cumbria	Australia

FB	1	Lyn Hopkins
RW	2	Bob Mackie
CE	3	Dean Bell
CE	4	Ralph McConnell
LW	5	Terry Moore
SO	6	Mel Mason
SH	7	David Cairns
PR	8	Steve Herbert
HK	9	Alan McCurrie
PR	10	Malcolm Flynn
SR	11	Bill Pattison
SR	12	Peter Gorley (c)
LF	13	Derek Hadley
Substitutions:
IC	14	David Beck
IC	15	Ian Hartley
Coach:

FB	1	Greg Brentnall
RW	2	Kerry Boustead
CE	3	Mal Meninga
CE	4	Steve Ella
LW	5	John Ribot
FE	6	Wally Lewis
HB	7	Peter Sterling
PR	8	Don McKinnon
HK	9	Max Krilich (c)
PR	10	Rohan Hancock
SR	11	John Muggleton
SR	12	Ian Schubert
LF	13	Wayne Pearce
Substitutions:
IC	14	Steve Rogers
IC	15	Ray Price
Coach:
(Australia) Frank Stanton

This was the first time that future Australian test halves pair Wally Lewis and Peter Sterling played alongside each other as Australia's five-eighth and halfback. Future New Zealand test captain Dean Bell, then playing for Carlisle at whose home ground the match was played, represented Cumbria in the centres.

Sunday, 14 November

Fulham	5–22	Australia
Tries: Hussein M'Barki; Goals: Steve Diamond (1)		Tries: Steve Ella, John Muggleton, Mark Murray, Paul McCabe, Don McKinnon, John Ribot; Goals: Steve Ella (1/4); Wally Lewis (1/4)

Craven Cottage, London
Attendance: 10,432
Referee: Billy Thompson

Fulham	Australia

FB	1	David Eckersley
RW	2	Adrian Cambriani
CE	3	David "Dave" Allen
CE	4	Steve Diamond
LW	5	Hussein M'Barki
SO	6	John Crossley, Jr.
SH	7	Reg Bowden (c)
PR	8	Harry Beverley
HK	9	John Dalgreen
PR	10	Tony Gourley
SR	11	Martin Herdman
SR	12	Peter Souto
LF	13	Joe Doherty
Substitutions:
IC	14	Neil Tuffs
IC	15
Coach:
(England) Reg Bowden

FB	1	Steve Ella
LW	2	Chris Anderson
CE	3	Gene Miles
CE	4	Wally Lewis (c)
RW	5	John Ribot
FE	6	Mark Murray
HB	7	Steve Mortimer
PR	8	Don McKinnon
HK	9	Ray Brown
PR	10	Les Boyd
SR	11	Paul McCabe
SR	12	John Muggleton
LK	13	Ian Schubert
Substitutions:
IC	14	Greg Conescu
IC	15
Coach:
(Australia) Frank Stanton

Tuesday, 16 November

Hull F.C.	7–13	Australia
Tries: David Topliss; Goals: Lee Crooks (2)		Tries: Eric Grothe (2), Kerry Boustead; Goals: Mal Meninga (2)

The Boulevard, Hull
Attendance: 16,049
Referee: John Holdsworth

Hull	Australia

FB	1	Gary Kemble
RW	2	Dane O'Hara
CE	3	Steve Evans
CE	4	James Leuluai
LW	5	Paul Prendiville
SO	6	David Topliss (c)
SH	7	Tony Dean
PR	8	Mick Harrison
HK	9	Keith Bridges
PR	10	Paul Rose
SR	11	Wayne Proctor
SR	12	Lee Crooks
LF	13	Mick Crane
Substitutions:
IC	14	Barry Banks
IC	15	Mick Sutton
Coach:
(England) Arthur Bunting

FB	1	Greg Brentnall
RW	2	Kerry Boustead
CE	3	Mal Meninga
CE	4	Steve Rogers
LW	5	Eric Grothe
FE	6	Brett Kenny
HB	7	Peter Sterling
PR	8	Craig Young
HK	9	Max Krilich (c)
PR	10	Les Boyd
SR	11	Wayne Pearce
SR	12	Rod Reddy
LF	13	Ray Price
Substitutions:
IC	14	Wally Lewis
IC	15
Coach:
(Australia) Frank Stanton

Emulating what cross-town rivals Hull Kingston Rovers had done in the opening game of the tour, Hull led the Kangaroos at half time, this time 7–0. It would not be until Leeds led Australia 10–6 at Headingley during the 1990 Kangaroo tour that an English club side would lead the Kangaroos at half time of a tour match. However, a double to Eric Grothe and another to Kerry Boustead, with Meninga kicking 2 goals, along with Australia keeping Hull scoreless in the second saw the Kangaroos keep their undefeated record alive with a 13–7 win in front of 16,049 fans. This was the largest tour match attendance at The Boulevard since Australia defeated a combined Hull / Hull KR XIII 37–14 during the 1956–57 Kangaroo tour. It was also the Kangaroos 9th win in a row over Hull since 1911–12 and the largest tour match attendance of the 1982 tour.

Australia played the game with the same team that would line up in the second test at Wigan just 4 days later.

==== Second Test ====
Despite ten changes to the Lions' side, with only winger Des Drummond and props Trevor Skerrett and Jeff Grayshon (who also took over the captaincy) retained from the first Test thrashing, plus Leeds loose forward David Heron who was brought into the starting side from the bench after a good personal second half at Boothferry Park in the first test, the second Test was scarcely a contest as the Kangaroos, playing with mostly 12 men after Les Boyd's send-off, won by 27–6. The only changes to the Kangaroos were tour vice-captain Wally Lewis' inclusion on the main bench (after only being on the extended bench in Hull) and, with captain Max Krilich in some doubt with a niggling neck injury, hooker forward and Manly teammate Ray Brown was also selected on the Kangaroos bench.

Prior to the second test, Phil Larder, the Coaching Director of the British Amateur Rugby League Association (BARLA) spent a week in camp with Frank Stanton and the Kangaroos to observe their training and tactics. After Great Britain's first test humiliation, Larder (who at the time was not actually connected to the Great Britain team in any way) had taken it upon himself to contact Stanton and request the opportunity. English football had begun to fall well behind Australia in recent years and Larder's initiative was rewarded by being made the Coaching Director of the Rugby Football League in 1983. He would also become the assistant coach of the Great Britain side in 1983.

Saturday, 20 November 1982

Great Britain	6–27	Australia
Tries Goals; Keith Mumby (3/3)		Tries; Ray Price; Peter Sterling; Eric Grothe; Mal Meninga; Steve Rogers; Goals; Mal Meninga (6/8)

Central Park, Wigan
Attendance: 23,126
Referee: Julien Rascagnères (France)
Player of the Match: Ray Price

Great Britain	Australia

FB	1	Keith Mumby
RW	2	Des Drummond
CE	3	Mike Smith
CE	4	David Stephenson
LW	5	Henderson Gill
SO	6	John Holmes
SH	7	Ken Kelly
PR	8	Jeff Grayshon (c)
HK	9	John Dalgreen
PR	10	Trevor Skerrett
SR	11	Bob Eccles
SR	12	Chris Burton
LF	13	David Heron
Substitutions:
IC	14	John Woods
IC	15	Alan Rathbone
Coach:
(England) Johnny Whiteley

FB	1	Greg Brentnall
LW	2	Eric Grothe
CE	3	Mal Meninga
CE	4	Steve Rogers
RW	5	Kerry Boustead
FE	6	Brett Kenny
HB	7	Peter Sterling
PR	8	Craig Young
HK	9	Max Krilich (c)
PR	10	Les Boyd
SR	11	Wayne Pearce
SR	12	Rod Reddy
LK	13	Ray Price
Substitutions:
IC	14	Wally Lewis
IC	15	Ray Brown
Coach:
(Australia) Frank Stanton

Australia's fiery forward Les Boyd was sent off late in the first half for kicking a tackled player on the ground. The touch judge, only seeing Boyd's kick and not that it was in reaction to tackled Lions hooker John Dalgreen lashing out with a boot at Boyd while he was on the ground, came on with his flag up and French referee Julien Rascagneres, who did not actually see the incident, did not hesitate in sending Boyd off, leaving the Kangaroos to play out the remaining 46 minutes with twelve men.

Eric Grothe suffered a knee injury while scoring a try late in the first half and was replaced at half time by Wally Lewis. The injury would see Grothe miss the third Test, played a week later in Leeds. Lewis came straight in to the five-eighth position while Brett Kenny moved to the centres and Mal Meninga out to the wing. Half-way through the second half Lewis showed the 23,126 crowd at Central Park what the British game was missing when he sent a bullet like 20 metre pass to Meninga to score in the corner. While those long passes would become a feature of Wally's game over the next decade, that particular pass did psychological damage to the already defeated Lions, who were left wondering just how good the Kangaroos really were if a player who could pass like Lewis did could not even make the starting XIII.

Tuesday, 23 November

Widnes	6–19	Australia
Tries: Goals: Mick Burke (3)		Tries: Steve Mortimer (2), Paul McCabe, John Ribot, Steve Rogers; Goals: Mal Meninga (2/6)

Naughton Park, Widnes
Attendance: 9,790
Referee: John McDonald

Widnes	Australia

FB	1	Mick Burke
RW	2	John Basnett
CE	3	Joe Lydon
CE	4	Keiron O'Loughlin
LW	5	Chris Camilleri
SO	6	Andy Gregory
SH	7	David Hulme
PR	8	Kevin Tamati
HK	9	Keith Elwell
PR	10	Steve O'Neill
SR	11	Keith Newton
SR	12	Eric Prescott
LF	13	Tony Myler (c)
Substitutions:
IC	14	John Myler
IC	15
Coach:
(England) Doug Laughton

FB	1	Steve Ella
RW	2	Chris Anderson
CE	3	Mal Meninga
CE	4	Steve Rogers
LW	5	John Ribot
FE	6	Wally Lewis (c)
HB	7	Steve Mortimer
PR	8	Craig Young
HK	9	Ray Brown
PR	10	Rod Morris
SR	11	Les Boyd
SR	12	Paul McCabe
LF	13	Ian Schubert
Substitutions:
IC	14	Mark Murray
IC	15	John Muggleton
Coach:
(Australia) Frank Stanton

==== Third Test ====
Injuries forced Frank Stanton to make three changes to the Kangaroos for the final Test. Eric Grothe's knee injury in the second Test kept him out with the tour's leading try scorer John Ribot re-claiming his test spot on the wing; Rod Morris replaced Craig Young in the front row; while second test man of the match Ray Price was also ruled out with a knee injury and was replaced by Paul McCabe in the second row allowing Wayne Pearce to move to his favoured position at lock forward.

Sunday, 28 November 1982

Great Britain	8–32	Australia
Tries; Steve Evans Goals; Lee Crooks (2/3); Field Goals; Lee Crooks		Tries; Kerry Boustead; John Ribot; Steve Rogers; Brett Kenny; Max Krilich; Wayne Pearce; Goals; Mal Meninga (7/10)

Headingley, Leeds
Attendance: 17,318
Referee: Julien Rascagnères (France)
Player of the Match: Brett Kenny

Great Britain	Australia

FB	1	George Fairbairn
RW	2	Des Drummond
CE	3	David Stephenson
CE	4	Mike Smith
LW	5	Steve Evans
SO	6	David Topliss (c)
SH	7	Andy Gregory
PR	8	Mike O'Neill
HK	9	Brian Noble
PR	10	Paul Rose
SR	11	Peter Smith
SR	12	Lee Crooks
LF	13	Mick Crane
Substitutions:
IC	14	Neil Courtney
IC	15
Coach:
(England) Johnny Whiteley

FB	1	Greg Brentnall
LW	2	John Ribot
CE	3	Mal Meninga
CE	4	Steve Rogers
RW	5	Kerry Boustead
FE	6	Brett Kenny
HB	7	Peter Sterling
PR	8	Les Boyd
HK	9	Max Krilich (c)
PR	10	Rod Morris
SR	11	Paul McCabe
SR	12	Rod Reddy
LK	13	Wayne Pearce
Substitutions:
IC	14	Wally Lewis
IC	15	Ray Brown
Coach:
(Australia) Frank Stanton

Kangaroos coach Frank Stanton predicted that the third Test would be the best contested of the three, and he was proved correct until the final ten minutes of play. Recalled Widnes halfback Andy Gregory, and Bradford Northern hooker Brian Noble (making his Test debut), led the way for the Lions and provided a service to their speedy outside backs that Britain had lacked in the first two Tests. The Lions made more line breaks in the third Test at Headingley than they had in the previous two Tests combined. The Australian's ran with a very strong breeze in the first half and used this to their advantage, keeping much of the play in Great Britain's half, though they were unable to cross the British try line. Mal Meninga kicked three goals (two from near half-way) while Hull youngster Lee Crooks kicked two long range penalties into the breeze to keep the Lions in the game at 6–4 at half time. Lions winger Des Drummond brought the crowd to its feet mid-way through the half with a 40-metre run from near his own line before he was brought down on half-way by Greg Brentnall and Steve Rogers in cover.

The first try of the game came with just on 50 minutes gone. From deep in his own half, Brentnall made a break down the right wing after breaking a tackle. The play looked like breaking down when he didn't pass to an un-marked Kerry Boustead on his outside and was tackled from behind by a desperate David Stephenson. From there the Kangaroos spread the ball to the opposite wing where Ribot was tackled. Wayne Pearce then broke the British line before passing to Rod Reddy who gave the ball to Ribot flying on his outside. Ribot crashed over in the corner with Lions fullback George Fairbairn clinging to his legs. Pearce then made another break and sent captain Max Krilich on a 30-metre run for his first try of the tour. Krilich scored under the posts giving Meninga an easy conversion and Australia held a 14–4 lead. With just over 10 minutes left to play the Aussies were holding-off Great Britain by 14–8 and an intense finish loomed after Hull F.C. winger Steve Evans had scored the Lions only try of the series (it was also the first try the Australians had conceded in all 11 Tests they'd played since the second Ashes Test of 1979 against the Lions in Brisbane). It seemed Britain had not been so far behind Australia's standard after all, but in the final 10 minutes the Kangaroos superior fitness told and they ripped the home side apart with 4 tries to Boustead, Pearce, Steve Rogers and Man of the Match Brett Kenny to run out win 32–8 winners and become the first touring side to go through Britain undefeated.

Right on half-time there was a set-to between forwards Les Boyd and Mick Crane which resulted in an all-in brawl. Boyd had hit Lions captain David Topliss (their third captain in as many tests) with a shoulder charge on the half-way line and Topliss had lashed out with his feet at Boyd who then punched Topliss as he lay on the ground, with Crane then coming in and began trading punches with the Australian front rower. As the teams lined up for the second half, referee Rascagneres called out both Boyd and Crane and sent both to the sin-bin for 10 minutes.

The Ashes series win was Australia's 4th straight over the Lions dating back to 1974, and their second straight 3–0 Ashes series win. It also continued the streak started by the 1963–64 Kangaroos of successfully defending The Ashes in England. This was also the last test Australia played at Headingley until 2022 when they defeated Fiji 42–8 there during the 2021 World Cup (played in 2022 due to the COVID-19 pandemic). Starting with the 1986 Kangaroo tour, all test matches Australia has played in Leeds have been played at the Elland Road stadium, home of the Leeds United soccer club, due to its greater spectator capacity (Elland Road currently holds 37,890 while Headingley has a capacity of 21,062).

== France ==
Wednesday, 1 December

Racing Club Roanne XIII	0–65	Australia

Stade Malleval, Roanne
Attendance: 2,000

=== First Test ===
The tourists found the French Tests more of a challenge than the British, but in the end the Kangaroos prevailed and finished their tour unbeaten.

Sunday, 5 December 1982

France	4–15	Australia
Tries Goals; André Perez (2/2)		Tries; Eric Grothe (2); Wayne Pearce; Goals; Mal Meninga (3/5)

Parc des Sports, Avignon
Attendance: 8,000
Referee: Robin Whitfield (England)

France	Australia

FB	1	André Perez
RW	2	Patrick Solal
CE	3	Guy Delaunay
CE	4	Jacques Guigue
LW	5	Philippe Fourcade
SO	6	Hervé Guiraud
SH	7	Ivan Grésèque
PR	8	Henri Daniel
HK	9	Christian Macalli
PR	10	Max Chantal
SR	11	Guy Laforgue
SR	12	Marc Ambert
LF	13	Joël Roosebrouck (c)
Substitutions:
IC	14	Christian Laumond
IC	15	Manuel Caravaca
Coach:
(France) Michel Maïque

FB	1	Greg Brentnall
RW	2	Kerry Boustead
CE	3	Steve Rogers
CE	4	Brett Kenny
LW	5	Mal Meninga
FE	6	Wally Lewis
HB	7	Peter Sterling
PR	8	Craig Young
HK	9	Max Krilich (c)
PR	10	Rod Morris
SR	11	Paul McCabe
SR	12	Les Boyd
LK	13	Wayne Pearce
Substitutions:
IC	14	Eric Grothe
IC	15	Ray Brown
Coach:
(Australia) Frank Stanton

During the first half, Wally Lewis dislocated his shoulder while attempting to tackle a French player which ended his tour, though as there were only 2 weeks remaining he remained with the squad until they returned to Australia (the injury was a recurrence of a similar injury he had suffered while touring Japan, Great Britain and France with the Australian Schoolboys rugby union team in 1977). He was replaced by Eric Grothe who went to the wing, Mal Meninga moved to his preferred centre with Brett Kenny moving to 5/8. Within 12 minutes of being on the field, Grothe had scored two tries.

Tuesday, 7 December

Aquitaine	2–67	Australia

Stade de la Myre Mory, Villeneuve
Attendance: 3,579
Referee: H. Martinez

Thursday, 9 December

Les Espoirs (Colts)	3–42	Australia

Stade des Minimes, Toulouse
Attendance: 2,000

Sunday, 12 December

XIII Catalan	2–53	Australia

Stade Gilbert Brutus, Perpignan
Attendance: 4,676
Referee: J. Rascagneres

Tuesday, 14 December

Midi-Pyrénées XIII	0–26	Australia

Stade Municipal, Pamiers
Attendance: 1,000

=== Second Test ===
Saturday, 18 December 1982

France	9–23	Australia
Tries; Ivan Grésèque Goals; Étienne Kaminski (3/3)		Tries; Eric Grothe (2); Brett Kenny; Rod Reddy; Mal Meninga; Goals; Mal Meninga (4/5)

Stade de l'Egassiarial, Narbonne
Attendance: 7,000
Referee: Robin Whitfield (England)

France	Australia

FB	1	Jacques Guigue
RW	2	Patrick Solal
CE	3	Guy Delaunay
CE	4	Christian Laumond
LW	5	Étienne Kaminski
SO	6	Hervé Guiraud
SH	7	Ivan Grésèque
PR	8	Charles Zalduendo
HK	9	Christian Macalli
PR	10	Max Chantal
SR	11	Jean-Jacques Cologni
SR	12	Guy Laforgue
LF	13	Joël Roosebrouck (c)
Substitutions:
IC	14	Michel Laville
IC	15	Manuel Caravaca
Coach:
(France) Michel Maïque

FB	1	Greg Brentnall
RW	2	Kerry Boustead
CE	3	Mal Meninga
CE	4	Steve Rogers
LW	5	Eric Grothe
FE	6	Brett Kenny
HB	7	Peter Sterling
PR	8	Craig Young
HK	9	Max Krilich (c)
PR	10	Les Boyd
SR	11	Rod Reddy
SR	12	Paul McCabe
LK	13	Wayne Pearce
Substitutions:
IC	14	Steve Ella
IC	15	Ray Brown
Coach:
(Australia) Frank Stanton

== Statistics ==
Largest Attendance

- 26,771 – First test vs Great Britain at Boothferry Park

Largest Club Game Attendance

- 16,049 – Australia vs Hull F.C. at The Boulevard

Leading Point Scorer

- 169 by Mal Meninga (11 tries, 68 goals)

Leading Try Scorer

- 25 by Eric Grothe

The tally of 25 tries by Eric Grothe includes 4 tries scored in the match against Western Australia.
The leading try scorer in Great Britain and France was Steve Ella, with 22. Ella also scored one try against Papua New Guinea.

Location	Point Scorer			Leading Try Scorers		
Location	Mal Meninga			Steve Ella	Eric Grothe	John Ribot
Location	Tries	Goals	Points	Tries	Tries	Tries
Papua New Guinea	1	4	11	dnp	dnp	4
Western Australia	dnp			1	4	dnp
Great Britain	7	50	121	9	7	9
France	3	14	37	13	14	10
Total	11	68	169	23	25	23

== Aftermath ==
Following the most successful Kangaroo Tour in history, a number of Australians were targeted by English clubs. Over the next 3 years players such as Peter Sterling (Hull F.C.), Brett Kenny and Steve Ella (Wigan), Eric Grothe (Leeds), Wally Lewis (Wakefield Trinity) and Mal Meninga (St Helens) would have short, but successful stints in England.

== See also ==
- Heads, Ian and Lester, Gary (1988) 200 Years of Australian Sport, Lester Townsend, Sydney
- Whiticker, Alan (2004) Captaining the Kangaroos, New Holland, Sydney
- Andrews, Malcolm (2006) The ABC of Rugby League Australian Broadcasting Corporation, Sydney
- Australian cricket team in England in 1948
