= Kerry Boustead =

Australia international rugby league footballer

Personal information
- Born: 12 August 1959 (age 66) Innisfail, Queensland, Australia

Playing information
- Position: Wing, Centre
Club
Years	Team	Pld	T	G	FG	P
1977–78	Souths (Innisfail)
1979–82	Eastern Suburbs	80	32	0	0	96
1983–86	Manly-Warringah	65	30	0	0	120
1985–87	Hull Kingston Rovers	15	6	0	0	24
1988–90	North Sydney Bears	33	8	0	0	32
	Total	193	76	0	0	272
Representative
Years	Team	Pld	T	G	FG	P
1978–84	Queensland	9	8	0	0	28
1978–84	Australia	25	15	0	0	46
1979–81	New South Wales	6	3	0	0	9

Kerry Boustead (born 12 August 1959) is an Australian former rugby league footballer who played in the late 1970s, 1980s, & early 1990s. A talented representative wing for Queensland and Australia, at the time he was picked for the national team he was the youngest ever player so selected. A prolific try-scorer, he has been named amongst the nation's finest footballers of the 20th century.

== Background ==
An Innisfail junior and younger brother of 1976 Queensland representative Ian Boustead, Boustead was a Queensland Schoolboy representative.

== Playing career ==
=== Late 1970s ===
Boustead made his first grade début with Innisfail Souths in 1977. He first represented for Queensland aged 18 in 1978 while playing for Innisfail Souths. Small in stature, Boustead outshone his giant New South Wales outside back rivals, Terry Fahey and Mark Harris, and that year he made his international representative début at 18 years and 310 days in 1978 in a Test against New Zealand thus becoming the youngest ever player to represent Australia. He played in all three Tests of that series. Boustead then went on the 1978 Kangaroo tour.

All up he made twenty-five Test appearances for Australia and played in eighteen minor matches on two Kangaroo tours, including playing in all six tests on the undefeated 1982 Kangaroo tour. That squad, coached by Frank Stanton and included veterans such as team captain Max Krilich, Craig Young, Rod Reddy, Ray Price, and a crop of new stars such as vice-captain Wally Lewis, Mal Meninga, Wayne Pearce, Brett Kenny, Peter Sterling and Eric Grothe, became known as The Invincibles.

In 1979 the Queensland Rugby League tried to block Boustead's move to Sydney, although Eastern Suburbs ultimately gained his services. He broke his ankle in his first season in Sydney. After having played for New South Wales in 1979 under residential selection criteria, Boustead represented Queensland in the first ever State of Origin match in 1980. He scored Queensland's first ever try in State of Origin and is one of a handful of players to have scored 3 tries in an Origin game.

Ironically, Boustead was initially against the State of Origin concept, believing that players should represent the state where they currently lived and played.

=== 1980s & early 1990s ===
Boustead played in the centres in Easts' loss to Canterbury in the 1980 Grand Final. He toured with Frank Stanton's 1982 'Invincibles', playing all six tests on tour against Papua New Guinea, Great Britain and France. Boustead stayed with the Roosters till the end of 1982 and then in 1983 followed his club coach Bob Fulton to Manly-Warringah for four seasons.

In the Australian off-seasons he played in the UK for Hull Kingston Rovers in 1985–86 and 1986–87, including playing in the centres for Hull KR in their 46–10 loss to the 1986 Kangaroos. However leg, collarbone and shoulder injuries seriously disrupted the momentum of his career in this period. In 1986 while still at Manly he played in only seven matches of the 25 round regular season. In 1988 Boustead resumed his career with the North Sydney Bears making thirty-three appearances in his last three seasons, including playing in the Bears 1989 Reserve Grade premiership winning team, before retiring at the end of 1990.

== Post-playing career ==
In the late 1980s after a survey was conducted to gauge public support for the introduction of a North Queensland team in the New South Wales Rugby League premiership returned an overwhelming positive response, a major step was taken with the appointment of a promotions manager for the bid. Boustead was appointed to this task in 1990. He was also coaching rugby league in the Winfield State League at this time and North Queensland became the first regional side to win the competition in 1991 under Boustead. Boustead was instrumental in the Cowboys being awarded an ARL licence in 1995.

In 2000 he was awarded the Australian Sports Medal for his contribution to Australia's international standing in the sport of rugby league.

Boustead returned to the game as the Chief Executive of the newly promoted North Queensland Cowboys in 1995 but resigned after five competition matches when the club aligned itself with Super League. He served on the NRL Judiciary Tribunal from 1997 to 1998 and in 2000.

In February 2008, Boustead was named in the list of the Australian rugby league's 100 greatest players (1908–2007) which was commissioned by the National Rugby League and Australian Rugby League to celebrate the code's centenary year in Australia. Surprisingly Boustead's position was usurped in the Queensland Team of the Century announced on the night of game II of the 2008 State of Origin by two wingers who were not named in the Australian 100 Greatest – Cec Aynsley and Denis Flannery.

In 2009 Boustead was inducted into the Queensland Sport Hall of Fame. In 2015 Boustead was chosen to be the Cowboys CEO for the 2015 NRL Season

== Sources ==
- Andrews, Malcolm (2006) The ABC of Rugby League Austn Broadcasting Corpn, Sydney
- Big League's 25 Years of Origin Collectors' Edition, News Magazines, Surry Hills, Sydney
- Whiticker, Alan & Hudson, Glen (2006) The Encyclopedia of Rugby League Players, Gavin Allen Publishing, Sydney
