= Frank Stanton (rugby league) =

Australia international rugby league footballer & coach

Personal information
- Born: 7 February 1940 (age 86) St Leonards, New South Wales, Australia

Playing information
- Position: Halfback, Centre
Club
Years	Team	Pld	T	G	FG	P
1961–69	Manly-Warringah	129	21	0	3	69
Representative
Years	Team	Pld	T	G	FG	P
1963	New South Wales	2	0	2	0	4
1963	Australia

Coaching information
Club
Years	Team	Gms	W	D	L	W%
1975–79	Manly-Warringah	123	77	3	43	63
1980	Redcliffe	21	11	1	9	52
1981–86	Balmain Tigers	153	79	2	72	52
1987–89	North Sydney Bears	68	25	3	40	37
	Total	365	192	9	164	53
Representative
Years	Team	Gms	W	D	L	W%
1978–84	City Firsts	4	4	0	0	100
1978–84	New South Wales	11	7	0	4	64
1978–84	Australia	26	23	0	3	88
- Source: As of 10 January 2016

Frank Stanton (born 7 February 1940 in St Leonards, New South Wales), also known by the nickname of "Biscuits", is an Australian former professional rugby league footballer who played in the 1960s, and was a successful club and national representative coach in the 1970s and 1980s. He was educated at North Sydney Boys High School. Both his playing and his club coaching careers were with the Manly Warringah Sea Eagles, although he later also went on to coach the Balmain Tigers and North Sydney Bears. He enjoyed success as coach of the Australian national side from 1978 to 1984, being at the helm in the period when the Kangaroos began to consistently dominate the other rugby league playing nations. Since the death of Norm Provan on 13 October 2021, Stanton is both the oldest and earliest winning of all the living premiership winning coaches.

== Player ==
A local Manly junior graded from the Belrose Eagles club, Stanton was a versatile back who played 129 first grade games for Manly between 1961 and 1969. He started out as a talented halfback and later played at centre in Manly's 1968 Grand Final loss to South Sydney.

He made two state appearances for New South Wales and was honoured with national selection for the 1963 Kangaroo tour. He appeared in 18 minor matches on this tour, but did not play in any of the Tests, with the Australian selectors at the time having a wealth of three-quarter talent available in Graeme Langlands, Reg Gasnier, Peter Dimond, Michael Cleary, Ken Irvine and Les Johns.

== Coach ==
After retiring as a player at the end of the 1969 season, Stanton became the Sea Eagles' reserve grade coach in 1971, leading the team to the reserve grade Grand Final in 1972 before going one better by winning the reserve grade premiership in 1973 (Manly won their first two First Grade Premierships in 1972 and 1973). In 1975, he took over as coach of Manly-Warringah from Ron Willey and was in charge of the side for five seasons until the end of 1979, guiding Manly to premiership success in 1976 and 1978. The 1976 win was a triumph for the astute and powerful Manly triumvirate of captain Bob Fulton, coach Stanton and club secretary Ken Arthurson, who would all go onto higher honours in the game over the next two decades. Stanton spent 1980 coaching Redcliffe in the Brisbane Rugby League premiership, leading the Dolphins to a fifth-place finish.

After his season with Redcliffe in 1980, Stanton then shifted to Balmain to coach the Tigers from 1981 until 1986, during which they won the mid-week Panasonic Cup in 1985. From 1987 to 1989, he coached North Sydney and in 1978, 1979, 1982, and 1984 he coached both the NSW State of Origin and the City teams.

Stanton was appointed coach of New South Wales in 1978 when selection of players for interstate games was still determined by the traditional "state of residence" rules. In 1982, Stanton replaced Ted Glossop as the Blues' State of Origin coach, being the first NSW coach to contest a three-game Origin series. Queensland won the series 2–1 and Glossop returned to coach the Blues in 1983. Stanton again coached New South Wales in the 1984 Origin series, suffering another 2–1 loss to the Maroons.

Stanton was appointed Australia's Test coach in 1978 and over the next six years was rewarded with whitewash wins over New Zealand (1978, 1980 and 1982), Great Britain (1979, 1982 and 1984), and France (1981 and 1982). His 1982 side also won Australia's first-ever Test played against Papua New Guinea played in Port Moresby en route to Britain and France for the Kangaroo tour.

The 1978 Kangaroo tourists, after a successful 2–1 Ashes campaign in England, wound up the French section of the tour in embarrassment, unexpectedly losing both Tests in France. Whilst the refereeing in the first Test came in for criticism, Stanton acknowledged no excuses for the Australians' defeat in the second Test. The 1982 Kangaroo touring side later avenged the French humiliation of 1978, becoming Australia's most successful ever national side by going through the 23-match tour of Papua New Guinea, Great Britain and France unbeaten and becoming known as The Invincibles.

Stanton stepped down as national coach in 1983 and was succeeded by Queensland Origin coach Arthur Beetson. Beetson only lasted for the 1983 series against New Zealand, and was replaced after Australia had won the first Test at Auckland's Carlaw Park, but lost the second Test at Lang Park in Brisbane. For the 1984 Ashes series against Great Britain, Stanton returned for his final stint as Australian coach. The Aussies won the series 3–0 and Stanton retired from representative coaching. During his time as national coach, Stanton oversaw the start of the stellar international careers of players such as Wally Lewis, Wayne Pearce, Mal Meninga, Peter Sterling, Brett Kenny, Kerry Boustead, Gene Miles and Eric Grothe.

== Administrator ==
Stanton was the chief executive of the Manly club from the late 1980s through to the mid-1990s. He was also the interim chief executive of the Melbourne Storm for a period from 2004 to 2006, and was a board director of the Storm as well.

In 2010, Stanton was temporarily re-appointed as Storm caretaker-CEO following the sacking of Matt Hanson in the wake of the Storm's salary cap scandal. He remained in this role for three months until Ron Gauci took over.

== Sources ==
- Andrews, Malcolm (2006) The ABC of Rugby League Austn Broadcasting Corpn, Sydney

Sporting positions
Preceded by Ron Willey; 1970–1974	Coach Manly-Warringah; 1975–1979	Succeeded by Allan Thomson; 1980
Preceded by Graeme Langlands; 1973-1977	Coach New South Wales; 1978–1979	Succeeded by Ted Glossop; 1980-1981
Preceded by Terry Fearnley; 1977	Coach Australia; 1978–1982	Succeeded by Arthur Beetson; 1983
Preceded by Dennis Tutty; 1980	Coach Balmain Tigers; 1981–1986	Succeeded by Bill Anderson; 1987
Preceded by Ted Glossop; 1980-1981	Coach New South Wales State of Origin; 1982	Succeeded by Ted Glossop; 1983
Preceded by Ted Glossop; 1983	Coach New South Wales State of Origin; 1984	Succeeded by Terry Fearnley; 1985
Preceded by Arthur Beetson; 1983	Coach Australia; 1984	Succeeded by Terry Fearnley; 1985
Preceded by Brian Norton; 1985–1986	Coach North Sydney; 1987–1989	Succeeded by Steve Martin; 1990–1992
