= Gene Miles =

Australia international rugby league footballer

Gene Miles OAM
Personal information
- Born: 21 July 1959 (age 67) Townsville, Queensland, Australia

Playing information
- Height: 193 cm (6 ft 4 in)
- Weight: 102 kg (16 st 1 lb)
- Position: Centre, Second-row
Club
Years	Team	Pld	T	G	FG	P
1980–87	Wynnum-Manly	92	42	0	2	159
1988–91	Brisbane Broncos	72	20	0	0	80
1991–92	Wigan	29	8	0	0	32
	Total	193	70	0	2	271
Representative
Years	Team	Pld	T	G	FG	P
1981–89	Queensland	23	4	6	0	35
1982–88	Australia	14	8	0	0	32

Gene Miles (born 21 July 1959) is an Australian former rugby league footballer who played in the 1980s and 1990s. An Australian international and Queensland State of Origin representative centre, he played his club football in the Brisbane Rugby League premiership before joining the Brisbane Broncos in 1988 and later captained in 1990.

== BRL ==
A product of the North Queensland city of Townsville, where he played for Souths, Miles joined Wynnum-Manly in the Brisbane Rugby League premiership in 1980 and was playing in the State of Origin the following year.

He played for Wynnum-Manly in the Brisbane Rugby League premiership's grand final in 1982. He was then one of seven Queensland-based players to go on the 1982 Kangaroo tour (with a squad later dubbed "The invincibles") to Great Britain – the others were Wally Lewis, Rohan Hancock, Mark Murray, Rod Morris, Mal Meninga and Greg Conescu. Miles could not break into the Test team and played against club sides and in an international against Wales. He made his Test début the following year. In 1984 Miles played a major role in an Oceania team's 54–4 victory over an Anglo-French selection in an exhibition match Paris, returning to Brisbane after the match to continue playing for Wynnum-Manly. He returned to the United Kingdom four years later with the 1986 Kangaroo Tour and participated in all six Test matches, against Papua New Guinea, Great Britain and France. After the home Test against New Zealand in 1987, and also winning the BRL's Rothmans Medal that year.

== NSWRL ==
Miles joined the Brisbane Broncos for their maiden season in 1988, playing in their first ever match. He later switched to the forwards and soon adapted to become one of the country's finest second rowers, playing for Australia against the Rest of The World in 1988 at the Sydney Football Stadium.

In 1989 he was part of the Queensland State of Origin team's 3-0 clean sweep of New South Wales, playing all three games in the second-row. He was chosen to tour New Zealand with the Australian squad in 1989 but was forced to pull out with a broken hand. The following year, he announced his retirement from representative football so he could concentrate on his job as captain of the fledgling Brisbane club, helping the Broncos to the play-offs for the first time in 1990.

== England ==
After 72 first grade games for the Broncos, 14 Tests for Australia (including two Kangaroo tours) and 19 State of Origin matches for Queensland, Miles accepted a contract offer from Wigan, making his début in October 1991 against Featherstone Rovers. Miles played 29 matches for Wigan as they won a treble of Championship, Challenge Cup and Premiership. His journey to England, struggle with injuries and adaptation to the English game was chronicled as part of the BBC2 documentary series Up & Under, which followed Wigan and local union side Orrell R.U.F.C. during their 1991-92 campaigns. Whilst at Wigan, Miles formed a formidable partnership with winger Martin Offiah.

== Playing style ==
Initially one of a group of fast and skillful heavyweight Queensland centres along with Mal Meninga and Chris Close, Miles size saw him moved into the Second-row towards the end of his Australian career, though he generally played in the centres with Wigan. Miles was particularly skilled in passing, and noted for his ability to use his 6 ft 4 in (193 cm) height to his advantage and off-load the ball with a one-handed basketball style.

== Post-playing ==
Miles returned to Australia to pursue a media career with Channel Nine and in 2000, was awarded the Australian Sports Medal for his contribution to Australia's international standing in the sport of rugby league. In 2001 Miles was appointed Chairman of Selectors for the Queensland State of Origin. He is also the Executive Director of the non-profit organisation Former Origin Greats (FOGS).

During the 2007 season at the Broncos' 20-year anniversary celebration, the club announced a list of the 20 best players to play for them to date which included Miles.

In February 2008, Miles was named in the list of Australia's 100 Greatest Players (1908–2007) which was commissioned by the NRL and ARL to celebrate the code's centenary year in Australia. In June 2008, he was chosen in the Queensland Rugby League's Team of the Century on interchange bench.

As of 2017, Miles is a selector for Queensland's State of Origin team along with Darren Lockyer and head coach Kevin Walters.

He was awarded the Medal of the Order of Australia in the 2025 King's Birthday Honours for "service to youth, and to rugby league".
