= John Muggleton =

Australia international rugby league footballer

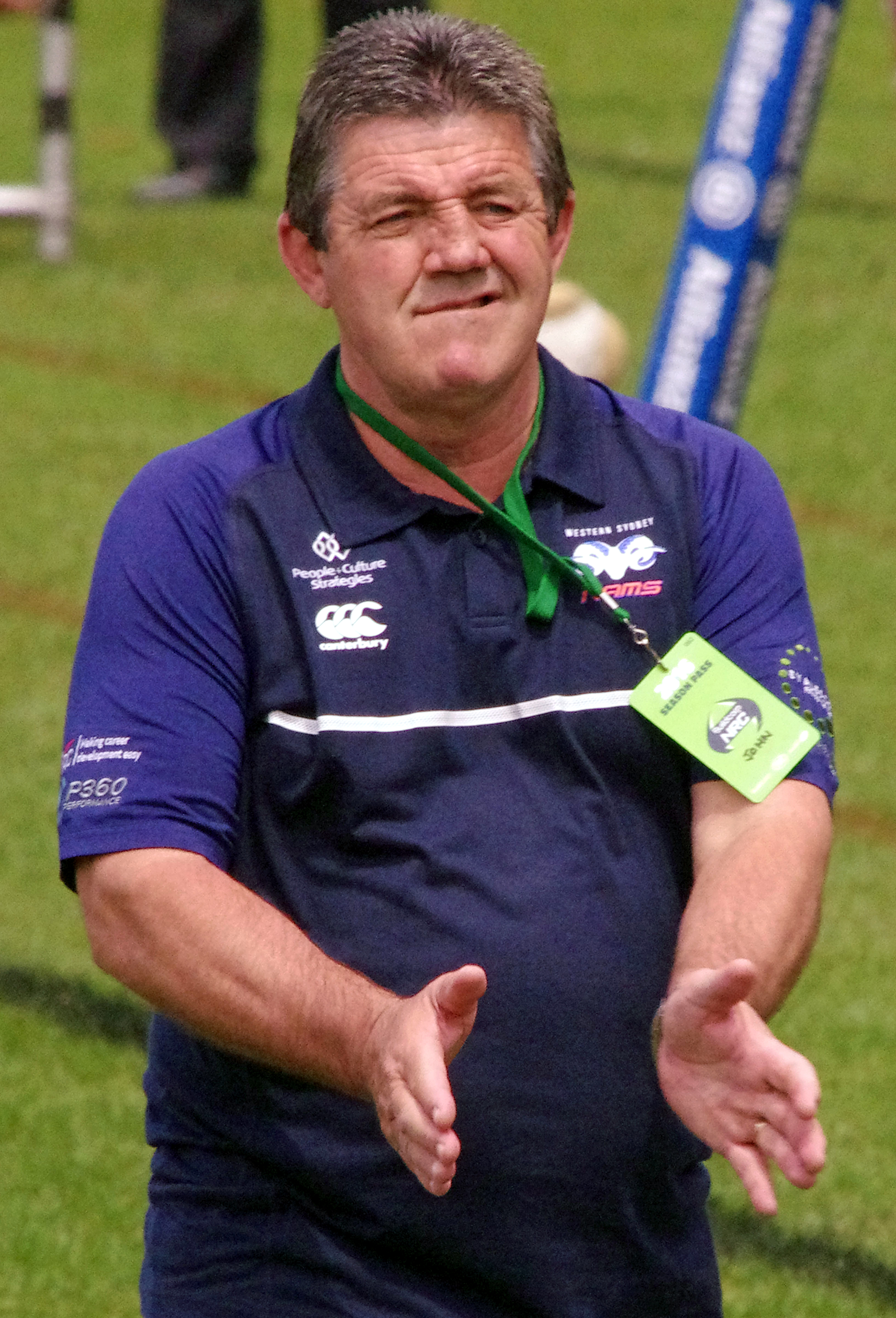

Personal information
- Full name: John Muggleton
- Born: 16 January 1960 (age 66)

Playing information
- Height: 185 cm (6 ft 1 in)
- Weight: 86 kg (13 st 8 lb)
- Position: Second-row, Centre
Club
Years	Team	Pld	T	G	FG	P
1979	Balmain Tigers	6	1	0	0	3
1980–89	Parramatta Eels	114	12	48	2	139
1984(loan)	→Hull FC	24	19	0	1	77
1985(loan)	→Hull FC	12	9	0	0	36
	Total	156	41	48	3	255
Representative
Years	Team	Pld	T	G	FG	P
1982	New South Wales	2	0	0	0	0
1982	Australia	3	1	0	0	3

John Muggleton (born 16 January 1960) is an Australian former rugby league footballer who represented the Parramatta Eels in the New South Wales Rugby League premiership, New South Wales in State of Origin competition and the Australian national team (1982), plus Hull FC in England.

== Playing career ==
Muggleton originally played junior rugby union with Dundas Valley before switching to rugby league at the age of 16 to play for Ryde District Devils, in the Balmain junior competition.

Muggleton was initially graded as a fullback with Balmain, but moved to Parramatta in 1980 and the following year, jumped suddenly into first grade just as the Eels won their first premiership.

In 1982, Muggleton become as a second rower an integral part of Parramatta's most dominant NRL team, providing a second kicker to support Peter Sterling, who was later to become his brother-in-law, and showing abundant ball skills to create opportunities for a famous backline of Sterling, Brett Kenny, Mick Cronin, Steve Ella and Eric Grothe, Sr. Muggleton was chosen for the 1982 Kangaroo Tour, which became known as “The Invincibles” as it steamrolled through England and France to win all 22 games, the first time the Aussies had gone through a Kangaroo Tour undefeated.

However, after that, Muggleton had a great deal of trouble retaining his place during a succession of injuries and much competition from Mark Laurie, Peter Wynn and Steve Sharp in Parramatta's second row.

By 1984, he was used chiefly as a reserve, and in 1984–85 Muggleton had a spell in the UK playing for Hull FC, alongside Sterling, in the then Rugby League First Division. John Muggleton played at second-row in Hull FC's 24—28 defeat by Wigan in the 1985 Challenge Cup Final at Wembley Stadium, London on Saturday 4 May 1985, in front of a crowd of 99,801, in what is regarded as the most marvellous cup final in living memory, which Hull narrowly lost after fighting back from 12—28 down at half-time. In the 1985 NSWRL season, Muggleton after returning from England in May played all but one match for Parramatta in reserve grade. However, with his past experience in the centres, Muggleton was recalled in early 1986 when regular centres Cronin and Ella were injured. Developing as a goalkicker, Muggleton was able to keep his first grade berth and re-establish himself firmly in 1987 with the retirement of long-standing lock Ray Price. A highlight that season was a booming field goal to beat St. George 21 points to 20 with the last kick of the day. However, in 1988 Muggleton was again out of favour and suffered two broken jaws, with the result that in his last two seasons he would start only two first grade matches.

== Coaching career ==
After this, Muggleton turned to coaching, being most successful with North Sydney's struggling President's Cup outfit in 1993 where he lifted them from twelfth to sixth.

Muggleton was the defence coach with the Melbourne Rebels in the Super Rugby competition, serving from 2011 to 2013. Muggleton left the Rebels at the end of the season. His last game as the defence coach of the Rebels was a home game against New Zealand franchise the Highlanders, a match that also turned out to be the last Rebels match for head coach Damien Hill and players James O'Connor, Gareth Delve, Cooper Vuna, Ged Robinson, Nick Phipps and Nic Henderson. In front of over 12,000 spectators, the Rebels overcame a 24-point half-time deficit to achieve a remarkable 38-37 come-from-behind victory over the Highlanders, ending Muggleton's tenure as a Rebels assistant coach on a winning note.

He coached Georgia at the 2011 Rugby World Cup. And, prior to that he was the defensive coach of the Llanelli Scarlets in south-west Wales.

On 25 July 2014, Muggleton became the new Defence Coach for English rugby club Gloucester Rugby who compete in the Aviva Premiership

Muggleton has been the defence coach at the Parramatta Two Blues Rugby Club since November 2015
