= Brian Norton =

Brian Norton may refer to:

- Brian Norton (tennis)
- Brian Norton (engineer)
- Brian Norton (rugby league)
