= Greg Brentnall =

Australia international rugby league footballer

Personal information
- Born: 5 December 1956 (age 69) Wagga Wagga, New South Wales

Playing information
- Position: Fullback, Wing, Centre
Club
Years	Team	Pld	T	G	FG	P
197?–76	Turvey Park
1977–83	Canterbury Bulldogs	108	27	0	2	86
	Total	108	27	0	2	86
Representative
Years	Team	Pld	T	G	FG	P
1975–83	NSW Country	3	1	0	0	4
1980–82	NSW City	3	4	0	0	12
1980–83	New South Wales	4	2	0	0	3
1980–83	Australia	13	4	0	0	12
- Source: As of 14 August 2011

Greg Brentnall (born 5 December 1956 in Wagga Wagga, New South Wales) is an Australian former rugby league footballer who played in the 1970s and 1980s. An Australian international and New South Wales representative fullback and wing, he played for Canterbury-Bankstown in the New South Wales Rugby League premiership, winning the 1980 grand final with them.

== Playing career ==
In the 1960s and 1970s, Brentnall played Australian rules football with the Turvey Park Bulldogs in the Riverina Football League. Representing New South Wales in the Teal Cup, Brentnall caught the eye of talent scouts from the then struggling South Melbourne Football Club in the Victorian Football League (VFL). Instead, he switched to rugby league, playing for Turvey Park in the local Group 9 Country Rugby League competition, before taking up a contract with the Canterbury-Bankstown Bulldogs in the New South Wales Rugby League competition. His ability to catch the high ball made him a valuable fullback for many rugby league representative teams, and he represented Australia.

Brentnall played on the wing for New South Wales in the inaugural 1980 State of Origin game and scored the first try in Origin history. Later that year played in Canterbury-Bankstown's Grand Final-winning side. In 1982, he became Canterbury's first Rothmans Medal winner and also toured with that year's undefeated Kangaroos, "The Invincibles", playing all 6 tests on tour, including Australia's first ever test against Papua New Guinea which was played immediately prior to the tour.

In 2004, Greg was named as a reserve in the Berries to Bulldogs 70 Year Team of Champions. On 1 April 2007, he was inducted into the Bulldogs Ring of Champions.

== Post-playing ==
Brentnall retired from playing after the 1983 NSWRL season at the age of just 26 to take up the position of RL development officer in the Riverina for thirteen years.

Brentnall joined the newly formed Melbourne Storm as assistant coach under former team-mate Chris Anderson. Later appointed football development manager, he continues to work there and the club have honoured him by naming the young achiever (under 18 player) trophy after him. He was also appointed chairman of the Victorian Rugby League.
