= Frank Farrington (rugby league) =

Australian rugby league footballer and administrator

Personal information
- Full name: Francis James Farrington
- Born: 18 November 1926 St Peters, New South Wales
- Died: 9 December 2014 (aged 88)

Playing information
- Position: Forward
Club
Years	Team	Pld	T	G	FG	P
1953–59	Newtown	39	1	0	0	3

Francis James Farrington (18 November 1926 – 9 December 2014) was an Australian rugby league footballer who played in the 1950s and later a long-serving administrator with the Newtown club in Sydney.

== War service ==
Frank Farrington enlisted in the Australian Army shortly after turning 18 in the last year of WWII. He saw service in occupied Japan and was demobilised in 1947. Farrington was also a professional light-heavy weight boxer and fitness fanatic.

== Rugby league career ==
He took up rugby league after returning from active service. He started with the Newtown Jets in the lower grades in 1951 and made first grade in 1953 after having spent 1952 as captain-coach with Cowra in country New South Wales. He then captain-coached at Narrandera, New South Wales in 1954 and Mackay, Queensland in 1955 before returning to Newtown Jets for four more seasons between 1956 and 1959.

== Administrator & manager ==
He began his administrative career with Newtown after retiring as a player, and by the 1970s he was club secretary. He retained that position for over twenty years before retiring. Frank Farrington was also the team manager on the 1982 Kangaroo tour of Great Britain and France. Frank Farrington is remembered as one of Newtown's most loyal servants during the club's history. He was at the helm when the club, long beleaguered by financial problems and lacking a junior development base, was cut from the New South Wales Rugby League in 1983. Farrington preserved and remained the chief executive of the club when it was admitted to Sydney's Metropolitan Cup competition in 1990.

== Death ==
Farrington died in December 2014 aged 88.
