= Ian Schubert =

Australia international rugby league footballer

Personal information
- Born: 22 August 1956 (age 69) Wauchope, New South Wales, Australia

Playing information
- Position: Wing, Fullback, Lock
Club
Years	Team	Pld	T	G	FG	P
1975–80	Eastern Suburbs	122	38	0	0	114
1981	Western Suburbs	19	8	0	0	24
1982	Eastern Suburbs	27	9	3	0	33
1983–84	Manly-Warringah	31	3	0	0	12
1985–89	Western Suburbs	70	5	123	1	267
1986–87	Leigh	21	3	3	0	18
	Total	290	66	129	1	468
Representative
Years	Team	Pld	T	G	FG	P
1975	NSW City	1	0	0	0	0
1978	New South Wales	1	0	0	0	0
1975	Australia	4	7	0	0	21

Ian Schubert (born 22 August 1956) is an Australian former professional rugby league footballer who played in the 1970s and 1980s. He later became chief salary cap auditor for the National Rugby League. An Australian international representative player, Schubert had a long club career which began with a sensational opening season for Eastern Suburbs, before fading out and re-inventing himself with Manly-Warringah and Western Suburbs so well that he regained his Australian jumper after having been in reserve grade a year prior. By the time his career closed Schubert had played 269 first grade games, which stood as the third highest in the history of the NSWRFL.

In 1982, Schubert was a member of the 1982 Kangaroo tour, the team being the first to go through Great Britain and France undefeated, earning themselves the nickname "The Invincibles". Though he did not play any of the tests on the tour, he played in 12 minor games and scored 3 tries.

== Playing career ==
Ian grew up in Comboyne, his talent was discovered whilst playing for the Wauchope high school team. Schubert was selected to play for the Australian Schoolboys team in 1972. He was first recommended to Eastern Suburbs coach Jack Gibson in 1974. Although not out of school at the time, Schubert instantly became a regular first grader on the wing – in the process relegating the previous season's leading try scorer Bill Mullins to reserve grade. When Easts rugby union convert fullback Russell Fairfax was injured, Schubert was shifted to fullback. He scored fourteen tries that year. In the grand final against St George, Schubert was named as 'Man of the Match' for being the best on the ground on the day. Schubert's performance in that match earned him a place in the Australian team for that season's World Cup. In a match against Wales in Swansea he scored a hat-trick. In the tournament he twice scored three tries, whilst in one match against Wales he also briefly moved to lock forward. During the 1976 NSWRFL season, Schubert played at fullback as a wing for Eastern Suburbs in their unofficial 1976 World Club Challenge match against British champions St. Helens in Sydney. The following years saw Schubert fail to maintain the form of his debut season. However, he still retained a spot for the 1978 Kangaroo tour, on which he played ten matches Test place. His return to Australia in 1979, however, saw such a decline that by the time Easts had returned to the top under the coaching of Bob Fulton, Schubert had been relegated to reserve grade and he was not seen in the club's 1980 grand final loss to Canterbury-Bankstown. After leaving Easts, Schubert signed with Western Suburbs for 1981 and played in the club's reserve grade grand final win.

When Schubert returned to Easts after having gained some weight, changed as a player to be a ball-playing forward. Despite injuries preventing him playing in a second grand final, was chosen for his second Kangaroo tour in 1982. He performances on tour saw him not re-signed by Easts and signed with the big-spending Manly club for 1983, playing a significant part in a rather successful season. Schubert was also Player of the Series in the 1983 KB Cup, but the following year he declined to yet again lose his first grade berth.

Ian Schubert returned to Western Suburbs – who in the previous two years were fortunate to remain in the NSWRL competition after losing several players. In the period 1986 to 1988, Schubert's helped Western Suburbs and their young team to move the club off the bottom in the early 1990s. He was their leading point-scorer for the three years from 1986 to 1988 – being the club's regular goal-kicker. In his fifth-last appearance in first grade, Schubert kicked a field goal for the first time in his fourteen-year career. Schubert was later named as a second-rower and as vice-captain in the Western Suburbs Team of the Eighties.

In the 1986 Australian off-season, he travelled to England and made 21 appearances for Leigh RLFC (Heritage No. 958).

== Later years ==
Even before he retired as a player in 1989, Schubert had been coaching Western Suburbs' reserve grade side. He showed his talent as a lower grade coach with Canterbury-Bankstown in the early 1990s but with the Super League split and Chris Anderson's tight grip could never get to coach first grade. In recent years Schubert has been back in the headlines in his new role as auditor for the National Rugby League's salary cap and a number of unsavoury comments concerning breaches of the regulations.

On 22 April 2010, it was brought to his attention that the Melbourne Storm had been cheating the salary cap system for over five years, thus making headlines not only in New South Wales and Queensland but also the rest of the country and even overseas.
