= John Ribot =

Australia international rugby league footballer & administrator

Personal information
- Full name: John Ribot de Bresac
- Born: 3 February 1955 (age 71) Brisbane, Queensland, Australia

Playing information
- Height: 183 cm (6 ft 0 in)
- Weight: 91 kg (14 st 5 lb)
- Position: Wing, Lock
Club
Years	Team	Pld	T	G	FG	P
	Fortitude Valley
1973–76	Wests (Brisbane)
1978–79	Newtown Jets	31	19	7	0	71
1980–81	Wests (Sydney)	36	26	11	0	100
1982–83	Manly-Warringah	52	33	0	0	112
1984–85	Redcliffe	38	13	28	0	108
	Total	157	91	46	0	391
Representative
Years	Team	Pld	T	G	FG	P
1977–85	Queensland	10	3	2	0	14
1978–81	New South Wales	2	2	0	0	6
1981–85	Australia	9	9	2	0	34

John Ribot (/ˈriːboʊ/) (born John Ribot de Bresac on 3 February 1955), also known by the nickname of "Reebs", is an Australian sports administrator and former rugby league footballer of the 1970s and 1980s. A Queensland State of Origin and Australian international representative winger, Ribot was the 1980 NSWRFL season's equal top try-scorer. Also a member of the 1982 "Invincibles" Kangaroo touring squad, he played club football in the Brisbane Rugby League for Fortitude Valley, Wests and Redcliffe, and in the New South Wales Rugby League for Sydney clubs Newtown, Wests and Manly-Warringah.

Following his playing career, Ribot became the foundation CEO of the Brisbane Broncos and later Super League (Australia). When the Australian Rugby League merged with Super League to form the NRL at the end of 1997, he moved south to set up the Melbourne Storm. Well known for his expansionist attitude towards professional football administration in Australia, in 2004 he switched codes, working as a soccer administrator until 2008. He has since taken up a position at the Queensland Rugby League.

== Playing career ==
Ribot played club football in the Brisbane Rugby League premiership for Western Suburbs and Fortitude Valley. He played in Wests' 1976 BRL grand final victory and also gained selection for Queensland as well.

Ribot moved south to play in the New South Wales Rugby Football League premiership for the Newtown Jets (1978 and 1979), the Western Suburbs Magpies (1980, in which he, along with Wayne Wigham of the Balmain Tigers was the League's top try-scorer and 1981, in which he first gained international selection) and the Manly-Warringah Sea Eagles (1982 and 1983). He later returned to the Brisbane Rugby League premiership for the Redcliffe Dolphins (1984 and 1985).

It was while at Western Suburbs in 1980 that Magpies coach Roy Masters moved Ribot from his normal position of Lock forward and utilized his speed on the Wing. Due to his speed, Ribot was often among the fastest players on any team he played. One game where he showcased his pace on the wing was after his move to Manly in 1982. Playing in the mid-season KB Cup competition Final at Leichhardt Oval against Newtown, Ribot took an intercept and raced 65 metres to score leaving Newtown lock Graeme O'Grady trailing in his wake as he touched down under the posts. Manly went on to win the cup final 23–8.

Before the introduction of State of Origin selection rules Ribot represented both Queensland in 1977, then New South Wales in 1978 under the residential criteria. He went on to represent Queensland in 8 State of Origin matches between 1982 and 1985. He is thus one of the rare foundation Origin representatives whose NSW appearances were bookended by selections for Queensland. He was selected for the Brisbane representative team in 1984 and Australia from 1981 until 1985, playing in 9 test matches, including the 1982 Invincibles tour. Also in 1982 Ribot set the record for most tries for Australia in an international with four in Australia's first ever test against Papua New Guinea in Port Moresby.

Ribot was the winner of the Queensland Rugby League Press Writers' Player of the Year Award in 1985. He was later named as a winger in the Western Suburbs Team of the Eighties.

== Rugby league administration ==
- CEO Brisbane Broncos 1988–1995
- CEO Super League (Australia) 1996–1997
- CEO Melbourne Storm 1997–2003

After his retirement from football, he became Queensland Rugby League development manager and the first chief executive officer of the new Brisbane Broncos club when they were introduced to the New South Wales Rugby League Premiership in 1988. While Ribot's talents as an administrator were reflected in the club's success during the 1990s, he was continually at loggerheads with the New South Wales Rugby League (NSWRL) administration, which he saw as leaden-footed and Sydney-centric, so detrimental to the future expansion of the game.

The turning point was the decision by the NSWRL to sack him from its Premiership Policy Committee in 1993 when he proposed shifting the grand final to the Broncos new home ground, the ANZ Stadium which had a spectator capacity of almost 60,000. This compared to the NSWRL's then Grand Final venue, the 42,500 seat Sydney Football Stadium. Ribot argued that having the Grand Final in Brisbane had the potential to attract more fans to the game and bring Grand Final crowds to the same level that had previously been seen at the Sydney Cricket Ground. Although his suggestion wasn't the only reason for his sacking from the committee, the decision to remove him confirmed his view (and a general held belief at the Broncos), that the league was stuck in a "Sydney first" mentality and that the Broncos (who won their second straight NSWRL Premiership in 1993) would never be given a fair go by the league. This was despite many clubs and supporters in Sydney believing that the Broncos had advantages that Sydney clubs could only dream of having, including a monopoly on sponsorship dollars from Brisbane as well as media saturation that included Broncos games being shown on television in Brisbane every week and lead stories in the Qld-based newspapers. Many also pointed out that while the player talent pool in NSW was spread out amongst the 13 NSWRL clubs in the state (plus Canberra), the Broncos had virtually all of Queensland to draw players from (in 1993, the Broncos had 10 Australian test players and another 5 State of Origin representatives in their first grade squad. The next best was Canberra with 8 test players (Australia and New Zealand) and 2 representative players).

An exponent of national and even international expansion of rugby league, Ribot found News Ltd a willing participant in forming an elite, rival competition in the mid-1990s. Resigning from his position as the Broncos' Chief Executive, he became CEO of the organisation known as Super League in the war for rugby league in Australia. Ribot partially realised his 'vision' in getting the competition up and running in 1997 then resigned as Super League chief executive on 24 June to help facilitate a peace deal being reached with the ARL. He secured the franchise to form a club in Melbourne for the re-united competition in 1998. The Melbourne Storm won the 1999 grand final in only the second season of the club's existence. In 2000, Ribot was awarded the Australian Sports Medal for his contribution to Australia's international standing in rugby league.

Ribot's single-minded battle for acceptance in an Aussie rules-dominated city saw the Storm part company with premiership-winning coach Chris Anderson in 2001, and ultimately appoint not only Famous coach Craig Bellamy but Hall of Fame playing quartet Cameron Smith, Billy Slater, Cooper Cronk and Greg Inglis, who would collectively win multiple titles for the Storm over the next two decades.

== Soccer administration ==
In 2004, Ribot extended his sports administration portfolio into football, becoming Chairman of the Queensland Roar FC in the Football Federation Australia's A-League competition. He resigned from this role in March 2008.

== Other boards ==
John Ribot has also served on the board of:

- TAB Queensland

John Ribot is a Director of:

- Victorian Major Events Company 2004–present

John Ribot-de-Bresac is a Director of ASX listed company iSonea
