= Guy Delaunay =

France international rugby league footballer

Personal information
- Born: 24 September 1960 (age 65) France

Playing information
- Position: Centre
Club
Years	Team	Pld	T	G	FG	P
1980–87	XIII Catalan
1987–??	AS Saint-Estève
	Total	0	0	0	0	0
Representative
Years	Team	Pld	T	G	FG	P
1980–91	France	17	0	0	0	0
- Source: As of 18 January 2021

Guy Delaunay (born 20 September 1960) is a French rugby league player who represented France national rugby league team.

== Playing career ==
Starting his career for XIII Catalan, Delaunay marked the 1980s with said club winning several French Championship titles in 1982. 1983, 1984 and 1985 and a Lord Derby Cup in 1980. He later joined the other club of Perpignan, AS Saint Esteve, with which he won a new French Championship title in 1989. Delaunay made his debut for France in 1980 against a touring New Zealand side. He went on to play in 17 test matches for France, including against touring Australian sides in 1982 and 1990, and in matches that were part of the 1985–1988 Rugby League World Cup and 1989–1992 Rugby League World Cups.

== Later years ==
Delaunay later worked for Union Treiziste Catalane and the Pia Donkeys.

== Honours ==
- French Rugby League Championship :
  - Champion in 1982, 1983, 1984, 1985 (XIII Catalan) and 1989 (Saint-Estève).
  - Runner-up in 1981 (XIII Catalan).
- Lord Derby Cup :
  - Champion in 1980 (XIII Catalan).
  - Runner-up in 1983 (XIII Catalan) and 1988 (Saint-Estève).
