= Paul McCabe =

Australia international rugby league footballer

Personal information
- Full name: Paul Dominic McCabe
- Born: 4 August 1959 (age 67) Toowoomba, Queensland, Australia

Playing information
- Height: 190 cm (6 ft 3 in)
- Position: Second-row
Club
Years	Team	Pld	T	G	FG	P
	Norths (Brisbane)
1979	North Sydney Bears	14	0	0	0	0
1980–81	Eastern Suburbs	33	8	0	0	24
1982–85	Manly Sea Eagles	69	14	0	0	47
1986	Balmain Tigers	8	0	0	0	0
	Total	124	22	0	0	71
Representative
Years	Team	Pld	T	G	FG	P
1981	New South Wales	2	0	0	0	0
1981–85	Queensland	5	0	0	0	0
1981–83	Australia	6	2	0	0	6
1981–83	NSW City	2	1	0	0	3

Paul McCabe (born 4 August 1959 in Toowoomba, Queensland) is an Australian former rugby league footballer who played in the 1970s and 1980s. He played for several clubs as well as representing Queensland in State of Origin series. McCabe was also a member of the 1982 "Invincibles" Kangaroos side, playing in the third Test against Great Britain. His older brother John was also a Queensland representative player in the 1970s who played for the Valley's in the BRL.

== Playing career ==
In 1981, McCabe was selected to play for both New South Wales and Queensland. He played the first two games of the series for the Blues and the third game, selected on state of origin rules, for the Maroons. He is one of the few Queensland origin players to have previously played for the Blues.

McCabe played for North Sydney, Eastern Suburbs, Manly-Warringah and Balmain before returning to Queensland. He is one of six players to ever represent NSW and QLD in the same origin series, He also represented Sydney City Firsts and Brisbane, McCabe also played origin in 1983 and 1985, but wasn't able to play in 1984 due to injury.

== Personal life ==
He now is a father of 3, Jacob McCabe (born 1991), Jessica McCabe (born 1992), and Emily McCabe (born 1995).
