= Mark Murray (rugby league) =

Australian RL coach and former Australia international rugby league footballer

Personal information
- Full name: Mark Murray
- Born: 1 May 1959 (age 67) Brisbane, Queensland

Playing information
- Position: Halfback, Five-eighth
Club
Years	Team	Pld	T	G	FG	P
1978–81	Northern Suburbs	70	23	5	0	79
1982	Fortitude Valley	15	6	0	0	18
1983–86	Redcliffe	29	9	0	0	36
	Total	114	38	5	0	133
Representative
Years	Team	Pld	T	G	FG	P
1981–86	Queensland	17	1	0	0	4
1982–85	Australia	6	1	0	0	4

Coaching information
Club
Years	Team	Gms	W	D	L	W%
1988–90	Redcliffe	56	30	0	26	54
1991–94	Eastern Suburbs	80	35	3	42	44
2001–02	Melbourne Storm	43	18	2	23	42
	Total	179	83	5	91	46
Representative
Years	Team	Gms	W	D	L	W%
1999–00	Queensland	6	1	1	4	17
- Source: Rugby League Project

Mark Murray (born 1 May 1959) is an Australian former rugby league footballer and coach. He represented Australia in test matches and Queensland in the State of Origin. His position of choice was halfback. Murray has also coached in the National Rugby League and State of Origin.

== Playing career ==
Murray, a qualified teacher, was an instrumental player in the early Queensland State of Origin sides, and played 17 games (15 State of Origin) between 1981 and 1986. He also represented his country on six occasions between 1982 and 1985 (not including one non-test international against Wales), and toured with the famous 1982 Invincibles, and made his test debut for Australia from the bench in a pre-Kangaroo Tour test against Papua New Guinea in Port Moresby in 1982, though he would not play any of the 5 tests on the Kangaroo tour against Great Britain or France.

Murray also played in the Brisbane Rugby League premiership with the Norths Devils, captaining them to a famous premiership win over Souths in 1980 under the coaching of Kiwi Graham Lowe, before moving to the Valleys Diehards for the 1982 season to play alongside representative teammate Wally Lewis. In 1983 he shifted to the Redcliffe club and played for them up until midway through the 1986 season.

His playing career was cut short that year after he accidentally had a beer glass jammed in his eye. The injury which required surgery, saw him lose all sight in that eye.

== Coaching career ==
After coaching Redcliffe to a Woolies Trophy win and minor premiership in 1990, he was appointed coach of the Eastern Suburbs Roosters in the New South Wales Rugby League premiership between 1991 and 1994, before he was sacked mid-season and replaced by Arthur Beetson. Before his sacking, Murray had already been effectively demoted from the role as Roosters head coach, to be officially designated as "co-coach" with former Roosters player John Peard for much of the 1994 season.

Murray was appointed coach of Queensland in 1999, but was released as coach after the 2000 series, in which the Maroons lost the series 0–3 and were beaten in the last match by 56–16. He and Michael Hagan are the only two coaches in Queensland's history not to have won an Origin series for the state as head coach (although Murray did coach the side in 1999 when the Maroons retained the shield and Hagan was assistant coach when they won the series in 2010). Murray also has the worst winning percentage of any Queensland coach, with only one win and one draw from six matches at 16.6%.

Murray was also the coach of the Brisbane Norths rugby league team from 1997 to 2000, with whom he won the 1998 Queensland Cup. After the resignation of Chris Anderson as coach of the Melbourne Storm in April 2001, Murray took over the role for his second stint as a mentor in the NSWRL/ARL/NRL. He was unable to repeat the success of his predecessor however, and was ultimately released in favour of Craig Bellamy after the 2002 season. He since became the CEO of the Norths club.

== Personal life ==
Outside of rugby league, Murray has previously worked as a teacher, and has also worked in real estate.

Sporting positions
Preceded by Chris Anderson; 1998-2001	Coach Melbourne Storm; 2001-2002	Succeeded by Craig Bellamy; 2003-present
