= Max Krilich =

Australia international rugby league footballer

Personal information
- Born: 25 October 1950 (age 75) Sydney, New South Wales, Australia
- Height: 175 cm (5 ft 9 in)
- Weight: 83 kg (13 st 1 lb)

Playing information
- Position: Hooker
Club
Years	Team	Pld	T	G	FG	P
1970–83	Manly-Warringah	212	31	39	1	173
Representative
Years	Team	Pld	T	G	FG	P
1978–83	New South Wales	8	1	0	0	3
1978–83	Australia	13	1	0	0	3
- Source: As of 31 May 2009

Max Krilich OAM (born 25 October 1950 in Sydney, New South Wales) is an Australian former rugby league footballer who played in the 1970s and 1980s. He was a hooker for the Australia national team, playing in thirteen Tests from 1978 to 1983 and as captain on ten consecutive occasions in 1982 and 1983. He was the captain of the 1982 “Invincibles” Australian touring side. Krilich received the Medal of the Order of Australia (OAM) in the 2018 Queen's Birthday Honours for service to rugby league.

== Club career ==
Krilich played rugby union at school before joining the Harbord United Rugby League Club. He was graded by Manly in 1969. Australian World Cup hooker Freddie Jones was the Manly captain when Krilich joined the club so he had to bide his time.

Nevertheless, Krilich’s potential was recognised so strongly that he played for City Seconds in 1973 whilst still playing reserve grade with the Sea Eagles! Krilich played in over 100 reserve grade games until 1974, and was captain of their reserve grade premiership team in 1972.

When Jones lost form during the 1974 season, Krilich assumed the mantle of top hooker at the club from the eighth round onwards. After the departure of Bob Fulton to Eastern Suburbs following Manly's 1976 premiership win, Krilich assumed the first grade captaincy.

Krilich played 215 first grade games with the club and 119 reserve grade games up till his retirement in 1983.

== Representative career ==
Despite his remarkable feat of being selected for City Seconds whilst still Manly's second-string rake, it would be another four seasons before Krilich was again given representative honours. In the 1978 finals series, Manly played six matches in 24 days to make it through to the Grand Final and the subsequent Grand Final replay where they beat Cronulla. Krilich was selected in the Australian side that toured New Zealand weeks later. He played the first two Tests but season fatigue and injury affected his form and he was replaced by George Peponis for the Third Test. It would be four years later before Krilich would regain a Test spot and grab the Australian captaincy.

In 1982, after captaining New South Wales in the inaugural three-match State of Origin series, Krilich led Australia to victory in two Tests against New Zealand. He was then named as captain of the 1982 Kangaroos, the Frank Stanton-coached side which swept aside all before them becoming the first team to go through Great Britain and France undefeated to become known as "The Invincibles".

Krilich was forced to retire as a player in August 1983 because of a chronic neck injury.

== Coaching ==
Following his retirement from playing, Krilich became the coach of Manly's Under-23 side from 1984 to 1988. From 1989 until 1991 he then became coach of Manly's reserve grade side, though his coaching career came to an abrupt halt when his 1991 side failed to win a game.

During the 1991 pre-season, while first grade coach Graham Lowe was suffering from a hemorrhage in his head, Krilich would serve as caretaker coach of the first grade team. He met with no success in trials or in the pre-season Lotto Challenge, and Lowe would be back for the beginning of the NSWRL competition.

After resigning as reserve grade coach, Krilich retained his position on the leagues club board.

== Personal life ==
Krilich is a Croatian Australian. During the late 1960s and early 1970s, when top grade rugby league players still had regular day jobs, Krilich served an apprenticeship and eventually became a qualified plumber, running his own business known as Max Krilich Plumbing Pty Ltd. During his playing days, Krilich would sometimes employ out of work Manly teammates as offsiders with varying degrees of success. Krilich filed for bankruptcy in 2007 as a consequence of two failed Queensland-based property development businesses.

== Matches played ==
Team	Matches	Years
Manly	334 (Note: 215 first grade; 119 reserve grade)	1970–1983
New South Wales	8	1977–1983
Australia (Tests)	13	1978–1983

== Notes ==
Sporting positions
Preceded by Steve Rogers	Captain Australia; 1982-83	Succeeded by Wally Lewis
