= Patrick Solal =

France international rugby league footballer (b.1961)

Personal information
- Born: 6 March 1961 (age 64) Meknes, Morocco

Playing information
- Position: Wing
Club
Years	Team	Pld	T	G	FG	P
	Tonneins
1983–84	Hull FC	25	8	0	0	31
	Villeneuve-sur-Lot
	Total	25	8	0	0	31
Representative
Years	Team	Pld	T	G	FG	P
1981–84	France	6	3	0	0	9

Patrick Solal (born 6 March 1961) is a former rugby league footballer who played as a wing. He had a brief career in England with Hull FC, and represented France at international level.

== Playing career ==
Born in Meknes, Morocco, Solal began his sporting career in athletics. He competed at the ISF World Gymnasiade in 1978, winning the 110m hurdles.

Solal started his rugby league career with Tonneins. After impressing for France in a match against Great Britain, he was signed by English club Hull in March 1983. He was part of the team that was defeated in the 1982–83 Premiership final. During the following season, he played in Hull's 13–2 win over Castleford in the 1983–84 Yorkshire Cup final. He struggled to settle in England, and returned to France at the end of the 1983–84 season.
