= Brian Norton (rugby league) =

Australian rugby league footballer and coach (1944–2018)

Personal information
- Full name: Brian Edward Norton
- Born: 27 December 1944; North Sydney, New South Wales, Australia
- Died: 22 April 2018 (aged 73); Lane Cove, New South Wales, Australia

Playing information
- Position: Prop
Club
Years	Team	Pld	T	G	FG	P
1968–70	North Sydney	40	3	0	0	9
1971–74	St George	43	5	0	0	15
1975	North Sydney	7	0	0	0	0
	Total	90	8	0	0	24
Representative
Years	Team	Pld	T	G	FG	P
1967	NSW Country	1	0	0	0	0

Coaching information
Club
Years	Team	Gms	W	D	L	W%
1985–86	North Sydney	34	15	1	18	44

Brian Norton (27 December 1944 – 22 April 2018) nicknamed "Chicka" was an Australian rugby league footballer who played in the 1960s and 1970s and coached in the 1980s. He played in the NSWRFL premiership for North Sydney and St George as a prop.

== Early life ==
Norton was born and raised in North Sydney and played his junior rugby league in the area. Norton then moved to Tamworth and was selected to play in the country representative side in 1967.

== Playing career ==
Norton was graded by the club he supported as a child, the North Sydney Bears in 1968. Norton spent three years at Norths but the club struggled on the field finishing near the bottom of the table. In 1971, Norton joined the St George Dragons but did not feature in the club's finals campaign or grand final loss to South Sydney that year. In 1972, Norton featured more prominently for St George and played in both the club's finals matches as they made it to the preliminary final before being defeated by Eastern Suburbs. St George then qualified for the finals the following year with Norton featuring in both games against Newtown which ended in defeat. In 1975, Norton re-joined North Sydney and spent one last season at the club as they finished ninth on the table before retiring as a player.

== Coaching career ==
Norton began his coaching career when he replaced Gregory Hawick as coach of North Sydney midway through the 1985 season. At the time of coming in as coach, North Sydney were in danger of finishing last on the table but he guided North Sydney to safety with an 11th-placed finish. Norton is credited with bringing back a fighting spirit to the Norths club and he instilled a motto for the team to follow which was “The real winners are those who lose but keep fighting".

In his first full season as coach, Norton guided Norths to the finals in 1986. At the time, Norths had only managed to qualify for the finals on two occasions in the last 20 years before this. Norths went on to lose their elimination final against Balmain played at the Sydney Cricket Ground. Despite having a successful season, Norton stood down as coach and was replaced by Frank Stanton for the 1987 season. Even though Norton's tenure at the club was short, his impact on the club changed the culture at Norths and set them on a path over the next decade to go from easy beats to title contenders.

After leaving Norths, Norton went and coached in Darwin before returning to North Sydney and became a board member at the club.

Sporting positions
Preceded by Greg Hawick; 1985	Coach North Sydney; 1985–1986	Succeeded by Frank Stanton; 1987–1989
