= John Dalgreen =

GB international rugby league footballer

Personal information
- Full name: John Dalgreen
- Born: third ¼ 1955 (age 69–70) Dewsbury, England

Playing information
- Position: Hooker
Club
Years	Team	Pld	T	G	FG	P
1974–77	Halifax	54	11	61	0	155
1977–80	Warrington	50	9	0	1	28
1981–84	Fulham	58	9	0	2	29
1984–85	Halifax	10	1	0	0	4
	Total	172	30	61	3	216
Representative
Years	Team	Pld	T	G	FG	P
1978	Yorkshire	1	1	0	0	3
1982	Great Britain	1	0	0	0	0

John Dalgreen (birth registered third ¼ 1955) is an English former professional rugby league footballer who played in the 1970s and 1980s. He played at representative level for Great Britain, and at club level for Halifax (two spells), Warrington and Fulham RLFC, as a hooker.

== Background ==
Dalgreen was born in Dewsbury, West Riding of Yorkshire, England.

== Playing career ==
=== Club career ===
John Dalgreen played hooker in Warrington's 9-4 victory over Widnes in the 1977–78 Players No.6 Trophy Final during the 1977–78 season at Knowsley Road, St. Helens on Saturday 28 January 1978.

In May 1981, he was signed by Fulham RLFC for a fee of £18,000.

=== International honours ===
John Dalgreen won his only cap for Great Britain while at Fulham RLFC in the 1982 Ashes series against Australia. During the first half of the game at Wigan's Central Park, Dalgreen was tackled by fiery Kangaroos forward Les Boyd. While on the ground he lashed out with his boot at Boyd, kicking him in the shins. Boyd retaliated by kicking the Lions hooker and was sent off by the French referee Julian Rascagneres. Dalgreen escaped sanction for the incident as the focus was put on Boyd's send-off.

== Honours ==
- Open Rugby World XIII: February 1979
