= Les Boyd =

Australian international rugby league footballer

Personal information
- Full name: Lesley William Boyd
- Born: 17 November 1956 (age 69) Nyngan, New South Wales, Australia

Playing information
- Position: Second-row, Prop, Lock
Club
| Years | Team | Pld | T | G | FG | P |
|---|---|---|---|---|---|---|
| 1976–79 | Western Suburbs | 68 | 24 | 0 | 0 | 72 |
| 1980–84 | Manly Sea Eagles | 75 | 14 | 0 | 0 | 45 |
| 1985–89 | Warrington | 86 | 20 | 0 | 0 | 80 |
| | Total | 229 | 58 | 0 | 0 | 197 |
Representative
| Years | Team | Pld | T | G | FG | P |
| 1978–82 | Australia | 17 | 4 | 0 | 0 | 12 |
| 1979–83 | New South Wales | 8 | 1 | 0 | 0 | 3 |
| 1983 | NSW Country | 1 | 1 | 0 | 0 | 4 |
| 1979–82 | NSW City | 2 | 0 | 0 | 0 | 0 |
- Source: As of 17 October 2019

Les Boyd (born 17 November 1956) is an Australian former rugby league footballer who played in the 1970s and 1980s. He played representative football for the Australian national side in international matches as well as the New South Wales side in the State of Origin. Boyd played club football in both Australia and England and his usual position was in the second-row.

== Biography ==
Boyd was born in Nyngan, New South Wales on 17 November 1956, and attended Nyngan High School. Whilst there he played for the Australian Schoolboys team in 1972 under his future Western Suburbs coach Roy Masters.

=== Professional playing career ===
From 1976 to 1984 Boyd played in the New South Wales Rugby Football League premiership for the Western Suburbs Magpies, then the Manly-Warringah Sea Eagles. His first season at Western Suburbs saw him play in a first grade team that went relatively unchanged for the next 4 years and establish themselves as a powerhouse of the competition. Boyd was an important part of the 1977 side which claimed the midweek knockout competition then followed that up the next year as minor premiers of 1978. Wests were controversially defeated in the semi final against Manly, who would go on to win the premiership while Boyd would leave Wests to join Manly two years later.

He was selected to go on the 1978 Kangaroo tour and his hard running saw him emerge as one of the star forwards on the tour, culminating with him forcing his way into the test team for the final two Ashes tests against Great Britain. Boyd made his test début for the Kangaroos when selected on the bench for the second Ashes test at Bradford's Odsal Stadium. During the 1979 Great Britain Lions tour Boyd was selected to play for Australia in all 3 of their Ashes test victories, scoring a try in the third. In 1980, he successfully sued Mirror Newspapers Ltd for publishing an article that stated he was 'fat, slow and predictable'. During the 1982 New Zealand rugby league tour of Australia and Papua New Guinea, Boyd was selected to play for the Kangaroos at second-row forward in both Test matches against the Kiwis. Later that year, Boyd made his second Kangaroo Tour when he was part of the undefeated 1982 Kangaroos side who became known as "The Invincibles". Despite normally being a second row forward, he played all three tests against Great Britain in the front row, scoring a try in the first test at Boothferry Park in Hull. The hard running forward was sent off in the first half of the second test at Central Park in Wigan by French referee Julian Rascagneres for kicking Lions Hooker John Dalgreen. In fairness to Rascagneres, he had called a penalty against Boyd for a flop in the tackle and was looking back down field. This caused him to miss Dalgreen (who was on his back on the ground) lashing out at Boyd with his boot, kicking him in the shin as television replays clearly showed (the English-based touch judge also missed Dalgreen's kick, or ignored it, and only reported Boyd's retaliation). BBC commentator Ray French called Boyd's retaliation a "vicious kick", though it appeared he had also missed Dalgreen's action. Boyd's send-off didn't affect the Kangaroos though. Leading 15–4 at the time, they powered on to win the match 27-6 and along with it, retaining the Ashes they had held since the 1978 Kangaroo tour and keeping their record of not having lost a series in England since the 1959–60 Kangaroo tour.

Boyd's volatile nature while on the field (which was in total contrast to his quiet off-field nature) also saw him sent to the sin-bin at the start of the second half of the third and last Ashes series test at Headingley after a fight which had broken out at the end of the first half.

Boyd then reverted to his usual second row for the first test against France in Narbonne before again playing in the front row in the second test, the last match on the tour.

While playing for New South Wales in the opening game of the 1983 State of Origin series at Brisbane's Lang Park, Boyd broke the jaw of Queensland forward Darryl Brohman with his elbow (rumours at the time stated that had Brohman's jaw not been broken, he was in line to make his test début for Australia in the 1983 test series against New Zealand starting three days later. He would never again get that opportunity). Referee Barry Gomersall did not send Boyd off and only gave Queensland a penalty. Boyd was not cited by the NSWRL over the incident and the following day was actually selected in the Australian team for the New Zealand test but was forced to step down when Charlie Gibson, the Secretary of Brohman's club team Penrith, officially cited him. Many, including NSW coach Ted Glossop who appeared at the judiciary on Boyd's behalf, believe he was unfairly dealt with by the judiciary headed by lawyer Jim Comans who suspended the Manly forward for 12 months. At the time Comans was on a campaign to clean up the violence in rugby league and many felt that Boyd had been used as something of a poster boy for the campaign, with the punishment far outweighing the crime.

Brohman later instigated legal action against Boyd over the incident, with the matter being settled out of court. During that same game, Boyd also targeted his Manly-Warringah teammate and Queensland back rower Paul Vautin. Close to half time, Boyd was tackled by Vautin who was penalised for not letting him up to play the ball. Boyd pushed Vautin who responded by throwing a punch which Boyd returned in kind. Things looked likely to escalate until Maroons replacement front rower Dave Brown (another Manly player), stepped in and hit Boyd, effectively calming things down. Ironically Brown (briefly) won the spot in the Australian test team that was widely tipped to be Brohman's.

In 1984 while playing for Manly, Boyd was again suspended, this time for a record-equalling 15 months for eye-gouging of Canterbury hooker Billy Johnstone. The suspension effectively ended Boyd's playing career in Australia.

=== England ===
Boyd played out the rest of his career in England with Warrington. He played second-row (replaced by substitute Kevin Tamati) in Warrington's 8–34 defeat by Wigan in the 1985 Lancashire Cup Final during the 1985–86 season at Knowsley Road, St. Helens, on Sunday 13 October 1985. He was man of the match, winning the Harry Sunderland Trophy, in Warrington's 38–10 victory over Halifax in the Premiership Final during the 1985–86 season at Elland Road, Leeds on Sunday 18 May 1986. Boyd played prop in Warrington's 4–18 defeat by Wigan in the 1986–87 John Player Special Trophy Final during the 1986–87 season at Burnden Park, Bolton on Saturday 10 January 1987.

Boyd played his final game for Warrington in 1989. In 2019, he was inducted into Warrington's Hall of Fame.

== Post-playing ==
In 2000 Boyd was awarded the Australian Sports Medal for his contribution to Australia's international standing in rugby league. Further honours came in September 2004 when he was named at lock in the Western Suburbs Magpies team of the century. Boyd currently works as a rep in the Riverina region of south western New South Wales for Lion Nathan.

=== Hall of Fame ===
In August 2024, the National Rugby League announced that Boyd was an inductee into the National Rugby League Hall of Fame. Boyd, who was ascribed Hall of Fame number 117, was amongst eleven male players in the 2024 Class.
