= Rohan Hancock =

Australia international rugby league footballer

Personal information
- Born: 18 June 1955 (age 69); Toowoomba, Queensland

Playing information
- Position: Prop
Club
Years	Team	Pld	T	G	FG	P
	? (Toowoomba)
Representative
Years	Team	Pld	T	G	FG	P
1978–82	Queensland	11	1	0	0	3
1980–82	Australia	3	0	0	0	0
- Source: As of 9 July 2009
- Relatives: Steph Hancock (daughter)

Rohan Hancock (born 18 June 1955 in Toowoomba, Queensland) is an Australian former rugby league footballer who played in the 1970s and 1980s. An Australian international and Queensland representative prop forward, he played his club football in Queensland with Toowoomba.

== Biography ==
Hancock, a prop from Toowoomba, played for Wattles in the Toowoomba Rugby League competition. He first represented Queensland in 1978, played against Great Britain in 1979 before touring New Zealand with Australia the following year. Hancock played in the inaugural State of Origin match in 1980 but had to wait another two years before making his Test debut.

After playing in two Tests against NZ, Hancock was selected with the Kangaroos and made his only Test appearance against Papua New Guinea (in 1982) on the way to England and France with the 1982 Invincibles. He played in nine other matches on tour.

== Personal life ==
Rohan Hancock's daughter, Steph Hancock, went onto captain the Australian Jillaroos.
