= Ray Brown (rugby league) =

Australia international rugby league footballer

Personal information
- Full name: Raymond Brown
- Born: 12 April 1957 (age 69) Griffith, New South Wales, Australia

Playing information
- Position: Hooker, Second-row, Prop
Club
Years	Team	Pld	T	G	FG	P
197?–7?	Griffith
1979	Western Suburbs	23	5	0	0	15
1980–86	Manly-Warringah	92	4	0	0	14
	Total	115	9	0	0	29
Representative
Years	Team	Pld	T	G	FG	P
1983	New South Wales	3	0	0	0	0
1982–83	Australia	5	0	0	0	0
1978–84	NSW Country	3	0	0	0	0

Ray Brown (born 12 April 1957) is an Australian former professional rugby league footballer who played in the 1970s and 1980s. An Australian international and New South Wales State of Origin representative forward, he played club football in the New South Wales Rugby League premiership for Western Suburbs in 1979 and then spent seven seasons at the Manly-Warringah Sea Eagles between 1980 and 1986.

== Playing career ==
Originally from Griffith, New South Wales, he represented Riverina in 1978, and was awarded the Country Rugby League's Player of the Year. His club at the time was Griffith Waratahs. The following year Brown played one season for Western Suburbs and moved on to Manly-Warringah in 1980.

Brown was also selected to represent New South Wales as hooker for game II of the 1983 State of Origin series and was on the reserve bench for games I and III.

As an Australian Kangaroo, Brown played in five Tests; four in 1982 (Great Britain twice, France and Papua New Guinea) and one in 1983 against New Zealand. He is listed on the Australian Players Register as Kangaroo No. 541.

Brown was named at hooker for the Western Suburbs Team of the Seventies.
