= Eric Grothe Sr. =

Australia international rugby league footballer (born 1960)

Eric Grothe
Personal information
- Full name: Eric Grothe Sr.
- Born: 6 January 1960 (age 66) Sydney, New South Wales, Australia

Playing information
- Position: Wing
Club
Years	Team	Pld	T	G	FG	P
1979–89	Parramatta Eels	152	78	0	0	284
1985–86	Leeds	16	14	0	0	56
	Total	168	92	0	0	340
Representative
Years	Team	Pld	T	G	FG	P
1981–86	New South Wales	9	3	0	0	10
1982–84	Australia	8	10	0	0	34
1983–87	City NSW	5	5	0	0	20
- Relatives: Eric Grothe Jr. (son)

Eric Grothe Sr. (born 6 January 1960), also known by the nickname "Guru", is an Australian former professional rugby league footballer who played in the 1970s and 1980s. A New South Wales and Australian representative wing , he played club football for the Parramatta Eels with whom he won four NSWRL premierships. Since retiring, Grothe has been named amongst the nation's finest footballers of the 20th century

== Background ==
Grothe was born in Sydney, New South Wales, Australia. He is the son of German immigrant parents.

== Career highlights ==
Grothe's size, speed and trademark ability to break a tackle through sheer strength enabled him to perfectly book-end Parramatta's star studded backline of the early 1980s outside Brett Kenny, Mick Cronin, Peter Sterling and Steve Ella. Along with dual union, and league international Ray Price, these stars formed the nucleus of a side which dominated the New South Wales Rugby League premiership between 1981 and 1986, playing in five Grand Finals, winning four (1981, 1982, 1983, 1986), as well as finishing runner up in 1984, and third in 1985.

Known as "the Guru" due to his long locks and beard in his playing years, as well as his hobby of meditation, he all up played 152 first grade career games for Parramatta, scoring 78 tries. Unfortunately, his club and representative career was restricted by recurring knee injuries.

Grothe represented for Australia in eight Tests between 1982 and 1984 and made the 1982 Kangaroo Tour. He had nine State of Origin appearances for New South Wales between 1981 and 1986.

== Year by year ==
=== 1978 Rookie ===
Grothe graduated from Liverpool Boys High School, the same school as another Australian international, Geoff Gerard. He played his junior football for East Mt. Pritchard, alongside Steve Ella. In 1978, Grothe was named as Parramatta's Rookie of the Year at age 18, scoring 16 tries in 17 matches in the Eels Under-23 Presidents Cup team.

=== 1979 1st Grade ===
He débuted in first grade 1979, however after a promising start which included three tries in one game against South Sydney, a succession of injuries meant that he was not able to show his full ability until the 1981 season.

=== 1981 Premiership & Origin ===
Grothe showed his class in Parramatta's first premiership title year in 1981 and launched his representative career in the sole New South Wales v Queensland game played that year under the State of Origin rules. He scored two tries in his début for the Blues at Brisbane's Lang Park, including a 90-metre effort, scooping up a wayward pass by Maroons hooker Greg Conescu, and sprinting down the touchline before breaking a desperation tackle from Mitch Brennan to score crawling into the corner.

Grothe figures in a moment which has since made its way into Origin folklore. Queensland fullback Colin Scott fielded a kick near halfway and split the defence in a 45-metre charge that ended just short of the line thanks to a despairing tackle by Grothe who had made almost 10 metres on him. Grothe clung to Scott's ankles as he waited for his teammates to get back but in a now famous image, Chris Close backhanded Grothe out of the way, picked up the ball from dummy half and placed it over the line for a try.

=== 1982 Kangaroo ===
The Guru was member of Parramatta's victorious premiership side in 1982, but didn't play in any of the 1982 State of Origin series games.

He was selected for Australia on the 1982 Kangaroo tour, the squad whose record earned them the title of "The Invincibles". He made his Test début in the first Ashes Test against Great Britain at Boothferry Park in Hull, where his blockbusting runs saw him saw a try on début in a 40–4 win for the Kangaroos. Grothe was injured in the second test win at Central Park while scoring a try, and missed the final test win at Headingley. He then played in both winning tests against France (the first from the bench), scoring two tries in each game. He also played in 14 minor games on tour, scoring 21 tries (including five tries in the match against Roanne in France). Grothe also kicked one goal on tour in a club game in France.

=== 1983 3rd Premiership ===
In the 1983 Final against Canterbury-Bankstown, Grothe scored a phenomenal first half solo try beating man after man – six in all, to get to the tryline.

He was prominent in the Eels side that won their third successive premiership, figuring in the 18-6 Grand Final victory over Manly-Warringah when in the 13th moment he steamrolled his way over burly Manly fullback Graham Eadie to score.

Grothe played in both Tests of the 1983 series against New Zealand scoring tries in each game.

=== 1984 Ashes ===
In a club match that year against Western Suburbs he equalled a then club record he had set in 1982 of four tries in a game.

He played in the second and third Tests of that year's domestic Ashes series against Great Britain. The third test victory at the Sydney Cricket Ground would prove to be his last Test appearance. He finished his Test career with the phenomenal record of scoring a try in every Test he played.

=== 1985 UK stint ===
In 1985 Grothe had a season with English club Leeds where he scored 14 tries in 16 games, including a hat-trick on début against Leigh on New Year's Day – then only the third player to score three tries on début for the club. In the Australian season he suffered from knee problems that prevented his selection for the mid-season tour of New Zealand, but he was superb in Parramatta's end-of-season surge until they lost 0–26 to Canterbury in the Preliminary Final.

His chronic knee-ligament problems would plague the rest of his career,

=== 1986 4th premiership ===
In 1986 Grothe played in Parramatta's tryless grand final win made his final State of Origin appearance in game III.

However injury restricted him to playing less than half the season, and while he was originally selected for the 1986 Kangaroo touring squad, and indeed he was involved in pre-tour promotional photo sessions with the team, Grothe was controversially ruled out with a knee injury before the team left for the tour and he was replaced by young Penrith Panthers halfback Greg Alexander. The 1986 Kangaroos, coached by Don Furner, and captained by Queensland captain Wally Lewis, emulated the deeds of the 1982 Invincibles by remaining undefeated on tour, earning themselves the nickname of "The Unbeatables". Teammates Peter Sterling and Brett Kenny, were surprisingly the only players selected from the 1986 NSWRL premiers.

=== 1987–1990 ===
After being selected for City Origin during the 1987 season, his knee injury recurred and he did not play at all in the second half of the season. When he returned in 1988 it was clear he had lost considerable pace even before injury also ended that season. 1989 saw Grothe initially used from the reserves bench and then briefly playing in the unfamiliar position of centre. He was selected again that year for City Firsts but injured in a match at Brookvale Oval when he had come on as replacement for the injured Peter Sterling.

After efforts at treating his knee failed, Grothe retired on 13 April 1990.

== Accolades ==
When a best Australian team of the limited tackle era was named in 1995, Grothe shared with prop Arthur Beetson the distinction of being a unanimous choice of every judge.

In 2005 he was named one of the 25 greatest NSW players.

He stands at equal sixth with Ray Price on the Parramatta all-time try tally list with 78 scored in 152 games.

In February 2008, Grothe was named in the list of Australia's 100 Greatest Players (1908–2007) which was commissioned by the NRL and ARL to celebrate the code's centenary year in Australia.

== Origin father and son ==
Grothe's son Eric Jr. began to play for Parramatta in 1999 and represented for New South Wales in 2006. They are thus one of several father and son pairs to play State of Origin, including Wayne and Mitchell Pearce, and Steve and Josh Morris/Brett Morris, all for NSW.

== Post-football and personal life ==
Grothe currently plays in a band, Eric Grothe and the Gurus.

== Sources ==
- Whiticker, Alan and Hudson, Glen (1998) The Encyclopedia of Rugby League Players 3rd ed Gary Allen Pty. Ltd, Smithfield, NSW.
- Middleton, David (ed) (1996) Rugby League 1996 HarperCollins Publishers, Pymble, NSW
