= Brett Kenny =

Australia international rugby league footballer

Personal information
- Full name: Brett Edward Kenny
- Born: 16 March 1961 (age 65) Canterbury, New South Wales, Australia

Playing information
- Height: 181 cm (5 ft 11 in)
- Weight: 91 kg (14 st 5 lb)
- Position: Five-eighth, Centre, Lock
Club
Years	Team	Pld	T	G	FG	P
1980–93	Parramatta Eels	265	110	0	0	410
1984–85	Wigan	25	19	0	0	76
	Total	290	129	0	0	486
Representative
Years	Team	Pld	T	G	FG	P
1982–87	New South Wales	17	2	0	0	8
1982–87	Australia	17	10	0	0	36
1983–87	NSW City	4	1	0	0	4

Brett "Bert" Edward Kenny (born 16 March 1961) is an Australian former professional rugby league footballer who played in the 1980s and 1990s. He was a centre and five-eighth for the Australian national team and New South Wales Blues representative sides, and the Parramatta Eels. He played in 17 Tests, made 17 State of Origin appearances and won 4 premierships with Parramatta. He is considered one of the nation's finest footballers of the 20th century.

== Background ==
Kenny was born in Canterbury, New South Wales, Australia.

== Playing career ==
Kenny made his first grade debut for Parramatta in round 14 of the 1980 season against South Sydney coming off the bench in a 28–12 loss at Redfern Oval. In the 1981 season, Kenny was part of the Parramatta side which claimed their first ever premiership defeating Newtown 20–11 at the Sydney Cricket Ground with Kenny scoring two tries in the match. In the following two seasons, Parramatta defeated Manly-Warringah in both grand finals, with Kenny scoring two tries in each final.

The 1984 season saw Kenny taste his first defeat in a grand final as Parramatta lost to Canterbury-Bankstown 6–4 at the Sydney Cricket Ground. In the 1985 season, Parramatta reached the preliminary final but were defeated again by Canterbury 26–0. During the Australian summer of 1985, Kenny was signed to Wigan in England, where he starred in one of the most famous Challenge Cup finals of them all. Lining up against his Parra halfback partner Peter Sterling (who was playing for Hull F.C.) in front of 100,000 fans at Wembley, Kenny led Wigan to a gripping 28–24 win, capturing the Lance Todd Trophy as man of the match. The image of Kenny, hands stuffed into the pockets of his tracktop and calmly wandering about the pitch after the pre-match presentations, has become an enduring legacy of his grace under pressure. In 1986, Kenny claimed his fourth premiership as a player when Parramatta defeated Canterbury in the grand final 4–2 at the Sydney Cricket Ground. The grand final was and still is the only decider where neither team scored a try.

Kenny played with Parramatta for another seven years up until the end of the 1993 season. The club failed to reach the finals from 1986 on-wards whilst Kenny remained at Parramatta. His final game for the side came in round 22 1993 against Balmain which Parramatta won 22–16 at Parramatta Stadium to send Kenny out on a winning note.

== Statistical highlights ==
He held the Parramatta club record for the most first grade games (265) from 1993 till 2010 when Nathan Hindmarsh passed his total, and also held the record for most tries for the club (110), which was only surpassed by Luke Burt during the 2011 NRL season. His 21 tries in the 1983 season stands third behind Semi Radradra's 24 and Steve Ella's 23 for most tries in a season.

Kenny holds the record feat of being the only player to have scored two tries in three (consecutive) grand finals, from 1981 to 1983. In the 1986 Grand Final against Canterbury, Kenny also looked to have scored two tries, but had them both disallowed by the referee in controversial circumstances.

In the 12 State of Origin games where he was selected as starting five-eighth for NSW, Kenny had an eight games to four winning advantage over Wally Lewis.

== Accolades ==
- Dally M Representative Player of the Year: 1986
- Grand Final Man of the Match (Clive Churchill Medal): 1982, 1983
- Lance Todd Trophy: 1985
- Golden Boot Award: 1985
- Rated No. 27 in Rugby League Week's Top 100 players: 1992
- Named in NRL Team of the 1980s: 2004

== Post playing ==
In 2000, he was awarded the Australian Sports Medal for his contribution to Australia's international standing in rugby league.

Kenny made a cameo appearance in the 2006 film, Footy Legends. Also in 2006, Kenny coached the Penrith Panthers Jersey Flegg side which won the premiership, defeating Newcastle in the grand final, but was terminated from his position afterwards.

In February 2008, Kenny was named in the list of Australia's 100 Greatest Players (1908–2007) which was commissioned by the NRL and ARL to celebrate the code's centenary year in Australia.

In 2010, Kenny became the coach of the Wentworthville Magpies in the NSW Cup competition, taking over from Rip Taylor. In May 2010, Kenny spoke to the Daily Telegraph and talked about coaching Wentworthville and since retiring as a player he had been struggling financially. He went on to say "I've only got a 12-month contract with Wentworthville. The pay is pretty ordinary. It's not enough to live on, I've set myself a time limit to coach at the highest level. I'll give it two years, then I'll walk away from rugby league and I won't worry about it any more. I'll do something else. There's no point flogging a dead horse and waiting for next year. I can't keep living like this".

In July 2017, he was diagnosed with Non-Hodgkin lymphoma cancer in the stomach.
