= 1983 Queensland rugby league tour of Papua New Guinea and England =

The 1983 Queensland rugby league tour of Papua New Guinea and England was a tour that took place in two parts. In June 1983 the Queensland team took in a one-week tour of Papua New Guinea, then following the end of the 1983 Brisbane Rugby League season, the team embarked on a 3-game, 2 week tour of England in October.

== Leadership ==
The team was coached by Arthur Beetson and was captained by Wally Lewis.

== Touring squad ==
Chris Phelan who played for the 1983 Sydney premiers Parramatta was the only non-Queensland based player in the 21 man touring squad. Paul Bartier, Martin Bella, Terry Butler, Wayne Challis, Greg Conescu and Mal Meninga only played on the Papua New Guinea portion of the tour.

Player	Club	Position(s)	Games	Tries	Goals	F/Goals	Points
Paul Bartier	Norths Devils	Five-eighth, Lock	2	1	0	0	4
Martin Bella	Easts Tigers	Prop	2	0	0	0	0
Shane Bernardin	Norths Devils	Hooker, Prop	2	0	0	0	0
Mitch Brennan	Redcliffe Dolphins	Wing, Centre	3	2	0	0	8
Larry Briggenshaw	Easts Tigers	Halfback	2	0	0	0	0
Terry Butler	Wynnum Manly Seagulls	Centre, Wing	2	4	0	0	16
Wayne Challis	Souths Magpies	Wing	2	1	0	0	4
Greg Conescu	Norths Devils	Hooker	2	0	0	0	0
Greg Dowling	Wynnum Manly Seagulls	Prop	2	1	0	0	4
Brett French	Wynnum Manly Seagulls	Centre, Wing	3	2	0	0	8
Wally Fullerton Smith	Redcliffe Dolphins	Second-row, Lock	4	3	0	0	12
Cavill Heugh	Easts Tigers	Lock	4	3	0	0	12
Gavin Jones	Easts Tigers	Prop	3	0	0	0	0
Paul Khan	Easts Tigers	Prop	1	0	0	0	0
Joe Kilroy	Norths Devils	Halfback, Fullback	3	2	0	0	8
Wally Lewis (c)	Fortitude Valley Diehards	Five-eighth, Centre	5	3	3	0	18
Wayne Lindenberg	Easts Tigers	Five-eighth	2	2	0	0	8
Shane McNally	Easts Tigers	Hooker	2	0	11	0	22
Mal Meninga	Souths Magpies	Centre	2	3	8	0	28
Gene Miles	Wynnum Manly Seagulls	Centre	5	5	0	0	20
Mark Murray	Redcliffe Dolphins	Halfback	4	0	0	0	0
Bryan Niebling	Redcliffe Dolphins	Second-row	4	1	0	0	4
Trevor Paterson	Easts Tigers	Lock	2	0	0	0	0
Chris Phelan	Parramatta Eels (NSWRFL)	Second-row	3	1	0	0	4
Colin Scott	Wynnum Manly Seagulls	Fullback, Wing	4	4	2	0	20
Steve Stacey	Easts Tigers	Wing	3	2	0	0	8
Brad Tessmann	Souths Magpies	Second-row, Prop	3	5	0	0	20

== Papua New Guinea ==
Both matches in Papua New Guinea took place in the two weeks between Games 1 and 2 of the 1983 State of Origin series.

Wednesday, 15 June

Highlands Zone	16 – 34	Queensland
Tries: Ifiso Segeyaro, Dekot Koki; Goals: K. Tifati (4)		Tries: Wayne Challis, Terry Butler, Cavill Heugh, Mal Meninga, Richie Poulsen, Brad Tessmann; Goals: Wally Lewis (1), Mal Meninga (1), Colin Scott (1)

Rebiamul Oval, Mount Hagen
Attendance: 8,000

Highlands Zone: . Reserves – . Coach –

Queensland: . Reserves – Colin Scott, Steve Stacey, Terry Butler, Gene Miles, Wayne Challis, Paul Bartier, Joe Kilroy, Martin Bella, Greg Conescu, Richie Poulsen, Brad Tessmann, Bryan Niebling, Cavill Heugh. Reserves – Mal Meninga, Wally Lewis (c), Mark Murray, Wally Fullerton Smith

Saturday, 18 June

PNG Presidents XIII	3 – 106	Queensland
Tries: Goals: K. Keveu; Field Goals; Poka Kila		Tries: Brad Tessmann (4), Terry Butler (3), Wally Fullerton Smith (2), Mal Meninga (2), Gene Miles (2), Colin Scott (2), Steve Stacey (2), Paul Bartier, Cavill Heugh, Bryan Niebling; Goals: Mal Meninga (7), Colin Scott (5), Wally Lewis (1)

Lloyd Robson Oval, Port Moresby
Attendance: 12,000

PNG Presidents XIII: . Reserves – . Coach –

Queensland: Joe Kilroy, Terry Butler, Mal Meninga, Gene Miles, Wayne Challis, Wally Lewis (c), Mark Murray, Brad Tessmann, Greg Conescu, Martin Bella, Bryan Niebling, Wally Fullerton Smith, Paul Bartier. Reserves – Richie Poulsen, Cavill Heugh, Steve Stacey, Colin Scott

== England ==
Sunday, 16 October

Hull Kingston Rovers	8 – 6	Queensland
Tries: Mike Smith; Goals: George Fairbairn (2)		Tries: Wally Lewis; Goals: Wally Lewis (1)

Craven Park, Hull
Attendance: 6,383
Referee: Robin Whitfield
Player of the Match: Gordon Smith

Hull KR: George Fairbairn (c), Garry Clark, Mike Smith, John Dorahy, Gary Prohm, Steve Hartley, Gordon Smith, Roy Holdstock, David Watkinson, Mark Broadhurst, Phil Hogan, Chris Burton, David Hall. Res – David Laws, Andy Kelly, Tracy Lazenby. Coach – Roger Millward

Queensland: Colin Scott, Steve Stacey, Gene Miles, Brett French, Mitch Brennan, Wally Lewis (c), Mark Murray, Paul Khan, Shane Bernardin, Brad Tessmann, Bryan Neibling, Chris Phelan, Wally Fullerton-Smith. Res – Joe Kilroy, Wayne Lindenberg, Trevor Paterson, Gavin Jones

Sunday, 23 October

Wigan	2 – 40	Queensland
Tries: Goals: Colin Whitfield (1)		Tries: Wayne Lindenberg (2), Mitch Brennan, Brett French, Cavill Heugh, Joe Kilroy, Gene Miles, Chris Phelan; Goals: Shane McNally (4)

Central Park, Wigan
Attendance: 9,749
Referee: Ron Campbell
Player of the Match: Wayne Lindenberg

Wigan: Colin Whitfield, Ronnie Braithwaite, David Stephenson, Tim Wilby, Henderson Gill, David Wood, Jimmy Fairhurst, Kerry Hemsley, Howie Tamati, Brian Case, Danny Campbell, Graeme West (c), John Pendlebury. Res – Shaun Wane, Mick Scott, Brian Dunn. Coach – Alex Murphy

Queensland: Joe Kilroy, Brett French, Gene Miles, Wally Lewis (c), Mitch Brennan, Wayne Lindenberg, Larry Briggenshaw, Greg Dowling, Shane McNally, Chris Phelan, Gavin Jones, Cavill Heugh, Trevor Paterson

Sunday, 29 October

Leeds	2 – 58	Queensland
Tries: Goals: David Creasser (1)		Tries: Wally Lewis (2), Gene Miles (2), Colin Scott (2), Mitch Brennan, Greg Dowling, Wally Fullerton-Smith, Joe Kilroy; Goals: Shane McNally (7)

Headingley, Leeds
Attendance: 5,647
Referee: Billy Thompson
Player of the Match: Wally Lewis

Leeds: Ian Wilkinson, Paul Prendiville, David Creasser, Steve Martin, Andrew Smith, John Holmes, Kevin Dick, Ron Dickinson, Russ Sowden, Keith Rayne, Kevin Rayne, Kevin Squire, David Herron. Res – David Heselwood, Colin Cooper, Garry Clark Kevin James. Coach – Robin Dewhurst

Queensland: Joe Kilroy, Brett French, Gene Miles, Mitch Brennan, Colin Scott, Wally Lewis (c), Mark Murray, Greg Dowling, Shane McNally, Shane Bernardin, Chris Phelan, Bryan Neibling, Wally Fullerton-Smith. Res – Gavin Jones, Cavill Heugh, Larry Briggenshaw

== Aftermath ==
As had happened at the end of the unbeaten 1982 Kangaroo tour (which Wally Lewis, Gene Miles and Mark Murray had all been a part of with Lewis the Kangaroos vice-captain), a number of the Queensland players were targeted by cashed-up English clubs. Wally Lewis, despite feeling jaded due to not having a break from the game since the end of the 1981 BRL season, accepted a £30,000 offer to join Wakefield Trinity for 10 games before returning to Australia for the start of the 1984 BRL season where he would move from his junior club Fortitude Valley Diehards to join the Wynnum Manly Seagulls.

Greg Dowling would join Wigan for a season in 1985–86 season. Wally Fullerton Smith joined Leeds for the 1984–85 season. Joe Kilroy joined Halifax and Chris Phelan joined Oldham.
