= 1983 State of Origin series =

Australian rugby league series

- Won by: Queensland (2nd title)
- Series margin: 2–1
- Points scored: 117
- Attendance: 77,116 (ave. 25,705 per match)
- Top points scorer(s): Mal Meninga (30)
- Top try scorer(s): Chris Anderson (3)

The 1983 State of Origin series was the second time the annual three-game series between the New South Wales and Queensland rugby league teams was played entirely under "state of origin" selection rules.

After the Australian team had swept all before them in 1982, including sweeping New Zealand in the mid-season tests, before embarking on the highly successful 1982 Kangaroo tour where they became the first touring side to go through undefeated, winning all three Ashes tests against Great Britain and the two tests against France, the 1983 State of Origin series was billed as something of an unofficial World Championship. The winning state would have bragging rights over who had the best representative team in the world outside of the test team.

== Game I ==
Tuesday, 7 June 1983

Queensland	24–12	New South Wales
(8 - 2 t) Wally Lewis (4 - 1 t) Mark Murray (12 - 6 g) Mal Meninga	(Report)	Phil Sigsworth (4 - 2 g); Eric Grothe, Sr. (4 - 1 t); Steve Ella (4 - 1 t)

Lang Park, Brisbane
Attendance: 29,412
Referee: Barry Gomersall
Player of the Match: Wally Lewis

Game I of 1983 was refereed by Barry Gomersall, his second Origin fixture following Game II, 1982. Penrith's Darryl Brohman was making his Origin debut and with his ball skills and strong kicking game had been considered a strong possibility to force his way into the Australian side due to play New Zealand a few days later. Early in the first half Brohman's jaw was broken by a sickening elbow from Blues' second-rower Les Boyd which sidelined him for the rest of the season. Gomersall awarded a penalty for the high shot, but allowed Boyd to stay on the field.

Boyd was later cited by the judiciary and received a twelve-month suspension - the first of two massive barrings that eventually saw him relocate his career to England. It was to be Boyd's last representative appearance after 17 Tests and two Kangaroo Tours. Brohman meanwhile spent three months on the sideline nursing the injury and never represented Australia.

On the scoreboard Wally Lewis took control of the match. He scored twice in the first half and with Mal Meninga landing the conversions and potting three penalty goals, the Maroons lead 18-0 after 30 minutes and were able to ward off a spirited New South Wales comeback.

== Game II ==
For Game II of the series, every member of the Blues' backline came from the defending premiers, the Parramatta Eels, with the exception of Eastern Suburbs fullback Marty Gurr. Players were required to represent their clubs in the season rounds between Origin clashes and a number of New South Wales players from Game I were injured in that weekend's round and unavailable for Game II. The Eels backline consisted of Neil Hunt and Eric Grothe (wings), Mick Cronin and Steve Ella (centres), Brett Kenny (five-eighth) and Peter Sterling (halfback). The club also provided lock forward Ray Price and replacement forward Stan Jurd giving them eight of the Blues' 15 players, the highest ever single club representation for NSW in Origin history.

Tuesday, 21 June 1983

New South Wales	10–6	Queensland
(2 - 1 g) Mick Cronin (4 - 1 t) Neil Hunt (4 - 1 t) Steve Ella	(Report)	Mal Meninga (6 - 1t,1g)

SCG, Sydney
Attendance: 21,620
Referee: John Gocher
Player of the Match: Peter Sterling

The match became a battle of attrition on a muddy SCG and the Blues kept the series alive with a 10-6 victory in which the Parramatta connection scored all the points - tries to Hunt and Ella, converted by Cronin. For Queensland Mal Meninga scored and converted a try. Queensland had a chance to take the lead when captain Wally Lewis crossed next to the posts midway through the second half, but referee John Gocher ruled obstruction against Gene Miles and disallowed the try.

Kangaroo tour test halfback Peter Sterling continued his ongoing selection battle with Canterbury-Bankstown half Steve Mortimer and fully repaid the selectors' confidence masterfully orchestrating the Blues' play and winning the first of his four Origin man-of-the-match awards. When Mortimer did come on in the second half it was actually on the wing replacing an injured Eric Grothe, though it did not take him long to get involved in the game as an extra half for the Blues.

== Game III ==
Tuesday, 28 June 1983

Queensland	43–22	New South Wales
(4 - 1 t) Gene Miles (4 - 1 t) Steve Stacey (4 - 1 t) Bryan Neibling (4 - 1 t) Dave Brown (12 - 6 g) Mal Meninga (4 - 1 t) Greg Conescu (2 - 1 g) Colin Scott (1 - 1 fg) Wally Lewis (8 - 2 t) Mitch Brennan	(Report)	Mick Cronin (6 - 3 g); Chris Anderson (12 - 3 t); Steve Mortimer (4 - 1 t)

Lang Park, Brisbane
Attendance: 26,084
Referee: Robin Whitfield
Player of the Match: Wally Lewis

The series decider at Lang Park was billed as "the clash of the decade" but Lewis was brilliant and the game was never a contest. Queensland led 21-0 at half-time and 33-0 before the Blues scored four late consolation tries.

The 43-22 Maroons victory was the biggest since 1955 and set the standing record for the most points scored by Queensland in an Origin match and also featured another record - the first time three tries were scored by a single player in an Origin match (by Blues' winger Chris Anderson). Another record was set a week later when Queensland had nine players selected in the Australian side to meet the Kiwis.

Peter Sterling missed the deciding game due to injury and with Steve Mortimer nipping at his heels it proved an expensive absence enabling Mortimer to go on to retain the New South Wales position, win back his Australian jumper and keep Sterling at bay in their representative rivalry for the next two years.

== Teams ==
=== New South Wales Blues ===
Position	Game 1	Game 2	Game 3
Fullback	Greg Brentnall	Marty Gurr	
Wing	Chris Anderson	Neil Hunt	
Centre	Phil Sigsworth	Mick Cronin	
Centre	Brett Kenny	Steve Ella	
Wing	Eric Grothe, Sr.		Chris Anderson
Five-eighth	Alan Thompson	Brett Kenny	
Halfback	Peter Sterling		Steve Mortimer
Prop	Geoff Gerard		Geoff Bugden
Hooker	Max Krilich (c)	Ray Brown	Max Krilich (c)
Prop	Geoff Bugden	Lindsay Johnston	
Second row	Les Boyd	Gavin Miller	Stan Jurd
Second row	Wayne Pearce		Paul Field
Lock	Ray Price	Ray Price (c)	Gavin Miller
Interchange	Steve Ella	Steve Mortimer	Kevin Hastings
Interchange	Ray Brown	Stan Jurd	Ray Brown
Coach	Ted Glossop		

=== Queensland Maroons ===
Position	Game 1	Game 2	Game 3
Fullback	Colin Scott		
Wing	John Ribot	Terry Butler	Steve Stacey
Centre	Mal Meninga		
Centre	Gene Miles		
Wing	Steve Stacey	Chris Close	Mitch Brennan
Five-eighth	Wally Lewis (c)		
Halfback	Mark Murray		
Prop	Brad Tessmann		
Hooker	Greg Conescu		
Prop	Darryl Brohman	Dave Brown	
Second row	Bryan Niebling		
Second row	Paul Vautin	Wally Fullerton Smith	
Lock	Wally Fullerton Smith	Paul Vautin	
Interchange	Brett French		Bruce Astill
Interchange	Dave Brown	Ross Henrick	Gavin Jones
Coach	Arthur Beetson		

== See also ==
- 1983 NSWRFL season

== Sources ==
- Big League's 25 Years of Origin Collectors' Edition, News Magazines, Surry Hills, Sydney
