= 1986 State of Origin series =

Australian rugby league series

- Won by: New South Wales (2nd title)
- Series margin: 3-0
- Points scored: 116
- Attendance: 94,840 (ave. 31,613 per match)
- Top points scorer(s): Michael O'Connor (24)
- Top try scorer(s): Michael O'Connor, Wayne Pearce; Dale Shearer, Les Kiss (2)

The 1986 State of Origin series was the fifth year that the annual three-match series between New South Wales and Queensland was contested entirely under "state of origin" selection rules. It was the year that New South Wales finally asserted some dominance and won the series in the first ever 3-0 Origin whitewash. It was an inauspicious introduction to Origin coaching for Wayne Bennett who soon afterwards began plotting a reversal of fortunes that would lead to a pending period of Queensland dominance.

== Games ==
=== Game I ===
Tuesday, 27 May 1986

Queensland	16 – 22	New South Wales
Tries: Gene Miles 1 Greg Dowling 1 Goals: Mal Meninga 4/4; Field Goals: Wally Lewis 0/1	1st: 10 - 12; 2nd: 6 - 10; Report	Tries: Garry Jack 1 Chris Mortimer 1 Royce Simmons 1 Andrew Farrar 1 Goals: Michael O'Connor 3/4; Field Goals: Michael O'Connor 0/2

Lang Park, Brisbane
Attendance: 33,066
Referee: Kevin Roberts
Player of the Match: Royce Simmons

The Blues finally brought to Origin a passion that had hitherto been associated mainly with Queensland and fielded a halves pairing of Peter Sterling and Brett Kenny that found the measure of Maroons star Wally Lewis. Blues hooker Royce Simmons typified the newfound New South Wales' spirit when early in the opening game he was knocked out, after a strong hit by Queensland's Greg Dowling. He staggered back into position, falling over and regaining his feet then waving trainers away as he took his place in the defensive formation before pulling off a try-saving tackle on his own tryline soon after.

The Blues led 12-2 early but by half-time the lead was cut to 12-10. Two minutes after the break Queensland forged to the front when prop Greg Dowling scored after centre Gene Miles recovered a Wally Lewis bomb. The Maroons then began to tire and Man Of The Match Royce Simmons scored from dummy half to spark a magnificent comeback, dummying past a bewildered Wally Lewis. A mistake by Queensland winger Dale Shearer opened the door for Blues' centre Andrew Farrar to score his first Origin try and the Blues led 22-16 with 13 minutes remaining and were able to hold on to a lead.

Simmons was interviewed in 2010: "The Queenslanders were going 'Ooohh, yeahh' when I fell over. They were really cheering me or bagging me or something...everytime I fell over. All I kept thinking was 'I can't get replaced; if I get replaced there goes my opportunity' so I struggled to get back up and few minutes later I was OK. It was a good win...and we played a very good Queensland side to do it"

=== Game II ===
Queensland's preparation for game II was disrupted by injuries to key players and selectors were forced to name one of the Maroons' most inexperienced line-ups.

Tuesday, 10 June 1986

New South Wales	24 – 20	Queensland
Tries: Andrew Farrar 1 Michael O'Connor 1 Wayne Pearce 1 Brett Kenny 1 Noel Cleal 1 Goals: Michael O'Connor 2/6; 5 Min. Sin Bin: Steve Roach 1	1st: 12 - 12; 2nd: 12 - 8 Report	Tries: Ian French 1 Bob Lindner 1 Les Kiss 1 Dale Shearer 1 Goals: Mal Meninga 2/4

Sydney Cricket Ground
Attendance: 40,707
Referee: Barry Gomersall
Player of the Match: Peter Sterling

Before a record Origin crowd of 40,707 at the SCG, the class of Lewis and Queensland again led into the second half 16-12 after 52 minutes before Sterling and Kenny engineered a New South Wales onslaught. Man-of-the-match Sterling then threw a sweetly timed pass for Kenny to take New South Wales to an 18-16 lead and four minutes later second-rower Noel Cleal crashed over between the posts for an unassailable 24-16 scoreline. Queensland scored in the final minutes through Shearer but their hopes of a last-ditch victory were dashed.

=== Game III ===
For the third year running the final match of the series was a dead rubber, but with Test positions on the line for the three clashes with New Zealand and the end of season Kangaroo tour plus the opportunity for New South Wales to become the first team to win 3-0, there was plenty to play for.

Tuesday, 1 July 1986

Queensland	16 – 18	New South Wales
Tries: Dale Shearer 1 Gary Belcher 1 Greg Conescu 1 Les Kiss 1 Goals: Mal Meninga 0/3; Les Kiss 0/2; Field Goals: Wally Lewis 0/1	1st: 16 - 16; 2nd: 0 - 2 Report	Tries: Michael O'Connor 1 Wayne Pearce 1 Peter Tunks 1 Goals: Michael O'Connor 3/4; Field Goals: Terry Lamb 0/1

Lang Park, Brisbane
Attendance: 21,097
Referee: Kevin Roberts
Player of the Match: Brett Kenny

The first half produced one of Origin's most frenetic periods. By the time the teams left the field at the break seven tries had been scored and the scores were locked at 16-all. In the second stanza no more tries were added. The game was won by a Michael O'Connor penalty goal after referee Kevin Roberts had penalised Maroon's skipper Lewis for failing to clear the ruck.

With the victory New South Wales enjoyed the first ever 3-0 series whitewash.

== Teams ==
=== New South Wales ===
Position	Game 1	Game 2	Game 3
Fullback	Garry Jack		
Wing	Steve Morris	Brian Hetherington	Brian Johnston
Centre	Michael O'Connor		
Centre	Chris Mortimer		
Wing	Andrew Farrar		Eric Grothe, Sr.
Five-Eighth	Brett Kenny		
Halfback	Peter Sterling		
Prop	Steve Roach		
Hooker	Royce Simmons		
Prop	Peter Tunks		
Second Row	Steve Folkes		
Second Row	Noel Cleal		
Lock	Wayne Pearce (c)		
Replacement	Terry Lamb		
Replacement	David Gillespie		
Coach	Ron Willey		

=== Queensland ===
Position	Game 1	Game 2	Game 3
Fullback	Colin Scott	Gary Belcher	
Wing	Dale Shearer		
Centre	Mal Meninga		
Centre	Gene Miles		
Wing	Chris Close	Les Kiss	
Five-Eighth	Wally Lewis (c)		
Halfback	Mark Murray		
Prop	Greg Dowling	Cavill Heugh	Brad Tessmann
Hooker	Greg Conescu		
Prop	Dave Brown	Darryl Brohman	Cavill Heugh
Second Row	Bryan Niebling	Bob Lindner	Bryan Niebling
Second Row	Gavin Jones		
Lock	Bob Lindner	Ian French	Bob Lindner
Replacement	Peter Jackson		
Replacement	Ian French	Brad Tessmann	Ian French
Coach	Wayne Bennett		

== See also ==
- 1986 Winfield Cup

== Sources ==
- Big League's 25 Years of Origin Collectors' Edition, News Magazines, Surry Hills, Sydney
