= Magic Round =

Magic Round may refer to:

- Magic Weekend, English Super League competition
- Summer Bash, English Rugby League Second Division competition
- Magic Round (NRL), National Rugby League competition based on the English Super League
- Gather Round, Australian Football League round based on the NRL concept
- Unite Round, A-League round based on the NRL concept
