= Terence Butler =

Terence Butler may refer to:

- Geezer Butler (born Terence Butler 1949), English bassist of the band Black Sabbath
- Terry Butler (born 1967), American bassist of the band Six Feet Under
- Terry Butler (rugby league) (1958–2016), Australian rugby league footballer
