= Marty Gurr =

Australian rugby league footballer

Personal information
- Full name: Marty Leonard Gurr
- Born: 11 September 1958 (age 67) Newcastle, New South Wales, Australia

Playing information
- Height: 183 cm (6 ft 0 in)
- Position: Fullback
Club
Years	Team	Pld	T	G	FG	P
1979–83	Eastern Suburbs	85	34	0	1	120
1984	South Sydney	15	4	0	0	16
1985–88	Manly Sea Eagles	50	8	8	8	32
1987–88	Leeds	28	11	0	0	44
	Total	178	57	8	9	212
Representative
Years	Team	Pld	T	G	FG	P
1983	New South Wales	2	0	0	0	0

Marty Gurr (born 11 September 1958) is a former professional rugby league footballer who played in the 1970s and 1980s. He played in the New South Wales Rugby League (NSWRL) competition. He primarily played at fullback for Eastern Suburbs, Leeds, South Sydney Rabbitohs and Manly-Warringah Sea Eagles.

== Playing career ==
Gurr was selected to represent the New South Wales Blues as a fullback for games II and III of the 1983 State of Origin series.

Gurr played fullback in Leeds' 14–15 defeat by St. Helens in the 1987–88 John Player Special Trophy Final during the 1987–88 season at Central Park, Wigan on Saturday 9 January 1988.

== Post playing ==
After retiring from the game, Gurr moved into coaching, management and recruitment roles with Manly and then Souths.
