= Peter Roe (rugby league) =

English RL coach and former rugby league footballer

Personal information
- Born: Keighley, Yorkshire, England

Playing information
- Position: Centre
Club
Years	Team	Pld	T	G	FG	P
1974–75	Keighley	0	0	0	0	0
1975–81	Bradford Northern	100	33	0	0	99
1981–82	York	21	5	0	0	15
1982–85	Hunslet RLFC	81	22	0	0	81
1985–87	Keighley	49	4	0	0	16
	Total	251	64	0	0	211
Representative
Years	Team	Pld	T	G	FG	P
1974–77	Yorkshire	3	1	0	0	3
1976–77	Great Britain U-24	4	1	0	0	3

Coaching information
Club
Years	Team	Gms	W	D	L	W%
1985–86	Keighley	0	0	0	0
1990–91	Halifax RLFC	5	2	0	3	40
1991–94	Keighley Cougars	0	0	0	0
1994–96	Barrow RLFC	0	0	0	0
1996–97	Swinton Lions	31	21	0	10	68
1999–01	Featherstone Rovers	80	53	4	23	66
2001–02	Wakefield Trinity	21	5	0	16	24
2003–03	Swinton Lions	32	12	2	18	38
2004–05	Barrow RLFC	56	24	2	30	43
2006–07	Keighley Cougars	30	6	1	23	20
2011	Bramley Buffaloes	0	0	0	0
	Total	255	123	9	123	48

Peter Roe is a rugby league footballer who played in the 1970s and 1980s, and coached in the 1980s, 1990s and 2000s. He played at club level for Keighley, Bradford Northern, York and Hunslet, as a centre, and coached at club level for Keighley (three spells), Halifax, Barrow (two spells), Swinton (two spells), Featherstone Rovers and Wakefield Trinity.

== Early life ==
At an early age, Roe played football and was given a trial at Manchester United. Roe had also received interest from Sheffield United, but he suffered a back injury in an accident which prevented him from playing sport for 12 months. Once Roe had recovered, he had turned his attention to playing rugby league instead.

== Playing career ==
=== Keighley ===
Roe started his professional career at Keighley and was promoted to the first team in 1974. Whilst at Keighley he represented Yorkshire at the age of 18.

=== Bradford Northern ===
In December 1975, Roe was transferred to Bradford Northern for a fee of £7,500. He played 99 games under Roy Francis and Peter Fox, who coached the team to back-to-back championships. His playing position was at centre. Roe was selected to play for Great Britain in France but had to pull out due to a serious knee injury and subsequently had to retire prematurely from the game when Bradford Northern cashed in their insurance policy (£30,000) on Roe in 1981. Roe proved the medical people wrong and fought his way back to fitness but was not allowed to play again for Bradford Northern due to the legalities of the payout. He finished his playing career with York and Hunslet.

== Coaching career ==
He began his coaching career at Keighley, taking over from the late Geoff Peggs who 'died in office' in 1985. He left the following year.

Peter Roe was appointed as head coach at Halifax for season 1990-91 when they achieved promotion along with Salford who were their opponents in the Divisional Final at Old Trafford. Roe was removed from office 24-hours later when he refused to re-apply for his own job. The Halifax board stated that he did not have the required experience for a club in the top division. He returned to Keighley in September 1991 and coached the club to the division three title in 1992-93 and stayed at his home town club until 1994.

He was coach of Barrow for a 15-month period, ending in January 1996.

Peter Roe led Swinton to promotion from Division Two in 1996.

Peter Roe was in charge of Featherstone Rovers from 1999 to October 2001 on a part-time contract, before leaving to take charge of Wakefield Trinity. He was replaced at Featherstone Rovers by his assistant Ian Fairhurst.

In October 2001, Roe left his part-time role as Featherstone Rovers coach and his job as a benefit fraud investigator to take up a full-time head coach post with Wakefield Trinity. He was sacked in July 2002 and was replaced by his assistant Shane McNally.

Peter Roe quit as coach of Swinton in September 2003, after less than a year in charge.

In Peter Roe's second spell with Barrow, they were National League Two champions in 2004, their first trophy for 20 years with 14 wins from their 18 games. Roe won Coach of the Year in the process. They were promoted to National League One but were relegated back to National League Two at the end of the 2005 season after winning just one of their 18 matches. The financial situation at the club forced a review of the coaching structure and the position of head coach was made part-time and the club parted company with Peter Roe.

Peter Roe returned for his second spell in charge of Keighley at the end of 2005, succeeding Gary Moorby and starting the rebuilding process of a club still ravaged by relegation from National League One. The majority of players had left and money was in short supply. player-coach Barry Eaton was the only major signing and promising youngsters were blooded; the side struggled to compete and they finished joint-bottom. Roe gave Eaton full control as player-coach in 2007.
