= 2019 Barrow Raiders season =

- Championship Rank: 10th
- Play-off result: N/A
- Challenge Cup: N/A
- 2019 record: Wins: 1; draws: 1; losses: 3
- Points scored: For: 72; against: 138

Team information
- Chairman: Steve Neale
- Head Coach: Paul Crarey
- Stadium: Craven Park
- High attendance: 1,514 vs. Sheffield Eagles

Top scorers
- Tries: Stargroth Amean (4)
- Goals: James Dallimore (6)
- Points: Stargroth Amean (16)
List of seasons	2020 →

This article details the Barrow Raiders rugby league football club's 2019 season.

== Fixtures and results ==
LEGEND
Win
Draw
Loss

2019 Championship

Date	Competition	Rnd	Vrs	H/A	Venue	Result	Score	Tries	Goals	Att	Live on TV	Report
3 February 2019	Championship	1	Batley Bulldogs	A	Mount Pleasant	W	22-18	Spedding 2, Smith, Charnock	Dallimore 3/4	755	-	https://www.bbc.com/sport/rugby-league/match/ERLP4117808
10 February 2019	Championship	2	Sheffield Eagles	H	Craven Park	L	24-22	Amean 2, Puara Jr, Johnson	Dallimore 3/4	1,514	TV	https://www.bbc.com/sport/rugby-league/match/EVP2938994
17 February 2019	Championship	3	York City Knights	A	Bootham Crescent	L	56-0	Try Scorers	Goal Scorers	1,575	TV	https://www.bbc.com/sport/rugby-league/match/EVP2939005
24 February 2019	Championship	4	Dewsbury Rams	H	Craven Park	D	20-20	Stack 2, Johnson	Charnock3/3, Johnson1/1	1,321	TV	https://www.bbc.com/sport/rugby-league/match/EVP2939007
3 March 2019	Championship	5	Rochdale Hornets	A	Crown Oil Arena	L	20-8	Amean 2	Goal Scorers	Attendance	TV	https://www.bbc.com/sport/rugby-league/match/EVP2939017
10 March 2019	Championship	6	Widnes Vikings	H	Craven Park	W/D/L	Score	Try Scorers	Goal Scorers	Attendance	TV	Report
17 March 2019	Championship	7	Featherstone Rovers	A	LD Nutrition Stadium	W/D/L	Score	Try Scorers	Goal Scorers	Attendance	TV	Report
24 March 2019	Championship	8	Leigh Centurions	H		W/D/L	Score	Try Scorers	Goal Scorers	Attendance	TV	Report
7 April 2019	Championship	9	Dewsbury Rams	A		W/D/L	Score	Try Scorers	Goal Scorers	Attendance	TV	Report
14 April 2019	Championship	10	Toronto Wolfpack	H	Craven Park	W/D/L	Score	Try Scorers	Goal Scorers	Attendance	TV	Report
22 April 2019	Championship	11	Bradford Bulls	A		W/D/L	Score	Try Scorers	Goal Scorers	Attendance	TV	Report
28 April 2019	Championship	12	Rochdale Hornets	H		W/D/L	Score	Try Scorers	Goal Scorers	Attendance	TV	Report
4 May 2019	Championship	13	Toronto Wolfpack	A	Lamport Stadium	W/D/L	Score	Try Scorers	Goal Scorers	Attendance	TV	Report
18 May 2019	Summer Bash	14	Halifax R.L.F.C.	N	Bloomfield Road	W/D/L	Score	Try Scorers	Goal Scorers	Attendance	Sky Sports	Report
26 May 2019	Championship	15	Bradford Bulls	H	Post Office Road	W/D/L	Score	Try Scorers	Goal Scorers	Attendance	TV	Report
9 June 2019	Championship	16	Batley Bulldogs	H		W/D/L	Score	Try Scorers	Goal Scorers	Attendance	TV	Report
16 June 2019	Championship	17	Leigh Centurions	A	Leigh Sports Village	W/D/L	Score	Try Scorers	Goal Scorers	Attendance	TV	Report
23 June 2019	Championship	18	Halifax R.L.F.C.	H		W/D/L	Score	Try Scorers	Goal Scorers	Attendance	TV	Report
30 June 2019	Championship	19	Widnes Vikings	H		W/D/L	Score	Try Scorers	Goal Scorers	Attendance	TV	Report
6 July 2019	Championship	20	Toulouse Olympique	A	Stade Ernest-Argeles	W/D/L	Score	Try Scorers	Goal Scorers	Attendance	TV	Report
14 July 2019	Championship	21	Swinton Lions	H		W/D/L	Score	Try Scorers	Goal Scorers	Attendance	TV	Report
20 July 2019	Championship	22	York City Knights	A	York Community Stadium	W/D/L	Score	Try Scorers	Goal Scorers	Attendance	TV	Report
4 August 2019	Championship	23	Toronto Wolfpack	H		W/D/L	Score	Try Scorers	Goal Scorers	Attendance	TV	Report
11 August 2019	Championship	24	Bradford Bulls	H	Craven Park	W/D/L	Score	Try Scorers	Goal Scorers	Attendance	TV	Report
18 August 2019	Championship	25	Dewsbury Rams	A	Crown Flatt	W/D/L	Score	Try Scorers	Goal Scorers	Attendance	TV	Report
1 September 2019	Championship	26	Sheffield Eagles	H		W/D/L	Score	Try Scorers	Goal Scorers	Attendance	TV	Report
8 September 2019	Championship	27	Rochdale Hornets	A	Spotland Stadium	W/D/L	Score	Try Scorers	Goal Scorers	Attendance	TV	Report
