= Richie Poulsen =

Australian rugby league footballer (born 1962)

Personal information
- Full name: Richie Dudley Poulsen
- Born: 27 October 1962 (age 63) Casino, New South Wales, Australia

Playing information
- Position: Prop
Club
Years	Team	Pld	T	G	FG	P
1985–88	Manly Warringah	44	2	0	0	8
1989	Gold Coast	5	0	0	0	0
	Total	49	2	0	0	8
Representative
Years	Team	Pld	T	G	FG	P
1983	Queensland	2	1	0	0	4

Richie Dudley Poulsen (born 27 October 1962) is an Australian former rugby league footballer.

Originally from Casino, New South Wales, Poulsen was a front rower and left for the Redcliffe Dolphins at the age of 18 to play under Arthur Beetson. He toured Papua New Guinea with Queensland in 1983 and was a member of the Brisbane representative team which won the 1984 National Panasonic Cup.

Poulsen joined Manly Warringah in 1985 and was a regular first grade player for his first two seasons. He featured in Manly's 1988 reserves premiership–winning team. In 1989, Poulsen moved onto the Gold Coast Giants, but suffered an achilles injury towards the end of the season which ended his NSWRL career.
