= James Segeyaro =

PNG international rugby league footballer (born 1990)

James "Chicko" Segeyaro
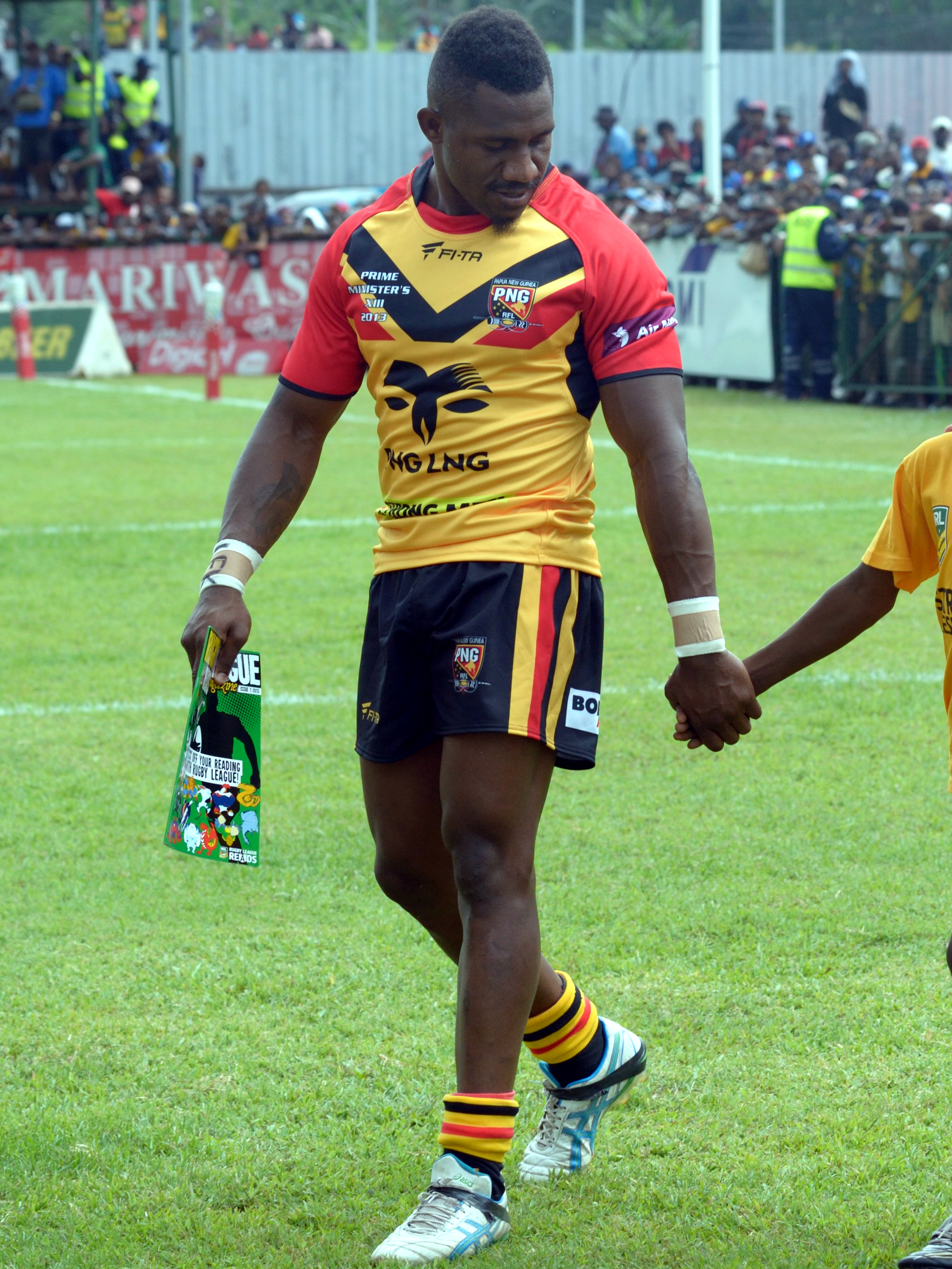

Personal information
- Full name: James Segeyaro
- Born: 11 November 1990 (age 36) Goroka, Papua New Guinea
- Height: 170 cm (5 ft 7 in)
- Weight: 86 kg (13 st 8 lb)

Playing information
- Position: Hooker
Club
Years	Team	Pld	T	G	FG	P
2011–12	North Qld Cowboys	33	8	0	0	32
2013–16	Penrith Panthers	70	26	0	0	104
2016	Leeds Rhinos	10	6	0	0	24
2017–18	Cronulla Sharks	38	2	0	0	8
2019	Brisbane Broncos	13	1	0	0	4
2022	Manly Sea Eagles	1	0	0	0	0
2022–23	FC Lézignan	11	3	0	0	12
2023	Bradford Bulls	7	1	0	0	4
2024–	Western Suburbs Red Devils
	Total	183	47	0	0	188
Representative
Years	Team	Pld	T	G	FG	P
2011	PNG Prime Minister's XIII	1	0	0	0	0
2015	Prime Minister's XIII	1	0	0	0	0
2017–19	Papua New Guinea	6	1	0	0	4
- Source: As of 9 July 2023
- Father: Ifiso Segeyaro

James Segeyaro (born 11 November 1990), also known by the nickname of "Chicko" is a former Papua New Guinea international rugby league footballer who plays as a hooker for the Western Suburbs Red Devils in the Illawarra Rugby League.

He previously played for the Brisbane Broncos, North Queensland Cowboys, Penrith Panthers, Manly Sea Eagles and the Cronulla-Sutherland Sharks in the National Rugby League, and briefly for the Blacktown Workers and Newtown Jets in the NSW Cup. Segeyaro also played for the Leeds Rhinos in the Super League. He has played for the PNG Prime Minister's XIII and the Prime Minister's XIII, against Papua New Guinea. He also played for Papua New Guinea at international level.

== Early years ==
Born in Papua New Guinea, Segeyaro moved to Cairns, Queensland, Australia with his biological mother at the age of seven. He was adopted by his best friend's parents soon after.

== Playing career ==
After playing junior football for the Cairns Ivanhoes club, Segeyaro moved to the South Sydney Rabbitohs in 2007. After being cut from the Souths' roster due to disciplinary issues, he returned to North Queensland to play for the Cowboys. Segeyaro was captain of the Cowboys' Toyota Cup team in 2010 and played for the Northern Pride in the Queensland Cup. Segeyaro was selected in the Junior Kangaroos at the end of the 2010 season.

=== 2011 ===
Segeyaro broke into the North Queensland NRL squad in 2011 after undergoing a shoulder reconstruction at the end of the previous season. Segeyaro made his NRL debut in Round 3 against the Melbourne Storm playing off the interchange bench in North Queensland's 34–6 win at 1300SMILES Stadium. In Round 15 against the New Zealand Warriors, Segeyaro scored his first NRL career try in North Queensland's 30–10 win at 1300SMILES Stadium. Segeyaro made his first start at hooker in North Queensland's 42-8 Qualifying Finals defeat by Manly-Warringah at SFS. Segeyaro went on to appear in 19 matches and score five tries for the North Queensland Cowboys the 2012 NRL season. At the end of the season he made his debut for the Papua New Guinea's Prime Minister's XIII in a 36–22 defeat by the Australian Prime Minister's XIII.

=== 2012 ===
On 15 June 2012, Segeyaro announced that he would join the Penrith Panthers on a three-year deal from 2013 to till the end of 2016. In Round 13 against the Gold Coast Titans, Segeyaro suffered an ankle syndesmosis injury in North Queensland's 28–12 loss at Cbus Super Stadium ruling him out until Round 26 in the Cowboys 36–22 victory over Cronulla-Sutherland at Remondis Stadium. Segayaro played in the Cowboys Week 1 and 2 finals matches. Segeyaro played in 14 matches and scored three tries for the North Queensland outfit in the 2012 NRL season.

=== 2013 ===
Segeyaro made his Penrith Panthers club debut in Round 1 against the Canberra Raiders playing off the interchange bench, scoring a try in Penrith's 32–10 win at Penrith Stadium. In Round 24 against the Brisbane Broncos, Segeyaro scored a hat trick in Penrith's 28–12 win at Penrith Stadium. Segeyaro played in all the Panthers 24 matches and scored 10 tries in a stellar debut year for the Penrith club in the 2013 NRL season. Injury prevented Segeyaro from representing Papua New Guinea in the 2013 World Cup.

=== 2014 ===
On 22 August 2014, Segeyaro lost his biological father Iffysoe Segeyaro, who represented the Kumuls, after he died suffering an aneurysm, with Segeyaro missing Penrith's match against the Melbourne Storm at Penrith Stadium and travelling to Papua New Guinea. The Panthers wore black armbands and held a minute silence in honour of Segeyaro's father. The Panthers lost the match 24–10. Segeyaro returned for the Panthers in Round 26 against the New Zealand Warriors, scoring a try in Penrith's 22–6 win at Penrith Stadium. Segeyaro finished off the Penrith Panthers 2014 NRL season with him playing in 25 matches and scoring 10 tries. On 29 September 2014, at the 2014 Dally M Awards, Segeyaro was named 2014 Dally M Hooker of the Year.

=== 2015 ===
Segeyaro finished off the 2015 season having played in 18 matches and scoring 6 tries for the Penrith side. On 26 September, he was called up by club coach and 2015 Prime Minister's XIII coach Ivan Cleary to play against the PNG PM's XIII. He explained that he changed his allegiance to Australia due to perceived disrespect from PNG rugby league officials after his father's death. During the match, he received boos whenever he touched the ball.

=== 2016 ===
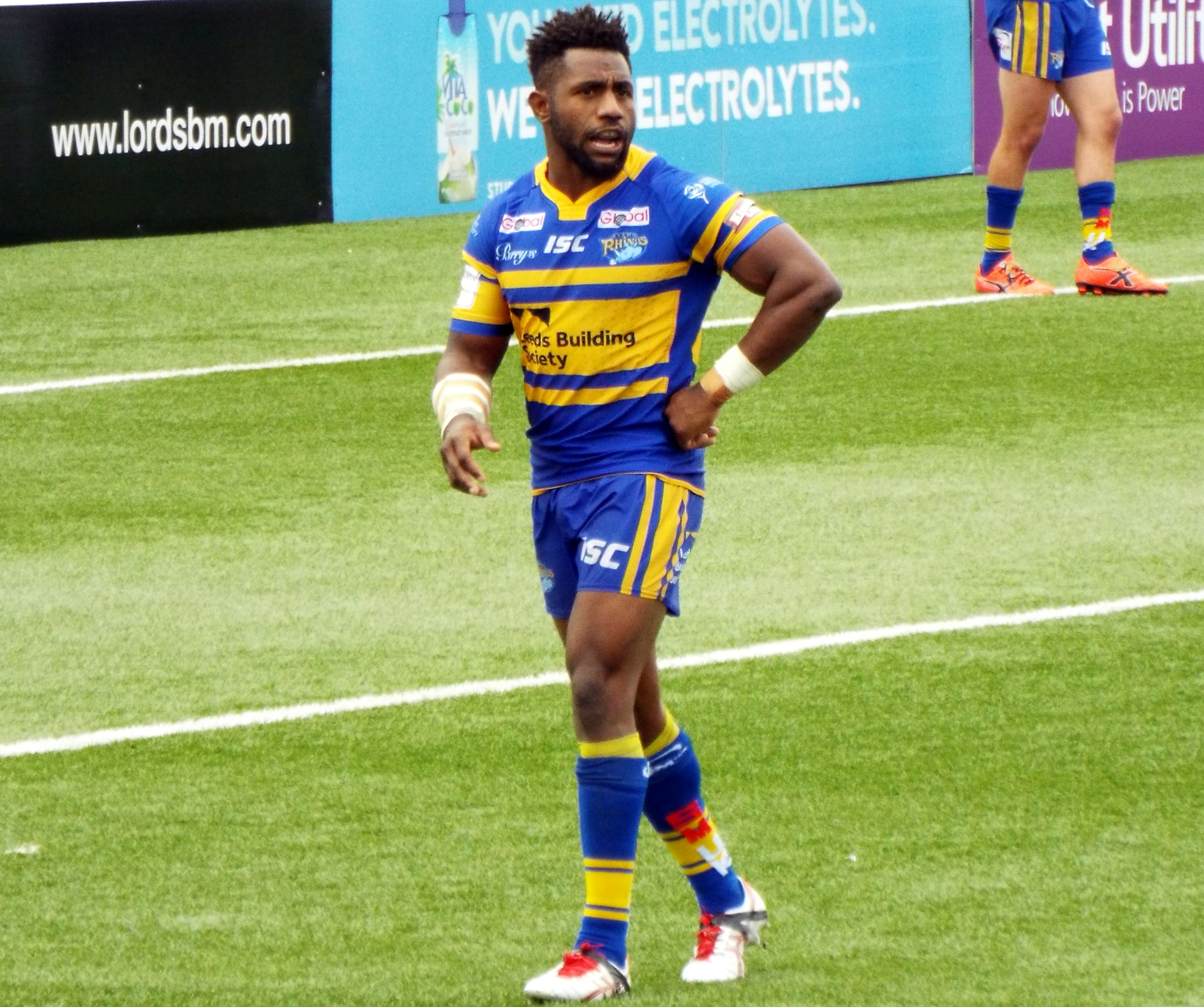
Segeyaro playing for Leeds in 2016

On Australia Day, Segeyaro received Australian citizenship from Governor-General Peter Cosgrove, having lived in the country for the past 19 years.

On 22 February 2016, Segeyaro was named as the captain of the Panthers 2016 NRL Auckland Nines squad. In Round 1 against the Canberra Raiders, Segeyaro played his 100th NRL career match but unfortunately broke his arm during Penrith's 30–22 loss at Canberra Stadium.

After a string of injuries and loss of form, Segeyaro was falling out of favour with Penrith Coach Anthony Griffin and was languishing in Penrith's NSW Cup team.

In May 2016, Segeyaro was photographed dining with senior bikie Paulie Younan alongside then Parramatta player Corey Norman. NRL CEO Todd Greenberg called the image a “bad look for the game”.

With his future at Penrith fading away, on 23 June 2016, Segeyaro signed an immediate two-year deal with the Leeds Rhinos, with the Leeds club trading fullback Zak Hardaker to the Panthers. Segeyaro finished the 2016 NRL season with him playing in four matches for the Panthers.

Segeyaro made a mid-season move to the Leeds Rhinos in a swap for Zak Hardaker that would see him play for Leeds for the rest of the season.

He signed a two-year deal with the Super League club but in December 2016 returned to Australia and announced that due to homesickness he had no intention of returning to England. The Leeds club alleged a breach of contract and were considering legal means.

=== 2017 ===
In March 2017, Leeds agreed a settlement that allowed Segeyaro to join NRL side Cronulla with immediate effect. Segeyaro made himself available for the Kumuls ahead of the 2017 World Cup. He made his Test debut against Wales on 28 October, becoming Kumul #282.

=== 2018 ===
In 2018, Segeyaro made 26 appearances for Cronulla as the club finished fourth at the end of the season and qualified for the finals. Cronulla made it to the preliminary final against Melbourne which they lost 22-6 falling short of a grand final appearance. Segeyaro featured in all three finals matches for the team.

=== 2019 ===
Segeyaro began the 2019 season in the Canterbury Cup NSW playing for Newtown. On 9 May, Segeyaro signed with the Brisbane Broncos as Cronulla released him due to salary cap constraints. Segeyaro made his debut for Brisbane in Round 10 scoring a try in a 15–10 victory over defending premiers the Sydney Roosters at Suncorp Stadium.

On 27 May, Segeyaro was caught drink driving and blew a blood-alcohol level under 0.05, but as the player is on a provisional licence his reading cannot be above zero. The Brisbane club then released a statement saying “The Brisbane Broncos can confirm that James Segeyaro has been issued with a notice to appear for driving under the influence of alcohol, Segeyaro recorded a breath test reading well under 0.05 in Brisbane this morning, but due to the fact he is on a Provisional Licence he has been issued with a notice to appear. The NRL Integrity Unit has been informed and the club is working through the issue in conjunction with them". He was suspended for one game due to this.

Segeyaro played his 150th NRL game with Brisbane in round 22 which the club won against the Penrith Panthers at Suncorp Stadium. Segeyaro made 13 appearances for Brisbane in the 2019 NRL season as the club finished eighth on the table and qualified for the finals. Segeyaro played in the club's elimination final against Parramatta which Brisbane lost 58–0 at the new Western Sydney Stadium. The defeat was the worst in Brisbane's history and also the biggest finals defeat in history.

On 1 October, Segeyaro was named for Papua New Guinea for the 2019 Rugby League World Cup 9s. On 3 October, Segeyaro was provisionally suspended by the NRL after returning a positive sample for the banned drug di-hydroxy LGD-4033 which is prohibited by the World Anti-Doping Agency (WADA) and the NRL's Anti-Doping Policy.

=== 2021 ===
On 25 January, Segeyaro and NRL player Corey Norman were involved in a street brawl at Cronulla. It was alleged during the scuffle that a knife was produced. The matter was referred to the NRL Integrity Unit.

On 18 February, Segeyaro was given a backdated 20-month suspension by the NRL Anti-Doping Tribunal. Due to time already served, Segeyaro was told he could be eligible for registration as a player on 2 June.

=== 2022 ===
On 7 February, it was revealed that Segeyaro had signed a one-year deal with NSW Cup side Blacktown Workers, feeder to the Manly-Warringah Sea Eagles. On 28 July, Segeyaro made his club debut for Manly against the Sydney Roosters off the bench where he played eleven minutes.

=== 2023 ===
On 3 June, Segeyaro signed a contract to join RFL Championship side Bradford until the end of the season.

== Personal life ==
Segeyaro owns a clothing business called "YKTR" alongside former Dragons player Corey Norman and ex-player Isaac John. He also has a passion for food and has created his own brand called "Help Ya Self".
