= Dave Clark (rugby league) =

Wales international rugby league footballer and coach

Personal information
- Full name: David Clark
- Born: 6 April 1971 (age 55) Cardiff, Wales

Playing information
- Position: Hooker
Club
Years	Team	Pld	T	G	FG	P
1997	Gold Coast Chargers	4	1	0	0	4
1999–2006	Barrow Raiders	136	36	0	0	144
	Total	140	37	0	0	148
Representative
Years	Team	Pld	T	G	FG	P
2004	Wales	2	0	0	0	0

Coaching information
Club
Years	Team	Gms	W	D	L	W%
2008	Barrow Raiders	32	21	0	11	66
2009	Barrow Raiders	25	17	0	8	68
2011	Barrow Raiders	6	3	0	3	50
2012–13	South Wales Scorpions	45	12	1	32	27
2017	Workington Town	25	10	1	14	40
	Total	133	63	2	68	47

David Clark (born 6 April 1971) is a former professional rugby league footballer and coach who played as a hooker in the 1990s and 2000s. He played at representative level for Wales, and at club level for Gold Coast Chargers and Barrow Raiders.

== Playing career ==
Born in Cardiff, Clark moved to Australia at a young age. He signed for Barrow Raiders in 1999 from Gold Coast Chargers, and went on to make 136 appearances for the club.

== International honours ==
Clark won caps for Wales while at Barrow Raiders in 2004.
