= 2017 League 1 Cup =

- Duration: 4 Rounds
- Number of teams: 16
- Winners: Barrow Raiders
- Runners-up: North Wales Crusaders
- Biggest home win: 68–14 Barrow Raiders v Oxford (semi-final)
- Biggest away win: 12–48 Hemel Stags v Gloucestershire All Golds (first round)

The 2017 League 1 Cup known as the 2017 iPro Sport cup for sponsorship reasons is the third running of the competition, first played in 2015.

The 2017 competition was won by Barrow Raiders who defeated North Wales Crusaders 38–32 in the final at Bloomfield Road, Blackpool on 27 May 2017.

The League 1 Cup competition is for the rugby league clubs in the British League 1 - the third tier of rugby league in Britain. There are 16 teams in League 1 but Canadian club Toronto Wolfpack declined to enter the tournament. As a result, amateur team and 2016 Conference Challenge Trophy winners Rochdale Mayfield were invited into the competition to bring the numbers to 16.

== Teams ==
Team	Appearance	First appearance	Last appearance
Barrow Raiders	3rd	2015	2016
Coventry Bears	3rd	2015	2016
Doncaster	2nd	2016	2016
Gloucestershire All Golds	3rd	2016	2016
Hemel Stags	3rd	2016	2016
Hunslet Hawks	2nd	2016	2016
Keighley Cougars	3rd	2015	2016
London Skolars	3rd	2015	2016
Newcastle Thunder	3rd	2015	2016
North Wales Crusaders	3rd	2015	2016
Oxford	3rd	2015	2016
Rochdale Mayfield	1st	2017	N/A
South Wales Ironmen	3rd	2015	2016
Whitehaven	1st	2017	N/A
Workington Town	1st	2017	N/A
York City Knights	3rd	2015	2016

== First round ==
The first round draw of the 2016 iPro Sport Cup was broadcast live on BBC Radio Leeds on 20 December 2016 from 6.45pm. For the first round the teams were split into two pools – Pool A (Northern regions) and Pool B (Midlands and Southern regions). Ties to be played over the weekend of 18–19 February 2017.

The draw was made by former Keighley player Paul Handforth (man of the match in 2016 final) and BBC Leeds presenter and former footballer Paul Ogden.

=== Pool A ===
Home	Score	Away	Match Information
Home	Score	Away	Date and Time	Venue	Referee	Attendance
Rochdale Mayfield	18 – 46	Barrow Raiders	18 February 2017, 14:00	Rochdale Mayfield RLFC	T. Crashley	300 (estimated)
Whitehaven	6 – 22	Workington Town	19 February 2017, 14:00	Recreation Ground	C. Straw	908
Hunslet Hawks	10 – 34	Newcastle Thunder	19 February 2017, 15:00	South Leeds Stadium	B. Robinson	449
Keighley Cougars	30 – 22	Doncaster	19 February 2017, 15:00	Cougar Park	J. McMullen	520
York City Knights	16 – 17 (Note: After golden point overtime)	North Wales Crusaders	19 February 2017, 15:00	Bootham Crescent	N. Bennett	620

=== Pool B ===
Home	Score	Away	Match Information
Home	Score	Away	Date and Time	Venue	Referee	Attendance
Oxford Rugby League	30 – 28	Coventry Bears	18 February 2017, 14:00	Tilsley Park	G. Dolan	121
Hemel Stags	12 – 48	Gloucestershire All Golds	19 February 2017, 14:00	Pennine Way Stadium	M. Rossleigh	107
South Wales Ironmen	16 – 24	London Skolars	19 February 2017, 15:00	The Wern	L. Moore	122

== Quarter finals ==
The draw was made immediately after the conclusion of the first round matches.

Home	Score	Away	Match Information
Home	Score	Away	Date and Time	Venue	Referee	Attendance
Gloucestershire All Golds	30 – 22	Workington Town	1 April 2017, 14:30	Derwent Park (Note: Gloucestershire forfeited home advantage due to the unavailability of their home ground)	M. Rossleigh	378
Oxford Rugby League	24 – 20	London Skolars	1 April 2017, 14:30	Tilsley Park	A. Sweet	105
Barrow Raiders	28 – 6	Keighley Cougars	2 April 2017, 14:00	Craven Park	N. Bennett	828
Newcastle Thunder	16 – 24	North Wales Crusaders	2 April 2017, 15:00	Kingston Park	J. McMullen	345

== Semi finals ==
The draw for the semi-finals was made on 3 April 2017. Making the draw were England assistant coach Paul Anderson and BBC rugby league correspondent Dave Woods.

Home	Score	Away	Match Information
Home	Score	Away	Date and Time	Venue	Referee	Attendance
Gloucestershire All Golds	28 – 37	North Wales Crusaders	30 April 2017, 15:00	Prince of Wales Stadium	J Roberts	202
Barrow Raiders	64 – 14	Oxford	30 April 2017, 15:00	Craven Park	L Moore	962

== Final ==
The final between Barrow Raiders and North Wales Crusaders was played on 27 May at Bloomfield Road, Blackpool as the curtain raiser to the 2017 Summer Bash.

Home	Score	Away	Match Information
Home	Score	Away	Date and Time	Venue	Referee	Attendance
Barrow Raiders	38 – 32	North Wales Crusaders	27 May 2017, 12:00	Bloomfield Road	S Race	not given (Note: Aggregate attendance for the four games played that day at Bloomfield Road was 11,557)
