= Barrow Raiders =

English rugby league club

Club information
- Full name: Barrow Rugby League Football Club Ltd
- Nickname: Raiders
- Colours: Blue and white
- Founded: 1875; 151 years ago
- Website: barrowrlfc.com

Current details
- Ground: Craven Park (4,000)
- Chairman: Steve Neale
- Coach: Paul Crarey
- Captain: Ryan Johnston
- Competition: Championship
- 2026 season: 6th (Sudden Death)
- Current season

Uniforms
Home colours

Records
- Challenge Cups: 1 (1954–55)
- Second Division: 3 (1975–76, 1983–84, 2009)
- Highest points scorer: 2,403 – Darren Holt

The Barrow Raiders are a semi-professional rugby league team in Barrow-in-Furness, Cumbria, England. The club play home games at Craven Park and compete in the Championship, the second tier of British rugby league.

Barrow have never won the League Championship, their only major honour being winning the Challenge Cup in 1955.

Traditionally the club's home colours are blue and white and main rivals are fellow semi-professional Cumbrian teams Whitehaven and Workington Town.

== History ==
=== Early years ===
A Barrow side met the 1921 Kangaroos in a tour match

Barrow Football Club was formed in 1875 and played its first home game on 4 December of that year against the Royal Grammar School, Lancaster, at Cavendish Park on Barrow Island, then home to the town's cricket club. It is thought that Tom H. Baynes, a shipping clerk, was the driving force behind the club's foundation. As well as being a player, he was probably also the first Barrow team coach. Early practice matches games were played in "a field loaned by a local farmer" as well as the Parade Ground and the aforementioned Cavendish Park.

At the 1883 annual general meeting, Cavendish Park got the vote over the Parade Ground as a permanent home on account of its better playing surface. The first grandstand there was erected in 1893, and another one in 1893.

In April 1897, the team switched from rugby union to rugby league following a unanimous vote at the club. Barrow joined the Second Division of the Lancashire Senior Competition and became champions in their first season. They lost a test match against Morecambe, the bottom club in the First Division, however, and failed to gain promotion. They were eventually promoted at the end of the 1899–1900 season, by defeating Tyldesley in the test match.

In 1908, the club nearly doubled their attendance record to 12,000 in a third round Challenge Cup match against Hunslet.

In 1914, Cavendish Park was requisitioned by the authorities for the war effort. Barrow moved to Little Park, Roose, three miles from the centre of town. The first match there was a 31–2 victory over Bramley. The league at this time was suspended and clubs were forced to arrange their own fixtures in an unofficial war league. Boosted by an influx of players and spectators into the local shipyards for war production, Barrow became one of the dominant teams of the war period, winning the unofficial championship title in 1917–18 losing just twice in 22 matches.

=== Interwar Period and move to Craven Park ===
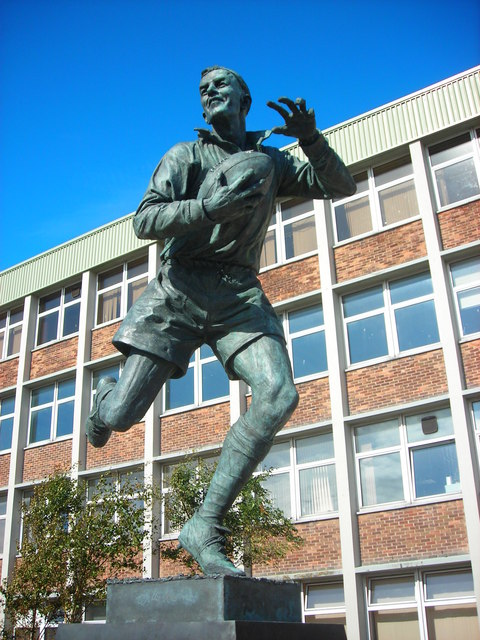
Willie Horne started his career at Barrow

After World War I, Barrow had mixed fortunes and when the league resumed in 1919–20, they managed to finish fifth. However, over the next decade, despite having several county and national players, Barrow's form suffered and its league position was poor.

In 1929, it had been realised that rugby league in Barrow was approaching a precarious period, as the attendances at Little Park were gradually decreasing. This was in part due to industrial depression but also Little Park's location. The directors made an appeal to the town, and approached the mayor, Alderman John Whinnerah who was to be an ardent supporter. Commander G. W. Craven, a local war hero, started an appeal fund with a donation of £500. In a short time the club bought a central site, where the Jute Works stood for £2,500. Craven Park was built in 1931, largely as a result of the efforts of supporters, 500 of whom volunteered to construct the ground. The total cost of the building project came to £7,500 (based on increases in average earnings, this would be approximately £1,251,000 in 2013).

1937–38 saw Barrow reach the finals of the Lancashire County Cup for the first time, losing narrowly 4–8 to Warrington. That season was a time of great opportunity for the Barrow team but was to end in disappointment. After playing seven matches in just ten days, they lost 7–4 to Salford in the final of the Challenge Cup at Wembley; they also lost in the Championship play-off semi-final 13–7 against Hunslet. A new attendance record was set in that season – 21,651 in the Good Friday game against Salford. The Club had traditionally worn black and red, but for much of the 1937–38 cup campaigns they wore an alternative kit of blue and white which subsequently become the home colours of the club.

=== Post Second World War ===
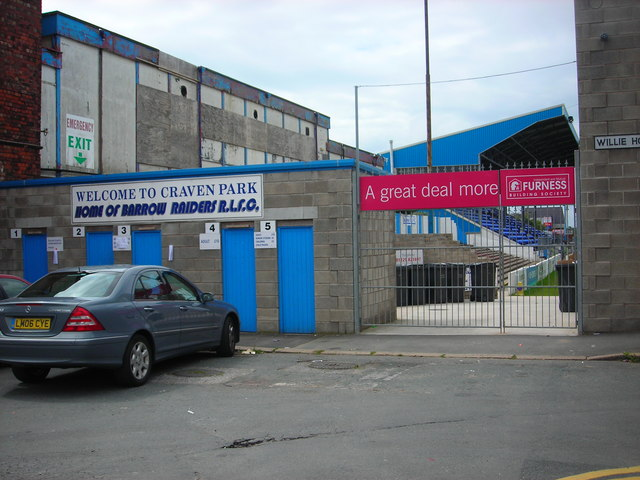
Craven Park, the current home of Barrow Raiders

Barrow dropped out of the wartime Lancashire league in 1940–41, they did not return to league competition until 1945–46. As many of the pre-war players had retired, this was an era of rebuilding and recruiting.

The 1950s were the club's heyday. The team was captained by Willie Horne and Barrow appeared no less than three times at Wembley. On 5 May 1951, Barrow made their second appearance at Wembley and were beaten 10–0 by Wigan. On Saturday 27 October 1951 13,319 spectators were at Barrow to watch the home side beat New Zealand 9–5. On 30 April 1955, Barrow made their third appearance at Wembley. This time, they won the Challenge Cup 21–12 against Workington Town, later that year they added the Lancashire Cup after a 12–2 win over Oldham.

On 11 May 1957, Barrow played again in the Challenge Cup final at Wembley against Leeds and were narrowly beaten 9–7. 1957 signalled the end of the golden era of the club and most of the star players retired after this time.

The league split into two divisions in 1961–62 and because of a poor finish in the previous season, Barrow was forced to play in the second division.

In 1963, Jim Challinor moved to Barrow and became their player-coach.

Their last appearance at Wembley Stadium was in 1967, where they were strongly tipped to win the Challenge Cup final again, but were beaten by Featherstone Rovers 17–12. A crowd of 77,000 paid a then record £54,435 to watch the game (based on increases in average earnings, this would be approximately £1,625,000 in 2013).

1973 saw Barrow appoint former player, Frank Foster, as coach. He built a side which won the Second Division championship in 1975–76 and reached a John Player Trophy final in 1981 only to lose 5–12 to Warrington. Phil Hogan was transferred to Hull Kingston Rovers in 1978 for a then world record fee of £33,000 (based on increases in average increases, this would be approximately £249,700 in 2013).

Barrow fluctuated between divisions but had three consecutive years in the top flight between 1980 and 1983. Frank Foster was eventually replaced by Tommy Dawes in 1983.

The season 1983–84 saw Barrow win the Second Division title and the Lancashire Cup against favourites Widnes 12–8. The entire Barrow team was inducted into the Barrow Hall of Fame in 2003. Tommy Dawes, despite his initial success, was sacked in 1985.

In 1988–89, Australian Rod Reddy took on a player-coach role at Barrow in 1987. Barrow earned promotion to Division One but that campaign saw Barrow manage only one league win and suffer a club record 90–0 defeat at Leeds. Reddy was sacked and Denis Jackson took over as a caretaker coach for the rest of 1989–90.

After relegation in 1990, Barrow appointed a new coach in Steve Norton but finished 17th out of 21 in Division Two.

=== Summer era ===
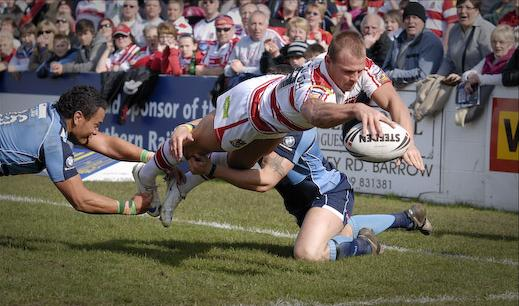
Barrow Raiders player, Zeb Luisi attempting to tackle Shaun Ainscough of Wigan

In 1996, the first tier of British rugby league clubs played the inaugural Super League season and changed from a winter to a summer season. When the Super League competition had been proposed, part of the deal was that some traditional clubs would merge. Barrow were down to merge with Whitehaven, Workington Town and Carlisle to form a new club called Cumbria based in Workington which would compete in the Super League but ultimately this did not happen and Barrow were not part of the new competition.

Until 1995 the team was simply titled Barrow RLFC, but they adopted the nickname Barrow Braves to coincide with rugby league's switch to a summer season. Peter Roe was head coach for a 15-month period, ending in January 1996.

=== Barrow Border Raiders (1997–2002) ===
In 1997 they merged with Cumbrian rivals Carlisle to form Barrow Border Raiders. Carlisle's Paul Charlton became coach of the new team. The new team played all its matches in Barrow; the merger was essentially a financial arrangement only. Barrow enjoyed mixed fortunes under Paul Charlton with two top-ten finishes in the Northern Ford Premiership in 1999 and 2000, before the club's fortunes took a turn for the worse in the 2001 season, which resulted in Paul Charlton not being offered a new contract. In 2002, the Border part of the name, which was never particularly relevant to South Cumbria-based Barrow, was dropped.

=== Barrow Raiders (2002–2010) ===
Under Peter Roe's second spell at Craven Park, they were National League Two champions in 2004, their first trophy for 20 years. They were promoted to National League One. However, they were relegated back to National League Two at the end of the 2005 season after winning just one of their 18 matches. The financial situation at the club forced a review of the coaching structure and the position of head coach was made part-time and the club parted company with Peter Roe. In October 2005, local ex-player Paul Crarey was appointed as head coach. In his first season as coach of the Raiders he guided them to the National League Two play-offs on a very limited budget. After the end of the 2007 season, Paul Crarey controversially resigned from Barrow Raiders, after guiding them to a second successive play-off position.

Barrow had initially lined up former Widnes coach Steve McCormack to take over until he received an offer of a position with Super League club Hull KR. On Thursday 2 November 2007 Barrow Raiders announced that former player Welsh-born Aussie Dave Clarke would take over, with Dean Marwood as his assistant. On 23 August 2008, Raiders gained automatic promotion from National League Two by beating Swinton 12–32 to clinch second place in National League Two.

On 5 April 2009, a crowd of 6275 watched Barrow play Super League club Wigan in the best attended match in recent years. Barrow held out but were eventually defeated 32–20. On 21 July, despite the club being second in the league and having made the Northern Rail Cup Final, coach Dave Clarke stepped down and became assistant to new head coach Steve Deakin.

On 31 August 2009, after just six weeks in charge, Steve Deakin left the club and Dave Clarke reclaimed the head coach role, leading the club to the 2009 Co-Op Championship league leaders trophy and a grand final appearance versus Halifax. In the 2009 Co-Op Championship Grand Final, a 77th minute try settled the game and Barrow beat Halifax 26–18 to claim the Championship title..

Barrow finished fourth in 2010 with coach Steve McCormack leaving the club to take up a teaching post. After a lengthy search for a new coach, Barrow appointed Garry Schofield.

=== 2011 season and relegation to Championship 1 ===
Barrow's application to join the then franchised Super League, after their Championship Grand Final win in 2009, was rejected early in the 2011 season as it was deemed the club did not the meet minimum requirements.

Head Coach Schofield was sacked as coach after only five games in 2011 and his assistant Nigel Wright was appointed in his place. With 6 games to go in July Barrow sacked Nigel Wright and appointed former player Dave Clarke as their manager for the rest of the season.

==== Rule breaches and RFL charges ====
The on-field problems were matched by off-field difficulties, with the club accused of breaking salary cap rules. A 6-point deduction due to salary cap breaches in the 2010 season, ended any play off hope. At a tribunal in October 2011, claims that the club "systematically breached" the following three rules were upheld.

- Rule C.1.1.7 – failing to record in player contracts all financial benefits or benefits in kind that a player is receiving;
- Rule C.1.1.11 – no club or club official shall loan money or goods or make payment or provide any benefit in kind to a player unless they are recorded in the player's contract;
- Rule D1.8 (f) – misconduct by committing a breach of Championship Salary Cap Regulations.

Their chairman, Des Johnston was banned from any involvement with Rugby League for 8 years and 29 points were deducted for the 2011 season, relegating them to the Co-operative Championship 1.

=== 2012–2017 ===
Success in Championship 1 during 2012 meant that Barrow were promoted directly back up to the Championship the following year. Unable to compete, and after narrowly avoiding relegation in 2013, they were once again relegated at the end of the 2014 season.

At the end of the 2014 season Paul Crarey was re-appointed head coach, replacing Bobbie Goulding. The former player had previously coached the team between 2005 and 2007.

The team strengthened on the field during three consecutive seasons in, the now renamed League 1 with improving table finishes (2015: 7th) (2016: 5th) (2017: 3rd)

On 27 May 2017, Barrow won the League 1 Cup after defeating North Wales Crusaders 38–32 at Bloomfield Road as an opener to the Summer Bash weekend. At the end of the 2017 season, Barrow secured promotion back to the Championship with a 10–6 play-off win against 2nd place Cumbrian rivals Whitehaven.

=== Return to the Championship (2018–2019) ===
Barrow achieved a better than expected start to the 2018 season with strong results on the field including holding League favourites Toronto to a draw. However, the club faced significant financial issues. For the second time in just over 5 years, chairman David Sharpe announced significant short term cash flow issues. Steve Neale replaced Sharpe as chairman stating that there was a "bright future for the club" after raising short term funds. Barrow finished their inaugural Championship season in 10th place avoiding risk of relegation.

The following season, Barrow were once again relegated to the RFL League 1 after a 68–2 defeat against Toronto Wolfpack on 1 September 2019.

=== Back in League 1 (2020–2021) ===
After relegation from the Championship in 2019, Barrow started their return to life in League 1 with a 32–22 victory over Doncaster on 1 March 2020.

On 16 March the structure and timing of the competition was placed in doubt as all rugby league games were suspended until 3 April at least as part of the United Kingdom's response to the coronavirus pandemic. The suspension of the season was extended to indefinite.

A discussion between the RFL and club officials in May saw seven of the 11 clubs reject a suggestion that the season could recommence with games being played behind closed doors. The RFL board met on 20 July and having consulted with the League 1 clubs decided to abandon the 2020 season as the majority of clubs did not support playing behind closed doors. At the date of suspension only two rounds of matches had been played and the season was declared null and void.

=== Championship return (2021–) ===
In the 2025 season, the club celebrated its 150th anniversary with a home kit inspired by the 1875 Barrow team

In a 2021 RFL League 1 season marked by controversy, Barrow finished top of the table and earned promotion back to the Championship.

The first dispute arose on 29 July, when Barrow were accused of falsely reporting COVID-19 cases and close contacts to avoid a match against fellow promotion contenders Workington Town. The allegation came while Barrow’s squad was already depleted by injuries. Further questions followed the final match of the season, when Barrow offered local amateur rugby players to West Wales Raiders so the fixture could go ahead. Barrow won 76–0, prompting some to question the fairness of the match and, in turn, the legitimacy of their League 1 title.

In the 2022 RFL Championship season, Barrow finished 4th in the table and qualified for the playoffs. The club were eliminated in the first week of the playoffs by Batley.

== Grounds ==
=== Previous grounds (1875–1931) ===
Barrow played their first match in 1875 at Cavendish Park on Barrow Island, the then home of Barrow Cricket Club. The park had two suitable playing areas and until 1883 the new club used the Parade Ground, but then moved to the Athletic Ground as it had a better playing surface for rugby. A first grandstand was built in 1887 for the princely sum of less than £50 to the landlords, The Furness Railway Company. Another grandstand on the opposite side was finished in 1893. On 28 March 1908 a crowd of 12,000 crammed into the ground for a Challenge Cup tie against Hunslet. In 1914 the club decided to move away to Little Park in nearby Roose. In 1920, the club bought Little Park from Lord Richard Cavendish for £3,000 and in the following years put up two grandstands in 1921 and 1924. A record crowd of 12,214 was recorded against Oldham RLFC in a Challenge Cup game on 17 March 1923. Cavendish Park and the Parade Ground is now home to a fire station while the Athletic Ground is still used as community playing fields. Little Park was developed for housing.

=== Craven Park (1931–present day) ===
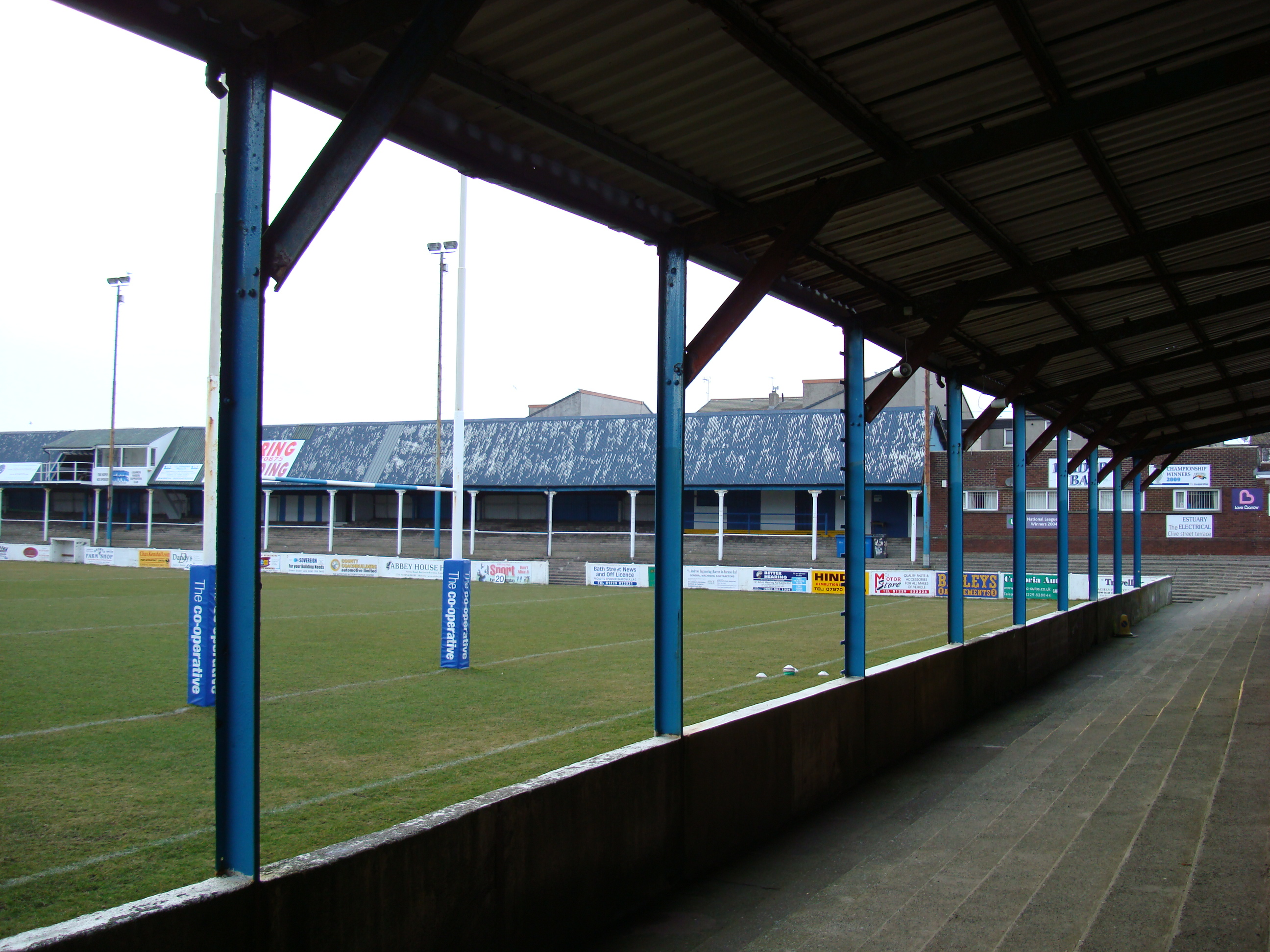
View of Craven Park prior to removal of NE terrace roof

In 1928, the club's committee started to look for a site nearer to the town and found an area on Craven Park. After tipping more than 40,000 tons of fill onto the site previously a derelict Jute Works, reservoirs, railway tracks and mission hall the club moved their main stand from Little Park and built a new stand on Clive Street and officially moved in, in August 1931.

On 15 April 1938, the club's record attendance was established when 21,651 saw them play Salford. In February 1949, storms ripped the entire roof off the main stand and in the early 1950s concrete terracing replaced the old wooden railway sleepers. Floodlights were turned on in November 1966. The ground was renovated in 1991.

In 2015, the roof was removed from the terrace adjacent to Willie Horne Way. This was followed in 2021 with the removal of the condemned Hindpool Road end roof, leaving only two areas of cover in the ground. Plans were also unveiled for a marquee on the terrace next to the main stand.

== 2027 squad ==
Barrow Raiders 2027 Squad
First team squad			Coaching staff
(England) Alex Bishop – SO, HK, SH; (England) Luke Broadbent – WG, CE, FB; (England) Joe Bullock – PR; (England) Matty Costello – SR, CE; (England) Luke Creswell (vc) – FB; (England) Fin Dutton – HK; (Scotland) Charlie Emslie – SR; (England) Ryan Johnston (c) – SH, SO	(Italy) Ryan King – LF, SR, PR; (England) Dan Knott – WG; (England) Greg Richards – PR; (Thailand) Tee Ritson – WG; (England) Ellis Robson – SR, PR, LF; (England) Trent Ruddy – HK; (England) Curtis Teare – CE, WG	(Scotland) Shane Toal – CE, WG; (England) Brad Walker – SO, LF; (England) Tom Walker – PR; (England) Stevie Watson – PR; (England) Josh Wood – HK, SH, SO; (England) Seth Woodend – CE	Head coach: Paul Crarey; Assistant coach: Steve Rea; Legend: (c) Captain(s); (vc) Vice-captain(s); Updated: Source(s): https://www.barrowrlfc.com/squad/barrow-raiders-2026-squad/

== 2027 transfers ==
=== Gains ===
Player	From	Contract	Date

=== Losses ===
Player	To	Contract	Date
(England) Andrew Bulman	Whitehaven	2 years	19 September 2026
(England) Ellis Archer			18 November 2026

=== Retired ===
Player	Date
(Ireland) Brad Singleton	28 July 2026

== Players ==
=== Hall of Fame ===
The Barrow club launched its Hall of Fame in 2001 with 1950s legends Willie Horne, Phil Jackson and Jimmy Lewthwaite its inaugural inductees.

== Past coaches ==
Also see Category:Barrow Raiders coaches.

- Hector Halsall 1932-50
- Cec Thompson 1960–62
- Frank Foster 1973–83
- Tommy Dawes 1983–85
- Tommy Bishop 1985
- Ivor Kelland 1986–87
- Dennis Jackson 1987
- Rod Reddy 1988–89
- Dennis Jackson 1989–90
- Steve Norton 1990–93
- Geoff Worrall 1993
- Peter Roe 1994–96
- Steve Hogan 1996
- Peter Roe 2004–05
- Paul Crarey 2006–07
- Dave Clarke 2008
- Steve Deakin 2009
- Dave Clarke 2009
- Steve McCormack 2010
- Garry Schofield 2011
- Nigel Wright 2011
- Dave Clarke 2011
- Darren Holt 2011–13
- Anthony Murray 2013–14
- Bobbie Goulding 2014
- Paul Crarey 2014–present

== Seasons ==
=== Super League era ===
Season	League									Play-offs	Challenge Cup	Other competitions		Name	Tries	Name	Points
Season	Division	P	W	D	L	F	A	Pts	Pos	Play-offs	Challenge Cup	Other competitions		Top try scorer		Top point scorer	
1996	Division Two	22	5	0	17	354	651	10	10th		R4						
1997	Division Two	20	7	0	13	335	632	14	8th		R4						
1998	Division Two	20	8	2	10	354	377	18	6th		R4						
1999	Northern Ford Premiership	28	12	0	16	660	718	24	10th		R4						
2000	Northern Ford Premiership	28	14	0	14	647	711	28	10th		R4						
2001	Northern Ford Premiership	28	12	1	15	631	685	25	14th		R4						
2002	Northern Ford Premiership	27	12	1	14	707	670	25	13th		R4						
2003	National League Two	18	11	0	7	546	419	22	5th	Lost in Elimination Playoffs	R4						
2004	National League Two	18	14	1	3	521	346	29	1st		R3						
2005	National League One	18	1	0	17	299	832	2	10th		R5						
2006	National League Two	22	12	0	10	599	481	24	6th	Lost in Elimination Playoffs	R5						
2007	National League Two	22	17	0	5	769	387	55	3rd		R5						
2008	National League Two	22	16	0	6	703	375	52	2nd		R5						
2009	Championship	20	13	0	7	632	261	44	1st	Won in Final	R4	Championship Cup	RU				
2010	Championship	20	12	1	7	607	449	39	4th	Lost in Semi Final	QF						
2011	Championship	20	9	0	11	527	540	0	11th		R4						
2012	Championship 1	18	14	0	4	617	383	45	2nd	Lost in Final	R4						
2013	Championship	26	8	0	18	482	792	33	12th		R4						
2014	Championship	26	4	0	22	462	870	19	14th		R4						
2015	Championship 1	22	14	8	0	661	423	28	7th		R4	League 1 Cup	R2				
2016	League 1	21	15	1	5	769	375	31	3rd	Lost in Play-off Final	R3	League 1 Cup	R1				
2017	League 1	22	18	1	3	731	381	37	2nd	Won in Promotion Final	QF	League 1 Cup	W				
2018	Championship	23	5	3	15	382	816	13	10th		R5						
2018	Championship Shield	30	8	3	19	491	1006	19	5th		R5						
2019	Championship	27	5	1	21	479	861	11	13th		R4	1895 Cup	QF				
2020	League 1	League abandoned due to the COVID-19 pandemic									R4						
2021	League 1	17	13	1	3	596	275	27	1st	N/A (Note: League leaders do not compete in playoffs)	R3 (Note: Officially round 1 due to the competitions temporary restructure in 2021.)	1895 Cup	R1				
2022	Championship	27	18	1	8	757	587	37	4th	Lost in Elimination Playoffs	R6	1895 Cup	SF				
2023	Championship	27	8	1	18	471	672	17	11th		R4						
2024	Championship	26	9	1	16	458	758	19	11th		R3	1895 Cup	QF				
2025	Championship	24	10	1	13	525	559	21	9th		R3	1895 Cup	QF				
2026	Championship	24	17	0	7	649	447	34	6th	Lost in Preliminary Semi-finals	R3	1895 Cup	PR				

== Honours ==
=== League ===
- Second Tier / Championship

Winners (3): 1975–76, 1983–84, 2009

RFL Championship Leaders' Shield
Winners (1): 2009

- Third Tier / League 1

Winners (2): 2004, 2021*

=== Cups ===
- Challenge Cup

Winners (1): 1954–55

- Lancashire County Cup

Winners (2): 1954, 1983

- League 1 Cup

Winners (1): 2017

== Club records ==
- Most tries in a game: 7 by Tee Ritson against West Wales Raiders 12 September 2021
- Most goals in a game: 17 by Darren Carter against Nottingham City 27 November 1994
- Most points in a game: 42 by Darren Carter against Nottingham City 27 November 1994
- Most tries in a season: 50 by Jimmy Lewthwaite in 1956–57
- Most goals in a season: 135 by Joe Ball in 1956–57
- Most points in a season: 323 by Jamie Rooney in 2010
- Most tries in a career: 352 by Jimmy Lewthwaite
- Most goals in a career: 1,036 by Darren Holt
- Most points in a career: 2,403 by Darren Holt

== See also ==
- Barrow Raiders Ladies
