= Dave Brown (rugby league, born 1957) =

Australia international rugby league footballer

Personal information
- Born: 5 December 1957 (age 68) Brisbane, Queensland, Australia

Playing information
- Position: Prop
Club
Years	Team	Pld	T	G	FG	P
??–1980	Souths (Brisbane)
1981–82	Eastern Suburbs	50	2	0	0	6
1983–84	Manly Sea Eagles	34	2	0	0	6
1985–86	Eastern Suburbs	13	0	0	0	0
1986–87	Hull F.C.		1	0	0	4
	Total	97	5	0	0	16
Representative
Years	Team	Pld	T	G	FG	P
1979–86	Queensland	12	1	0	0	4
1979	Brisbane Firsts	1	0	0	0	0
1983	City NSW	1	0	0	0	0
1983–84	Australia	5	0	0	0	0
- Source: As of 18 June 2013

Dave Brown (born 5 December 1957) is an Australian former professional rugby league footballer who played in the 1980s. An Australian international and Queensland State of Origin representative forward, he played his club football in the Brisbane Rugby League for the Souths Logan Magpies under the coaching of Wayne Bennett. He also played in the NSWRL for Eastern Suburbs and Manly-Warringah.

== Background ==
Brown was born in Brisbane, Queensland, Australia.

== Career ==
=== Club career ===
Dave Brown started his club career in the Brisbane Rugby League competition with the Souths Magpies.

In 1981, Brown signed with Sydney club Eastern Suburbs. Under the coaching of Bob Fulton, Brown played 41 games for the Roosters in 1981 and 1982 (and was considered unlucky not to be selected for the 1982 Kangaroo tour), before following Fulton to Manly in 1983 where he would win the 1983 Dally M Prop of the year award, though injury kept him out of the Sea Eagles Grand Final team that lost 18–6 to Parramatta. Brown stayed at Manly for the 1984 season, before once again joining Easts for what would be his last two years of top grade football in Australia.

After finishing his career with Easts at the end of the 1986 NSWRL season (after having only played 12 games over the course of 1985 and 1986), Brown ventured to England where he joined Hull F.C. in the 1986–87 season. Dave Brown played at prop in Hull FC's 24–31 defeat by Castleford in the 1986 Yorkshire Cup Final during the 1986–87 season at Headingley, Leeds on Saturday 11 October 1986. Hull finished the season in 11th place and only two places away from being relegated to the Second Division. Following the season, Brown returned home to Brisbane.

After returning to Australia, Brown played in the Western Australian Rugby League in Perth as Captain-coach of the Belmont Steelers in 1988–90.

=== Representative career ===
Dave Brown made his first representative appearance when he was selected Queensland in a 30–5 loss to New South wales in 1979. Later that year he was chosen for the Brisbane Firsts team that played in an Amco Cup game at Sydney's Leichhardt Oval in 1979 against the Cronulla-Sutherland Sharks, a game Cronulla won 22–5. Brown's teammates at Leichhardt that night included Centre pairing Mal Meninga and Chris Close, Halfback Ross Strudwick, Test Hooker John Lang, while on the interchange bench was a young Lock forward named Wally Lewis.

Brown played two State of Residence and ten State of Origin matches for Queensland between 1979 and 1986, scoring his only try for the Maroons in Game 3 of the 1983 State of Origin series at Lang Park after coming on as a replacement for Darryl Brohman who had his jaw broken after a sickening elbow from New South Wales' forward Les Boyd, a Manly teammate of Brown. Brohman had been widely tipped to make his test debut for Australia in the first Trans-Tasman Test against New Zealand at Carlaw Park in Auckland just three days later, but ironically the spot in the test team went to Brown instead. He played his last game for Queensland in Game 1 of the 1986 State of Origin series at Lang Park, but was dropped after NSW defeated Qld 22–16 in front of 33,066 fans.

His standout performances for Queensland in 1983 saw him make the first of 5 test appearances for Australia in the opening test of the 1983 Trans-Tasman series against New Zealand, and would retain his spot for the second game at Lang Park. He then went on to play in the front row in the first two games of The Ashes series against Great Britain in 1984, before being relegated to the bench for what would be his final test as Australia defeated Great Britain 20–7 in the final test at the Sydney Cricket Ground. Australia retained The Ashes with a 3–0 series win over the Lions.
