= Stan Jurd =

Australian rugby league footballer

Personal information
- Full name: Stanley Plunket Jurd
- Born: 22 November 1958 (age 68) Moree, New South Wales, Australia

Playing information
- Position: Prop
Club
Years	Team	Pld	T	G	FG	P
1981–82	North Sydney Bears	35	0	0	0	0
1983–87	Parramatta Eels	89	6	0	0	24
	Total	124	6	0	0	24
Representative
Years	Team	Pld	T	G	FG	P
1983	New South Wales	2	0	0	0	0

Stan Jurd (born 22 November 1958), also known by the nickname of "Plunket", is an Australian former professional rugby league footballer who played in the 1980s. He played for the North Sydney Bears and Parramatta Eels in the New South Wales Rugby League (NSWRL) competition. Jurd primarily played in the front-row.

== Playing career ==
Jurd was born and grew up in Moree. After high school he moved to the ACT region, playing for the Queanbeyan Blues before joining North Sydney and then moving to Parramatta in 1983.

Jurd played two seasons at the North Sydney Bears between 1981 and 1982. He then joined Parramatta Eels for five seasons between 1983 and 1987, including winning the 1983 premiership with them. He was selected to represent New South Wales for games II and III of the 1983 State of Origin series. Injuries plagued the rest of his career until his retirement.
