= Darryl Brohman =

Australian rugby league footballer

Darryl Brohman OAM
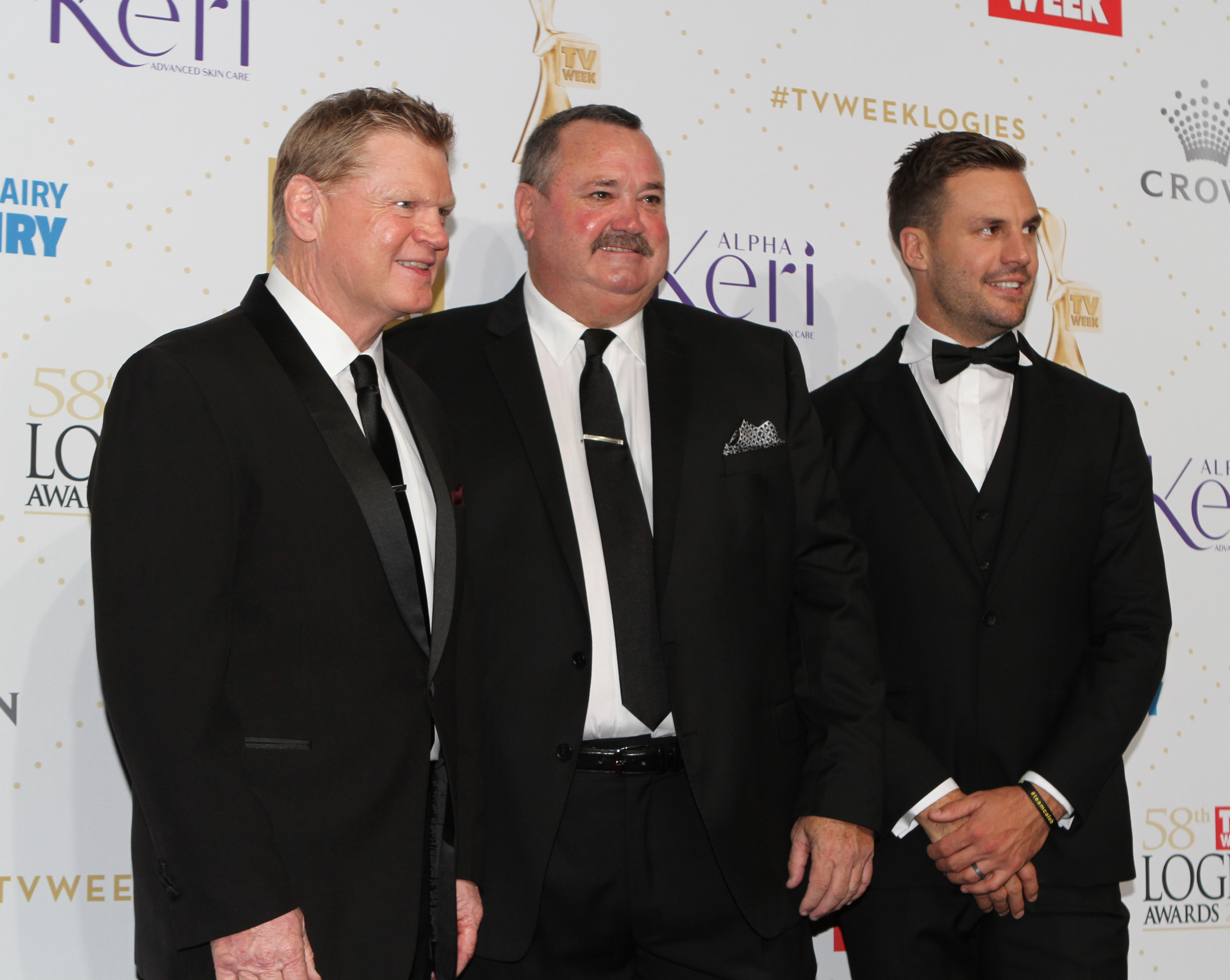
- Brohman (middle) in 2016

Personal information
- Full name: Darryl Gregory Brohman
- Born: 22 June 1956 (age 70) Brisbane, Queensland, Australia

Playing information
- Position: Prop
Club
Years	Team	Pld	T	G	FG	P
1974–78	Norths (Brisbane)
1979–83	Penrith Panthers	71	10	7	0	54
1984–85	Canterbury Bulldogs	23	0	0	0	0
1986–87	Penrith Panthers	20	2	0	0	8
	Total	114	12	7	0	62
Representative
Years	Team	Pld	T	G	FG	P
1983–86	Queensland	2	0	0	0	0

Darryl Gregory Brohman OAM (born 22 June 1956), also known by the nickname of "The Big Marn", is an Australian former professional rugby league footballer who played in the 1970s and 1980s, and coached in the 1980s, now best known as a commentator and media personality. Brohman played professional league for the Penrith Panthers, Canterbury-Bankstown Bulldogs and the Queensland rugby league team. At present, he is working for 2GB on its Continuous Call Team broadcasts, on The Footy Show and makes guest appearances on the Australian version of the ESPN show Pardon the Interruption. In the summer, he plays a small role in the nationally syndicated radio program entitled Summer Weekend Detention which broadcasts from the Sydney studios of 2GB on weekends during the summer months.

== Early life ==
Brohman attended Wavell State High School in Wavell Heights, one of Brisbane's northern suburbs, and completed his Senior year in 1974.

== Personal life ==
Brohman has a partner Beverly, and they have two children, daughters Lizzie and Ruby.

== Playing career ==
=== Brisbane ===
While still at high school, Brohman played first grade for Norths in Brisbane's competition and was developing into a skillful, ball-playing forward with a good kicking game. He was awarded the Norths Player of the Year in 1976 and won Brisbane's Rothmans Medal as the league's best and fairest player in the same year, joining John Brown, Steve Calder, Neville Draper and lookalike Darryl Duncan as winners of the award from the Norths club.

=== Sydney ===
Brohman then moved to Sydney and played for the Penrith Panthers, from 1979 to 1983 (being the club's captain from 1982 to 1983) and again from 1986 to 1987, and the Canterbury Bulldogs in 1984 and 1985. Brohman played two State of Origin matches for Queensland in 1983 and 1986.

In his Queensland debut in the opening match of the 1983 State of Origin series at Lang Park in Brisbane, Brohman had his jaw broken by an elbow tackle from Les Boyd, which saw him sidelined for the rest of the season. At the time, Brohman had been tipped to make his Test début in the series against New Zealand starting three days later, and would have been the Panthers' first international had this eventuated. That honour later went to hooker Royce Simmons in 1986. Ironically, the player who came off the bench for Queensland to replace Brohman, Manly-Warringah's Dave Brown, played well enough in the game to be selected in the front row for the test against the Kiwis at Carlaw Park. Brohman later sued Boyd over the incident and the matter was settled out of court.

Brohman returned to the playing field for the 1984 NSWRL season with the Canterbury-Bankstown Bulldogs, where his skills as a talented ball-playing forward under the leadership of Steve Mortimer helped the club to their Grand Final victory over the Parramatta Eels. His last match was for Penrith Panthers in the 1987 Reserve Grade Final win over Manly-Warringah at the Sydney Cricket Ground. Two of Brohman's teammates in the Panthers Reserve Grade side that day included future Australian internationals Mark Geyer and Mark Carroll.

== Post-playing ==
After he retired from playing, Brohman took up coaching for two seasons. Firstly, he coached the Brisbane Broncos' reserve grade side in 1988, before returning to Canterbury in 1989 to coach their reserve grade team. While at the Bulldogs, he lived rent-free at the home of Gus Gould for 15 months.

In 2006, he was nominated as the one of front rowers in the 40th Anniversary Penrith Panthers "Team of Legends" but lost out to Terry Geary (8 seasons – 1969–76) and Tim Sheens (13 seasons – 1970–82).

Brohman was awarded the Order of Australia Medal in the 2020 Australia Day Honours for "service to rugby league."

=== Media ===
Brohman later had a career in the media where he has worked for several radio stations across Sydney. Brohman's media career includes stints at 2KA, ABC Local Radio, 2UE, 2SM and once before at 2GB. He was a host on the Nine Network's The NRL Footy Show from 2010 to 2018, including hosting the "Small Talk" segment, until the show was cancelled after 25 years on air. Brohman has been part of the menswear chain Lowes's advertising campaigns, which also feature other former Rugby League players.
