= League 1 Cup =

Rugby League competition in England

iPro Sport Cup
- Sport: Rugby league
- Instituted: 2015
- Ceased: 2017
- Number of teams: 16
- Country: England; Wales (RFL)
- Holders: Barrow Raiders (1st title)
- Most titles: Barrow Raiders; Keighley Cougars; North Wales Crusaders (1 title)
- Website: Official Site
- Related competition: League 1 NCL

The League 1 Cup was a knockout cup competition organised by the Rugby Football League for the third division of rugby league in Britain. The cup was contested by the British League 1 teams, as well as two teams from the National Conference League. The final took place on the same weekend as The Summer Bash, and was the first game of the weekend to be played.

In 2017 it was announced the League 1 Cup would be retired after just three seasons.

== History ==
In 2013 the Championship Cup was decommissioned after 12 seasons and the Challenge Cup became the only cup competition available to the Championships. In 2015, as part of the new structure a new cup competition was to be introduced, but only available to League 1 clubs and two clubs invited from the National Conference League. The first final was played as the opening game of The Summer Bash at Bloomfield Road in Blackpool.

In 2017 the Rugby Football League (RFL) confirmed the 16 League 1 clubs had voted to scrap the League 1 Cup, mainly due to it interfering with the domestic league season. The last winners were Barrow Raiders.

== Format ==
The first round of the League 1 Cup is split into two pools; Northern regions and South and Midlands regions, all the League 1 clubs and any National Conference League (NCL) clubs invited to enter to make the number of teams up to 16 enter at this stage. A draw is made at the beginning of each round to determine fixtures.

In the first year of the cup, 2015, there were only 14 clubs in League 1 so two NCL clubs were invited to play in the competition. In 2016 and 2017 although there were 16 clubs in League 1, the non-UK based clubs; Toulouse Olympique (2016) and Toronto Wolfpack (2017); decided not to enter the cup so one NCL club was invited to play in their stead.

Other than a regional based first round to reduce travel costs, the cup is a knock-out competition with no seeding. Only the final is played at a neutral venue.

- First Round: 16 clubs enter
- Second Round: Last 8
- Semi Finals: Last 4.
- Final: Played at Bloomfield Road

== Cup Finals ==
| Year | Winners | Score | Runner–up | Venue | Attendance |
|---|---|---|---|---|---|
| 2015 | North Wales Crusaders | 12–8 | Swinton Lions | Bloomfield Road, Blackpool | 8,650 (Note: Attendance figure is the total for day 1 of the Summer Bash, not the number of spectators present when the game was played.) |
| 2016 | Keighley Cougars | 22–18 | York City Knights | Bloomfield Road, Blackpool | 9,521 |
| 2017 | Barrow Raiders | 38–32 | North Wales Crusaders | Bloomfield Road, Blackpool | 11,557 |

=== Winners ===
| Club | Wins | Last win | Runners-up | Last final lost |
|---|---|---|---|---|
| North Wales Crusaders | 1 | 2015 | 1 | 2017 |
| Keighley Cougars | 1 | 2016 | 0 | N/A |
| Barrow Raiders | 1 | 2017 | 0 | N/A |
| Swinton Lions | 0 | N/A | 1 | 2015 |
| York City Knights | 0 | N/A | 1 | 2016 |

== Sponsorship ==
In February 2015, the Rugby Football League (RFL) announced a 3-year deal with isotonic soft drink company iPro for the competition to be been known as the iPro Sport Cup.

The official rugby ball supplier was Steeden.

| Period | Sponsor | Name |
|---|---|---|
| 2015–2017 | iPro | iPro Sport Cup |
