= Ifiso Segeyaro =

PNG international rugby league footballer

Personal information
- Born: Papua New Guinea
- Died: 22 August 2014 Papua New Guinea

Playing information
- Position: Centre, Five-eighth
Representative
Years	Team	Pld	T	G	FG	P
1982–83	Papua New Guinea	2	1	0	0	4
- Relatives: James Segeyaro (son)

Ifiso Segeyaro was a Papua New Guinean rugby league footballer (Kumul #70) who represented Papua New Guinea. He is the father of fellow international, James Segeyaro.

== Playing career ==
Segeyaro represented Papua New Guinea in two test matches, in 1982 against Australia and in 1983 against New Zealand.

Segeyaro suffered a brain aneurysm and died on 22 August 2014. That weekend the PNG Hunters wore black armbands in the Queensland Cup. His son, James, returned to Papua New Guinea, missing that weekend's NRL match.
