= Cavill Heugh =

Australian rugby league footballer

Personal information
- Born: 31 August 1962 (age 64) Innisfail, Queensland, Australia

Playing information
- Height: 183 cm (6 ft 0 in)
- Weight: 104 kg (229 lb; 16 st 5 lb)
- Position: Prop
Club
Years	Team	Pld	T	G	FG	P
1980–86	Easts (Brisbane)	111	32	111	1	344
1985–86	Halifax	29	8	18	0	68
1987–89	Illawarra Steelers	48	7	4	0	36
1988–89	Barrow
1989–92	Leeds
1992–94	Rochdale Hornets	63	11	0	0	44
1994–95	London Broncos
1995–96	Wakefield Trinity	4	1	0	0	4
	Total	255	59	133	1	496
Representative
Years	Team	Pld	T	G	FG	P
1983–86	Queensland	3	0	0	0	0

Cavill Heugh (born 31 August 1962) is an Australian former professional rugby league footballer who played in the 1980s and 1990s. A prop, he played in the Brisbane Rugby League premiership for Easts, winning the Rothmans Medal with them in 1984. The following year he made his State of Origin début for the Maroons from the bench. The year after that he was selected in Queensland's run-on side.

== Background ==
Cavill Heugh was born in Innisfail, Queensland, Australia

== Playing career ==
Cavill Heugh won the 1984 Brisbane Rothmans Medal for best and fairest in the Brisbane Rugby League, while playing for Easts.

Heugh joined Halifax in September 1985 for the 1985–86 season and played 29 games in all competitions as Halifax won the Championship. He scored 7 tries and 12 goals in league games plus 1 try and 6 goals in a Yorkshire Cup match against Huddersfield.

In 1987 Heugh joined the Illawarra Steelers in the New South Wales Rugby League premiership, playing with them for three seasons from 1987 to 1989. He then moved to England where he played for Barrow (1988–89), Leeds (1989–92), Rochdale Hornets (1992–94), London Broncos (1994–95), and Wakefield Trinity.
