= John Brown (rugby league) =

New Zealand international rugby league footballer

Personal information
- Full name: John Patrick Brown
- Born: c.1886
- Died: 1965 (aged 78–79)

Playing information
- Position: Second-row
Club
Years	Team	Pld	T	G	FG	P
1919–20	Kohinoor	13	0	0	0	0
1919	Kohinoor-Blackball Combined	2	0	0	0	0
1920	Kohinoor-Runanga Combined	1	0	0	0	0
1920	Argus (work team)	1	0	0	0	0
	Total	17	0	0	0	0
Representative
Years	Team	Pld	T	G	FG	P
1919	New Zealand	2	0	0	0	0
1919–20	West Coast	4	0	0	0	0
1920	West Coast Trial	1	0	0	0	0
- Source: As of 24 October 2021

John Patrick Brown (fl. 1919–1922) was a New Zealand rugby league footballer.

A second-row forward, Brown played for the Kohinoor club (now known as Cobden-Kohinoor) in Greymouth. He was the first player from the West Coast to represent New Zealand.

He toured Australia in 1919 with the national side, a tour where no test matches were played.
