= Shane McNally =

Australian RL coach and former rugby league footballer (1954–2023)

Personal information
- Full name: Shane McNally
- Born: 19 May 1954
- Died: 11 August 2023 (aged 69) Canada

Playing information
- Position: Hooker , Front-Row
Club
| Years | Team | Pld | T | G | FG | P |
|---|---|---|---|---|---|---|
| 197?–74 | Northern Suburbs |
| 1975–78 | Western Suburbs |
| 1979–84 | Eastern Suburbs Tigers | 107 | | 405 | | 871 |
| | Total | 107 | 0 | 405 | 0 | 871 |
Representative
| Years | Team | Pld | T | G | FG | P |
| 1983 | Queensland | 2 | 0 | 11 | 0 | 22 |

Coaching information
Club
| Years | Team | Gms | W | D | L | W% |
| 2002–05 | Wakefield Trinity | 92 | 35 | 2 | 55 | 38 |
- As of 13 April 2021

Shane McNally (19 May 1954 – 11 August 2023) was an Australian rugby league footballer and Queensland Cup coach. He was sacked by Wakefield Trinity Wildcats in June 2005.

== Playing career ==
McNally started his playing career at Northern Suburbs before a move to Western Suburbs in 1975 where he made his first 'A' Grade appearance and captained the Premiership-winning Reserve Grade team under coach Don Oxenham in 1976. After three seasons at the Panthers, McNally moved to Gatton Hawks for a season where Gatton became the Ipswich Premiers, McNally scoring all points in the Grand Final, before accepting an offer to return to Brisbane with Eastern Suburbs Tigers. McNally played 107 'A' Grade games for Easts before retiring in 1984.

McNally was a prop-forward who was also a prolific goal kicker, winning the leading point-scorer trophy three times in the Brisbane 'A' grade competition. He was also a member of Easts' 1983 Premiership team, kicking 3 goals in a 14–6 defeat of Redcliffe Dolphins at Lang Park. McNally represented Queensland, captained by Wally Lewis on their 1983 tour of England, where he was top point scorer.

== Coaching career ==
Shortly following his retirement, McNally began his coaching career, taking charge of Easts 'A' grade in 1987 before coaching junior teams at East Mt Gravatt. He coached Easts 'Colts' (under 19) team to a 3rd-place finish in 1991 before winning a premiership in 1992, a team that featured future State of Origin players Geoff Bell and Paul Green.

In 1993 he accepted a job as Development Officer for South-East Division of the Queensland Rugby League. In 1998 he moved to Darwin to take up Head Coach of the Rugby League program at the Northern Territory Institute of Sport. It was in Brisbane in the seventies that he first met the-then Wakefield Trinity Wildcats Head Coach, Peter Roe.

McNally was appointed assistant coach to Peter Roe at Wakefield Trinity in November 2001, and was placed in temporary charge in July 2002 after Roe was sacked. His first match in charge was a 22–22 draw against Widnes Vikings at Belle Vue Stadium. The following week, Wakefield Trinity Wildcats travelled to London, winning 31–24 over the London Broncos after trailing 0–18 at half time. Following this match, McNally was appointed Football Manager / Coach, in partnership with Adrian Vowles, who was signed as Player / Coach. Under this leadership, Wakefield stayed up on the last day of the season after defeating Warrington 50–10.

In season 2003, the Wakefield Trinity Wildcats struggled to 11th in the Super League table and Vowles was released by the club. McNally was appointed Head Coach on a 1-year contract.

Season 2004 was a watershed year for Wakefield, who finished the Super League regular season in 6th place with 30 points. In the first elimination semi-final they defeated Hull F.C. 28–18 at the KC Stadium, setting up a semi final clash with Wigan Warriors at the JJB Stadium. Although they led 14–0 early in the match, Wakefield Trinity Wildcats were defeated 14–18 with a controversial 'no-try' ruling costing them dearly. McNally was subsequently awarded the 'Coach of the Year' award and signed a new two-year deal with Wakefield to the end of 2006.

Season 2005 started just as brightly for the Wakefield Trinity Wildcats, winning away at Bradford Bulls and home to WiganWarriors, to lead the Super League table for the first time in their history after 2 rounds. The sale of captain Gareth Ellis, coupled with injuries to key players Sid Domic and David Solomona disrupted Wakefield however and after a series of losses, McNally was sacked in June. His last game in charge was a 28–40 loss to the Huddersfield Giants.

McNally returned to his native Australia in August 2005, where he took a position of Development Manager with the Wynnum Manly Seagulls in the Queensland Cup. After the resignation of Wynnum head coach Neil Wharton in August 2006, McNally was appointed head coach of the Seagulls for the 2007 season.

McNally had four children; two sons and two daughters. He died on 11 August 2023, at the age of 69.

Sporting positions
| Preceded by Peter Roe; 2001–2002 | Coach Wakefield Trinity; 2002–2005 | Succeeded by Tony Smith; 2005–2006 |
