= Wayne Challis =

Australian rugby league footballer

Personal information
- Full name: Wayne Challis
- Born: 7 March 1963 (age 62)

Playing information
- Position: Wing
Club
Years	Team	Pld	T	G	FG	P
1985–89	Eastern Suburbs	51	26	0	0	104
Representative
Years	Team	Pld	T	G	FG	P
1982	Queensland	1	3	0	0	12
- Source: As of 17 January 2023

Wayne Challis is an Australian former professional rugby league footballer who played in the 1980s. He played for Eastern Suburbs in the NSWRL competition.

== Playing career ==
Before making his first grade debut, Challis represented Queensland in one match of the 1982 New Zealand tour of Australia. Challis scored a hat-trick in the game as Queensland won 31-16. In round 2 of the 1985 NSWRL season, Challis made his debut for Eastern Suburbs against Cronulla with Challis scoring a try in Easts 28-8 victory. Challis finished the 1985 season as Easts top try scorer. In the 1987 NSWRL season, Challis played in both of Eastern Suburbs finals games against Canberra. This would be the last year the club would reach the finals until 1996. Challis played his final game for Easts in round 6 of the 1989 season.
