= Chris Phelan =

Australian rugby league player (1955–2026)

Personal information
- Born: 12 December 1955 Borris-in-Ossory, County Laois, Ireland
- Died: 5 May 2026 (aged 70) Brisbane, Queensland, Australia

Playing information
- Position: Prop
Club
Years	Team	Pld	T	G	FG	P
1980–81	Souths Magpies
1982–84	Parramatta Eels	53	5	0	0	18
1984–85	Oldham	11	0			?
1985–??	Souths Magpies	?				?
	Total		5	0	0
Representative
Years	Team	Pld	T	G	FG	P
1981–84	Queensland	4	0	0	0	0

Chris Phelan (12 December 1955 – 5 May 2026) was an Irish-born Australian rugby league footballer who played in the 1980s. He was a state representative versatile forward for Queensland and a two-time New South Wales Rugby League premiership-winner with the Parramatta Eels.

Phelan was born in Borris-in-Ossory, Ireland. Immensely strong for his size, the Townsville forward was playing for Brisbane's Southern Suburbs club when he was first selected for Queensland at lock in all three games of the 1981 interstate series. Phelan was the Brisbane Rugby League premierships Rothmans Medal winner that year and also won the Grand Final with Souths.

He signed to Sydney's defending premiers Parramatta in 1982. He had to sit out the start of the 1982 while Parramatta waged a battle with the Queensland Rugby League over his transfer fee.

Phelan played at prop in the Eels' two Grand Final wins over Manly in 1982 and 1983 but moved to the second-row for the 6–4 loss in the 1984 decider against Canterbury. In 1984 he was recalled to the Queensland side for game III of the State of Origin series where he appeared at second-row.

After a season with Oldham in England, Phelan returned to his home state in 1985 and continued playing with Souths, helping them to victory in the 1985 Brisbane Rugby League grand final.

In 2008, he was named in the Souths Magpies team of the century.

Phelan died of pancreatic cancer in Brisbane, on 5 May 2026, at the age of 70.
