= Brad Tessmann =

Australia international rugby league footballer

Personal information
- Full name: Brad Tessmann
- Born: 9 February 1960 (age 66) Kingaroy, Queensland, Australia

Playing information
- Position: Prop
Club
Years	Team	Pld	T	G	FG	P
1980–83	Southern Suburbs	31	2	2	0	10
1984	Redcliffe	6	0	0	0	0
1985–87	Eastern Suburbs	57	2	0	0	8
1988	Brisbane Broncos	4	0	0	0	0
	Total	98	4	2	0	18
Representative
Years	Team	Pld	T	G	FG	P
1983–86	Queensland	5	0	0	0	0
1983	Australia	1	0	0	0	0
- Source: As of 23 January 2019

Brad Tessmann (born 9 February 1960 in Kingaroy, Queensland) is an Australian former professional rugby league footballer who played in the 1980s.

== Playing career ==
Tessman captained the Queensland Under 18 side in 1978.

Tessmann played in Souths' loss to Wynnum-Manly in the 1982 Brisbane Rugby League premiership's grand final. Tessmann's sole Test appearance was in Australia's 19–12 loss to New Zealand while playing for Brisbane Souths in 1983.

In 1984 Tessmann played a major role in an Oceania team's 54-4 victory over an Anglo-French selection in an exhibition match Paris, returning to Brisbane after the match to continue playing for Redcliffe. Tessman played six games for Redcliffe that season.

A hard-working forward, he played in Queensland's victorious State of Origin side that year and his success at international level earned him a contract with Easts in 1985.

He was a representative in the Oceania side that played in France in 1984 but his move to Sydney was short-lived, although he did gain selection for Queensland in the 1986 State of Origin series. He spent the second half of the 1987 season out of the game with a knee injury and in 1988 Tessmann returned to Brisbane to play for the Broncos in the club's debut season.

== Post playing ==
Tessmann is currently chairman of the Central Australian Rugby Football League, based in Alice Springs, Northern Territory.
