= Wally Fullerton Smith =

Australia international rugby league footballer

Personal information
- Full name: Walter John Fullerton-Smith
- Born: 9 July 1960 (age 65) Roma, Queensland, Australia

Playing information
- Position: Second-row, Lock
Club
Years	Team	Pld	T	G	FG	P
1980–86	Redcliffe	92	8	0	0	30
1982–83	Tonneins
1984–85	Leeds	25	7	0	0	28
1987–92	St. George Dragons	79	5	0	0	20
	Total	196	20	0	0	78
Representative
Years	Team	Pld	T	G	FG	P
1983–90	Queensland	12	0	0	0	0
1983–88	Australia	8	1	0	0	4
- Source: As of 15 November 2010

Wally John Fullerton-Smith (born 9 July 1960) is an Australian former professional rugby league footballer who played in the 1980s and 1990s. An Australian international and Queensland State of Origin representative back-rower, he played club football in Queensland, France, England and New South Wales.

The Redcliffe forward, originally from Roma, Queensland, spent four months in France with the Tonneins club in 1982–83 before using the State of Origin stage to force his way into the Australian side against New Zealand in 1983. Fullerton Smith played in the last two Tests against Great Britain in 1984 before joining English club Leeds in the 1984-85 off-season.

He toured New Zealand again in 1985 and was named man-of-the-match in the third game of that year's State of Origin series.

After signing with St. George Dragons in 1987, he was a member of the Dragons team that won the 1988 Panasonic Cup. His rep career continued with three Test appearances against Great Britain in 1988. On 20 July 1988 Fullerton Smith played for Australia in their record 62-point win over Papua New Guinea, scoring a try. The match against Rest of the World that year proved to be his last for Australia although his Sydney career with the St. George Dragons continued until the end of the 1992 season. Fullerton Smith then set off for the Cote de Azur to play with Cannes in the French National League. Cannes won their respective competition in the 1992/1993 season.
