= Colin Scott (rugby league) =

Australia international rugby league footballer

Personal information
- Born: 23 March 1960 (age 66) Charters Towers, Queensland, Australia

Playing information
- Position: Fullback, Wing
Club
Years	Team	Pld	T	G	FG	P
1980	Eastern Suburbs	12	3	0	0	9
1981–87	Wynnum-Manly	93	34	152	2	428
1985–87	Castleford	25	10	8	1	57
1988	Brisbane Broncos	14	2	0	0	8
	Total	144	49	160	3	502
Representative
Years	Team	Pld	T	G	FG	P
1979–87	Queensland	33	1	2	0	8
1983	Australia	1	0	0	0	0

Colin Scott (born 23 March 1960) is an Australian former rugby league footballer who played in the 1970s and 1980s. Primarily a fullback, he was an inaugural player for the Queensland State of Origin team and the Brisbane Broncos.

== Background ==
Born in Charters Towers, Queensland, Scott is of Indigenous descent and played his junior rugby league for Souths Townsville, alongside future teammate Gene Miles.

== Playing career ==
Scott played senior rugby league for Souths Townsville, where he first represented Queensland in the interstate series in 1979. In 1980, he moved to Brisbane, joining the Easts Tigers. That season, he was selected at fullback for the first ever State of Origin game, despite being in reserve grade at the time.

In 1981, Scott moved to the Wynnum Manly Seagulls, starting at fullback in their BRL's Grand Final victory over Souths Magpies a year later. Despite being the incumbent Queensland fullback for 3 years, Scott missed a place on the 1982 Kangaroo tour of Great Britain and France. He would go on to make his Test debut at fullback for Australia in their second Test match against New Zealand at Lang Park in 1983 after an injury to incumbent Test fullback Greg Brentnall. Despite 25 appearances for his state during his career (including 17 State of Origin appearances), Scott did not represent Australia again. Scott was sent off 18 minutes into Wynnum's semi-final win over Southern Suburbs in 1984, and subsequently missed the grand final.

In 1985, Scott joined English club Castleford, spending two seasons with the club. That year, he played fullback in their 18–22 loss to Hull Kingston Rovers in the 1985 Yorkshire Cup Final played at Headingley in Leeds. In 1986, he was Castleford's fullback in their 31–24 victory over Hull F.C. in the 1986 Yorkshire Cup Final also played at Headingley.

Scott played for Queensland in the Interstate series and State of Origin series from 1979 to 1987, until losing his place as first choice fullback to former Souths Magpies and then-Canberra Raiders fullback Gary Belcher in 1986, though he was recalled to the team on the wing for Games 2 and 3 in 1987, mostly due to injury to regular Maroons centre and goal kicker Mal Meninga (the first of his 4 broken arms in 2 years). During the series, Scott came in for heavy criticism for his poor goal kicking and handling errors. Scott played his last game for Queensland from the bench in 1987 series exhibition game at Veterans Memorial Stadium in California.

In 1988, Scott joined the newly established Brisbane Broncos, who were admitted to the New South Wales Rugby League premiership. He spent just one season at the club, playing 14 games, including their first ever premiership game, a 44–8 thumping of the reigning Winfield Cup Premiers Manly-Warringah at Lang Park.

== Post-playing career ==
In 2000, Scott was awarded the Australian Sports Medal for his contribution to Australia's international standing in rugby league.
