= Summer Bash =

Rugby league weekend where all Championship fixtures are played at the same venue

- Other names: Blackpool Bash
- Location: Blackpool
- Teams: 14
- First meeting: 2015
- Latest meeting: 2023
- Broadcasters: Sky Sports
- Stadiums: Bloomfield Road

The Summer Bash is an annual event organised by the Rugby Football League. An entire round of Championship matches are played in a city to showcase the sport of rugby league. It was held at Bloomfield Road, Blackpool from 2015 to 2019.

== Concept ==
The Summer Bash was introduced in 2015 after the success of the Super League Magic Weekend. It is an extra round for the Championship teams to compete in, usually a local derby. The event takes place over a single weekend in which three regular season games are played back-to-back on each day with an extra fourth game being played on the Saturday which is the final of the League 1 Cup.

== History ==
The games played were, when possible, 'local derby' matches in an attempt to maximise interest in the event. The "non-heartland" sides were paired against each other. An extra match on the Saturday, was the final of the inaugural League 1 Cup between North Wales Crusaders and Swinton.

After a successful inaugural Summer Bash in Blackpool in 2015 it returned to Blackpool in 2016 with mostly local derbies being played apart from Bradford vs Leigh and Sheffield Eagles vs London Broncos not being geographical derbies and were based on league positions. Once again, the League 1 Cup final took place as the opening game to the weekend.

The event returned to Blackpool's Bloomfield Road for a third consecutive year after the previous years record attendances. The Summer Bash once again opened with the League 1 Cup final.

The event returned to Blackpool's Bloomfield Road for a fourth consecutive year after the previous years record attendances. The Summer Bash this year opened with a Women's Super League fixture.

The event returned to Blackpool's Bloomfield Road for a fifth consecutive year.

The 2020 Summer Bash was scheduled to return to Blackpool for a sixth consecutive year, however was cancelled due to the COVID-19 pandemic in the United Kingdom.

The 2021 Summer Bash was also cancelled due to the COVID-19 pandemic in the United Kingdom. Fixtures were never released.

In 2022, the Summer Bash was held at Headingley.

In 2023, the Summer Bash was held at York Community Stadium.

== Venues ==
	City	Stadium	Years
1	Blackpool	Bloomfield Road	2015, 2016, 2017, 2018, 2019
2	Leeds	Headingley Stadium	2022
2	York	York Community Stadium	2023

=== Attendances ===
Year	City	Stadium	Attendance
2015	Blackpool	Bloomfield Road	15,381
2016	Blackpool	Bloomfield Road	▲15,912
2017	Blackpool	Bloomfield Road	▲16,444
2018	Blackpool	Bloomfield Road	▼11,805
2019	Blackpool	Bloomfield Road	▲15,070
2022	Leeds	Headingley Stadium	
2023	York	York Community Stadium	

==== Highest single day attendance ====
Year	City	Stadium	Attendance
2017	(England) Blackpool	Bloomfield Road	11,557

==== Lowest single day attendance ====
Year	City	Stadium	Attendance
2018	(England) Blackpool	Bloomfield Road	3,928

==== Highest weekend attendance ====
Year	City	Stadium	Attendance
2017	(England) Blackpool	Bloomfield Road	16,444

==== Lowest weekend attendance ====
Year	City	Stadium	Attendance
2018	(England) Blackpool	Bloomfield Road	11,805

== See also ==
- Magic Weekend
- League 1 Cup
