= Terry Butler (rugby league) =

Australian rugby league footballer

Personal information
- Born: 22 April 1958 Kyogle, New South Wales, Australia
- Died: 4 October 2016 (aged 58)

Playing information
- Position: Wing
Club
Years	Team	Pld	T	G	FG	P
	Wynnum Manly Seagulls
1986	North Sydney Bears	4	0	0	0	0
	Total	4	0	0	0	0
Representative
Years	Team	Pld	T	G	FG	P
1983	Queensland	1	0	0	0	0

Terry Butler (22 April 1958 – 4 October 2016) was an Australian professional rugby league footballer. He played for Wynnum-Manly Seagulls in the Brisbane Rugby League premiership's grand final victory in 1982 as a winger, scoring the first try of the match. The following year he was selected to represent Queensland in Game II of the 1983 State of Origin series. He later had an uneventful year with the North Sydney Bears in the New South Wales Rugby League competition in 1986. He was 58 when he died of cancer in 2016.
