= Steve Stacey =

Australian rugby league footballer

Personal information
- Born: 29 January 1958 (age 68)

Playing information
- Position: Wing
Club
Years	Team	Pld	T	G	FG	P
1984–85	Salford	7	6	0	0	24
Representative
Years	Team	Pld	T	G	FG	P
1983	Queensland	2	1			4

Steve Stacey (born 1958) is an Australian former rugby league footballer who played in the 1980s.

== Biography ==
Steve Stacey made only two appearances for Queensland, scoring a try in the 1983 series.

He had a brief spell with English rugby league club Salford during the 1984–85 season.
