= Gavin Jones (rugby league) =

Australian rugby league footballer

Personal information
- Full name: Gavin Paul Bauer Jones
- Born: 1 January 1964 (age 62) Brisbane, Queensland, Australia

Playing information
- Height: 185 cm (6 ft 1 in)
- Weight: 107 kg (16 st 12 lb)
- Position: Prop
Club
Years	Team	Pld	T	G	FG	P
	Easts (BRL)
1986–95	North Sydney	120	2	0	0	8
1996	Cronulla-Sutherland	16	0	0	0	0
	Total	136	2	0	0	8
Representative
Years	Team	Pld	T	G	FG	P
1983–86	Queensland	4	0	0	0	0

Gavin Jones (born 1 January 1964) is an Australian former rugby league footballer who played in the 1980s and 1990s. He played for Eastern Suburbs in Brisbane Rugby League premiership from age 19. Jones also played first-grade rugby league in New South Wales Rugby League premiership for North Sydney Bears and Cronulla-Sutherland Sharks.

== Playing career ==
Jones began his playing career with the Easts Tigers before moving to Sydney after signing with Norths. In 1986, Norths enjoyed a strong season on the field finishing 5th and qualifying for the finals with Jones making 23 appearances. Jones also played in the 1986 State of Origin series against New South Wales featuring in all 3 games.

In 1991, Jones missed most of the season due to injury as Norths had one of their best seasons on the field in many years finishing 3rd on the table. Jones returned to the field just as the finals series began and played in all 3 of the club's matches as the club came close to reaching their first grand final in 48 years.

In 1994, Jones made 21 appearances as Norths finished 2nd on the table and defeated reigning premiers Brisbane on the way to the preliminary final against Canberra. Jones played from the bench in the club's 22–9 loss.

Jones last appearance for Norths was in Round 7 1995 against St George before being released at the end of the year. In 1996, Jones moved to Cronulla-Sutherland and made 16 appearances for the club including the 24-0 preliminary final defeat against Manly. This would also prove to be Jones last game in first grade.

== Post playing ==
Jones is currently, according to his profile at FOGS, an accounts manager at IGT.

== Sources ==
- Alan Whiticker & Glen Hudson (2007). The Encyclopedia of Rugby League Players. Wetherill Park, New South Wales: Gary Allen Pty Ltd. ISBN 978-1-877082-93-1.
