= 1995 Illawarra Steelers season =

Illawarra Steelers
- 1995 season
- CEO: (Australia) Bob Millward
- Head coach: (Australia) Graham Murray, Allan Fitzgibbon
- Captain: (Australia) John Cross
- ARL: 12th (out of 20)
- Top try scorer: Club: Paul McGregor, Shaun Timmins, Rod Wishart (11)
- Top points scorer: Club: Rod Wishart (176)
- Highest home attendance: 13,127 (vs Brisbane Broncos in Round 3)
- Lowest home attendance: 7,780 (vs Parramatta Eels in Round 16)
- Average home attendance: 9,651

The 1995 Illawarra Steelers season was the club's fourteenth season in its history. During the height of the Super League War, the club lost its coach, Graham Murray after round 4, with club legend Allan Fitzgibbon taking over in a caretaker role for the rest of the season. The Steelers finished the season in 12th, missing the finals series.

== Players ==
=== Squad ===
No.

Position
Player

Glen Air – HB Keith Beauchamp – WG Anthony Bonus – PR Jonathon Britten – WG Dean Callaway – HK John Cross – LK (captain) Michael Cross – CE Ben Duckworth – LK Scott England – PR Darren Fritz – PR Peter Johnston – PR Paul McGregor – CE Martin Masella – PR Dean Moon – WG

No.

Position
Player

Brendan O'Meara – WG Peter Phillips – FE Neil Piccinelli – SR Wayne Richards – SR David Riolo – FB Brett Rodwell – CE Craig Simon – FE John Simon – HB Sean Skelton – HK Hamish Smith – LK Rex Terp – WG Shaun Timmins – CE David Walsh – PR Rod Wishart – WG

== Ladder ==
	Team	Pld	W	D	L	PF	PA	PD	Pts
1	Manly	22	20	0	2	687	248	+439	40
2	Canberra	22	20	0	2	634	255	+379	40
3	Brisbane	22	17	0	5	600	364	+236	34
4	Cronulla	22	16	0	6	516	287	+229	32
5	Newcastle	22	15	0	7	549	396	+153	30
6	Sydney Bulldogs (P)	22	14	0	8	468	352	+116	28
7	St. George	22	13	0	9	583	382	+201	26
8	North Sydney	22	11	2	9	542	331	+211	24
9	Sydney City	22	12	0	10	466	406	+60	24
10	Auckland	22	13	0	9	544	493	+51	24
11	Western Reds	22	11	0	11	361	549	-188	22
12	Illawarra	22	10	1	11	519	431	+88	21
13	Western Suburbs	22	10	0	12	459	534	-75	20
14	Penrith	22	9	0	13	481	484	-3	18
15	Sydney Tigers	22	7	0	15	309	591	-282	14
16	South Queensland	22	6	1	15	303	502	-199	13
17	Gold Coast	22	4	1	17	350	628	-278	9
18	South Sydney	22	4	1	17	319	686	-367	9
19	Parramatta	22	3	0	19	310	690	-380	6
20	North Queensland	22	2	0	20	269	660	-391	4

- Auckland Warriors were stripped of 2 competition points due to exceeding the replacement limit in round 3.

== Home Crowd Averages ==
Round	Opposition	Venue	Crowd
Round 2	Auckland Warriors	Steelers Stadium	12,127
Round 3	Brisbane Broncos	Steelers Stadium	13,127
Round 5	Gold Coast Seagulls	Steelers Stadium	8,358
Round 8	North Queensland Cowboys	Steelers Stadium	8,914
Round 10	Sydney Bulldogs	Steelers Stadium	8,457
Round 11	Canberra Raiders	Steelers Stadium	10,219
Round 13	North Sydney Bears	Steelers Stadium	9,418
Round 16	Parramatta Eels	Steelers Stadium	7,780
Round 18	Newcastle Knights	Steelers Stadium	10,098
Round 20	Sydney Tigers	Steelers Stadium	8,257
Round 22	Western Suburbs Magpies	Steelers Stadium	9,230
Season Total			106,165
Season Average			9,651
www.rugbyleagueproject.org
