= 1989 Panasonic Cup (rugby league) =

1989 NSWRL Midweek Cup
NSWRL Panasonic Cup

Tournament details
- Dates: 1 March – 7 June 1989
- Teams: 19
- Venue(s): 9 (in 9 host cities)

Final positions
- Champions: Brisbane (1st title)
- Runners-up: Illawarra

Tournament statistics
- Matches played: 18

The 1989 Panasonic Cup was the 16th edition of the NSWRL Midweek Cup, a NSWRL-organised national club Rugby League tournament between the leading clubs and representative teams from the NSWRL, the BRL, the CRL and Papua New Guinea. This was the final season of the competition, which was replaced by the Tooheys Challenge Cup the following year.

A total of 19 teams from across Australia and Papua New Guinea played 18 matches in a straight knock-out format, with the matches being held midweek during the premiership season.

== Qualified teams ==
| Team | Nickname | League | Qualification | Participation (bold indicates winners) |
|---|---|---|---|---|
| Canterbury-Bankstown | Bulldogs | NSWRL | Winners of the 1988 New South Wales Rugby League Premiership | 16th (Previous: 1974, 1975, 1976, 1977, 1978, 1979, 1980, 1981, 1982, 1983, 1984, 1985, 1986, 1987, 1988) |
| Balmain | Tigers | NSWRL | Runners-Up in the 1988 New South Wales Rugby League Premiership | 16th (Previous: 1974, 1975, **1976**, 1977, 1978, 1979, 1980, 1981, 1982, 1983, 1984, **1985**, 1986, **1987**, 1988) |
| Cronulla-Sutherland | Sharks | NSWRL | Third Place in the 1988 New South Wales Rugby League Premiership | 16th (Previous: 1974, 1975, 1976, 1977, 1978, **1979**, 1980, 1981, 1982, 1983, 1984, 1985, 1986, 1987, 1988) |
| Canberra | Raiders | NSWRL | Fourth Place in the 1988 New South Wales Rugby League Premiership | 8th (Previous: 1982, 1983, 1984, 1985, 1986, 1987, 1988) |
| Manly-Warringah | Sea Eagles | NSWRL | Fifth Place in the 1988 New South Wales Rugby League Premiership | 16th (Previous: 1974, 1975, 1976, 1977, 1978, 1979, 1980, 1981, **1982**, **1983**, 1984, 1985, 1986, 1987, 1988) |
| Penrith | Panthers | NSWRL | Sixth Place in the 1988 New South Wales Rugby League Premiership | 16th (Previous: 1974, 1975, 1976, 1977, 1978, 1979, 1980, 1981, 1982, 1983, 1984, 1985, 1986, 1987, 1988) |
| Brisbane | Broncos | NSWRL | Seventh Place in the 1988 New South Wales Rugby League Premiership | 2nd (Previous: 1988) |
| South Sydney | Rabbitohs | NSWRL | Eighth Place in the 1988 New South Wales Rugby League Premiership | 16th (Previous: 1974, 1975, 1976, 1977, 1978, 1979, 1980, **1981**, 1982, 1983, 1984, 1985, 1986, 1987, 1988) |
| North Sydney | Bears | NSWRL | Ninth Place in the 1988 New South Wales Rugby League Premiership | 16th (Previous: 1974, 1975, 1976, 1977, 1978, 1979, 1980, 1981, 1982, 1983, 1984, 1985, 1986, 1987, 1988) |
| St. George | Dragons | NSWRL | Tenth Place in the 1988 New South Wales Rugby League Premiership | 16th (Previous: 1974, 1975, 1976, 1977, 1978, 1979, 1980, 1981, 1982, 1983, 1984, 1985, 1986, 1987, **1988**) |
| Parramatta | Eels | NSWRL | Eleventh Place in the 1988 New South Wales Rugby League Premiership | 16th (Previous: 1974, 1975, 1976, 1977, 1978, 1979, **1980**, 1981, 1982, 1983, 1984, 1985, **1986**, 1987, 1988) |
| Eastern Suburbs | Roosters | NSWRL | Twelfth Place in the 1988 New South Wales Rugby League Premiership | 16th (Previous: 1974, **1975**, 1976, 1977, **1978**, 1979, 1980, 1981, 1982, 1983, 1984, 1985, 1986, 1987, 1988) |
| Illawarra | Steelers | NSWRL | Thirteenth Place in the 1988 New South Wales Rugby League Premiership | 8th (Previous: 1982, 1983, 1984, 1985, 1986, 1987, 1988) |
| Newcastle | Knights | NSWRL | Fourteenth Place in the 1988 New South Wales Rugby League Premiership | 2nd (Previous: 1988) |
| Gold Coast-Tweed | Giants | NSWRL | Fifteenth Place in the 1988 New South Wales Rugby League Premiership | 2nd (Previous: 1988) |
| Western Suburbs | Magpies | NSWRL | Sixteenth Place in the 1988 New South Wales Rugby League Premiership | 16th (Previous: 1974, 1975, 1976, **1977**, 1978, 1979, 1980, 1981, 1982, 1983, 1984, 1985, 1986, 1987, 1988) |
| Brisbane | Poinsettias | BRL | League Representative Team | 11th (Previous: 1979, 1980, 1981, 1982, 1983, **1984**, 1985, 1986, 1987, 1988) |
| NSW Country | Kangaroos | CRL | Country League Representative Team | 11th (Previous: 1979, 1980, 1981, 1982, 1983, 1984, 1985, 1986, 1987, 1988) |
| Port Moresby | Vipers | PNGRFL | League Representative Team | 4th (Previous: 1986, 1987, 1988) |

== Venues ==
| Sydney | Bathurst | Wagga Wagga | Parkes | Townsville | Perth | Brisbane | Tweed Heads | Port Moresby |
|---|---|---|---|---|---|---|---|---|
| Parramatta Stadium | Carrington Park | Eric Weissel Oval | Pioneer Oval | Townsville Sports Reserve | WACA Ground | Lang Park | Seagulls Stadium | Lloyd Robson Oval |
| Capacity: 28,000 | Capacity: 12,000 | Capacity: 10,000 | Capacity: 12,000 | Capacity: 13,000 | Capacity: 20,000 | Capacity: 45,000 | Capacity: 13,500 | Capacity: 15,000 |

=== Preliminary rounds ===
| Date | Winner | Score | Loser | Score | Venue | Man of the Match |
|---|---|---|---|---|---|---|
| 4/04/89 | Combined Brisbane (Bourke, Daunt, Harvey, Cook tries, Harvey 2 goals, Daunt field goal) | 21 | Port Moresby (PNG) (Ipu, Akuila tries, Akuila 2 goals) | 12 | Lloyd Robson Oval | |
| 7/04/89 | Combined Brisbane (Smith try, Harvey 2 goals), Daunt field goal) | 9 | NSW Country (Elwin goal) | 2 | Seagulls Stadium | |
| 12/04/89 | St George (Mohr, Walford, Coyne tries, Walford goal) | 14 | Combined Brisbane (Cook, McIntosh tries, Harvey goal) | 10 | Lang Park | Kevin Langer – Combined Brisbane |

=== Qualifying round ===
| Date | Winner | Score | Loser | Score | Venue | Man of the Match |
|---|---|---|---|---|---|---|
| 1/03/89 | Brisbane (Matterson 2, Tessmann tries, Matterson 2, G.French goals) | 18 | Canberra (Lazarus, K.Walters tries, Wood 2 goals, Stuart field goal) | 13 | Pioneer Oval | Terry Matterson – Brisbane |
| 8/03/89 | South Sydney (Blake, Longbottom 2, Lyons, P.Roberts tries, Ellison 6 goals) | 36 | Penrith (McIndoe 2 tries, Baker 2 goals) | 12 | Parramatta Stadium | Phil Blake – South Sydney |
| 10/03/89 | Parramatta (Sterling, Lauriie, Wynn tries, Fitzhenry 5 goals) | 22 | Balmain (Grant, Chalmers tries, Brooks 2 goals) | 12 | WACA Ground | Peter Sterling – Parramatta |
| 15/03/89 | Canterbury-Bankstown (McCarthy 3, Lamb tries, Lamb 4 goals) | 24 | Newcastle (Quinton goal) | 2 | Parramatta Stadium | Andrew Farrar – Canterbury-Bankstown |
| 22/03/89 | Cronulla-Sutherland (Picken, Docking, Wilson tries, Wilson 4, Watson goals) | 22 | Eastern Suburbs (Salvatori, Melrose tries, Smith goal) | 10 | Parramatta Stadium | Alan Wilson – Cronulla-Sutherland |
| 29/03/89 | Illawarra (Kissell, Heugh, Larder tries) | 12 | Western Suburbs | 0 | Parramatta Stadium | Steve Larder – Illawarra |
| 19/04/89 | North Sydney (McArthur, Maguire tries, McArthur 2 goals, Gale field goal) | 13 | Gold Coast (Close try, Eden goal) | 6 | Parramatta Stadium | Greg Florimo – North Sydney |
| 26/04/89 | Manly-Warringah (Ryan 2, Hasler, Williams tries, Shearer 3 goals) | 22 | St George (Walford, Mohr tries, Walford goal) | 10 | Eric Weissel Oval | Des Hasler – Manly-Warringah |

=== Quarter finals ===
| Date | Winner | Score | Loser | Score | Venue | Man of the Match |
|---|---|---|---|---|---|---|
| 5/04/89 | South Sydney (Mavin try, Ellison 2 goals, Blake, Ellison field goals) * | 10 | Canterbury-Bankstown (Alchin try, Lamb 2, Corcoran goals) | 10 | Parramatta Stadium | Ian Roberts – South Sydney |
| 3/05/89 | North Sydney (McPhail, B.French, Jones tries, Dorahy 2 goals) | 16 | Manly-Warringah (Shearer, Toovey tries) | 8 | Parramatta Stadium | Martin Bella – North Sydney |
| 10/05/89 | Illawarra (Rodwell 3, Hardy 2, Wishart, Kissell, Russell tries, Wishart 4 goals) | 40 | Cronulla-Sutherland | 0 | Parramatta Stadium | Dean Schifilliti – Illawarra |
| 17/05/89 | Brisbane (Lewis 3, Renouf 2, Matterson, French tries, Matterson 7 goals) | 42 | Parramatta (Leeds try, Fitzhenry goal) | 6 | Townsville Sports Reserve | Terry Matterson – Brisbane |

=== Semi finals ===
| Date | Winner | Score | Loser | Score | Venue | Man of the Match |
|---|---|---|---|---|---|---|
| 24/05/89 | Illawarra + (Wishart, Schifilliti tries, Wishart 2 goals) | 12 | North Sydney (Florimo, Beaven tries, Kiss 2 goals) | 12 | Parramatta Stadium | Greg Florimo – North Sydney |
| 31/05/89 | Brisbane (Jackson 2, Currie, Le Man, Renouf tries, French 2 goals) | 24 | South Sydney (Blake try) | 4 | Carrington Park | Peter Jackson – Brisbane |

=== Final ===
==== Teams ====
Brisbane : 1. Shane Duffy, 2. Michael Hancock, 3. Tony Currie, 4. Peter Jackson, 5. Joe Kilroy, 6. Wally Lewis (c), 7. Allan Langer, 13. Terry Matterson, 12. Gene Miles, 11. Brett Le Man, 10. Sam Backo, 9. Kerrod Walters, 8. Greg Dowling Reserve James Donnelly. Coach: Wayne Bennett.

Illawarra : 1. Steve Hampson, 2. Rod Wishart, 3. Brett Rodwell, 4. Jeff Hardy, 5. Jason Moon, 6. Tony Smith, 7. Andy Gregory, 13. Ian Russell, 12. Les Morrisey, 11. Dean Hanson, 10. Michael Carberry, 9. Dean Schifilliti, 8. Chris Walsh (c) Reserves Cavill Heugh, Craig Keen, Michael Bolt, Trevor Kissell. Coach: Ron Hilditch.

| Date | Winner | Score | Loser | Score | Venue | Man of the Match |
|---|---|---|---|---|---|---|
| 7 June 1989 | Brisbane (Jackson, Kilroy, Backo, Miles tries, Matterson 3 goals) | 22 | Illawarra (Hampson, Wishart, Rodwell ties, Wishart 4 goals) | 20 | Parramatta Stadium | Andy Gregory – Illawarra |

The Broncos raced to a 16-0 lead and it seemed the Steelers' much more fancied opponents would run away with the game. But Illawarra hit back. Illawarra lost the match 22-20, however Brisbane scored a try off what appeared to be a forward pass. The large Illawarra contingent of the 16,968 strong crowd at Parramatta Stadium booed the Broncos after their win, with Brisbane captain Wally Lewis gaining their ire by gesturing back. Illawarra's performance inspired Australian folk singer John Williamson to write a song about the match.

=== Notes ===
- – advanced having scored the first try

+ – advanced on penalty countback

== Awards ==
=== Player of the series ===
- Terry Matterson (Brisbane)

=== Golden Try ===
- Glenn Ryan (Manly-Warringah)

== Sources ==
- https://web.archive.org/web/20070929092902/http://users.hunterlink.net.au/~maajjs/aus/nsw/sum/nsw1989.htm
