= Rugby League World Cup venues =

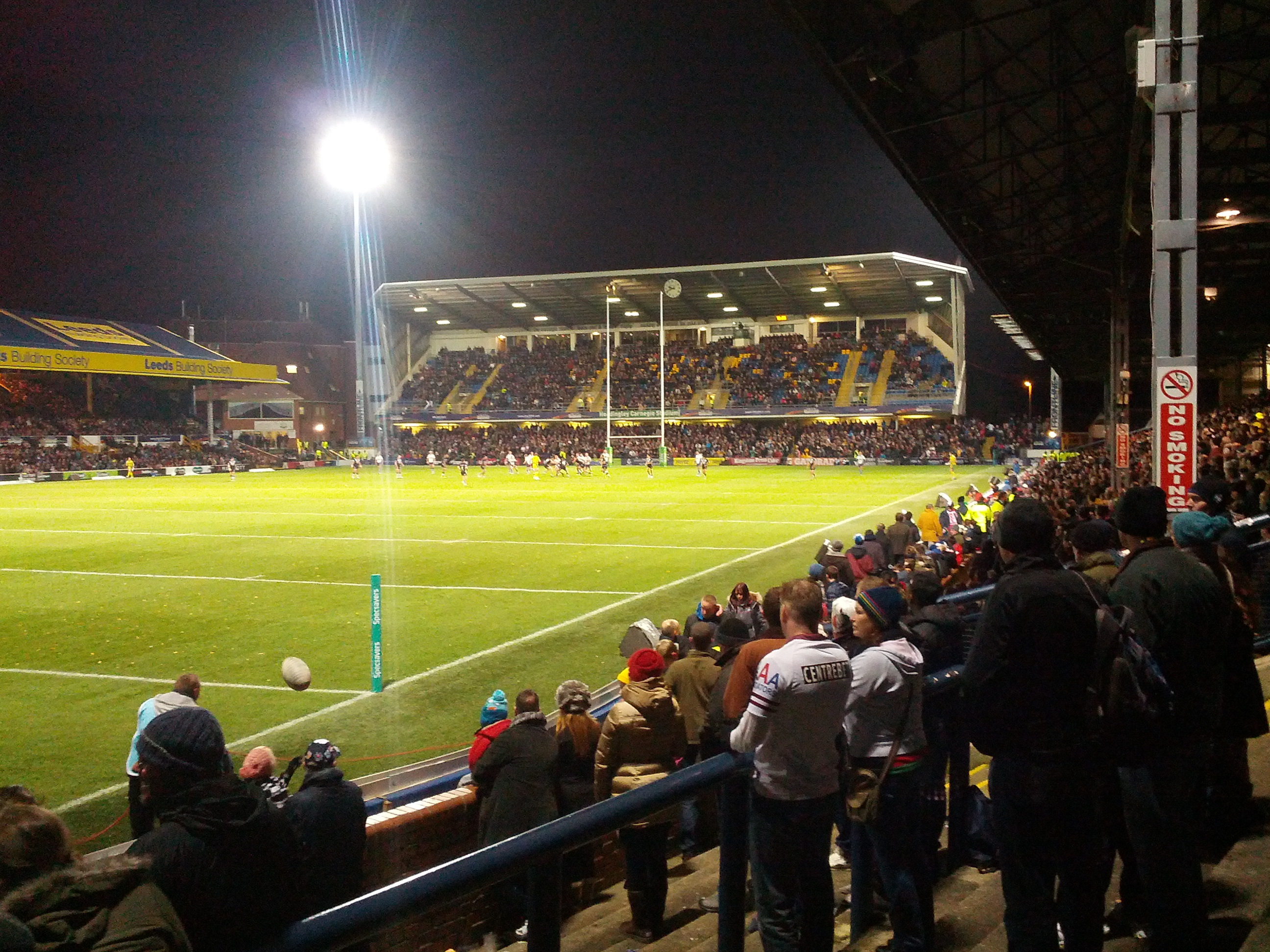
Headingley in Leeds and Lang Park in Brisbane have hosted games in eight Rugby League World Cups – the most of any venue

The following is a list of venues that have hosted matches in the Rugby League World Cup.

The first Rugby League World Cup was staged in France in 1954 with the last having been staged in Australia, New Zealand, and Papua New Guinea in 2026. The next one will be in 2030, hosted by the United States.

As of 2026, 17 Rugby League World Cups have been held since the inaugural event in 1954.

== Venues by tournament ==
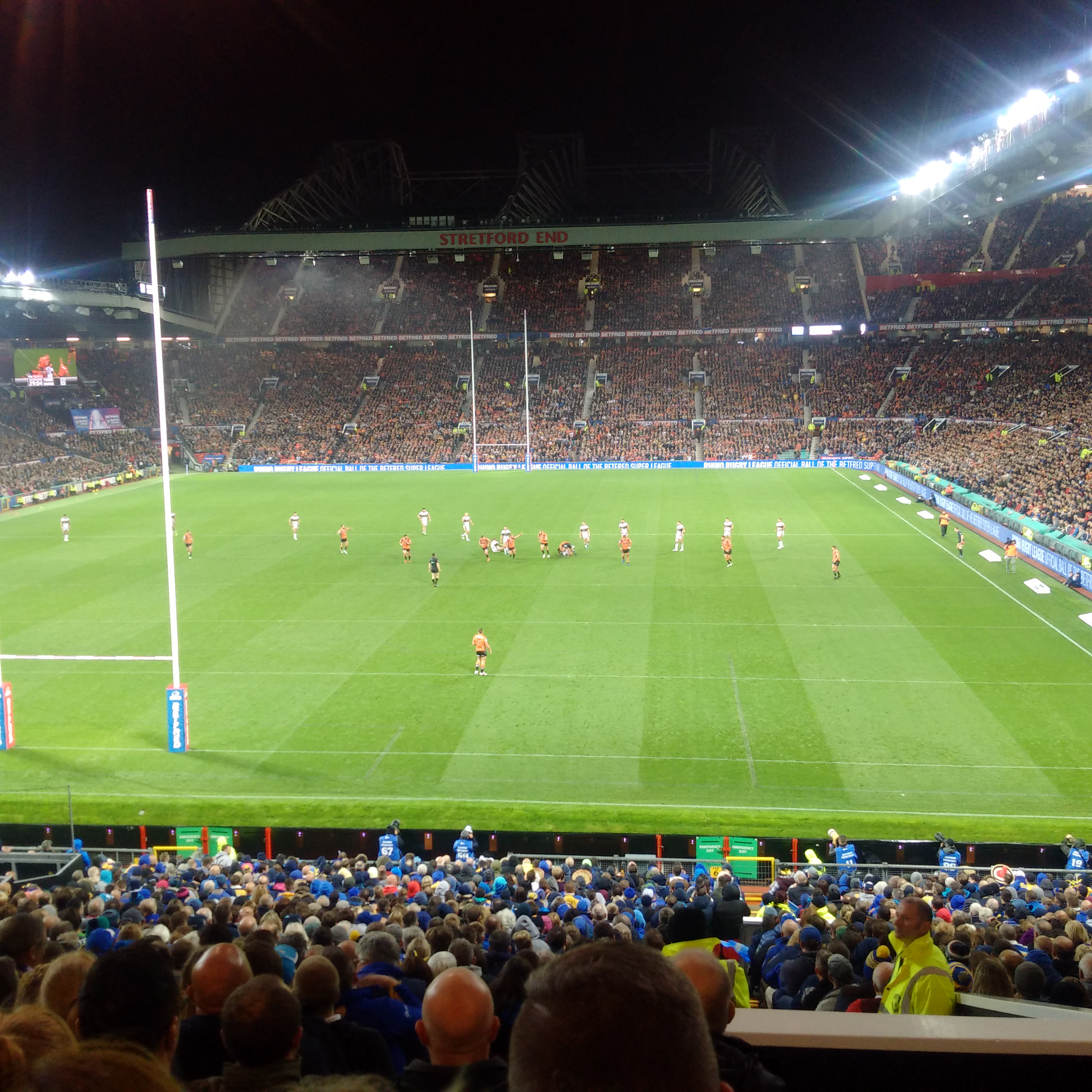
Old Trafford in Manchester has hosted the joint-most Rugby League World Cup finals alongside Lang Park – with three

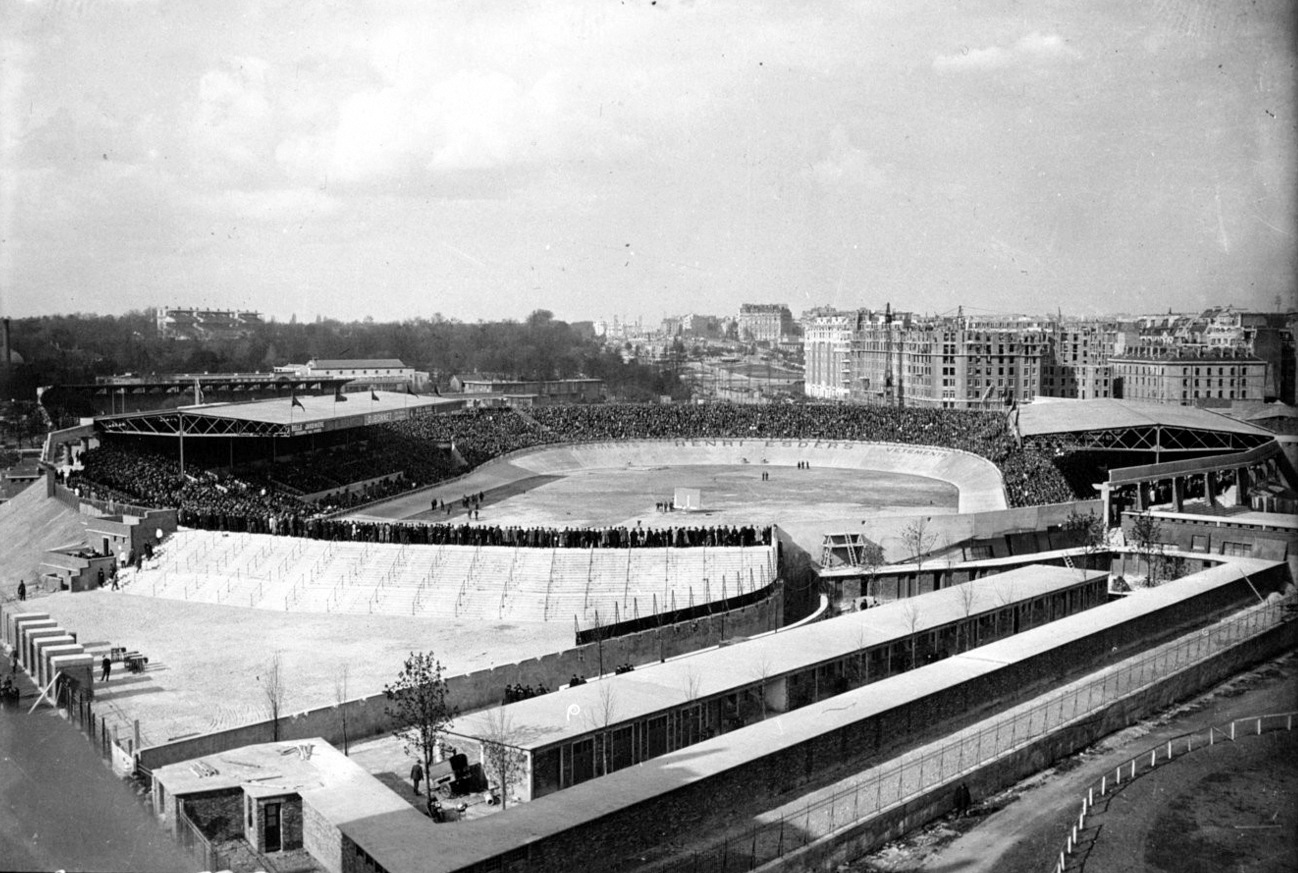
Parc des Princes in Paris hosted the first Rugby League World Cup Final in 1954

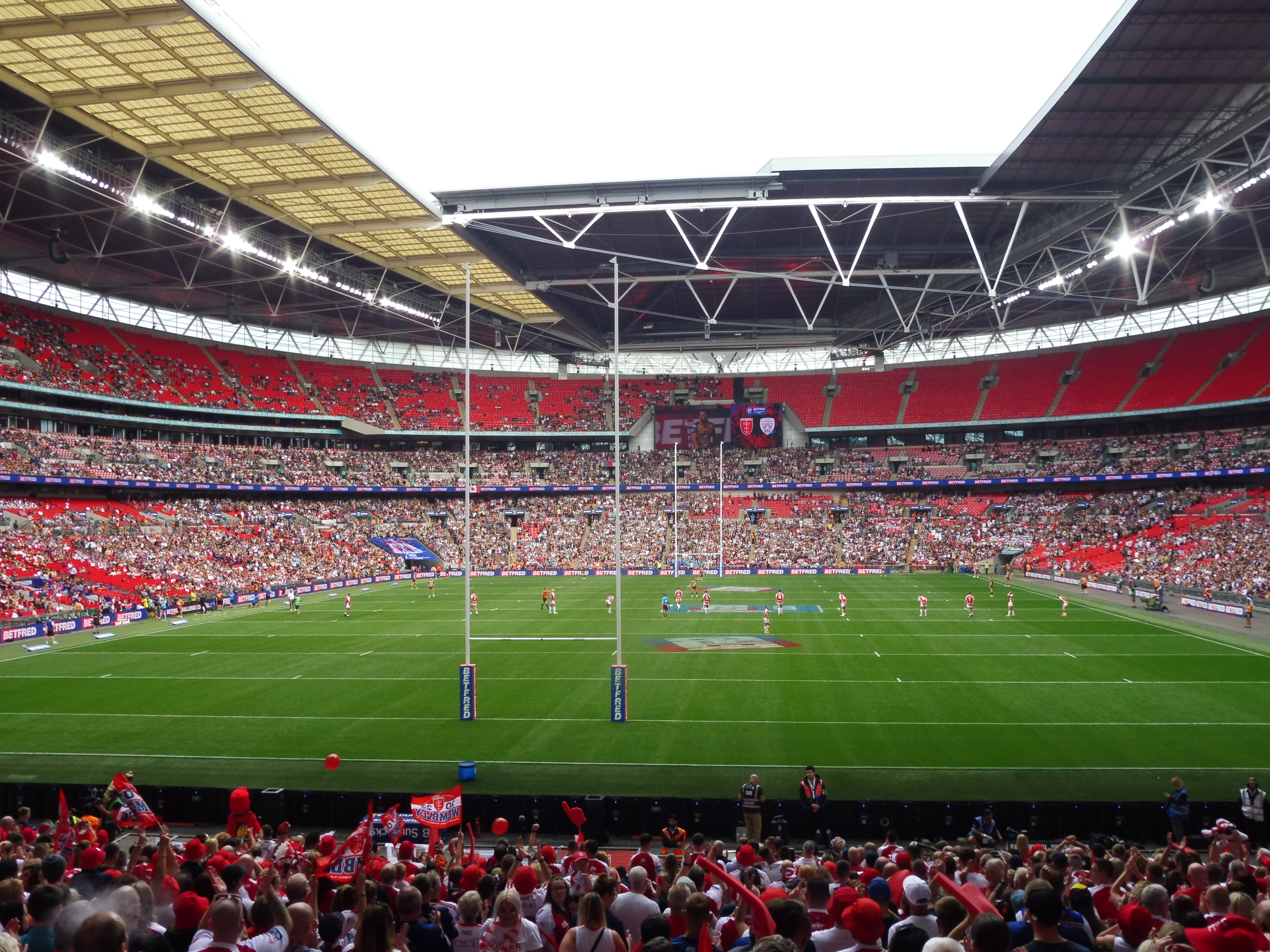
Wembley Stadium in London is the largest venue ever to be used in the Rugby League World Cup at 90,000 capacity – it hosted the 2013 semi-finals as a double header

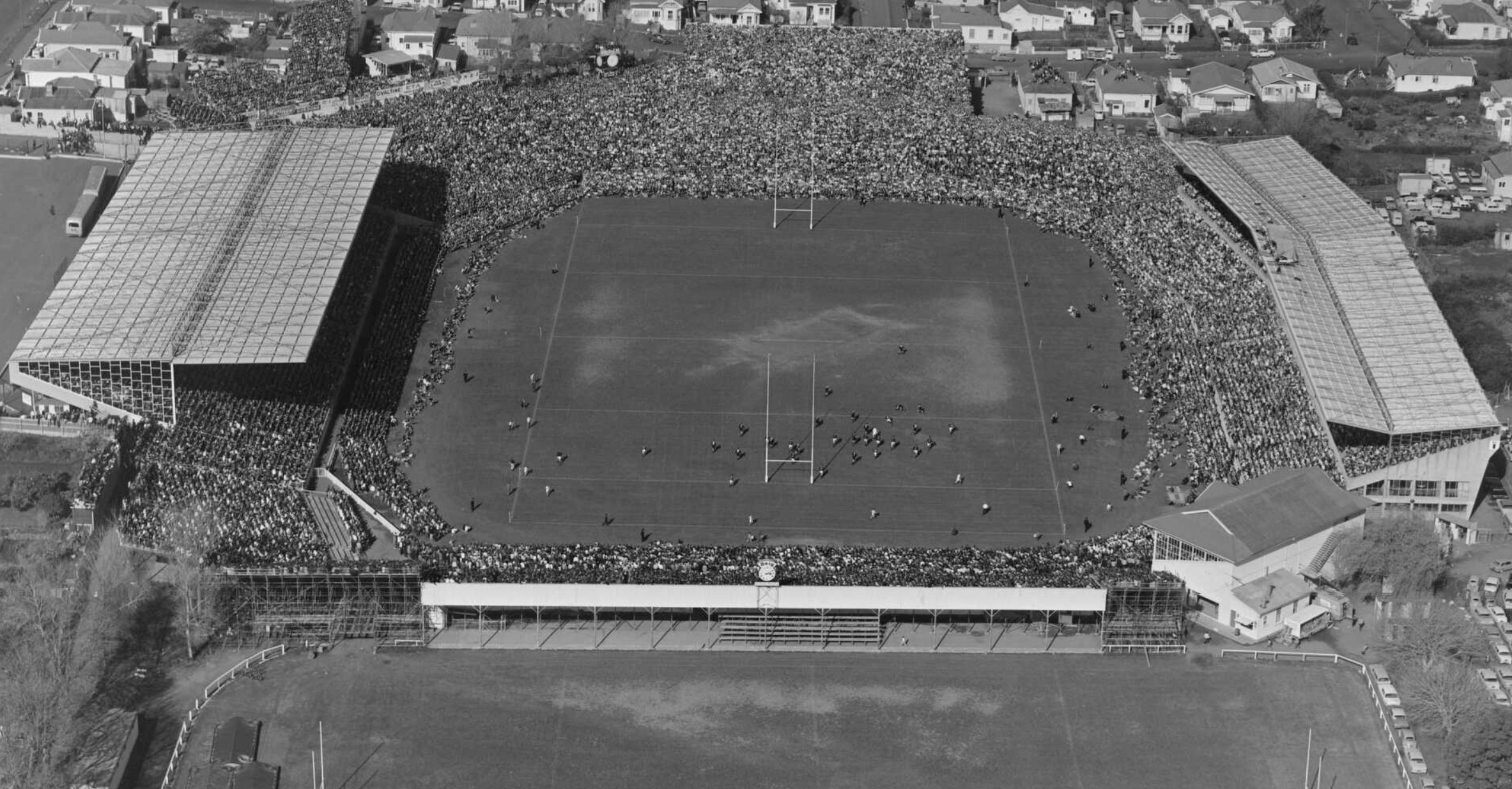
Eden Park in Auckland hosted the 1988 World Cup Final. To date this is the only time the Final has been held in New Zealand

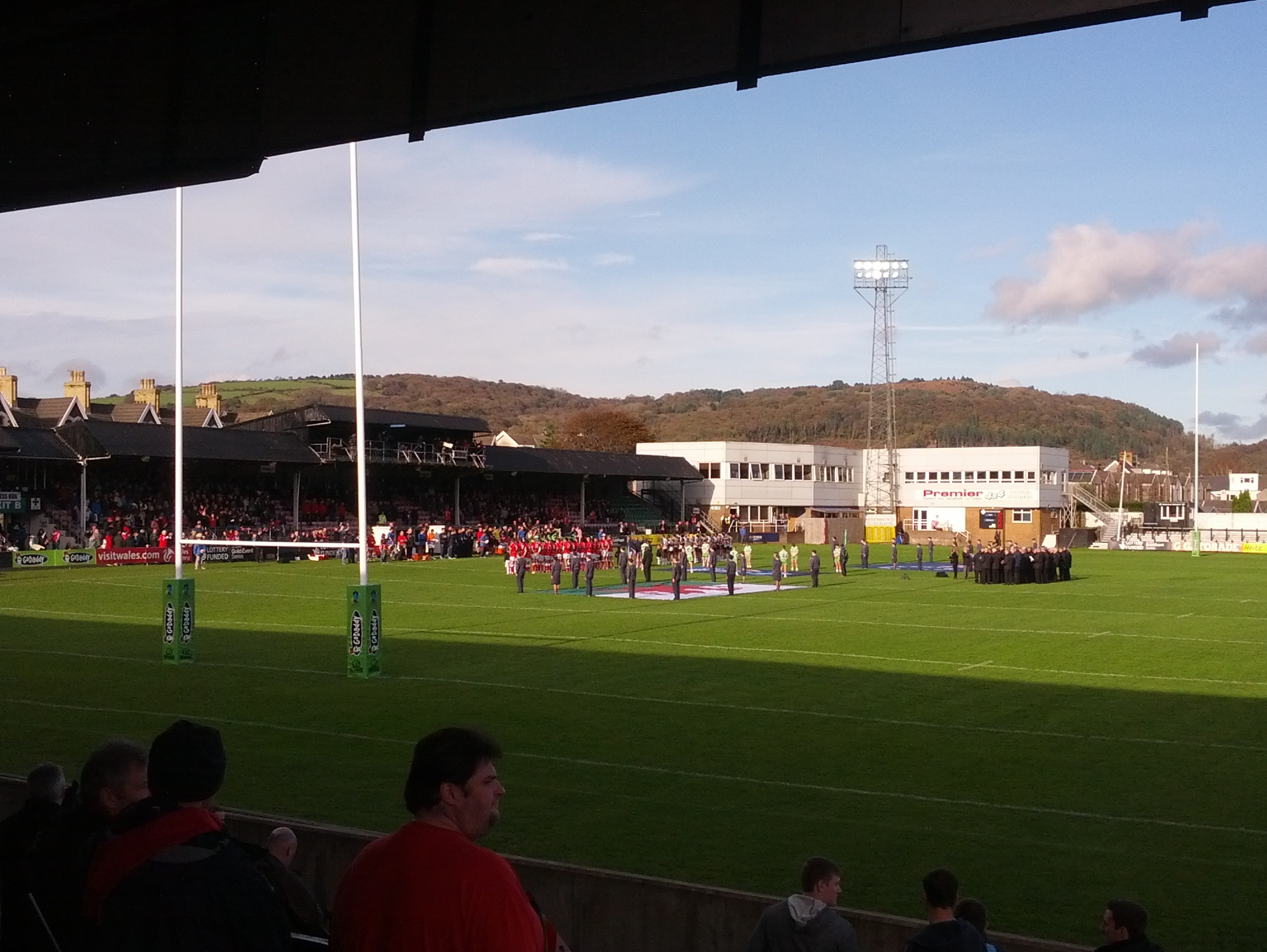
The Gnoll in Neath is the smallest venue ever to be used in the Rugby League World Cup at 6,000 capacity – it was used in 2013 for one group game

All countries are listed in alphabetical order, while all venues are listed in order of appearance and with their non-corporate name (unless unavoidable). Venue capacity is listed as it currently stands and may vary from the capacity of the venue at the time of use. For example, the Sydney Cricket Ground's current spectator capacity is 48,000 but stood at 70,000 when used as a World Cup venue from 1957 to 1977.

- Stadiums in **bold text** show Rugby League World Cup final hosts for that tournament.
- Stadiums in italic text show ground has been demolished as of 2024.
- Highest Attendance is the highest for that particular tournament.

=== France 1954 ===
City	Stadium	Capacity	Highest Attendance
**Paris**	**Parc des Princes**	**48,229**	**30,368**
Bordeaux	Stade Chaban Delmas	34,462	14,000
Lyon	Stade de Gerland	25,000	10,250
Marseille	Stade Vélodrome	67,394	20,000
Nantes	Stade Marcel Saupin	1,880	13,000
Toulouse	Stadium Municipal	33,150	37,471

=== Australia 1957 ===
City	Stadium	Capacity	Highest Attendance
Brisbane	Brisbane Cricket Ground	37,478	29,636
Sydney	Sydney Cricket Ground	48,000	58,655

=== United Kingdom 1960 ===
City	Stadium	Capacity	Highest Attendance
Bradford	Odsal Stadium	26,019	33,023
Leeds	Headingley	19,700	10,773
Swinton	Station Road	15,000	22,923
Wigan	Central Park	18,000	20,278

=== Australia and New Zealand 1968 ===
City	Stadium	Capacity	Highest Attendance
(Australia) **Sydney**	**Sydney Cricket Ground**	**48,000**	**62,256**
(Australia) Brisbane	Lang Park	52,500	32,664
(New Zealand) Auckland	Carlaw Park	17,000	18,000

=== United Kingdom 1970 ===
City	Stadium	Capacity	Highest Attendance
**Leeds**	**Headingley**	**19,700**	**18,776**
Bradford	Odsal Stadium	26,019	6,654
Castleford	Wheldon Road	10,500	8,958
Hull	The Boulevard	10,500	3,824
Swinton	Station Road	15,000	5,609
Wigan	Central Park	18,000	9,805

=== France 1972 ===
City	Stadium	Capacity	Highest Attendance
**Lyon**	**Stade de Gerland**	**25,000**	**4,231**
Grenoble	Stade Lesdiguières	12,000	5,321
Marseille	Stade Vélodrome	67,394	20,748
Paris	Parc des Princes	48,229	8,000
Pau	Stade du Hameau	14,588	7,500
Perpignan	Stade Gilbert Brutus	13,000	6,324
Toulouse	Stadium Municipal	33,150	10,332

=== Australia, France, New Zealand, and United Kingdom 1975 ===
City	Stadium	Capacity	Highest Attendance
**(England)** **Leeds**	**Headingley**	**19,700**	**10,842**
(Australia) Brisbane	Lang Park	52,500	12,000
(Australia) Sydney	Sydney Cricket Ground	48,000	33,858
(England) Bradford	Odsal Stadium	26,019	5,507
(England) Salford	The Willows	11,363	2,247
(England) Warrington	Wilderspool Stadium	9,200	5,034
(England) Wigan	Central Park	18,000	9,353
(France) Bordeaux	Stade Chaban Delmas	34,462	1,581
(France) Marseille	Stade Vélodrome	67,394	10,000
(France) Perpignan	Stade Gilbert Brutus	13,000	10,440
(France) Toulouse	Stadium Municipal	33,150	7,563
(New Zealand) Auckland	Carlaw Park	17,000	18,000
(New Zealand) Christchurch	Addington Showgrounds	18,000	2,500
(Wales) Swansea	St Helens Rugby Ground	4,500	11,112

=== Australia and New Zealand 1977 ===
City	Stadium	Capacity	Highest Attendance
(Australia) **Sydney**	**Sydney Cricket Ground**	**48,000**	**24,457**
(Australia) Brisbane	Lang Park	52,500	27,000
(New Zealand) Auckland	Carlaw Park	17,000	18,000
(New Zealand) Christchurch	Addington Showgrounds	18,000	9,000

=== International 1985–1988 ===
City	Stadium	Capacity	Highest Attendance
**(New Zealand)** **Auckland**	**Eden Park**	**50,000**	**47,363**
(Australia) Brisbane	Lang Park	52,500	22,811
(Australia) Sydney	Sydney Football Stadium	45,500	15,944
(Australia) Wagga Wagga	Eric Weissel Oval	10,000	11,685
(England) Leeds	Headingley	19,700	6,567
(England) Wigan	Central Park	18,000	20,169
(France) Avignon	Parc des Sports	17,518	4,000
(France) Carcassonne	Stade Albert Domec	10,000	5,000
(France) Perpignan	Stade Gilbert Brutus	13,000	5,000
(New Zealand) Auckland	Carlaw Park	17,000	15,327
(New Zealand) Christchurch	Addington Showgrounds	18,000	8,525
(Papua New Guinea) Port Moresby	Lloyd Robson Oval	14,800	17,000

=== International 1989–1992 ===
City	Stadium	Capacity	Highest Attendance
(England) **London**	**Old Wembley Stadium**	**82,000**	**73,631**
(Australia) Brisbane	Lang Park	52,500	32,313
(Australia) Parkes	Pioneer Oval	12,000	12,384
(Australia) Townsville	Townsville Sports Reserve	6,500	12,470
(England) Hull	The Boulevard	10,500	5,250
(England) Leeds	Elland Road	37,792	32,500
(England) Wigan	Central Park	18,000	20,346
(France) Carcassonne	Stade Albert Domec	10,000	4,208
(France) Perpignan	Stade Gilbert Brutus	13,000	3,965
(New Zealand) Auckland	Mount Smart Stadium	25,000	15,000
(New Zealand) Christchurch	Queen Elizabeth II Park	25,000	3,133
(New Zealand) Christchurch	Addington Showgrounds	18,000	2,000
(Papua New Guinea) Goroka	Danny Leahy Oval	13,000	11,485
(Papua New Guinea) Port Moresby	Lloyd Robson Oval	14,800	14,500

=== England 1995 ===
City	Stadium	Capacity	Highest Attendance
(England) **London**	**Old Wembley Stadium**	**82,000**	**66,540**
(England) Gateshead	Gateshead International Stadium	11,800	9,181
(England) Huddersfield	Kirklees Stadium	24,121	16,608
(England) Hull	The Boulevard	10,500	5,121
(England) Keighley	Cougar Park	7,800	4,845
(England) Leeds	Headingley	19,700	14,041
(England) Manchester	Old Trafford	55,000	30,042
(England) St. Helens	Knowsley Road	17,500	8,679
(England) Warrington	Wilderspool Stadium	9,200	8,083
(England) Wigan	Central Park	18,000	26,263
(Wales) Cardiff	Ninian Park	21,508	10,250
(Wales) Swansea	Vetch Field	11,475	15,385

=== England, France, Ireland, Scotland, and Wales 2000 ===
City	Stadium	Capacity	Highest Attendance
(England) **Manchester**	**Old Trafford**	**68,217**	**44,329**
(England) Bolton	Reebok Stadium	28,723	16,032
(England) Castleford	Wheldon Road	10,500	5,158
(England) Gateshead	Gateshead International Stadium	11,800	9,181
(England) Gloucester	Kingsholm Stadium	16,115	2,496
(England) Hull	Craven Park	12,225	2,187
(England) Hull	The Boulevard	10,500	3,044
(England) Huddersfield	McAlpine Stadium	24,121	8,144
(England) Leeds	Headingley	19,700	15,405
(England) London	Twickenham Stadium	82,000	33,758
(England) Reading	Madejski Stadium	24,161	3,982
(England) St. Helens	Knowsley Road	17,500	5,736
(England) Watford	Vicarage Road	22,220	5,404
(England) Widnes	Halton Stadium	13,350	5,211
(England) Workington	Derwent Park	10,000	4,107
(Scotland) Edinburgh	Tynecastle Stadium	19,852	1,579
(Scotland) Glasgow	Firhill Stadium	10,102	2,008
(Wales) Cardiff	Millennium Stadium	73,931	17,612
(Wales) Llanelli	Stradey Park	10,800	1,497
(Wales) Wrexham	Racecourse Ground	13,341	5,016
(Ireland) Dublin	Tolka Park	5,700	1,782
(Northern Ireland) Belfast	Windsor Park	18,500	3,207
(France) Albi	Stadium Municipal d'Albi	13,058	7,969
(France) Carcassonne	Stade Albert Domec	10,000	10,288
(France) Paris	Stade Sébastien Charléty	20,000	7,498
(France) Toulouse	Stadium Municipal	33,150	4,313

=== Australia 2008 ===
City	Stadium	Capacity	Highest Attendance
**Brisbane**	**Lang Park**	**52,500**	**50,599**
Canberra	Canberra Stadium	25,011	9,827
Gold Coast	Robina Stadium	27,690	11,278
Gosford	Central Coast Stadium	20,059	9,720
Melbourne	Docklands Stadium	56,347	36,297
Newcastle	Newcastle International Sports Centre	30,000	15,145
Rockhampton	Browne Park	8,000	5,930
Sydney	Parramatta Stadium	20,741	8,067
Sydney	Penrith Stadium	22,500	11,787
Sydney	Sydney Football Stadium	45,500	34,157
Townsville	Willows Sports Complex	26,500	16,239
Wollongong	Wollongong Showground	23,750	9,213

=== England and Wales 2013 ===
City	Stadium	Capacity	Highest Attendance
(England) **Manchester**	**Old Trafford**	**74,310**	**74,468**
(England) Bristol	Memorial Stadium	11,000	7,247
(England) Halifax	The Shay	10,401	10,266
(England) Huddersfield	Kirklees Stadium	24,121	24,375
(England) Hull	Craven Park	12,225	7,481
(England) Hull	Hull City Stadium	25,586	25,114
(England) Leeds	Headingley	19,700	18,180
(England) Leigh	Leigh Sports Village	12,000	10,554
(England) London	Wembley Stadium	90,000	67,545
(England) Rochdale	Spotland Stadium	10,249	8,872
(England) Salford	City of Salford Stadium	12,000	6,041
(England) St. Helens	Langtree Park	18,000	14,137
(England) Wigan	Wigan Athletic Stadium	25,138	22,276
(England) Warrington	Halliwell Jones Stadium	15,300	14,965
(England) Workington	Derwent Park	10,000	7,630
(Wales) Cardiff	Millennium Stadium	73,931	45,052
(Wales) Neath	The Gnoll	6,000	3,270
(Wales) Wrexham	Racecourse Ground	13,341	8,019
(France) Avignon	Parc des Sports	17,518	17,518
(France) Perpignan	Stade Gilbert Brutus	13,000	11,576
(Ireland) Limerick	Thomond Park	25,600	5,021

- Although the competition was officially co hosted by England and Wales, France and Ireland also hosted games.

=== Australia, New Zealand, and Papua New Guinea 2017 ===
City	Stadium	Capacity	Highest Attendance
(Australia) **Brisbane**	**Lang Park**	**52,500**	**40,033**
(Australia) Cairns	Barlow Park	16,700	9,216
(Australia) Canberra	Canberra Stadium	25,011	12,293
(Australia) Darwin	Marrara Oval	12,500	13,473
(Australia) Melbourne	Melbourne Rectangular Stadium	30,050	22,724
(Australia) Perth	Perth Rectangular Stadium	20,500	14,744
(Australia) Sydney	Sydney Football Stadium	45,500	21,127
(Australia) Townsville	Willows Sports Complex	26,500	7,732
(New Zealand) Auckland	Mount Smart Stadium	25,000	30,003
(New Zealand) Christchurch	Rugby League Park	18,000	12,130
(New Zealand) Hamilton	Waikato Stadium	25,800	24,041
(New Zealand) Wellington	Wellington Regional Stadium	34,500	12,713
(Papua New Guinea) Port Moresby	National Football Stadium	14,800	14,800

=== England 2021 ===
City	Stadium	Capacity	Highest Attendance
**Manchester**	**Old Trafford**	**74,310**	**67,502**
London	Ashburton Grove	60,704	40,489
Newcastle	St James’ Park	52,350	43,199
Leeds	Elland Road	37,792	28,113
Middlesbrough	Riverside Stadium	34,742	8,342
Coventry	Coventry Arena	32,753	10,276
Sheffield	Bramall Lane	32,050	18,760
Bolton	Bolton Stadium	28,723	23,648
Hull	Hull City Stadium	25,586	7,080
Wigan	Wigan Athletic Stadium	25,138	23,179
Huddersfield	Kirklees Stadium	24,121	24,375
Leeds	Headingley Stadium	19,700	13,366
St Helens	Langtree Park	18,000	14,137
Doncaster	Keepmoat Stadium	15,231	6,968
Warrington	Halliwell Jones Stadium	15,200	14,965
Leigh	Leigh Sports Village	12,000	6,057
Newcastle	Kingston Park	10,200	6,736

=== Australia, New Zealand and Papua New Guinea 2026 ===
City	Stadium	Capacity	Highest Attendance
(Australia) **Brisbane**	**Lang Park**	**52,500**	**52,461**
(Australia) Gold Coast	Robina Stadium	27,400	23,659
(Australia) Newcastle	Newcastle International Sports Centre	33,000	29,712
(Australia) Perth	Perth Rectangular Stadium	20,500	18,302
(Australia) Sydney	Sydney Football Stadium	42,500	41,529
(Australia) Sydney	Western Sydney Stadium	30,000	29,411
(Australia) Townsville	North Queensland Stadium	25,455	19,172
(Australia) Wollongong	Wollongong Showground	23,750	15,063
(New Zealand) Christchurch	Te Kaha	25,000	24,868
(Papua New Guinea) Port Moresby	National Football Stadium	14,800	15,008

== Venues by nation ==
=== Australia ===
City	Stadium	Capacity	Highest Attendance	Years
Brisbane	Brisbane Cricket Ground	37,478	29,636	1957
Sydney	Sydney Cricket Ground	48,000	62,256	1957, 1968, 1975, 1977
Brisbane	Lang Park	52,500	52,461	1968, 1975, 1977, 1985–88, 1989–92, 2008, 2017, 2026
Sydney	Sydney Football Stadium (old)	45,500	34,157	1985–88, 2008, 2017
Wagga Wagga	Eric Weissel Oval	10,000	11,685	1985–88
Parkes	Pioneer Oval	12,000	12,384	1989–92
Townsville	Townsville Sports Reserve	6,500	12,470	1989–92
Canberra	Canberra Stadium	25,011	12,293	2008, 2017
Gold Coast	Robina Stadium	27,690	23,659	2008, 2026
Gosford	Central Coast Stadium	20,059	9,720	2008
Melbourne	Docklands Stadium	56,347	36,297	2008
Newcastle	Newcastle International Sports Centre	30,000	29,712	2008, 2026
Rockhampton	Browne Park	8,000	5,942	2008
Sydney	Parramatta Stadium	20,741	8,602	2008
Sydney	Penrith Stadium	22,500	11,787	2008
Townsville	Willows Sports Complex	26,500	16,239	2008, 2017
Wollongong	Wollongong Showground	23,750	15,063	2008, 2026
Cairns	Barlow Park	16,700	9,216	2017
Darwin	Marrara Oval	12,500	13,473	2017
Melbourne	Melbourne Rectangular Stadium	30,050	22,724	2017
Perth	Perth Rectangular Stadium	20,500	18,302	2017, 2026
Sydney	Sydney Football Stadium (new)	42,500	41,529	2026
Sydney	Western Sydney Stadium	30,000	29,411	2026
Townsville	North Queensland Stadium	25,455	19,172	2026

=== England ===
City	Stadium	Capacity	Highest Attendance	Years
Bradford	Odsal Stadium	26,019	33,023	1960, 1970, 1975
Leeds	Headingley	19,700	22,209	1960, 1970, 1975*, 1985–88, 1989–92, 1995, 2000, 2013, 2021
Swinton	Station Road	15,000	22,923	1960, 1970
Wigan	Central Park	18,000	26,263	1960, 1970, 1975, 1985–88, 1989–92, 1995
Castleford	Wheldon Road	10,500	8,958	1970, 2000
Hull	The Boulevard	10,500	5,250	1970, 1989–92, 1995, 2000
Salford	The Willows	11,363	2,247	1975
Warrington	Wilderspool Stadium	9,200	8,083	1975, 1995
London	Wembley Stadium (1923)	82,000	73,631	1989–92, 1995
Leeds	Elland Road	37,792	32,500	1989–92, 2021
Gateshead	Gateshead International Stadium	11,800	9,181	1995, 2000
Huddersfield	Kirklees Stadium	24,121	24,375	1995, 2000, 2013, 2021
Keighley	Cougar Park	7,800	4,845	1995
Manchester	Old Trafford	74,310	74,468	1995, 2000, 2013, 2021
St. Helens	Knowsley Road	17,500	8,679	1995, 2000
Bolton	Bolton Stadium	28,723	23,648	2000, 2021
Gloucester	Kingsholm Stadium	16,115	2,496	2000
Hull	Craven Park	12,225	7,481	2000
London	Twickenham Stadium	82,000	33,758	2000
Reading	Madejski Stadium	24,161	3,982	2000
Watford	Vicarage Road	22,220	5,404	2000
Widnes	Halton Stadium	13,350	5,211	2000
Workington	Derwent Park	10,000	7,630	2000, 2013
Bristol	Memorial Stadium	11,000	7,247	2013
Halifax	The Shay	10,401	10,266	2013
Hull	MKM Stadium	25,586	25,114	2013, 2021
Leigh	Leigh Sports Village	12,000	10,554	2013, 2021
London	Wembley Stadium	90,000	67,545	2013
Salford	City of Salford Stadium	12,000	6,041	2013
St. Helens	Langtree Park	18,000	14,137	2013, 2021
Warrington	Halliwell Jones Stadium	15,300	14,965	2013, 2021
Wigan	Wigan Athletic Stadium	25,138	23,179	2013, 2021
London	Ashburton Grove	60,704	40,489	2021
Newcastle	St James' Park	52,350	43,199	2021
Middlesbrough	Riverside Stadium	34,742	8,342	2021
Coventry	Coventry Arena	32,753	10,276	2021
Sheffield	Bramall Lane	32,050	18,760	2021
Doncaster	Keepmoat Stadium	15,231	6,968	2021
Newcastle	Kingston Park	10,200	6,736	2021

* 1975 had no official World Cup Final. Instead a special challenge match was played.

=== France ===
City	Stadium	Capacity	Highest Attendance	Years
Paris	Parc des Princes	48,229	30,368	1954, 1972
Lyon	Stade de Gerland	25,000	10,250	1954, 1972
Bordeaux	Stade Chaban Delmas	34,462	14,000	1954, 1975
Marseille	Stade Vélodrome	67,394	20,748	1954, 1972, 1975
Nantes	Stade Marcel Saupin	1,880	13,000	1954
Toulouse	Stadium Municipal	33,150	37,471	1954, 1972, 1975, 2000
Grenoble	Stade Lesdiguières	12,000	5,321	1972
Pau	Stade du Hameau	14,588	7,500	1972
Perpignan	Stade Gilbert Brutus	13,000	11,576	1972, 1975, 1985–88, 1989–92, 2013
Avignon	Parc des Sports	17,518	17,518	1985–88, 2013
Carcassonne	Stade Albert Domec	10,000	10,288	1985–88, 1989–92, 2000
Albi	Stadium Municipal d'Albi	13,058	7,969	2000
Paris	Stade Sébastien Charléty	20,000	7,498	2000

=== Ireland ===
City	Stadium	Capacity	Highest Attendance	Years
Dublin	Tolka Park	5,700	1,782	2000
Limerick	Thomond Park	25,600	5,021	2013

=== New Zealand ===
City	Stadium	Capacity	Highest Attendance	Years
Auckland	Carlaw Park	17,000	18,000	1968, 1975, 1977, 1985–88
Christchurch	Addington Showground*	18,000	12,130	1975, 1977, 1985–88, 1989–92, 2017
Auckland	Eden Park	50,000	47,363	1985–88
Christchurch	Queen Elizabeth II Park	25,000	3,133	1989–92
Auckland	Mount Smart Stadium	25,000	30,003	1989–92, 2017
Hamilton	Waikato Stadium	25,800	24,041	2017
Wellington	Wellington Regional Stadium	34,500	12,713	2017
Christchurch	Te Kaha	25,000	24,868	2026

- Addington Showgrounds became Rugby League Park in 1997

=== Northern Ireland ===
City	Stadium	Capacity	Highest Attendance	Years
Belfast	Windsor Park	18,500	3,207	2000

=== Papua New Guinea ===
City	Stadium	Capacity	Highest Attendance	Years
Port Moresby	National Football Stadium*	14,800	17,000	1985–88, 1989–92, 2017, 2026
Goroka	Danny Leahy Oval	13,000	11,485	1989–92

- Lloyd Robson Oval was redeveloped into PNG's National Football Stadium in 2015.

=== Scotland ===
City	Stadium	Capacity	Highest Attendance	Years
Edinburgh	Tynecastle Stadium	19,852	1,579	2000
Glasgow	Firhill Stadium	10,102	2,008	2000

=== Wales ===
City	Stadium	Capacity	Highest Attendance	Years
Swansea	St Helens Rugby Ground	4,500	11,112	1975
Cardiff	Ninian Park	21,508	10,250	1995
Swansea	Vetch Field	11,475	15,385	1995
Cardiff	Millennium Stadium	73,931	45,052	2000, 2013
Llanelli	Stradey Park	10,800	1,497	2000
Wrexham	Racecourse Ground	13,341	8,019	2000, 2013
Neath	The Gnoll	6,000	3,270	2013

== See also ==
- List of Rugby League World Cup finals
- List of rugby league competitions
- List of rugby league stadiums by capacity
