= Ben Duckworth =

Australian rugby league footballer

Personal information
- Born: 23 September 1974 (age 50); Sydney, New South Wales

Playing information
- Position: Five-eighth, Lock
Club
| Years | Team | Pld | T | G | FG | P |
|---|---|---|---|---|---|---|
| 1993–95 | Illawarra Steelers | 12 | 1 | 0 | 0 | 4 |
| 1996–97 | Sydney Roosters | 11 | 2 | 0 | 0 | 8 |
| 1998–99 | Balmain Tigers | 29 | 5 | 0 | 0 | 20 |
| 2000 | Wests Tigers | 13 | 2 | 0 | 0 | 8 |
| 2001 | Parramatta Eels | 2 | 1 | 0 | 0 | 4 |
| | Total | 67 | 11 | 0 | 0 | 44 |

Ben Duckworth (born 23 September 1974) is a former professional rugby league footballer who played for the Illawarra Steelers, Eastern Suburbs, Balmain Tigers, Wests Tigers and Parramatta Eels.

== Playing career ==
Duckworth made his first grade debut for Illawarra against North Sydney in Round 21 1993. In 1996, Duckworth joined Eastern Suburbs which is now known as the Sydney Roosters. After 2 seasons at Easts, Duckworth joined Balmain and spent 2 years at the club and played for them in their last ever season as a first grade side.

In 2000, Duckworth was one of the few Balmain players signed by the newly formed Wests Tigers which was a merger between Balmain and fellow foundation club Western Suburbs.

In 2001, Duckworth joined Parramatta and played 2 games in their record breaking season as they finished as minor premiers. Duckworth did not play in any finals games or the grand final itself.
