= Peter Johnston (rugby league, born 1968) =

Australian rugby league footballer

Personal information
- Born: 25 February 1968 (age 57)

Playing information
- Position: Prop, Second-row
Club
Years	Team	Pld	T	G	FG	P
1989–91	Parramatta Eels	39	3	0	0	12
1992–93	South Sydney	33	3	0	0	12
1994–95	Illawarra Steelers	31	4	0	0	16
1996–97	Parramatta Eels	30	4	0	0	16
	Total	133	14	0	0	56

Peter Johnston (born 25 February 1968) is an Australian former professional rugby league footballer who played for the Parramatta Eels, South Sydney Rabbitohs and Illawarra Steelers in the NSWRL/ARL.

== Playing career ==
A prop known for his big hits, Johnston started his first-grade career at Parramatta in 1989. After three seasons with the Eels he had two-season stints at South Sydney and Illawarra, before finishing his career back at Parramatta.

His last first-grade appearance, a loss to North Sydney in the 1997 finals series, was the only final he played in his 133-game career.

== Post playing ==
Johnston now runs a Subway franchise in Wollongong.
