= Pioneer Oval =

Sports venue in Parkes, New South Wales

- Interactive map of Pioneer Oval
- Location: Parkes, New South Wales
- Coordinates: 33°7′46″S 148°10′58″E
- Capacity: 12,000
- Surface: Grass

Tenants
- Parkes Spacemen (Group 11); Parkes Boars (Rugby Union)

Pioneer Oval is located in the town of Parkes, New South Wales, Australia. It was carved out of a hill in eastern Parkes during the depression years and has evolved into one of country New South Wales' premier sporting arenas, playing host to major local, regional, national and international sporting events.

== History ==
In 1892 a start was made to clear around 1,500 tree stumps and begin development of The People's Park, a reserve of 81 acres in the general Pioneer Oval / Spicer Park area of Parkes today. The area was slowly developed during the great depression years and beyond to level out the playing surface and add three levels of tiered parking to further improve the spectator viewing from cars parked around the ground.

In a match between Northern and Southern Zones in April 1953, the Parkes First Grade Coach, Ken Arthurson AM, was badly injured. He was later to spend three months in hospital recuperating from a fractured skull and never played Rugby League again. Ken Arthurson went on to be one of Rugby League's greatest administrators, rising to become Chairman of the Australian Rugby League from 1984 to 1997.

Prior to 1963, there were no amenities available at the ground. Teams were required to use the amenities under the grandstand at Spicer Oval, which was over. In 1963 G.C McCabe won the contract to build the dressing rooms and kiosk at a cost of 11,900 pounds. It was named the Charles Dwyer Pavilion and was opened by the Mayor of Parkes, Ald. A.C. Moon. The Pavilion featured two upstairs dressing rooms, a downstairs dressing room and storage area and a canteen facility, which became known as the 'Main Canteen'. The opening coincided with the touring New Zealand Rugby League match in Parkes. In 1969 the Parkes Rugby League, using its own funds and with approval from the Parkes Shire Council, built another kiosk to the south of the Charles Dwyer Pavilion. This kiosk became known as the 'Long Canteen'.

In 1976, the Parkes Sports Council managed a $20,000 project to install flood lighting around the ground. The project involved months of planning and construction work by Ron Harrison, Don 'Bunda' Fletcher, and Lloyd 'Gerry' Collins, all done on a voluntary basis and with the assistance the Central West County Council, which was the electricity authority at the time. In 1986 an underground, automatic watering system was installed at Pioneer Oval and Spicer Park with funds provided by the Parkes Sports Council and the NSW Department of Sport and Recreation.

The Parkes Rugby League Football Club obtained a Footy TAB grant in 1987 to change the ground from an oval to a rectangular shape. New fencing was installed around the playing area and the existing grandstands were moved in closer to the field. These changes greatly improved the spectator viewing of matches by allowing the crowd to be nearer to the action. The Australian Rugby League Chairman at the time, Mr Ken Arthurson officially opened the redeveloped ground in 1988, marking the conclusion of the project. The changes to the ground brought the facility into line with guidelines set down for hosting major Rugby League matches. As a result, Parkes was allocated the first of many top class matches, a Panasonic Cup match in early 1989. The Brisbane Broncos and the Canberra Raiders before a crowd of over 10,000 and the conduct of the match received high praise from the NSW Rugby League as the most successful Cup match held in country NSW.

In 1990 a security perimeter fence was erected around the facility and a public entry gateway was built by volunteer labour. The spectator banks were further improved to increase the ground capacity and a cover was erected over the grandstands, with modular seating added for spectator comfort. The Parkes Sports Council, with the help of grant funding and a loan from Parkes Shire Council, erected six corporate boxes and a media box above the existing grandstands in 1992. Telstra installed a fibre optic cable and a camera viewing platform was added above the media box to improve the facilities for media coverage.

An attempt was made to rename the ground 'Ken Arthurson Field' to reflect the fact that the ground was no longer an oval shape and to recognise the important influence that Ken had on the allocation of major rugby league matches to Pioneer Oval. However, the community had a long affiliation with the playing field and were not convinced of the need to change its name.

An electronic scoreboard was first added in 1997 and was subsequently replaced with a larger board in 2011 after the original board became faulty. The lighting system, which was first installed in 1976, was upgraded in 2003 using lights from the Parramatta Stadium. These lights were provided to Parkes Shire Council by the Parramatta Stadium Trust at a substantially reduced price.

In 2006 the dressing room facilities, first built in 1963, were refurbished and the internal roads were upgraded for a total cost of $120,000. The existing kiosk in the Charles Dwyer Pavilion was enclosed and incorporated into the upstairs dressing rooms, while a referees change room was included in the changes. With the removal of the main canteen, there was now a need to improve the facilities in the ageing long canteen. An extension to the East of the Long Canteen was added and the facilities were upgraded.

== Pioneer Oval Today ==
The oval, is part of a major multipurpose sporting precinct, which includes Spicer Park to the south and Northparkes oval to the north. The Parkes Spacemen Junior and Senior Rugby League Football clubs are based at the ground. The innovative club name of the 'Spacemen' drew it inspiration from the CSIRO Parkes Radio Telescope, which is located to the north of Parkes. The name was also recognised during the 100 year celebrations of rugby league by being listed in the article 100 Reasons Why People Love Rugby League, which appeared in the Sydney Morning Herald.

In June 2014 Parkes Shire Council resolved to name the main playing field 'Jock Colley Field' in honour of former long serving Country Rugby League President, Jock Colley who died earlier that year.

== Notable rugby league games ==
Date	Result	Attendance	Notes
1 March 1989	Brisbane Broncos def. Canberra Raiders 18 – 13	NA	1989 Panasonic Cup Qualifying Round
18 February 1990	Balmain Tigers def. South Sydney Rabbitohs 17 – 12	NA	Channel 10 Challenge Cup
18 February 1990	Canberra Raiders def. Illawarra Steelers 20 – 14	NA	Channel 10 Challenge Cup
27 June 1990	Australia def. France 36 – 14	12,384	Played as part of 1989-92 Rugby League World Cup
16 June 1992	Great Britain def. NSW Country 24 – 6	8,014	Played as part of 1992 Great Britain Lions tour of Australasia
18 February 1994	Brisbane Broncos def. North Sydney Bears 26 – 12	NA	1994 Tooheys Challenge Cup
18 February 1994	Illawarra Steelers def. Canberra Raiders 18 – 12	NA	1994 Tooheys Challenge Cup
16 May 1998	Parramatta Eels def. Adelaide Rams 10 – 2	7,514	1998 NRL season Round 10
2002	Cronulla-Sutherland Sharks vs Parramatta Eels	10,490	2002 NRL season trial game
2005	Parkes Spacemen vs Newtown Jets	11,362	
2005	Parramatta Eels vs Sydney Roosters	11,362	2005 NRL season trial game
