= David Walsh (rugby league) =

Australian rugby league footballer

Personal information
- Full name: David Walsh
- Born: 6 September 1970 (age 54); Wollongong, New South Wales, Australia

Playing information
- Position: Prop
Club
Years	Team	Pld	T	G	FG	P
1990–98	Illawarra Steelers	114	6	0	0	24
- Source: As of 10 June 2019

David Walsh (born 6 September 1970) is an Australian former professional rugby league footballer who played in the 1990s. He played his entire career for the Illawarra Steelers in the New South Wales Rugby League (NSWRL) competition.

== Playing career ==
Walsh made his first grade debut for Illawarra against Eastern Suburbs in Round 16 1990 at Henson Park in front of 2600 spectators.

In 1992, Walsh played 22 games for Illawarra as the club made their first ever finals appearance. Walsh played in all of the club's finals matches including their 4-0 defeat against St George in the preliminary final. The loss was hard to take for Illawarra as they had beaten St George 18-16 just two weeks earlier in the qualifying final. Illawarra did finish the season with a trophy however as they defeated the Brisbane Broncos 4-2 in the Tooheys Challenge Cup which was a pre-season tournament that started before the commencement of the official competition.

Walsh played with Illawarra until the end of 1998 which would prove to be their final season in the top grade. Walsh played in the club's final ever game against Canterbury-Bankstown in Round 24 1998 which ended in a 25-24 loss. Shortly afterwards it was announced that Illawarra were to form a joint venture with St George but Walsh was one of the players not offered a contract to play with the new team.

== Post playing ==
In 2008, Walsh coached the Shellharbour City Dragons who were formerly known as the Shellharbour City Marlins.
