= Chris Walsh (rugby league) =

Australian rugby league footballer

Personal information
- Born: 5 June 1962 (age 62); Port Kembla, New South Wales, Australia
- Height: 188 cm (6 ft 2 in)
- Weight: 101 kg (15 st 13 lb)

Playing information
- Position: Second-row
Club
Years	Team	Pld	T	G	FG	P
1982–86	St. George Dragons	88	12	0	0	45
1987–92	Illawarra Steelers	79	0	0	0	0
	Total	167	12	0	0	45
Representative
Years	Team	Pld	T	G	FG	P
1984	New South Wales	1	0	0	0	0

Chris Walsh (born 5 June 1962) is an Australian former professional rugby league footballer who played in the 1980s and 1990s. A New South Wales State of Origin forward, he played club football for the St. George Dragons and Illawarra Steelers.

== Playing career ==
As a 19-year-old in 1981, Walsh moved from Port Kembla to Kogarah and played five seasons at the St. George Dragons between 1982 and 1986. He was selected to represent New South Wales as a second-rower for game III of the 1984 State of Origin series.

Walsh returned to Illawarra in 1987 and became captain of the Steelers. Despite injuring two vertebrae in his neck during a game in 1987, Walsh played on and was named Clubman of the Year in 1988 and 1989. He captained the Steelers to their first trophy in 1992 – the pre-season Tooheys Challenge Cup. A knee ligament injury eventually led to his retirement after just 2 rounds in the 1992 season.

== Sources ==
- Whiticker, Alan; Hudson, Glen (2007). The Encyclopedia of Rugby League Players. Wetherill Park, New South Wales: Gary Allen Pty Ltd. p. 609. ISBN 978-1-877082-93-1.
