= List of St. George Illawarra Dragons coaches =

There have been 10 coaches of the St. George Illawarra Dragons since the joint venture club's formation in 1999.

== List of Coaches ==
As of round 12 the 2026 NRL season

No.	Name	Seasons	Games	Wins	Draws	Losses	Winning Percentage	Premiers	Runners-up	Minor premiers
1	David Waite	1999–2000	48	27	0	21	56.25%	−	1999	−
2	Andrew Farrar	2000–2002	60	26	5	29	43.33%	−	−	−
3	Nathan Brown	2003–2008	151	80	0	71	52.98%	−	−	−
4	Wayne Bennett	2009–2011	79	51	1	27	64.56%	2010	−	2009, 2010
5	Steve Price	2012–2014	58	21	0	37	36%	−	−	−
6	Paul McGregor	2014–2020	151	70	0	81	46.36%	−	−	−
7	Dean Young	2020, 2026–	10	2	0	8	20%	−	−	−
8	Anthony Griffin	2021–2023	58	22	0	36	37.93%	−	−	−
9	Ryan Carr	2023	14	3	0	11	21.43%	−	−	−
10	Shane Flanagan	2024–2026	55	19	0	36	34.55%	−	−	−
11	Dean Young	2026–present	11	2	0	9	5.5%	−	−	−

== See also ==
- List of current NRL coaches
- List of current NRL Women's coaches
