= Michael Bolt =

Australian rugby league footballer

Personal information
- Born: 6 February 1961 (age 65) Wollongong, New South Wales, Australia

Playing information
- Position: Hooker
Club
Years	Team	Pld	T	G	FG	P
1982–90	Illawarra Steelers	169	9	1	0	34

Michael Bolt (born 6 February 1961) is an Australian former professional rugby league footballer who played in the 1980s and 1990s. He played in the NSWRL Premiership for the Illawarra Steelers, as a hooker.

Bolt was the first Illawarra player to take the field as captain of the club's inaugural third-grade team in 1982 after having been recruited from Wollongong's Collegians club. However, when first-choice rake Barry Jensen suffered a neck injury, Bolt took over as first-grade hooker ahead of expected replacement Sean O‘Connor, and he became the Steelers' permanent top rake when a recurrence of Jensen's neck injury caused his retirement in July of that season. Bolt seized his opportunity so well that he would be the Illawarra "player of the year" in 1983, playing every game in the process. In 1984 Bolt would again play every first grade game for Illawarra, represent City Firsts and be regarded by observers as "one of the wiliest hookers in the competition".

However, in the 1985 pre-season Bolt was unexpectedly overtaken by long-serving understudy Sean O‘Connor, and was dropped to reserve grade for the first half of what would prove a disastrous season for Illawarra. Bolt would, however, regain his first grade berth over O‘Connor before the season ended and would keep a firm grip on it during the three ensuing seasons, by which time Bolt was accumulating exceptional records for durability: at the end of 1987 he had played 122 consecutive grade games for the Steelers without missing one, and was Illawarra's "player of the year" for a second time.

In 1989, however, Bolt lost his first-grade place to North-Queensland-bred rookie Dean Schifilliti, whose impressive performances for a consistently beaten team meant that Bolt would achieve his milestones for durability that season (his 150th consecutive grade game against Cronulla at the end of April) and next (171 consecutive grade games, again against Cronulla) in reserve grade.

When he retired at the end of 1990, Bolt had played in 187 consecutive grade matches, a then record in the NSWRL Premiership, and was the Steelers' final foundation player remaining with the club.

== External sources ==
- Alan Whiticker & Glen Hudson (2007). The Encyclopedia of Rugby League Players. Wetherill Park, New South Wales: Gary Allen Pty Ltd. ISBN 978-1-877082-93-1.
