= Allan Fitzgibbon =

Australian RL coach and former rugby league footballer

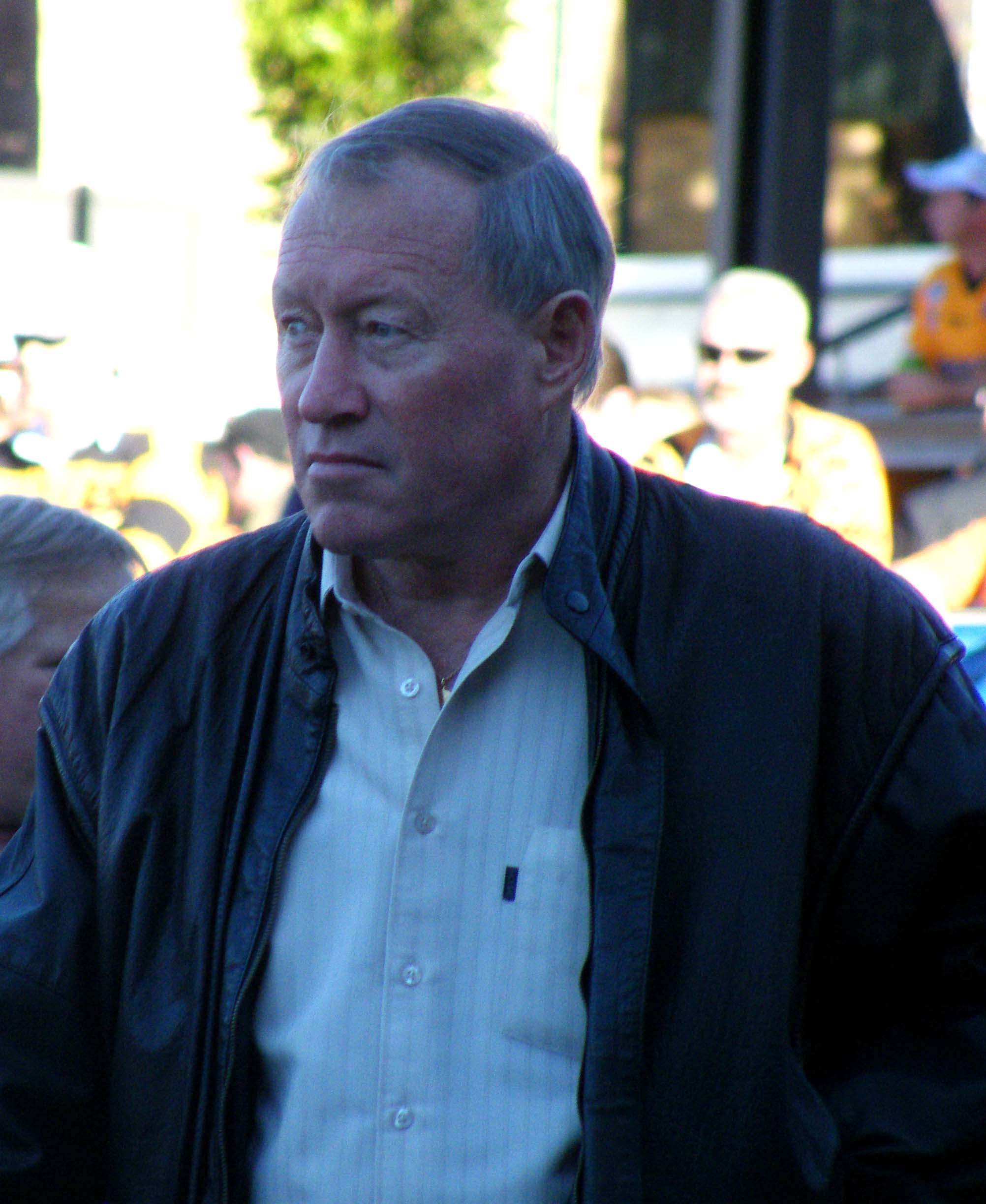

Personal information
- Full name: Allan Fitzgibbon
- Born: Wollongong, New South Wales, Australia

Playing information
- Position: Lock, Five-eighth
Club
Years	Team	Pld	T	G	FG	P
1968–70	Balmain Tigers	42	7	0	0	21
1972–73	Hull Kingston Rovers	20	3	0	0	9
	Total	62	10	0	0	30
Representative
Years	Team	Pld	T	G	FG	P
1968	New South Wales	1	0	0	0	0
1971	NSW Country	1	0	0	0	0

Coaching information
Club
Years	Team	Gms	W	D	L	W%
1982–83	Illawarra Steelers	52	14	0	38	27
1988–91	Cronulla Sharks	92	50	5	37	54
1995	Illawarra Steelers	18	8	1	9	44
	Total	162	72	6	84	44
- Relatives: Craig Fitzgibbon (son)

Allan Fitzgibbon is an Australian former rugby league footballer and coach. He played for the Balmain Tigers between 1968 and 1970, and appeared in the 1969 Grand Final where the Tigers won in an upset against the South Sydney Rabbitohs, and for Hull Kingston Rovers during the 1972–73 season. His son, Craig Fitzgibbon, became an international representative rugby league player, and has been head coach of the Cronulla-Sutherland Sharks since 2022, the same role Allan held in the late 1980s and early 1990s.

Following his playing career with Balmain, Fitzgibbon coached Dapto between 1971 and 1981, from which he represented Country in 1973. In 1982, he became the first coach of the Illawarra Steelers and guided the team through their first two seasons in the New South Wales Rugby League premiership. He would later coach the Cronulla-Sutherland Sharks between 1988 and 1991, taking the club to its inaugural minor premiership in his first year at the helm, although consecutive post-season losses left the Sharks unable to advance beyond the semi-finals. In 1995, he took charge of the Steelers once again, becoming their caretaker coach following the mid-season sacking of Graham Murray.
