= Paul McGregor (rugby league) =

Australian RL coach and former Australia international rugby league footballer

Personal information
- Full name: Paul McGregor
- Born: 31 December 1967 (age 58) Dapto, New South Wales, Australia
- Height: 188 cm (6 ft 2 in)
- Weight: 101 kg (15 st 13 lb)

Playing information
- Position: Centre
Club
Years	Team	Pld	T	G	FG	P
1991–98	Illawarra Steelers	124	44	0	0	176
1999–01	St. George Illawarra	34	13	0	0	52
	Total	158	57	0	0	228
Representative
Years	Team	Pld	T	G	FG	P
1992–97	Country Origin	5	1	0	0	4
1992–98	New South Wales	14	4	0	0	16
1994–97	Australia	3	1	0	0	4

Coaching information
Club
Years	Team	Gms	W	D	L	W%
2014–20	St. George Illawarra	151	70	0	81	46
- Source: As of 14 August 2020

Paul "Mary" McGregor (born 31 December 1967) is an Australian professional rugby league coach who was until August 2020, the head coach of the St. George Illawarra Dragons in the NRL, and a former professional rugby league footballer who played as a centre in the 1990s and 2000s.

McGregor played his club football for the Illawarra Steelers and the St. George Illawarra Dragons at the commencement of their joint venture in 1999. He remained with the club and was appointed interim coach following the sacking of Steve Price part-way through the 2014 NRL season. He played for the Country Origin, New South Wales and Australia at international level.

McGregor was the assistant coach for the New South Wales Blues between 2021 and 2023.

== Background ==
McGregor was born in Dapto, New South Wales, Australia.

== Playing career ==
McGregor played five seasons of first grade at Dapto before being signed by the Steelers at age 23 in 1991. He made his first grade debut in round 1 against the Penrith Panthers at WIN Stadium on 17 March.

McGregor represented the NSW Blues in fourteen State of Origin games between 1992 and 1998. He was a powerful runner of the football out wide and provided a great combination with his club teammate, Blues winger Rod Wishart.

Paul McGregor made his Test debut for Australia from the bench in a one-off Test against France on 6 July 1994, scoring a try in the Kangaroos record 58–0 win at the Parramatta Stadium in Sydney. At the end of the 1994 NSWRL season, he was selected to the 1994 Kangaroo tour, though his tour came to a premature end with a hamstring injury suffered in the Kangaroos 80–2 win over the Sheffield Eagles.

He was Man of the Match in Game II of the 1997 State of Origin series.

He had played 124 games with the Steelers club from 1991 to 1998, scoring 44 tries. He was a part of the Steelers 1992 Tooheys Challenge winning side that defeated the Brisbane Broncos.

McGregor was the foundation captain of the St. George Illawarra joint venture from 1999, leading the team into the 1999 NRL Grand Final against the Melbourne Storm. He spent time on the sidelines with injury that year and following a shoulder reconstruction he did not play during the entire 2000 NRL season. McGregor returned to the club in 2001 on an incentive based contract and retired at the end of the season, having played 34 games with the joint venture club.

McGregor was side-lined by a shoulder injury and so could not represent Scotland at the 2000 Rugby League World Cup

In 2011, the Illawarra Rugby League's centenary year, McGregor was named at centre in the Illawarra 'team of the century'.

== Coaching career ==
McGregor joined the St. George Illawarra's coaching staff in 2002 as a strength and conditioning coach, a position he also held with the NSW Blues.

In 2009, with Wayne Bennett joining the club, McGregor left and took up the head coaching job at the Western Suburbs Red Devils club in the Illawarra Rugby League competition.

McGregor coached the Illawarra NSW Cup team in 2012 and 2013 before taking up the assistant position at St. George Illawarra. His successor at the Illawarra Cutters was another former Illawarra player, Ian Millward.

Following the announcement of the sacking of incumbent first grade coach, Steve Price, McGregor was elevated to coach of the top tier team in May 2014, initially until the end of the 2014 season. Following improved form, McGregor was announced as the full-time head coach for the next three seasons until the end of 2017.

In 2015, McGregor coached St. George Illawarra to finish in 8th position. This was the club's first finals appearance since 2011.

In 2017, many predicted St. George Illawarra go finish in the bottom four, due to a disappointing 2016 season, where the club were extremely poor in attack. In Round 1 2017, St. George Illawarra beat Penrith 42–10. St. George Illawarra would go on to lose in Round 2, but win the next 5 games in a row. Due to improved form, the McGregor was re-signed by the club on 8 June 2017, until the end of 2019. In the second half of the 2017 season, St. George Illawarra suffered a terrible drop in form with the club winning only 4 of the last 11 matches. This drop in form culminated with the club losing against Canterbury in the last round of the regular season. Before the match, St. George Illawarra only needed victory over their lower placed opponents to qualify for the finals as North Queensland had lost the earlier match. Due to St. George Illawarra losing the game, North Queensland went on to finish in 8th place and qualify for the finals. This eventually lead to North Queensland reaching the 2017 NRL Grand Final.

In the 2018 season, McGregor guided St. George Illawarra to a 7th-place finish as they qualified for the finals. At one point, they were sitting equal first on the ladder after 20 rounds but for the third season in a row, the club suffered a late season form slump winning just 4 from the remaining 11 matches. McGregor himself came under criticism for the form slump with some sections of the media claiming his job was on the line. In week one of the finals, the Saints faced Brisbane at Suncorp Stadium with the home side being heavily fancied before the match. St. George Illawarra went on to defeat Brisbane 48–18. The following week, St. George Illawarra played South Sydney in the second elimination final. They led late until the end of the match when Adam Reynolds kicked three field goals to win the match for Souths 13–12.

On 18 April 2019, McGregor was granted a two-year contract extension by St. George Illawarra, keeping him at the club until the end of the 2021 season. After St. George Illawarra's 40–18 defeat against Penrith in Round 18 of the 2019 NRL season which left St. George Illawarra in 14th position on the ladder, McGregor came under intense media criticism after he chose to rest Ben Hunt for the game.

In the 2019 NRL season, McGregor coached the joint venture to their worst finish; 15th place. The only thing keeping St. George Illawarra from 16th place were the Gold Coast Titans. McGregor was given a contract extension after the club won four of their first six games. McGregor led the club to win just 4 of their last 18 games, a period which included five-match losing streaks from rounds 7–11 and again from rounds 16–20.

In the COVID-19 interrupted 2020 NRL season, the St. George Illawarra side lost its first four matches, including a 0-18 loss to a weakened New Zealand Warriors team, and a 22-2 loss to the last-placed Canterbury-Bankstown side, leading to renewed speculation about McGregor's future.

On 13 August 2020, McGregor was terminated as head coach St. George Illawarra. He won his final game on 14 August 2020 when his side upset the Parramatta Eels in a tough 14-12 win.

On September 15 2021, McGregor was appointed an assistant coach of the NSW Blues.

On November 5 2021, McGregor joined the Parramatta Eels coaching staff as a consultant for the 2022 NRL Season. McGregor did not renew his position following the Eels' loss at the 2022 NRL Grand Final.

On 28 September 2023, it was announced that the NSWRL board had decided not to renew McGregor's contract following another series defeat.

Following the conclusion of the 2023 NRL Season, McGregor held talks with the North Queensland Cowboys about the joining the club as an assistant to Head Coach Todd Payten. Citing family reasons, McGregor ultimately rejected the assistant role.

== Sources ==
- Alan Whiticker & Glen Hudson (2007). The Encyclopedia of Rugby League Players. Wetherill Park, New South Wales: Gary Allen Pty Ltd. ISBN 978-1-877082-93-1.
- Matt Logue. "Legend Q&A". Rugby League Week (5 March 2008). Sydney, NSW: PBLMedia: 30–31.

Sporting positions
Preceded by Steve Price; 2012–2014	Coach St. George Illawarra Dragons; 2014–2020	Succeeded by Dean Young (interim); 2020
