= John Cross (rugby league) =

Australian rugby league footballer

Personal information
- Born: 15 March 1972 (age 54) Australia

Playing information
- Height: 186 cm (6 ft 1 in)
- Weight: 100 kg (15 st 10 lb)
- Position: Lock
Club
Years	Team	Pld	T	G	FG	P
1991–97	Illawarra Steelers	137	32	0	0	128
1998–02	Penrith Panthers	109	19	0	0	76
2003	St. George Illawarra	19	2	0	0	8
	Total	265	53	0	0	212

John Cross (born 15 March 1972) is an Australian former rugby league footballer and Port Kembla Blacks junior.

Cross was a back rower who played for the Illawarra Steelers, Penrith Panthers and the St. George Illawarra Dragons

Cross is the son of former St George Player Greg Cross.

An Illawarra junior, Cross was given the honour of captaining the Illawarra side at the age of just twenty against the touring Great Britain team in 1992. He went on to captain the Illawarra Steelers in first grade.

== Sources ==
- Alan Whiticker & Glen Hudson (2007). The Encyclopedia of Rugby League Players. Wetherill Park, New South Wales: Gary Allen Pty Ltd. ISBN 978-1-877082-93-1.
