= Bruce Gordon (businessman) =

Australian businessman (born 1929)

Bruce Gordon AO
- Born: 4 February 1929 (age 97); Surry Hills, New South Wales, Australia
- Occupations: Businessman; media owner; investor
- Years active: 1949–2025
- Known for: Owner of WIN Group
- Spouse: Judith Gordon

Bruce Gordon AO (born 4 February 1929 in Surry Hills, New South Wales) is an Australian former businessman. He is the owner of the Australian television network, WIN Television through his ownership of WIN Corporation, the largest shareholder of the Nine Network, and holds a significant stake in Nine Entertainment.

== Career ==
Gordon juggled fruit to lure customers into his father's street-side fruit stall. He continued to hone his magic skills into his 20s and gained his first performance at Sydney's Tivoli circuit theatre; later progressing onto management of the theatre. During this period he got to know Rupert Murdoch, Frank Packer and his sons, Kerry and Clyde, and Bruce Gyngell.

In 1962, Gordon was appointed the Australasian sales executive for Desilu Productions, which was sold to Gulf and Western, which renamed the studio Paramount Television. Gordon worked as a programming executive for Paramount in Hollywood for thirty years.

Gordon gained control of Television Wollongong Transmission Ltd (later rebadged as WIN TV) in 1979 from Murdoch. He then expanded WIN Television's operations during the 1990s, buying out the other shareholders in 1991 after buying two licences in Queensland and Crawford Productions. By the end of the decade WIN had licences and transmitters in all Australian states and mainland territories (except NT).

Gordon holds a 50% share in the St George Illawarra Dragons club through WIN Corporation.

In September 2024, it was reported that in early August 2024, Gordon "quietly retired" from the boards of WIN Corporation and private investment firm Birketu as well as 41 private companies associated with businesses owned by him. He will remain Birketu's "ultimate decision maker", while stepping back from daily management at WIN.

Gordon was appointed an Officer of the Order of Australia in the 2025 King's Birthday Honours for "distinguished service to the media and television industries, and as a benefactor for sports and the arts".

== Personal life ==
Gordon lives in Sydney with his second wife, Judith, with additional residences in Bermuda and Monaco. Gordon has a son and a daughter.

=== Net worth ===
As of May 2025, the Australian Financial Review assessed Gordon's net worth at A$1.16 billion. Gordon is one of nine living Australians who have appeared on every Rich List, since it was first published in 1984.

Year	Financial Review Rich List		Forbes Australia's 50 richest	
Year	Rank	Net worth A$	Rank	Net worth US$
2014	34	$1.096 billion	40 ▲	$0.700 billion ▲
2015	46 ▼	$1.060 billion ▼	41 ▼	$0.720 billion ▲
2016	54 ▼	$0.990 billion ▼	46 ▼	$0.570 billion ▼
2017	107 ▼	$0.629 billion ▼	n/a	not listed
2018	113 ▼	$0.702 billion ▲		
2019	134 ▼	$0.728 billion ▲		
2020	111 ▲	$0.892 billion ▲		
2021	123 ▼	$0.870 billion ▼		
2022	110 ▲	$1.30 billion ▲		
2023	133 ▼	$1.07 billion ▼		
2024		$1.00 billion ▼		
2025	144	$1.16 billion ▲		

Legend
Icon	Description
Steady	Has not changed from the previous year
▲	Has increased from the previous year
▼	Has decreased from the previous year

== See also ==
- List of NRL club owners
