= Brett Rodwell =

Australian rugby league footballer

Personal information
- Born: 23 May 1970 (age 56)

Playing information
- Height: 185 cm (6 ft 1 in)
- Weight: 91 kg (14 st 5 lb)
- Position: Centre
Club
| Years | Team | Pld | T | G | FG | P |
|---|---|---|---|---|---|---|
| 1989–97 | Illawarra Steelers | 156 | 60 | 8 | 0 | 256 |
| 1998–99 | South Sydney | 46 | 10 | 0 | 0 | 40 |
| | Total | 202 | 70 | 8 | 0 | 296 |
Representative
| Years | Team | Pld | T | G | FG | P |
| 1991–95 | NSW Country | 3 | 0 | 0 | 0 | 0 |
| 1995 | New South Wales | 1 | 1 | 0 | 0 | 4 |
- Relatives: Tom Rodwell (son)

Brett Rodwell (born 23 May 1970) is an Australian former professional rugby league footballer who played in the 1980s and 1990s. He played in the Australian National Rugby League (NRL) competition for the Illawarra Steelers and South Sydney Rabbitohs. He primarily played in the centres.

== Playing career ==
In 1989, Rodwell was named the Steelers' rookie of the year.

Rodwell was selected to represent New South Wales in game II of the 1995 State of Origin series, scoring one try.

Rodwell played with Illawarra up until the end of the 1997 season before joining South Sydney.

Rodwell played 2 seasons at Souths including the club's final game against Parramatta in 1999 before they were controversially excluded from the competition. This in turn was Rodwell's final game in first grade and he retired after the conclusion of the season.

In 2006, Rodwell was named as a reserve in the Steelers 25th anniversary celebrations Team of Steel.
