= Illawarra Steelers =

Rugby league club in New South Wales

Club information
- Full name: Illawarra District Rugby League Football Club
- Nickname: Steelers
- Colours: Primary: Scarlet; Secondary: White
- Founded: 13 December 1980
- Exited: 1998 (joint venture with the St. George Dragons to form the St. George Illawarra Dragons)

Former details
- Competition: NSWRL, ARL, NRL
- 1998: 12th of 20

Records
- Premierships: None
- Runners-up: None
- Minor premierships: None
- Challenge Cups: 1 - 1992
- Wooden spoons: 3 – 1985, 1986, 1989

The Illawarra Steelers are an Australian rugby league football club based in the city of Wollongong, New South Wales. The club competed in Australia's top-level rugby league competition from 1982 until 1998. On 13 December 1980, they were the first non-Sydney based team to be admitted into the New South Wales Rugby League premiership, with the Canberra Raiders being admitted later ensuring an even number of teams in the competition for the start of their first season, 1982. Over their seventeen years in the top grade, the club received three wooden spoons, made the play-offs twice and had a total of three of its players (two New South Wales Blues and one Queensland Maroon) selected to play for the Australia national rugby league team.

Following the Super League War and the NRL's intention to reduce the number of teams, the Steelers approached the St. George Dragons part way through the 1998 season to discuss forming a joint-venture and ensure the partial survival of both clubs. On 23 September 1998, Rugby League's first joint-venture, the St. George Illawarra Dragons, were officially announced. The Steelers share in the club was privatised to Wollongong-based WIN Corporation in 2018.

Illawarra still field stand alone teams in the Lisa Fiaola Cup (women's under 17's) and Tarsha Gale Cup (women's under 18's), S. G. Ball Cup (under 18's) and Harold Matthews Cup (under 16's) competitions as the Steelers.

The 23,750 capacity WIN Stadium is the Steelers home stadium.

== History ==
=== Formation ===
The Illawarra Rugby League made several attempts to enter the NSWRL competition, the first major attempt was in the 1950s. It made a much more serious attempt for entry into the 1967 season but were blocked by the Country Rugby League (CRL) who used their constitution to prevent Illawarra's plans of playing in the Sydney competition. This was a crucial moment in the emergence of the Cronulla-Sutherland Sharks, as it was after Illawarra were blocked and the NSWRL wanted a second new club to enter with Penrith, preferably in the South of Sydney due to continued success at that time of the St. George Dragons, to avoid the need for a bye that "the shire's" submission was successful.

In this unsuccessful bid, Illawarra were to be backed by the then wealthy Illawarra Leagues Club in Church Street, Wollongong. The club is the second oldest leagues club in the world. It was originally established to financially support top class rugby league and soccer in the region.

On 13 December 1980, the NSWRL voted almost unanimously for Illawarra to enter in the 1982 season. Only three dissenting votes were counted, which were the three CRL representatives present. Illawarra's organiser Bob Millward told those at the meeting that rugby league in the region depended on this bid getting the go ahead. Interest in the region had turned away from local football to the Sydney competition. The Illawarra Mercury daily newspaper was increasing its coverage of the Sydney premiership and Illawarra's inclusion was viewed as the best way of reviving the local league.

=== 1980s ===
Chart of yearly table positions for Illawarra Steelers in First Grade NSWRL

Illawarra entered the competition in 1982, with financial backing from many of the local leagues clubs. Their first captain was star fullback John Dorahy, and first coach Allan Fitzgibbon. Unfortunately, the recession hit hard and the leagues club money dried up and the Steelers were a new club in desperate financial trouble. In 1984, BHP Steel saved the club, signing on as the major sponsor. BHP stayed with the Steelers until they left the NRL at the end of the 1998 season.

Their first 8 seasons produced 3 wooden spoons, but things started to improve for the club. In the 1989 Panasonic Cup the club reached the final which was played against the Brisbane Broncos at Parramatta Stadium. The Broncos raced to a 16–0 lead and it seemed the Steelers much more fancied opponents would run away with the game. But Illawarra, inspired by eventual man-of-the-match, Great Britain international halfback Andy Gregory, hit back. Young Illawarra Juniors such as Brett Rodwell and Rod Wishart made their mark in this game, players that would form the foundation of the club's improved performances in the early 1990s. Illawarra lost the match 22–20, however Brisbane scored a try off what appeared to be forward pass. The large Illawarra contingent at Parramatta Stadium booed the Broncos after their win, with Brisbane captain Wally Lewis gaining their ire by gesturing back. Illawarra's performance inspired Australian folk singer John Williamson to write a song about the match. The 1989 season also saw Gregory's Wigan and Great Britain teammate, fullback Steve Hampson, playing for the Steelers.

=== 1990s ===
1990 saw big improvements with the club finishing not too far away from the top five. The Steelers licensed club opened its doors thanks to the efforts of the local community and businesses. Whereas Sydney teams had huge financial support from their respective leagues clubs, Illawarra for the first time had its own small leagues club but with an enviable major sponsor (BHP Steel) and sleeve sponsor combination – The Steelers making Rugby League history as the first club to have a sleeve sponsor, with MMI Insurance getting on board.

A new coach by the name of Graham Murray turned Illawarra into an almost unbeatable force at the Wollongong Showground in 1991, losing only to the Penrith Panthers who went on to win the premiership. A crushing 44–4 win over Canterbury-Bankstown, an upset win over Manly in a Sunday match of the round as well as a big win over Brisbane, 19–2, were signs of things to come. A crucial refereeing decision by Bill Harrigan towards the end of the season in a game at Penrith Stadium put an end to their finals aspirations. Harrigan, much to his credit, apologised in the media after the game. Thus Illawarra missed out on a place in the finals by just two points, despite having a season points differential second only to eventual premiers, Penrith.

The Steelers were able to avenge their 1989 Panasonic Cup Final loss to Brisbane by beating them in the 1992 pre-season Tooheys Challenge Cup, in a try-less final at Dubbo, 4–2. This sparked their successful 1992 Winfield Cup campaign, going to within one game from the Grand Final. Illawarra's first semi-final was against future merger partner St. George, beating "big-brother" 18–16. Next a loss to the Broncos 22–12 and their last chance against St. George, losing 4–0. However, Illawarra were denied tries on several controversial occasions leaving the Steelers with a bitter end to their successful season.

During the 1992 season, the Steelers hosted the touring Great Britain Lions. In front of 9,500 fans at Steelers Stadium with the tourists winning a tight game 11–10, Illawarra resting several star players.

1993 was a season met by Steelers fans with high expectations, but crucial tight losses and games they were expected to win saw the side finish just outside the top 5.

In 1994, the club finished in 6th place, 2 points behind Brisbane. Following these results, the club was considered a competitor in the Winfield Cup.

Super League hit in 1995 and the Steelers were in for a rough ride. The good work in becoming a credible force in the competition went out the window with the sacking of Graham Murray, which is the only incident where anyone in the competition lost their job as a direct result of the Super League war. Murray was organising meetings between Illawarra players and Super League officials, as Super League had intentions of either getting the Steelers or possibly a new Illawarra club. Local club Wests Illawarra were reported in the Illawarra Mercury as being a potential Illawarra Super League club. Local league fans reacted angrily and nothing came of it. Illawarra and its supporters remained loyal to the ARL, though Steelers board member and then speaker of the House of Representatives, Dr Stephen Martin, resigned from the club citing the need to join Super League for them to survive. Martin would be proved right within three years.

1996 was another year of disappointment, with players not seeing eye-to-eye with new coach Allan McMahon. A horror 54–4 thrashing at the hands of arch-rival Brisbane Broncos was the low point. McMahon, despite signing a three-year contract, was sacked at the end of the season and was replaced the next season by former player and then reserve grade coach Andrew Farrar.

In 1997's stand-alone Australian Rugby League competition, the Steelers finished sixth, qualifying for the Finals series, only to bow out in the first week at a rain sodden and sparsely populated Parramatta Stadium. Having beaten the Gold Coast Chargers comprehensively in Wollongong in the final round, they put in shocking performance to lose to the same side they had just beaten the previous week.

1998 saw the Steelers come agonisingly close to the finals, missing out with other results going against them and a heartbreaking 1 point loss to eventual grand finalists Canterbury-Bankstown in their final match.

During season 1998, the newly established NRL administration announced the entry criteria for teams to compete from the year 2000, with clubs offered incentives to form joint ventures. A controversial aspect of the criteria for the Illawarra region was the classification of the Steelers as a Sydney club. Additionally, Newcastle, Canberra and Auckland would be given automatic entry, with Illawarra believing they too were an important regional centre that should stand alone.

Alas, with the possibility of not making the cut, Illawarra approached St. George and initiated joint venture talks midway through 1998. Western Suburbs (whom Illawarra were rumoured to be merging with in the 1980s) and Cronulla both expressed interest but Steelers CEO Bob Millward claimed that the club's preferred partner was always St. George. The joint venture was officially announced at the end of the season, and would be named St. George Illawarra Dragons, playing 50% of their home games in Sydney and 50% in Wollongong in 1999.

Notable players produced by the Illawarra Steelers include international representatives Rod Wishart and Paul McGregor. Former Steelers players Trent Barrett, Shaun Timmins and Craig Fitzgibbon went on to represent their country after the Steelers' final stand-alone season in 1998.

=== Season summaries ===
P=Premiers, R=Runners-up, M=Minor Premierships, F=Finals Appearance, W=Wooden Spoons (Brackets Represent Finals Games)
Competition	Games Played	Games Won	Games Drawn	Games Lost	Ladder Position	P	R	M	F	W	Coach	Captain	Details
1982 NSWRFL season	26	6	0	20	13 / 14						Allan Fitzgibbon	John Dorahy	Illawarra Steelers 1982
1983 NSWRFL season	26	8	0	18	12 / 14						Allan Fitzgibbon	John Dorahy	Illawarra Steelers 1983
1984 NSWRL season	24	12	0	12	9 / 13						Brian Smith	John Dorahy	Illawarra Steelers 1984
1985 NSWRL season	24	5	0	19	13 / 13					♦	Brian Smith	John Dorahy	Illawarra Steelers 1985
1986 NSWRL season	24	7	0	17	13 / 13					♦	Brian Smith		Illawarra Steelers 1986
1987 NSWRL season	24	8	0	16	11 / 13						Brian Smith	Perry Haddock	Illawarra Steelers 1987
1988 NSWRL season	22	6	1	15	13 / 16						Terry Fearnley	Perry Haddock	Illawarra Steelers 1988
1989 NSWRL season	22	2	1	19	16 / 16					♦	Ron Hilditch	Chris Walsh	Illawarra Steelers 1989
1990 NSWRL season	22	11	1	10	9 / 16						Ron Hilditch	Chris Walsh	Illawarra Steelers 1990
1991 NSWRL season	22	12	1	9	8 / 16						Graham Murray	Chris Walsh	Illawarra Steelers 1991
1992 NSWRL season	22 (3)	13 (1)	1 (0)	8 (2)	3 / 16				♦		Graham Murray	Chris Walsh	Illawarra Steelers 1992
1993 NSWRL season	22	12	0	10	7 / 16						Graham Murray	Dean Schifilliti	Illawarra Steelers 1993
1994 NSWRL season	22	11	3	8	6 / 16						Graham Murray		Illawarra Steelers 1994
1995 ARL season	22	10	1	11	12 / 20						Graham Murray→Allan Fitzgibbon	John Cross	Illawarra Steelers 1995
1996 ARL season	22	8	0	14	14 / 20						Allan McMahon	John Cross, Paul McGregor	Illawarra Steelers 1996
1997 ARL season	22 (1)	10 (0)	3 (0)	9 (1)	6 / 12				♦		Andrew Farrar	Paul McGregor	Illawarra Steelers 1997
1998 NRL season	24	11	1	12	12 / 20						Andrew Farrar	Paul McGregor	Illawarra Steelers 1998

=== Joint venture ===
The Illawarra Steelers decided to form a joint venture with the St. George Dragons for the 1999 NRL season to form the St. George Illawarra Dragons. The Illawarra and St. George contingents are equal stakeholders in the new club, and until 2014, half of the new team's home games were played at WIN Stadium. The Illawarra Steelers have at times provided the bulk of St. George Illawarra's squad, including internationals Matt Cooper, Luke Bailey, Jason Ryles, Shaun Timmins, Trent Barrett, Brett Morris, Josh Morris and Ben Creagh.

The joint venture is often seen as a takeover. Many supporters feel that the Illawarra is not appropriately acknowledged in St. George Illawarra, as the logo and main jersey were taken directly from those of St. George (albeit with the addition of "Illawarra" to the bottom of the emblem). Furthermore, Illawarra fans continue to be alienated by St. George supporters who still chant "St. George" at games and wave banners like "Great St. George Team". The media and other rugby league fans also often leave out Illawarra and continue to call the joint venture entity "St. George", much to the chagrin and dismay of those from the Illawarra side. St. George Illawarra has sometimes taken token steps to acknowledge Illawarra. One example of this is that, on 18 April 2004 against Penrith at WIN Stadium, St. George Illawarra introduced an alternate jersey which was predominantly red (with white stripes), this being recognisably similar to the former Steelers' jersey. This replaced the "blood and bandages" jersey of red-and-white horizontal stripes, which was also a former St. George jersey. St. George Illawarra have since reverted to the old St. George "blood and bandages" design as their alternate jersey.

While Illawarra is still somewhat represented in the National Rugby League by the St. George Illawarra Dragons, the Illawarra Steelers participated as a single entity in the NSW Cup until the end of 2017 (as the Illawarra Cutters from 2012 and then Illawarra RLFC in 2017, due to a sponsorship deal with Illawarra Coal) and in the junior competitions, most notably S.G. Ball Cup and Harold Matthews Cup. The Steelers made the Harold Matthews Cup grand final in 2011, losing 13–12 to the Canterbury Bulldogs.

In early 2006, WIN Television Network (originating from and headquartered in Wollongong) bought a 25% share in the St. George Illawarra club for $6.5 million (half of Illawarra's share), erasing most of the debt Illawarra owed to St. George. This formalised the strong support the network has shown for the Steelers in years gone by and ensured that Wollongong will continue to host top level rugby league. WIN Corporation can only sell their stake back to the Steelers, should they wish to withdraw their involvement, thus ensuring Illawarra are always properly represented in the joint venture.

In 2008, Illawarra's debt to St. George was paid off, with the 20% sale of the Steelers Club building to a Bermuda-based company owned by Illawarra billionaire (and WIN Television boss) Bruce Gordon.

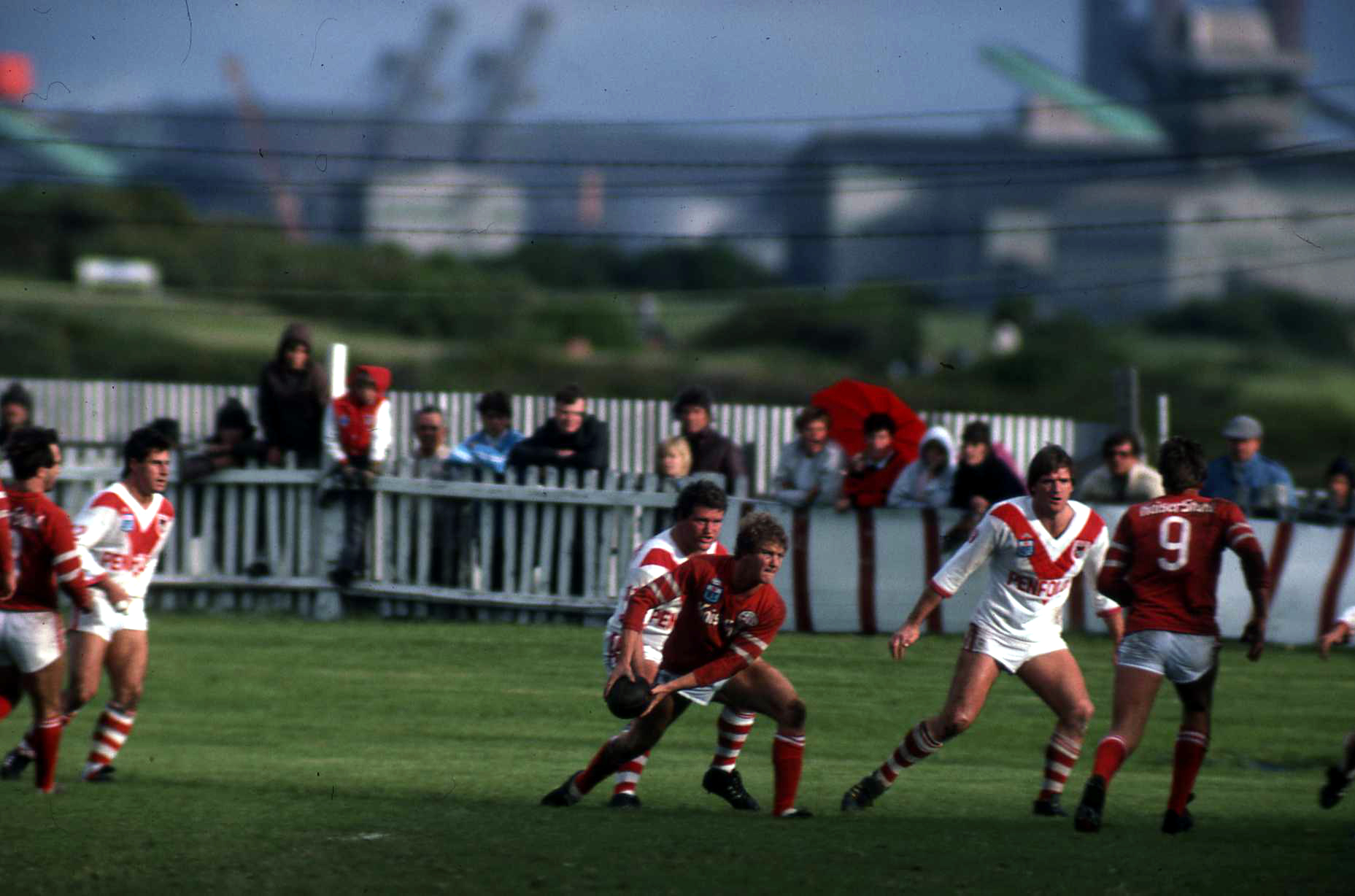
Illawarra Steelers v St. George Dragons

In 2016, Illawarra won their first and only premiership title with the 2016 against Mount Pritchard Mounties at Parramatta Stadium. This was the final game ever played at this venue.

One week later, Illawarra claimed the NRL State Championship on NRL Grand Final day with an emphatic 54–12 win over Queensland Cup winners the Burleigh Bears at Stadium Australia.

On 27 October 2017, it was announced that Illawarra would be replaced by The St. George Illawarra Dragons for The 2018 Intrust Super Premiership NSW season as part of a restructure in the competition. It was the first time since 2007 that a full St. George Illawarra Dragons side featured in the reserve grade competition.

The approach brought the club in line with the NRL's ‘whole of game’ strategy that also saw top-grade squads increased from 25 players to 30. Club director of rugby league pathways Ian Millward said of the change “There's obviously a lot of changes in rugby league at the moment, one of the changes we’ve made is that the reserve grade team is St. George Illawarra,” Millward said. “What it gives us is a clear pathway where younger players aspire to be Dragons right through to our first grade squad. There's a clear acknowledgment for coaches, training staff and players that when they're in our environment they are a part of the St. George Illawarra Dragons".

In August 2018 WIN Corporation purchased the Illawarra Steelers remaining 25% stake in the joint venture St. George Illawarra Dragons club for a "commercially in confidence" sum. The St. George Dragons and the Illawarra-based WIN Corporation now have a 50% stake each. WIN Corporation has paid off the $6 million debt the St. George Illawarra Dragons owed the NRL.

== Name, emblem and mascot ==
The name "Steelers" was chosen in reference to the local Port Kembla Steelworks, which was the Illawarra region's largest economy employer. (BHP, who owned the steelworks, eventually sponsored the team for most of their existence.) Other names considered were "Lions" and "Steelies". The actual 'Steelers' name came after a competition was run to choose a name. The name was chosen by Dapto High School student Roger White, who was also a fan of the Pittsburgh Steelers NFL team in the United States. Roger responded to a competition published in the Illawarra Mercury Newspaper.

Illawarra Steelers – Emblems

Their mascot from 1982 to 1998 was the legendary "Stanley, the Steel Avenger", also commonly referred to as "Stanley the Steeler". Stanley holds the dubious honour of being the only team mascot in Rugby League history to be sent from the field. In Round 20 of the 1995 season, Illawarra hosted Balmain at Steelers Stadium. A fight between players spilled over the sideline, with Stanley reaching in to separate players. The referee instantly sent Stanley off, whilst the fight ensued.

== Colours ==
The original Steelers jersey was all scarlet with two white hooped stripes on each sleeve. The alternate design was the same colours in reverse. The club kept this design until 1995, adding a third stripe on each sleeve and three hoops around the middle of the jersey to the white alternate jersey, then adopting the same design for the scarlet jersey in 1997. The Steelers simplistic design compared well with the many "space-aged" designs of several other clubs that came and went each season throughout the Super League period and into the 2000s. For the Steelers heritage days in 2005 and 2010, the Dragons wore an Illawarra heritage jersey, which was the same as the original Steelers jumper. This move proved very popular amongst former Illawarra fans. From 2011 to 2013, the Dragons wore an alternate jersey based on the original Steelers' design.

The colours scarlet and white were automatically chosen as they were long worn by Illawarra representative teams in several sports. Local miners uniforms in the early 20th century were scarlet and some associate this with the reason for it becoming the region's sporting colours. It is also the colour of the Illawarra flame tree, another symbol of the region.

The Illawarra Cutters wore a kit similar to that of the club's 1980s and early 1990s design.

Many of the current NRL clubs are reverting to more simplistic jerseys, such as Illawarra's fellow 1982 entrants Canberra.

The junior Illawarra sides such as the Harold Matthews Cup and S. G. Ball Cup sides currently wear the 1980s design.

In 2025, the St. George Illawarra club brought back Steelers home concept, along with shorts and socks, reflecting the triple hoop design from 1997 & 1998.

== Illawarra Steelers Leagues Club ==
The Illawarra Steelers Leagues Club is situated in the middle of the City Beach precinct, the Steelers Club is located adjacent to WIN Entertainment Centre and WIN Stadium. It is directly across the road from the grounds Western Grandstand. Established in 1990, the club has struggled in comparison to the much larger and more popular leagues clubs in the region, such as Collegians, Dapto Leagues Club, Wests Illawarra Leagues Club, and Shellharbour Workers Club. However, after a major restructure of its operations, the Steelers Club has been trading profitably through the 2010s. Twenty percent of the club premises were sold to Bermuda-based Billionaire and owner of WIN Corporation, Bruce Gordon. The sale fetched 2.6 million dollars.

== Stadium ==
The Illawarra Steelers played all their home games at the Wollongong Showground (currently named WIN Stadium). The ground for many years was also named Steelers Stadium, which many still affectionately call the ground.

The Steelers record attendance in Wollongong was against St. George on 21 May 1993 at 17,527. The lowest crowd record was against Cronulla on 6 July 1985 at 3,433.

The Illawarra sides in lower grades still the play the bulk of home games at WIN Stadium. On rare occasions, the Illawarra Cutters move home games to WIN Jubilee Oval to coincide with NRL fixtures and to also other venues on the South Coast.

== Junior Steelers ==
The Illawarra Steelers still field teams in the under-age NSWRL competitions of Harold Matthews Cup (U-16s) and S. G. Ball Cup (U-18s). In 2019, Illawarra won the S. G. Ball Cup defeating Manly 34–23 in the final at the new Western Sydney Stadium.

== Supporters ==
Counted amongst the club's supporters is Olympic athlete Louise McPaul.

== Future ==
The Illawarra Steelers club members voted unanimously to allow the sale of 20% of the club premises to a company owned by Bermuda-based Wollongong billionaire Bruce Gordon. The sale fetched the club $2.6 million, allowing Illawarra to clear all debts to St.. George. Whilst the Steelers Club is improving its financial position, and now trading profitably, the club still finds itself struggling against the larger and more popular of other Leagues Clubs in Wollongong such as Collegians, The Builders Club, Wests Illawarra and Illawarra Leagues, and also Shellharbour Workers Club in Shellharbour. The Steelers were competitive with Sydney Clubs by the 1990s but Super League raised the financial bar too quickly and blew them out of the water at a crucial time in their development. Being classified as a Sydney metropolitan team during the NRL's criteria for entry into the 14 team competition for the year 2000 and measuring the club's performances through the devastating Super League period left Illawarra at a huge disadvantage compared with other non-Sydney based clubs such as Canberra, Newcastle, Melbourne and North Queensland. The only hope for Illawarra's return to the big league would be to gain the backing of a wealthy 'white knight' or consortium who can see the potential of a stand-alone Illawarra Steelers - convince the NRL and invest significant money so they can keep their local talent and achieve the potential that they started to reveal in the early 1990s.

== Statistics and records ==
=== Club ===
- Biggest win: 45 – 0 against Canberra Raiders at Wollongong Showground on 25 April 1982
- Worst defeat: 0 – 51 against Newtown Jets at Henson Park on 2 May 1982
- Longest winning streak: 4 matches
  - 4–25 July 1993
  - 25 June – 17 July 1997
- Longest losing streak: 11 matches, 1988
- Largest home crowd: 17,527, against St. George Dragons at WIN Stadium, Wollongong on 21 May 1993

=== Individual ===
- Most tries in a match: 5 by Alan McIndoe against Gold Coast Seagulls at Steelers Stadium on 4 May 1991
- Most goals in a match: 10 by Rod Wishart against Parramatta Eels at Steelers Stadium on 16 July 1995
- Most points in a match: 22 (1 try, 9 goals) by Rod Wishart against Western Suburbs Magpies at Steelers Stadium on 27 August 1995
- Most tries in a season: 19 by Alan McIndoe in 1991 NSWRL season
- Most goals in a season: 76 by John Dorahy in 1983 NSWRFL season
- Most points in a season: 176 (11 tries, 66 goals) by Rod Wishart in 1995 ARL season
- Most tries in club history: 68 by Rod Wishart, between 1989 and 1998
- Most goals in club history: 386 by Rod Wishart, between 1989 and 1998
- Most points in club history: 1,044 (68 tries, 386 goals) by Rod Wishart between 1989 and 1998
- Most appearances: Michael Bolt 167, Brett Rodwell 156, Rod Wishart 154, Neil Piccinelli 145, Brian Hetherington 144, John Cross 137, Alan McIndoe 125, Paul McGregor 124, John Simon 120, David Walsh 114

== Players ==
=== Team of Steel ===
In 2006 the Illawarra Steelers celebrated their 25th anniversary and named a "Team of Steel", including the best players of the club's history.

No.

Position
Player

1 John Dorahy – FB 2 Rod Wishart – WG 3 Brett Rodwell – CE 4 Paul McGregor – CE 5 Alan McIndoe – WG 6 Dale Fritz – FE 7 John Simon – HB 8 Chris Walsh – PR (vc) 9 Michael Bolt – HK

No.

Position
Player

10 David Walsh – PR 11 Neil Piccinelli – SR 12 Ian Russell – SR 13 John Cross – LK (c) 14 Michael Carberry – positions 15 Brian Hetherington – positions 16 Greg Mackey – positions 17 Dean Schifilliti – positions Graham Murray – positions (coach)

== Representative players ==
Including players from the Illawarra Steelers that have represented while at the club and the years they achieved their honours, if known.

=== International ===
==== Australia ====
- (Australia) Alan McIndoe (1988)
- (Australia) Rod Wishart (1991–92, 1994–96)
- (Australia) Bob Lindner (1993)
- (Australia) Paul McGregor (1994–95, 1997)

==== New Zealand ====
- (New Zealand) Craig Smith (1998)

==== Great Britain ====
- (United Kingdom) Andy Gregory (1989)
- (United Kingdom) Steve Hampson (1989)

==== Rest of the World ====
- (New Zealand) Craig Smith (1997)

=== State of origin ===
==== New South Wales ====
- (New South Wales) Brian Hetherington (1984, 1986)
- (New South Wales) Rod Wishart (1990–98)
- (New South Wales) Paul McGregor (1992–95, 1997–98)
- (New South Wales) John Simon (1992)
- (New South Wales) Brett Rodwell (1995)
- (New South Wales) Trent Barrett (1997)

==== Queensland ====
- (Queensland) Alan McIndoe (1988)
- (Queensland) Bob Lindner (1993)
- (Queensland) Darren Fritz (1994)
- (Queensland) Craig Smith (1997)

=== City Vs Country Origin ===
==== NSW Country ====
- (New South Wales) Paul Upfield (1988)
- (New South Wales) Ian Russell (1991)
- (New South Wales) Rod Wishart (1991–94, 1996)
- (New South Wales) Paul McGregor (1992–95, 1997)
- (New South Wales) John Cross (1995)
- (New South Wales) Brett Rodwell (1991, 1993, 1995)
- (New South Wales) John Simon (1992–95)

== Coaches ==
No	Name	Seasons	Games	Wins	Draws	Losses	Win %
1	Allan Fitzgibbon	1982–1983, 1995	70	22	1	47	31.4
2	Brian Smith	1984–1987	96	32	0	64	33.3
3	Terry Fearnley	1988	22	6	1	15	27.3
4	Ron Hilditch	1989–1990	44	13	2	29	29.5
5	Graham Murray	1991–1995	95	51	5	39	53.7
6	Allan McMahon	1996	22	8	0	14	36.4
7	Andrew Farrar	1997–1998	47	21	4	22	44.7

== Average attendance ==
The Illawarra Steelers average attendances from their entry into the competition in 1982 were:

Season	Average attendance
1998	9,248
1997	8,695
1996	7,434
1995	9,651
1994	11,911
1993	12,321
1992	13,750
1991	12,244
1990	9,968
1989	7,253
1988	8,386
1987	7,498
1986	7,535
1985	5,634
1984	7,086
1983	5,892
1982	8,222
