= Tooheys Challenge Cup =

Rugby league competition

The Tooheys Challenge Cup (subsequently known by various other sponsors' names including the Channel Ten Challenge Cup, Lotto Challenge Cup and Tooheys Challenge Cup) was a Post-season knockout rugby league competition run by the New South Wales Rugby League held in Australia between 1978 and 1995. The format was a straight knock-out. It aired on Channel Ten from 1978 to 1991, and the Nine Network from 1992 to 1995.

== History ==
The competition ran over seven editions, in 1978 and from 1990 until 1995. During that second period, the competition was the top cup rugby league competition after the Amco Cup was dissolved the year before.

Host cities over the course of the competition included Sydney, Brisbane, Gold Coast, Lismore, Wagga Wagga, Albury, Dubbo, Broken Hill, Gunnedah, Parkes, Narrandera, Tamworth, Port Macquarie, Orange, West Wyalong, Cobar, Bega, Inverell, Coffs Harbour, Armidale, Bathurst, Ballina, Nambucca Heads, Bundaberg, Toowoomba, Alice Springs, Wellington and Auckland.

== Challenge Cup winners ==
NSWRL Challenge Cup Grand Finals
Year	Winner	Score	Loser	Venue	City/Town
1978	North Sydney Bears	23-14	South Sydney Rabbitohs	Leichhardt Oval	Sydney
1990	Canberra Raiders	12-2	Penrith Panthers	Parramatta Stadium	Sydney
1991	Brisbane Broncos	20-16	Penrith Panthers	Excelsior Sports Ground	Broken Hill
1992	Illawarra Steelers	4-2	Brisbane Broncos	Apex Oval	Dubbo
1993	Canberra Raiders	21-18	Western Suburbs Magpies	Apex Oval	Dubbo
1994	South Sydney Rabbitohs	27-26	Brisbane Broncos	Lavington Sports Ground	Albury
1995	Brisbane Broncos	30-14	Cronulla-Sutherland Sharks	Lavington Sports Ground	Albury

== See also ==
- Amco Cup
- NSW Challenge Cup
