= 1967 Cronulla-Sutherland Sharks season =

- NSWRFL rank: 12th
- 1967 record: Wins: 3; draws: 1; losses: 18
- Points scored: For: 208 (22 tries, 67 goals, 4 field goals); against: 486 (88 tries, 104 goals, 7 field goals)

Team information
- Coach: Ken Kearney
- Captain: Monty Porter
- Stadium: Sutherland Oval
- Avg. attendance: 5,825

Top scorers
- Tries: Monty Porter (3); Dennis Hewett (3)
- Goals: Terry Hughes (67)
- Points: Terry Hughes (139)
1968 →

The 1967 Cronulla-Sutherland Sharks season was the club's inaugural season in the New South Wales Rugby Football League premiership.

== Ladder ==
	Team	Pld	W	D	L	PF	PA	PD	Pts
1	St. George	22	16	1	5	437	267	+170	33
2	South Sydney	22	16	0	6	422	271	+151	32
3	Canterbury-Bankstown	22	14	1	7	349	269	+80	29
4	Eastern Suburbs	22	13	2	7	269	219	+50	28
5	Manly-Warringah	22	12	2	8	365	271	+94	26
6	Balmain	22	12	2	8	344	258	+86	26
7	Western Suburbs	22	10	2	10	269	255	+14	22
8	North Sydney	22	8	1	13	297	370	-73	17
9	Parramatta	22	8	0	14	309	322	-13	16
10	Newtown	22	7	2	13	274	406	-132	16
11	Penrith	22	5	2	15	203	352	-149	12
12	Cronulla-Sutherland	22	3	1	18	208	486	-278	7

== Results ==
2 April 1967 Round 1	Eastern Suburbs	5 – 11	Cronulla-Sutherland	Sydney Sports Ground
	Tries: Jim Matthews; Goals: Gwyl Barnes	Report	Tries: John Hynes; Goals: Terry Hughes (4)	Attendance: 6,137

8 April 1967 Round 2	Balmain	30 – 12	Cronulla-Sutherland	Leichhardt Oval
	Tries: Hal Browne (2); Kevin Yow Yeh; Peter Provan; Goals: Keith Barnes (9)	Report	Tries: Alan McRitchie; Dennis Hewett; Goals: Terry Hughes (3)	Attendance: 8,741; Referee: Les Samuelson

15 April 1967 Round 3	South Sydney	23 – 15	Cronulla-Sutherland	Redfern Oval
	Tries: Bob Moses; Brian James; John Sattler; Goals: Eric Simms (5); Kevin Longbottom; Field Goals: Bob Honan	Report	Tries: Dave Cooper; Goals: Terry Hughes (6)	Attendance: 8,256; Referee: Phil Elliss

22 April 1967 Round 4	Cronulla-Sutherland	23 – 11	Parramatta	Sutherland Oval
	Tries: Jack Danzey; Dave Cooper; Greg Miller; Goals: Terry Hughes (6); Field Goals: Jack Danzey		Tries: John McMartin; Goals: Brian Bevan (2); Frank Glover (2)	Attendance: 5,245; Referee: Keith Page

25 April 1967 Round 5	Western Suburbs	19 – 7	Cronulla-Sutherland	Lidcombe Oval
	Tries: Barry Bryant; John Hayes; Roy Ferguson; Goals: Tony Ford (4); Field Goals: Barry Glasgow		Tries: Brian Cox; Goals: Terry Hughes (2)	Attendance: 5,037; Referee: Phil Elliss

29 April 1967 Round 6	Cronulla-Sutherland	15 – 29	Canterbury-Bankstown	Sutherland Oval
	Tries: Dennis Hewett; Goals: Terry Hughes (5); Field Goals: Jack Danzey		Tries: Dick Webb; John Larcombe; Kevin Goldspink; Leo Toohey; Max Brown; Goals: George Taylforth (7)	Attendance: 7,020; Referee: Keith Page

7 May 1967 Round 7	Newtown	29 – 9	Cronulla-Sutherland	Henson Park
	Tries: Brian Moore (3); Allan Maddalena; Bob Lanigan; Goals: Bob Lanigan (5); Field Goals: Bob Lanigan; Peter Nobbs		Tries: Alan McRitchie; Goals: Terry Hughes (3)	Attendance: 3,870; Referee: Col Pearce

14 May 1967 Round 8	Manly-Warringah	39 – 5	Cronulla-Sutherland	Brookvale Oval
	Tries: Les Hanigan (5); Mick Veivers; Bob Batty; Goals: Bob Batty (8); Field Goals: Bob Batty		Tries: Dennis Hewett; Goals: Terry Hughes	Attendance: 6,726; Referee: Laurie Bruyeres

21 May 1967 Round 9	St. George	20 – 9	Cronulla-Sutherland	Kogarah Oval
	Tries: Stan Gorton (2); Barry Beath; Johnny King; Goals: Dennis Preston (4)		Tries: Graeme Sams; Goals: Terry Hughes (3)	Attendance: 7,388; Referee: Jack Bradley

27 May 1967 Round 10	Cronulla-Sutherland	19 – 13	North Sydney	Sutherland Oval
	Tries: Monty Porter (2); Graeme Sams; Goals: Terry Hughes (5)		Tries: Ken Irvine (2); Lloyd Weier; Goals: Ken Irvine; Field Goals: Tommy Smales	Attendance: 3,050; Referee: Keith Holman

4 June 1967 Round 11	Cronulla-Sutherland	10 – 13	Penrith	Sutherland Oval
	Goals: Terry Hughes (5)		Tries: David Applebee; Maurie Raper; Wayne Peckham; Goals: Grahame Moran (2)	Attendance: 5,602; Referee: Don Macdonald

12 June 1967 Round 12	Cronulla-Sutherland	4 – 11	Eastern Suburbs	Sutherland Oval
	Goals: Terry Hughes (2)		Tries: Barry Reilly (2); Ron Saddler; Goals: Allan McKean	Attendance: 3,000; Referee: Keith Holman

17 June 1967 Round 13	Cronulla-Sutherland	6 – 6	Balmain	Sutherland Oval
	Goals: Terry Hughes (2); Field Goals: Gordon Abercrombie		Tries: Gary Leo; Kevin Yow Yeh	Attendance: 4,717; Referee: Don MacDonald

24 June 1967 Round 14	Cronulla-Sutherland	14 – 29	South Sydney	Sutherland Oval
	Tries: Monty Porter; Ron Dutton; Goals: Terry Hughes (3); Field Goals: Terry Hughes		Tries: Brian James (2); Bob McCarthy; Ron Coote; Eric Simms; Goals: Eric Simms (7)	Attendance: 10,094; Referee: Brian Barry

2 July 1967 Round 15	Parramatta	15 – 10	Cronulla-Sutherland	Cumberland Oval
	Tries: Joe Turski; Ron Graham; Len Stacker; Goals: Len Stacker (3)		Tries: Jack Danzey; Terry Hughes; Goals: Terry Hughes (2)	Attendance: 7,625; Referee: Don MacDonald

9 July 1967 Round 16	Cronulla-Sutherland	0 – 26	Western Suburbs	Sutherland Oval
			Tries: John Elford (2); Denis Pittard; Peter Dimond; Goals: Don Parish (7)	Attendance: 4,983; Referee: Don MacDonald

15 July 1967 Round 17	Canterbury-Bankstown	25 – 6	Cronulla-Sutherland	Belmore Oval
	Tries: Max Brown (2); Ron Raper; Dick Webb; George Taylforth; Goals: George Taylforth (4); Field Goals: Ron Raper		Goals: Terry Hughes (3)	Attendance: 7,309; Referee: Don MacDonald

23 July 1967 Round 18	Cronulla-Sutherland	9 – 22	Newtown	Sutherland Oval
	Tries: Ron Dutton; Goals: Terry Hughes (3)		Tries: Bob Carnegie; Brian Moore; John Oakley; Bob Lanigan; Goals: Bob Lanigan (5)	Attendance: 3,049; Referee: Carl Langton

30 July 1967 Round 19	Cronulla-Sutherland	7 – 27	Manly-Warringah	Sutherland Oval
	Tries: Warren Ryan; Goals: Terry Hughes (2)		Tries: John Morgan (2); Alec Tennant; Gary Collins; Bob Batty; Goals: Bob Batty (5); David Knox	Attendance: 3,717; Referee: Don MacDonald

5 August 1967 Round 20	Cronulla-Sutherland	6 – 42	St. George	Sutherland Oval
	Goals: Terry Hughes (3)		Tries: Bruce Pollard (2); Reg Gasnier (2); George Evans; Graeme Langlands; Johnny King; Dennis Preston; Goals: Dennis Preston (9)	Attendance: 3,936; Referee: Laurie Bruyeres

13 August 1967 Round 21	North Sydney	30 – 6	Cronulla-Sutherland	North Sydney Oval
	Tries: Ken Irvine (4); Col Greenwood; Dave Wood; Goals: Keith Russell (6)		Goals: Terry Hughes (3)	Attendance: 3,458; Referee: Keith Page

19 August 1967 Round 22	Penrith	22 – 5	Cronulla-Sutherland	Penrith Park
	Tries: Wayne Peckham (2); David Applebee; Geoff Waldie; Goals: Bob Landers (5)		Tries: Brian Cox; Goals: Terry Hughes	Attendance: 2,793; Referee: Brian Barry
