= 1968 NSWRFL season =

Rugby league competition

1968 New South Wales Rugby Football League
- Teams: 12
- Premiers: South Sydney (18th title)
- Minor premiers: South Sydney (14th title)
- Matches played: 136
- Points scored: 4027
- Total attendance: 1,894,627
- Top points scorer: Eric Simms (212)
- Wooden spoon: Newtown (5th spoon)
- Rothmans Medal: Terry Hughes
- Top try-scorer: Stan Gorton (22)

The 1968 New South Wales Rugby Football League premiership was the 61st season of professional rugby league football in Australia. Twelve teams, including six Sydney-based foundation teams and another six from around Sydney competed for the J.J. Giltinan Shield and the WD & HO Wills Cup during the season, which culminated in a grand final between South Sydney and Manly-Warringah.

== Season summary ==
The 1968 season saw the introduction of an official Best and Fairest Player award in the form of the Rothmans Medal. The inaugural medal was won by Cronulla-Sutherland's Terry Hughes.

The Balmain club narrowly missed out on a place in the top four, which was made up of South Sydney, Manly-Warringah, St. George and Eastern Suburbs.

=== Teams ===
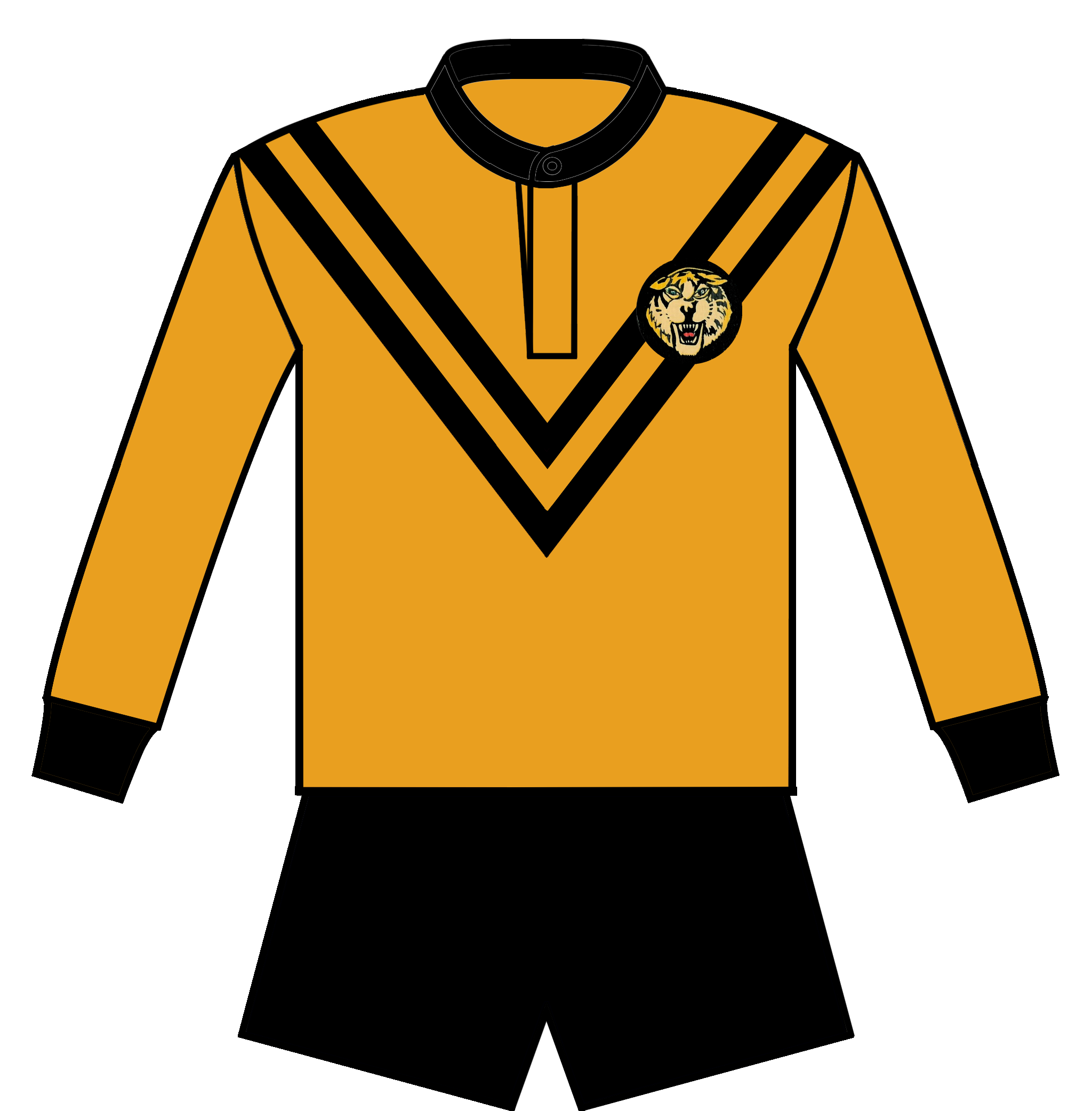
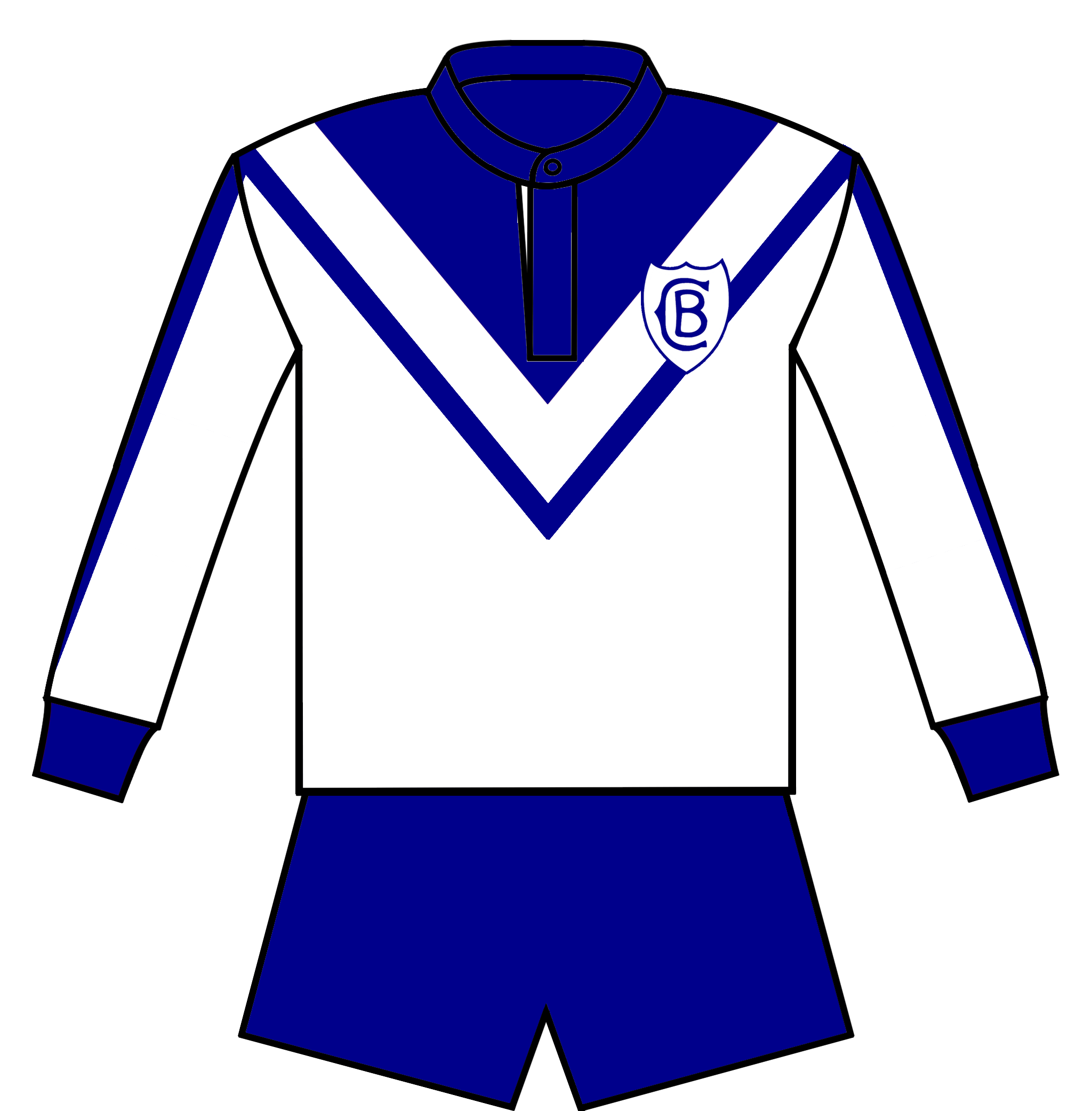
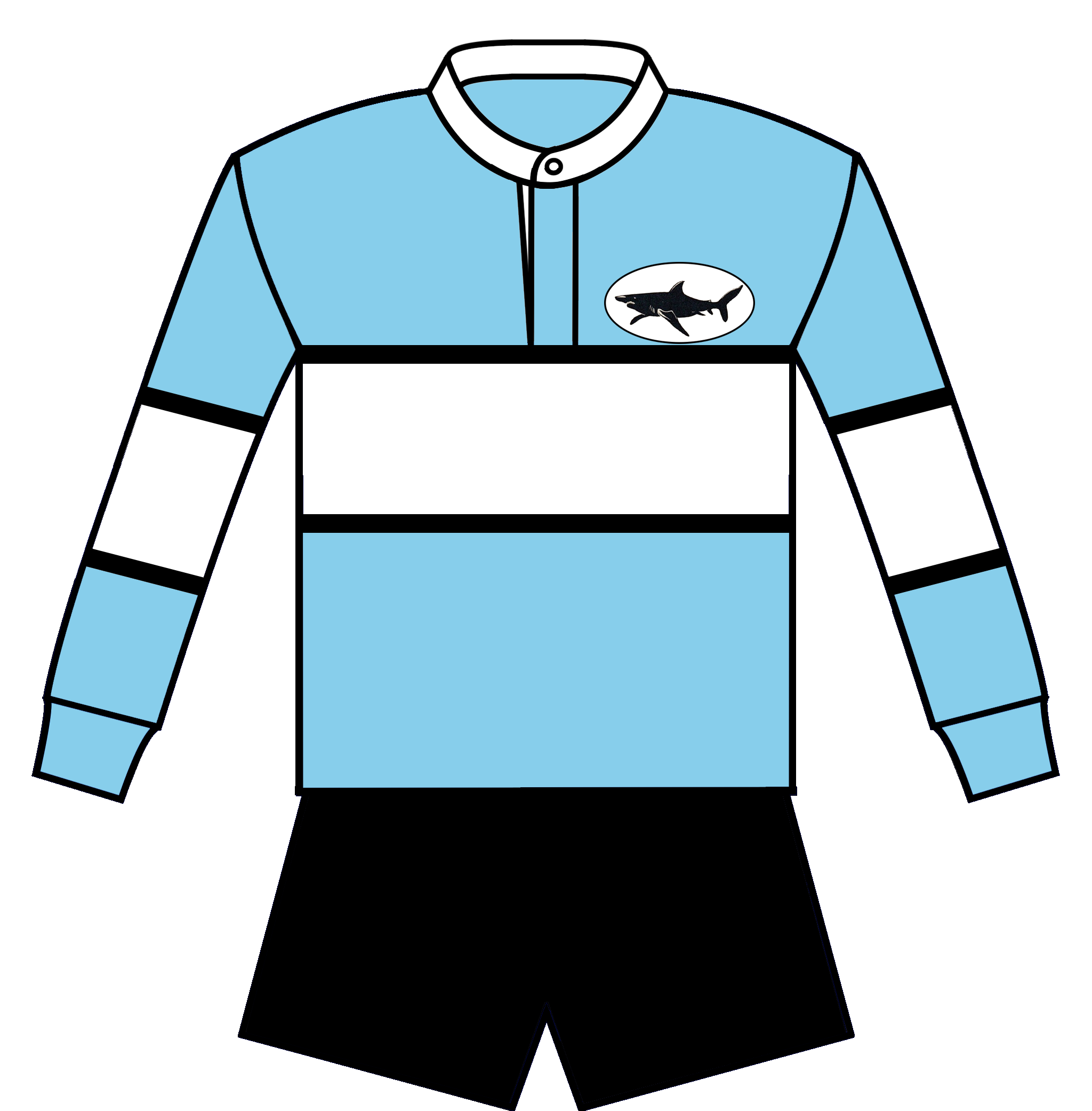
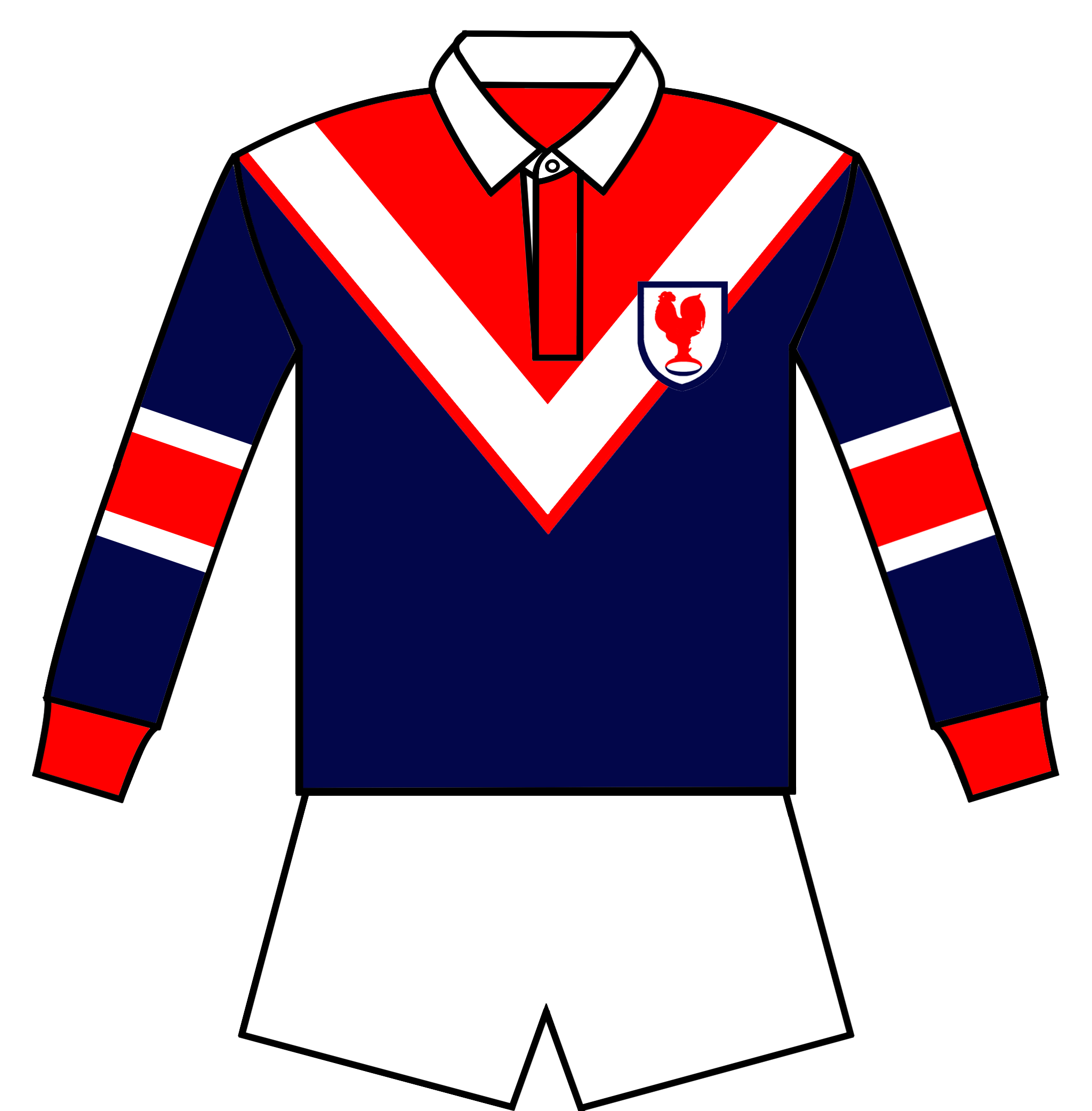
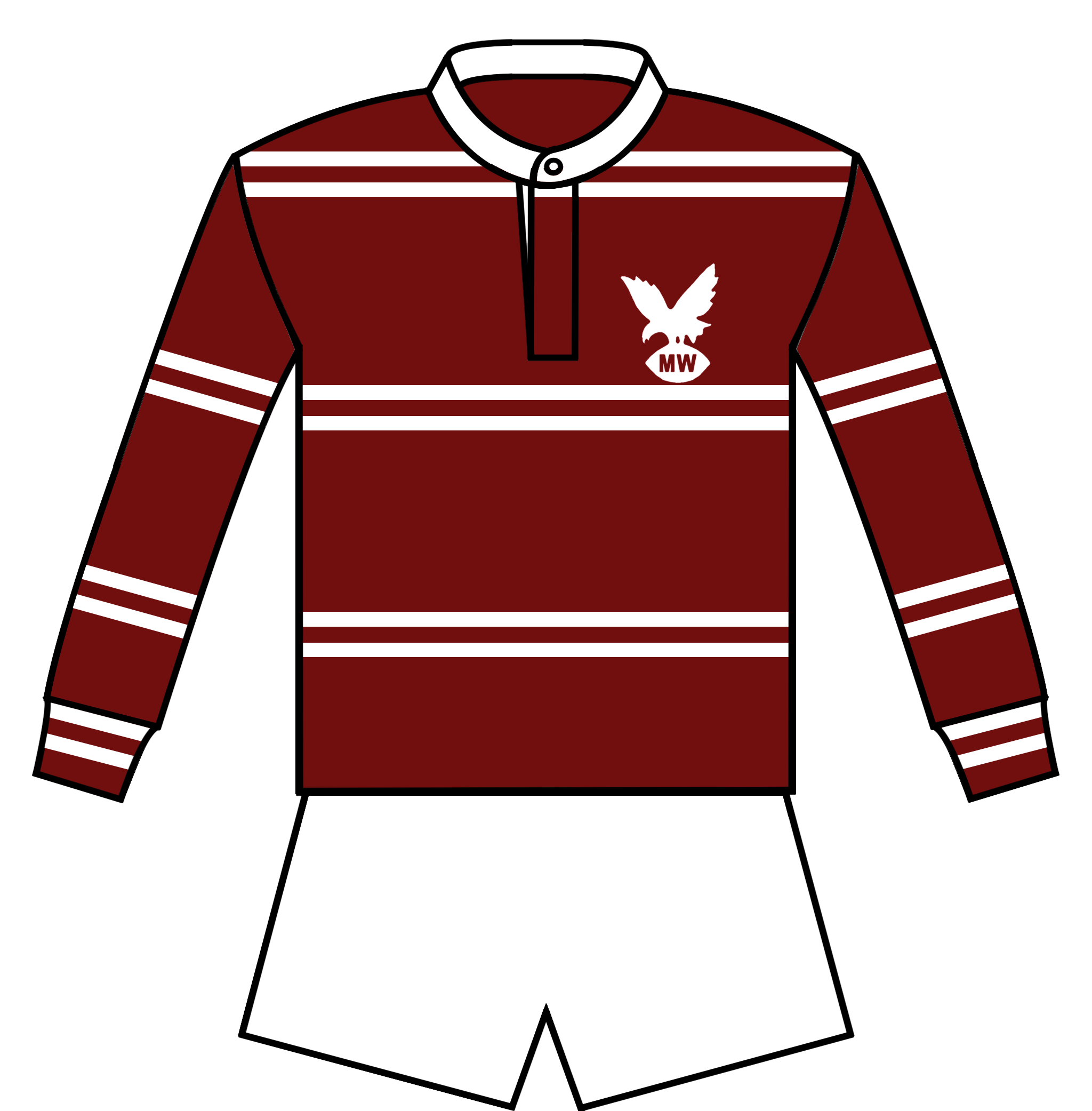
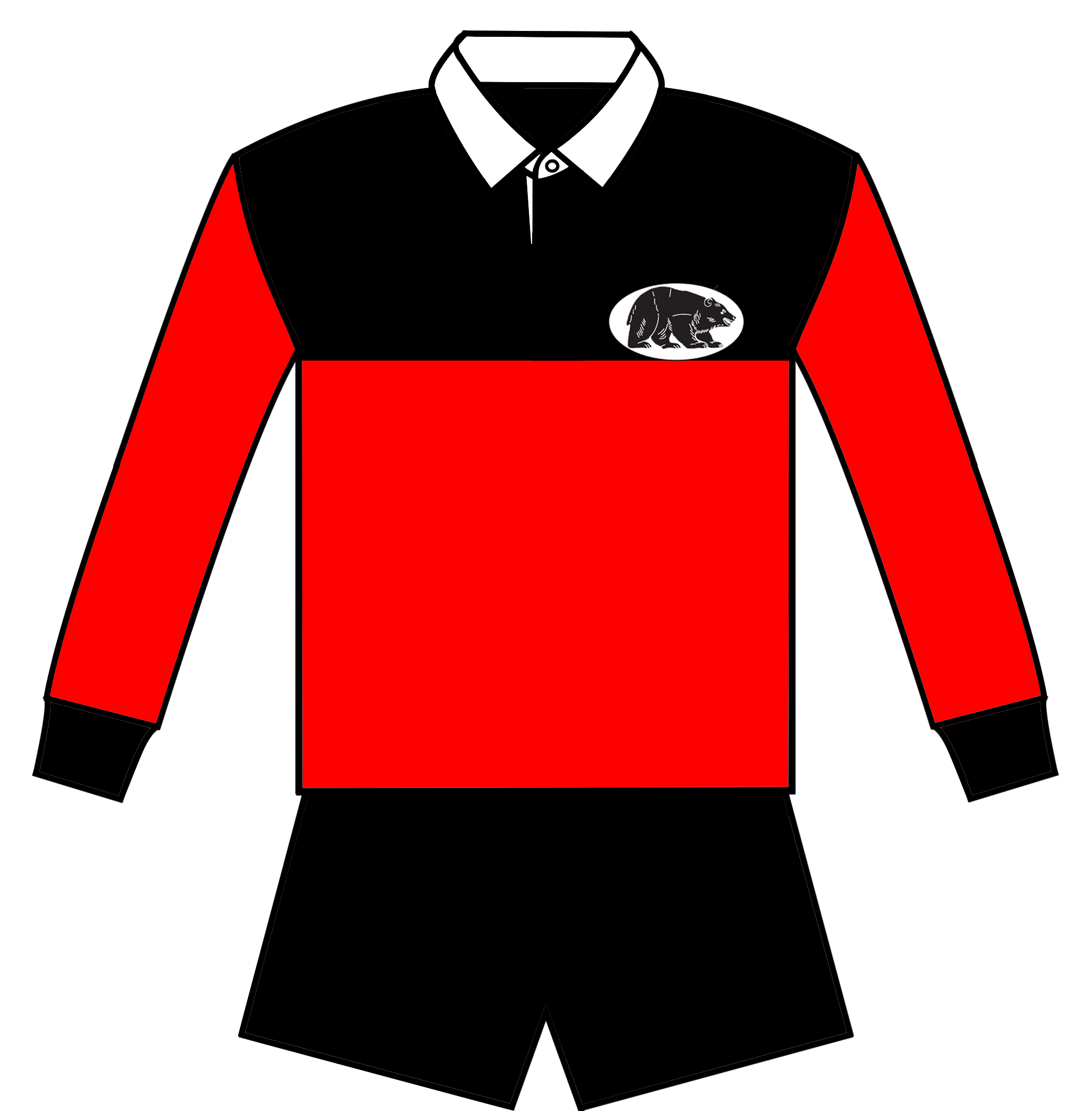
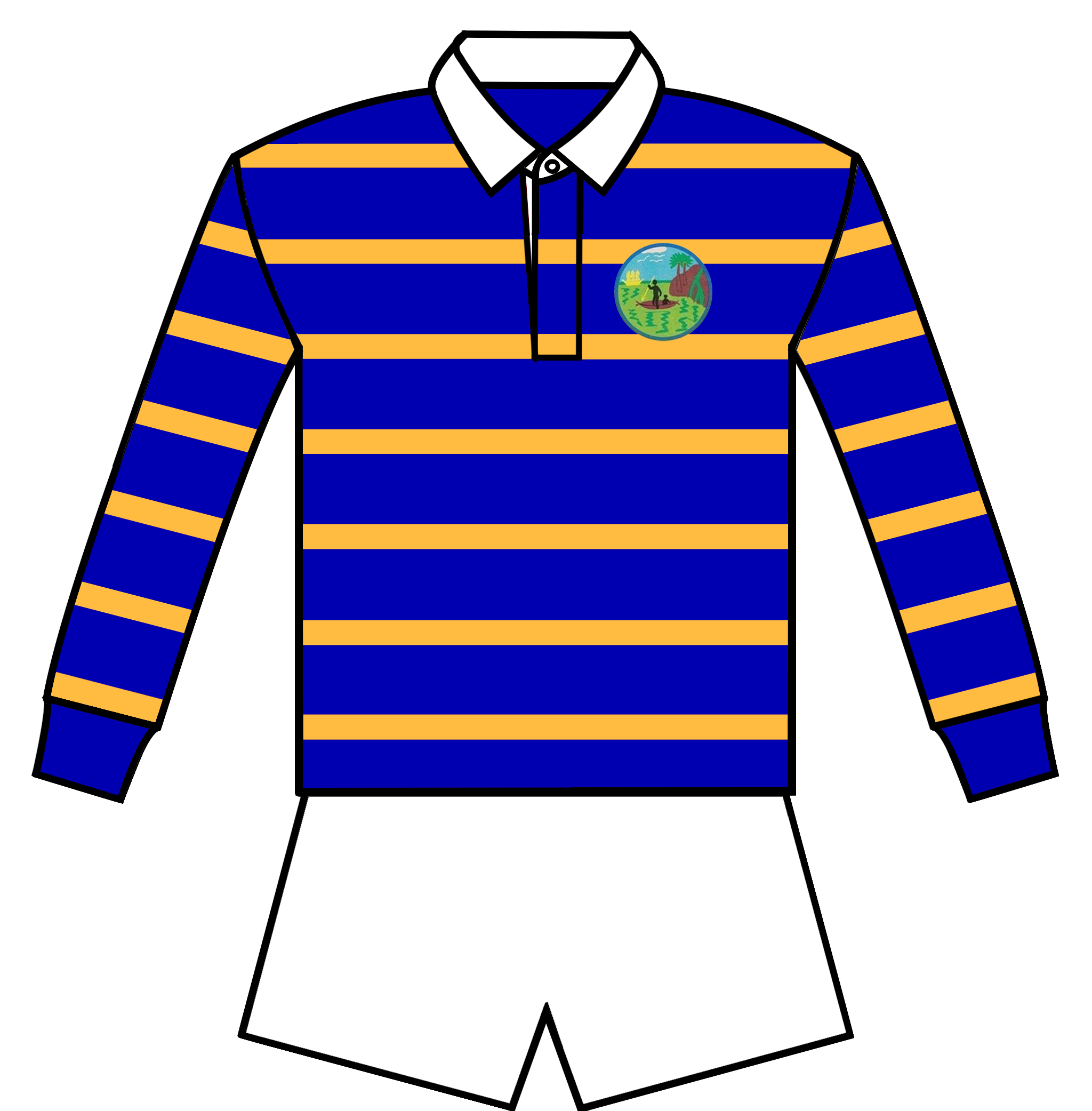
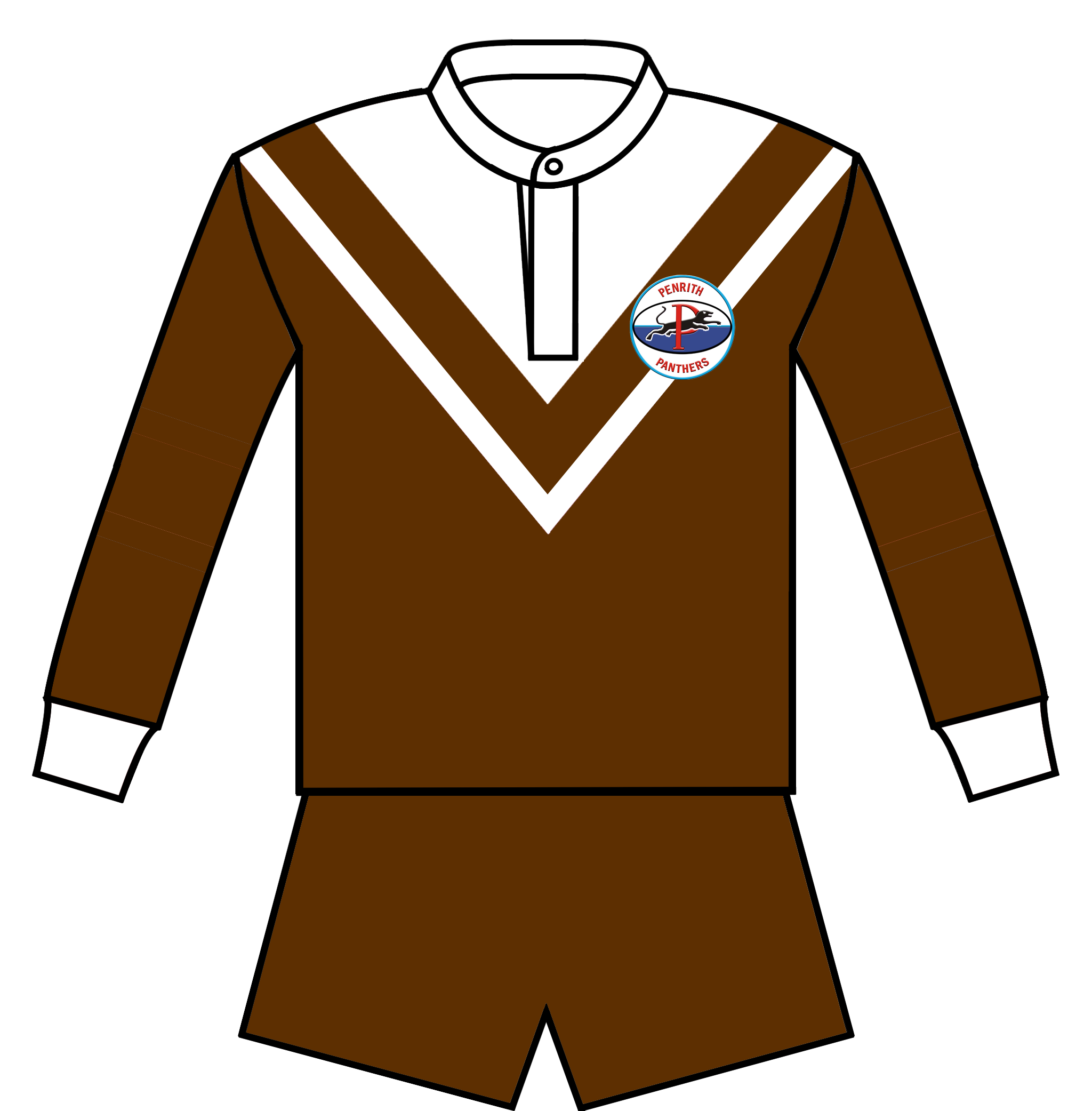
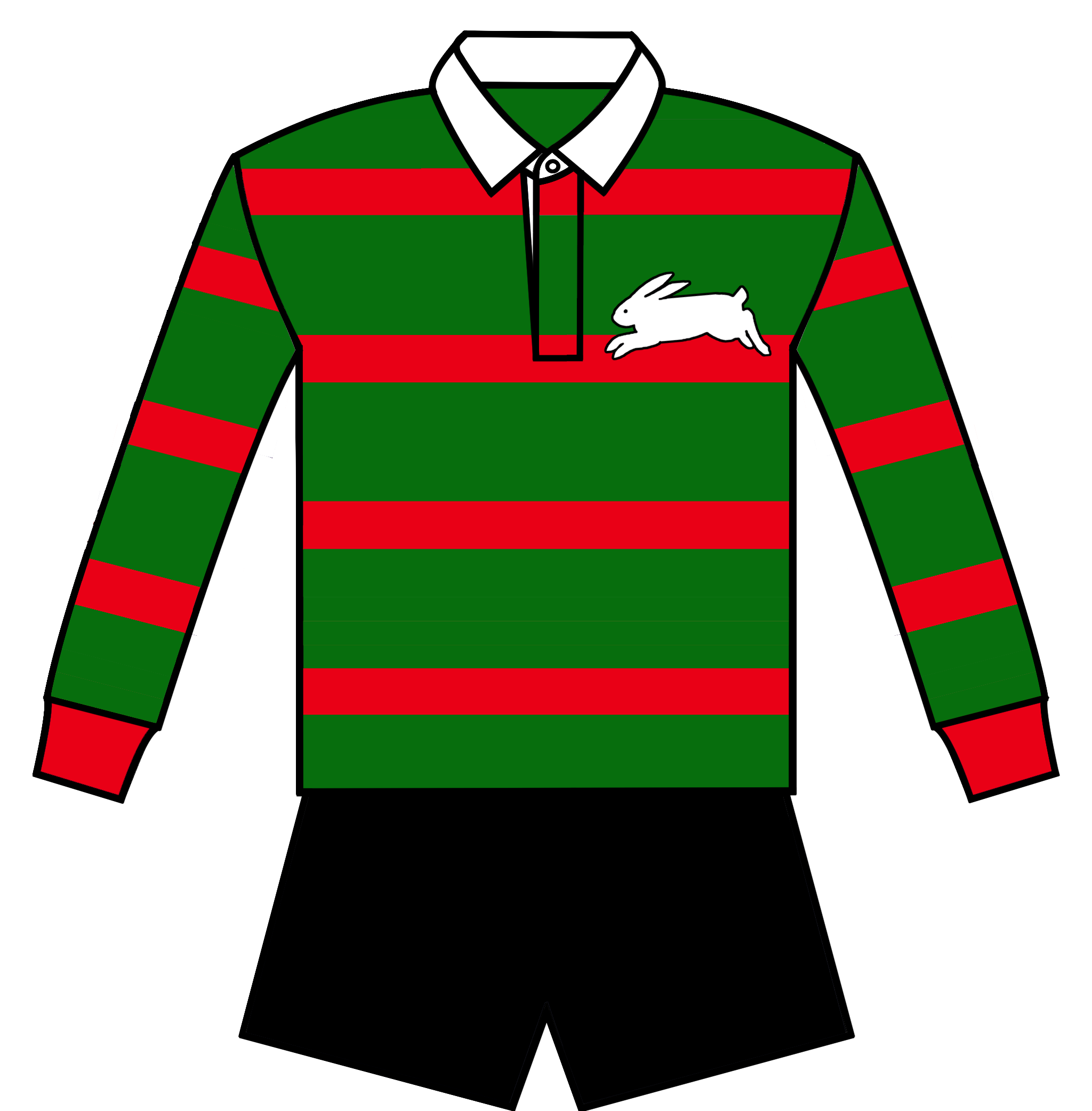
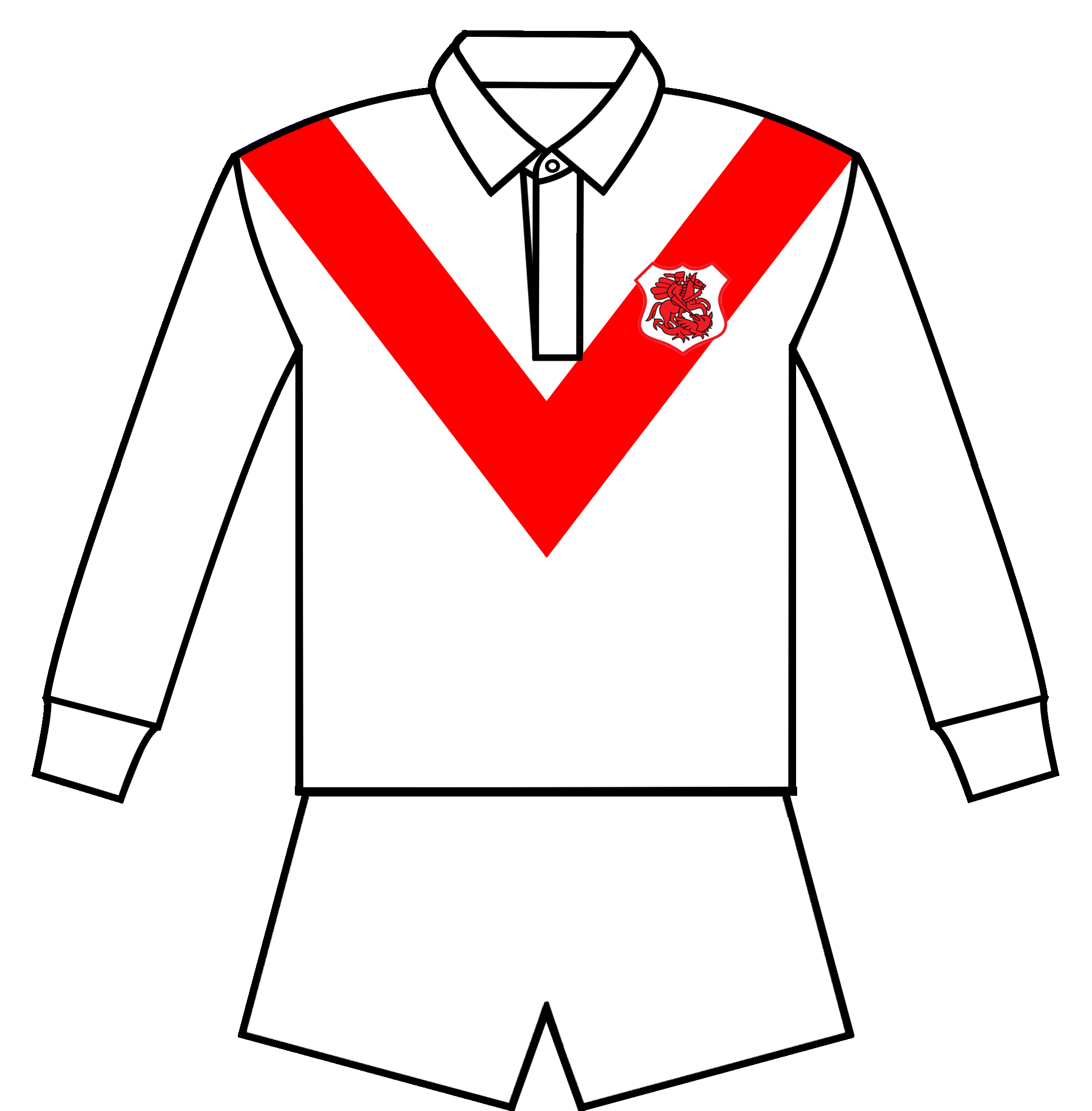
Balmain 61st season Ground: Leichhardt Oval; Captain-Coach: Keith Barnes	Canterbury-Bankstown 34th season Ground: Belmore Sports Ground; Captain-coach: Kevin Ryan	Cronulla-Sutherland 2nd season Ground: Endeavour Field; Coach: Ken Kearney; Captain: Warren Ryan	Eastern Suburbs 61st season Ground: Sydney Sports Ground; Coach: Jack Gibson; Captain: Jim Matthews
Manly-Warringah 22nd season Ground: Brookvale Oval; Coach: George Hunter; Captain: Bob Fulton	Newtown 61st season Ground: Henson Park; Coach: Dick Poole; Captain: Bobby Keyes	North Sydney 61st season Ground: North Sydney Oval; Captain-coach: Colin Greenwood	Parramatta 22nd season Ground: Cumberland Oval; Coach: Ian Johnston; Captain: Dick Thornett
Penrith 2nd season Ground: Penrith Park; Captain-Coach: Bob Boland	South Sydney 61st season Ground: Redfern Oval; Coach: Clive Churchill; Captain: John Sattler	St. George 48th season Ground: Jubilee Oval; Coach: Norm Provan; Captain: Johnny Raper	Western Suburbs 61st season Ground: Lidcombe Oval; Captain-coach: Noel Kelly

=== Ladder ===
	Team	Pld	W	D	L	PF	PA	PD	Pts
1	South Sydney	22	16	0	6	394	271	+123	32
2	Manly	22	15	1	6	379	282	+97	31
3	St. George	22	13	3	6	416	320	+96	29
4	Eastern Suburbs	22	14	1	7	362	274	+88	29
5	Balmain	22	14	0	8	393	284	+109	28
6	Parramatta	22	12	1	9	308	284	+24	25
7	Western Suburbs	22	12	0	10	328	279	+49	24
8	Penrith	22	11	0	11	298	352	-54	22
9	Canterbury	22	9	1	12	259	301	-42	19
10	Cronulla	22	6	0	16	259	405	-146	12
11	North Sydney	22	4	0	18	259	388	-129	8
12	Newtown	22	2	1	19	257	472	-215	5

== Finals ==
Home	Score	Away	Match Information
Home	Score	Away	Date and Time	Venue	Referee	Crowd
Semi-finals
St. George	17–10	Eastern Suburbs Roosters	31 August 1968	Sydney Cricket Ground	Col Pearce	49,747
South Sydney	15–23	Manly-Warringah	7 September 1968	Sydney Cricket Ground	Col Pearce	49,128
Preliminary Final
South Sydney	20–8	St. George	14 September 1968	Sydney Cricket Ground	Col Pearce	44,803
Grand Final
Manly-Warringah	9–13	South Sydney	21 September 1968	Sydney Cricket Ground	Col Pearce	54,255

=== Grand Final ===
Manly-Warringah Sea Eagles	Position	South Sydney Rabbitohs
1. Bob Batty	FB	1. Eric Simms
2. Michael McLean	WG	2. Brian James
3. Alec Tennant	CE	3. Bob Honan
4. Frank Stanton	CE	4. Arthur Branighan
5. Les Hanigan	WG	5. Michael Cleary
6. Bob Fulton (c)	FE	6. Denis Pittard
7. Denis Ward	HB	7. Bob Grant
13. Bill Hamilton	PR	13. Jim Morgan
12. Fred Jones	HK	12. Elwyn Walters
11. Norm Pounder	PR	11. John O'Neill
10. David Knox	SR	19. John Sattler (c)
9. John Morgan	SR	9. Bob Moses
8. Bill Bradstreet	LK	8. Ron Coote
	Res.	
George Hunter	Coach	Clive Churchill

Manly was making its fourth ever Grand Final appearance and still looking for its first title. 21-year-old captain Bob Fulton led a young Sea Eagles side, while Souths was skippered by John Sattler who that season had been honoured as "Catholic Sportsman of the Year". Neither team lineup had any players older than 29 years of age. The depth of the Souths line-up was indicated by the fact that it's stars Kevin Longbottom, Bob McCarthy and Ray Branighan were all named and played in the Rabbitohs' reserve grade side which ominously won its grand final match-up also against Manly.

The first-grade match began furiously with the toughening-up period resulting in four cautions by referee Pearce in the first four minutes. Ron Coote clashed with Bill Bradstreet and the opposing giants Hamilton and John O'Neill also measured up. Souths, with a strong breeze at its back, was the first to score when Michael Cleary intercepted a pass meant for Manly winger Les Hanigan and raced 80 yards to score. Simms punished Manly with a conversion and three successful penalty goals in the first half and at the break Souths led 11–2.

The Sea Eagles refused to lay down and mid-way through the second half second-rower John Morgan crashed over for a try which was converted by Bob Batty. Then a Bob Fulton field goal with fourteen minutes left brought Manly within reach. But despite the Manly fightback Souths was too resilient and hung on to win its second successive premiership and the club's 18th title.

South Sydney 13 (Tries: Cleary. Goals: Simms 5.)

Manly-Warringah 9 (Tries: Morgan. Goals: Batty 2. Fld Goals: Fulton 1.)

== Player statistics ==
The following statistics are as of the conclusion of Round 22.

Top 5 point scorers

Points	Player	Tries	Goals	Field Goals
184	Eric Simms	0	65	27
181	Dennis Preston	7	80	0
167	Terry Hughes	7	67	6
152	Len Killeen	8	64	0
136	Allan McKean	0	67	1

Top 5 try scorers

Tries	Player
20	Stan Gorton
13	Les Hanigan
12	Mick Alchin
11	George Ruebner
9	Ron Coote
9	Bob Mara
9	Johnny Rhodes

Top 5 goal scorers

Goals	Player
80	Dennis Preston
67	Allan McKean
67	Terry Hughes
65	Eric Simms
64	Len Killeen
