= 1971 Cronulla-Sutherland Sharks season =

- NSWRFL rank: 7th
- 1971 record: Wins: 10; draws: 0; losses: 12
- Points scored: For: 352 (66 tries, 77 goals); against: 310 (62 tries, 62 goals)

Team information
- Coach: Tommy Bishop
- Captain: Tommy Bishop Kevin Hogan Ron Turner Greg Pierce
- Stadium: Endeavour Field
- Avg. attendance: 7,699

Top scorers
- Tries: Ray Corcoran (17)
- Goals: Dave Cotter (27); George Taylforth (27)
- Points: Dave Cotter (78)
← 1970	1972 →

The 1971 Cronulla-Sutherland Sharks season was the 5th in club's history. They competed in the NSWRFL's 1971 premiership. The Sharks also won the Endeavour Cup this year. The Endeavour Cup competition was only run for two years, it was a knockout competition involving the teams that didn't make the final five for that year. The trophy was recently found at the club thanks to a request from life member Andrew Downie.

== Ladder ==
	Team	Pld	W	D	L	PF	PA	PD	Pts
1	Manly-Warringah	22	19	0	3	528	260	+268	38
2	South Sydney	22	17	0	5	499	308	+191	34
3	St. George	22	15	1	6	392	283	+109	31
4	Parramatta	22	12	0	10	383	355	+28	24
5	Balmain	22	11	0	11	366	398	-32	22
6	Canterbury-Bankstown	22	11	0	11	355	422	-87	22
7	Cronulla-Sutherland	22	10	0	12	352	310	+42	20
8	Penrith	22	10	0	12	283	372	-89	20
9	Eastern Suburbs	22	9	1	12	344	339	+5	19
10	Newtown	22	7	1	14	282	401	-119	15
11	North Sydney	22	5	1	16	265	446	-181	11
12	Western Suburbs	22	4	0	18	336	471	-135	8
