= 1969 Cronulla-Sutherland Sharks season =

- NSWRFL rank: 12th
- 1969 record: Wins: 5; draws: 0; losses: 17
- Points scored: For: 301 (49 tries, 70 goals, 7 field goals); against: 448 (84 tries, 90 goals, 8 field goals)

Team information
- Coach: Ken Kearney
- Captain: Noel Thornton Graeme Wilson
- Stadium: Endeavour Field
- Avg. attendance: 7,157

Top scorers
- Tries: Paul Taylor (7)
- Goals: Terry Hughes (36)
- Points: Terry Hughes (80)
← 1968	1970 →

The 1969 Cronulla-Sutherland Sharks season was the 3rd in the club's history. They competed in the NSWRFL's 1969 premiership.

== Ladder ==
	Team	Pld	W	D	L	PF	PA	PD	Pts
1	South Sydney	22	18	0	4	489	222	+267	36
2	Balmain	22	17	0	5	410	304	+106	34
3	St. George	22	14	0	8	411	323	+88	28
4	Manly-Warringah	22	14	0	8	355	298	+57	28
5	Western Suburbs	22	11	0	11	315	288	+27	22
6	Parramatta	22	11	0	11	323	338	-15	22
7	North Sydney	22	10	1	11	343	362	-19	21
8	Canterbury-Bankstown	22	10	0	12	316	349	-33	20
9	Eastern Suburbs	22	8	1	13	307	409	-102	17
10	Penrith	22	6	1	15	311	398	-87	13
11	Newtown	22	6	1	15	279	421	-142	13
12	Cronulla-Sutherland	22	5	0	17	301	448	-147	10
