= 1970 Cronulla-Sutherland Sharks season =

- NSWRFL rank: 7th
- 1970 record: Wins: 9; draws: 0; losses: 13
- Points scored: For: 374 (58 tries, 98 goals, 2 field goals); against: 335 (59 tries, 69 goals, 10 field goals)

Team information
- Coach: Tommy Bishop
- Captain: Graeme Wilson George Taylforth Tommy Bishop
- Stadium: Endeavour Field
- Avg. attendance: 6,957

Top scorers
- Tries: Tommy Bishop (9)
- Goals: George Taylforth (95)
- Points: George Taylforth (202)
← 1969	1971 →

The 1970 Cronulla-Sutherland Sharks season was the 4th in the club's history. They competed in the NSWRFL's 1970 premiership.

== Ladder ==
	Team	Pld	W	D	L	PF	PA	PD	Pts
1	South Sydney	22	17	1	4	479	273	+206	35
2	Manly-Warringah	22	16	1	5	422	285	+137	33
3	St. George	22	15	0	7	408	329	+79	30
4	Canterbury-Bankstown	22	14	0	8	308	269	+39	28
5	Eastern Suburbs	22	13	0	9	386	320	+66	26
6	Balmain	22	12	1	9	380	347	+33	25
7	Cronulla-Sutherland	22	9	0	13	374	335	+39	18
8	Newtown	22	9	0	13	345	409	-64	18
9	North Sydney	22	7	1	14	332	435	-103	15
10	Penrith	22	7	1	14	292	406	-114	15
11	Western Suburbs	22	6	1	15	329	403	-74	13
12	Parramatta	22	4	0	18	240	484	-244	8
