= 1967 NSWRFL season =

Rugby league competition

1967 New South Wales Rugby Football League
- Teams: 12
- Premiers: South Sydney (17th title)
- Minor premiers: St. George (13th title)
- Matches played: 136
- Points scored: 3827
- Attendance: 1769881
- Top points scorer(s): Eric Simms (233)
- Wooden spoon: Cronulla-Sutherland (1st spoon)
- Top try-scorer(s): Les Hanigan (16)

The 1967 New South Wales Rugby Football League premiership was the 60th season of Sydney's professional rugby league football competition, Australia's first. The introduction of the Cronulla-Sutherland and Penrith clubs saw a total of twelve teams from across the Sydney area compete for the J.J. Giltinan Shield and WD & HO Wills Cup during the season, which culminated in a grand final between South Sydney and Canterbury-Bankstown. This was also the first live televised broadcast of a football grand final of any code in Australia.

== Season summary ==
The 1967 season was the first played under the limited tackle rule, replacing the unlimited tackle rule previously used since the code's 1908 inception. The number of tackles was four and would remain at that number for only four years before being increased to six in 1971.

Also this season Lidcombe Oval became the Western Suburbs club's homeground.

The twelve sides met each other twice in twenty-two regular premiership rounds before the top four teams battled out four finals. For the sixth consecutive season St. George finished as minor premiers. The two newcomers to the premiership, Penrith and Cronulla-Sutherland, finished the season second last and last respectively.

In 1967 the Nine Network reached agreement with the NSWRFL for a fee of $5,000 for TV broadcasting rights for the grand final.

South Sydney won their seventeenth premiership, defeating Canterbury-Bankstown in their first grand final since 1947. This finally spelled the end for St. George's monopoly on Grand Final wins which lasted over a decade, and commenced a new period of South Sydney dominance, during which they would win four premierships in a five-year period.

The 1967 season also saw the retirement from the League of future Australian Rugby League Hall of Fame inductee, Reg Gasnier.

=== Teams ===
1967 saw the NSWRFL expand to twelve teams with the introduction of the Penrith Panthers and Cronulla-Sutherland Sharks clubs. This was the first time the number of clubs had increased since 1947 and the first time ever the number of clubs competing totalled more than ten.

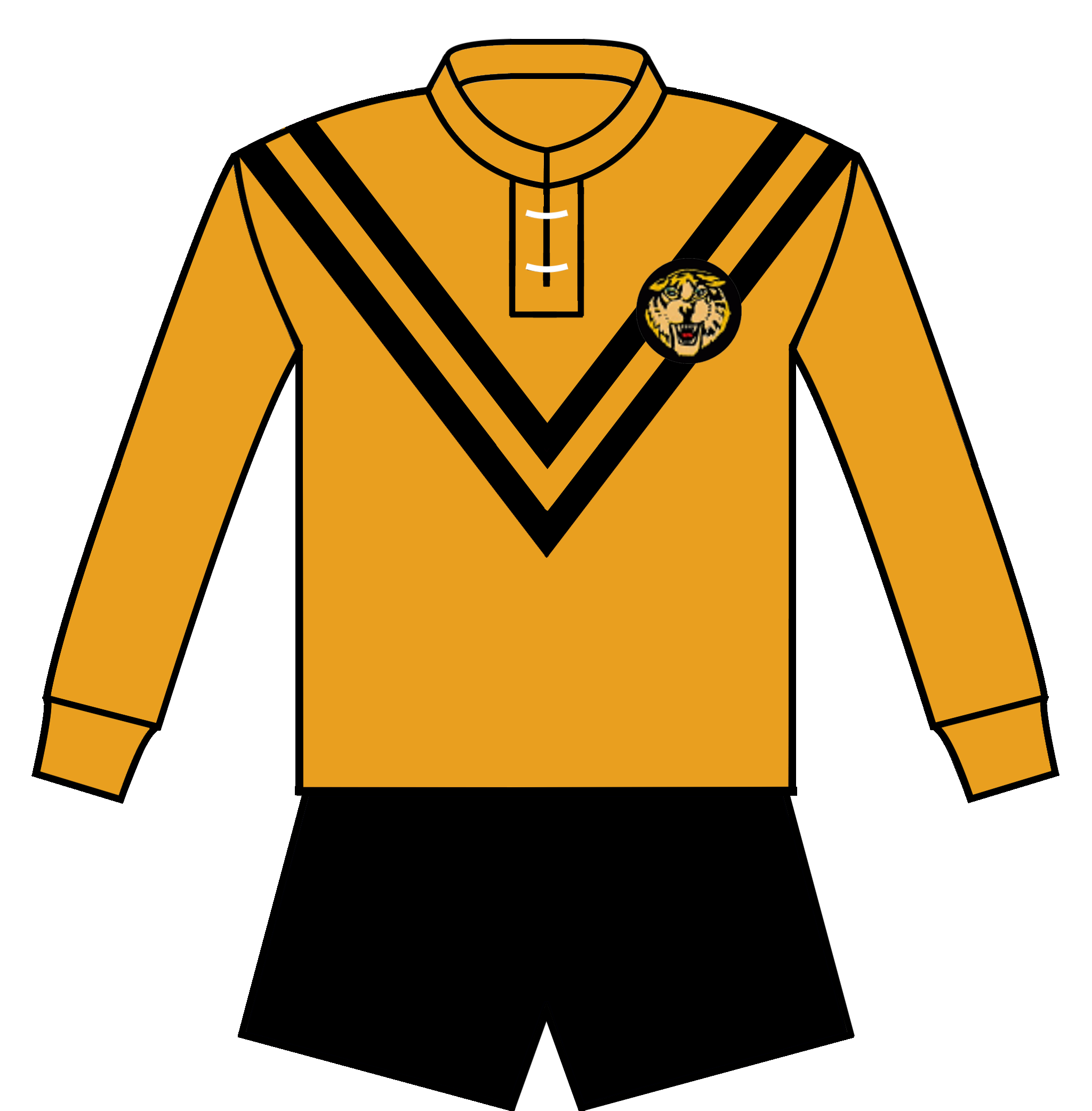
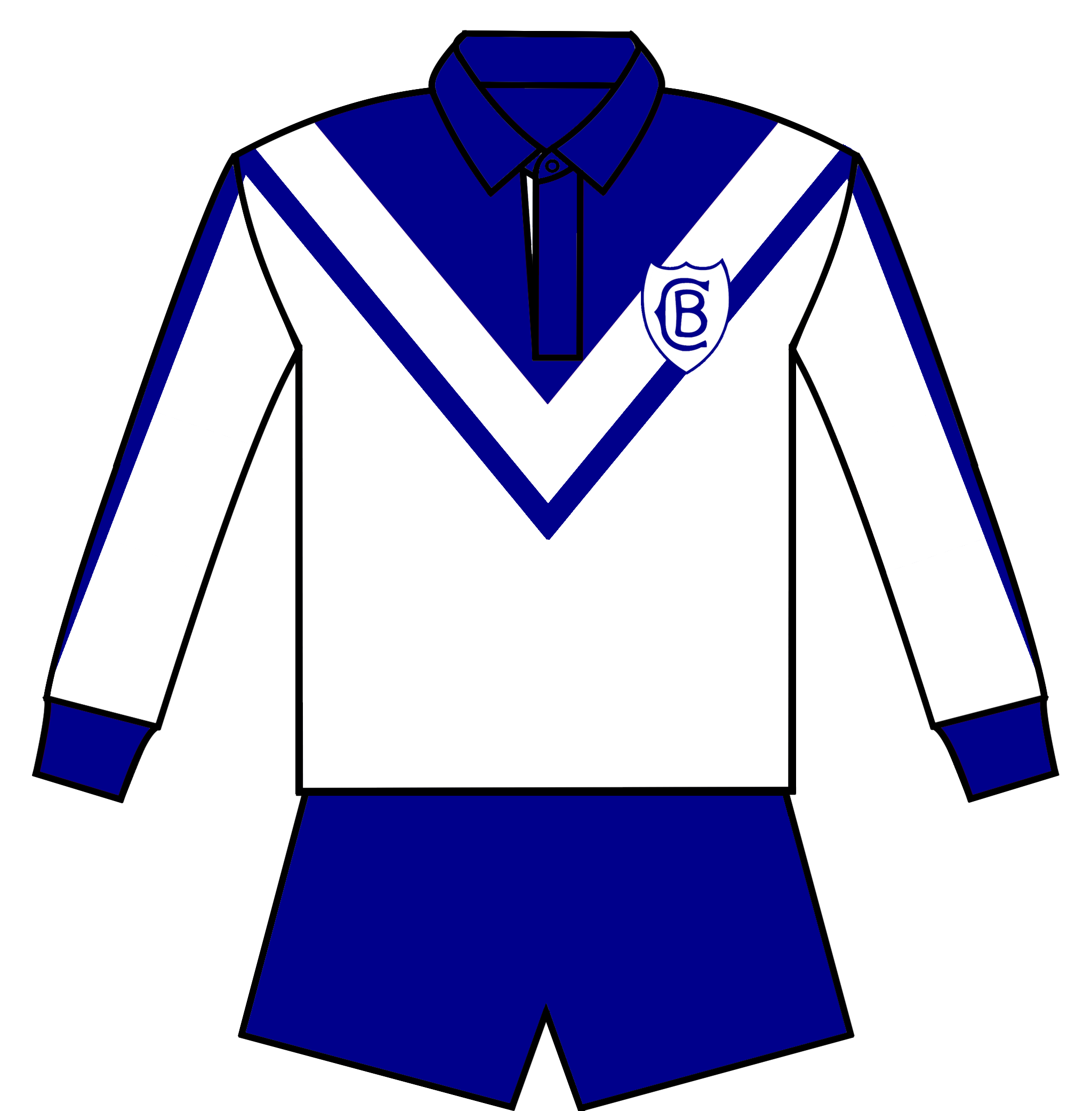
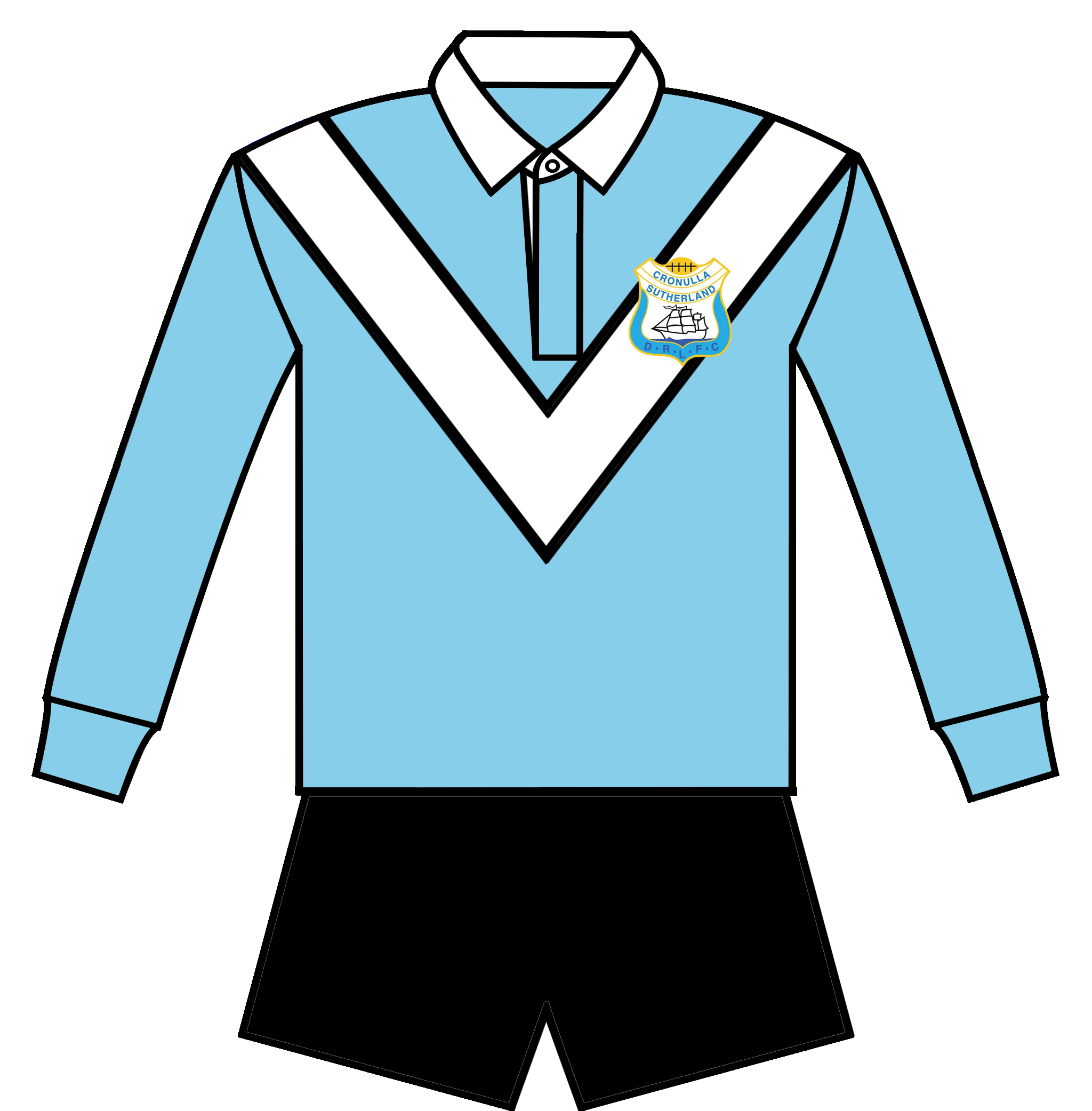
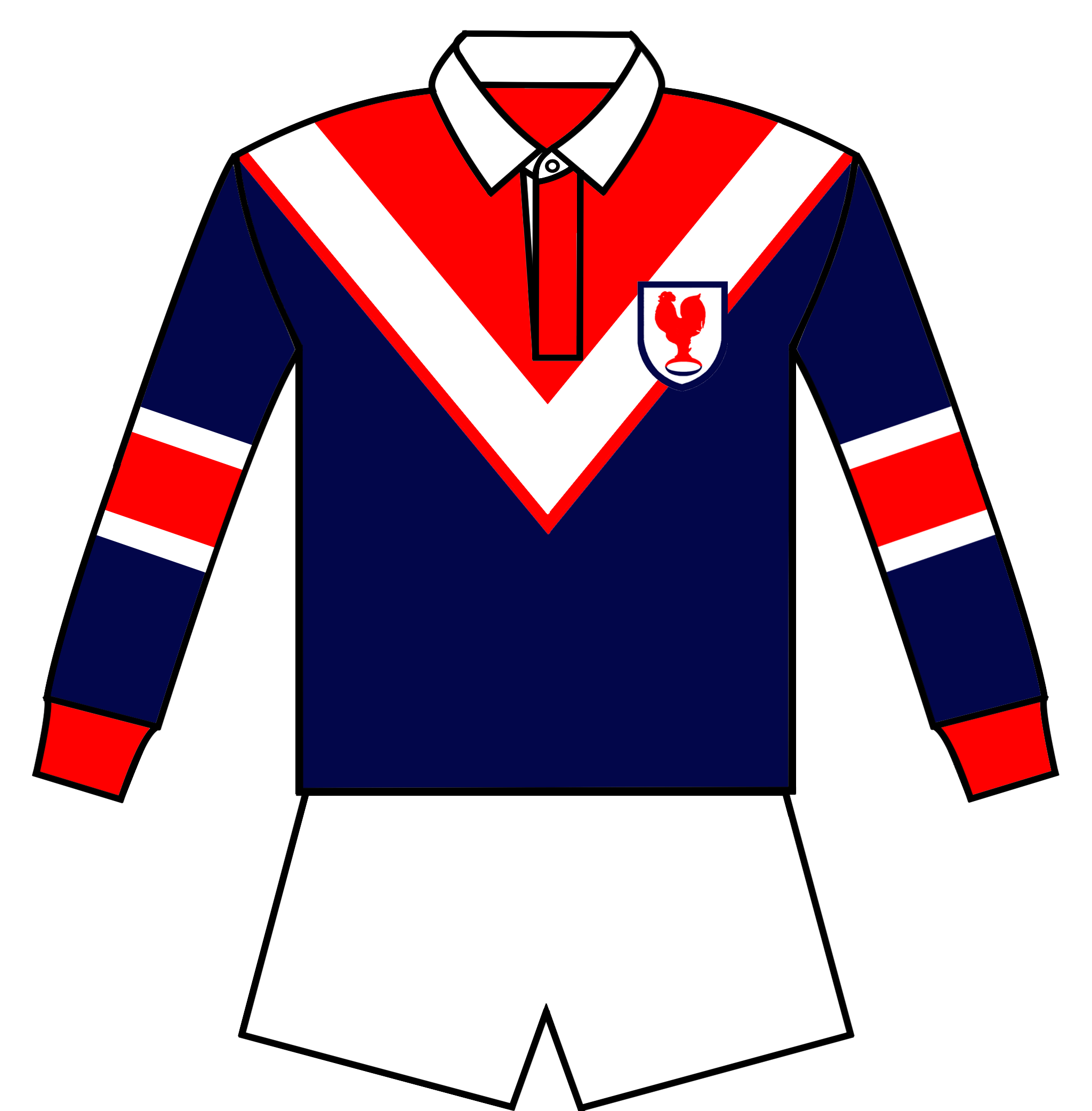
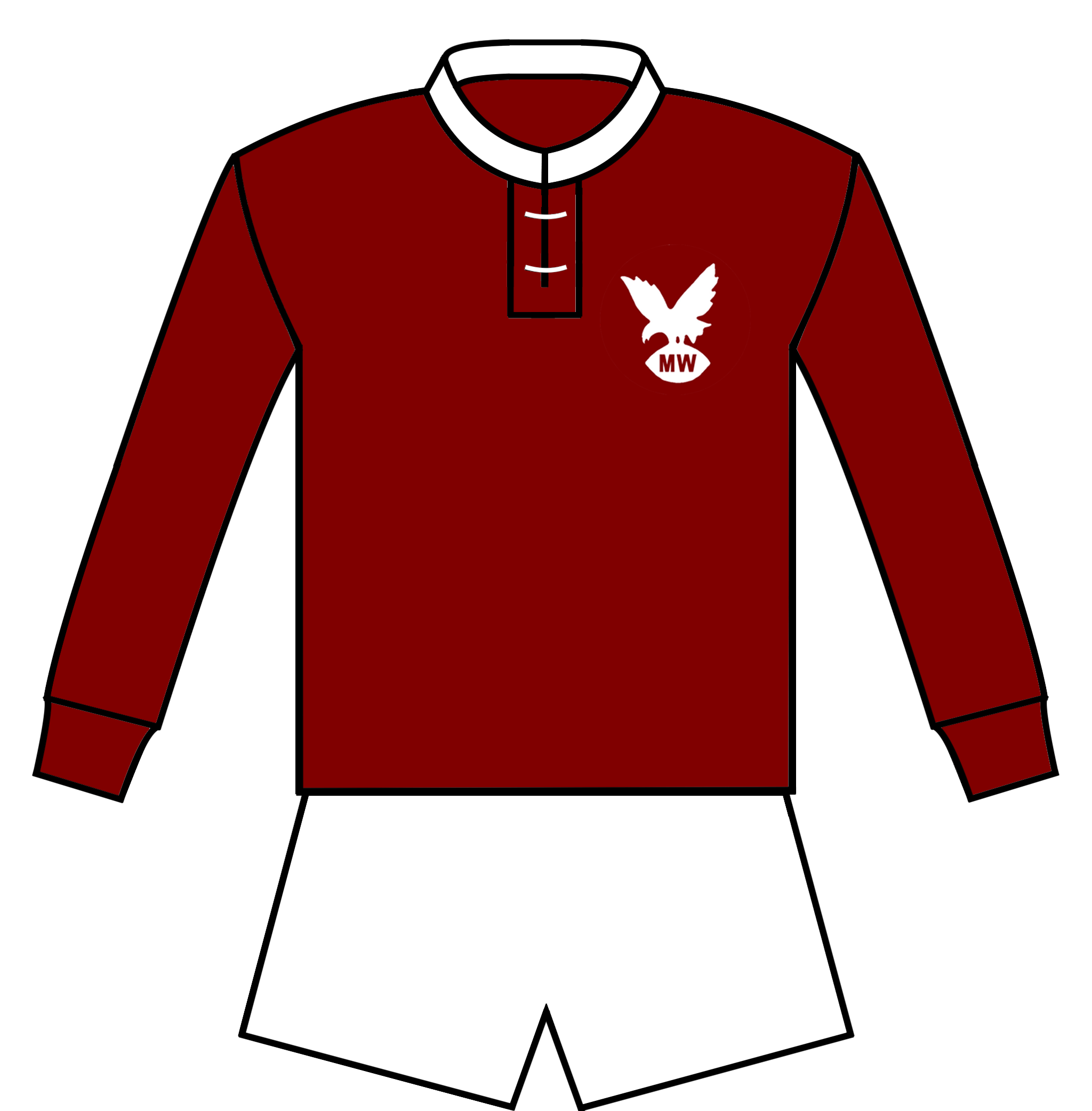
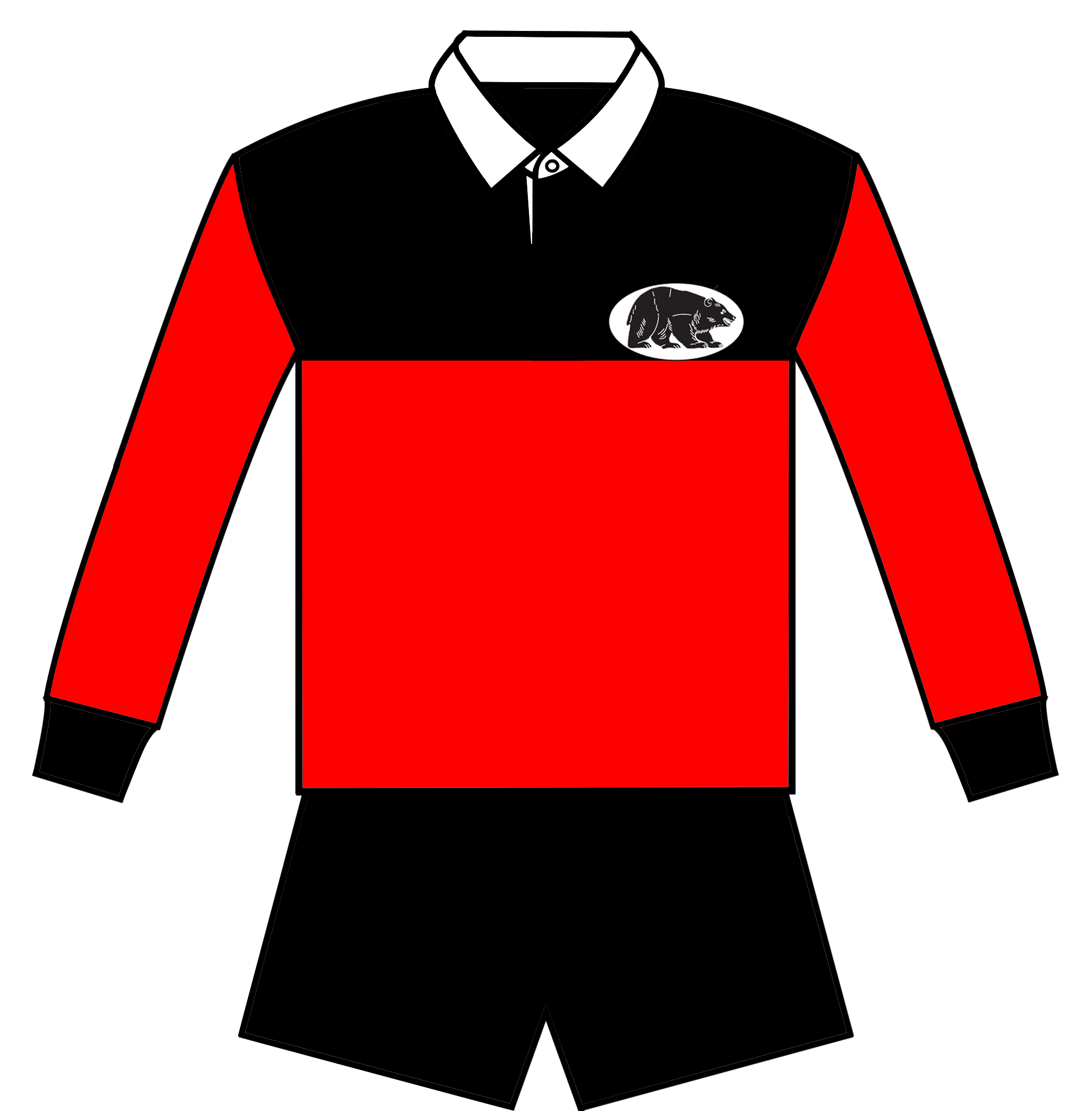
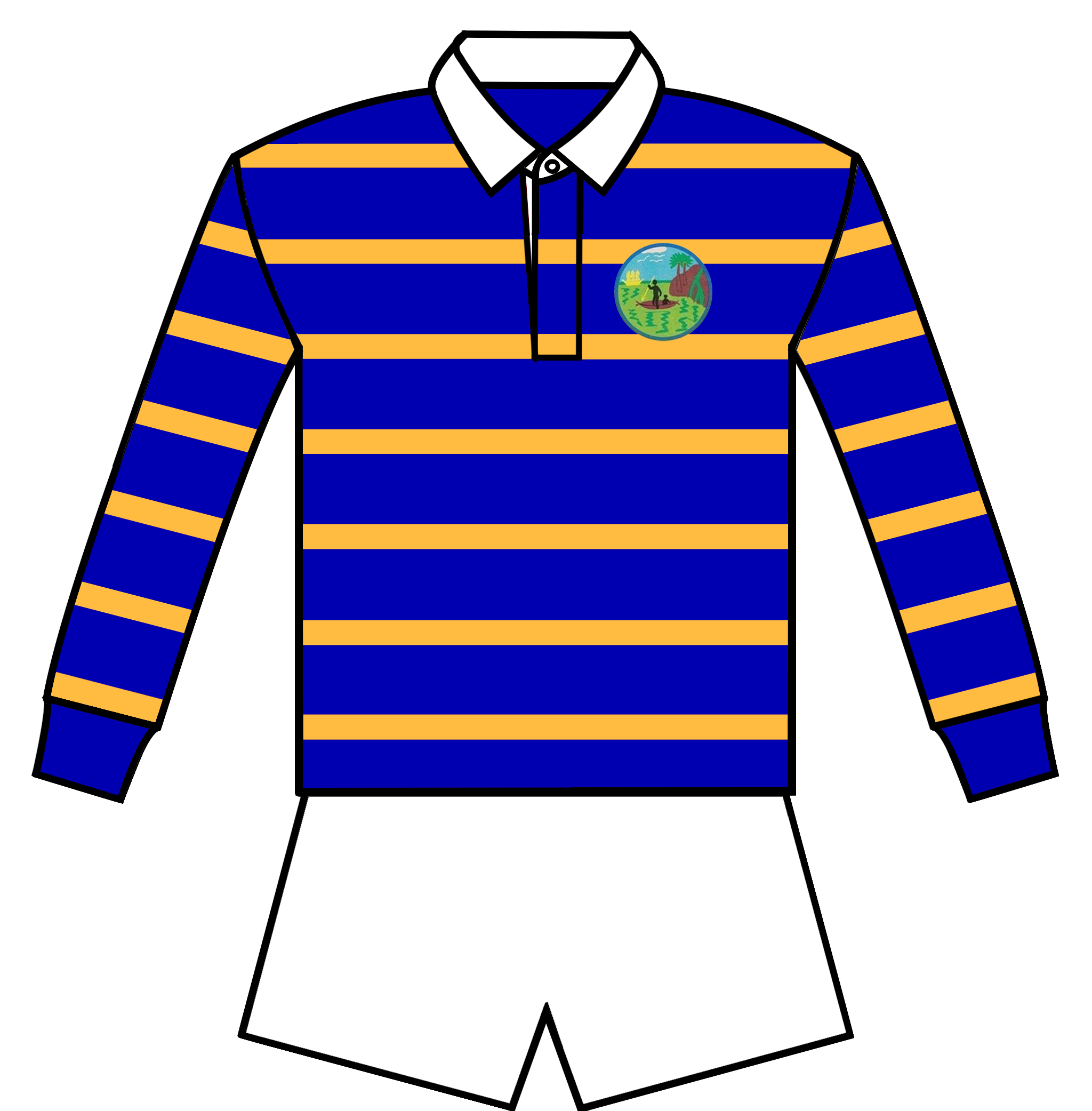
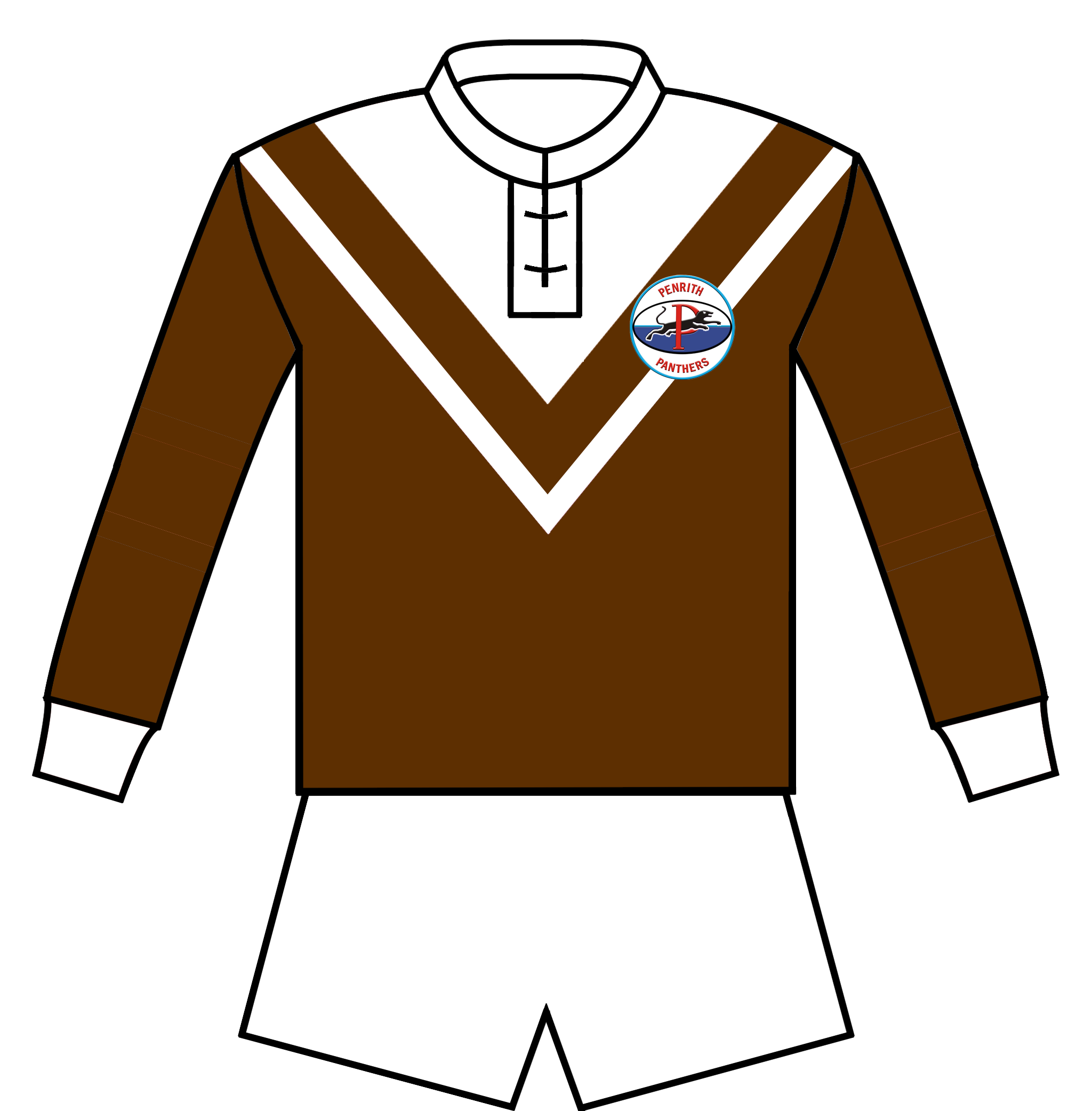
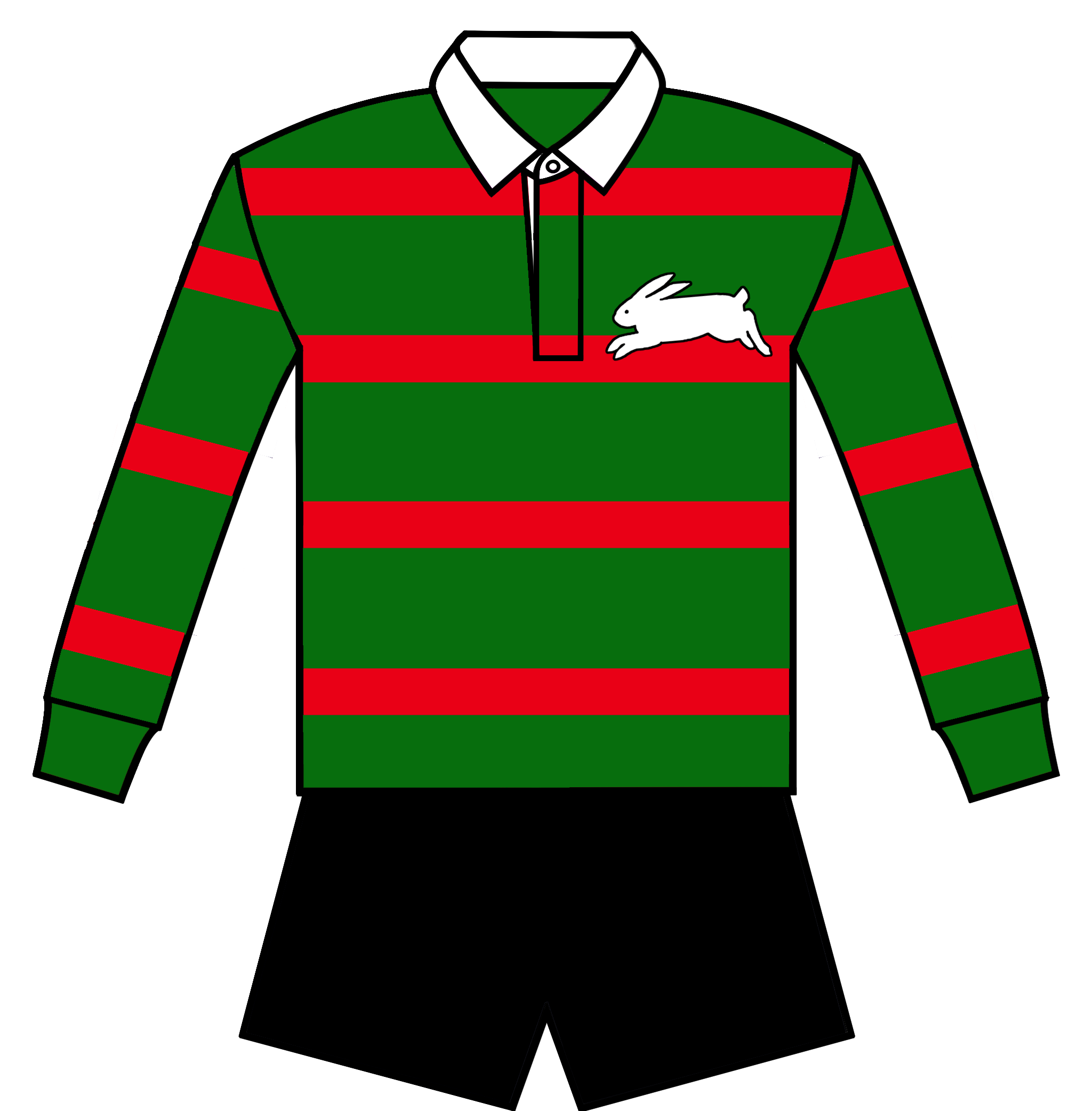
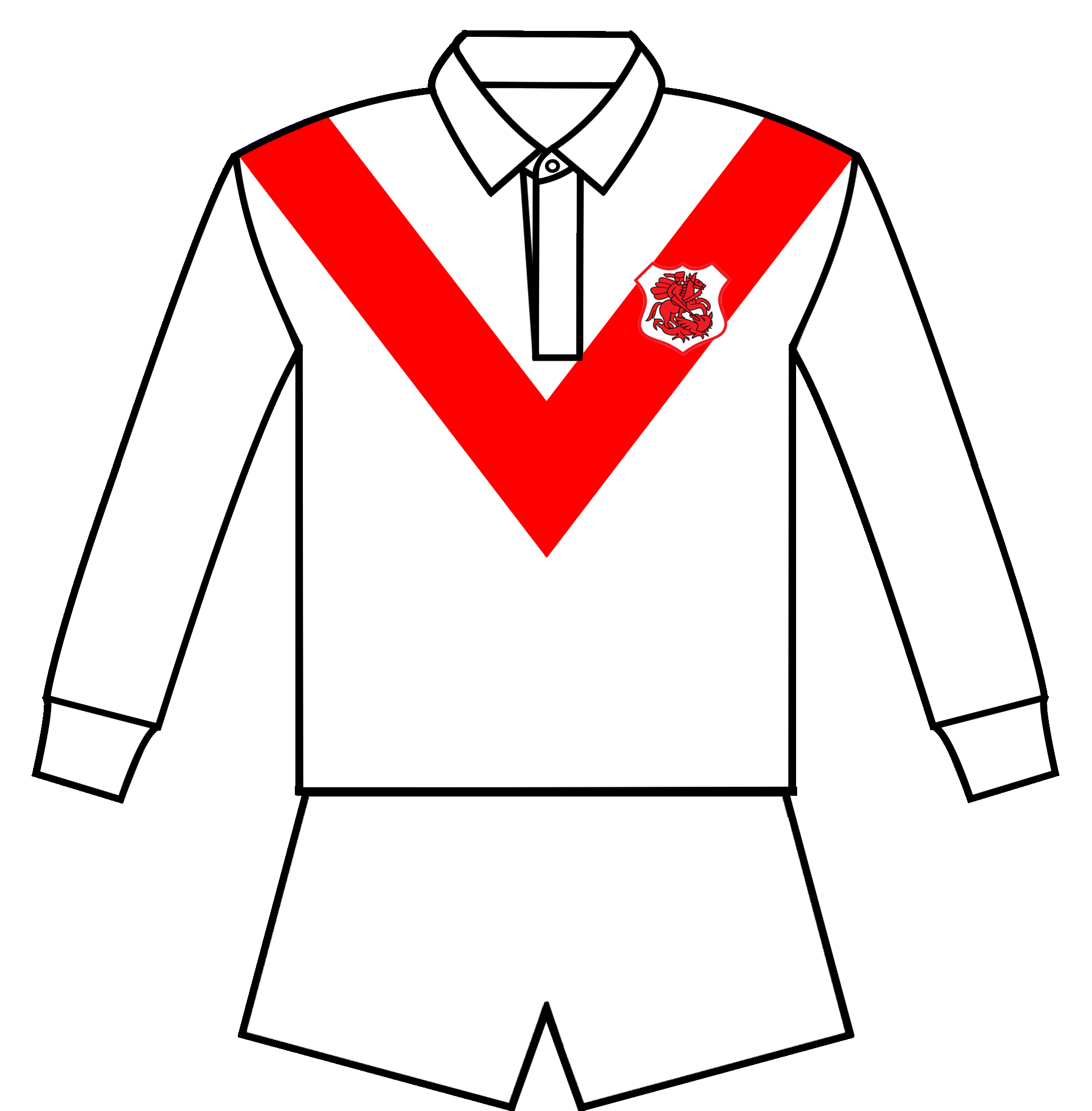
Balmain 60th season Ground: Leichhardt Oval; Captain-coach: Keith Barnes	Canterbury-Bankstown 33rd season Ground: Belmore Sports Ground; Captain-coach: Kevin Ryan	Cronulla-Sutherland 1st season Ground: Sutherland Oval; Coach: Ken Kearney; Captain: Monty Porter	Eastern Suburbs 60th season Ground: Sydney Sports Ground; Coach: Jack Gibson; Captain: Jim Matthews
Manly-Warringah 21st season Ground: Brookvale Oval; Coach: Wally O'Connell; Captain: Ken Day, Fred Jones	Newtown 60th season Ground: Henson Park; Coach: Dick Poole; Captain: Brian Graham	North Sydney 60th season Ground: North Sydney Oval; Coach: Billy Wilson; Captain: Colin Greenwood	Parramatta 21st season Ground: Cumberland Oval; Captain-coach: Brian Hambly
Penrith 1st season Ground: Penrith Stadium; Coach: Leo Trevena; Captain: Tony Brown→ Laurie Fagan	South Sydney 60th season Ground: Redfern Oval; Coach: Clive Churchill; Captain: John Sattler	St. George 47th season Ground: Kogarah Oval; Captain-Coach: Ian Walsh	Western Suburbs 60th season Ground: Lidcombe Oval; Captain-Coach: Noel Kelly

=== Ladder ===
	Team	Pld	W	D	L	PF	PA	PD	Pts
1	St. George	22	16	1	5	437	267	+170	33
2	South Sydney	22	16	0	6	422	271	+151	32
3	Canterbury	22	14	1	7	349	269	+80	29
4	Eastern Suburbs	22	13	2	7	269	219	+50	28
5	Manly	22	12	2	8	365	271	+94	26
6	Balmain	22	12	2	8	344	258	+86	26
7	Western Suburbs	22	10	2	10	269	255	+14	22
8	North Sydney	22	8	1	13	297	370	-73	17
9	Parramatta	22	8	0	14	309	322	-13	16
10	Newtown	22	7	2	13	274	406	-132	16
11	Penrith	22	5	2	15	203	352	-149	12
12	Cronulla	22	3	1	18	208	486	-278	7

== Finals ==
Home	Score	Away	Match Information
Home	Score	Away	Date and Time	Venue	Referee	Crowd
Semi-finals
Canterbury-Bankstown	13–2	Eastern Suburbs	26 August 1967	Sydney Cricket Ground	Col Pearce	47,186
St. George	8–13	South Sydney	2 September 1967	Sydney Cricket Ground	Col Pearce	51,915
Preliminary Final
St. George	11–12	Canterbury-Bankstown	9 September 1967	Sydney Cricket Ground	Col Pearce	49,941
Grand Final
South Sydney	12–10	Canterbury-Bankstown	16 September 1967	Sydney Cricket Ground	Col Pearce	56,358

=== Grand Final ===
South Sydney Rabbitohs	Position	Canterbury-Bankstown
1. Kevin Longbottom	FB	1. Les Johns
2. Michael Cleary	WG	2. Barry Reynolds
3. Bob Moses	CE	3. Bob Hagan
4. Eric Simms	CE	4. Johnny Greaves
5. Brian James	WG	5. Clive Gartner
6. Jim Lisle	FE	6. Bob Doyle
7. Ivan Jones	HB	7. Ross Kidd
13. John Sattler (c)	PR	13. Kevin Ryan
12. Elwyn Walters	HK	12. Col Brown
11. John O'Neill	PR	11. Kevin Ryan(c/coach)
10. Bob McCarthy	SR	10. Kevin Goldspink
9. Alan Scott	SR	9. George Taylforth
8. Ron Coote	LK	8. Ron Raper
Clive Churchill	Coach	

Live television broadcast coverage of grand finals commenced in 1967 with the match being shown on all four Sydney channels. As a result, the crowd of 56,358 was the lowest seen at a grand final since the rainy 1962 St George and Wests decider.

South Sydney, led by new skipper John Sattler, began their period of dominance by downing Canterbury in a torrid 80 minutes played in bleak conditions with a light rain throughout. Taylforth and Eric Simms opened accounts with early goals, before John O'Neill barged over for a close-range try from dummy half. Canterbury's Ron Raper responded with a field-goal kicked from halfway and then Taylforth punished Souths with two successful penalty goals after firstly a clash between Kevin Ryan and O'Neill and then a scrum infringement. Canterbury led 8–5.

A turning point came just before half-time when Rabbitohs second rower Bob McCarthy swooped on a lofted pass from Canterbury's Col Brown intended for Johnny Greaves and ran the length of the field to take Souths into the break with a 10–8 lead.

Taylforth kicked his fourth goal to take the scores level nine minutes into the second-half but from that point on the match became a tight arm wrestle. With five minutes remaining Canterbury's Ross Kidd was penalised for an incorrect scrum feed and Simms kicked the Rabbitohs to a two-point lead which they held to give them their 17th premiership title.

It marked the beginning of a new golden period for Souths and Ron Coote, Mike Cleary, Bob McCarthy, O'Neill, Sattler and Simms would win four premierships in the next five seasons and figure prominently in representative squads of that period.

South Sydney 12 (Tries: O'Neill, McCarthy. Goals: Simms 3)

Canterbury-Bankstown 10 (Goals: Taylforth 4. Fld Goal: Raper)

== Player statistics ==
The following statistics are as of the conclusion of Round 22.

Top 5 point scorers

Points	Player	Tries	Goals	Field Goals
219	Eric Simms	3	93	12
186	George Taylforth	2	90	0
151	Dennis Preston	5	68	0
139	Terry Hughes	1	67	1
135	Bob Batty	7	56	1

Top 5 try scorers

Tries	Player
16	Les Hanigan
14	Brian James
14	Ken Irvine
12	Johnny King
11	Bob McCarthy
11	Reg Gasnier

Top 5 goal scorers

Goals	Player
93	Eric Simms
90	George Taylforth
68	Dennis Preston
67	Terry Hughes
56	Bob Batty
