= 1972 Cronulla-Sutherland Sharks season =

- NSWRFL rank: 8th
- 1972 record: Wins: 8; draws: 0; losses: 14
- Points scored: For: 332 (61 tries, 74 goals, 1 field goal); against: 378 (71 tries, 82 points, 1 field goal)

Team information
- Coach: Tommy Bishop
- Captain: Greg Pierce Ken Maddison Cliff Watson
- Stadium: Endeavour Field
- Avg. attendance: 6,162

Top scorers
- Tries: Ray Corcoran (13)
- Goals: Barry Andrews (71)
- Points: Barry Andrews (151)
← 1971	1973 →

The 1972 Cronulla-Sutherland Sharks season was the sixth in the club's history. They competed in the NSWRFL's 1972 premiership.

== Ladder ==
	Team	Pld	W	D	L	PF	PA	PD	Pts
1	Manly-Warringah	22	18	1	3	460	255	+205	37
2	Eastern Suburbs	22	17	1	4	514	297	+217	35
3	St. George	22	16	2	4	398	221	+177	34
4	South Sydney	22	14	0	8	456	331	+125	28
5	Newtown	22	11	2	9	402	371	+31	24
6	Canterbury-Bankstown	22	12	0	10	382	373	+9	24
7	Western Suburbs	22	8	1	13	367	398	-31	17
8	Cronulla-Sutherland	22	8	0	14	332	378	-46	16
9	North Sydney	22	7	1	14	320	405	-85	15
10	Balmain	22	6	1	15	333	455	-122	13
11	Penrith	22	5	1	16	278	490	-212	11
12	Parramatta	22	4	2	16	317	585	-268	10
