= Bruce Longbottom =

Australian rugby league footballer

Personal information
- Born: 7 February 1964 (age 62)

Playing information
- Position: Wing, Centre, Fullback
Club
Years	Team	Pld	T	G	FG	P
1988–90	South Sydney	49	16	0	0	64
- Source: As of 21 October 2019
- Relatives: Kevin Longbottom (uncle)

Bruce Longbottom (born 7 February 1964) is a former professional rugby league footballer who played three seasons for South Sydney.

== Playing career ==
Longbottom made his first grade debut for South Sydney in round 2 of the 1988 season against arch rivals Eastern Suburbs at the Sydney Football Stadium.

Longbottom was a member of the South Sydney team that won the minor premiership in the 1989 NSWRL season but failed to reach the grand final after being defeated by the Canberra Raiders in the preliminary final.

Longbottom's final season for Souths came in 1990, as the club went from minor premiers the previous year to wooden spooners after winning only 2 games all year.
