= Sutherland Oval =

Sports venue in Sutherland, New South Wales

- Interactive map of Sutherland Oval
- Location: The Grand Parade, Sutherland, New South Wales
- Coordinates: 34°01′43″S 151°03′06″E
- Surface: Grass

Tenants
- Cronulla Sutherland Sharks (NSWRL) (1967–1968); Southern Sharks (Jim Beam Cup) (2008); Sutherland Loftus United (CSDRFL) (1912–); Sutherland Sharks FC (NSWPL) (late 1950s–1958)

Sutherland Oval is a sporting ground, situated in Sutherland, New South Wales. It has been used for professional Rugby League matches, as well as for lower tiered Soccer and Rugby Union matches over the years.

== Ground Usage ==
In the late 1950s, the Sutherland Sharks FC football (soccer) club played at the ground, before moving to Seymour Shaw Park, in the NSW Premier League competition.

In the NSWRL competition, the Cronulla Sutherland Sharks club used this ground as their home ground. The club entered the national competition in 1967, and held their first two seasons at this venue (in 1967 and 1968), before moving to Endeavour Field, where they have stayed ever since the move in 1969.

In 2008, the Southern Sharks played at this ground, playing in the Jim Beam Cup, a lower tiered rugby league competition.

The ground is also home to the Sutherland-Loftus United Pirates currently play here, in the Illawarra Rugby League competition. The club's junior teams are also based at the ground, and compete in the Cronulla-Sutherland District Rugby Football League.

== See also ==
- Rugby league in New South Wales
