= Dave Cotter =

Australian rugby league footballer

Personal information
- Full name: David Cotter
- Died: 30 December 2002

Playing information
- Position: Wing
Club
Years	Team	Pld	T	G	FG	P
1967–70	Newtown	68	24	8	0	88
1971–72	Cronulla-Sutherland	34	11	30	0	93
1973	Canterbury-Bankstown	2	0	0	0	0
1975	Parramatta	10	2	34	0	74
	Total	114	37	72	0	255

Dave Cotter (died 30 December 2002) was an Australian former professional rugby league footballer who played in the 1960s and 1970s. He played for Newtown, Cronulla-Sutherland, Canterbury-Bankstown and Parramatta in the NSWRL competition.

== Playing career ==
Cotter made his first grade debut for Newtown in round 8 of the 1967 NSWRFL season against Canterbury at the Sydney Sports Ground. In the 1968 and 1969 seasons, Cotter was Newtown's top tryscorer. After four years at Newtown, Cotter joined Cronulla where he spent the next two seasons. In 1973, he joined Canterbury but only played two matches for the club in first grade. Cotter would play for Wollongong Wolves RLFC in 1974 and represent Illawarra firsts. In 1975, Cotter joined Parramatta and played one season with the club.
