= Ron "Jake" Moses =

Australian rugby league footballer

Ron Moses
Personal information
- Full name: Ronald Moses
- Born: Newcastle, New South Wales, Australia

Playing information
- Position: Second-row
Club
Years	Team	Pld	T	G	FG	P
1956–59	Balmain	23	2	0	0	6
- Source: As of 29 March 2019
- Relatives: Bob Moses (brother)

Ron Moses also known as "Jake Moses" was an Australian professional rugby league footballer who played in 1950s. He played for Balmain in the NSWRL competition.

== Background ==
Moses was born in Newcastle, New South Wales. He played his junior rugby league for Lakes United. He was the older brother of premiership winning player Bob Moses who played for South Sydney and Manly-Warringah. Moses played in the riverina before being selected by Balmain.

== Playing career ==
Moses made his first grade debut for Balmain in 1956. Moses became a regular starter for the team as they reached the grand final defeating South Sydney along the way.

Moses played at second-row in the 1956 grand final against St George. Balmain lost the match 18–12 in front of 60,000 fans at the Sydney Cricket Ground. The grand final win for St George was their first of 11 successive premiership victories.

Moses played with Balmain until the end of 1959 and then retired.
