= Bob Moses (rugby league) =

Australian rugby league footballer

Personal information
- Full name: Robert Lindsay Moses
- Born: 26 July 1940 Newcastle, New South Wales, Australia
- Died: 21 December 2017 (aged 77) Penrith, New South Wales, Australia

Playing information
- Position: Centre, Second-row, Lock
Club
Years	Team	Pld	T	G	FG	P
1965–70	South Sydney	94	12	0	0	36
1971–73	Manly-Warringah	13	5	0	0	15
	Total	107	17	0	0	51
- Relatives: Ron Moses (brother)

Robert Lindsay Moses (26 July 1940 – 21 December 2017) was an Australian rugby league footballer who played in the 1960s and 1970s. He was a dual premiership winning player at the South Sydney Rabbitohs.

== Playing career ==
Moses originated from Newcastle, New South Wales, and signed with South Sydney in 1965. He played in the 1965 Grand Final for Souths, but they were defeated by St. George 12–8. He went on to play six seasons with South Sydney between 1965 and 1970. He played in three more grand finals for Souths, winning the 1967 Grand Final and 1968 Grand Final and played in the 1969 Grand Final loss to Balmain.

By 1970, he was in reserve grade and his Souths career was over. He moved to Manly-Warringah for three seasons between 1971 and 1973 but injury curtailed his career at Manly. He did not feature in any other Grand Finals before retiring.

== Later life ==
He later became a successful publican in the Penrith area. Moses death was announced on 21 December 2017.
