= Gordon Abercrombie =

Australian rugby league footballer

Personal information
- Full name: Gordon Abercrombie
- Born: Sydney, New South Wales, Australia

Playing information
- Position: Fullback
Club
Years	Team	Pld	T	G	FG	P
1967–69	Cronulla-Sutherland	52	5	21	9	75

Gordon Abercrombie is an Australian former rugby league footballer who played in the 1960s. He played for the Cronulla-Sutherland of the New South Wales Rugby League premiership competition. His usual position was at fullback.

== Playing career ==
Born in Sydney, New South Wales, Abercrombie originally signed to the Cronulla-Sutherland club in the mid-sixties as a quick and agile wing. Making his debut in the 1967 season it took him a year to cement himself as a regular first grader playing at fullback as opposed to being on the wings.
