= Stan Gorton =

Australian rugby league footballer

Personal information
- Full name: Stanley Thomas Gorton
- Born: 1946; Cairns, Queensland
- Died: 6 June 2013 (aged 66–67); Toowoomba, Queensland

Playing information
- Position: Wing
Club
Years	Team	Pld	T	G	FG	P
1966–71	St George Dragons	56	37	0	0	111
- Source: Whiticker/Hudson

Stan Gorton (1946–2013) was an Australian rugby league footballer who played in the 1960s.

Originally from Cairns, Queensland, Stan Gorton came to the St George Dragons for six seasons between 1966 and 1971. Known as a terrific try scoring winger, Stan Gorton was the season's leading try scorer in the 1968 NSWRFL season. He retired in 1972 due to injuries that plagued his later career.

Stanley Thomas Gorton died on 6 June 2013 at Toowoomba, Queensland aged 67.
