= Jack Danzey =

Australian rugby league footballer (1939–2020)

Personal information
- Full name: John Joseph Danzey Jr.
- Born: 9 July 1939 Darlinghurst, New South Wales, Australia
- Died: 31 August 2020 (aged 81)

Playing information
- Position: Five-eighth
Club
Years	Team	Pld	T	G	FG	P
1960	Newtown	7	1	1	0	5
1961	Narrandera
1962–65	Balmain	50	4	17	0	46
1967–68	Cronulla-Sutherland	25	3	0	2	13
	Total	82	8	18	2	64

Refereeing information
Years	Competition	Apps
1973–83	New South Wales Rugby League	172
- Source: rleague.com

John Joseph Danzey Jr. (9 July 1939 – 31 August 2020) was an Australian professional rugby league footballer, referee and administrator. He played in the NSWRFL Premiership for the Newtown, Balmain and Cronulla-Sutherland clubs during the 1960s, and went on to control 172 first-grade games as a referee.

== Player ==
Danzey commenced his first grade football career with Newtown in 1960, playing seven games. The next year he played for Narrandera, who paid a transfer fee of £400 ($800) to Newtown for Danzey. In 1962 he joined the Balmain Tigers, who paid the same transfer fee to Narrandera.

In 1964 Danzey played in the first grade grand final, going down 11–6 to St. George. He went on to captain the Balmain reserve grade team to win the 1965 competition.

Danzey completed the last two years of his playing career with Cronulla-Sutherland in 1967–68, where he played some of his best football.

== Referee ==
Danzey began his refereeing career in the Newtown District Junior Rugby League. He was subsequently graded to referee in the New South Wales Rugby League (NSWRL), gaining his first first-grade match in 1973. He went on to control over 170 top grade matches in a career that lasted until 1983.

Danzey was ranked as the top referee for extended periods, refereeing numerous televised matches-of-the-round, the City vs Country match in 1978 and 1982, New South Wales vs Queensland (1978, 1980) and semi-finals (1977, 1978, 1980, 1982). However, he was never appointed to an end-of-season grand final, a situation he put down to the appointments system. Danzey officiated as a replacement touch judge in the 1977 grand final replay. The original touch judge was felled by a projectile thrown from the crowd. Danzey, who had controlled the earlier reserve grade grand final and was the standby referee, finished the first grade game as a touch judge.

Danzey's refereeing career came to an abrupt halt on 4 April 1983 when he suffered a heart attack after refereeing a match between St. George and Canterbury-Bankstown. He subsequently went on to become Referees' Co-ordinator for the NSWRL.

== Personal life ==
Danzey was married to Kay; they had six children. Their daughter Lynn-Maree is a film and television director.

Away from rugby league, Danzey was a physical education and careers teacher at Dulwich High School, Birrong Boys High School, Burwood Girls High School and Kingsgrove North High School.

Danzey's father, also known as Jack, played for Newtown Jets and Balmain Tigers in the 1940s.
