= Barry Bryant (rugby league) =

Australian rugby league footballer

Personal information
- Full name: Barry Bryant
- Born: 23 May 1945 (age 80)

Playing information
- Position: Second-row, Lock
Club
Years	Team	Pld	T	G	FG	P
1965–73	Western Suburbs	136	25	0	0	75
- Source: As of 8 July 2019

Barry Bryant is an Australian former rugby league footballer who played in the 1960s and 1970s. He played for Western Suburbs in the New South Wales Rugby League (NSWRL) competition.

== Playing career ==
Bryant was recruited from the Cowra Magpies in the Country New South Wales competition by Western Suburbs in 1965. Bryant spent 8 seasons with Western Suburbs although his time at the club was not very successful with the side failing to reach the finals and they finished last on the table in 1971. Bryant was described by former Wests player Noel Kelly as the best and toughest rugby league footballer he ever played with.

After 186 games across all grades, Bryant left Western Suburbs and signed on as captain-coach of the Gloucester Magpies. Bryant then returned to Sydney and played with Wentworthville in the metropolitan competition. Bryant then returned to Cowra and became coach of the Cowra Magpies reserve grade side in the 1980s. Bryant had a unique career in which every club he played for had the nickname "Magpies".

== Accolades ==
Bryant was named in the Western Suburbs team of the 1960s team. In 2016, Bryant was inducted into Cowra's Sporting Hall Of Fame.
