= John Hynes (rugby league) =

Australian rugby league footballer

Personal information
- Full name: John Hynes

Playing information
- Position: Hooker
Club
Years	Team	Pld	T	G	FG	P
1963–65	South Sydney	9	0	0	0	0
1967–68	Cronulla-Sutherland	43	1	0	0	3
	Total	52	1	0	0	3

John Hynes nicknamed "Bomber" is an Australian former rugby league footballer who played as a hooker for South Sydney and Cronulla-Sutherland in the 1960s. He was an inaugural player for Cronulla and played in the club's first ever game.

== Playing career ==
Hynes was a Souths junior and signed with the club in 1957. Hynes made his first grade debut for South Sydney in 1963 against Canterbury-Bankstown. Hynes spent 6 years at the club but mainly played for the reserve grade team. In total, Hynes made 73 appearances for Souths in all grades. In 1967, Hynes signed for newly admitted club Cronulla-Sutherland and played for the club in its first ever game against Eastern Suburbs which Cronulla won 11–5. Cronulla only managed to win 2 further games that year and finished with the wooden spoon after coming last. The following season, Cronulla fared better in the league and won a total of 6 games finishing 3rd last. Hynes retired at the end of 1968 making a total of 43 appearances for the club.
