= Brian Cox (rugby league) =

Australian rugby league footballer

Personal information
- Full name: Brian Cox
- Born: Parramatta, New South Wales, Australia

Playing information
- Position: Fullback
Club
Years	Team	Pld	T	G	FG	P
1960–64	Parramatta	46	9	0	0	27
1967–70	Cronulla-Sutherland	41	7	7	0	35
	Total	87	16	7	0	62

Brian Cox is an Australian rugby league footballer who played as a fullback who played for Parramatta and Cronulla-Sutherland who played in the 1960s and 1970s. He was an inaugural player for Cronulla and played in the club's first ever game.

== Playing career ==
Cox began his first grade career with Parramatta in 1960. In his two seasons at the club, Parramatta finished last on the table claiming the wooden spoon. In 1962, under the guidance of new coach Ken Kearney, Parramatta went from easy beats to a competitive side and qualified for their first final series in 1962. Cox missed out on the 1963 season but returned in 1964 as Parramatta finished 2nd on the table. Cox played in both finals games as the club were defeated by Balmain in the preliminary final.

In 1967, Cox joined Cronulla who had just been admitted into the NSWRL competition along with Penrith. Cox played in Cronulla's first ever game which was an 11–5 victory over Eastern Suburbs at the Sydney Sports Ground. Cronulla only managed to win 2 games for the whole season after that point and finished last on the table. Cox went on to play with Cronulla for another 3 seasons in which the club struggled near the foot of the table and finished last again in 1969.
