= 1968 Eastern Suburbs season =

← 1967	1969 →

Eastern Suburbs (now known as the Sydney Roosters) competed in their 61st season of the New South Wales Rugby League premiership in 1968.

== Ladder ==
	Team	Pld	W	D	L	PF	PA	PD	Pts
1	South Sydney	22	16	0	6	394	271	+123	32
2	Manly-Warringah	22	15	1	6	379	282	+97	31
3	St. George	22	13	3	6	416	320	+96	29
4	Eastern Suburbs	22	14	1	7	362	274	+88	29
5	Balmain	22	14	0	8	393	284	+109	28
6	Parramatta	22	12	1	9	308	284	+24	25
7	Western Suburbs	22	12	0	10	328	279	+49	24
8	Penrith	22	11	0	11	298	352	-54	22
9	Canterbury-Bankstown	22	9	1	12	259	301	-42	19
10	Cronulla-Sutherland	22	6	0	16	259	405	-146	12
11	North Sydney	22	4	0	18	259	388	-129	8
12	Newtown	22	2	1	19	257	472	-215	5
