= Bob Lanigan =

Australian rugby league footballer and coach (1942–2024)

Personal information
- Full name: Robert Lanigan
- Born: 1 October 1942
- Died: 3 April 2024 (aged 81)

Playing information
- Position: Wing
Club
Years	Team	Pld	T	G	FG	P
1965–68	Newtown	67	11	204	7	455

Robert Lanigan (1 October 1942 – 3 April 2024) was an Australian rugby league footballer who played in the 1960s. He played for Newtown in the New South Wales Rugby League (NSWRL) competition.

== Playing career ==
Lanigan made his first grade debut for Newtown in 1965. The club would go on to finish 6th on the table and Lanigan finished as the club's top point scorer with 63 points.

In 1966, Newtown finished 4th on the table and reached the finals for the first time since 1962. Newtown were beaten by the Manly Sea Eagles in the semi-final 10–9 at the Sydney Cricket Ground. Lanigan finished as the competition's top point scorer with 185 points.

In Lanigan's last two seasons at Newtown, the club finished 9th in 1967 and last in 1968. Lanigan finished both seasons as the club's top point scorer and 5th highest point scorer in the club's history. In 1969, Lanigan departed Newtown and became captain-coach of the Griffith Waratahs. He then played for the Dapto Canaries from 1971–72, Erina Hawks from 1973–74 and Macquarie Scorpions in 1975.

== Coaching career ==
Lanigan coached the Erina Hawks from 1976 to 1979 and then worked as a strength and conditioning coach under John Monie, working at the Parramatta Eels in the 1980s, the Wigan Warriors in the 1990s, the Auckland Warriors between 1995 and 1999, and the New Zealand Kiwis.

== Match official ==
Lanigan later worked as a ground manager for the National Rugby League and he was in charge of over 650 games including grand finals, State of Origin games and Test matches.

== Death ==
Lanigan died on 3 April 2024, at the age of 81.
