= Brian James (rugby league) =

Australian rugby league footballer (1943–2020)

Personal information
- Born: 9 April 1943; Sydney, New South Wales, Australia
- Died: 10 January 2020 (aged 76)

Playing information
- Height: 180 cm (5 ft 11 in)
- Position: Centre, Wing
Club
Years	Team	Pld	T	G	FG	P
1962–65	St. George	16	5	0	0	15
1966–69	South Sydney	79	32	0	0	96
	Total	95	37	0	0	111
Representative
Years	Team	Pld	T	G	FG	P
1968	New South Wales	2	0	0	0	0
1968	Australia	1	0	0	0	0

Brian Knight James (9 April 1943 – 10 January 2020) was an Australian professional rugby league footballer who played in the 1960s. A national and state representative, he played in the 1968 Rugby League World Cup-winning team for Australia as a winger. His club career was played at centre for the St. George Dragons and on the wing for the South Sydney Rabbitohs.

== Early life ==
The son of Country representative forward Jack James, Brian's rugby league career began in primary school. While attending Newington College (1955–1960) he took up rugby union and, after leaving school, played first grade for the St George Rugby Union Club.

== Rugby League – club career ==
At the end of Brian's first year at university he transferred to the St. George rugby league club (1962–1965). While at St. George he won three reserve-grade premierships and was kept out of the top grade by Reg Gasnier, Johnny Riley and Billy Smith who started with the club in the centres.

He won three Second Grade Premierships (1962–1964) and also a First Grade Premiership blazer in 1965. In 1962, in a Second Grade Grand Final (St George vs Wests), he scored from the kick off after St. George kicked to the backs, the ball bounced once and then he scored under the posts. It is argued that this has been the fastest try in league as it was scored 10 seconds after the kick off.

He then transferred to South Sydney in 1966 for four seasons where he played in three first grade Grand finals. He played four seasons as a winger for the South Sydney club from 1966 to 1969. He played in the Premiership winning sides of 1967 and 1968. He played in the 1969 loss to Balmain and crossed for Souths but was controversially ruled to have touched the corner post in the process.

James then retired at the start of the 1970, at the age of 26 to pursue a career in transport and logistics.

== Rugby League – representative career ==
Earning the recognition at Souths which he had been denied in the star-studded Saints lineups, James was selected for New South Wales in 1968 and made two appearances against Queensland. In 1968 he was called upon for Australia's Rugby League World Cup squad and appeared in Australia's 37-4 tournament win over France at Lang Park.

== Professional Sprinting ==
From 1962 – 1969 during the off-season Brian traveled throughout Australia to attend professional sprinting gifts in locations such as Devonport, Macksville, North Sydney and Coonabarabran.

== The First Touch Football Competition ==
On 9 February 1968, Brian and Jack Thom (who was a well known Sydney Solicitor and Patron of South Sydney), organised the first official touch football tournament at Redfern Oval.

All but two Sydney First Grade teams took part in the event (Western Suburbs and Canterbury). The event was billed as the "South Sydney Charity Night" with proceeds going to the Spastic Centre.

James and Thom along with the NSWRL Referees Association recorded the rules in the event program, that being 7 players per side plus two reserves, each half duration being seven minutes, the field is 70 yards by 40 yards and a player is "tackled" when he is touched with two hands by an opposition player.

== Bibliography ==
- Whiticker, Alan & Hudson, Glen (2007). The Encyclopedia of Rugby League Players. Wetherill Park, New South Wales: Gary Allen Pty Ltd. ISBN 978-1-877082-93-1.
