= Les Hanigan =

Australia international rugby league footballer

Personal information
- Born: 19 November 1945 (age 80) Wollongong, New South Wales, Australia

Playing information
- Height: 175 cm (5 ft 9 in)
- Weight: 11 st 0 lb (70 kg)
- Position: Centre
Club
Years	Team	Pld	T	G	FG	P
	Collegians (IRL)
1967–72	Manly Sea Eagles	78	44	0	0	132
197?–??	Proserpine
	Total	78	44	0	0	132
Representative
Years	Team	Pld	T	G	FG	P
1966	Southern NSW
1966	Country NSW	1	1	0	0	3
1967	New South Wales	3	2	0	0	6
1967	Australia	2	3	0	0	9
197?	North Queensland

Les Hanigan (born 19 November 1945) is an Australian former professional rugby league footballer who played in the 1960s and 1970s. An Australian international and New South Wales representative wing, he played club football in Illawarra for Collegians, in Sydney for Manly-Warringah and in North Queensland for Proserpine.

A pro runner from Wollongong, Hanigan was selected to represent Southern New South Wales against the touring Great Britain team in 1966, scoring a try. He signed on to play in Sydney's NSWRFL competition with the Manly-Warringah club in 1967. That year, he set a new club record for most tries. He scored five tries in a match against competition newcomers, Cronulla-Sutherland. After playing for New South Wales, he scored two tries in Australia's First Test win over New Zealand. By the end of the 1967 NSWRFL season he had scored sixteen tries, the most in the competition, before being selected to represent Australia on the 1967–68 Kangaroo tour of Great Britain and France. Hanigan played in 11 games on tour but no Tests. With Manly-Warringah he reached the 1968 NSWRFL season's grand final and played on the wing in the loss to Souths.

After his time with Manly, Hanigan moved north to captain-coach Queensland's Proserpine club. From here he was selected to represent North Queensland.
