= Graeme Sams =

Australian rugby league footballer

Personal information
- Full name: Graeme Donald Sams
- Born: 13 November 1946
- Died: 31 January 1999 (aged 52) Sutherland, New South Wales

Playing information
- Position: Centre, Second-row, Lock
Club
Years	Team	Pld	T	G	FG	P
1967–70	Cronulla Sharks	70	7	0	0	21
1971–74	St. George Dragons	69	10	0	0	30
1975–77	Cronulla Sharks	11	0	0	0	0
	Total	150	17	0	0	51
- Source: Whiticker/Hudson

Graeme Donald Sames (1946-1999) was an Australian rugby league footballer who played in the 1960s and 1970s.

== Career ==
A Sutherland Junior, Graeme Sams was graded with the Cronulla-Sutherland Sharks in the club's foundation year in 1967. He started as a tenacious centre who went on to become a whole hearted lock forward for the Sharks. After four seasons, he was enticed to join St. George Dragons by Frank Facer and club coach Jack Gibson in 1971. Sams stayed with the Dragons for four seasons until a chronic knee injury stifled his career. He re-joined the Sharks in 1975 and battled away with injuries until his last year in 1977 when he featured in 11 first grade games. He announced his retirement at the end of the 1977 season, aged 31.

Graeme 'Sambo' Sams was diagnosed with cancer in the late 1990s.

== Death ==
Graeme Sams died on 31 January 1999, age 52
