= Hal Browne =

Australian rugby league footballer

Personal information
- Full name: Harold Browne
- Born: Sydney, New South Wales, Australia

Playing information
- Position: Centre
Club
Years	Team	Pld	T	G	FG	P
1964–70	Balmain	73	25	3	0	81
- Source: As of 17 May 2019

Hal Browne is an Australian former rugby league footballer who played in the 1960s and 1970s. He played for Balmain in the New South Wales Rugby League (NSWRL) competition.

== Playing career ==
Browne made his first grade debut for Balmain in 1964. Browne did not feature in any of Balmain's finals games that year and subsequent grand final appearance against St George.

In 1966, Balmain would again reach the grand final against the all conquering St George side. Browne was not selected to play in the decider as St George defeated Balmain claiming their 11th straight premiership.

In 1969, Balmain finished second on the table and reached the grand final after defeating Manly-Warringah in the preliminary final. Balmain's opponents in the grand final were South Sydney who went into the game as favourites over Balmain.

Browne missed the game through injury as Balmain won their 11th and final premiership 11-2 in a shock win. The grand final is best remembered for Balmain's tactics as Souths had accused them of laying down and feigning injury. In 2017, Browne spoke about the final saying "At training on the Tuesday night, Nosa said, ‘This is what we’re going to do — every time they get a roll-on, one of you go down hurt. I don’t care who it is, just go down hurt on the ground. We’ve got to play them at our pace, not at their pace.’ So we did it and it worked".

The following season in 1970, Balmain were unable to defend their premiership and finished a disappointing 6th place on the table. Browne retired following the conclusion of the 1970 season.
