= Alec Tennant =

Australian rugby league footballer

Personal information
- Full name: Alec Tennant

Playing information
- Position: Centre
Club
Years	Team	Pld	T	G	FG	P
1964–70	Manly-Warringah	75	31	0	0	93
1972	Parramatta	4	0	0	0	0
	Total	79	31	0	0	93
Representative
Years	Team	Pld	T	G	FG	P
1966	New South Wales	2	0	0	0	0
1967	NSW City	1	0	0	0	0

Alec Tennant is an Australian former professional rugby league footballer who played in the 1960s and 1970s. He played for Manly and Parramatta in the NSWRL premiership. He played at centre.

== Playing career ==
A Harbord United and Narraweena junior, Tennant made his debut for Manly in 1964. In 1966, Tennant was selected to play for New South Wales and in 1967 was selected to play for the New South Wales City team. In 1968, Tennant was a member of the Manly side which reached the grand final against South Sydney. Manly narrowly lost the match 13–9. In 1970, Tennant played in his second grand final against South Sydney once again. Souths won the match convincingly 23–12. Tennant left Manly at the end of 1970 and in 1972 joined Parramatta. Tennant featured in 4 games for Parramatta in his only season at the club as they finished last on the table. Tennant retired at the end of 1972.
