= David Knox (rugby league) =

Australian rugby league footballer

Personal information
- Full name: David Knox

Playing information
- Position: Second-row
Club
Years	Team	Pld	T	G	FG	P
1964–71	Manly-Warringah	60	0	3	0	6
- Source: As of 4 April 2019

David Knox is an Australian former professional rugby league footballer who played in the 1960s and 1970s. He played for Manly-Warringah in the New South Wales Rugby League (NSWRL) competition.

== Playing career ==
Knox made his first grade debut for Manly in 1964. In 1968, Knox played in the 1968 NSWRL grand final against South Sydney. Manly were appearing in their 4th grand final but were still in search of their first premiership. Manly had beaten Souths a fortnight earlier to reach the grand final but in the decider Souths defeated Manly 13–9. Knox retired at the end of the 1971 season.
