= Kevin Longbottom =

Australian rugby league player (1940–1986)

Personal information
- Full name: Kevin James Longbottom
- Born: 23 December 1940 Sydney, New South Wales, Australia
- Died: 13 January 1986 (aged 45) La Perouse, New South Wales, Australia

Playing information
- Height: 185 cm (6 ft 1 in)
- Weight: 99 kg (15 st 8 lb)
- Position: Fullback
Club
Years	Team	Pld	T	G	FG	P
1961–69	South Sydney	105	27	134	0	349
- Relatives: Bruce Longbottom (nephew)

Kevin Longbottom (23 December 1940 – 13 January 1986) was an Aboriginal Australian professional rugby league footballer who played in the 1960s. Longbottom was known by the nickname "Lummy" and was renowned for his long-range goal kicking, sometimes even kicking goals from further than the halfway line. A large, barrel-chested man, he won a premiership with the South Sydney Rabbitohs in 1967, and played on the 1965 team that were runners up. He played Fullback for most of his career.

Longbottom initially forced his way into first grade when full-back Darrel Chapman became injured. He kicked a conversion in South Sydney's win over Canterbury in the 1967 Grand final that should have resulted in a 14–10 win. His three long range penalty goals in the 1965 Grand Final are still regarded as possibly the longest kicks ever attempted at the Sydney Cricket Ground.

In addition to his rugby career, Longbottom is also remembered as a caddie to many professional golfers including Bruce Devlin, Bob Shearer and American Tommy Bolt.

Longbottom died from cancer in 1986 at the age of 45.
