= Dennis Preston =

Australian rugby league footballer

Playing information
- Position: Fullback, Wing
Club
Years	Team	Pld	T	G	FG	P
1966–71	St. George	74	21	201	0	465
1972	Balmain	10	1	33	0	69
	Total	84	22	234	0	534

Dennis Preston is an Australian former rugby league footballer.

Preston played first–grade for St. George between 1966 and 1971. He debuted during their 1966 season, as the club gained an 11th successive premiership, but didn't feature in the finals campaign. Over the next two seasons, Preston was a regular in sides which made back to back preliminary finals, playing as a fullback and occasional winger. His abilities at fullback allowed selectors to play Graeme Langlands as a centre and he was favoured over Langlands as their goal–kicker both seasons. Opportunities thereafter were limited. He finished his career with a season playing for Balmain in 1972, then left for Port Kembla.
