= George Taylforth =

English rugby league footballer

Personal information
- Full name: George Henry Taylforth
- Born: 25 January 1941 (age 85) Liverpool, England

Playing information
Club
| Years | Team | Pld | T | G | FG | P |
|---|---|---|---|---|---|---|
| 1965–69 | Canterbury-Bankstown | 86 | 8 | 192 | 1 | 410 |
| 1970–72 | Cronulla-Sutherland | 35 | 5 | 122 | 0 | 259 |
| | Total | 121 | 13 | 314 | 1 | 669 |
Representative
| Years | Team | Pld | T | G | FG | P |
| 1967 | New South Wales | 1 | 0 | 0 | 0 | 0 |
- Source: NRL Stats

George Henry Taylforth (born 25 January 1941) is a British-born Australian former professional rugby league footballer who played in the 1960s and 1970s. He played for Canterbury-Bankstown and Cronulla-Sutherland, notable for his long-range goal-kicking. He attended Sydney Boys High School playing alongside 1991 World Cup Winning Australia rugby union coach Bob Dwyer and premiership winning St. George Dragons rugby-league halfback George Evans (1962, 1963, 1964, 1965). He was also coached by former NSW rugby league representative Frank O'Rourke (rugby league) at school.

== Playing career ==
Taylforth was graded to St. George in 1961 and played in three consecutive winning reserve-grade grand finals from 1962 to 1964 but he was unable to break into the first-grade side. In 1965, Taylforth moved to Canterbury and he was team captain in 1966.

St. George's run of eleven straight premierships came to an end in 1967 when Canterbury defeated them by 12–11 in the preliminary final. Taylforth contributed three goals to the Canterbury score. In the 1967 Grand Final, Canterbury lost to South Sydney 12–10, with Taylforth scoring eight of the ten points from four goals. In the 1967 season, Taylforth scored 204 points and became the first Canterbury player to score more than 200 points in one season.

Taylforth signed with Cronulla-Sutherland in 1970 and spent three seasons with the club. In his first season with the club, Taylforth once again scored more than 200 points – 202 – a record that stood for thirty years until Mat Rogers scored 212 points in the 2000 season.

== Police career ==
Joining the New South Wales Police Force in 1960, Taylforth (as Detective Chief Inspector) went on to command the Gaming Squad in 1987. Taylforth was a witness at the ICAC's investigation into the Relationship Between Police and Criminals between 1992 and 1994. The Gaming Squad was disbanded in 1993 as a result of the commission's findings.
