= Jim Matthews (rugby league) =

Australian rugby league footballer

Personal information
- Full name: Jim Matthews
- Born: 25 January 1938 (age 88) Leeton, New South Wales, Australia

Playing information
- Position: Five-eighth
Club
Years	Team	Pld	T	G	FG	P
1962–63	Canterbury	15	2	3	0	12
1964–68	Eastern Suburbs	73	9	49	4	133
	Total	88	11	52	4	145
- As of 1 Jan 2022

Jim Matthews (Leighton, NSW) was a rugby league footballer who played for the Canterbury Bulldogs, Eastern Suburbs clubs in the New South Wales Rugby League (NSWRL) competition.

Matthews, a five-eighth, played 17 matches for the Canterbury Bankstown side in the years (1962–63) before joining Eastern Suburbs the following season at a time when Easts were experiencing the bleakest period in the club's history, they won just 2 matches in '64, 3 in '65 and were winless in '66. Under new coach, Jack Gibson, Matthews was appointed captain and in a dramatic turn around led Easts to consecutive semi finals. At the end of the 1968 season he left Easts and returned to rural NSW where he played out the remainder of his career in the Illawarra competition.

Said to be a tough and rugged player, the five-eighth is recognised as Eastern Suburbs 543rd player. Matthews played 73 matches for the Sydney Roosters and scored 133 points, coming from 9 tries, 49 goals and 4 field goals.
