= Endeavour Field =

Rugby league stadium in Woolooware, New South Wales, Australia

- Shark Park
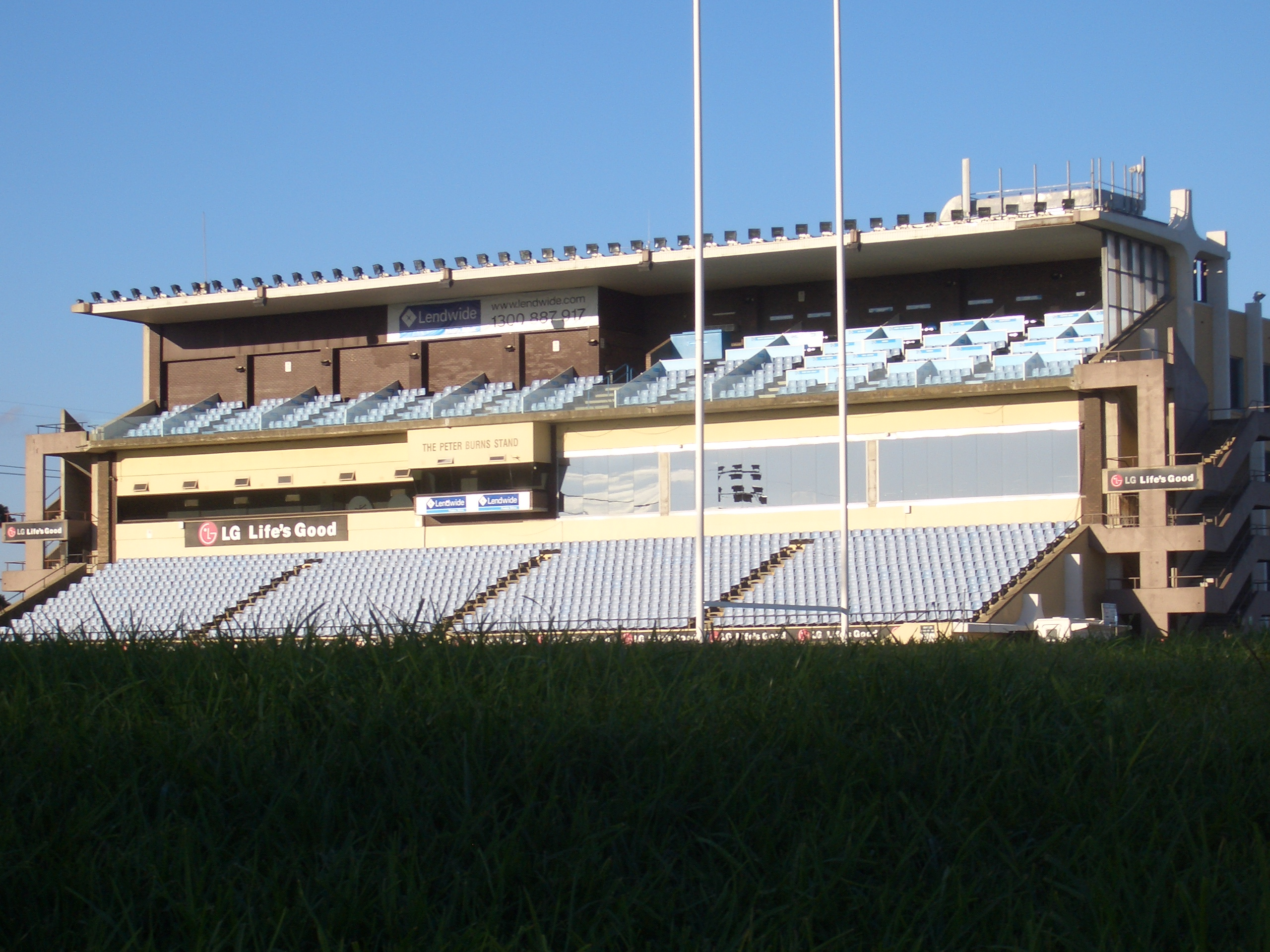
- Interactive map of Endeavour Field
- Former names: Pointsbet Stadium; Southern Cross Group Stadium; Remondis Stadium; Toyota Park; Ronson Field; Caltex Field; Shark Park; Sharks Stadium
- Location: Woolooware, New South Wales, Australia
- Coordinates: 34°2′19″S 151°8′27″E
- Owner: Cronulla-Sutherland Rugby League Club
- Operator: Cronulla-Sutherland Rugby League Football Club
- Capacity: 15,000 (reduced due to ongoing construction); 22,000 (1968–2019)
- Surface: Grass
- Record attendance: 22,302 – Sharks vs St George Illawarra, 2004
- Public transit: Woolooware railway station

Construction
- Opened: 1960

Tenants
- Cronulla-Sutherland Sharks (NRL) (1968–2019, 2022–present); Olympic Sharks (NSL) (2001–2003)

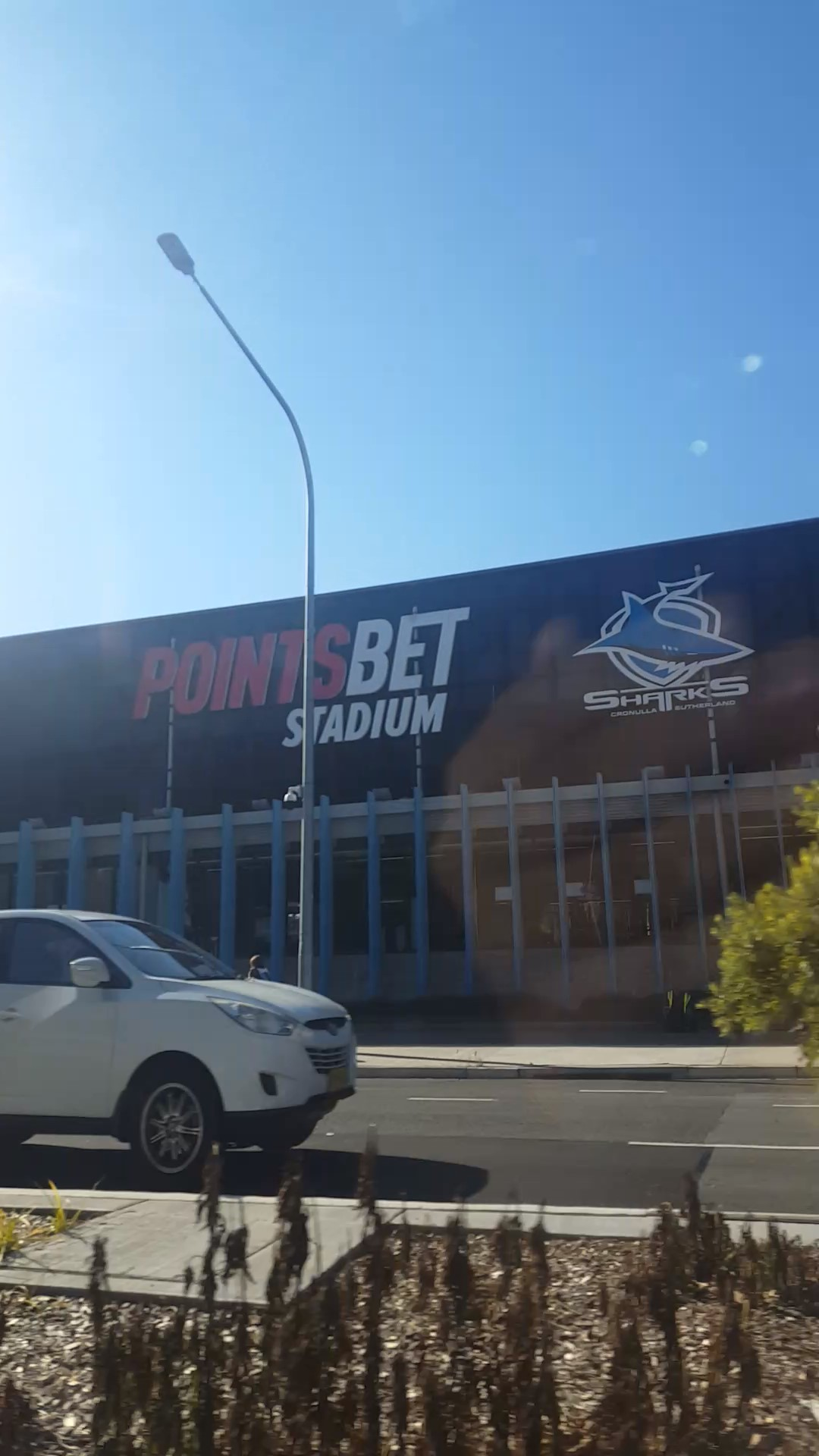
Endeavour Field from the front.

Endeavour Field (known under naming rights as Ocean Protect Stadium and commonly known as Shark Park) is a stadium located in Woolooware, a suburb in the Sutherland Shire of Southern Sydney. It is primarily used for rugby league as the home ground of the Cronulla-Sutherland Sharks in the National Rugby League (NRL).

The stadium opened in 1960, and was purpose built for rugby league. The Cronulla-Sutherland Sharks have called the ground home since their admission into the New South Wales Rugby Football League (NSWRFL) in 1967. The Sharks are as of 2023 just one of two professional sporting clubs in Australia that own and operate their home ground. The stadium now hosts a currently reduced capacity of 15,000 spectators, due to renovations of the ground. Waterway treatment company Ocean Protect holds naming rights of the stadium.

== History ==
The stadium was built in 1966 and currently has a capacity of 20,000. The first match to be played at the ground came on the 30 June 1968 where Cronulla-Sutherland defeated Parramatta 10-7.

In 1991 the original western grandstand was demolished and the new Endeavour Stand was built in its place for the 1992 season.

The Cronulla-Sutherland Rugby League Club owns the stadium as well as the adjacent Leagues Club, one of only two NRL clubs to own its own stadium. State government authorities and local councils generally own sporting venues in Australia.

On 21 April 2006 the Federal Government announced a A$9.6 million grant to the Cronulla-Sutherland Sharks to upgrade the stadium. The upgrade included a new covered stand to seat over 1,500 spectators at the southern end. The new stand was completed in time for the 2008 season.

Renovations were also planned for the ET Stand (originally the Endeavour Stand), named for Cronulla club legend Andrew Ettingshausen, and the Peter Burns Stand.

As of June 2020 the Leagues Club was undergoing redevelopment, with the Leagues Club closing its operations on 15 December 2019, with the facility originally due to reopen in early 2022. Due to the COVID-19 pandemic impacting construction timelines at the Leagues Club site, the completion date has been delayed to early 2023, but Cronulla returned to playing home games at the stadium in 2022 with a temporary capacity of 12,000 in place until mid-2023. Further delays in construction saw completion dates repeatedly pushed back before the rebuilt Leagues Club re-opened on 7 November, 2026 including a 2,000 capacity hospitality deck for use on match days and non match days.

== Ground usage ==
=== Rugby league ===
In the NRL competition, the Cronulla-Sutherland Sharks team has been playing at this venue since midway through the 1968 NSWRFL season, which was the club's second season into the competition (they had previously played at Sutherland Oval from 1967 until 1968).

High turnout in crowd numbers are usual when Cronulla play local-derby rivals, the St. George Illawarra Dragons. The ground attendance record is 22,302, which was set when Cronulla took on St. George in May 2004. The biggest victory Cronulla has recorded at the ground came on the 21 August 2005 against rivals Manly where Cronulla won 68-6.

In late 2017, the ground hosted the 2017 Women's Rugby League World Cup tournament. It played host to the group stages and semi-finals matches.

During the 2019 NRL season, it was announced that the ground and the Cronulla leagues club would be undergoing renovations and as a result Cronulla revealed that for the next two years that they would be playing home matches away from their spiritual home with Kogarah Oval, WIN Stadium and the new Western Sydney Stadium as new temporary home grounds.

In the early 2020s, Shark Park came under scrutiny by fans and the media due to the fact the venue hosted finals matches despite its limited capacity and alleged poor facilities. NRL CEO Andrew Abdo stated in September 2025 that the NRL would be reviewing their finals venue policy saying "We haven't changed or reviewed the home finals policy for a while, and I think we're due for that, In this particular case, you have two Sydney teams [on Saturday], and you want as many fans as possible enjoying it live. The players enjoy that, and so do the fans. We need to focus on our fans and the fan experience. There comes a time you need to consider a minimum standard, potentially for finals, that might be above the regular season – the time is right to have a good, close look at it".

=== Soccer ===
The Sydney Olympic FC club played at the ground for two seasons, from 2001 until 2003, in the former National Soccer League.

== See also ==
- List of sports venues with the name Toyota
