= Terry Hughes (rugby league) =

Australian rugby league footballer

Personal information
- Full name: Terry Hughes

Playing information
- Position: Halfback
Club
Years	Team	Pld	T	G	FG	P
1967–70	Cronulla-Sutherland	58	8	171	11	388

Terry Hughes is an Australian former rugby league footballer who played in the 1960s and 1970s.

== Playing career ==
After playing for the Wentworthville club in Sydney's second division, he was signed by first grade New South Wales Rugby Football League premiership club Cronulla-Sutherland Sharks to be their halfback in their first season.

Also the new club's goal-kicker, that year Hughes was the Sharks' top-point scorer. He was also Cronulla-Sutherland's first representative player, turning out for Sydney Seconds against Country in the club's debut season.

The following season he won the inaugural Rothmans Medal for best and fairest player in 1968. Following the Sharks' signing of Tommy Bishop, Hughes returned to Wentworthville to play out the rest of his career.
