= 1972 Manly-Warringah Sea Eagles season =

- NSWRFL champions
- NSWRFL rank: 1st
- 1972 record: Wins: 20; draws: 1; losses: 3
- Points scored: For: 511; against: 277

Team information
- Secretary: (Australia) Ken Arthurson
- Coach: (Australia) Ron Willey
- Assistant coach: (Australia) Frank Stanton (Reserve Grade)
- Captain: (Australia) Fred Jones
- Stadium: Brookvale Oval

Top scorers
- Tries: (Australia) Bob Fulton (19)
- Goals: (Australia) Max Brown (29)
- Points: (Australia) Bob Fulton (73)
← 1971	1973 →

The 1972 Manly-Warringah Sea Eagles season was the 26th in the club's history since their entry into the then New South Wales Rugby Football League premiership in 1947. After 5 previous Grand Final losses, the Sea Eagles broke through for their first premiership win.

The 1972 Sea Eagles were coached by former Australian international and Manly fullback Ron Willey. Captaining the side was long serving hooker Fred Jones. The club competed in the New South Wales Rugby Football League's 1972 Premiership season and played its home games at the 25,000 capacity Brookvale Oval.

== Ladder ==
	Team	Pld	W	D	L	PF	PA	PD	Pts
1	Manly-Warringah	22	18	1	3	460	255	+205	37
2	Eastern Suburbs	22	17	1	4	514	297	+217	35
3	St. George	22	16	2	4	398	221	+177	34
4	South Sydney	22	14	0	8	456	331	+125	28
5	Newtown	22	11	2	9	402	371	+31	24
6	Canterbury-Bankstown	22	12	0	10	382	373	+9	24
7	Western Suburbs	22	8	1	13	367	398	-31	17
8	Cronulla-Sutherland	22	8	0	14	332	378	-46	16
9	North Sydney	22	7	1	14	320	405	-85	15
10	Balmain	22	6	1	15	333	455	-122	13
11	Penrith	22	5	1	16	278	490	-212	11
12	Parramatta	22	4	2	16	317	585	-268	10

== Regular season ==
Sunday 26 March	Manly-Warringah Sea Eagles	34 – 6	Penrith Panthers	Brookvale Oval, Sydney
	Tries: Ken Irvine (2), Derek Moritz (2), Bob Fulton, Ian Martin; Goals: Ray Branighan (6); Derek Moritz (2)	[ Report]	Tries: Goals: Len Killeen (3)	Attendance: 13,437; Referee: Keith Page

Monday 3 April	St. George Dragons	18 – 0	Manly-Warringah Sea Eagles	Kogarah Oval, Sydney
	Tries: Tony Branson, Bob Clapham; Goals: Graeme Langlands (6)	[ Report]	Tries: Goals:	Attendance: 6,182; Referee: Keith Holman

Sunday 9 April	Manly-Warringah Sea Eagles	14 – 13	Newtown Bluebags	Brookvale Oval, Sydney
	Tries: Bob Fulton (2); Goals: Derek Moritz (3); Ray Branighan (1)	[ Report]	Tries: Paul Dawson, Gary Sullivan, Lionel Williamson; Goals: John Bonham (2)	Attendance: 13,732; Referee: Barry Barnes

Saturday 15 April	Manly-Warringah Sea Eagles	23 – 16	South Sydney Rabbitohs	Sydney Cricket Ground, Sydney
	Tries: Ray Branighan (2), Ken Irvine (2), Bob Fulton; Goals: Ray Branighan (2); Derek Moritz (2)	[ Report]	Tries: Bob Honan, Bob McCarthy, Denis Pittard, Elwyn Walters; Goals: Eric Simms (2)	Attendance: 25,536; Referee: Keith Holman

Saturday 22 April	Manly-Warringah Sea Eagles	18 – 14	Western Suburbs Magpies	Brookvale Oval, Sydney
	Tries: Les Hanigan (3), Ken Irvine; Goals: Derek Moritz (3)	[ Report]	Tries: Stephen Knight, Olaf Prattl; Goals: Tony Ford (3); Stephen Satterley (1)	Attendance: 14,840; Referee: Keith Holman

Tuesday 25 April	Parramatta Eels	7 – 9	Manly-Warringah Sea Eagles	Cumberland Oval, Sydney
	Tries: Russ Devonshire; Goals: Graham Ernst (2)	[ Report]	Tries: Terry Randall; Goals: Ken Irvine (3)	Attendance: 8,129; Referee: Barry Barnes

Saturday 29 April	Eastern Suburbs Roosters	24 – 17	Manly-Warringah Sea Eagles	Sydney Cricket Ground, Sydney
	Tries: John Armstrong, John Brass, Mark Harris, Peter Moscatt, Allan McKean; Goals: Allan McKean (4); Field Goals: John Brass (1)	[ Report]	Tries: Bill Clare, Ken Irvine, Norm Pounder; Goals: Ken Irvine (4)	Attendance: 22,202; Referee: Keith Holman

Sunday 7 May	Manly-Warringah Sea Eagles	41 – 12	Canterbury-Bankstown Bulldogs	Brookvale Oval, Sydney
	Tries: Bob Fulton (3), Derek Moritz (2), Allan Maddalena, Allan Thomson, Gary Thoroughgood, Dennis Ward; Goals: Derek Moritz (3); Bob Fulton (2); Ken Irvine (2)	[ Report]	Tries: Ron Costello, Mick Trypas; Goals: Greg Purcell (2); Henry Tatana (1)	Attendance: 18,574; Referee: Keith Holman

Sunday 14 May	Balmain Tigers	25 – 15	Manly-Warringah Sea Eagles	Sydney Sports Ground, Sydney
	Tries: Terry Cross, Glen Capelin, Trevor Ryan, Geoff Starling; Goals: Dennis Preston (5)	[ Report]	Tries: Dennis Ward (2), Bob Fulton; Goals: Bob Fulton (3)	Attendance: 7,885; Referee: Barry Barnes

Sunday 21 May	Manly-Warringah Sea Eagles	19 – 5	Cronulla-Sutherland Sharks	Brookvale Oval, Sydney
	Tries: Max Brown, Ian Martin, Norm Pounder; Goals: Max Brown (3); Ken Irvine (2)	[ Report]	Tries: Bob Wear; Goals: Dave Cotter (1)	Attendance: 6,382; Referee: Richie Humphreys

Sunday 28 May	North Sydney Bears	6 – 18	Manly-Warringah Sea Eagles	North Sydney Oval, Sydney
	Tries: George Ambrum (2); Goals:	[ Report]	Tries: Bill Clare (3), Bob Fulton; Goals: Max Brown (3)	Attendance: 8,800; Referee: Barry Barnes

Sunday 4 June	Penrith Panthers	2 – 22	Manly-Warringah Sea Eagles	Penrith Park, Sydney
	Tries: Goals: Norm Gilligan (1)	[ Report]	Tries: Bill Clare (3), Fred Jones, Gary Thoroughgood, Dennis Ward; Goals: Max Brown (1); Mark Willoughby (1)	Attendance: 5,078; Referee: Keith Holman

Monday 12 June	Manly-Warringah Sea Eagles	15 – 15	St. George Dragons	Sydney Cricket Ground, Sydney
	Tries: Bill Hamilton, Ian Martin, Derek Moritz; Goals: Derek Moritz (2); Max Brown (1)	[ Report]	Tries: Barry Beath, Tony Branson, Graeme Langlands; Goals: Graeme Langlands (3)	Attendance: 37,343; Referee: Keith Holman

Sunday 25 June	Newtown Bluebags	9 – 10	Manly-Warringah Sea Eagles	Henson Park, Sydney
	Tries: Gary Sullivan; Goals: Ken Wilson (3)	[ Report]	Tries: Goals: Max Brown (3); Derek Moritz (1); Field Goals: Bob Fulton (1); Dennis Ward (1)	Attendance: Keith Holman; Referee: 8,838

Saturday 24 June	South Sydney Rabbitohs	4 – 12	Manly-Warringah Sea Eagles	Sydney Cricket Ground, Sydney
	Tries: Goals: Eric Simms (2)	[ Report]	Tries: Max Brown, Allan Thomson; Goals: Max Brown (3)	Attendance: 18,397; Referee: Laurie Bruyeres

Saturday 1 July	Western Suburbs Magpies	7 – 32	Manly-Warringah Sea Eagles	Sydney Cricket Ground, Sydney
	Tries: Jon Clark; Goals: Tony Ford (2)	[ Report]	Tries: Mal Reilly (2), Max Brown, Fred Jones, Allan Maddalena, Terry Randall; Goals: Max Brown (7)	Attendance: 10,241; Referee: Keith Holman

Sunday 9 July	Manly-Warringah Sea Eagles	32 – 10	Parramatta Eels	Brookvale Oval, Sydney
	Tries: Graham Eadie, Bill Hamilton, Terry Randall, Mal Reilly, Gary Thoroughgood, Dennis Ward; Goals: Graham Eadie (3); Max Brown (2); Derek Moritz (2)	[ Report]	Tries: Dennis Mount, Gary Pethybridge; Goals: Bland Liles (1); Dennis Mount (1)	Attendance: 11,451; Referee: Barry Barnes

Saturday 22 July	Manly-Warringah Sea Eagles	17 – 14	Eastern Suburbs Roosters	Sydney Cricket Ground, Sydney
	Tries: Dennis Ward (2), Graham Eadie, Ken Irvine; Goals: Bob Fulton (1); Field Goals: Bob Fulton (2); Dennis Ward (1)	[ Report]	Tries: Mark Harris (2); Goals: Peter Flanders (4)	Attendance: 30,968; Referee: Keith Holman

Sunday 30 July	Canterbury-Bankstown Bulldogs	16 – 30	Manly-Warringah Sea Eagles	Belmore Oval, Sydney
	Tries: Johnny Greaves, Norm Thomas; Goals: Henry Tatana (5)	[ Report]	Tries: Ken Irvine (2), Dennis Ward (2), Graham Eadie, Fred Jones; Goals: Max Brown (3); Graham Eadie (1)	Attendance: 11,579; Referee: Keith Page

Sunday 6 August	Manly-Warringah Sea Eagles	37 – 15	Balmain Tigers	Brookvale Oval, Sydney
	Tries: Bob Fulton (4), Ken Irvine (3), Ray Branighan, Mal Reilly; Goals: Graham Eadie (4); Max Brown (1)	[ Report]	Tries: Greg Fryer, Michael Ross, Bruce Warwick; Goals: Bruce Warwick (3)	Attendance: 15,297; Referee: Keith Holman

Sunday 13 August	Cronulla-Sutherland Sharks	10 – 15	Manly-Warringah Sea Eagles	Endeavour Field, Sydney
	Tries: Greg Allen, Ken Maddison; Goals: Barry Andrews (2)	[ Report]	Tries: Bob Fulton (2), Bob Moses; Goals: Ray Branighan (3)	Attendance: 8,145; Referee: Don MacDonald

Sunday 20 August	Manly-Warringah Sea Eagles	30 – 7	North Sydney Bears	Brookvale Oval, Sydney
	Tries: Bob Fulton (2), Allan Maddalena (2), Max Brown, Ken Irvine; Goals: Graham Eadie (6)	[ Report]	Tries: Bruce Walker; Goals: Barry Glasgow (2)	Attendance: 15,128; Referee: Keith Holman

== Finals ==
=== Major Semi-Final ===
Saturday 2 September	Manly-Warringah Sea Eagles	32 – 8	Eastern Suburbs Roosters	Sydney Cricket Ground, Sydney
	Tries: Bob Fulton (2), Graham Eadie, Ian Martin, Allan Thomson, Dennis Ward; Goals: Ray Branighan (6); Graham Eadie (1)	[ Report]	Tries: Jim Morgan, John Quayle; Goals: Allan McKean (1)	Attendance: 43,695; Referee: Keith Holman

=== Grand Final ===
Saturday 16 September

Manly-Warringah Sea Eagles	19 – 14	Eastern Suburbs Roosters
Tries: Fred Jones; Ray Branighan; Goals: Ray Branighan (6/8); Field Goals: Bob Fulton (1)		Tries: John Ballesty; Bill Mullins; Goals: Allan McKean (4/6)

Sydney Cricket Ground, Sydney
Attendance: 54,357
Referee: Keith Page
Player of the Match: Dennis Ward

Manly-Warringah	Eastern Suburbs

FB	1	Graham Eadie
LW	2	Ken Irvine
CE	3	Ray Branighan
CE	4	Bob Fulton
RW	5	Max Brown
FE	6	Ian Martin
HB	7	Dennis Ward
LK	8	Mal Reilly
SR	9	Terry Randall
SR	10	Allan Thomson
PR	11	John O'Neill
HK	12	Fred Jones (c)
PR	13	Bill Hamilton
Substitutions:
IC	14
IC	15
Coach:
(Australia) Ron Willey

FB	1	Allan McKean
LW	2	Jim Porter
CE	3	Harry Cameron
CE	4	Mark Harris
RW	5	Bill Mullins
FE	6	John Ballesty
HB	7	Kevin Junee
LK	8	Ron Coote (c)
SR	9	John Quayle
SR	10	Greg Bandiera
PR	11	Arthur Beetson
HK	12	Peter Moscatt
PR	13	John Armstrong
Substitutions:
IC	14	Laurie Freier
IC	15
Coach:
(Australia) Don Furner

After twenty-five years in the competition and five Grand Final losses, Manly finally broke through to win the club's first NSWRFL premiership.

In a controversial match, the Sea-Eagles downed the Eastern Suburbs Roosters 19 to 14, thus shedding their 'bridesmaids' tag. The Roosters were highly critical of referee Keith Page after the match, claiming both of Manly's tries shouldn't have been awarded. To add to their rage, Easts crossed for 2 tries that were disallowed.

A dour first half saw the teams go to the break at 4-all, before a try by hooker Fred Jones put Manly ahead. Jones appeared to drop the ball as he attempted to ground it, but was awarded the try nonetheless. For his part Jones contends that he did place the ball with downward pressure. Midway through the second half, controversy flared again when Manly centre Ray Branighan appeared to stop over the Eastern Suburbs try line after accepting what looked like a forward pass from prop Bill Hamilton. However, referee Page allowed it and the Manly fans began celebrating, knowing that at 19-4 their first premiership victory was assured. Although Easts fought back with two late tries to John Ballesty and Bill Mullins and brought the score to 19-14, time ran out for the Roosters and Manly had won their first ever premiership in first grade.

In the end, it was Manly's part-time goal kicker Ray Branighan who proved the difference, kicking 6 goals from 8 attempts.

== Player statistics ==
Note: Games and (sub) show total games played, e.g. 1 (1) is 2 games played.

Player	Games (sub)	Tries	Goals	FG	Points
(Australia) John Barber					
(Australia) Keith Blackett					
(Australia) Ray Branighan		4	24		60
(Australia) Max Brown		4	29		70
(Australia) John Bucknall					
(Australia) Bob Cameron					
(Australia) Bill Clare		7			21
(Australia) Graham Eadie		4	15		42
(Australia) Bob Fulton		19	6	4	73
(Australia) Bill Hamilton		2			6
(Australia) Les Hanigan		3			9
(Australia) Ken Irvine		13	11		61
(Australia) Fred Jones (c)		4			12
(Australia) Allan Maddalena		4			12
(Australia) Ian Martin		4			12
(Australia) Derek Moritz		5	18		51
(Australia) Bob Moses		1			3
(Australia) John O'Neill					
(Australia) Peter Peters					
(Australia) Norm Pounder		2			6
(Australia) Terry Randall		3			9
(England) Mal Reilly		4			12
(Australia) Allan Thomson		3			9
(Australia) Gary Thoroughgood		3			9
(Australia) Gary Train					
(Australia) Dennis Ward		10		2	32
(England) Graham Williams					
(Australia) Mark Willoughby			1		2
TOTAL		99	104	6	511

== Representative Players ==
=== International ===
- Australia – Ray Branighan, Bob Fulton, Fred Jones, John O'Neill, Dennis Ward

=== State ===
- New South Wales – Bob Fulton, Bill Hamilton, Ian Martin, Terry Randall

=== City vs Country ===
- City Seconds – Dennis Ward
