= 1973 Manly-Warringah Sea Eagles season =

Rugby Football Team

- NSWRFL champions
- NSWRFL rank: 1st
- 1973 record: Wins: 19; draws: 1; losses: 4
- Points scored: For: 524; against: 237

Team information
- Secretary: (Australia) Ken Arthurson
- Coach: (Australia) Ron Willey
- Assistant coach: (Australia) Frank Stanton (Reserve Grade)
- Captain: (Australia) Fred Jones
- Stadium: Brookvale Oval

Top scorers
- Tries: (Australia) Bob Fulton (18)
- Goals: (Australia) Graham Eadie (69)
- Points: (Australia) Graham Eadie (150)
← 1972	1974 →

The 1973 Manly-Warringah Sea Eagles season was the 27th in the club's history since their entry into the then New South Wales Rugby Football League premiership in 1947. Manly went into the 1973 season as the reigning premiers having won the 1972 Grand Final defeating Eastern Suburbs 19-14.

As they were in 1972, the 1973 Sea Eagles were coached by former Australian international and Manly fullback Ron Willey. Captaining the side was long serving hooker Fred Jones. The club competed in the New South Wales Rugby Football League's 1973 Premiership season and played its home games at the 25,000 capacity Brookvale Oval.

== Ladder ==
	Team	Pld	W	D	L	PF	PA	PD	Pts
1	Manly-Warringah	22	17	1	4	500	226	+274	35
2	Cronulla-Sutherland	22	17	0	5	389	219	+170	34
3	St. George	22	15	0	7	372	213	+159	30
4	Newtown	22	14	0	8	358	224	+134	28
5	Canterbury-Bankstown	22	12	1	9	369	269	+100	25
6	Eastern Suburbs	22	12	0	10	415	314	+101	24
7	South Sydney	22	11	1	10	345	367	-22	23
8	North Sydney	22	7	1	14	239	350	-101	15
9	Western Suburbs	22	7	0	15	310	414	-104	14
10	Balmain	22	7	0	15	254	495	-241	14
11	Parramatta	22	6	0	16	275	492	-217	12
12	Penrith	22	5	0	17	272	525	-253	10

== Regular season ==
Sunday 25 March	Manly-Warringah Sea Eagles	12 – 12	Canterbury-Bankstown Bulldogs	Brookvale Oval, Sydney
	Tries: Bob Fulton, Ken Irvine; Goals: Graham Eadie (3)	[ Report]	Tries: Bernard Lowther, Terrence Murphy; Goals: Henry Tatana (3)	Attendance: 14,154; Referee: Keith Holman

Saturday 31 March	St. George Dragons	0 – 13	Manly-Warringah Sea Eagles	Sydney Sports Ground, Sydney
	Tries: Goals:	[ Report]	Tries: Max Krilich, Johnny Mayes; Goals: Ray Branighan (3); Field Goals: Johnny Mayes (1)	Attendance: 14,444; Referee: Keith Holman

Saturday 7 April	Manly-Warringah Sea Eagles	10 – 20	Newtown Bluebags	Sydney Cricket Ground, Sydney
	Tries: Max Brown, Johnny Mayes; Goals: Ray Branighan (2)	[ Report]	Tries: Paul Dawson, Dennis Gardiner, Neil Pringle, Mark Robertson; Goals: Ken Wilson (4)	Attendance: 10,850; Referee: Keith Holman

Sunday 15 April	North Sydney Bears	7 – 30	Manly-Warringah Sea Eagles	North Sydney Oval, Sydney
	Tries: Mal McLachlan; Goals: Barry Glasgow (2)	[ Report]	Tries: Johnny Mayes (3), Bob Fulton, Ken Irvine, Fred Jones; Goals: Ray Branighan (6)	Attendance: 8,824; Referee: Keith Holman

Sunday 22 April	Manly-Warringah Sea Eagles	22 – 13	Eastern Suburbs Roosters	Brookvale Oval, Sydney
	Tries: Max Brown (3), Bob Fulton, Ken Irvine; Goals: Ray Branighan (3); Field Goals: Bob Fulton (1)	[ Report]	Tries: Bill Mullins (2), Jim Porter; Goals: Allan McKean (2)	Attendance: 17,616; Referee: Keith Page

Sunday 29 April	Parramatta Eels	10 – 0	Manly-Warringah Sea Eagles	Cumberland Oval, Sydney
	Tries: Owen Frith, Garry Thomas; Goals: Garry Thomas (2)	[ Report]	Tries: Goals:	Attendance: 6,988; Referee: Barry Barnes

Sunday 6 May	Manly-Warringah Sea Eagles	24 – 11	South Sydney Rabbitohs	Brookvale Oval, Sydney
	Tries: Bob Fulton (2), Ian Martin, Gary Thoroughgood; Goals: Peter Peters (6)	[ Report]	Tries: Denis Pittard; Goals: Eric Simms (4)	Attendance: 18,205; Referee: Barry Barnes

Sunday 13 May	Manly-Warringah Sea Eagles	41 – 5	Penrith Panthers	Brookvale Oval, Sydney
	Tries: Ken Irvine (3), Ray Branighan, Fred Jones, Ian Martin, Johnny Mayes, Mal Reilly, Gary Thoroughgood; Goals: Peter Peters (7)	[ Report]	Tries: Phillip Capper; Goals: Reg Walton (1)	Attendance: 9,630; Referee: Richie Humphreys

Sunday 20 May	Western Suburbs Magpies	13 – 17	Manly-Warringah Sea Eagles	Lidcombe Oval, Sydney
	Tries: Barry Bryant; Goals: Tony Ford (5)	[ Report]	Tries: Ray Branighan, Ken Irvine, Johnny Mayes, Mal Reilly, Peter Peters; Goals: Ray Branighan (1)	Attendance: 4,923; Referee: Jack Danzey

Sunday 27 May	Manly-Warringah Sea Eagles	12 – 8	Cronulla-Sutherland Sharks	Brookvale Oval, Sydney
	Tries: Bob Fulton (2), Ray Branighan, Max Brown; Goals:	[ Report]	Tries: Fred Dennehy (2); Goals: Barry Andrews (1)	Attendance: 14,065; Referee: Keith Page

Sunday 3 June	Balmain Tigers	13 – 33	Manly-Warringah Sea Eagles	Leichhardt Oval, Sydney
	Tries: Greg Fryer, Tim Murphy, Jeff Shield; Goals: Mark Tonks (2)	[ Report]	Tries: Bob Fulton (2), Rod Jackson (2), Fred Jones, Ian Martin, Johnny Mayes; Goals: Graham Eadie (5); Mal Reilly	Attendance: 6,066; Referee: Jack Danzey

Monday 11 June	Canterbury-Bankstown Bulldogs	9 – 17	Manly-Warringah Sea Eagles	Belmore Oval, Sydney
	Tries: Bernard Lowther; Goals: Henry Tatana (3)	[ Report]	Tries: Ray Branighan, Graham Eadie, Fred Jones; Goals: Graham Eadie (4)	Attendance: 18,216; Referee: Keith Holman

Saturday 16 June	Manly-Warringah Sea Eagles	4 – 3	St. George Dragons	Sydney Cricket Ground, Sydney
	Tries: Goals: Graham Eadie (2)	[ Report]	Tries: Ted Goodwin; Goals:	Attendance: 21,682; Referee: Laurie Bruyeres

Sunday 24 June	Newtown Bluebags	11 – 13	Manly-Warringah Sea Eagles	Henson Park, Sydney
	Tries: Paul Dawson, John Floyd; Goals: Ken Wilson (2); Field Goals: Ken Wilson (1)	[ Report]	Tries: Ken Irvine, Rod Jackson, Mal Reilly; Goals: Ray Branighan (2)	Attendance: Keith Holman; Referee: 9,633

Saturday 1 July	Manly-Warringah Sea Eagles	14 – 12	North Sydney Bears	Brookvale Oval, Sydney
	Tries: Max Brown, Johnny Mayes; Goals: Graham Eadie (4)	[ Report]	Tries: Phil Giersch, Barry Glasgow; Goals: Barry Glasgow (3)	Attendance: 12,344; Referee: Laurie Bruyeres

Saturday 7 July	Eastern Suburbs Roosters	15 – 10	Manly-Warringah Sea Eagles	Sydney Cricket Ground, Sydney
	Tries: Terry Stevens; Goals: John Brass (6)	[ Report]	Tries: Graham Eadie, Rod Jackson; Goals: Graham Eadie (2)	Attendance: 13,465; Referee: Keith Page

Sunday 15 July	Manly-Warringah Sea Eagles	53 – 8	Parramatta Eels	Brookvale Oval, Sydney
	Tries: Ken Irvine (3), Bob Fulton (2), Ian Martin (2), Graham Eadie, Warren Evans, Johnny Mayes, Peter Peters; Goals: Graham Eadie (10)	[ Report]	Tries: Barry Payne, Terry Reynolds; Goals: Keith Campbell (1)	Attendance: 12,082; Referee: Keith Page

Saturday 21 July	South Sydney Rabbitohs	24 – 31	Manly-Warringah Sea Eagles	Sydney Cricket Ground, Sydney
	Tries: Keith Edwards, Tom Mooney, Herbie Timms, Jeff Withers; Goals: Eric Simms (6)	[ Report]	Tries: Graham Eadie, Ken Irvine, Fred Jones, Ian Martin, Johnny Mayes; Goals: Graham Eadie (8)	Attendance: 24,693; Referee: Laurie Bruyeres

Sunday 29 July	Penrith Panthers	7 – 70	Manly-Warringah Sea Eagles	Penrith Park, Sydney
	Tries: Dave Irvine; Goals: Reg Walton (2)	[ Report]	Tries: Johnny Mayes (4), Alan Thompson (3), Bob Fulton (2), Ray Branighan, John Bucknall, Ian Martin, Peter Peters, Max Brown, Goals: Graham Eadie (14)	Attendance: 6,750; Referee: Keith Holman

Sunday 5 August	Manly-Warringah Sea Eagles	25 – 13	Western Suburbs Magpies	Brookvale Oval, Sydney
	Tries: Ian Martin (2), Peter Peters (2), Max Brown; Goals: Graham Eadie (4); Max Brown (1)	[ Report]	Tries: John Heyward, Russell Mullins, John O'Bryan; Goals: Stephen Satterley (2)	Attendance: 12,472; Referee: Don Macdonald

Saturday 11 August	Cronulla-Sutherland Sharks	9 – 7	Manly-Warringah Sea Eagles	Sydney Cricket Ground, Sydney
	Tries: Pete O'Brien; Goals: Steve Rogers (3)	[ Report]	Tries: Bob Moses; Goals: Graham Eadie (2)	Attendance: 8,831; Referee: Jack Danzey

Sunday 19 August	Manly-Warringah Sea Eagles	42 – 3	Balmain Tigers	Brookvale Oval, Sydney
	Tries: Bob Fulton (2), Peter Peters (2), Ray Branighan, Ken Irvine, Johnny Mayes, John O'Neill, Terry Randall, Mal Reilly; Goals: Graham Eadie (6)	[ Report]	Tries: Geoff Starling; Goals:	Attendance: 12,501; Referee: Keith Page

== Finals ==
=== Major Semi-Final ===
Saturday 1 September	Manly-Warringah Sea Eagles	14 – 4	Cronulla-Sutherland Sharks	Sydney Cricket Ground, Sydney
	Tries: Max Brown, Bob Fulton; Goals: Graham Eadie (3); Field Goals: Bob Fulton (2)	[ Report]	Tries: Goals: Steve Rogers (2)	Attendance: 41,898; Referee: Keith Page

=== Grand Final ===
Saturday 15 September

Manly-Warringah Sea Eagles	10 – 7	Cronulla-Sutherland Sharks
Tries: Bob Fulton (2); Goals: Graham Eadie (2/6)		Tries: Rick Bourke; Goals: Steve Rogers (2/5)

Sydney Cricket Ground, Sydney
Attendance: 52,044
Referee: Keith Page
Player of the Match: Bob Fulton

Manly-Warringah	Cronulla-Sutherland

FB	1	Graham Eadie
LW	2	Ken Irvine
CE	3	Ray Branighan
CE	4	Bob Fulton
RW	5	Max Brown
FE	6	Ian Martin
HB	7	Johnny Mayes
LK	8	Mal Reilly
SR	9	Terry Randall
SR	10	Peter Peters
PR	11	John O'Neill
HK	12	Fred Jones (c)
PR	13	Bill Hamilton
Substitutions:
IC	14	John Bucknall
IC	15
Coach:
(Australia) Ron Willey

FB	1	Warren Fisher
LW	2	Ray Corcoran
CE	3	Steve Rogers
CE	4	Eric Archer
RW	5	Bob Wear
FE	6	Chris Wellman
HB	7	Tommy Bishop (c)
LK	8	Greg Pierce
SR	9	John Maguire
SR	10	Ken Maddison
PR	11	Grahame Bowen
HK	12	Ron Turner
PR	13	Cliff Watson
Substitutions:
IC	14	Rick Bourke
IC	15
Coach:
(England) Tommy Bishop

After Cronulla-Sutherland's 14-4 loss in the major semi-final, Manly-Warringah expected the Sharks would be fired up for the Grand Final. And they were. Ian Heads wrote in the Sunday Telegraph the next day that It was a Grand Final as tough and dirty as any bar-room brawl. Alan Clarkson wrote in the Sun Herald The fare served up in the first half belonged in the Colosseum. The first half was not how the game's administrators would have wished to show-case rugby league, every tackle was loaded with menace and meant to damage. But from the melee Bob Fulton emerged and showed his unrivalled skill. Heads and Clarkson wrote of his "towering genius" and "football brilliance" respectively.

Manly's English import Malcolm Reilly, himself never one to take a backward step, was the first victim of the carnage. In the opening minute, Cronulla hooker Ron "Rocky" Turner set his sights on Reilly as the Englishman got an early kick away to take advantage of a strong breeze blowing towards the Bradman Stand (Paddington End). Turner missed Reilly the first time around, but didn't miss him a few minutes later. The Manly lock was left in agony from a badly bruised hip and had to leave the field for pain-killing injections. Knowing he probably wouldn't last the first half he then returned to the field and created mayhem despite the injections he received failing to work properly. He set about doing as much physical damage to Cronulla players as he could, but bowed out in the 25th minute and was replaced by reserve forward John Bucknall, who had played in Manly's winning Reserve Grade Grand Final side earlier in the day. Bucknall didn't think he would be needed and actually had a full lunch and soft drink shortly before coach Ron Willey told him that he was going to be on the bench for the first grade game.

After a number of brawls in the first half, referee Keith Page eventually called in all 26 players twice for mass cautions, threatening that any more foul play would result in players being sent off. Despite his warnings the back-alley tactics continued from both teams, and Page didn't send anyone from the field.

Then Fulton took over in the 29th and 58th minutes. 'Bozo' demonstrated power and pace in both tries. The first came from a brilliant Fred Jones flick pass which saw Fulton split Eric Archer and Steve Rogers just twenty-five metres from the line. Fulton ran around to touch down near the posts and give Graham Eadie an easier shot at conversion which he duly slotted through the posts. Manly took a 5-0 scoreline to the half time break.

The second Fulton try came after Eadie took a pass from five-eighth Ian Martin, then looked for Fulton and set him up perfectly. Fulton raced for the Brewongle Stand corner and managed to put the ball down before being bundled into touch by Rogers and replacement fullback Rick Bourke. From out wide Eadie missed the conversion to make it 8-2 (Steve Rogers had kicked a penalty goal before Fulton scored his second try).

Cronulla had to wait a long time before they dented the Manly line. It was in the 70th minute that the crack appeared. Trailing 8-2, the Sharks struck when lock Greg Pierce positioned Rick Bourke for a try (Bourke was flattened by Manly winger Max Brown as he scored, resulting in a broken thumb for Brown). Rogers easily kicked the conversion to reduce the deficit to just one point. Eadie stretched the lead to three points from a penalty kick and then the Sharks rallied and bombarded Manly. Ultimately, the Manly defence of John Mayes, Terry Randall, Peter Peters, Eadie and Fulton were up to the task. It will, however, go down in Sharks folklore that a Tommy Bishop flick pass in the dying moments failed to go to hand with the Manly line wide open. It was a set move Cronulla had successfully played all year, but had adjusted for the Grand Final in anticipation of Manly's familiarity with the standard move. As expected, the Manly defence reacted to snuff out the set play, leaving a gap that Bishop's pass managed to pinpoint. But in the heat of the moment, Sharks second-rower Ken Maddison also played for the old move, ran the wrong line and the ball went to ground - and with it went the premiership.

== Player statistics ==
Note: Games and (sub) show total games played, e.g. 1 (1) is 2 games played.

Player	Games (sub)	Tries	Goals	FG	Points
(Australia) John Barber					
(Australia) Bill Bradstreet					
(Australia) Ray Branighan		6	18		54
(Australia) Max Brown		9			27
(Australia) John Bucknall		1			3
(Australia) Bill Clare					
(Australia) Graham Eadie		4	69		150
(Australia) Warren Evans		1			3
(Australia) Bob Fulton		18		3	57
(Australia) Bill Hamilton		2			6
(Australia) Terry Hill					
(Australia) Ken Irvine		13			39
(Australia) Rod Jackson		4			12
(Australia) Fred Jones (c)		5			15
(Australia) Max Krilich		1			3
(Australia) Ian Martin		9			27
(Australia) Johnny Mayes		16		1	49
(Australia) Bob Moses		1			3
(Australia) John O'Neill		1			3
(Australia) Peter Peters		7	13		37
(Australia) Norm Pounder					
(Australia) Terry Randall		1			3
(England) Mal Reilly		4	1		14
(Australia) Alan Thompson		3			9
(Australia) Gary Thoroughgood		2			6
(Australia) Mark Willoughby					
TOTAL		106	101	4	524

== Representative Players ==
=== International ===
- Australia – Ray Branighan, Graham Eadie, Bob Fulton, Bill Hamilton, John O'Neill

=== State ===
- New South Wales – Ray Branighan, Graham Eadie, Bob Fulton, Bill Hamilton, Fred Jones, Ian Martin, Terry Randall

=== City vs Country ===
- City Firsts – Bob Fulton, Ray Branighan
- City Seconds – Bill Hamilton (c), Ian Martin, Johnny Mayes, Max Krilich, Terry Randall
- City U/23 – Chris Ryan
