= 1973 NSWRFL season =

Rugby league competition

1973 New South Wales Rugby Football League
- Teams: 12
- Premiers: Manly-Warringah (2nd title)
- Minor premiers: Manly-Warringah (3rd title)
- Matches played: 139
- Points scored: 4234
- Attendance: 1390810
- Top points scorer(s): Graeme Langlands (183)
- Wooden spoon: Penrith (1st spoon)
- Rothmans Medal: Ken Maddison
- Top try-scorer(s): Bob Fulton (18)

The 1973 New South Wales Rugby Football League premiership was the sixty-sixth season of the rugby league competition based in Sydney. Twelve district clubs from across the city, including six foundation clubs, competed for the J.J. Giltinan Shield and WD & HO Wills Cup during the season, which culminated in a grand final between Manly-Warringah and Cronulla-Sutherland. This season also saw the introduction of an Under-23s competition to replace the former “Third Grade” as well as a five-team finals series (rather than the previous four).

== Season summary ==
The 1973 NSWRFL season saw the introduction of the metric system to the playing field, and a five-team semi-final series. Twenty-two regular season rounds were played from March until August, resulting in a top five of Manly, Cronulla, St. George, Newtown and Canterbury who went on to battle it out in the finals.

The 1973 Rothmans Medal was awarded to Cronulla-Sutherland forward Ken Maddison. Rugby League Week awarded their player of the year award to Manly-Warringah's halfback Johnny Mayes.

The 1973 season also saw the retirement from the League of future Australian Rugby League Hall of Fame inductee, Ken Irvine. A legendary speedster who started his career with North Sydney in 1958, Irvine finished his stellar career with two deserved premierships playing for Manly-Warringah. Irvine also finished his career as the highest ever tryscorer in the Sydney premiership (the record still stands as of 2020). He crossed for 171 tries in 176 games for Norths and 41 in 60 games for Manly.

=== Teams ===
From 1973 onwards, Newtown were known as the “Jets”.

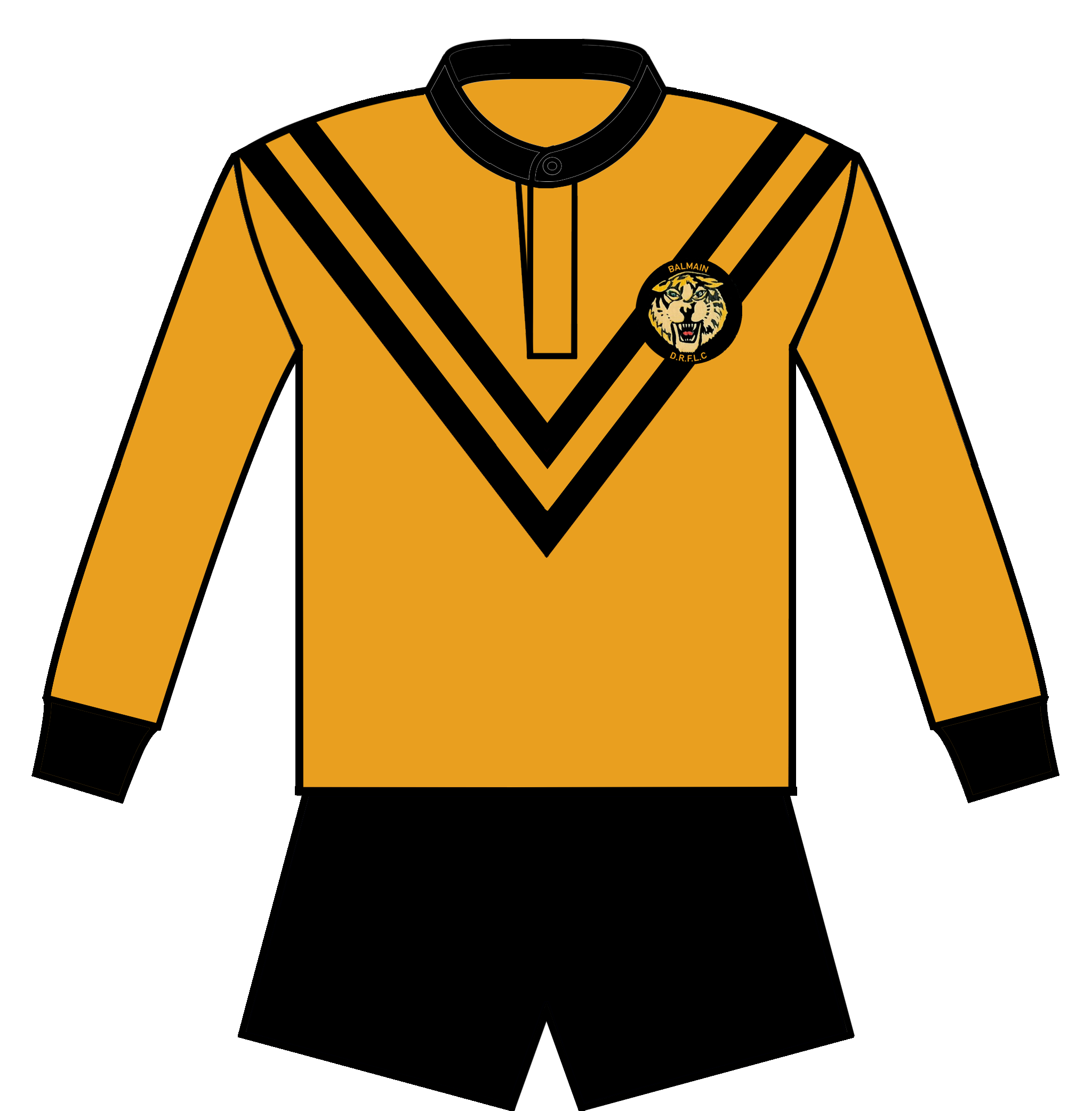
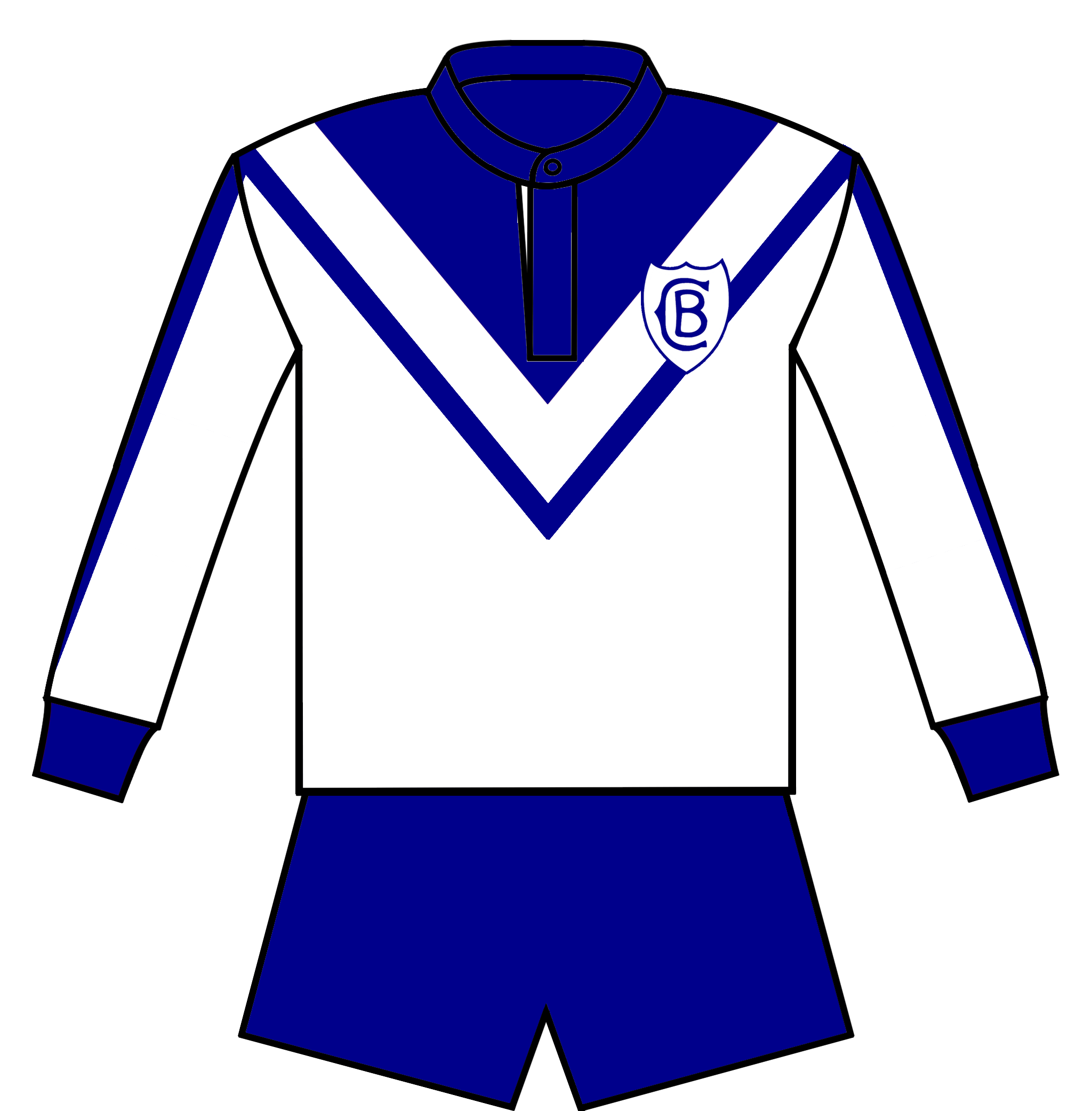
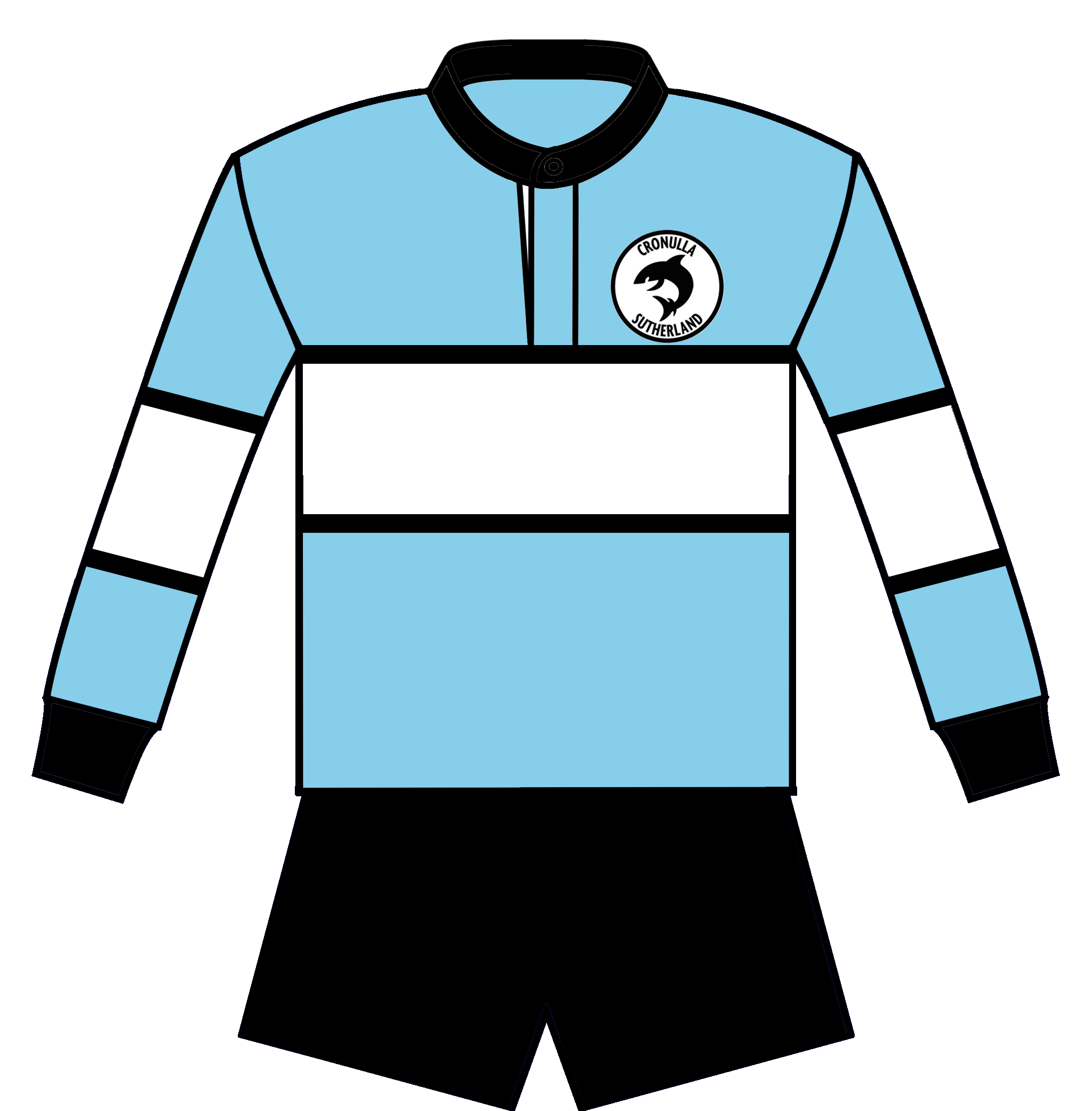
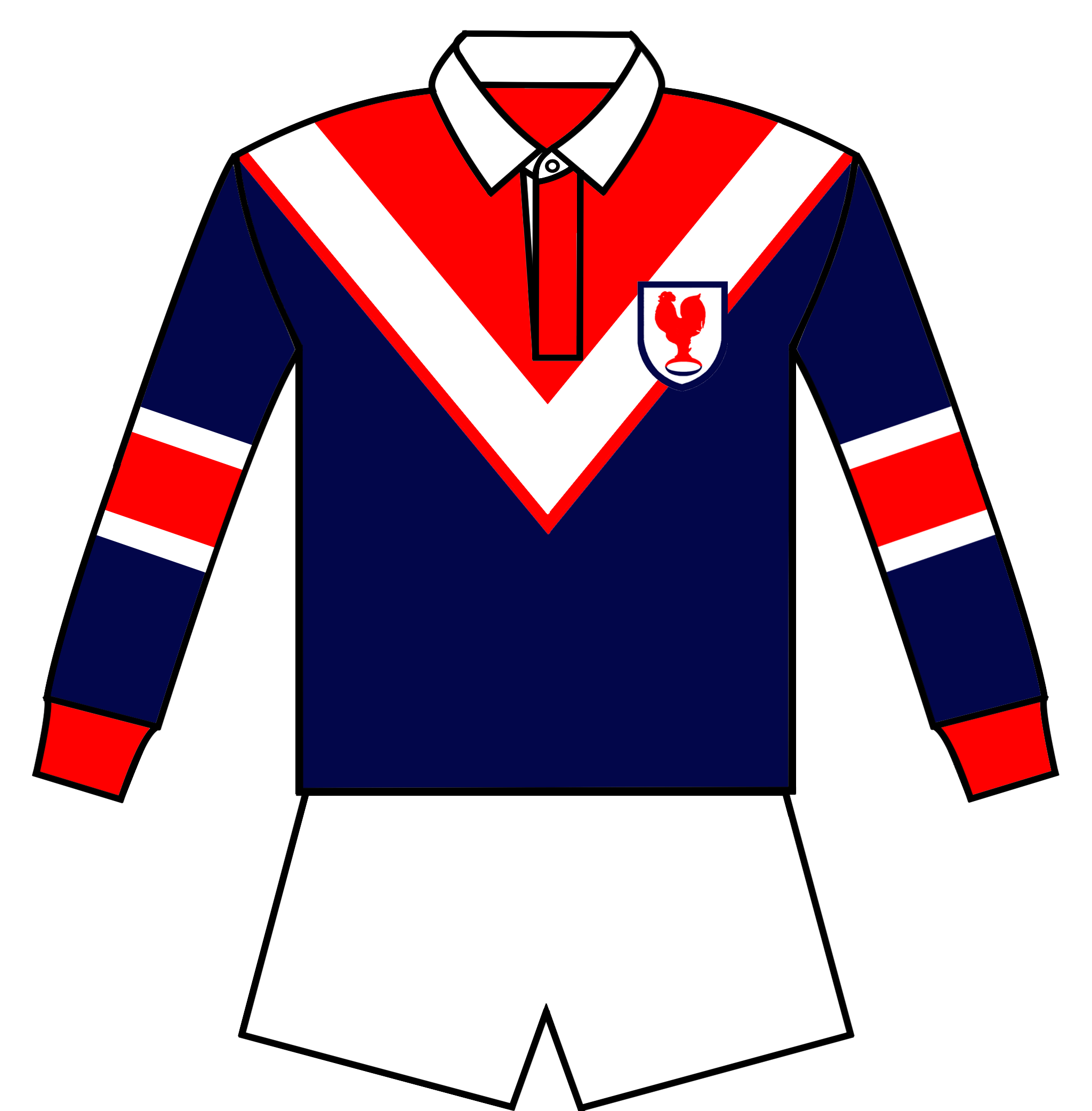
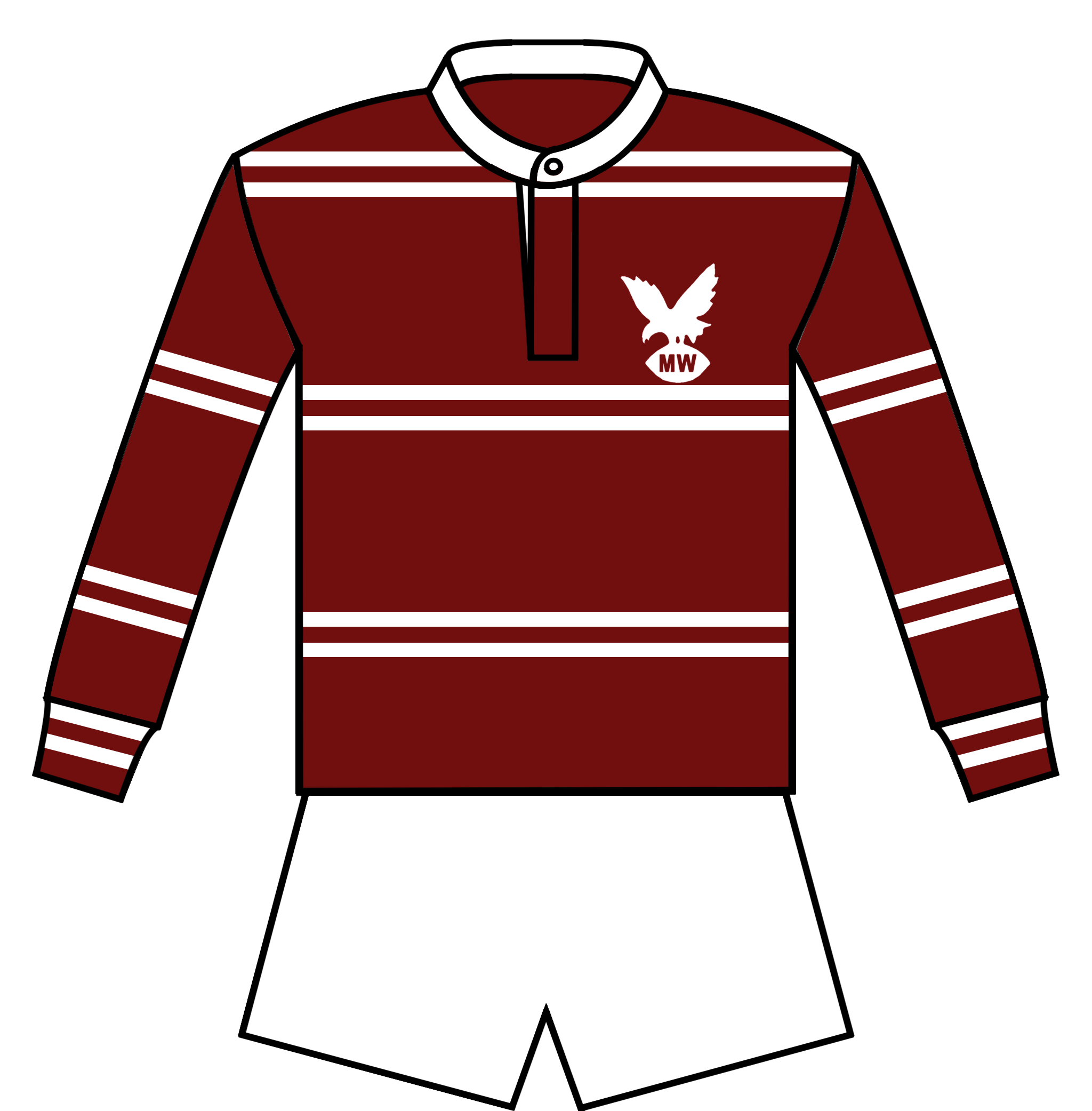
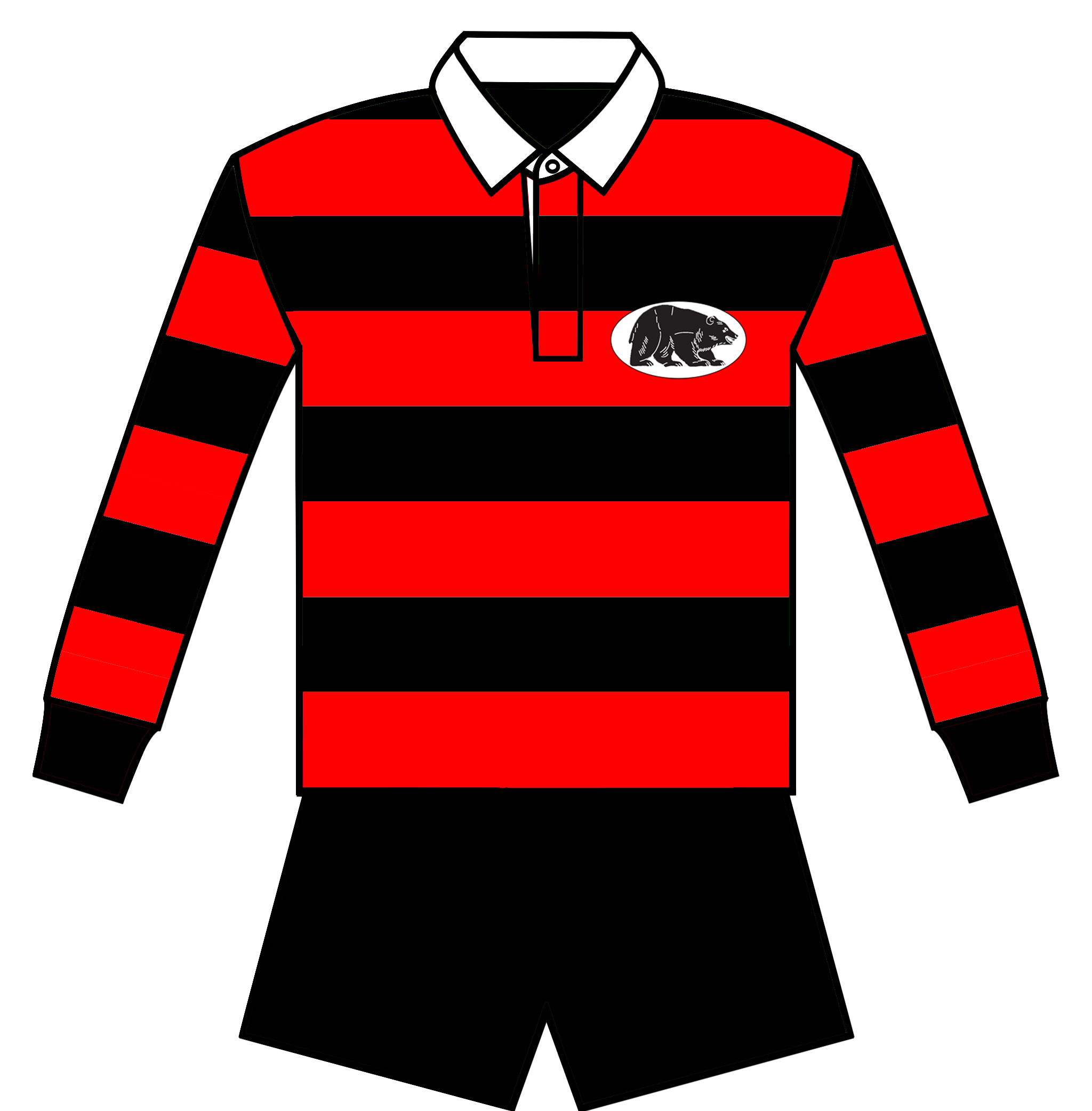
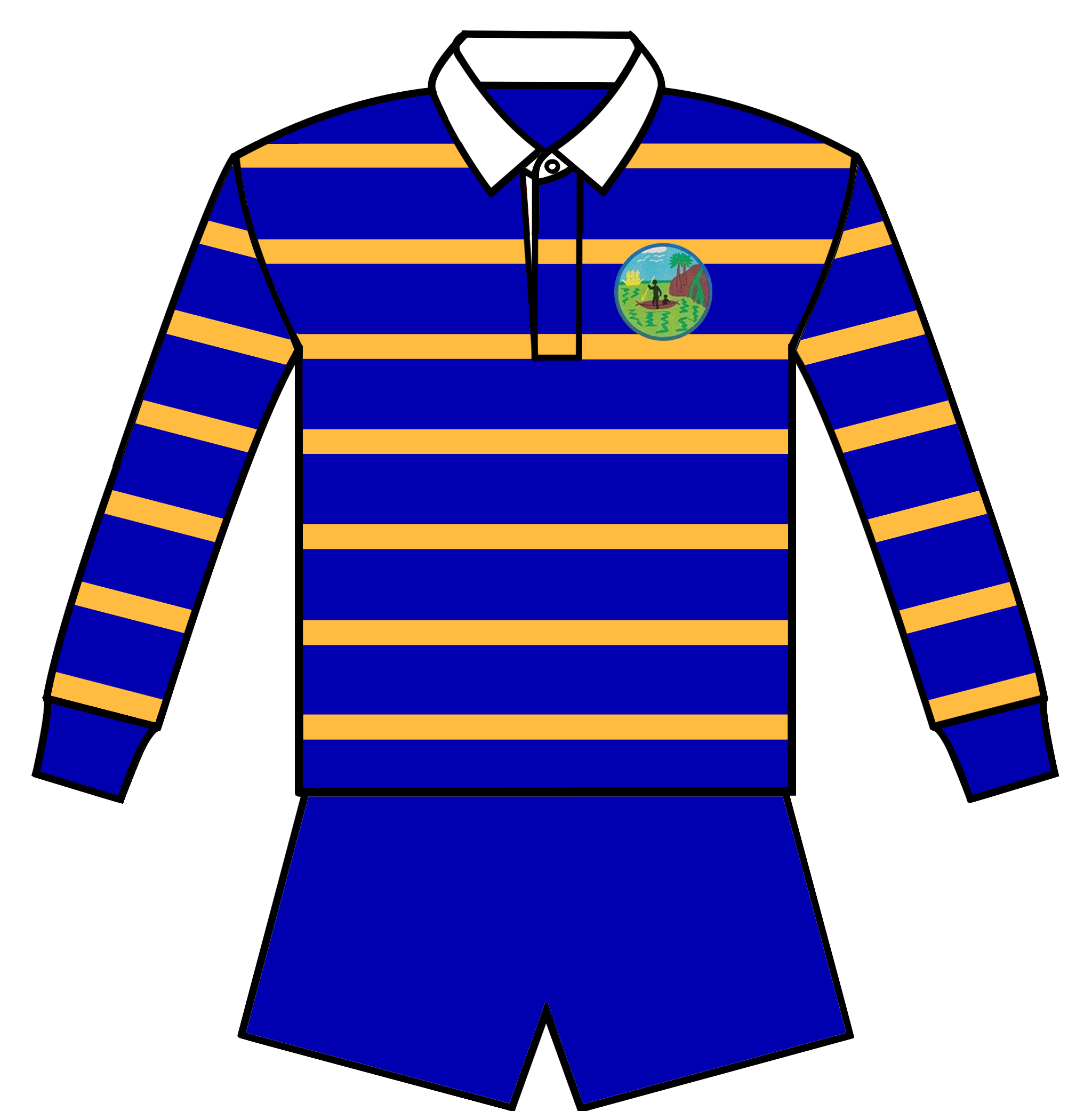
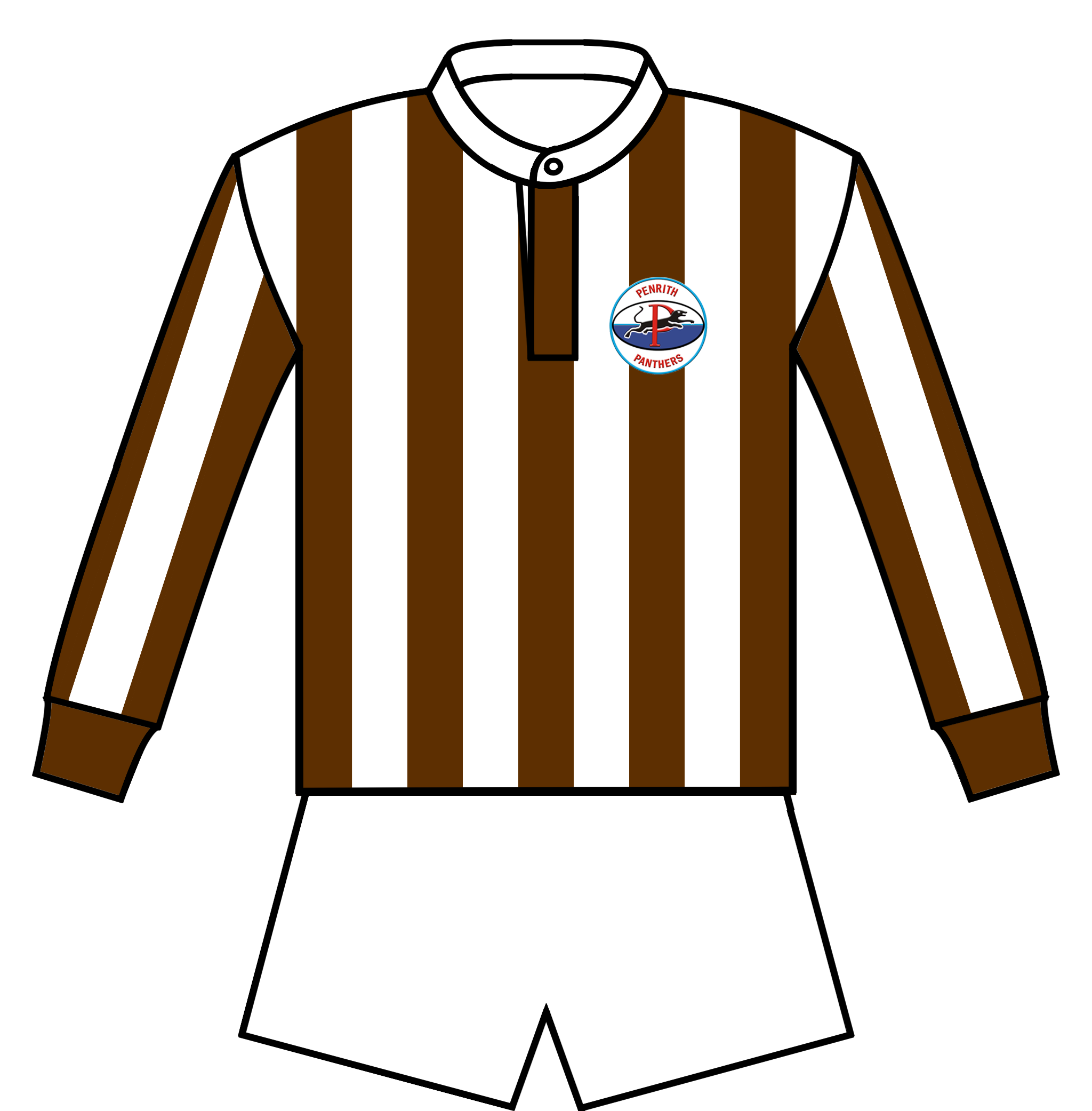
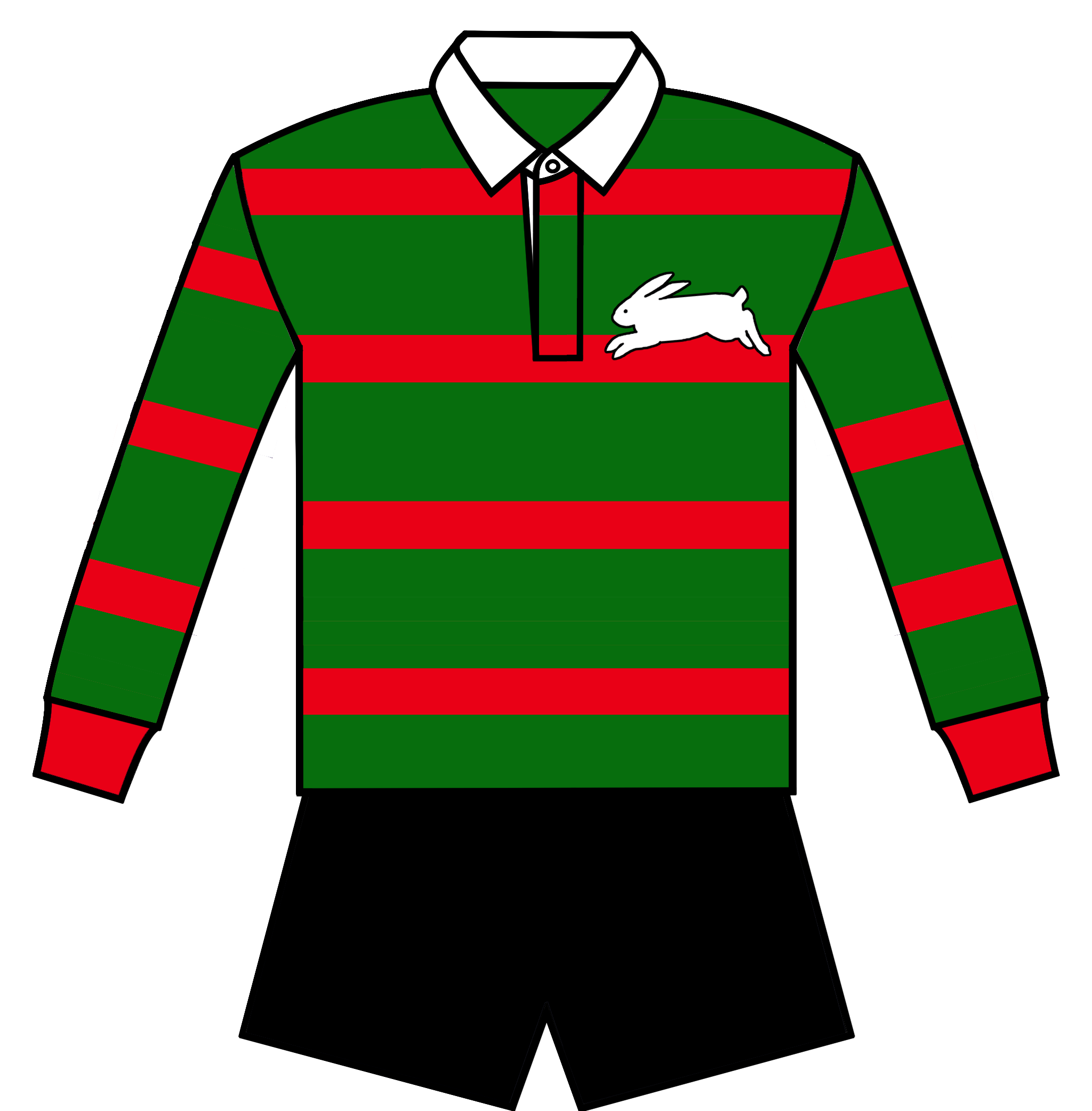
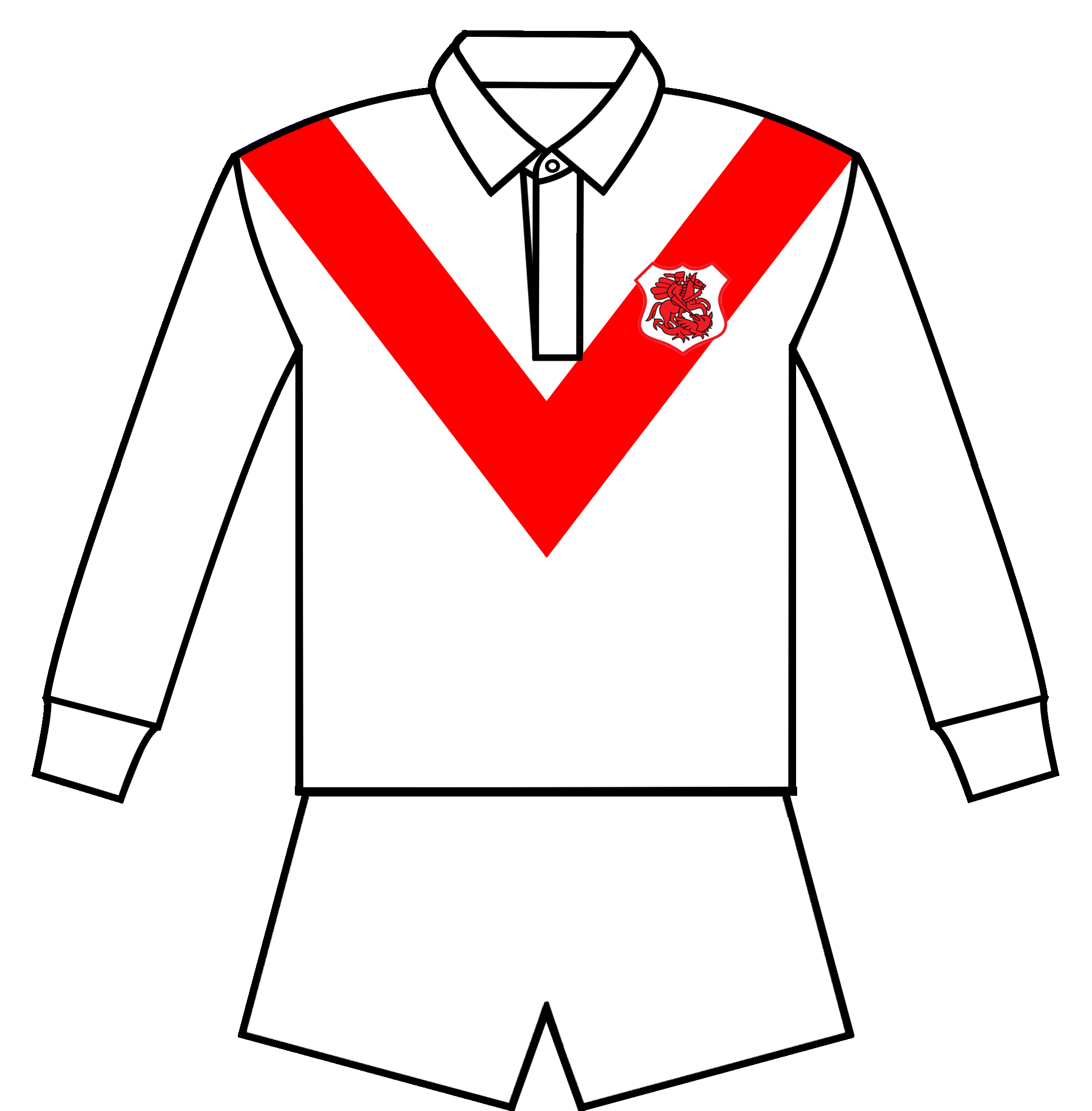
Balmain 66th season Ground: Leichhardt Oval; Coach: Leo Nosworthy; Captain: John Spencer	Canterbury-Bankstown 39th season Ground: Belmore Oval; Coach: Malcolm Clift; Captain: Geoff Connell	Cronulla-Sutherland 7th season Ground: Endeavour Field; Captain-coach: Tommy Bishop	Eastern Suburbs 66th season Ground: Sydney Sports Ground; Coach: Tony Paskins; Captain: Ron Coote
Manly-Warringah 27th season Ground: Brookvale Oval; Coach: Ron Willey; Captain: Fred Jones	Newtown Jets 66th season Ground: Henson Park; Coach: Jack Gibson; Captain: Lionel Williamson	North Sydney 66th season Ground: North Sydney Oval; Coach: Noel Kelly; Captain: Ross Warner	Parramatta 27th season Ground: Cumberland Oval; Coach: Dave Bolton; Captain: Bob McCarthy
Penrith 7th season Ground: Penrith Stadium; Coach: Bob Boland→Leo Trevena; Captain: Ron Lynch	South Sydney 66th season Ground: Redfern Oval; Coach: Clive Churchill; Captain: Bob McCarthy	St. George 53rd season Ground: Kogarah Jubilee Oval; Captain-coach: Graeme Langlands	Western Suburbs 66th season Ground: Lidcombe Oval; Coach: Don Parish; Captain: Tommy Raudonikis

== Regular season ==
Team	1	2	3	4	5	6	7	8	9	10	11	12	13	14	15	16	17	18	19	20	21	22	F1	F2	F2R	F3	GF
Balmain	**STG** **−15**	NOR +3	**PAR** **+7**	PEN −23	**CRO** **+3**	**CBY** **−15**	**NEW** **−24**	**EAS** **−20**	**SOU** **−2**	**WES** **−5**	**MAN** **−20**	STG −15	**NOR** **+6**	PAR −11	**PEN** **+5**	CRO −21	CBY −35	NEW −13	EAS +1	SOU −12	WES +4	MAN −39					
Canterbury-Bankstown	MAN; 0	NEW −6	**EAS** **+1**	**SOU** **+9**	WES +28	BAL +15	STG −16	**NOR** **+11**	**PAR** **+19**	PEN −5	**CRO** **−14**	**MAN** **−8**	**NEW** **−11**	EAS −7	SOU +11	**WES** **+10**	**BAL** **+35**	**STG** **−3**	NOR +10	PAR +6	**PEN** **+22**	CRO −7	NEW −11				
Cronulla-Sutherland	**NEW** **+3**	EAS −3	**SOU** **+1**	WES +26	BAL −3	**STG** **+7**	NOR −6	PAR +6	**PEN** **+14**	MAN −4	CBY +14	NEW +9	**EAS** **+5**	SOU +10	**WES** **+7**	**BAL** **+21**	STG −5	**NOR** **+11**	**PAR** **+29**	PEN +19	**MAN** **+2**	**CBY** **+7**	**STG** **+18**	MAN −10	X	**NEW** **+9**	MAN −3
Eastern Suburbs	PEN −11	**CRO** **+3**	CBY −1	**NEW** **+2**	MAN −9	**SOU** **−1**	WES −9	BAL +20	**STG** **−9**	**NOR** **+1**	PAR +41	**PEN** **+34**	CRO −5	**CBY** **+7**	NEW +3	**MAN** **+5**	SOU −2	**WES** **−10**	**BAL** **−1**	STG +2	NOR +10	**PAR** **+31**					
Manly-Warringah	**CBY**; **0**	STG +13	**NEW** **−10**	NOR +23	**EAS** **+9**	PAR −10	**SOU** **+13**	**PEN** **+36**	WES +4	**CRO** **+4**	BAL +20	CBY +8	**STG** **+1**	NEW +2	**NOR** **+2**	EAS −5	**PAR** **+45**	SOU +7	PEN +63	**WES** **+12**	CRO −2	**BAL** **+39**	X	**CRO** **+10**	X	X	**CRO** **+3**
Newtown	CRO −3	**CBY** **+6**	MAN +10	EAS −2	SOU −6	**WES** **+2**	BAL +24	**STG** **+1**	NOR +5	**PAR** **+8**	**PEN** **+20**	**CRO** **−9**	CBY +11	**MAN** **−2**	**EAS** **−3**	**SOU** **−1**	WES +17	**BAL** **+13**	STG −18	**NOR** **+20**	PAR +31	PEN +10	**CBY** **+11**	STG; 0	**STG** **+3**	CRO −9	
North Sydney	WES +17	**BAL** **−3**	**STG** **−27**	**MAN** **−23**	PAR +3	**PEN** **+6**	**CRO** **+6**	CBY −11	**NEW** **−5**	EAS −1	SOU; 0	**WES** **−9**	BAL −6	STG +3	MAN −2	**PAR** **+1**	PEN −1	CRO −11	**CBY** **−10**	NEW −20	**EAS** **−10**	**SOU** **+2**					
Parramatta	SOU +17	**WES** **+9**	BAL −7	STG −14	**NOR** **−3**	**MAN** **+10**	PEN +9	**CRO** **−6**	CBY −19	NEW −8	**EAS** **−41**	**SOU** **+8**	WES −3	**BAL** **+11**	**STG** **−23**	NOR −1	MAN −45	**PEN** **−14**	CRO −29	**CBY** **−6**	**NEW** **−31**	EAS −31					
Penrith	**EAS** **+11**	SOU −10	**WES** **−7**	**BAL** **+23**	STG −6	NOR −6	**PAR** **−9**	MAN −36	CRO −14	**CBY** **+5**	NEW −20	EAS −34	**SOU** **−15**	WES −15	BAL −5	**STG** **−16**	**NOR** **+1**	PAR +14	**MAN** **−63**	**CRO** **−19**	CBY −22	**NEW** **−10**					
South Sydney	**PAR** **−17**	**PEN** **+10**	CRO −1	CBY −9	**NEW** **+6**	EAS +1	MAN −13	**WES** **+7**	BAL +2	STG +2	**NOR**; **0**	PAR −8	PEN +15	**CRO** **−10**	**CBY** **−11**	NEW +1	**EAS** **+2**	**MAN** **−7**	WES +7	**BAL** **+12**	**STG** **−9**	NOR −2					
St. George	BAL +15	**MAN** **−13**	NOR +27	**PAR** **+14**	**PEN** **+6**	CRO −7	**CBY** **+16**	NEW −1	EAS +9	**SOU** **−2**	**WES** **+8**	**BAL** **+15**	MAN −1	**NOR** **−3**	PAR +23	PEN +16	**CRO** **+5**	CBY +3	**NEW** **+18**	**EAS** **−2**	SOU +9	WES +4	CRO −18	**NEW**; **0**	NEW −3		
Western Suburbs	**NOR** **−17**	PAR −9	PEN +7	**CRO** **−26**	**CBY** **−28**	NEW −2	**EAS** **+9**	SOU −7	**MAN** **−4**	BAL +5	STG −8	NOR +9	**PAR** **+3**	**PEN** **+15**	CRO −7	CBY −10	**NEW** **−17**	EAS +10	**SOU** **−7**	MAN −12	**BAL** **−4**	**STG** **−4**					
Team	1	2	3	4	5	6	7	8	9	10	11	12	13	14	15	16	17	18	19	20	21	22	F1	F2	F2R	F3	GF

Bold – Home game
X – Bye
Opponent for round listed above margin

=== Ladder ===
	Team	Pld	W	D	L	PF	PA	PD	Pts
1	Manly	22	17	1	4	500	226	+274	35
2	Cronulla	22	17	0	5	389	219	+170	34
3	St. George	22	15	0	7	372	213	+159	30
4	Newtown	22	14	0	8	358	224	+134	28
5	Canterbury	22	12	1	9	369	269	+100	25
6	Eastern Suburbs	22	12	0	10	415	314	+101	24
7	South Sydney	22	11	1	10	345	367	-22	23
8	North Sydney	22	7	1	14	239	340	-101	15
9	Western Suburbs	22	7	0	15	310	414	-104	14
10	Balmain	22	7	0	15	254	495	-241	14
11	Parramatta	22	6	0	16	275	492	-217	12
12	Penrith	22	5	0	17	272	525	-253	10

=== Ladder progression ===
- Numbers highlighted in green indicate that the team finished the round inside the top 5.
- Numbers highlighted in blue indicates the team finished first on the ladder in that round.
- Numbers highlighted in red indicates the team finished last place on the ladder in that round.

	Team	1	2	3	4	5	6	7	8	9	10	11	12	13	14	15	16	17	18	19	20	21	22
1	Manly-Warringah	1	3	3	5	7	7	9	11	13	15	17	19	21	23	25	25	27	29	31	33	33	35
2	Cronulla-Sutherland	2	2	4	6	6	8	8	10	12	12	14	16	18	20	22	24	24	26	28	30	32	34
3	St. George	2	2	4	6	8	8	10	10	12	12	14	16	16	16	18	20	22	24	26	26	28	30
4	Newtown	0	2	4	4	4	6	8	10	12	14	16	16	18	18	18	18	20	22	22	24	26	28
5	Canterbury-Bankstown	1	1	3	5	7	9	9	11	13	13	13	13	13	13	15	17	19	19	21	23	25	25
6	Eastern Suburbs	0	2	2	4	4	4	4	6	6	8	10	12	12	14	16	18	18	18	18	20	22	24
7	South Sydney	0	2	2	2	4	6	6	8	10	12	13	13	15	15	15	17	19	19	21	23	23	23
8	North Sydney	2	2	2	2	4	6	8	8	8	8	9	9	9	11	11	13	13	13	13	13	13	15
9	Western Suburbs	0	0	2	2	2	2	4	4	4	6	6	8	10	12	12	12	12	14	14	14	14	14
10	Balmain	0	2	4	4	6	6	6	6	6	6	6	6	8	8	10	10	10	10	12	12	14	14
11	Parramatta	2	4	4	4	4	6	8	8	8	8	8	10	10	12	12	12	12	12	12	12	12	12
12	Penrith	2	2	2	4	4	4	4	4	4	6	6	6	6	6	6	6	8	10	10	10	10	10

== Finals ==
Home	Score	Away	Match Information
Home	Score	Away	Date and Time	Venue	Referee	Crowd
Qualifying Finals
Cronulla-Sutherland	18–0	St. George	25 August 1973	Sydney Cricket Ground	Keith Page	37,778
Newtown	13–2	Canterbury-Bankstown	26 August 1973	Sydney Sports Ground	Keith Page	17,778
Semi-finals
Manly-Warringah	14–4	Cronulla-Sutherland	1 September 1973	Sydney Cricket Ground	Keith Page	41,898
St. George	12–12	Newtown	2 September 1973	Sydney Cricket Ground	Keith Page	24,390
St. George	5–8	Newtown	4 September 1973	Sydney Sports Ground	Keith Page	27,791
Preliminary final
Cronulla-Sutherland	20–11	Newtown	8 September 1973	Sydney Cricket Ground	Keith Page	30,649
Grand final
Manly-Warringah	10–7	Cronulla-Sutherland	15 September 1973	Sydney Cricket Ground	Keith Page	52,044

=== Chart ===
Qualifying final
2	Cronulla-Sutherland	18
3	St. George	0
4	Newtown	13
5	Canterbury	2

Major semi-final
1	Manly	14
Cronulla-Sutherland	4
Minor semi-final
St. George	5*
Newtown	8*

Preliminary final
Cronulla-Sutherland	20
Newtown	11

Grand final
Manly	10
Cronulla-Sutherland	7

* - Indicates only the replay match, and not the match ending in a draw.

=== Grand final ===
Manly-Warringah Sea Eagles	Position	Cronulla-Sutherland Sharks
1. Graham Eadie	FB	1. Warren Fisher
2. Ken Irvine	WG	2. Ray Corcoran
3. Ray Branighan	CE	3. Steve Rogers
4. Bob Fulton	CE	4. Eric Archer
5. Max Brown	WG	5. Bob Wear
6. Ian Martin	FE	6. Chris Wellman
7. John Mayes	HB	7. Tommy Bishop (c)
13. Bill Hamilton	PR	13. Cliff Watson
12. Fred Jones (c)	HK	12. Ron Turner
11. John O'Neill	PR	11. Grahame Bowen
10. Peter Peters	SR	10. Ken Maddison
9. Terry Randall	SR	9. John Maguire
8. Mal Reilly	LK	8. Greg Pierce
14. John Bucknall	Bench	19. Rick Bourke
Ron Willey	Coach	Tommy Bishop

After Cronulla-Sutherland's 14–4 loss in the major semi-final, Manly-Warringah expected the Sharks would be fired up for the grand final. And they were. Ian Heads wrote in the Sunday Telegraph the next day that It was a grand final as tough and dirty as any bar-room brawl. Alan Clarkson wrote in the Sun Herald The fare served up in the first half belonged in the Colosseum. The first half was not how the game's administrators would have wished to show-case rugby league, every tackle was loaded with menace and meant to damage. Nevertheless, from the melee Bob Fulton emerged and showed his unrivalled skill. Heads and Clarkson wrote of his "towering genius" and "football brilliance" respectively.

Manly's English import Malcolm Reilly, himself never one to take a backward step, was the first victim of the carnage. In the opening minute, Cronulla hooker Ron "Rocky" Turner set his sights on Reilly as the Englishman got an early kick away to take advantage of a strong breeze blowing towards the Bradman Stand (Paddington End). Turner missed Reilly the first time around, but didn't miss him a few minutes later. The Manly lock was left in agony from a badly bruised hip and had to leave the field for painkilling injections. Knowing he probably wouldn't last the first half he then returned to the field and created mayhem despite the injections he received failing to work properly. He set about doing as much physical damage to Cronulla players as he could, but bowed out in the 25th minute and was replaced by reserve forward John Bucknall, who had played in Manly's winning Reserve Grade Grand final side earlier in the day. Bucknall didn't think he would be needed and actually had a full lunch and soft drink shortly before the first grade game began.

After a number of brawls in the first half, referee Keith Page eventually called in all 26 players twice for mass cautions, threatening that any more foul play would result in players being sent off. Despite his warnings the back-alley tactics continued from both teams, and Page didn't send anyone from the field.

Then Fulton took over in the 29th and 58th minutes. “Bozo” demonstrated power and pace in both tries. The first came from a brilliant Fred Jones flick pass which saw Fulton split Eric Archer and Steve Rogers just twenty-five metres from the line. Fulton ran around to touch down near the posts and give Graham Eadie an easier shot at conversion which he duly slotted through the posts. Manly took a 5–0 scoreline to the half time break.

The second Fulton try came after Eadie took a pass from five-eighth Ian Martin, then looked for Fulton and set him up perfectly. Fulton raced for the Brewongle Stand corner and managed to put the ball down before being bundled into touch by Rogers and replacement fullback Rick Bourke. From out wide Eadie missed the conversion to make it 8–2 after Steve Rogers had previously kicked a penalty goal.

Cronulla had to wait a long time before they dented the Manly line. It was in the 70th minute that the crack appeared. Trailing 8–2, the Sharks struck when lock Greg Pierce positioned Rick Bourke for a try (Bourke was flattened by Manly winger Max Brown as he scored, resulting in a broken thumb for Brown). Rogers easily kicked the conversion to reduce the deficit to just one point. Eadie stretched the lead to three points from a penalty kick and then the Sharks rallied and bombarded Manly. Ultimately, the Manly defence of John Mayes, Terry Randall, Peter Peters, Eadie and Fulton were up to the task. It will, however, go down in Sharks folklore that a Tommy Bishop flick pass in the dying moments failed to go to hand with the Manly line wide open. It was a set move Cronulla had successfully played all year, but had adjusted for the grand final in anticipation of Manly's familiarity with the standard move. As expected, the Manly defence reacted to snuff out the set play, leaving a gap that Bishop's pass managed to pinpoint. However, in the heat of the moment, Sharks second-rower Ken Maddison also played for the old move, ran the wrong line and the ball went to ground – and with it went the premiership.

Manly-Warringah 10 (Tries: Fulton 2. Goals: Eadie 2/6)

Cronulla-Sutherland 7 (Tries: Bourke. Goals: Rogers 2/5)

Man of the Match: Bob Fulton (Manly)
Referee: Keith Page
Attendance: 52,044

== Player statistics ==
The following statistics are as of the conclusion of Round 22.

Top 5 point scorers

Points	Player	Tries	Goals	Field Goals
169	Graeme Langlands	5	77	0
165	Henry Tatana	1	81	0
140	Graham Eadie	4	64	0
140	Tony Ford	0	70	0
131	Eric Simms	2	62	1

Top 5 try scorers

Tries	Player
16	Johnny Mayes
15	Bob Fulton
15	Bill Mullins
13	Ken Irvine
13	Bernie Lowther
13	Mark Harris

Top 5 goal scorers

Goals	Player
81	Henry Tatana
77	Graeme Langlands
70	Tony Ford
64	Graham Eadie
62	Eric Simms
