= Moscatt =

Moscatt is a surname. Notable people with the surname include:

- Peter Moscatt (1943–2019), Australian rugby league footballer
- Valentina Moscatt (born 1987), Italian judoka
