= Max Brown (rugby league) =

Australian rugby league footballer

Personal information
- Born: 23 December 1946 (age 79) Lilyfield, New South Wales, Australia

Playing information
- Position: Wing
Club
Years	Team	Pld	T	G	FG	P
1966–70	Canterbury-Bankstown	64	24	6	0	84
1971–75	Manly-Warringah	64	20	33	0	126
	Total	128	44	39	0	210

Max Brown (born 23 December 1946) is an Australian former rugby league footballer who played for the Canterbury Bankstown and Manly-Warringah in the New South Wales Rugby League. Brown played 128 games over a nine-year career, winning the 1972 and 1973 premierships with Manly. His position of choice was on the Wing.

Brown was also the founder of the Men of League foundation in 1999.

== Career ==
=== Canterbury-Bankstown ===
Brown, a goal kicking winger, was a Canterbury-Bankstown junior and made his first grade debut in 1966. He was the Berries (as the Bulldogs were then known) top try scorer in 1967 scoring 10 tries, but injury kept him out of the teams finals campaign, which famously included stopping the St. George Dragons in the preliminary final, ending the Dragons bid for a 12th straight premiership. Canterbury would go down 10–12 to the South Sydney Rabbitohs in the Grand Final.

Max Brown played a further 3 seasons with Canterbury, totaling 24 tries and 6 goals from 64 games before signing to play with Manly from 1971.

=== Manly-Warringah Sea Eagles ===
Brown was signed by Manly boss Ken Arthurson and for five years played alongside the likes of Graham Eadie, Ken Irvine, Bob Fulton, Terry Randall, and English hard man Mal Reilly. He was a member of the Sea Eagles first two premiership's in 1972 and 1973 over Eastern Suburbs and Cronulla respectively and was the Sea Eagles leading goal kicker in 1972 with 29 goals.

Brown, who in an era when foul play was still rife in rugby league, wasn't one who often got involved in dirty play, though he did hit replacement Cronulla fullback Rick Bourke with a swinging arm as Bourke crossed for Cronulla's only try of the 1973 Grand Final at the Sydney Cricket Ground. Bourke was flattened and Brown broke his right thumb in the incident. Some 30 years later Brown was able to catch up with Bourke and apologise for the incident (the 1973 GF was known as the toughest of them all with many fights breaking out during the game).

Max Brown retired from playing after 1975. He played 128 games in 9 seasons (64 for both Canterbury and Manly), scoring 44 tries and kicking 39 goals.

== Personal life ==
Brown, like South Sydney's dual international winger Michael Cleary, sometimes worked as a model outside of the game at a time when working class rugby league players didn't do such things, and years before players such as Andrew Ettingshausen and Craig Wing were able to use their good looks to earn a living away from rugby league.

== Men of League ==
In 1999 Max Brown was diagnosed with cancer that he had reportedly had for over 7 years (it was only found out when the tumor burst inside him resulting in emergency surgery). The cancer was believed to have been caused by a simple rub down cream he and other players had been using for years after training and games. Brown was forced to take over 6 months off from work while he was undergoing treatment, and it was during this time that he came up with the idea for the Men of League foundation to assist rugby league players, coaches, referees, officials and administrators – from all levels of the game – plus members of their families who have fallen on hard times

After struggling to get the foundation up and running for six months, Brown, Jim Hall and Ron Coote contacted current National Rugby League auditor Ian Schubert who jumped on board and helped organise the first ever Men of League function at the NSW Leagues Club in Sydney.
