= Warren Fisher =

Warren Fisher may refer to:

- Sir Warren Fisher (civil servant), British civil servant
- Warren Fisher (rugby league), Australian rugby league player
- Warren Samuel Fisher, American entomologist

== See also ==
- Warren Fischer, co-founder of electroclash duo Fischerspooner
