= 1973 Cronulla-Sutherland Sharks season =

- NSWRFL rank: 2nd
- 1973 record: Wins: 19; draws: 0; losses: 7
- Points scored: For: 438 (87 tries, 88 goals, 1 field goal); against: 254 (44 tries, 60 goals, 2 field goals)

Team information
- Coach: Tommy Bishop
- Captain: Tommy Bishop Greg Pierce Cliff Watson
- Stadium: Endeavour Field
- Avg. attendance: 8,237

Top scorers
- Tries: Tommy Bishop (9)
- Goals: Steve Rogers (49)
- Points: Steve Rogers (119)
← 1972	1974 →

The 1973 Cronulla-Sutherland Sharks season was the seventh in the club's history. They competed in the New South Wales Rugby Football League's 1973 season.

Three Cronulla players, Ken Maddison, Greg Pierce and Steve Rogers were selected to make their international representative debuts for Australia in 1973.

== Ladder ==
	Team	Pld	W	D	L	PF	PA	PD	Pts
1	Manly	22	17	1	4	500	226	+274	35
2	Cronulla	22	17	0	5	389	219	+170	34
3	St. George	22	15	0	7	372	213	+159	30
4	Newtown Jets	22	14	0	8	358	224	+134	28
5	Canterbury	22	12	1	9	369	269	+100	25
6	Eastern Suburbs	22	12	0	10	415	314	+101	24
7	South Sydney	22	11	1	10	345	367	-22	23
8	North Sydney	22	7	1	14	239	350	-101	15
9	Western Suburbs	22	7	0	15	310	414	-104	14
10	Balmain	22	7	0	15	254	495	-241	14
11	Parramatta	22	6	0	16	275	492	-217	12
12	Penrith	22	5	0	17	272	525	-253	10
