= Ken Arthurson =

Australian rugby league player and coach

Personal information
- Full name: Kenneth Richard Arthurson
- Born: 1 October 1929 (age 97) Glebe, New South Wales, Australia

Playing information
- Position: Halfback
Club
Years	Team	Pld	T	G	FG	P
1950–52	Manly-Warringah	41	14	0	0	42

Coaching information
Club
Years	Team	Gms	W	D	L	W%
1957–61	Manly-Warringah	98	56	2	40	57

Kenneth Richard "Arko" Arthurson AM (born 1 October 1929) is an Australian rugby league football identity. Affectionately known as "The Godfather of Manly", he played, coached and was later an administrator at the Manly-Warringah Sea Eagles club in the New South Wales Rugby League premiership. Later he ran the NSWRL, and then the Australian Rugby League during the 1990s' Super League war, resigning in 1997 as part of the peace process for creating the unified National Rugby League.

== Background ==
Born in the Sydney suburb of Glebe, Ken Arthurson became a rugby league footballer through the Freshwater Surf Club, playing in their 1945 D-Grade premiership win alongside another future Manly-Warringah Sea Eagles legend, and the club's first home-grown Australian international, Roy Bull.

== Playing career ==
Ken Arthurson made his first grade debut in the 1950 NSWRFL season for the three-year-old Manly-Warringah club under the coaching of former Kangaroo tourist and Australian test captain Wally O'Connell, who had moved to Manly from Eastern Suburbs. Arko played at half-back in Manly-Warringah's first Grand Final appearance in the 1951 NSWRFL Grand Final against the South Sydney Rabbitohs at the Sydney Sports Ground. The day didn't go as planned for the Sea Eagles though as Souths ran out easy 42-14 winners. Although Manly were easily defeated by Souths, they gained respect around the league for having reached the Grand Final in just their fifth year in the premiership having joined in 1947 (fellow 1947 entrant Parramatta did not play their first Grand Final until 1976, a 13–10 loss to Manly).

Arthurson, by then regarded as one of the best young halfbacks in the league, then played another full season at Manly in 1952, before accepting the role of player-coach with NSW Country Group 11 team Parkes' for 1953. His reason for leaving Manly and going to Parkes was that with players such as Australian and NSW halfback Keith Holman generally being the first picked for representative teams (City Firsts, NSW and Australia), Arthurson felt he had a better chance at NSW and Australian selection playing for Country Firsts.

Just three weeks into his stint at Parkes in a match between Northern and Southern NSW Zones in April 1953, Ken was badly injured. The 27 April edition of the Parkes Champion Post reported that it 'was early in the game when Ken fell over the goal line and another player, who was following him, fell on top of him, striking ken's head with his knee'. He was rushed to Parkes District Hospital in a serious condition with a fractured skull. Ken had taken part in only two other matches since his arrival. He was later to spend three months in hospital recuperating from his injury and never played Rugby League again.

== Coaching career ==
Arthurson returned to Sydney and coached Manly's third grade team in 1954 and reserve grade in 1955–56. He was first grade coach from 1957 to 1961, making the semi-finals every year and the 1957 Grand Final as a 27-year-old. His side made another Grand Final appearance in 1959. Unfortunately for Arthurson and Manly, both Grand Finals were played against a St George side in the early years of their record run of 11 straight premierships. Arthurson later said that there was no shame to running second to those St George teams whose talent included Ken Kearney, Norm Provan, Eddie Lumsden, Brian "Poppa" Clay, Harry Bath and future rugby league Immortal Johnny Raper.

== Administration ==
Following his coaching stint at Manly, Arthurson became the club's secretary, taking over from Jack Munro after Munro's passing in 1963. Arthurson held this post for 20 years, during which time he helped build the Sea Eagles into one of the most successful clubs in the league by use of his negotiating skills and the club's finances, something which made Manly the team others loved to hate (many believe that Arthurson's only rival as a top club administrator in Australia was his close friend, Canterbury-Bankstown's Peter "Bullfrog" Moore). During his time as club secretary, Arko signed players who went on to become legends not only at Manly but also in rugby league. His list of players includes Graham Eadie, Ken Irvine, Terry Randall, Mal Reilly, John O'Neill, Ray Branighan, Max Krilich, Phil Lowe, Paul Vautin, Les Boyd, Kerry Boustead, and possibly his greatest signing, Australian Rugby League Immortal Bob Fulton.

As told by people such as Paul "Fatty" Vautin, Arko's negotiating skills often led a player to sign or re-sign with Manly for less money than they were being offered by other clubs. In his biography "The Strife and times of Paul Vautin", Fatty told how in the early 1980s Parramatta Eels coach Jack Gibson offered him a substantial amount of money to join the Eels. When he told Arthurson about the offer, Arko convinced him that living on the Northern Beaches and playing for Manly offered him a far better lifestyle than in the western suburbs, including asking Vautin to compare swimming at any of the peninsula's renowned beaches to having to swim in the Parramatta River, telling him "You'll catch Typhoid". Fatty ended up re-signing with Manly for more than his previous contract (on the provision that he used at least half of the money to buy a house in the area...another Arthurson incentive to remain at the club), but far less than what Gibson was offering.

Arthurson's tireless efforts as secretary of Manly-Warringah paid off big time in the 1970s as the Sea Eagles won the NSWRL premiership in 1972, 1973, 1976 and 1978 making the club the most successful of the decade. In total, during his 20 years as club secretary, Manly appeared in 8 Grand Finals for four premierships; 1968, 1970, 1972, 1973, 1976, 1978, 1982 and 1983. The club also won the Minor premiership in 1971, 1972, 1973, 1976 and 1983, the NSWRFL club championship in 1972 and 1973, the pre-season competition in 1980 and the KB Cup in 1982 and 1983. They also reached the finals series in 1966, 1968-1978 and 1981–1983.

In 1984 he became the Chairman of the Australian Rugby League (ARL) and in 1986 took over from Tom Bellew as Chairman of the New South Wales Rugby League (NSWRL). He was made a Member of the Order of Australia in 1988 "in recognition of (his) service to Rugby League football".

In the mid-1990s Arthurson led the ARL's fight against Rupert Murdoch's News Ltd in the Super League war. On 28 February 1997, in order to improve the chances of a peace deal with Super League being reached, Arthurson resigned as ARL chairman. Also in 1997, Arthurson released his book, Arko, My Game.

On 24 October 2000, Arthurson was awarded the Australian Sports Medal for his fourteen years presiding over the NSWRL and ARL.

The Ken Arthurson Stand, located in the south-eastern corner at Brookvale Oval and linking the Jane Try and (now) Lyons-Menzies stands, is named in his honour and was officially opened by Arthurson and the Mayor of Warringah Council Brian Green on Sunday 14 June 1995.

During his time as head of the ARL, Arthurson also served as President of the Manly Leagues Club until retiring in October 2004.

== Honours ==
In November 2009, Arthurson was awarded the 'Spirit of Rugby League Award' by the Rugby League International Federation, in their inaugural awards presentation. He was inducted into the Sport Australia Hall of Fame in 2010.

The Manly Warringah Sea Eagles have also named one of their club awards in his honour. The Sea Eagles' Rookie of the Year award is known as the "Ken Arthurson Award - Rookie of the Year".

== Retirement ==
Ken Arthurson currently lives on the Gold Coast in Queensland where his love of rugby league has seen him attend NRL games involving the Gold Coast Titans and Manly as a guest of the Titans, though he has stated that his heart will always be at Brookvale and he remains a staunch supporter of his beloved Manly-Warringah Sea Eagles.

His second wife Barbara died on 3 August 2022.
