= John Floyd (rugby league) =

Australian rugby league footballer

Personal information
- Full name: JohnFloyd
- Born: 23 September 1950 (age 74); Sydney, New South Wales, Australia

Playing information
- Position: Fullback
Club
Years	Team	Pld	T	G	FG	P
1972–78	Newtown	112	29	0	0	87
1979	South Sydney	1	0	0	0	0
	Total	113	29	0	0	87

John Floyd nicknamed Pink or Pink Floyd is an Australian former rugby league footballer who played in the 1970s for Newtown and South Sydney as a fullback in the NSWRL competition.

== Early life ==
Floyd played his junior rugby league in the South Sydney district before being signed by the South Sydney. Floyd was named the Rugby League Week rookie of the year in 1971 but was cut by Souths before making his first grade debut. Floyd then signed with Newtown for the 1972 season.

== Playing career ==
Floyd made his first grade debut for Newtown in 1972 and scored 9 tries for the club in his first season. In 1973, Newtown announced Jack Gibson as the club's new coach. Gibson guided Newtown to the finals in his first season at the club. Floyd played in all 3 finals games for the team as Newtown made the preliminary final until being defeated by Cronulla-Sutherland. Gibson only spent one season with Newtown and left at the end of 1973. In the following years, Newtown slid back down the ladder and in 1978 and 1979, Floyd was in the sides that finished with back to back wooden spoons.

In 1979, Floyd rejoined his boyhood club Souths but only played 1 game for the club which was against Manly-Warringah. Floyd then retired at the end of 1979.
