= Allan Maddalena =

Australian rugby league player

Playing information
- Position: Fullback, Centre, Wing
Club
Years	Team	Pld	T	G	FG	P
1967–71	Newtown Jets	80	10	0	0	30
1969–70	→ Warrington	1	0	0	0	0
1972–74	Manly Warringah	15	4	0	0	12
	Total	96	14	0	0	42
Representative
Years	Team	Pld	T	G	FG	P
1966	New South Wales	2	1	0	0	3
1966	NSW Country	2	0	0	0	0
1967	NSW City	2	0	0	0	0

Allan Maddalena is an Australian former rugby league player.

== Biography ==
A Wollongong native, Maddalena was educated at Dapto High School and played his early rugby league with the Western Suburbs Red Devils, primarily as a three-quarter.

Maddalena toured New Zealand with NSW Country in 1966 and on his return replaced an injured Keith Barnes at fullback for New South Wales in their interstate series against Queensland. On his state debut, Maddalena scored a try as New South Wales defeated Queensland 16–6 at the Sydney Cricket Ground.

In 1967, Maddalena began playing first-grade for the Newtown Jets.

Maddalena had an overseas stint with Warrington in 1969–70, playing alongside Bob Fulton.

From 1972 to 1974, Maddalena competed for Manly Warringah, which included two premiership-winning seasons.
