= Olaf Prattl =

Australian rugby league footballer

Personal information
- Full name: Olaf Prattl
- Born: 15 September 1950 (age 76) Wyong, New South Wales, Australia

Playing information
- Position: Wing, Centre, Five-eighth, Lock
Club
Years	Team	Pld	T	G	FG	P
1969–71	Balmain	49	9	0	0	27
1972	Western Suburbs	8	2	0	0	6
1973	Cronulla-Sutherland	3	0	0	0	0
1974–75	Bramley
1975	Parramatta	6	2	0	0	6
	Total	66	13	0	0	39
- Source: As of 30 May 2019

Olaf 'Ollie' Prattl (born 15 September 1950) is an Australian former rugby league footballer who played in the 1960s and 1970s. He played for Balmain, Western Suburbs, Cronulla-Sutherland and Parramatta in the New South Wales Rugby League (NSWRL) competition.

== Background ==
Prattl, of Swedish descent, represented Southern Division before being selected for NSW Country Seconds and gaining the attention of Balmain who signed him as an 18 year old in 1968.

== Playing career ==
Prattl made his first grade debut in 1969 for Balmain. Balmain would go on to reach the 1969 NSWRL grand final against South Sydney but Prattl missed the match due a broken leg which occurred in a game against Newtown about a month before the decider. Balmain would go on to win their 11th and final premiership defeating a highly fancied Souths team 11–2 at the Sydney Cricket Ground.

Prattl played with Balmain until the end of 1971 and then signed with Western Suburbs. Prattl only played the one season at Wests before joining Cronulla-Sutherland. Prattl only played 3 games across 2 seasons at Cronulla and did not play in the club's maiden grand final appearance.

Prattl played for English club Bramley during the 1974–75 season.

In 1975, Prattl joined Parramatta and featured in 6 games before departing the club. Prattl then went on to play rugby league in the Illawarra competition.
