= Peter Flanders =

Australian rugby league footballer

Playing information
- Position: Fullback or Winger
Club
Years	Team	Pld	T	G	FG	P
1969–71	Western Suburbs	33	6	69	2	160
1972	Eastern Suburbs	20	8	8	0	40
	Total	53	14	77	2	200

Peter Flanders is an Australian former rugby league footballer. A fullback, he appeared in 33 matches for the Western Suburbs between 1969 and 1971. He subsequently played for the Eastern Suburbs during the 1972 NSWRFL season.
