= Norm Thomas (rugby league) =

Australian rugby league footballer

Personal information
- Full name: Norman Thomas
- Born: 7 January 1948 (age 77)

Playing information
- Position: Prop, Second-row
Club
Years	Team	Pld	T	G	FG	P
1968–75	Canterbury-Bankstown	67	5	0	0	15
1977	Cronulla-Sutherland	3	0	0	0	0
1977	Canterbury-Bankstown	9	0	0	0	0
	Total	79	5	0	0	15
- Source: As of 10 July 2019

Norm Thomas is an Australian former rugby league footballer who played in the 1960s and 1970s. He played for Canterbury-Bankstown and Cronulla-Sutherland in the New South Wales Rugby League (NSWRL) competition.

== Playing career ==
Thomas made his first grade debut for Canterbury against Eastern Suburbs in Round 18 1968 at Belmore Oval. In 1971 and 1972, Thomas won the reserve grade premiership with Canterbury. In 1974, Thomas played 10 games for the club but missed out on selection in the 1974 grand final which Canterbury lost against Eastern Suburbs.

In 1976, Thomas joined Cronulla-Sutherland but spent most of his time there in reserve grade and only managed to make 3 appearances in the top grade over 2 seasons. In the middle of 1977, Thomas asked for a release from Cronulla and joined Canterbury once again. Thomas made 9 further appearances for Canterbury before leaving at the end of 1977. In total, Thomas played 171 games for Canterbury across all grades. He was awarded life membership whilst still an active player with Canterbury. In 1979, Thomas captain-coached the Byron Bay Red Devils and in 1981 led them to the Group 18 premiership.
