= Ray Corcoran =

Australian rugby league footballer

Personal information
- Full name: Raymond Corcoran

Playing information
- Position: Wing
Club
Years	Team	Pld	T	G	FG	P
1968–75	Cronulla-Sutherland	108	63	0	0	189
Representative
Years	Team	Pld	T	G	FG	P
1970	New South Wales	1	1	0	0	3
- Source: As of 27 June 2019

Ray Corcoran is an Australian former rugby league footballer who played in the 1960s and 1970s.

== Playing career ==
He was a member of the Cronulla-Sutherland club for eight seasons between 1968 and 1975. His usual position was on the wing. Corcoran's career total of 63 tries is currently the fifth-highest total for the club, and was the highest when he retired in 1975. He was selected to play for New South Wales on one occasion in 1970.

Corcoran played for Cronulla-Sutherland on the wing in the 1973 NSWRFL season's Premiership Final loss against Manly-Warringah.

== Post playing ==
In 2016, Corcoran was nominated for Cronulla's "Team of the half century" but was overlooked in favour of Valentine Holmes and Mat Rogers.
