= John Bonham (rugby league) =

Australian rugby league footballer

Personal information
- Full name: John Bonham
- Born: 25 September 1948 (age 77) Parkes, New South Wales, Australia

Playing information
- Position: Centre, Five-eighth
Club
Years	Team	Pld	T	G	FG	P
1970–73	Newtown	73	14	195	2	436
Representative
Years	Team	Pld	T	G	FG	P
1976	NSW Country	1	0	0	0	0
- Source: Whiticker/Hudson

John Bonham (born 25 September 1948) is an Australian former rugby league footballer who played in the 1970s.

== Playing career ==
Originally from Parkes, New South Wales as a Halfback, Bonham was signed by the Newtown club in 1969 and he went on to have four successful seasons with the club.

He played centre, five-eighth, halfback and hooker for Newtown during his career and was also a prolific goals kicker. He returned to country rugby league in 1975 and represented N.S.W. Country firsts in 1976.
