= Ken Irvine =

Australia international rugby league footballer

Personal information
- Full name: Kenneth John Irvine
- Born: 5 March 1940 Cremorne, New South Wales, Australia
- Died: 22 December 1990 (aged 50) Brisbane, Queensland, Australia

Playing information
- Height: 5 ft 8 in (173 cm)
- Weight: 12 st 4 lb (78 kg)
- Position: Wing
Club
Years	Team	Pld	T	G	FG	P
1958–70	North Sydney	176	171	59	1	633
1971–73	Manly Sea Eagles	60	41	11	0	145
	Total	236	212	70	1	778
Representative
Years	Team	Pld	T	G	FG	P
1959–67	New South Wales	24	30	4	0	98
1959–68	Australia	31	33	11	0	121
1960–67	City Firsts	8	7	0	0	21
- Relatives: Daniel Irvine (nephew)

Kenneth John Irvine (5 March 1940 – 22 December 1990), also nicknamed "Mongo", was an Australian professional rugby league footballer who played in the 1950s, 1960s and 1970s. For 56 years he held the Australian record for the most tries in a first-grade career, 212, until it was surpassed by Alex Johnston in 2026.

Irvine's was named in 2008 in the list of Australian rugby league's 100 greatest players, as well as being an automatic selection for the Australian Rugby League's "Team of the Century".

Irvine played his club football for the North Sydney and Manly-Warringah clubs in the New South Wales Rugby Football League premiership, winning the premiership with Manly in 1972 and 1973. His great speed saw him play primarily on the Wing.

== Early life ==
Born in Cremorne on Sydney's Lower North Shore, to John Bernard Irvine, a butcher, and his wife Doris May (née McCabe), Irvine attended Marist Brothers Mosman. He originally excelled in both baseball and sprinting, playing in the New South Wales junior baseball side alongside future New South Wales and Australian teammate Reg Gasnier, while also competitively running for the Randwick-Botany Club. After deciding to attend a trial at Wentworth Park for the North Sydney Bears rugby league club as a 17-year-old, their first grade coach Ross McKinnon stated "sign that kid for life", and Ken was signed and playing for the club the following year.

== Playing career ==
=== North Sydney Bears ===
Making his debut for the club on the wing in 1958, he was an instant success for the club, proving to be a frequent try scorer. After only one full club season with Norths, Irvine was selected for New South Wales in 1959. He was the 1959 NSWRFL season's leading try-scorer with 19 and was rewarded with selection in the Australian side for the 1959-60 Kangaroo tour. Irvine made his Australian debut on the tour against France at the Parc des Princes stadium in Paris on 31 October 1959.

In 1961, Irvine showcased his speed at a specially-arranged event specifically in an attempt to break professional world record over 100 yards. Irvine won the event and equalled the record of 9.3 seconds. During the same event he also won the 120-yard Dubbo Gift after starting a yard behind scratch, again displaying his much-publicised speed.

Irvine's speed was such that he is still considered by many to be the fastest player ever to lace on a boot, and is favorably compared against other noted rugby league speedsters such as Johnny Bliss, Michael Cleary (a 1962 Commonwealth Games 100 yards Bronze Medallist who beat Irvine in a A£2,000 match race at Sydney's Wentworth Park in 1964), Martin Offiah and Darren Albert.

In total, Irvine was selected for three Kangaroo Tours. He toured in 1959–60, 1963–64 where he repeated his feat from 1962 of being the only Australian to score a try in each Test of an Ashes series against Great Britain including 3 tries in the 50-12 second Test win at Station Road in Swinton in a game that became known as the "Swinton Massacre", and finally 1967–68. Irvine's feat of scoring a try in each Test of an Ashes series against Great Britain was later equalled by Sam Backo in 1988 and Mal Meninga in 1990.

In 1962, in the third Ashes Test against Great Britain at the Sydney Cricket Ground, referee Darcy Lawler awarded a try to Irvine late in the game, ignoring a forward pass from Bill Carson amid howls of protest from Lions players. Australian captain Arthur Summons then gave him the goal kicking duties, leaving him with a side-line conversion. As he lined the ball up for the kick, Lawler allegedly gave Irvine some advice about how the ball was placed, telling him that he would miss the kick if he did not line the ball correctly (Irvine denied this in his memoirs, though Lawler maintained until his death in 2004 that it was true). Irvine then moved in and re-adjusted the ball, walked back to his mark and kicked the goal. The goal gave Australia a 17–16 win and in doing so saw to it that they avoided losing the series 3–0 to the tourists after the Lions had won the first Test 31–12 in Sydney and the second 17–10 at Lang Park in Brisbane.

Irvine's Test career ended in 1968 when he suffered a broken leg against in the first Test against France on the 1967-68 Kangaroo tour at the Stade Vélodrome in Marseille, ruling him out for much of the 1969 NSWRFL season.

Irvine captained the Bears on occasions, although he threatened to lead his team off in protest at referee Keith Page during a 1970 match against Canterbury at Belmore Sports Ground (Norths won the game 9–8). He went on to make 176 appearances for the side, scoring 171 tries. His stint with the Bears ended at the end of 1970 after disagreements with head coach Roy Francis. Ken Arthurson who was the club secretary at Manly spoke to the media in 2016 and talked about Irvine's defection to The Northern Beaches club saying "I asked Ken if he had given careful thought to the repercussions if he left Norths.” I said. “You’re a legend there and you are sacrificing so much. I won’t be happy unless I know you’ve given it a lot of deep thought and talked it over with your family". Irvine reportedly replied that he had burnt his bridges at Norths and there was no going back.

=== Manly-Warringah Sea Eagles ===
Irvine was quickly signed by Manly club secretary Ken Arthurson in 1971. The Sea Eagles club secretary knew the value of adding the games best winger to what was already a quality team that included the likes of Bob Fulton, Fred Jones, Mal Reilly, Bill Hamilton, Graham Eadie and Terry Randall. Irvine went on to make 60 appearances for the club, scoring 41 tries and showed he had lost none of his speed at the end of his career. He overtook Harold Horder as the NSWRFL's all-time top try-scorer, and was finally able to win a premiership when he helped Manly to claim successive premierships in 1972 (19-14 over Eastern Suburbs) and 1973 (10-7 over Cronulla-Sutherland). Irvine didn't score a try in either of his Grand Final wins with the Sea Eagles.

Irvine retired after the 1973 Grand Final win over Cronulla, becoming the first player to score 200 tries in NSWRFL Premiership history. His record for the total number of tries scored in the NSWRFL or NRL (212) was broken by Alex Johnston on 13 March 2026.

== Records and statistics ==
In 1969, Irvine became the league's leading try scorer when he surpassed Harold Horder's career total of 152. Irvine's 212 career tries was the NSWRL/NRL career record for the most first grade tries, which stood until March 2026 when South Sydney winger Alex Johnston surpassed it in his 244th game.

Irvine's tally was achieved in only 236 first grade games and is 22 tries ahead of Billy Slater 32 ahead of Steve Menzies, and almost 50 ahead of Andrew Ettingshausen, Terry Lamb and Brett Stewart. Menzies, Ettingshausen and Lamb achieved their 160+ totals in 349, 328 and 350 first grade games respectively. Irvine held the record for the highest number of tries scored for a single club, recording 171 tries during 176 games at North Sydney between 1958 and 1970. However, this was surpassed in 2015 by Melbourne Storm's fullback Billy Slater.

Irvine's 33 tries for Australia was eclipsed by Darren Lockyer during the 2010 Four Nations tournament against Papua New Guinea. Lockyer, who started his Test career at Fullback before moving to Five-eighth, broke Irvine's record while playing in his 52nd Test. Irvine scored his 33 tries in 33 Test matches, scoring at the rate of one try per Test.

=== Point scoring summary ===
Games	Tries	Goals	F/G	Points
236	212	70	1	778

=== Career statistics ===
Team	Matches	Tries	Goals	Field Goals	Points	Years
North Sydney	176	171	59	1	633	1958–1970
New South Wales	24	30	4	–	98	1959–1967
Australia	31	33	11	–	121	1959–1967
NSW City	8	7	–	–	21	1960–1967
Manly-Warringah	60	41	11	–	145	1971–1973
Total	299	282	85	1	1,018	1958–1973

== Post-playing ==
Irvine was diagnosed with chronic myeloid leukaemia in 1983. On 22 December 1990, he died of the disease at the age of 50 in Brisbane. North Sydney Oval's Ken Irvine Scoreboard was named in his honour in 1991.

== Accolades ==
Irvine was inducted into the Australian Rugby League Hall of Fame in 2004. In August, 2006 he was named at winger in the North Sydney Bears' Team of the Century.

In 2006 Irvine was named on the wing for the Manly Sea Eagles Dream Team to celebrate the club's 60th anniversary. The team, selected by a panel of selectors which featured former Manly-Warringah administrator Ken Arthurson, respected rugby league writer Ian Heads, the club Chairman Kerry Sibraa and journalist Phil Rothfield, included six of Irvine's teammates from the 1972 and 1973 premiership teams.

In 2007 Irvine was selected by a panel of experts as a winger in an Australian 'Team of the 50s'.

In February 2008, Irvine was named in the list of Australia's 100 Greatest Players (1908–2007) which was commissioned by the NRL and ARL to celebrate the code's centenary year in Australia. Irvine went on to be named as one of the wingers, along with Brian Bevan, in Australian rugby league's Team of the Century. Announced on 17 April 2008, the team is the panel's majority choice for each of the thirteen starting positions and four interchange players. In 2008 New South Wales announced their rugby league team of the century and Irvine was again named on the wing.

Irvine set the world professional sprint record for 100 yards in 1963, running 100 yards (91 m) in 9.3 seconds at Dubbo. He is the only rugby league player to hold a world professional sprint record.

In 2018, the award for the NRL's top try scorer for the season was named the Ken Irvine Medal, with David Fusitu'a from the New Zealand Warriors being the inaugural winner (with 23 tries)
