= Greg Allen (rugby league) =

Australian rugby league footballer

Personal information
- Full name: Gregory Allen
- Born: 27 October 1947 Warren, New South Wales, Australia
- Died: 2009 (aged 61–62)

Playing information
- Position: Prop
Club
| Years | Team | Pld | T | G | FG | P |
|---|---|---|---|---|---|---|
| 1970–76 | Cronulla-Sutherland | 76 | 1 |
- Source: As of 26 March 2018

Greg Allen (born 27 October 1947 – 2009) was an Australian professional rugby league footballer who played in the 1970s for the Cronulla-Sutherland Sharks in the New South Wales Rugby League competition, as a prop.

== Early career ==
Before signing on to the Cronulla-Sutherland club Allen was a strongly built sheep shearer hailing from the country town of Warren in north western New South Wales.

== Career playing statistics ==
=== Point scoring summary ===
| Games | Tries | Goals | F/G | Points |
|---|---|---|---|---|
| 76 | 1 | - | - | 4 |

=== Matches played ===
| Team | Matches | Years |
|---|---|---|
| Cronulla-Sutherland Sharks | 76 | 1970–1976 |
