= Derek Moritz =

Australian rugby league footballer

Personal information
- Full name: Derek Moritz

Playing information
- Position: Wing
Club
Years	Team	Pld	T	G	FG	P
1967–72	Manly Warringah	53	24	74	0	220
1973–74	North Sydney	20	5	30	0	75
	Total	73	29	104	0	295
- Source: Whiticker/Hudson

Derek Moritz is an Australian former rugby league footballer who played in the 1960s and 1970s.

A specialist winger, Derek Moritz was a Manly junior who was graded at Manly-Warringah Sea Eagles in 1967. Moritz played for Manly between 1967 and 1972, and played on the wing in the 1970 Grand Final. He moved to the North Sydney Bears for two seasons between 1973 and 1974 before retiring.
