= Peter Moscatt =

Australian rugby league footballer

Personal information
- Full name: Charles Peter Moscatt
- Born: 16 March 1943 Sydney, New South Wales, Australia
- Died: 23 August 2019 (aged 76) Sydney, New South Wales, Australia

Playing information
- Position: Hooker
Club
Years	Team	Pld	T	G	FG	P
1969–75	Eastern Suburbs	83	7	0	0	21
- Source: As of 27 December 2019

Charles "Peter" Moscatt (1943 - 23 August 2019) was an Australian rugby league footballer of the 1960s and 1970s. He played for Eastern Suburbs in the New South Wales Rugby League competition. Post-football he was an ardent and active local government councillor in the Waverley municipality in Sydney.

== Playing career ==
A Bondi local, Moscatt played his junior rugby league with the Charing Cross club in Waverley before coming through Eastern Suburbs junior ranks. He played a season of Group 8 rugby league with Queanbeyan before a season with Leeds in England in the 1965/66 northern winter.

Moscatt made his first grade debut for Eastern Suburbs in 1969 establishing himself as the club's first choice hooker. In 1972, Eastern Suburbs reached the grand final against Manly-Warringah. Moscatt played at hooker in the game which Easts lost 19–14, to see Manly win their first ever premiership.

In 1974, Moscatt missed the entire season as Eastern Suburbs finished as minor premiers under the arrival of coach Jack Gibson. Easts reached the 1974 NSWRL grand final and won their first premiership in 29 years defeating Canterbury 19–4 at the Sydney Cricket Ground. Moscatt lost his place at hooker that season with Gibson preferring Elwyn Walters who had joined the club from rivals South Sydney. In 1975, Eastern Suburbs went on to claim the minor premiership and reached the NSWRFL grand final and won their second straight premiership defeating St George 38–0. Moscatt played only one first grade game for Easts in that 1975 season.

At the end of 1975, Moscatt departed Eastern Suburbs and returned to Queanbeyan for a final season in the country rugby league competition under his old coach Don Furner.

== Post-football ==
During his playing career Moscatt had been a beach inspector and then worked in Sydney's rag-trade as a men's fashion sales representative. Post-playing he worked as a butcher and a meat wholesaler. In 1970 Moscatt married Margaret Peard, a school teacher and the sister of his Roosters team-mate John Peard.

Moscatt was politically active. He served as President of the Rugby League Players Association in the early 1990s, had a long association with that organisation and was awarded a Life Membership in 2005. In the 1990s he was a Councillor in the Waverley municipality in Sydney, drove for environmental reforms and affordable housing initiatives. He was the Waverley Mayor in 2004 when that council became one of the first in Australia to introduce a smoking ban on its beaches. In memoriam Moscatt was described as "social justice warrior" who "stuck up for workers and battlers".

== Death ==
Moscatt died on 23 August 2019 in Sydney. Having donated his brain to research, post-mortem Moscatt was diagnosed with chronic traumatic encephalopathy by Associate Professor Michael Buckland, head of the RPA neuropathology department and head of the molecular neuropathology program at the Brain and Mind Centre. However Buckland concluded that Moscatt did not die of the CTE and stated that "he suffered few of the other symptoms commonly associated with repeated concussions ...... [and] remained an engaging personality until the end".
