= Norm Pounder =

Australian rugby league footballer

Personal information
- Full name: Norman Pounder
- Born: 25 April 1947 (age 78)

Playing information
- Position: Prop
Club
Years	Team	Pld	T	G	FG	P
1968–74	Manly Sea Eagles	86	5	0	0	15
- Source: As of 3 April 2019

Norm Pounder (born 25 April 1947) is an Australian former rugby league footballer who played in the 1960s and 1970s. He played for Manly-Warringah in the New South Wales Rugby League (NSWRL) competition.

== Playing career ==
Pounder made his first grade debut for Manly in 1968. In the same year, Pounder played in the 1968 NSWRL grand final against South Sydney. Manly were appearing in their 4th grand final but were still in search of their first premiership. Manly had beaten Souths a fortnight earlier to reach the grand final but in the decider Souths defeated Manly 13–9. In 1970, Manly reached the grand final and again the opponents were South Sydney. Pounder had played in Manly's grand final qualifier but missed the decider through injury. Souths would win the grand final defeating Manly 23–12.

In 1971, Pounder was part of the Manly side which won the minor premiership. Pounder played in both of the club's finals games but fell short of a grand final appearance losing to St George. In 1972, Manly again claimed the minor premiership and reached the 1972 NSWRL grand final against Eastern Suburbs. After years of heartache, Manly won their first ever premiership defeating Easts 19-14 but Pounder missed out on playing in the game.

In 1973, Manly claimed a third straight minor premiership and reached the 1973 NSWRL grand final against Cronulla-Sutherland. Manly won their second premiership 10–7 in the final with Pounder again missing out selection in the game. Pounder retired the following season in 1974.

== Post playing ==
Pounder went on to become a committee member of the Golden Eagles Association and the Men of League Northern Beaches.
