= Rick Bourke =

Australian rugby league footballer

Personal information
- Full name: Richard Bourke
- Born: 16 November 1953 Cronulla, New South Wales, Australia
- Died: 15 August 2006 (aged 52) Tugun, Queensland, Australia

Playing information
- Position: Wing
Club
Years	Team	Pld	T	G	FG	P
1973–82	Cronulla-Sutherland	146	38	0	0	114
1983	South Sydney	1	0	0	0	0
	Total	147	38	0	0	114

Richard (Rick) Bourke (16 November 1953 – 15 August 2006) was an Australian rugby league footballer. He played for Cronulla-Sutherland and South Sydney in the New South Wales Rugby League (NSWRL) competition.

== Playing career ==
A local junior from Caringbah, New South Wales, Bourke played 10 seasons for Cronulla at wing and fullback and scored thirty eight tries including their only try in the 10–7 1973 Grand Final loss to a Bob Fulton inspired Manly-Warringah at the Sydney Cricket Ground. He also played on the wing for Cronulla in the drawn Grand Final against Manly in 1978, as well as playing fullback in the replay played just two days later. Manly won the replay 16–0.

He played his final season with South Sydney in 1983.

== Death ==
Rick Bourke died of cancer on 15 August 2006 at the John Flynn Hospital, Tugun, Queensland aged 52.
