= Chris Wellman =

Australian rugby league footballer

Personal information
- Full name: Christopher David Wellman
- Born: 30 June 1950; Sydney, New South Wales, Australia
- Died: 3 May 2015 (aged 64); Cabarita Beach, New South Wales, Australia

Playing information
- Position: Five-eighth
Club
Years	Team	Pld	T	G	FG	P
1969–74	Cronulla-Sutherland	81	17	2	0	70
1972	St Helens	13	1	0	0	3
1975	Western Suburbs	15	5	0	0	15
	Total	109	23	2	0	88
- Source: As of 12 April 2019

Chris Wellman (1950-2015) was an Australian professional rugby league footballer who played in the 1960s and 1970s. He played for Cronulla-Sutherland, St Helens and Western Suburbs in the New South Wales Rugby League (NSWRL) competition.

== Background ==
Wellman was born in Sydney, New South Wales, Australia and grew up in the Cronulla area. He played junior rugby league with Sutherland before he was graded by Cronulla-Sutherland in 1969.

== Playing career ==
Wellman made his first grade debut for Cronulla in 1969. In 1973, Cronulla reached their first ever grand final against Manly-Warringah. Wellman played at five-eighth in the grand final which is often remembered as one of the most brutal grand finals due to the solid defense of both teams. Manly would go on to defeat Cronulla 10–7 in front of 52,044 at the Sydney Cricket Ground. Wellman played with Cronulla up until the end of the 1974 season before departing to Western Suburbs. In total, Wellman played 132 games for Cronulla across all grades.

Wellman played 1 season for Wests in 1975 but the club missed out on the finals finishing 7th.

== Post playing ==
Wellman was named at five-eighth in Cronulla's dream team. Wellman's former teammate Tommy Bishop once said of Wellman "When you looked at the backs….Eric Archer and Rogers in the centres, and Chris Wellman, a brilliant player……he should have gone on the Tour (1973 Kangaroos), he could score a try from nothing too".

== Death ==
Wellman died in his sleep of a suspected heart attack at his home at Cabarita near Tweed Heads on 3 May 2015, 58 days before his 65th birthday.
