= Warren Fisher (rugby league) =

Australian rugby league footballer

Personal information
- Born: Manilla, New South Wales, Australia

Playing information
- Position: Fullback
Club
Years	Team	Pld	T	G	FG	P
1973–78	Cronulla-Sutherland	68	26	1	0	80

Warren Fisher is an Australian former rugby league footballer who played in the 1970s.

== Playing career ==
Fisher was originally from Manilla, New South Wales, and came to Cronulla-Sutherland in 1973. Remembered as a sparkling fullback, Fisher played in the 1973 Grand Final in his debut year. Unfortunately, he left the field during the 1973 grand final due to a broken rib that punctured his lung. He returned the following year to play five more seasons with Cronulla until retiring at the end of the 1978 NSWRFL season.
