= Barry Glasgow =

Australian rugby league player

Personal information
- Full name: Barry Glasgow

Playing information
- Position: Centre, Fullback
Club
Years	Team	Pld	T	G	FG	P
1967–69	Western Suburbs	43	3	33	44	163
1970–73	North Sydney	32	2	61	1	129
	Total	75	5	94	45	292

Barry Glasgow is a former Australian professional rugby league player from the 1960s.

Barry Glasgow played for the Western Suburbs Magpies and North Sydney Bears in the 1960s & 70s. He was notable for his prolific field goal kicking ability.
