= John Maguire (rugby league) =

Australian rugby league footballer and coach

Personal information
- Full name: John Francis Maguire
- Born: 16 September 1944 Sydney, New South Wales, Australia
- Died: 6 July 2022 (aged 77)

Playing information
- Position: Prop, Second-row
Club
Years	Team	Pld	T	G	FG	P
1966	St. George	10	0	0	0	0
1968–75	Cronulla-Sutherland	137	20	0	0	60
1977	Parramatta	5	0	0	0	0
	Total	152	20	0	0	60
- Source: As of 12 April 2019

John Maguire Was an Australian former rugby league footballer who played in the 1960s and 1970s. He played for Cronulla-Sutherland, Parramatta and St George in the New South Wales Rugby League (NSWRL) competition. Subsequent to his career in football he became a teacher and principal.

== Background ==
Maguire grew up in the Cronulla region and played for the Presidents Cup team before he was graded by St George as at the time Cronulla did not have a side competing in the NSWRL competition.

== Playing career ==
Maguire made his first grade debut for St George in 1966. Maguire was not part of the grand final winning team which defeated Balmain to win their 11th straight premiership. In 1968, Maguire signed with Cronulla-Sutherland. In 1973, Cronulla reached their first ever grand final against Manly-Warringah. Maguire played in the grand final which is often remembered as one of the most brutal grand finals due to the solid defense of both teams. Manly would go on to defeat Cronulla 10-7 in front of 52,044 at the Sydney Cricket Ground.

In the following seasons, Cronulla fell back down the ladder after the grand final defeat and Maguire left the club at the end of 1975. In 1976, Maguire became captain-coach of Corrimal who played in the Illawarra competition. In 1977, Maguire signed with Parramatta and mainly played for the reserve grade side. Maguire was part of the Parramatta side which won the reserve grade grand final that year.
