= Greg Fryer =

Australian rugby league footballer

Personal information
- Full name: Gregory Fryer
- Born: 24 March 1949; Sydney, New South Wales, Australia
- Died: 4 January 2015 (aged 65); Ballina, New South Wales, Australia

Playing information
- Position: Second-row, Prop, Lock
Club
Years	Team	Pld	T	G	FG	P
1968–74	Balmain	84	18	2	2	61
- Source: As of 16 May 2019

Greg Fryer is an Australian former rugby league footballer who played in the 1960s and 1970s. He played for Balmain in the New South Wales Rugby League (NSWRL) competition.

== Background ==
Fryer grew up in Balmain and played his junior rugby league for Rozelle Codocks. Fryer was then graded by Balmain and won the reserve grade premiership with the club in 1967.

== Playing career ==
Fryer made his first grade debut for Balmain in 1968 and only made one appearance that season. Fryer won the third grade premiership with Balmain in the same year. In 1969, Fryer made 11 appearances as the club won their 11th and final premiership defeating South Sydney in one of the big grand final upsets. Fryer was selected to play in the grand final as a replacement for Peter Provan but was taken out of the side at the last moment as Provan was declared fit to play.

Fryer played with Balmain up until the end of 1974 and then signed on to be captain-coach with Oberon winning the premiership in his first season there. Fryer then captain-coached Macquarie United for 3 seasons in the Newcastle competition and finally went on to captain-coach Ballina.

== Post playing ==
Fryer worked at the Ballina Seagulls Leagues Club for 30 years as Director and Secretary/Manager of the club. In 2008 he was named Coach of the Ballina Seagulls Team of the Century.
