= Tony Ford (rugby league) =

Australian rugby league footballer

Personal information
- Full name: Anthony Wayne Ford
- Born: 21 September 1946 (age 79) Sydney, New South Wales, Australia

Playing information
- Position: Fullback
Club
Years	Team	Pld	T	G	FG	P
1967–74	Western Suburbs	104	11	317	0	667
- Source: As of 11 July 2019

Tony Ford nicknamed "Boots" is an Australian former rugby league footballer who played in the 1960s and 1970s. He played for the Western Suburbs in the New South Wales Rugby League (NSWRL) competition.

== Background ==
Ford grew up in Homebush and Strathfield before signing with Western Suburbs. Ford played in the Presidents Cup and Jersey Flegg Cup Western Suburbs sides.

== Playing career ==
Ford made his first grade debut for Western Suburbs against Parramatta in 1967 at Cumberland Oval. Ford played with Western Suburbs for eight seasons and finished as the club's top point scorer in 4 of those seasons. Ford's time at Western Suburbs was not very successful with the club finishing last in 1971. In his final season at Wests, the club reached the preliminary final against eventual premiers Eastern Suburbs at the Sydney Cricket Ground but lost the match 25-2.

After leaving Wests, Ford became captain-coach of Tumut and then spent one final year as a player with Wentworthville in the Sydney metropolitan competition.
