= Keith Holman =

Australia international rugby league footballer, coach and referee

Keith Holman MBE

Personal information
- Full name: Keith Victor Holman
- Born: 11 September 1927 (Note: His war record says 1925 but a number of sources say he upped his age to be able to enlist in 1945) Ballarat, Australia
- Died: 11 October 2011 (aged 84) Sydney, New South Wales, Australia

Playing information
- Height: 5 ft 6 in (168 cm)
- Weight: 11 st 7 lb (73 kg)
- Position: Halfback
Club
Years	Team	Pld	T	G	FG	P
1948–61	Western Suburbs	200	70	83	0	376
Representative
Years	Team	Pld	T	G	FG	P
1950–58	New South Wales	25	20	1	0	62
1950–58	Australia	35	14	6	0	54
1951–58	NSW City	8	7	3	0	27

Coaching information
Club
Years	Team	Gms	W	D	L	W%
1954–55	Western Suburbs	36	9	1	26	25
1977	Western Suburbs	22	7	0	15	32
	Total	58	16	1	41	28
- Military career
- Allegiance: Australia
- Branch: Royal Australian Air Force
- Service years: 1944-1946
- Rank: Leading Aircraftsman
- Unit: No. 23 Squadron
- Conflicts: World War II

Keith Victor Holman, MBE (11 September 1927 – 11 October 2011) was an Australian Rugby League footballer, a national and state representative Halfback whose club career was played with Western Suburbs between 1949 and 1961. He has since been named as one of Australia’s finest rugby league players of the 20th century. After retiring as player, Holman was coach of Wests and later became one of the game's top-level referees. He was appointed a Member of the Order of the British Empire (MBE) in 1977.

== Early years and war service ==
Holman was born in Ballarat, Australia, and had an impoverished childhood during the Great Depression. In his earliest years he was raised in a shanty at Yarra Bay in Sydney by a man named Holman who may have been his father. He was taken in by a local family named Schofield who enabled him to be schooled by the De La Salle Brothers at Surry Hills. There he met and befriended Bernie Purcell whom he would later play against and alongside in state and Kangaroo touring sides.

Toward the end of the Second World War Holman joined the RAAF as a Leading Aircraftman. He was a chef with 82 Wing, 23 Squadron and was posted to bases in Ipswich, Queensland and later after the Japanese surrender, at Morakai and Balikpapan in Borneo. The Squadron flew B-24 Liberators in a transport role, flying ex-Prisoners of War and other Australian personnel back to Australia.

== Club career ==
After the war he trialled for a contract with South Sydney but was turned away due to his small stature. An approach to Manly was also unsuccessful so he headed to Dubbo and befriended former Wests Five-eighth Eric Bennett. With Bennett's help, he landed a contract with the Magpies in 1948 and quickly rose through the ranks, playing with the Magpies until 1961.

In thirteen seasons at Wests he never played in a premiership-winning team at club level. He missed Wests’ premiership victory in 1952 because he was selected for that year’s Kangaroo tour. He was captain-coach at Wests for seasons 1954 and 1955.

== Representative career ==
Holman started his representative career with selection for New South Wales in 1950 and continued to represent the Blues until 1958.

Also in 1950, Holman made his test debut for Australia, figuring prominently in Australia's first Ashes conquest in 30 years. He was selected to represent Sydney against France during their 1951 tour of Australasia in a match that ended in a 19-all draw. He made both the 1952 Kangaroo tour (5 Tests and 5 tour matches) and the 1956–57 tour (all 6 Tests plus 11 tour matches). Holman was the Australian selectors preferred halfback choice and regular in Test sides and World Cup squads from 1950 to 1958. By the end of his representative career he had amassed the then record of 32 Tests and a then record of 14 Anglo-Australian international appearances, beating Clive Churchill and Sandy Pearce. He made 12 Test appearances against France and 6 appearances against New Zealand. He was named New South Wales Player of the Year three times — 1951, 1956 and 1958.

== Referee and coach ==
When his playing days were over Holman turned to refereeing. In a 1971 game between Queensland and New South Wales, Holman sent off three players. Holman controlled the 1971 Grand Final and went on to referee the Tests of New Zealand's tour of Australia in 1972. He was a consistent first grade referee in 155 games from 1965 up to 1974.

He coached Port Kembla in 1975 and 1976 and then had a final year active year in rugby league in 1977 when he coached his beloved Wests to victory in the 1977 Amco Cup, although the team underwent extreme criticism at the time for inept performances in the premiership competition. In their last three premiership games whilst winning the AMCO Cup, Wests would score only 14 points and concede 136, whilst their seven wins was a five-win decline on the average of their three preceding seasons under Don Parish. Holman announced he was retiring on the final Saturday, when the Magpies would be annihilated 4–49 by eventual premier St. George.

== Accolades ==
He was made a life member of Western Suburbs while still playing.

Keith Holman was awarded Life Membership of the New South Wales Rugby League in 1983.

He was later selected in the Wests Tigers Team of the Century and the Western Suburbs Magpies Team of the Century. In 2003 he was admitted into the Australian Rugby League Hall of Fame.

In 2007 Holman was selected by a panel of experts at halfback in an Australian 'Team of the 50s'.

In February 2008, Holman was named in the list of Australia's 100 Greatest Players (1908–2007) which was commissioned by the NRL and ARL to celebrate the code's centenary year in Australia. Also in 2008 the Western Suburbs Magpies celebrated their centenary by inducting six inaugural members into the club's Hall of Fame. These six included Holman.
