= Ray Branighan =

Australia international rugby league footballer

Personal information
- Born: 5 December 1947 (age 78) Sydney, Australia

Playing information
- Position: Centre, Wing, Fullback
Club
Years	Team	Pld	T	G	FG	P
1968–71	South Sydney	57	26	31	0	140
1972–78	Manly-Warringah	114	30	52	0	194
	Total	171	56	83	0	334
Representative
Years	Team	Pld	T	G	FG	P
1970–75	City Firsts	4	0	6	0	12
1970–74	New South Wales	7	0	5	0	10
1970–75	Australia	17	4	10	0	32
- Relatives: Arthur Branighan (brother); Luke Branighan (nephew)

Ray Branighan (born 5 December 1947) is an Australian former professional rugby league footballer, a star wing and Centre of the 1970s for the South Sydney Rabbitohs, the Manly-Warringah Sea Eagles, as well as New South Wales state and Australian national representative sides.

== Background ==
Ray Branighan was born in Sydney, Australia.

== Souths club career ==
Branighan played 57 games with South Sydney between 1968 and 1971. He played in 1970 and 1971 victorious Rabbitohs Grand Finals scoring tries in both.

In 2004, he was named by Souths in their South Sydney Dream Team, consisting of 17 players and a coach representing the club from 1908 through to 2004.

== Manly club career ==
He was one of a number of 1971 Rabbitohs poached by wealthier clubs in 1972, and along with teammate John O'Neill he moved to Manly. He played 114 games for Manly between 1972 and 1978. He played in the victorious 1972 and 1973 Grand Finals for Manly (partnering Bob Fulton in the centres in both and kicking 6 goals from 7 attempts in the 19 –-14 win over Easts in 1972). Branighan was a reserve back for Manly in their 16–0 win over Cronulla in the 1978 Grand Final replay (Manly had also defeated Cronulla 10 –- 7 in 1973).

== Representative career ==
Branighan represented for Australia in eight Test and nine World Cup matches and appeared five times for New South Wales.

Ray played alongside his brother Arthur Branighan for South Sydney from 1968 to 1970, and his nephew Luke Branighan played with the St George Dragons in 2004.
