= Fred Jones (rugby league) =

Australian rugby league footballer (1941–2021)

Personal information
- Full name: Frederick Jones
- Born: 12 September 1941 Sydney, New South Wales, Australia
- Died: 20 March 2021 (aged 79)

Playing information
- Position: Hooker
Club
Years	Team	Pld	T	G	FG	P
1961–75	Manly Warringah	241	25	0	1	77
Representative
Years	Team	Pld	T	G	FG	P
1968	NSW City	1	0	0	0	0
1968–73	New South Wales	4	2	0	0	6
1968–72	Australia	3	1	0	0	3

Frederick Jones (12 September 1941 – 20 March 2021) was an Australian rugby league footballer who played in the 1960s and 1970s. An Australian international and New South Wales interstate representative hooker, he played his club football for Manly-Warringah, with whom he won the 1972 and 1973 NSWRFL Premierships.

== Playing career ==
A product of the South Coast, Jones rose through the Manly juniors, appearing in the New South Wales Rugby Football League premiership's first grade in 1961.

Except for the 1964 season that he spent at Tumbarumba, Jones played his entire career with the Manly-Warringah club, fourteen seasons in all, and also captained the club. A hooker, he first gained representative honors in 1968, playing for New South Wales and then Australia in the World Cup, He played at 2nd row forward in the 1968 Rugby League World Cup final for Australia in their victory over France in Sydney and ended the year with Manly's 1968 NSWRFL season's grand final loss to Souths.

In 1970, Jones suffered another grand final defeat before captaining the club to their first premiership title. He was a try scorer in the club's 19–14 grand final win over Easts in 1972 and was named in Australia's World Cup squad that went to France at the end of the year, being selected as a reserve for the 1972 Rugby League World Cup final draw with Great Britain in Lyon.

After a four-year absence, Jones played in all three interstate matches in 1973 and finished a memorable year by leading Manly to victory over Cronulla in the grand final. His final season with Manly was in 1975. He retired with the club's all-time record for most first-grade games.
