= Bob Wear =

English rugby league footballer

Personal information
- Full name: Robert Wear

Playing information
- Position: Centre, Wing
Club
Years	Team	Pld	T	G	FG	P
1970–74	Cronulla-Sutherland	103	29	0	0	87
Representative
Years	Team	Pld	T	G	FG	P
1965	Great Britain U24	1	0	0	0	0

Robert Wear is an English former professional rugby league footballer who played for Cronulla in the New South Wales Rugby Football League (NSWRFL).

== Playing career ==
Wear, an Englishman, played as a centre and winger during his career. He was in his late 20s by the time he debuted at Cronulla in 1970, having played in England for several seasons, which was mostly with Barrow but also included a stint at Warrington.

From 1970 to 1974, Wear played 103 first-grade games with Cronulla in the NSWRFL and scored a total of 29 tries, which included a hat-trick against Parramatta at Endeavour Field in 1973. He was on the wing for Cronulla in the club's 1973 grand final loss to Manly.
