= Bill Hamilton (rugby league) =

Australian RL coach and former Australia international rugby league footballer

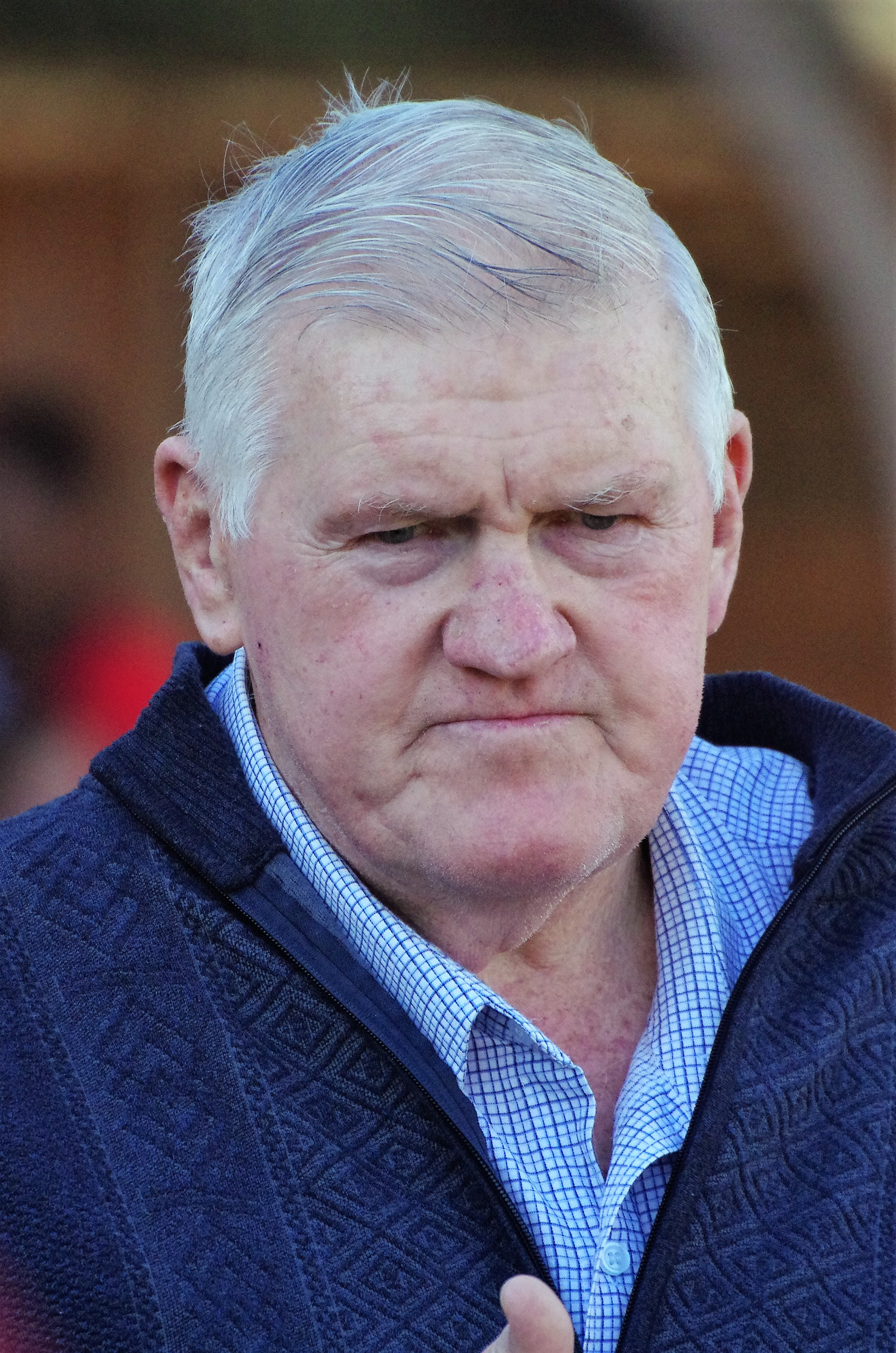

Personal information
- Full name: William John Hamilton
- Born: 12 February 1945 (age 81) Kurri Kurri, New South Wales, Australia

Playing information
- Position: Prop
Club
Years	Team	Pld	T	G	FG	P
19??–??	Kurri Kurri
1965–74	Manly-Warringah	187	19	0	0	57
1975–78	North Sydney	71	6	0	0	18
	Total	258	25	0	0	75
Representative
Years	Team	Pld	T	G	FG	P
1971–73	New South Wales	4	1	0	0	3
1973	Australia	0	0	0	0	0

Coaching information
Club
Years	Team	Gms	W	D	L	W%
1977–78	North Sydney	44	14	2	28	32

Bill "Herman" Hamilton (born 12 February 1945) is an Australian former rugby league footballer who played in the 1960s and 1970s. Known as Herman by teammates after his resemblance to popular television character Herman Munster, he played in the New South Wales Rugby Football League premiership as a front rower for the Manly-Warringah and North Sydney clubs, winning the 1972 and 1973 premierships with the Sea Eagles. He also gained selection for the Australia on the 1973 Kangaroo Tour though he only played in eight minor matches and didn't play a test.

Unwanted by Manly at the end of 1974, he went on to captain the North Sydney Bears, bringing much needed discipline to a club regarded as 'easybeats'. Hamilton captain-coached the club to their last major trophy the Channel 10 Challenge Cup in 1978.

In 2010 he was named at prop forward in Kurri Rugby League Club's team of the century.

A retired policeman, Bill Hamilton lives in Tea Gardens on the NSW Mid North Coast where he has given a lot of his time to the Men of League Foundation.
