= Mick Dryden =

Australian rugby league footballer

Personal information
- Full name: Michael John Dryden

Playing information
- Position: Second-row
Club
Years	Team	Pld	T	G	FG	P
1970–71	St. George	4	0	0	0	0
1972	Balmain Tigers	1	0	0	0	0
	Total	5	0	0	0	0
- Source: Whitticker/Hudson

Michael Dryden is an Australian former professional rugby league footballer who played in the 1970s.

Mick Dryden was a lanky lower grade forward with the St George Dragons during the Jack Gibson era. He featured in two seasons at Saints between 1970 and 1971, and came on as a replacement player for an injured Peter Fitzgerald in the 1971 Grand Final.

During his two seasons at St. George Dragons, Dryden played a total of 49 games for the club: 8 Third Grade, 37 Reserve Grade and 4 First grade games.

He then joined the Balmain Tigers for one season in 1972, mainly playing in the lower grades before retiring.
