= Bob Clapham =

Australian rugby league footballer

Personal information
- Full name: Robert Clapham
- Born: 1948
- Died: c.2004

Playing information
- Position: Centre
Club
Years	Team	Pld	T	G	FG	P
1970–73	St George Dragons	19	5	0	0	15
- Source: Whiticker/Hudson

Robert 'Bob' Clapham is an Australian former rugby league footballer who played in the 1970s.

Bob Clapham was a centre for the St George Dragons during the 1970s. He was a St George junior at the Renown United club and went on to play President's Cup with St. George in 1968 with Ted Walton. Usually a lower grade player, Bob Clapham played four seasons at Saints between 1970 and 1973, which included 19 first grade games. He also played in the 1971 Grand Final.

After finishing up with St George at the end of 1973 he moved to Brisbane where he played a number of seasons for Wynnum Manly Seagulls.
