= Russell Cox (rugby league) =

Australian rugby league footballer

Personal information
- Full name: Russell John Cox
- Born: 1951

Playing information
- Height: 5 ft 8 in (173 cm)
- Weight: 14 st 3 lb (199 lb; 90 kg)
- Position: Hooker, Prop
Club
Years	Team	Pld	T	G	FG	P
1968–77	St. George	62	6	0	0	18
Representative
Years	Team	Pld	T	G	FG	P
1978	NSW Country	1	0	0	0	0

Russell Cox is an Australian former rugby league footballer who played in the 1960s and 1970s.

== Career ==
Cox was graded with St. George in 1968 from the Renown United junior rugby league club.

After playing in the Third Grade grand final in 1971, he was retained as a reserve for the first grade 1971 Grand Final, in which he replaced an injured Grahame Bowen during the second half. Russell Cox was a nuggety Hooker/Front Row forward, who played 62 first grade games with Saints, in which he was also included as a non playing reserve in the 1975 Grand Final. Cox was reserve in both the 1977 grand final and the replay against Parramatta.

He left Sydney football at the end of the 1977 season to join Waratah-Mayfield in the Newcastle competition as captain/coach, and from that club he represented N.S.W. Country Firsts in 1978. He is the brother of the former St. George and Newtown player, Barry Cox.
