= Barry Cox =

Barry Cox may refer to:

- Barry Cox (rugby league)
- Barry Cox (singer)
