= Joe McGraw =

Australian sports administrator

Joe McGraw was a foundation member of the St. George District Rugby League Football Club. 1921

Joseph William McGraw (1874–1951) was a co-founder of the St. George Dragons rugby league club and an Australian sports administrator from the 1920s.

== Biography ==
Joe McGraw is remembered as a foundation member of the St. George Dragons District Rugby League Football Club, and was directly responsible with Allan Clark for the club's admission into the NSWRFL competition in 1921. He was their first club secretary, although he retained that role for only 12 months, until he was replaced by Reg Fusedale after a boardroom spill. He continued retaining a keen interest in the club, and ran for many positions with the St. George club and the NSWRFL over many years. McGraw was also a patron of the St. George Dragons Referees' and was a prominent figure within the St. George area junior league in the early days.

Joe McGraw juggled his football commitments with a successful book-binding business. He resided in Ramsgate, New South Wales for most of his life. He retired from all duties at the St.George club in 1946.

Joe McGraw was awarded life membership of the St. George Dragons club in 1938. He died on 6 November 1951, age of 76.
