= Colin Rasmussen =

Australian rugby league footballer and coach

Col Rasmussen
Personal information
- Full name: Colin Edward Rasmussen
- Born: 7 January 1947; Sydney, New South Wales, Australia
- Died: 13 March 1997 (aged 50); Sutherland, New South Wales, Australia

Playing information
- Position: Hooker
Club
Years	Team	Pld	T	G	FG	P
1967–74	St George Dragons	100	3	0	0	9

Coaching information
Representative
Years	Team	Gms	W	D	L	W%
1993–94	Canada	0	0	0	0
- Source: Whiticker/Hudson

Colin 'Col' Rasmussen (1947−1997) was an Australian rugby league footballer who played in the 1960s and 1970s.

Col Rasmussen came through the Sutherland-Shire juniors to be graded with the St George Dragons in 1967. Rasmussen was a tall Hooker, who played seven seasons with Saints between 1967 and 1974. He got his chance as a first grade regular, replacing Norm Henderson in 1970.

Col Rasmussen's position in the team was finally taken by the up-and-coming junior, Steve Edge. Col Rasmussen is remembered as the hooker who played against George Piggins in the 1971 Grand Final. Rasmussen played 100 first grade games during his career at St. George Dragons. He died on 13 March 1997, age 50.
