= Bob Grant (rugby league) =

Australia international rugby league footballer

Personal information
- Full name: Robert Grant
- Born: 5 June 1946 (age 79)

Playing information
- Position: Halfback
Club
Years	Team	Pld	T	G	FG	P
1965	Balmain Tigers	5	0	0	0	0
1966–75	South Sydney	136	20	0	4	68
	Total	141	20	0	4	68
Representative
Years	Team	Pld	T	G	FG	P
1971	New South Wales	1	1	0	0	3
1970–72	Australia	2	0	0	0	0

Bob Grant (born 5 June 1946) is an Australian former rugby league footballer who played in the 1960s and 1970s. A New South Wales interstate and Australian international representative halfback, he played most of his club football for the South Sydney Rabbitohs, with whom he won three premierships.

== Club career ==
He featured in the talented South Sydney sides of the late 1960s and early 1970s. He played in the premiership victories of 1968, 1970 and 1971. Grant starred with two tries in Souths' convincing 23–12 victory over Manly in the 1970 Grand Final.

In all he played 135 club games for South Sydney between 1966 and 1975.

Grant was voted Rugby League Week Player of the Year for his performances during the 1971 premiership season. In 2004 he was named by Souths in their South Sydney Dream Team, consisting of 17 players and a coach representing the club from 1908 through to 2004.

== Representative career ==
Grant made two Test appearances for the Australian national representative side in 1970 and 1971 and represented in one game for New South Wales. From 1964 to 1969 St. George's Billy Smith held a virtual monopoly on the Australian representative half-back spot, then from 1970 Tommy Raudonikis began to emerge. Undoubtedly Bob Grant's representative opportunities suffered due to these fine players being his peers.

== Sources ==
- Andrews, Malcolm (2006) The ABC of Rugby League, Austn Broadcasting Corpn, Sydney
- Whiticker, Alan & Hudson, Glen (2006) The Encyclopedia of Rugby League Players, Gavin Allen Publishing, Sydney
