= Ken McKenzie (rugby league) =

Australian rugby league footballer and administrator

Personal information
- Full name: Kenneth John McKenzie
- Born: 9 June 1926 Lawson, New South Wales, Australia
- Died: 10 May 1998 (aged 71) Sutherland, New South Wales, Australia

Playing information
- Position: Five-eighth
Club
Years	Team	Pld	T	G	FG	P
1948–52	St. George	16	7	8	0	37

Kenneth John McKenzie (1926–1998) was an Australian rugby league footballer who played in the 1940s and 1950s. McKenzie was later an Administrator at the St. George Dragons.

== Playing career ==
McKenzie joined St. George soon after his discharge from the Australian Army in 1946. He went on to play 95 games for Saints in all grades, was captain of Reserve Grade for many years and actually captained the First Grade team on 25 April 1952 in a game against Parramatta. He retired from football in 1952 after suffering recurring knee cartilage problems.

== Administrative career ==
Upon retirement from playing, Ken McKenzie (who had a background in accountancy) became the club's Auditor and well as being selected on the club Committee. In February 1955, McKenzie was elected the sixth Hon. Secretary of St. George replacing Baden Wales. He held this position of Secretary until May 1956 when he resigned his position due to his private accountancy business transferring to Wellington, New South Wales. He was replaced as Secretary of St. George by Frank Facer, who went on to stay Secretary until his death in 1978.

== Death ==
McKenzie died on 10 May 1998, 30 days before his 72nd birthday.
