= Baden Wales =

Australian rugby league admin (1900–1968)

Baden Powell Wales
- Born: Frederick Charles Sunderland Baden Powell Wales; 17 May 1900; Brewarrina, New South Wales
- Died: 18 April 1968 (aged 67); Brighton-Le-Sands, New South Wales
- Occupation: Rugby league administrator

Baden Powell Wales (1900–1968) was an Australian rugby league administrator with the St. George District Rugby League Football Club during its foundation years until his death.

== Birth ==
Born Frederick Charles Sunderland Baden Powell Wales on 17 May 1900 in Brewarrina, New South Wales, Baden Wales was a major contributor to the St. George Rugby League club during his lifetime.

== Career ==
Baden Wales had a service record in Rugby League going back well before St. George were born beginning in 1921. He was a player, a Referee and an Administrator. Wales worked for rugby league for 46 years, beginning as a player - and club secretary - with Arncliffe Waratahs in 1916. He was prominent in the St George Junior League serving as secretary from 1921 to 1927 and President from 1929 to 1931. He was a foundation committee member at St George Rugby League in 1921, a first grade NSWRFL referee from 1927 to 1933 and was elected president of the NSWRFL Referee's Association in 1931.

He became St. George treasurer in 1939 and succeeded Arthur Justice as the fifth club secretary in 1947 holding that position until 1955 until he was replaced briefly by Ken McKenzie. In 1952, he was a foundation member (and secretary) of the St. George Leagues Club. He later became Chairman of the club. In 1955 he was elected a vice president of the NSWRFL, and then deputy chairman. He also spent 21 years as the general secretary of the St. George Cricket Association.

A later director of St. George, Horrie Maher wrote of Baden Wales: "He was one of the district's greatest sporting administrators. St. George Leagues Club will always stand as a monument to his foresight and business acumen".

== Accolades ==
Baden Wales was awarded Life membership of St George Junior league in 1928. Georges River St George District Cricket Association in 1930. St. George in 1954. Wales was also awarded Life Membership of the NSWRFL on 7 December 1954.

== Death ==
Baden Wales died on 18 April 1968, age 67 at Brighton-Le-Sands, New South Wales.
