= Grahame Bowen =

Australian rugby league footballer

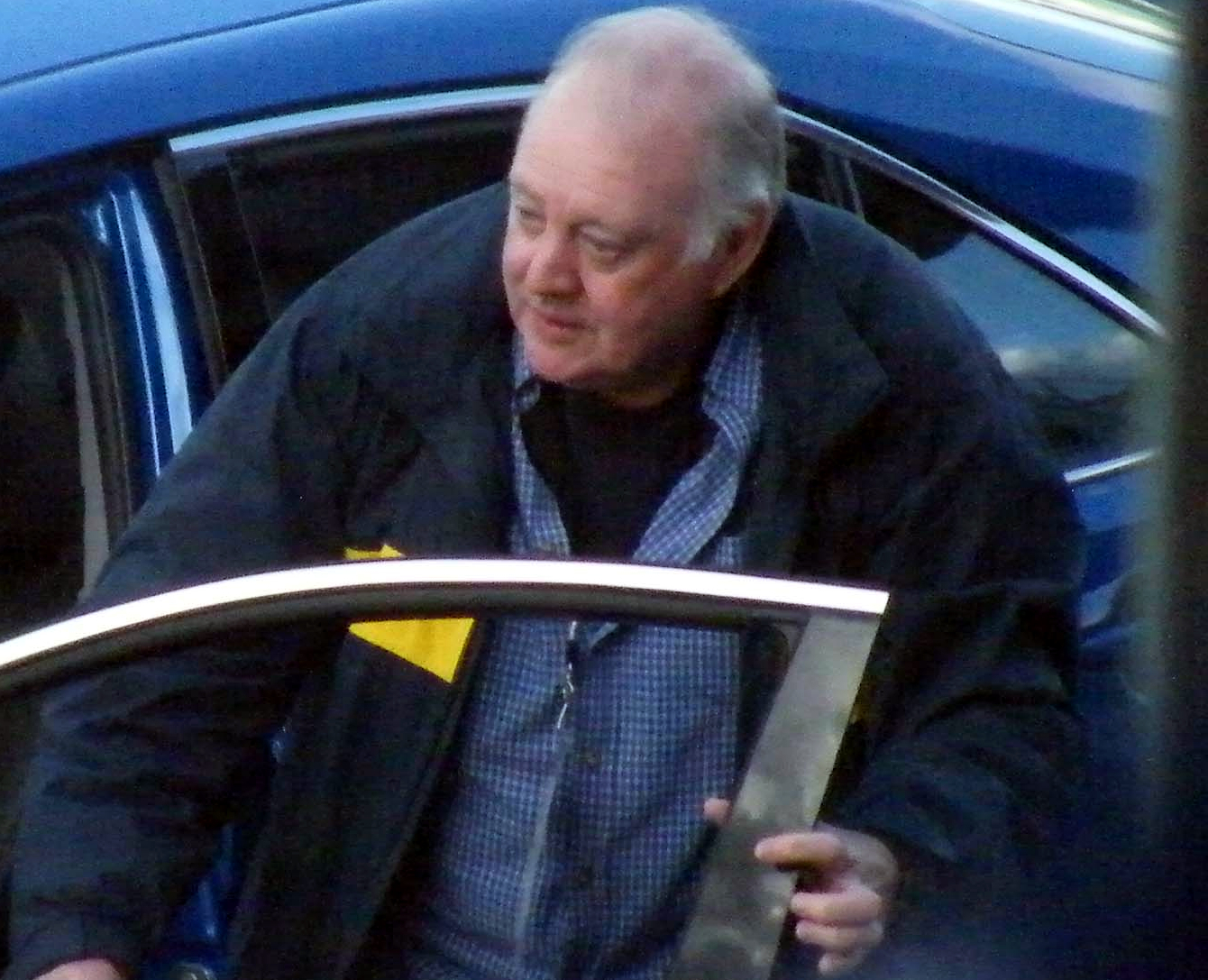

Personal information
- Full name: Grahame Peter Bowen
- Born: 7 September 1946; Townsville, Queensland, Australia
- Died: 29 March 2016 (aged 69); Sydney, New South Wales, Australia

Playing information
- Position: Prop, Second-row
Club
Years	Team	Pld	T	G	FG	P
1967–72	St George Dragons	75	13	0	0	39
1973–74	Cronulla Sharks	29	5	0	0	15
	Total	104	18	0	0	54
- Source: Whiticker/Hudson

Grahame Bowen (7 September 1946 – 29 March 2016) was an Australian rugby league footballer who played in the 1960s and 1970s.

== Career ==
A Cronulla-Sutherland junior player, Grahame Bowen was graded at St George Dragons in 1967 and went on to play six seasons for Saints between 1967-1972 and played 75 first grade games. Bowen played prop-forward in the 1971 Grand Final side that were defeated by South Sydney Rabbitohs. He then moved to Cronulla-Sutherland Sharks in 1973, and starred in the Sharks team that were defeated in the 1973 Grand Final. Bowen played one more year for the Sharks before retiring in 1974.

Grahame Bowen was one of the former St George Dragons players that attended the Reg Gasnier tribute ceremony at Kogarah Oval on 5 July 2014. Bowen died on 29 March 2016.
