= Allan Clark (rugby league) =

Australian rugby league administrator

Allan Percival Clark (1881–1935) was a pioneer Rugby League administrator with the St. George Dragons and is remembered with Joe McGraw as the men behind the big push to have the St. George Club admitted into the NSWRFL in 1921.

== Career ==
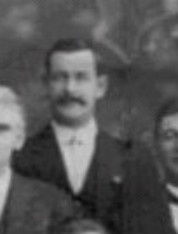
Mr. Allan Clark. Co-founder of the St.George District Rugby League Football Club 1921

Allan Clark was born in Auckland, New Zealand in 1881, and first came to the St. George District in 1893. Being a bachelor he was able to devote the whole of his spare time in placing his services in an honorary capacity at the disposal of all kindred bodies and public activities in the St George District for many years. He held important executive positions, and conscientiously gave of his knowledge and experience spontaneously. He is remembered as one of the stalwarts in the early days of the St. George District Rugby League Club, and fought strenuously for the recognition of St George as a first grade district club. He was the first St. George delegate to the NSWRFL.

Prior to this he held various positions in connection with the Rugby League code, notably he being responsible for the introduction of a St. George Third Grade team into the Sydney competition in 1910 and he was Secretary of the club.

He was also a pioneer director of the St. George Sailing Club.

Allan Clark lived in the St George District for 42 years, and was living in Wilson Street Kogarah, New South Wales in 1935 although he died at Leeton, New South Wales whilst visiting his brother.

== Death ==
Allan Clark died on 11 August 1935, age 54. He was buried at Rookwood Cemetery on 13 August 1935 and the funeral was widely attended
