= Barry Cox (rugby league) =

Australian rugby league footballer

Personal information
- Full name: Barry Cox
- Born: 1 May 1949 (age 77) Sydney, New South Wales, Australia

Playing information
- Position: Fullback
Club
| Years | Team | Pld | T | G | FG | P |
|---|---|---|---|---|---|---|
| 1971–72 | St George Dragons | 3 | 1 | 0 | 0 | 3 |
| 1973–76 | Newtown Jets | 43 | 7 | 0 | 0 | 21 |
| | Total | 46 | 8 | 0 | 0 | 24 |

Barry Cox is an Australian former rugby league footballer who played in the 1970s.

Barry Cox was graded with St George Dragons, along with his brother Russell Cox from the Renown United juniors. Cox played two seasons at St. George before moving to Newtown for four seasons and gave great service to the Jets. He retired from first grade football in 1977.
