= Frank Facer =

- Frank Facer 1949

Personal information
- Full name: Francis Henry Facer
- Born: 8 August 1919 Naremburn, New South Wales, Australia
- Died: 16 January 1978 (aged 58) Camperdown, New South Wales, Australia

Playing information
- Position: Hooker
Club
Years	Team	Pld	T	G	FG	P
1940–46	North Sydney	76	2	0	0	6
1947–50	St George	74	2	0	0	6
	Total	150	4	0	0	12
Representative
Years	Team	Pld	T	G	FG	P
1945	NSW City Firsts	1	0	0	0	0
- Source: Whiticker/Hudson

Francis Henry Facer (8 August 1919 – 16 January 1978) was an Australian rugby league footballer who played in the 1940s and 1950s at North Sydney and St George. After he retired from playing, he became a noted sports administrator at St George from 1956 until 1978. There he was instrumental in finding and bringing to the club many future stars and played a pivotal role in building a club structure that supported a sustained record of success.

== Playing career ==
North Sydney

Born and bred in Naremburn, New South Wales to parents Albert and Violet Facer, Frank Facer became a first grade rugby league player in Sydney. Facer was graded at Norths in 1938, and went on to play over 130 games in all graded for Norths. He was a hooker in the North Sydney 1943 Grand Final loss to Newtown although he had been restricted in the game due to a leg injury. Facer played seven seasons in first grade with North Sydney between 1940 and 1946, the last four of which he played at hooker.

St. George Dragons

Dragons stalwart, 'Snowy' Justice had enticed Facer to join the St George Dragons in 1947 and he played four seasons with the Saints between 1947 and 1950. His only representative appearance was in 1945, when he played for City against Country NSW. Facer retired a year after winning the 1949 Premiership with St George Dragons but it was in club administration that he became famous.

== Administrative career ==
Initially a club selector in 1951, he was made Hon. Club Secretary (replacing Ken McKenzie) and NSWRFL delegate in 1956. In December 1964 he quit his job on the railways to take up a full-time position as secretary-treasurer, the second person to become a full-time official in the game after Manly-Warringah's Ken Arthurson. Facer and his staff nurtured the young talent at St George while scouting locally and internationally for talented players to keep the club competitive. The St George Dragons won twelve premierships under his management—eleven from 1956 to 1966 and another in 1977. Facer was responsible for bringing many famous players to, and keeping them at the club, and his recruitment was seen as a key factor in the club's success. He was a highly regarded sports administrator who built a supportive environment in the club for the players and their families; demonstrated regard for the players financial welfare and who was a skillful negotiator and a balanced disciplinarian. He was a member of the NSWRFL board for many years, and was awarded Life Membership of the St. George Dragons Club in 1964.

== Death ==
Frank Facer fought cancer for a number of years before his death. In the middle of the 1970s he lost a leg to the disease, but battled on until his health declined by late 1977, although he did live to see his beloved St. George Dragons win the 1977 Premiership.

Facer died at the Gloucester House at Royal Prince Alfred Hospital in Camperdown on 16 January 1978. It was a sad day for the St George club with many people turning up for his funeral at Woronora Crematorium, Sutherland on 18 January 1978. His wake was held at St George Leagues Club, where press reports of the time stated that over 2000 attended.
