= 1971 NSWRFL season =

Rugby league competition

1971 New South Wales Rugby Football League
- Teams: 12
- Premiers: South Sydney (20th title)
- Minor premiers: Manly-Warringah (1st title)
- Matches played: 136
- Points scored: 4477
- Attendance: 1562338
- Top points scorer(s): Graeme Langlands (196)
- Wooden spoon: Western Suburbs (11th spoon)
- Rothmans Medal: Denis Pittard
- Top try-scorer(s): Paul Cross (18)

The 1971 New South Wales Rugby Football League premiership was the sixty-fourth season of Sydney's professional rugby league football competition, Australia's first. Twelve teams, including six foundation clubs and another six admitted since 1908, competed for the J. J. Giltinan Shield during the season, which culminated in a Grand Final match for the W.D. & H.O. Wills between the South Sydney and St. George clubs.

== Season summary ==
The season saw the number of tackles in a set increased from four to six. In addition, the number of points awarded for a field goal was reduced from two to one.

Each side met all others twice in twenty-two regular season rounds, resulting in the top four teams consisting of Manly-Warringah, South Sydney, St. George and Parramatta who fought out three finals for the right to play in the Grand Final.

The 1971 Rothmans Medal was won by South Sydney's five-eighth Denis Pittard while Rugby League Week awarded their player of the year award to South Sydney's halfback Bob Grant.

This season marked the end of a 23-year run where all but two of the premierships were won by St. George or South Sydney. (Note: The only exceptions were Western Suburbs winning in 1952 and Balmain winning in 1969.)

The 1971 season saw a ban imposed by the NSWRL on TV coverage of games in the Sydney premiership. It was believed that TV coverage was a contributing factor to falling attendances at games. As a result, only the Grand Final was televised, and even then as a one-hour late night highlights package rather than live coverage. The ban was lifted for the 1972 season onwards, as in practice it was shown to have negligible effect on match attendances.

In the sixteenth round, a “double-header” — Balmain played St. George at 1 P.M. and Parramatta played South Sydney at 2:30 P.M. — was held for the first time at the Sydney Cricket Ground, although it did not meet expectation. The “double header” was decided upon after it was feared that protests against the apartheid South Africa rugby union tourists, who were scheduled to play in Sydney that Saturday, would affect attendances at League games.

=== Teams ===
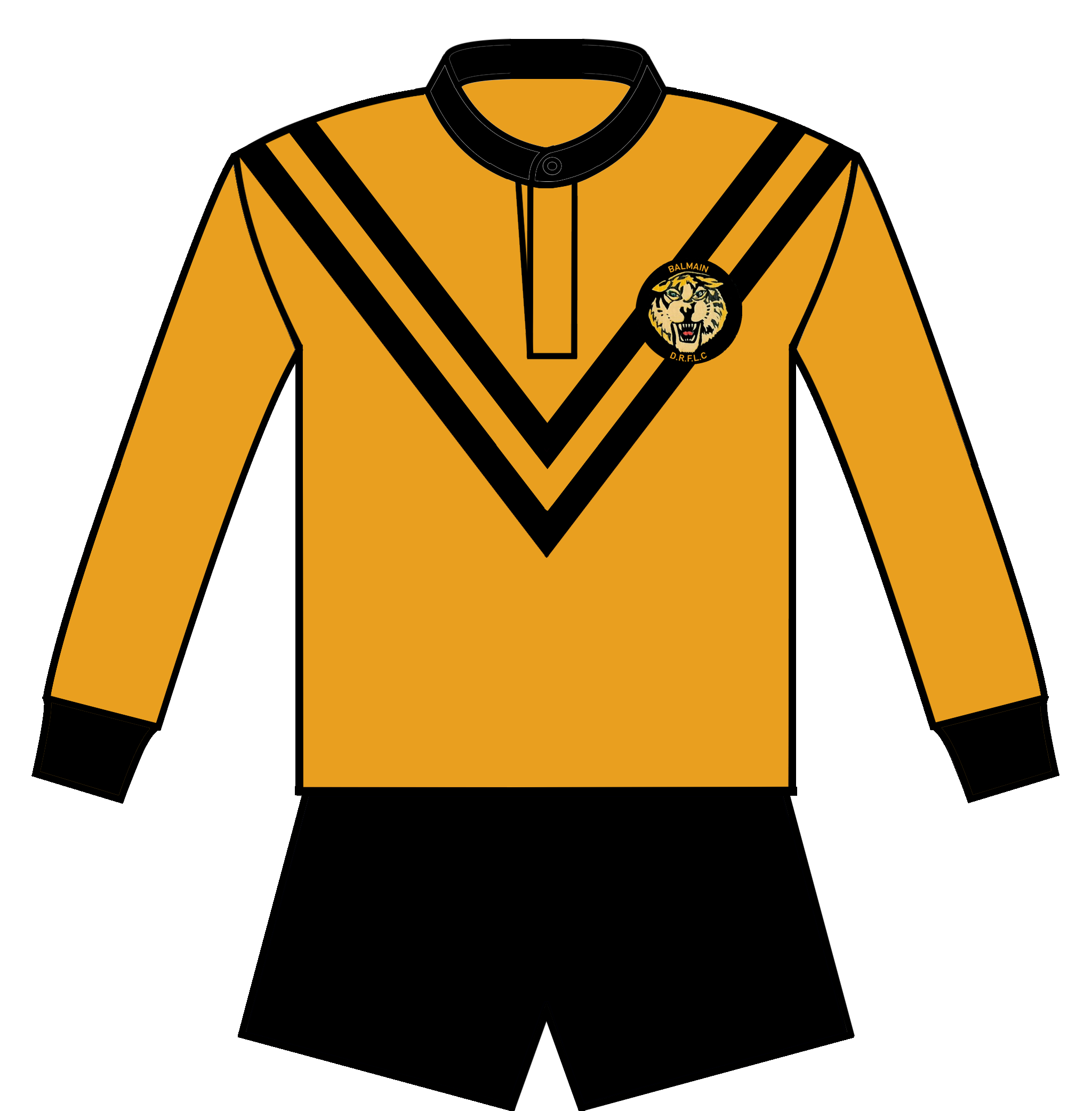
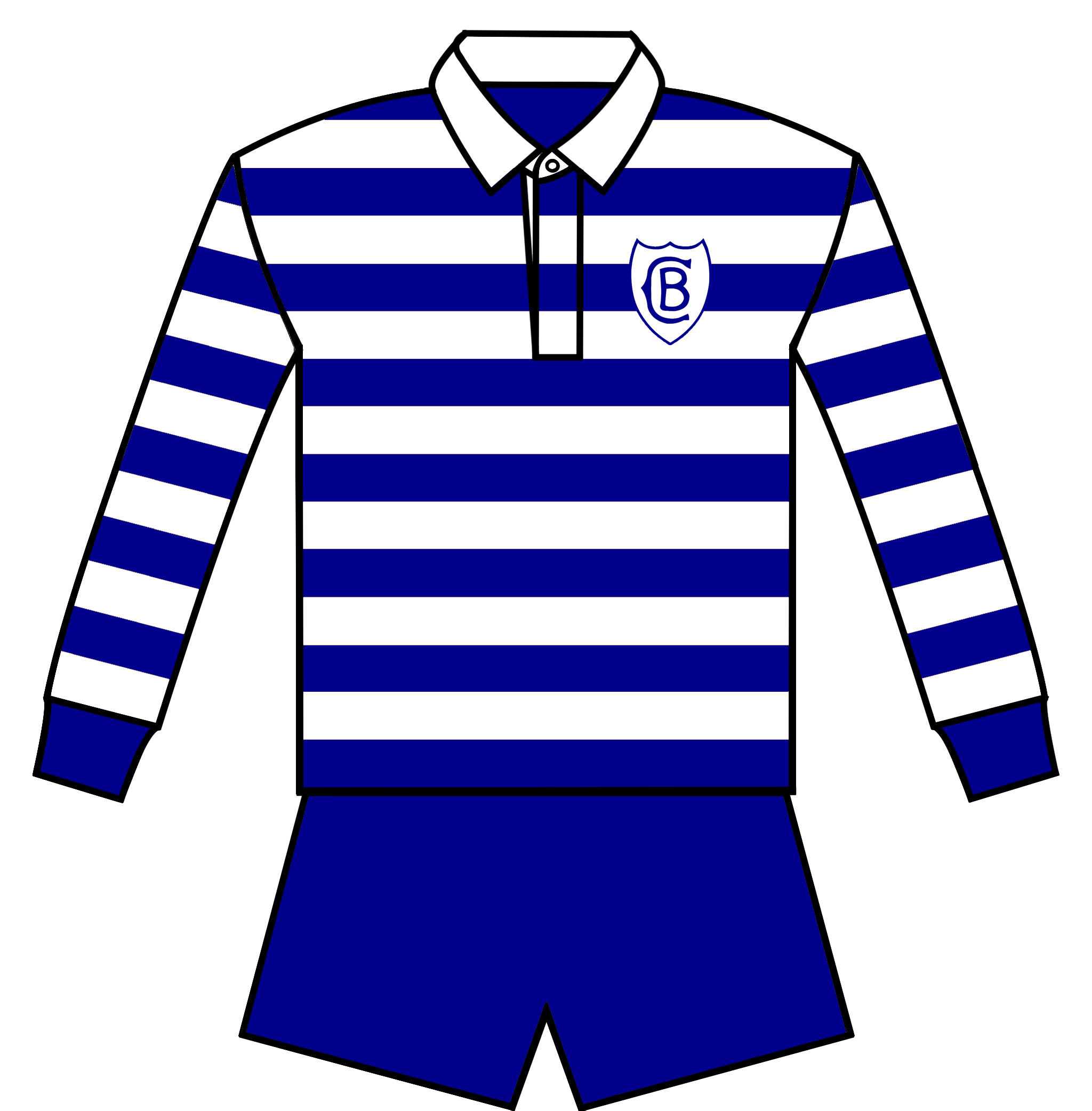
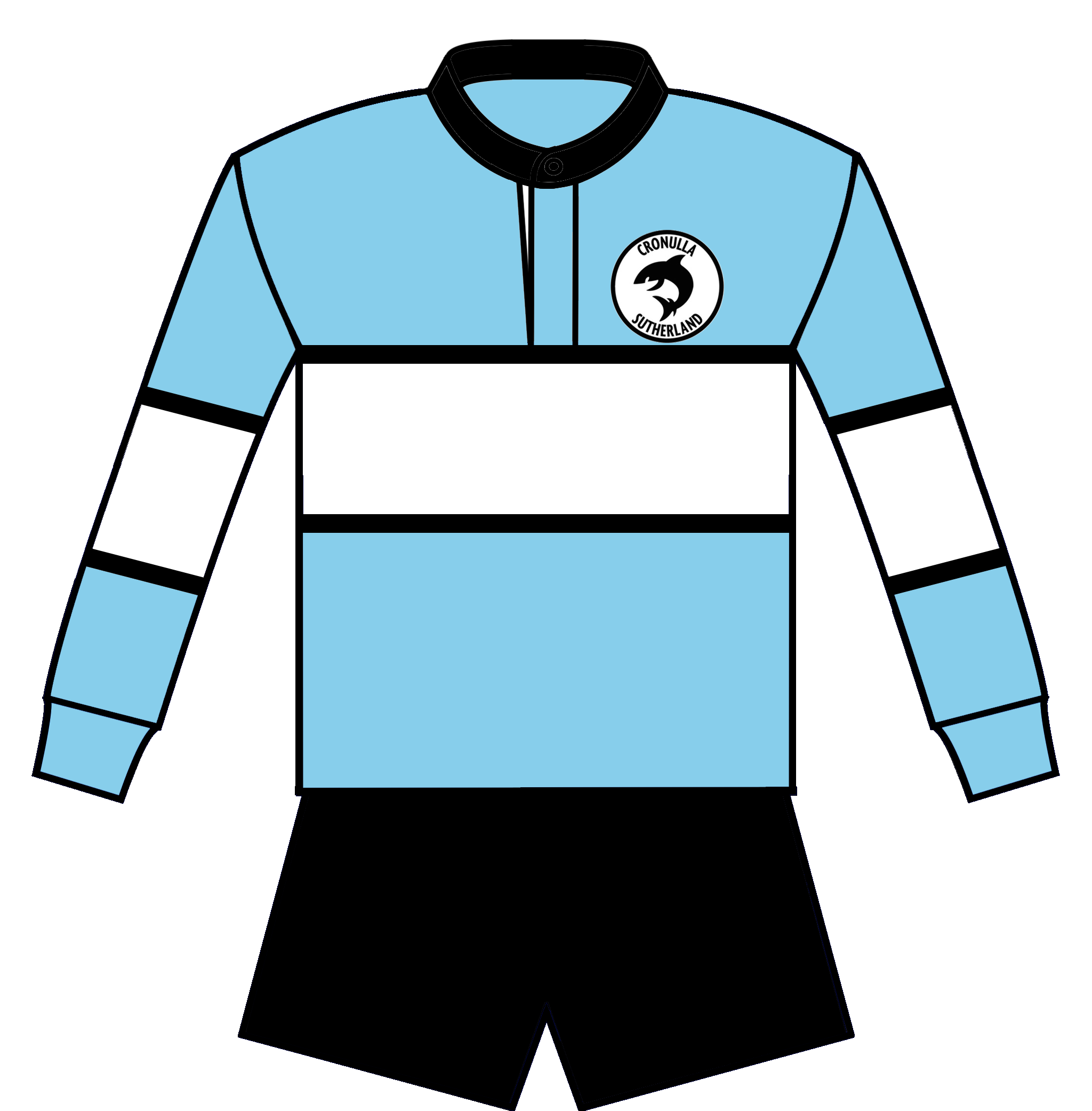
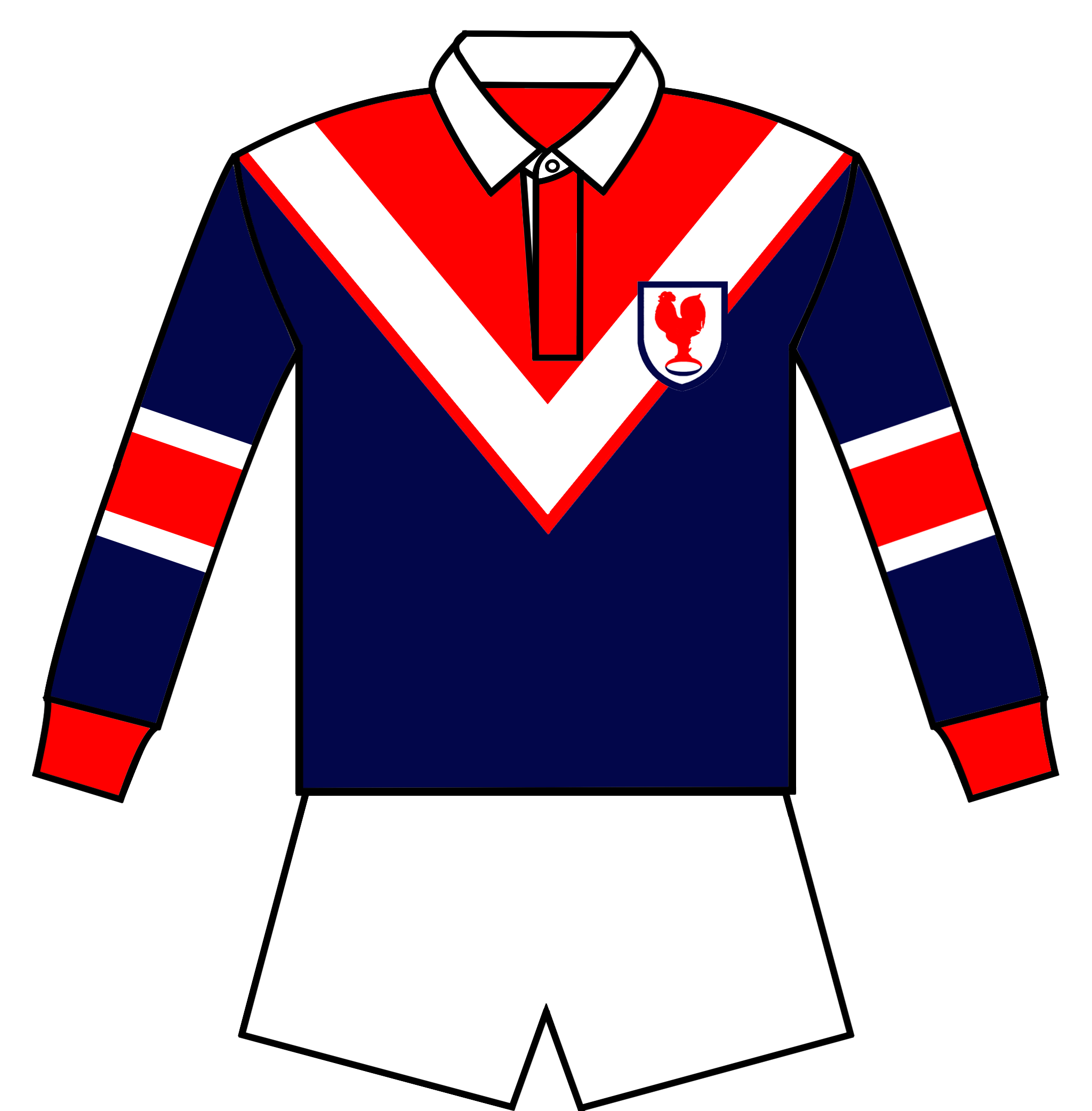
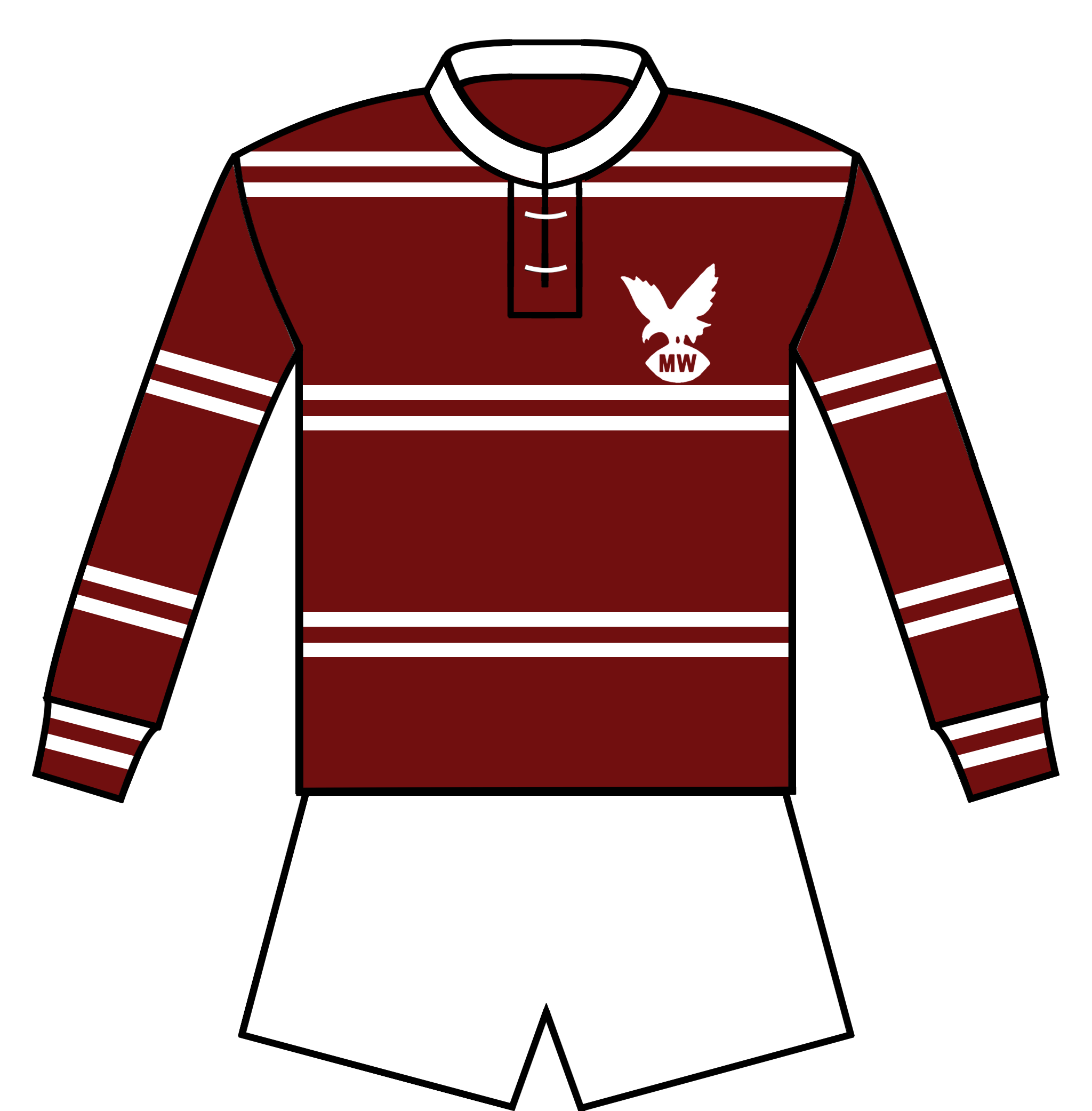
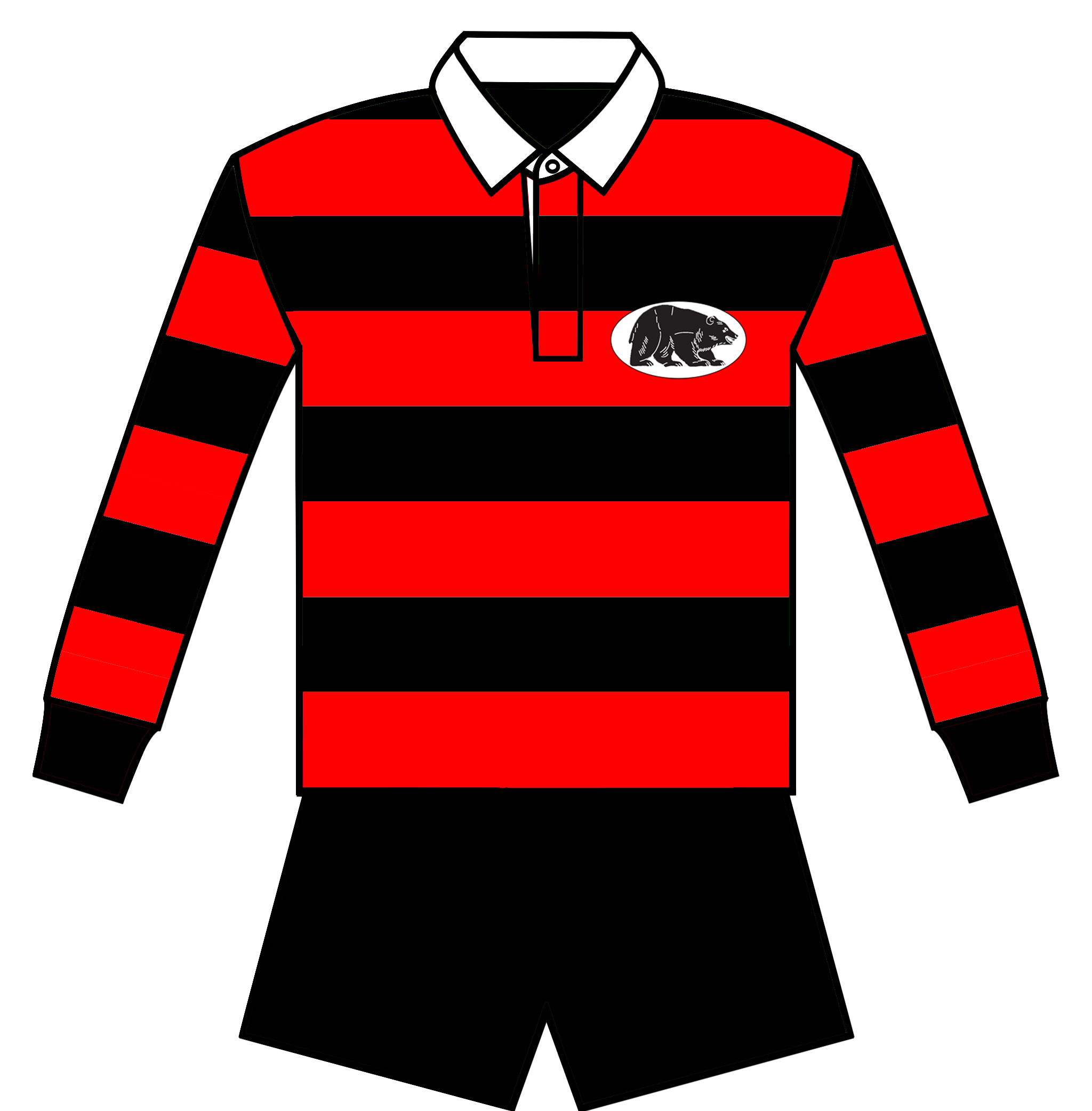
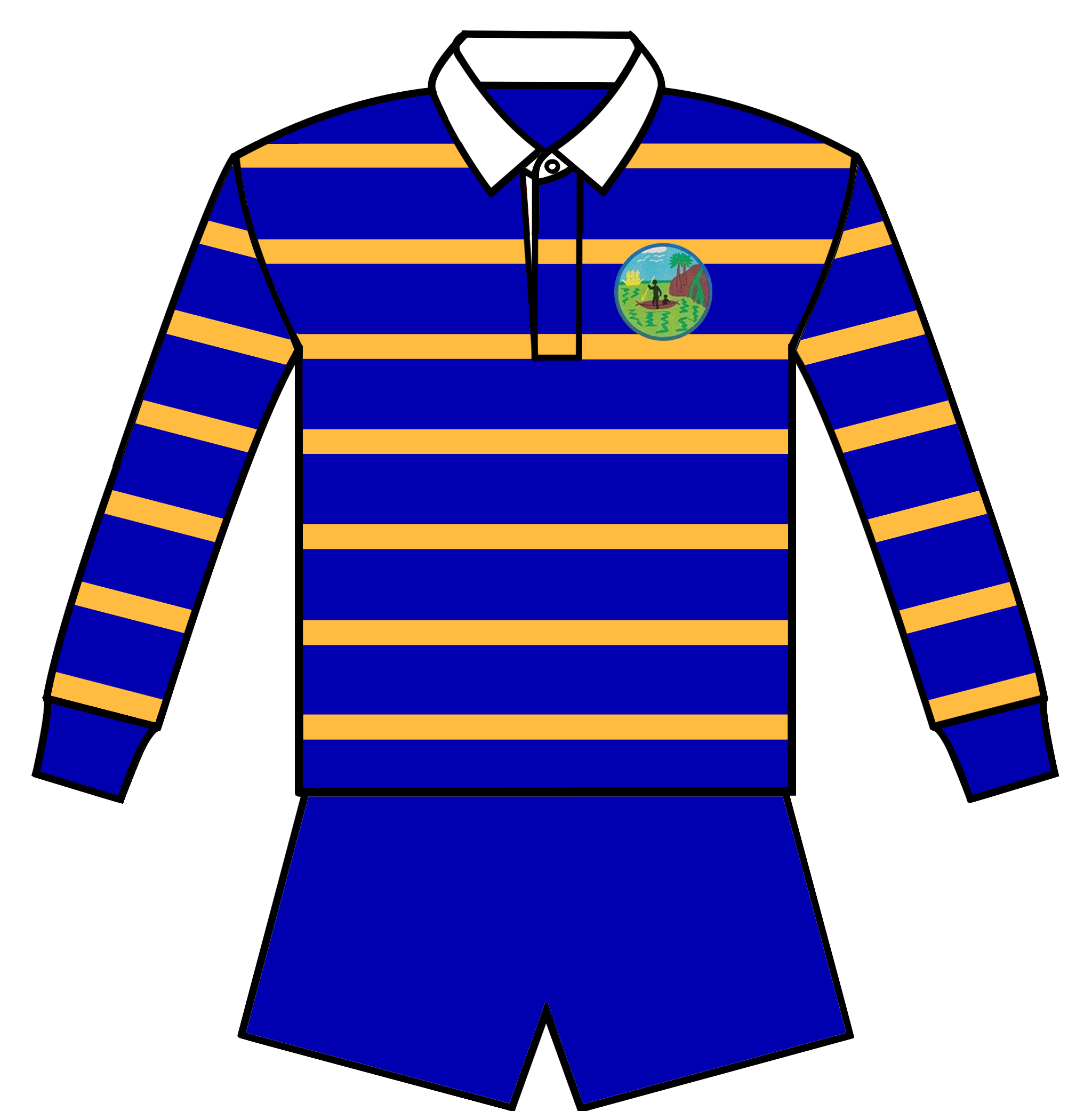
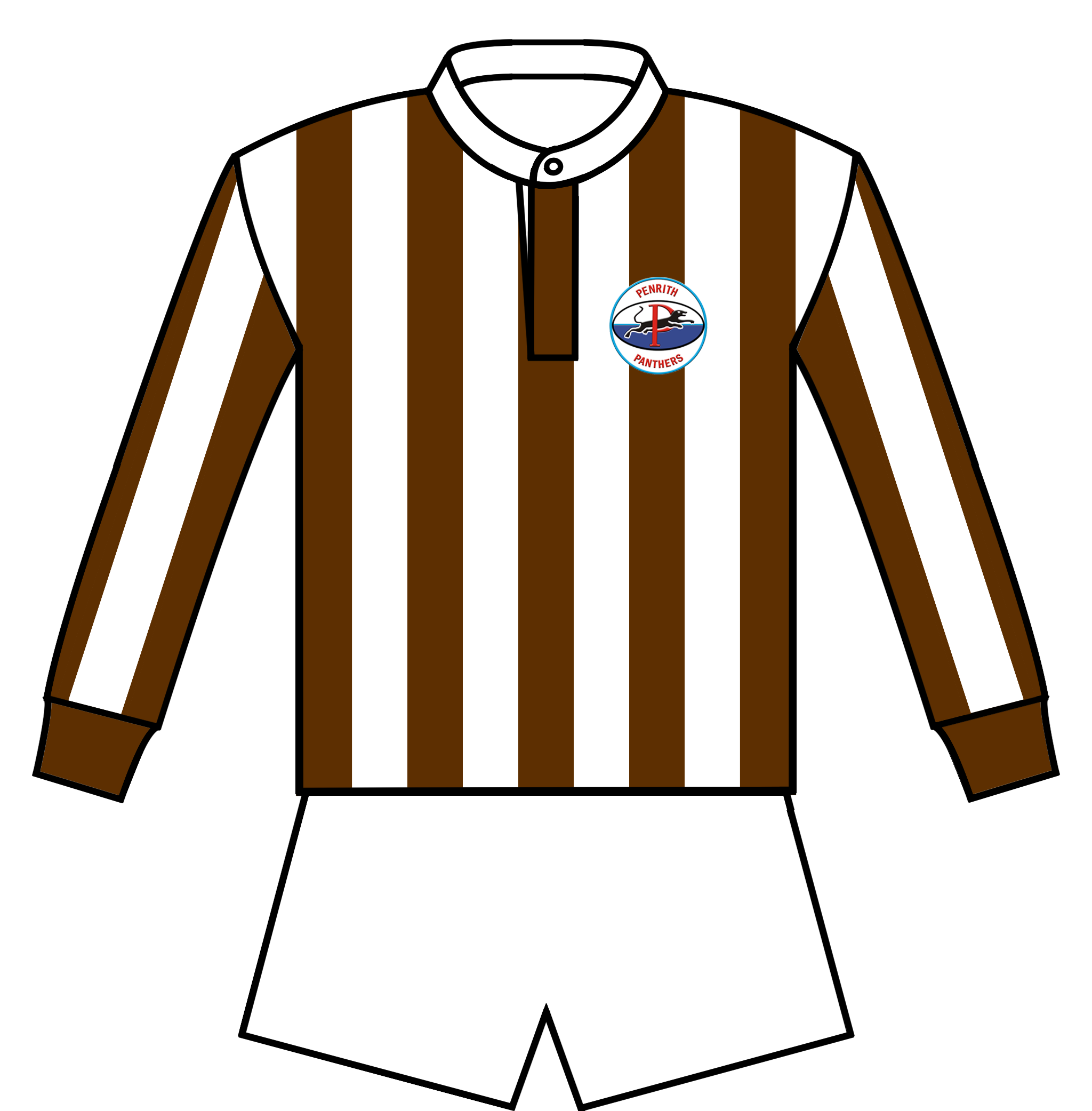
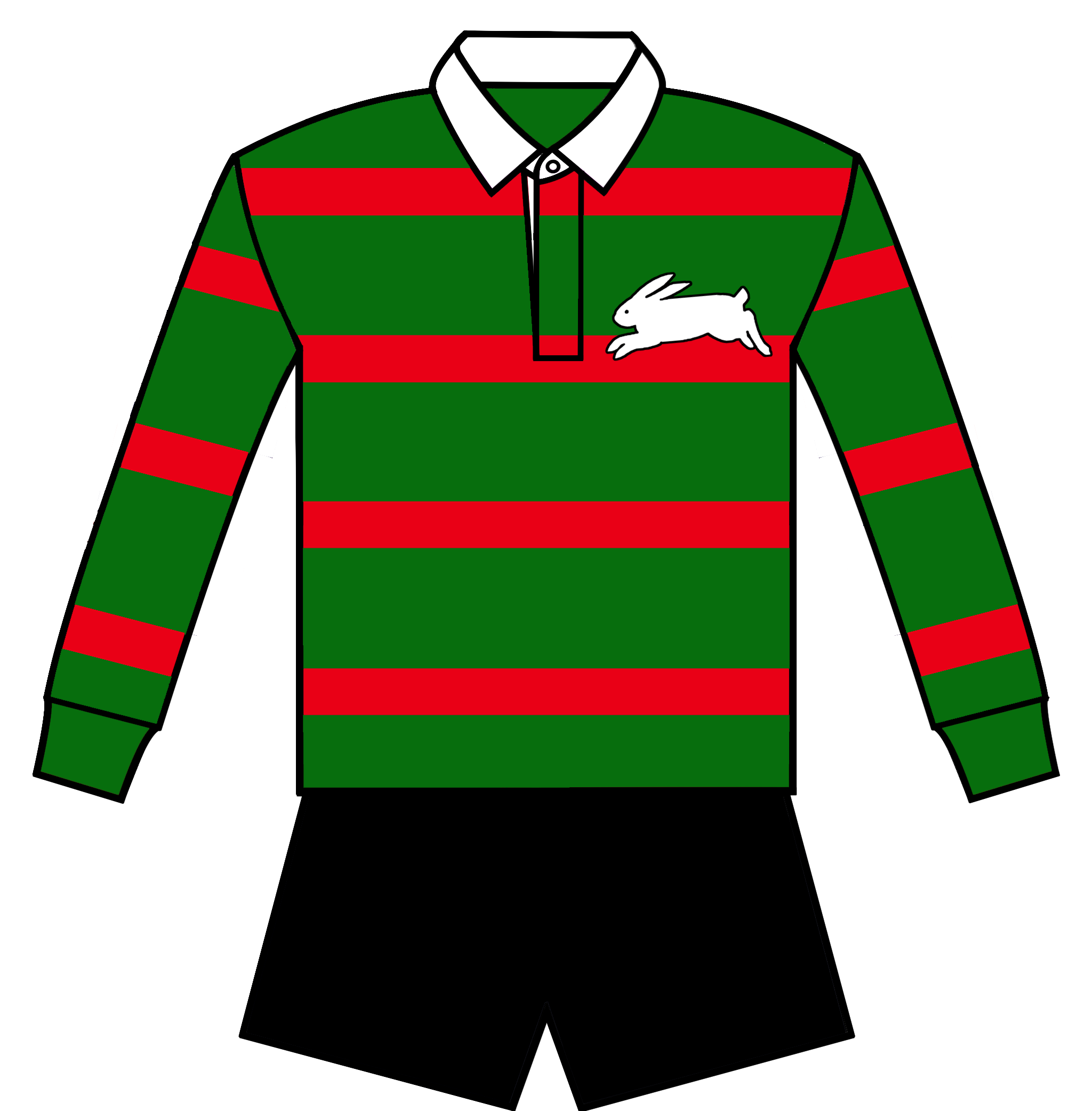
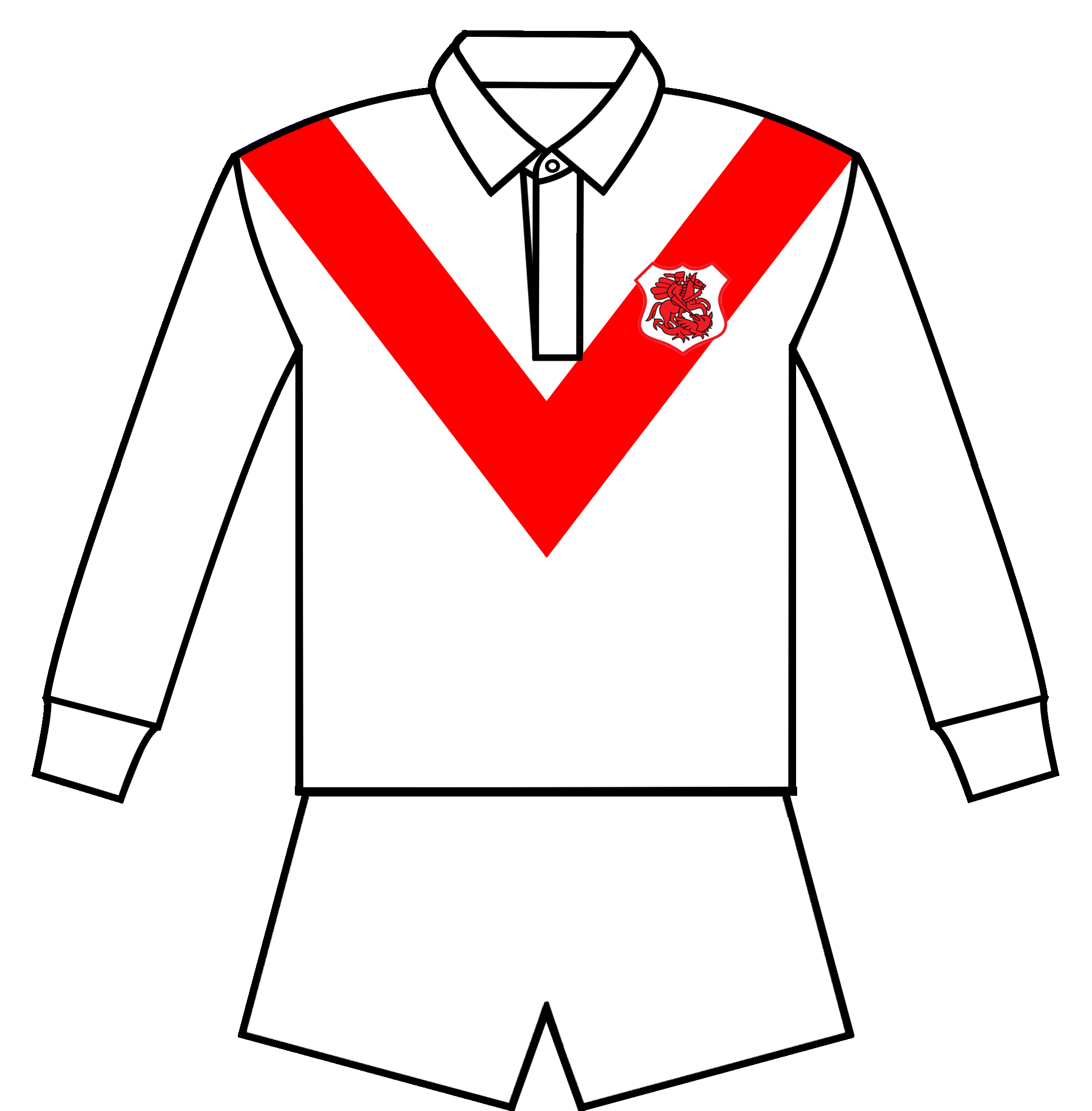
Balmain 64th season Ground: Sydney Sports Ground; Coach: Leo Nosworthy; Captain: Keith Outten	Canterbury-Bankstown 37th season Ground:Belmore Sports Ground; Coach: Bob Hagan; Captain(s): Johnny Greaves / Terry Reynolds	Cronulla-Sutherland 5th season Ground: Endeavour Field; Captain-coach: Tommy Bishop	Eastern Suburbs 64th season Ground: Sydney Sports Ground; Coach: Don Furner; Captain: Kevin Junee
Manly-Warringah 25th season Ground: Brookvale Oval; Coach: Ron Willey; Captain: Fred Jones	Newtown 64th season Ground: Henson Park; Coach: Harry Bath; Captain: Brian Moore / Barry Briggs	North Sydney 64th season Ground: North Sydney Oval; Coach: Merv Hicks; Captain: Noel Cavanagh	Parramatta 25th season Ground: Cumberland Oval; Coach: Ian Walsh; Captain: Dick Thornett
Penrith 5th season Ground: Penrith Park; Coach: Bob Boland; Captain: Ian McKechnie	South Sydney 64th season Ground: Redfern Oval; Coach: Clive Churchill; Captain: John Sattler	St. George 51st season Ground: Kogarah Jubilee Oval; Coach: Jack Gibson; Captain: Graeme Langlands	Western Suburbs 64th season Ground: Lidcombe Oval; Coach: Ron Watson; Captain: Tommy Raudonikis

== Regular season ==
Team	1	2	3	4	5	6	7	8	9	10	11	12	13	14	15	16	17	18	19	20	21	22	F1	F2	F3	GF
Balmain	**PEN** **+22**	SOU −17	**NEW** **+15**	EAS +3	**STG** **−25**	MAN −24	PAR −8	**WES** **+9**	**CRO** **+23**	CBY −12	**NOR** **+19**	PEN −4	**SOU** **−26**	NEW +3	EAS +6	**STG** **−9**	**MAN** **−18**	**PAR** **−11**	WES +4	CRO +2	**CBY** **+18**	NOR −2				
Canterbury-Bankstown	WES −43	**PAR** **−24**	MAN −27	NOR −7	**PEN** **+10**	SOU −17	STG +5	**EAS** **−17**	NEW −10	**BAL** **+12**	**CRO** **+16**	**WES** **+20**	PAR +1	**MAN** **−10**	**NOR** **+7**	PEN +12	**SOU** **+3**	**STG** **−12**	EAS +4	**NEW** **+14**	BAL −18	CRO −6				
Cronulla-Sutherland	**NOR** **+39**	**PEN** **+19**	SOU −1	NEW −1	EAS −6	STG −4	**WES** **+14**	**MAN** **+7**	BAL −23	PAR −9	CBY −16	NOR +1	PEN −4	**SOU** **−1**	**NEW** **+23**	**EAS** **−4**	STG +4	WES +9	MAN −15	**BAL** **−2**	**PAR** **+6**	**CBY** **+6**				
Eastern Suburbs	**NEW** **+19**	**MAN** **−14**	STG −16	**BAL** **−3**	**CRO** **+6**	**WES** **+11**	**NOR** **+2**	CBY +17	PAR −8	PEN −9	SOU −16	NEW +13	**MAN** **−5**	**STG**; **0**	**BAL** **−6**	CRO +4	WES −4	NOR −2	**CBY** **−4**	**PAR** **+26**	**PEN** **+5**	**SOU** **−11**				
Manly-Warringah	**PAR** **+29**	EAS +14	**CBY** **+27**	STG +4	NOR +10	**BAL** **+24**	SOU +8	CRO −7	**PEN** **+8**	WES +25	**NEW** **−12**	PAR +17	EAS +5	CBY +10	STG −17	**NOR** **+43**	BAL +18	SOU +1	**CRO** **+15**	PEN +21	**WES** **+5**	**NEW** **+20**	X	**SOU** **−6**	**STG** **−3**	
Newtown	EAS −19	**STG** **−11**	BAL −15	**CRO** **+1**	**WES** **+1**	PAR −10	**PEN** **+23**	NOR; 0	**CBY** **+10**	**SOU** **−11**	MAN +12	**EAS** **−13**	STG −2	**BAL** **−3**	CRO −23	WES −8	**PAR** **+5**	PEN −17	**NOR** **+4**	CBY −14	SOU −9	MAN −20				
North Sydney	CRO −39	**WES** **+5**	PAR −26	**CBY** **+7**	**MAN** **−10**	PEN −5	EAS −2	**NEW**; **0**	SOU −2	**STG** **−4**	BAL −19	**CRO** **−1**	WES −2	**PAR** **−3**	CBY −7	MAN −43	**PEN** **−4**	**EAS** **+2**	NEW −4	**SOU** **−33**	STG +7	**BAL** **+2**				
Parramatta	MAN −29	CBY +24	**NOR** **+26**	PEN −12	**SOU** **−7**	**NEW** **+10**	**BAL** **+8**	STG +9	**EAS** **+8**	**CRO** **+9**	**WES** **+16**	**MAN** **−17**	**CBY** **−1**	NOR +3	**PEN** **+11**	SOU −11	NEW −5	BAL +11	**STG** **−1**	EAS −26	CRO −6	WES +8	STG −11			
Penrith	BAL −22	CRO −19	WES +9	**PAR** **+12**	CBY −10	**NOR** **+5**	NEW −23	**SOU** **−2**	MAN −8	**EAS** **+9**	STG −16	**BAL** **+4**	**CRO** **+4**	**WES** **+6**	PAR −11	**CBY** **−12**	NOR +4	**NEW** **+17**	SOU +7	**MAN** **−21**	EAS −5	**STG** **−17**				
South Sydney	**STG** **+6**	**BAL** **+17**	**CRO** **+1**	WES +24	PAR +7	**CBY** **+17**	**MAN** **−8**	PEN +2	**NOR** **+2**	NEW +11	**EAS** **+16**	**STG** **−2**	BAL +26	CRO +1	**WES** **+18**	**PAR** **+11**	CBY −3	**MAN** **−1**	**PEN** **−7**	NOR +33	**NEW** **+9**	EAS +11	X	MAN +6	X	**STG** **+6**
St. George	SOU −6	NEW +11	**EAS** **+16**	**MAN** **−4**	BAL +25	**CRO** **+4**	**CBY** **−5**	**PAR** **−9**	**WES** **+6**	NOR +4	**PEN** **+16**	SOU +2	**NEW** **+2**	EAS; 0	**MAN** **+17**	BAL +9	**CRO** **−4**	CBY +12	PAR +1	WES +2	**NOR** **−7**	PEN +17	**PAR** **+11**	X	MAN +3	SOU −6
Western Suburbs	**CBY** **+43**	NOR −5	**PEN** **−9**	**SOU** **−24**	NEW −1	EAS −11	CRO −14	BAL −9	STG −6	**MAN** **−25**	PAR −16	CBY −20	**NOR** **+2**	PEN −6	SOU −18	**NEW** **+8**	**EAS** **+4**	**CRO** **−9**	**BAL** **−4**	**STG** **−2**	MAN −5	**PAR** **−8**				
Team	1	2	3	4	5	6	7	8	9	10	11	12	13	14	15	16	17	18	19	20	21	22	F1	F2	F3	GF

Bold – Home game
X – Bye
Opponent for round listed above margin

=== Ladder ===
	Team	Pld	W	D	L	PF	PA	PD	Pts
1	Manly	22	19	0	3	528	260	+268	38
2	South Sydney	22	17	0	5	499	308	+191	34
3	St. George	22	15	1	6	392	283	+109	31
4	Parramatta	22	12	0	10	383	355	+28	24
5	Balmain	22	11	0	11	366	398	-32	22
6	Canterbury	22	11	0	11	335	422	-87	22
7	Cronulla	22	10	0	12	352	310	+42	20
8	Penrith	22	10	0	12	283	372	-89	20
9	Eastern Suburbs	22	9	1	12	344	339	+5	19
10	Newtown	22	7	1	14	282	401	-119	15
11	North Sydney	22	5	1	16	265	446	-181	11
12	Western Suburbs	22	4	0	18	336	471	-135	8

=== Ladder progression ===
- Numbers highlighted in green indicate that the team finished the round inside the top 4.
- Numbers highlighted in blue indicates the team finished first on the ladder in that round.
- Numbers highlighted in red indicates the team finished last place on the ladder in that round.

	Team	1	2	3	4	5	6	7	8	9	10	11	12	13	14	15	16	17	18	19	20	21	22
1	Manly-Warringah	2	4	6	8	10	12	14	14	16	18	18	20	22	24	24	26	28	30	32	34	36	38
2	South Sydney	2	4	6	8	10	12	12	14	16	18	20	20	22	24	26	28	28	28	28	30	32	34
3	St. George	0	2	4	4	6	8	8	8	10	12	14	16	18	19	21	23	23	25	27	29	29	31
4	Parramatta	0	2	4	4	4	6	8	10	12	14	16	16	16	18	20	20	20	22	22	22	22	24
5	Balmain	2	2	4	6	6	6	6	8	10	10	12	12	12	14	16	16	16	16	18	20	22	22
6	Canterbury-Bankstown	0	0	0	0	2	2	4	4	4	6	8	10	12	12	14	16	18	18	20	22	22	22
7	Cronulla-Sutherland	2	4	4	4	4	4	6	8	8	8	8	10	10	10	12	12	14	16	16	16	18	20
8	Penrith	0	0	2	4	4	6	6	6	6	8	8	10	12	14	14	14	16	18	20	20	20	20
9	Eastern Suburbs	2	2	2	2	4	6	8	10	10	10	10	12	12	13	13	15	15	15	15	17	19	19
10	Newtown	0	0	0	2	4	4	6	7	9	9	11	11	11	11	11	11	13	13	15	15	15	15
11	North Sydney	0	2	2	4	4	4	4	5	5	5	5	5	5	5	5	5	5	7	7	7	9	11
12	Western Suburbs	2	2	2	2	2	2	2	2	2	2	2	2	4	4	4	6	8	8	8	8	8	8

== Finals ==
Under the guidance of revolutionary head-coach Jack Gibson who was in 1971 beginning to embrace the attitude and training methods used in the United States' National Football League, St. George in 1971 had reached the Grand Final in all three grades. They were to lose all three matches. (5–11 v Canterbury-Bankstown in Third Grade; 5–19 v Canterbury-Bankstown in Reserve Grade and 10–16 v South Sydney in the top grade).

Home	Score	Away	Match Information
Home	Score	Away	Date and Time	Venue	Referee	Crowd
Semi-finals
St. George	19–8	Parramatta	28 August 1971	Sydney Cricket Ground	Keith Page	38,157
Manly-Warringah	13–19	South Sydney	4 September 1971	Sydney Cricket Ground	Keith Holman	50,261
Preliminary Final
Manly-Warringah	12–15	St. George	11 September 1971	Sydney Cricket Ground	Keith Page	45,883
Grand Final
South Sydney	16–10	St. George	18 September 1971	Sydney Cricket Ground	Keith Holman	62,838

=== Grand Final ===
South Sydney	Position	St. George
1. Eric Simms	FB	1. Graeme Langlands (c)
2. Keith Edwards	WG	2. Ken Batty
3. Paul Sait	CE	3. Bob Clapham
4. Bob Honan	CE	4. Ken Maddison
5. Ray Branighan	WG	5. Geoff Carr
6. Denis Pittard	FE	6. Tony Branson
7. Bob Grant	HB	7. Billy Smith
13. John Sattler (c)	PR	13. Harry Eden
12. George Piggins	HK	12. Colin Rasmussen
11. John O'Neill	PR	11. Grahame Bowen
10. Bob McCarthy	SR	10. Peter Fitzgerald
9. Gary Stevens	SR	9. Barry Beath
8. Ron Coote	LK	8. Ted Walton
	Reserve	22. Mick Dryden
	Reserve	39. Russell Cox
Clive Churchill	Coach	Jack Gibson

Against a battle-hardened South Sydney side with a larger pack, the young Dragons went into the Grand Final as clear underdogs. Only Smith, Madison and Langlands for St. George had Grand Final experience of the level enjoyed by the entire Rabbitoh pack. Many of the Rabbitohs were playing in their fourth or fifth successive Grand Final.

The first half was a gruelling affair, with the sole point coming from an Eric Simms field goal. McCarthy crossed the Dragons’ try-line in the sixth minute but was called back on a forward pass ruling by referee Holman. Simms attempted a long-range field goal in the eighth minute which was unsuccessful, and Grant took another vain field goal shot minutes later. Souths dominated possession and field-position in the first fifteen minutes and were just held at bay by the rugged defence of the Dragons, especially from their centre, Clapham. Pittard made a 75 metres (82 yd) break at the fourteen-minute mark and was brought down 3 metres (3.28 yd) from the Dragons’ line by a desperate diving tackle from Smith. In the fifteenth minute Simms took another field goal attempt from dead in front and was successful. Souths attack was free-flowing, and they kept the play alive with late offloads whilst St. George adopted a more structured play of one-off running or moving the ball across the backline. In the twentieth minute Beath was stopped in the Souths' corner by a classy Coote cover tackle.

Langlands missed two penalty goal attempts in the first half, one mid-way through the period and another shortly before the break. Only Beath and Smith regularly broke through Souths' defences. At the interval Souths were in front by the unlikely scoreline of 1–0.

When play resumed Souths continued with their adventurous style of keeping the ball alive, they broke through poor Dragon defence and Branighan scored in the corner. Simms hit the post with the conversion attempt. Cox had replaced Bowen for St. George at half-time. Sattler tested out Cox early in the half with niggle and surreptitious fouls and appeared to eye-gouge Langlands in the 55th minute. The match began to turn spiteful at that point when Beath was penalised for using his knees on McCarthy. Coote scored the second try after a break by Sait, Simms converted and then added a penalty goal a few minutes later. At this stage Souths held an 11–0 lead and looked to be racing away with the match as St. George failed to complete tackles allowing the Rabbitohs to continually off-load.

The Dragons then rallied and fought back with a try to Barry Beath after a brave blind-side fifth tackle move by Billy Smith which was followed by a magnificent sideline conversion from Langlands. Smith was proving to be the Dragons’ only attacking spark until he was collared by Piggins and Sattler in a cynical head high tackle at the 65th minute. With the penalty that ensued Langlands took play to the other end of the field and Ted Walton scored for St. George. Langlands again converted from out wide. With the score at 11–10 and only twelve minutes remaining, Saints looked to be getting on top of their more fancied rivals. However a match-winning try two minutes from full-time by Bob McCarthy running freely off Ron Coote, showed the experience of the Rabbitohs, who took their fourth title in a five-year period.

McCarthy and Coote had starred for Souths and continually threatened to split the Dragons' defence. Souths hooker George Piggins who had been called into the side to replace regular season rake Elwyn Walters, was hailed as a hero, playing himself to a standstill in what was ultimately a closely fought encounter.

The victory was to be South Sydney's last for a period of 43 years, with the club not to win another Premiership until 2014.

South Sydney 16 (Tries: Branighan, Coote, McCarthy. Goals: Simms 3. Field Goal: Simms.)

St. George 10 (Tries: Beath, Walton. Goals: Langlands 2.)

== Player statistics ==
The following statistics are as of the conclusion of Round 22.

Top 5 point scorers

Points	Player	Tries	Goals	Field Goals
171	Graeme Langlands	11	69	0
169	Eric Simms	3	80	0
137	Derek Moritz	13	49	0
135	Keith Campbell	1	66	0
130	Allan McKean	0	65	0

Top 5 try scorers

Tries	Player
18	Paul Cross
17	Ray Corcoran
15	Bob McCarthy
15	Bob Fulton
14	Ken Irvine

Top 5 goal scorers

Goals	Player
80	Eric Simms
69	Graeme Langlands
66	Keith Campbell
65	Allan McKean
52	Bob Batty
