= Barry Beath =

Australia international rugby league footballer

Personal information
- Full name: Barry Francis Beath
- Born: 1 January 1944 (age 82) Eugowra, New South Wales, Australia
- Height: 180 cm (5 ft 11 in)
- Weight: 95 kg (14 st 13 lb)

Playing information
- Position: Second-row, Prop
Club
Years	Team	Pld	T	G	FG	P
1966–77	St. George	198	61	0	0	183
Representative
Years	Team	Pld	T	G	FG	P
1965	NSW Country	1	0	0	0	0
1965–71	New South Wales	3	1	0	0	3
1965–71	Australia	1	0	0	0	0

Barry Beath (born in Eugowra, New South Wales) is an Australian former professional rugby league footballer, a second-row forward for the St. George Dragons in the New South Wales Rugby League premiership competition. He represented for New South Wales and in the Australia national rugby league team.

== Career ==
Beath was first selected in 1965 for New South Wales and Australia from Country Representative honours while playing for Eugowra. In 1966 he joined St. George in the final year of their 11-year premiership run. Beath had his own 12-year run with the Dragons from 1966 to 1977, with the distinction of being with a premiership winning club in his first and last years in the NSWRL. His only grand final win was actually his last ever match when came on as reserve in the 1977 Grand Final win.

Beath played 198 first grade games and scored 61 tries for the St. George Dragons during his long career.

He was awarded Life Membership of St. George in 1976.

Barry's name remains popular in Australian rhyming slang. Ie look at your Barry Beath meaning teeth.

== Representative career ==
Beath represented New South Wales in 1965, 1967 and 1971. He represented Australia again in 1971 against New Zealand, having played in the Dragons Grand Final loss that year to South Sydney where he scored a try. He is listed on the Australian Players Register as Kangaroo No. 393.
