= Keith Edwards (rugby league) =

Australian rugby league footballer

Personal information
- Full name: Keith Edwards
- Born: 1947; Kingsford, New South Wales

Playing information
- Position: Wing
Club
Years	Team	Pld	T	G	FG	P
1969–75	South Sydney	85	28	0	0	84

Keith Edwards (born 1947) is an Australian former rugby league footballer who played in the 1960s and 1970s.

== Playing career ==
A local junior, Edwards played for the South Sydney Rabbitohs for six seasons between 1969 and 1975. He is best remembered as a winger in the victorious 1971 Grand Final team. He retired at the conclusion of the 1975 season.
