= Peter Fitzgerald (rugby league) =

Australian rugby league footballer

Personal information
- Full name: Peter Fitzgerald
- Born: 22 January 1951 (age 75) Canowindra, New South Wales, Australia

Playing information
- Position: Second-row
Club
Years	Team	Pld	T	G	FG	P
1969–75	St George Dragons	95	7	0	0	21
1976	Sydney Roosters	10	2	0	0	6
	Total	105	9	0	0	27
- Source: Whiticker/Hudson

Peter Fitzgerald (born 1951) is an Australian former rugby league footballer who played in the 1960s and 1970s.

== Career ==
Remembered as a ferocious tackler and originally from Canowindra, New South Wales, Peter Fitzgerald came to St George Dragons as an 18-year-old in 1969 on the recommendation of Ian Walsh. He gave great service to St George Dragons in the seven seasons that he played for them between 1969–1975, which included his appearance in two (losing) Grand Finals of 1971 and 1975, and many semi final appearances.

After the Grand Final defeat in 1975, Peter Fitzgerald moved to Sydney Roosters for one year in 1976 and re-united with his former coach Jack Gibson. Fitzgerald finished his career at Port Kembla where he captained the team to win the 1980 Wollongong premiership under the coaching of his old friend and ex team-mate, Graeme Langlands.

Peter Fitzgerald has been in the real-estate business in Wollongong for many years and still resides there.
