= Arthur Moymow =

Australian rugby league administrator

Arthur Victor Moymow (1884–1944) was an Australian rugby league administrator. He was also a co-founder of the St. George Dragons District rugby league football club in 1921.

== Rugby league administrator ==
Arthur Moymow was born in Sydney in 1884. He studied bookkeeping and accountancy, and became a foundation member and the first treasurer of the St. George Dragons rugby league club. He held that position until 1932, before moving to Newcastle, New South Wales. He was also the president of the St. George Junior League and also the president of the St. George Referees' Association.

After relocating to Newcastle, he was later the Secretary/Treasurer of the Northern Suburbs Newcastle Rugby League Club, and the Wickham Cricket Club and Hamilton Cricket Club in Newcastle, New South Wales.

Arthur Moymow was awarded Life Membership of the St. George Dragons in 1941.

Arthur Moymow, St.George District Hon. Treasurer. 1927

== War service ==
Arthur Moymow joined the Second Australian Imperial Force (AIF) in an administrative role with the recruitment staff in 1941 but died suddenly, at his Hamilton home, on 18 October 1944, age 60. Moymow was buried at the Sandgate War Cemetery on 20 October 1944.
