= Club Managers' Association Australia =

Australian trade union

CMAA
- Club Managers' Association Australia
- Founded: 1964
- Headquarters: Auburn, New South Wales
- Location: Australia
- Members: ▼1,227 (as at 31 December 2024)
- Key people: William Clegg, president Allan Peter, federal secretary
- Affiliations: ACTU
- Website: www.cmaa.asn.au

The Club Managers' Association Australia (CMAA) is a trade union in Australia. It represents approximately 2800 professional managers of clubs. It was founded in 1964 as the Club Managers' Association, and then changed its name in 1967 to the Secretaries' and Managers' Association of Australia and adopted its current name in 1993.

The CMAA is affiliated with the Australian Council of Trade Unions.

With the Leagues Club Association of New South Wales it produced in 1998 a joint submission to the Productivity Commission on Australia's gambling industries.

Former rugby league representative players Latchem Robinson and Snowy Justice were, as leagues club secretary-managers instrumental in the establishment of the association in Sydney in 1964.
