= Norm Robinson =

Australian former RL coach and professional rugby league footballer

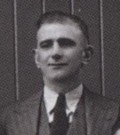
- Latchem in 1939

Personal information
- Full name: Norman Charles Robinson
- Born: 29 January 1901 Balmain, Sydney, Australia
- Died: 18 March 1980 (aged 79) Milton, Sydney, Australia

Playing information
- Position: Halfback
Club
Years	Team	Pld	T	G	FG	P
1924–27	Balmain	38	11	7	0	47
1928	Cootamundra
1929–33	Balmain	34	8	14	0	52
1934–37	Yanco
	Total	72	19	21	0	99
Representative
Years	Team	Pld	T	G	FG	P
1925–26	New South Wales	5	1	0	0	3
1928	Southern NSW

Coaching information
Club
Years	Team	Gms	W	D	L	W%
1930	Balmain	14	5	2	7	36
1944–47	Balmain	72	48	5	19	67
1954–56	Balmain	57	31	2	24	54
	Total	143	84	9	50	59
Representative
Years	Team	Gms	W	D	L	W%
1948	New South Wales	4	3	0	1	75
1953	American All Stars	1	0	0	1	0
1958	Australia	3	1	0	2	33
- Source: Rugby League Project As of 2 June 2013

Norman "Latchem" Robinson (29 January 1901 – 18 March 1980) was an Australian professional rugby league footballer, coach, selector and club administrator for the Balmain Tigers club in Sydney and a City, State and National selector and manager. He also served as NSW and Australian coach in 1948 and 1958 respectively.

== Playing career ==
Robinson was graded at Balmain in 1922 as a halfback. He was a member of the Balmain Tigers team that won the Premiership in the 1924 NSWRFL season. Robinson was selected in the New South Wales rugby league team between 1925 and 1926, playing a total of 5 games for the Blues. He played in the Maher Cup for Cootamundra in 1928, gaining representative selection for Southern Division in a match against Great Britain. Robinson then returned to Sydney and continued playing for Balmain. The final years of his career were spent playing for Yanco's club.

Balmain Premiers 1939 - Norman back row 2nd from right

== Coaching career ==
Robinson had three separate coaching spells with the Balmain club. He coached the Balmain Tigers in 1930, 1944, 1945, 1946, 1947, 1954, 1955 and 1956 before retiring. He was coach of New South Wales in 1948. Also, in 1953, he coached the American "All Stars" during their tour of Australia. He was manager of the Australian team in the 1957 Rugby League World Cup. He was appointed coach of the Australian team for the 1958 Ashes series against the touring Great Britain Lions. The British won the series 2–1 after winning Game 2 in Brisbane and Game 3 in Sydney.

== Administrative career ==
Robinson was for many years after his playing retirement a Secretary-Manager of the Balmain Leagues Club. Together with the St George administrator Snowy Justice, Robinson's former representative playing peer, he was one of the seminal forces behind the establishment of the Club Managers' Association of Australia at its foundation in 1964. Robinson was awarded a Life Membership of that organisation for outstanding service to the club industry.

== Accolades ==
The Wests Tigers Team of the Century was announced in 2004, encompassing the best players from both Balmain and Western Suburbs. Norm Robinson was voted the Coach of the Century.

The "Latchem" Robinson stand at Leichhardt Oval, Balmain's home ground, is named in his honour. Norm Robinson died 12 days before the opening of the stand by Neville Wran, premier of New South Wales and Tiger supporter, in 1980.

His largely attended funeral was held at St. Thomas's Church, Rozelle, New South Wales on 21 March 1980 and he was cremated at Northern Suburbs Crematorium.

Sporting positions
Preceded by Arthur Patton; 1952–1953	Coach Balmain; 1954–1956	Succeeded by Sid Ryan; 1957
Preceded by Bill Kelly; 1938–1943	Coach Balmain; 1944–1947	Succeeded by Athol Smith; 1948–1950
Preceded by Reg Latta; 1929	Coach Balmain; 1930	Succeeded by Cec Fifield; 1930
