= Reg Fusedale =

Australian rugby league footballer and administrator

Personal information
- Full name: Reginald Douglas Fusedale
- Born: 16 December 1890 Sydney, New South Wales, Australia
- Died: 8 August 1990 (aged 99) Arncliffe, New South Wales, Australia

Playing information
- Position: Centre
Club
Years	Team	Pld	T	G	FG	P
1919–20	South Sydney	12	5	2	0	19
1921–22	St. George	16	0	7	0	14
	Total	28	5	9	0	33

Reginald Douglas Fusedale (1890–1990) was an Australian rugby league footballer who played in the 1910s and 1920s. He was also a successful sports administrator.

== Sporting career ==
Born Douglas Reginald Fusedale to Harry and Marion Fusedale in Sydney in December 1890, Reg Fusedale's rugby league career started at South Sydney, where he played two seasons in 1919–1920. He then moved to the St. George District and played two seasons at St. George between 1921 and 1922, and played in the club's first game on 23 April 1921. He was also a noted cricketer and played against the legendary Victor Trumper, scoring a century in same match that Trumper did at Chatswood Oval in 1913.

Reg Fusedale. St.George first grade 1921, age 30

== Administrative career ==
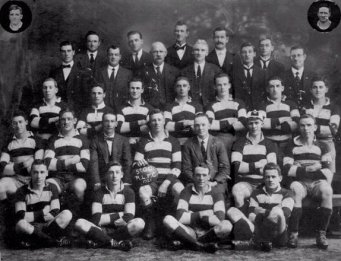
St.George 1921 foundation. Fusedale centre of 3rd row

In 1922, he became the St. George second club secretary, serving in that capacity from 1922 to 1938. He was awarded Life Membership of St. George in 1938, Life Membership of the NSWRFL in 1942 and also the N.S.W. Leagues Club, Phillip Street.

In 1923, The Rugby League News quoted, "As a sport organizer, Reg Fusedale stands second to none."

== Death ==
Reg Fusedale lived an extraordinarily long life, and died in his 100th year on 8 August 1990 at the Macquarie Lodge Nursing Home.
