= Barry Cox (singer) =

Hong Kong singer, and actor

- Born: Merseyside, Liverpool
- Occupations: Actor; singer
- Known for: Hong Kong TVB

Barry Cox is a British-Chinese pop singer.

He has performed in the United Kingdom, Hong Kong, China, Macau, Malaysia, and Singapore, and has taken part in commercials, theatrical performances, film, TV and radio shows. In 2008, he completed his first single “Feel the Love” which was recorded by Shlepp Entertainment Limited. In 2013 he signed with Hong Kong TVB as a professional actor.

On Monday 2 January 2023 Cox appeared as a guest on BBC Radio Merseyside's Chinese programme 'Orient Express', in which he talked about his career and announced that he is working on a book about his life and his work.

== Discography ==
=== Singles ===
Year	English title	Chinese title	Notes
2008	"Feel The Love"	(feat. Ayi Jihu and Concept)	

== TV series ==
- 2014: ICAC Investigators
- 2014 como Dallas (Ep.4)
- 2014: The Ultimate Addiction como Antonio Cruz
- 2015: Eye in the Sky como Hung Chun-ying
