= Arthur Justice =

Australian RL coach and former Australia international rugby league footballer

Snowy Justice

Personal information
- Full name: Arthur James Justice
- Born: 8 December 1902 Hurstville, New South Wales
- Died: 16 December 1977 (aged 75) Kogarah, New South Wales

Playing information
- Position: Hooker
Club
Years	Team	Pld	T	G	FG	P
1922–32	St George	111	12	0	0	36
Representative
Years	Team	Pld	T	G	FG	P
1925–30	New South Wales	25	0	0	0	0
1928–30	Australia	5	1	0	0	3

Coaching information
Club
Years	Team	Gms	W	D	L	W%
1936	St George	13	3	0	10	23
1947	St George	19	11	0	8	58
	Total	32	14	0	18	44

Arthur James "Snowy" Justice (1902–1977) was an Australian rugby league footballer, coach and administrator. He was a rugged hooker for the St George Dragons who made state and national representative appearances in the late 1920s. Later he was a club administrator, national selector and league judiciary chairman.

== Club career ==
Justice seated 2nd row centre in Saints' 1930 side

A pioneer player with the St George Dragons, he made his first grade debut in the club's second season in the NSWRFL. He captained the club in their maiden (and unsuccessful) Grand final appearance in season 1930 against the Western Suburbs Magpies. This was the first ever Grand Final played to determine the premiership winner. In season 1932 when his Kangaroo tourist partner Harry Kadwell was captain-coach at St George, Justice took over the captaincy when Kadwell's season was ended with a broken leg.

== Representative career ==
An uncompromising player and relentless fighter Justice first represented for New South Wales in 1925 and went on to make a total of 25 appearances for his state.

Justice made his Test debut for Australia in the first match of Ashes series against England in 1928 and played in all three Tests of that series. He made further Test appearances on the 1929–30 Kangaroo tour of Great Britain – the scoreless draw in the third test and the subsequent fourth test, as well as appearing in a tour match against Wales. Arthur Justice is listed on the Australian Players Register as Kangaroo No. 139.

Justice, St.George vice captain 1927

== Post playing, administrative career and accolades ==
Justice coached the St. George Dragons in two seasons 1936 and 1947. He was an Australian representative selector for the 1952-53 Kangaroos and was chairman of the NSWRFL judiciary. He was also instrumental in enticing Frank Facer to St.George in 1947.

He then enjoyed a long career as Secretary-Manager of the St George Leagues Club initially at the club's first premises at the head of Rocky Point Road, Kogarah and then from 1963 when the current Leagues Club was opened on the Princes Highway at Carlton up until his death.

He was awarded Life Membership of the St. George Dragons club in 1944.

Together with the Balmain administrator Latchem Robinson, Justice's former representative playing peer, he was one of the seminal forces behind the establishment of the Club Managers' Association of Australia at its foundation in 1964. Justice was awarded a Life Membership of that organisation for outstanding service to the club industry.

== Death ==
Arthur Justice died on 16 December 1977 aged 75.
