= Ted Walton =

Australian rugby league footballer

Personal information
- Full name: Edward Walton
- Born: 22 December 1948 (age 76) Sydney, New South Wales, Australia

Playing information
- Position: Lock
Club
Years	Team	Pld	T	G	FG	P
1970–72	St. George	14	3	0	0	9
1973	Western Suburbs	1	0	0	0	0
	Total	15	3	0	0	9
- Source: Whiticker/Hudson

Edward 'Ted' Walton (born 1949) is an Australian former rugby league footballer who played in the 1970s in Sydney's NSWRFL competition.

== Playing career ==
Walton was a St. George lock forward who was graded in 1969. He went on to play three seasons of first grade with the Dragons between 1970 and 1972. His peak year was 1971, when he was promoted from reserve grade by coach Jack Gibson to feature in the 1971 Grand Final and scored a try in that match.

He joined Western Suburbs for one full season in 1973. Walton retired from first grade league in early 1974 after receiving a serious head injury in a trial match.
