= St. George Dragons =

Australian rugby league club, based in Sydney, NSW that folded in 1998

Club information
- Full name: St. George District Rugby League Football Club
- Founded: 13 October 1920; 106 years ago

Current details
- Competition: NSWRL, ARL

Records
- Premierships: 15 (1941, 1949, 1956, 1957, 1958, 1959, 1960, 1961, 1962, 1963, 1964, 1965, 1966, 1977, 1979)
- Runners-up: 12 (1927, 1930, 1933, 1942, 1946, 1953, 1971, 1975, 1985, 1992, 1993, 1996)
- Minor premierships: 15 (1928, 1946, 1956, 1957, 1958, 1959, 1960, 1962, 1963, 1964, 1965, 1966, 1967, 1979, 1985)
- NSW Cup: 6 (1938, 1962, 1963, 1964, 1976, 1985)
- Wooden spoons: 3 (1922, 1926, 1938)
- Most capped: 256 – Norm Provan
- Highest points scorer: 1,554 – Graeme Langlands

The St. George Dragons are an Australian rugby league football club from the St George District in Sydney, New South Wales that played in the top level New South Wales competition and Australian Rugby League competitions from the 1921 until the 1997 ARL season, as well as the unified 1998 National Rugby League season. On 23 September 1998, the club formed a joint venture with the Illawarra Steelers, creating the St. George Illawarra Dragons team which competed in the 1999 NRL season and continues to compete in the league today. As a stand-alone club, it fields teams in the NSWRL underage men's and women's competitions, Harold Matthews Cup, S.G. Ball, Lisa Fiaola Cup, and Tarsha Gale Cup.

Entering the New South Wales Rugby Football League in 1921, the St George club won 15 premierships including 11 in succession between 1956 and 1966, still an equal current world record for sporting competitions (shared with Bayern Munich). The Dragons are third in terms of total premierships won in the NSW Rugby Football League. Following the Super League war and formation of the NRL in 1998, the club still remains in a joint venture with the Illawarra Steelers known as the St. George Illawarra Dragons.

== History ==
=== Formative years ===
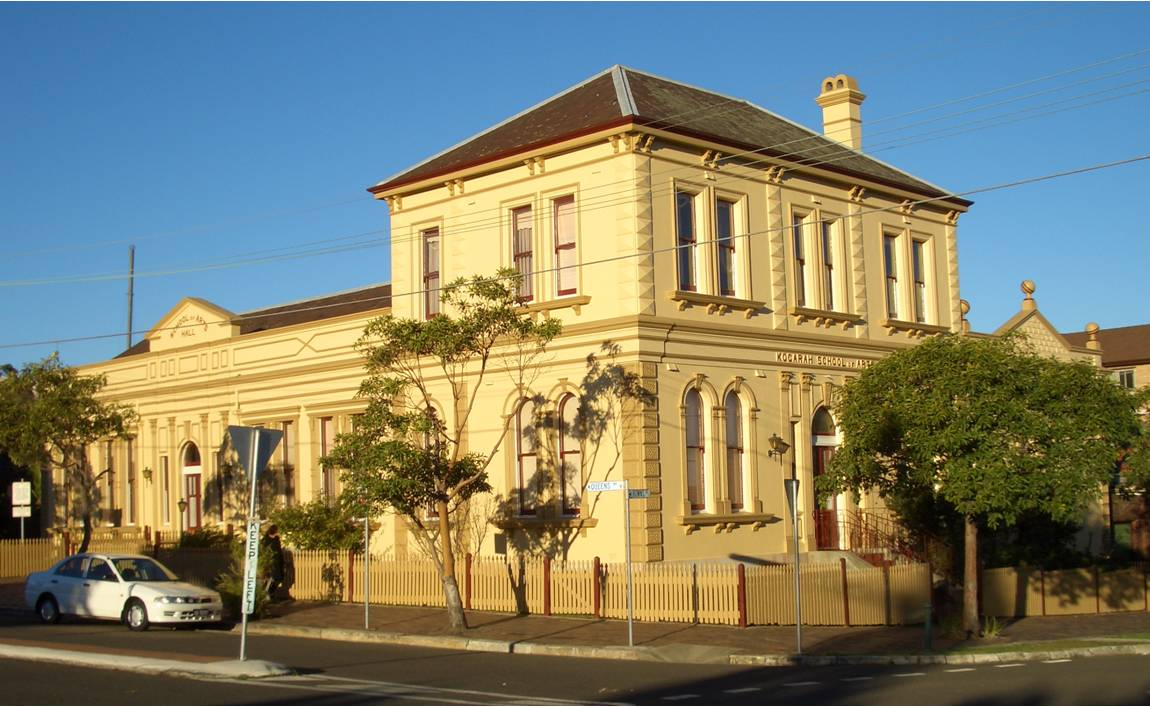
Kogarah School of the Arts where the club was formed in 1921

==== 1908: formation attempts and early matches ====
On Friday, 28 February 1908, at Rockdale Town Hall, a meeting mainly instigated by St George rugby league pioneers, W. Munn and Joe McGraw, was attended by officials of the recently formed New South Wales Rugby Football League and rugby players from the local district. NSWRFL president Henry Hoyle gave a convincing address and a St. George club appeared likely to form, However, the club's application was later rejected due to an insufficient number of players. Undeterred, the St George Rugby League Football Club took form in 1910 when a team played in the NSWRL 3rd Grade Competition. The club's first game took place against Newtown at Sans Souci and St George were victorious 36–0.

==== 1921: foundation of St George District Rugby League Club ====
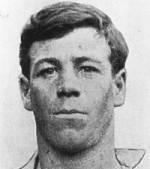
Herb Gilbert

With the demise of Annandale Rugby League Club, St George was successful in November 1920 in petitioning the NSWRL for promotion. In February 1921, at the Kogarah School of Arts, the St George District Rugby League Club was founded. The first president was Arthur Yager, with Joe McGraw chosen as secretary, Arthur Moymow named treasurer and Allan Clark as the first club delegate to the NSWRFL. Baden Wales was delegate to the Juniors.

The club's inaugural captain was Dual-code rugby international, Herb Gilbert who joined the club at aged 33 as captain-coach.

The club's inaugural first grade appearance was on St George's Day, 23 April 1921 against Glebe at the Sydney Sports Ground. The first St George team to take the field was: Lyall Wall, Norm Shadlow, Reg Fusedale, Herb Gilbert (c), George Carstairs, Frank Gray, Tommy Burns, Tony Redmond, Clarrie Tye, Sid Field, Roy Bossi, Ernie Lapham and Jack Clark. Glebe won the encounter 4–3. St George won only two matches in their first season and finished equal second last in the premiership.

Before the start of the 1921 season, trial matches were played at Sans Souci and training took place at the Drill Hall in the Sydney suburb of Arncliffe. During the 1921 season games were played at Hurstville Oval. In 1925 the club started using Earl Park at Arncliffe as its headquarters and home ground. The club played at Earl Park until the end of the 1939 season.

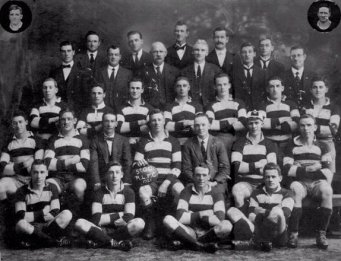
St George 1921

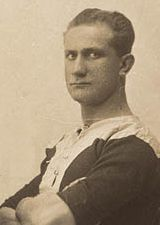
Frank Burge

The new club struggled during the 1920s finishing last in 1926 and eight points behind the next placed team. The hiring of another 33-year-old veteran leader in Frank Burge saw a change in the club's fortunes. In 1927 under Burge, the "Dragon Slayers", as they were then known, qualified for their first final but were beaten by South Sydney. For each of the next three seasons the Dragons qualified for the semifinals and in 1930 they beat Wests in the final, only to suffer a return loss when Wests exercised their prerogative of the time as minor premiers to request a Grand final challenge rematch.

=== 1930s ===
Harry Kadwell

Arthur "Snowy" Justice

Harry Kadwell, the former South Sydney player and international half-back took over from Burge as captain-coach in 1931 and had four seasons with the club before his retirement. His leadership partner was the uncompromising hooker Arthur "Snowy" Justice who had been a Kangaroo tourist alongside Kadwell in 1929–30 and who took over as captain when Kadwell's 1932 season was ended with a broken leg. Justice would play eleven seasons with the club, followed by a long post-playing career with as football club secretary and league's club secretary-manager through till the early 1970s.

In 1933, St George sneaked into the semifinals in fourth place and won their way into the final against minor premiers Newtown. They lost 18–5. That same year they won the first night competition conducted by the NSWRL, a six-club competition played on three Saturday nights at the Sydney Showground.

In 1935, St George defeated Canterbury-Bankstown 91–6, the biggest win in their history and still the biggest winning margin ever in the history of the League; every player scored during this match. In 1937 for the fourth time in the club's short history, the Dragon Slayers finished as competition runners-up. Their inaugural premiership had still not been achieved when at the end of the decade, following the 1939 season, the club moved its home ground back to Hurstville Oval. Former lord mayor of Sydney, Jack Mostyn became president of the club in 1937 and retained the role for the next eight years. In 1938, Clarrie Fahy became St. George's third secretary after the retirement of Reg Fusedale. Fahy remained as club secretary until 1944.

=== 1940s ===
The long wait finally ended in 1941 when St George defeated Eastern Suburbs 31–14 at the Sydney Cricket Ground to take their inaugural First Grade premiership. They were captain-coached by Neville Smith. Brothers Jack and Herb Gilbert Jr., the sons of the club's first captain-coach Herb Gilbert both played in the match. The following year, 1942 all three grades reached the Grand final with the 3rd-grade side victorious. The first-grade side had routed Canterbury-Bankstown, the minor premiers, in a semi-final and then beat Easts in the final but as had happened in 1930, Canterbury exercised their right as minor premiers to issue a challenge and beat Saints in a Grand final. For season 1945, St. George obtained the services of a south sea islander called Walter Mussing. A prolific try scorer, Mussing was the top try scorer for the club in 1945 and was a crowd favourite for three seasons.

St George captained by Herb Narvo and starring the backline brothers Jack and Ray Lindwall were runners up again in 1946 losing to Balmain 12–13. Ray Lindwall missed four conversion attempts that day.

During the famous tour by the 1946 Great Britain team, Frank Whitcombe's performances on tour attracted the attention of St. George. Club official Jack Mogridge offered Whitcombe a two-year contract at £600 per season as player-coach plus costs of transport and a lucrative job, (based on increases in average earnings, this would be approximately £59,340 in 2016). Whitcombe signed the two-year contract with St George, however on his return to Bradford the family decided to stay in Yorkshire.

In the 1949 NSWRFL season they were premiers for the second time, beating South Sydney 19–12 in a spirited win. They were captained by the Test five-eighth Johnny Hawke with Frank Facer as Vice Captain and contained a champion backline including Noel Pidding, Doug McRitchie, Matt McCoy and Ron Roberts.The Dragons had lost form in the back-end of the season but came home strongly beating minor premiers South Sydney in the semi, and Balmain in a final before meeting Souths again in the Grand final.

Some first grade players killed in World War 2 include Jack Lennox, Len Brennan, Jack Simpson and Spencer Walklate.

=== 1950s ===
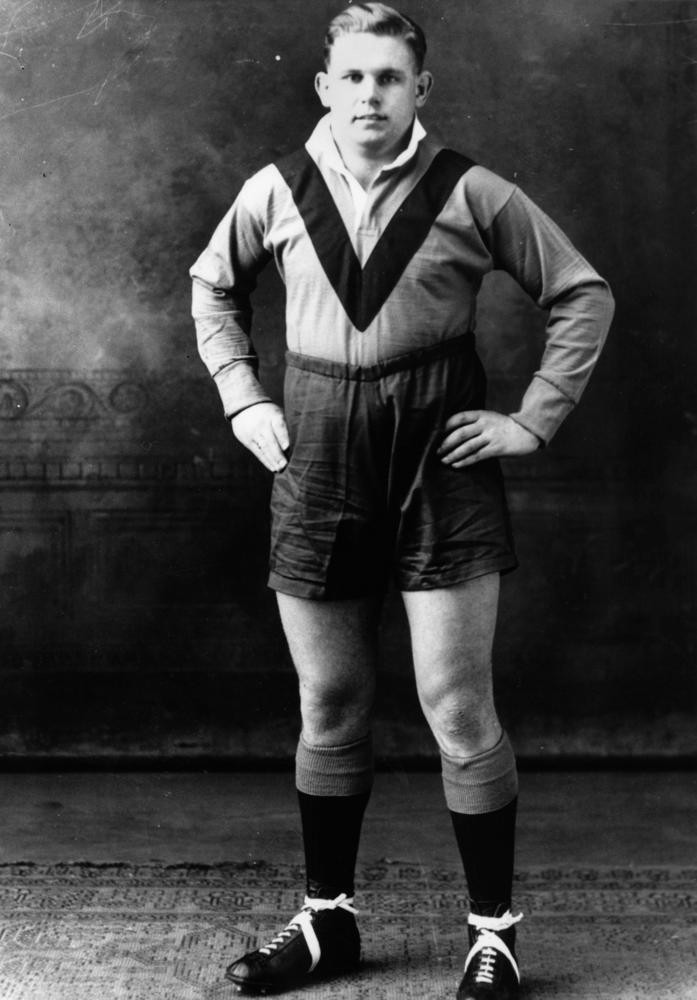
Harry Bath

The St George Football Club came of age in the 1950s. A move from Hurstville Oval to Kogarah Oval saw St George take on Souths before a crowd of 12,500 fans in their inaugural match at the ground. Due to its close proximity to Kogarah Oval, the Carlton Hotel became the local watering hole for the players after training.

In 1953 the first St George Leagues Club was built on the corner of Princes Highway & Rocky Point Road. The building later became a high school, although the building was demolished in July 2015. This club was to become the site of many victory celebrations over the next 10 years. In 1956 St George began their reign as Premiers, beating Balmain 18–12 in the decider. In the following year, they won in First grade, 3rd Grade and the President's Cup while being runners-up in Reserve grade. Their dominance had commenced and would last until 1966, covering an unprecedented 11 victories. In the early years players such as Kearney, Wilson, Clay, Provan, Lumsden and Bath forged the club's success. In 1959 they went through the season undefeated amassing 550 points (205 scored by Harry Bath) compared to their rivals total tally against them of just 90 points. That year the brilliant young lock Johnny Raper made his grand final debut at centre replacing the injured Reg Gasnier.

The writers Collis & Whitaker, Larry Writer and Heads & Middleton have all attributed the reign of success to three key factors:,

1. Club administration – the run began the same year that Frank Facer came to power as the football club secretary. Facer had an eye for talent, was a shrewd negotiator and along with President Len Kelly and directors Alex Mackie, Glynn Price and Laurie Doust, the leadership group planned their recruitment policy to cover team gaps well ahead of time and worked to maintain an attractive family atmosphere and an environment that fostered success.
2. Club funds – the successful Leagues Club generated revenue from poker machines and liquor sales and enabled funds to be poured into local talent development but also enabled star local and overseas players to be lured to the club to share in its success.
3. Mastering the art of unlimited tackle football – firstly Ken Kearney and then Harry Bath came to the club after successful careers in English rugby league and brought with them the disciplines of resolute defence, superior ball skills and an uncompromising commitment to fitness. The Dragons' stone-wall defence and controlled and punishing forward play became renowned and resulted in statistics such as the 1959 side remaining unbeaten throughout the season (snatching 19 wins and a draw against Western Suburbs); being undefeated at their Jubilee Oval home ground in twelve seasons from 1954 to end 1965; while in the total eleven premiership deciding Grand finals played, the Dragons conceded just five tries.

=== 1960s ===
Chart of yearly table positions for St. George Dragons in First Grade Rugby League

By the early 1960s St George players were afforded movie star status in Sydney and names such as Reg Gasnier and Johnny Raper were highly familiar as were later those of Graeme Langlands, Billy Smith and Johnny King.

1963 was a particularly notable year for the club. A new Leagues Club was opened on the Princes Highway at Carlton, and would become the hub of social life in the district and dubbed "the Taj Mahal". On the afternoon of 24 August 1963 Saints won the Grand Final in all three grades (First Grade 8–3 v Wests; Reserves 3-2 v Souths; 3rd Grade 12–2 v Canterbury) – this feat has not been achieved since. That same day saw the creation of an iconic image when Sydney Morning Herald photographer John O'Gready captured a photo which would become titled "The Gladiators" and which showed the essence of good sportsmanship as the Saints' captain Norm Provan and West's captain Arthur Summons embraced post-match in exhausted camaraderie while barely recognisable, covered head-to-toe in mud. Reserve try scorer was R O'Loughlin.

In 1965 another record was set when a crowd of 78,056 football supporters packed the SCG to see the Dragons triumph over Souths, and the tally reached ten consecutive premierships in Norm Provan's farewell match. Provan wrote the introduction to the Haddan book "The Finals – 100 Years" and reflected upon the dressing room mood before the match:

It's 1965, St George and Souths in the grand final at the Sydney Cricket Ground. It's five minutes before we walk out. The boys are sitting around, very quiet now, just thinking about their own games. I have finished my last 10-minute talk to the team, just a summary of our general plan – no shouting or yelling or 'geeing' up. These players just don't need that. I have this terrible sick feeling in my gut. We have to lose a grand final sooner or later. The law of averages demands it. This one would make it 10. A nice round figure and I can retire happy. The linesman comes to the door, looks at me and nods. I nod back. We all stand up. The sick feeling is gone. 'Let's give it another go!'.

— Haddan, Introduction px, ""

The team achieved their 11th successive premiership on 18 September 1966, when under their captain, Ian Walsh, they beat Balmain 23–4..This run came to an end in 1967, which saw the retirement of Reg Gasnier and the implementation of the limited tackle rule, replacing the unlimited tackles rule of 1908. St. George were knocked out of the 1967 preliminary final by Canterbury-Bankstown. South Sydney won the 1967 premiership and appeared in five successive grand finals between 1967 and 1971, winning four.

=== 1970s ===
While shaded by the spectacular success of the previous decade, the Dragons remained competitive throughout most of the 1970s winning premierships in 1977 and 1979, being runner-up Grand Finalists in 1971 and 1975 and finishing the regular season in 3rd place or better in all years excepting 1974 and 1978. In the late 60s and into the early 70s St George got their best value out of Billy Smith and Graeme Langlands after all the other stars of the long reign had gone. It was largely due to their combined class and the apparent on-field intuitive understanding of each other's kicking and positional game that the club showed consistency of form through to the mid-1970s.

During 1970, St George became the first club in any code of Football to provide three Kangaroo Captains in the same season in Graeme Langlands, Billy Smith and rugby-union convert Phil Hawthorne. Other stars in the early 1970s were Barry Beath, Ken Maddison, Rod Reddy, Steve Edge and Ted Goodwin.

In 1971 St George made it through to the Grand final against an experienced Souths side with a battle-hardened pack. Saints were the underdogs but looked well-positioned when the half-time score was 1–0. Souths then raced ahead in the second half to 11–0 lead. The Dragons fought back with tries to Barry Beath and Ted Walton, while Langlands converted both including a magnificent sideline kick giving the Saints fans great hope of an upset. However a match-winning try from Souths' Bob McCarthy showed the experience of the Rabbitohs and South Sydney took their fourth title in a five-year period.

A year of injuries in 1974 saw St George win only ten of the season's twenty-two matches and miss the semi-finals for the first time in 23 years. In 1975 Langlands wore white boots, novel at the time, in the Grand final against Easts. Langlands had problems with a groin injury and, partially because he battled-on relying strongly on painkillers, St George was defeated 38–0. This was a record loss in a Grand Final until 2008 when Manly-Warringah Sea Eagles defeated Melbourne Storm 40–0 however that was accumulated on the four-point try system. The 1975 score on that basis would be 46-0.

In the latter half of the decade Steve Edge, Rocket Reddy, Steve Morris, Mark Shulman, Robert Stone, Bruce Starkey, John Jansen and Craig Young provided the playing leadership at the club. In 1977, enjoying a resurgence under new coach Harry Bath, St George met Parramatta in a thrilling Grand Final, which went into 20 minutes of extra time. Reddy ever the enforcer in his career, had played a brutal defensive first half resulting in post-match comments that Parramatta's Ray Price finished the game looking like he'd been used as a punching bag. Reddy's questionable tactics, targeting Price and Higgs in the 2nd half saw a number of penalties with successful goal results go Parramatta's way. A try with ten minutes to run saw the Eels tie up the match and in spite of missed goal attempts by both kickers and some desperate field-goal shots from the Dragons, the match finished at 9–9 with tension high amongst players, officials and supporters. It was the first time Australian rugby league had experienced a drawn Grand final and a rematch was scheduled for the next week. In the rematch St George proved too strong, defeating Parramatta 22–0. It was a fitting farewell for the stalwart Dragons second rower Barry Beath, the last Dragon to retire who'd been involved as a player in the eleven-year run. Beath is credited with the unusual statistic of winning a premiership in his first season (1966) and his last (1977), but none in ten seasons between.

Administratively, 1977 was the Saints' best-ever year financially. The crowd average was over 19,000 enabling funds for Kogarah Oval to be updated. The following year Frank Facer, the football club secretary who had masterminded the successes of the 1950s and 1960s, died of cancer. It was Facer who brought Harry Bath back to the club in 1977. Bath had coached Balmain and Newtown and had success as the national coach and Facer's masterstroke in bringing Bath back into the Dragons' fold paid off, enabling the old campaigner "Fearless Frank" to see one last premiership victory before his death.

In the 1979 season, still under Bath, Saints got back into the swing of things and won the Grand Final against Canterbury 17–13. By now Edge and Young were experienced leaders and Reddy, as he'd done in the 1st 1977 Grand final, came into his own in the 1979 decider punishing the opposition forwards with his ruthless defence. As it turned out this would be the last premiership St George would win in first grade before the merger in 1999.

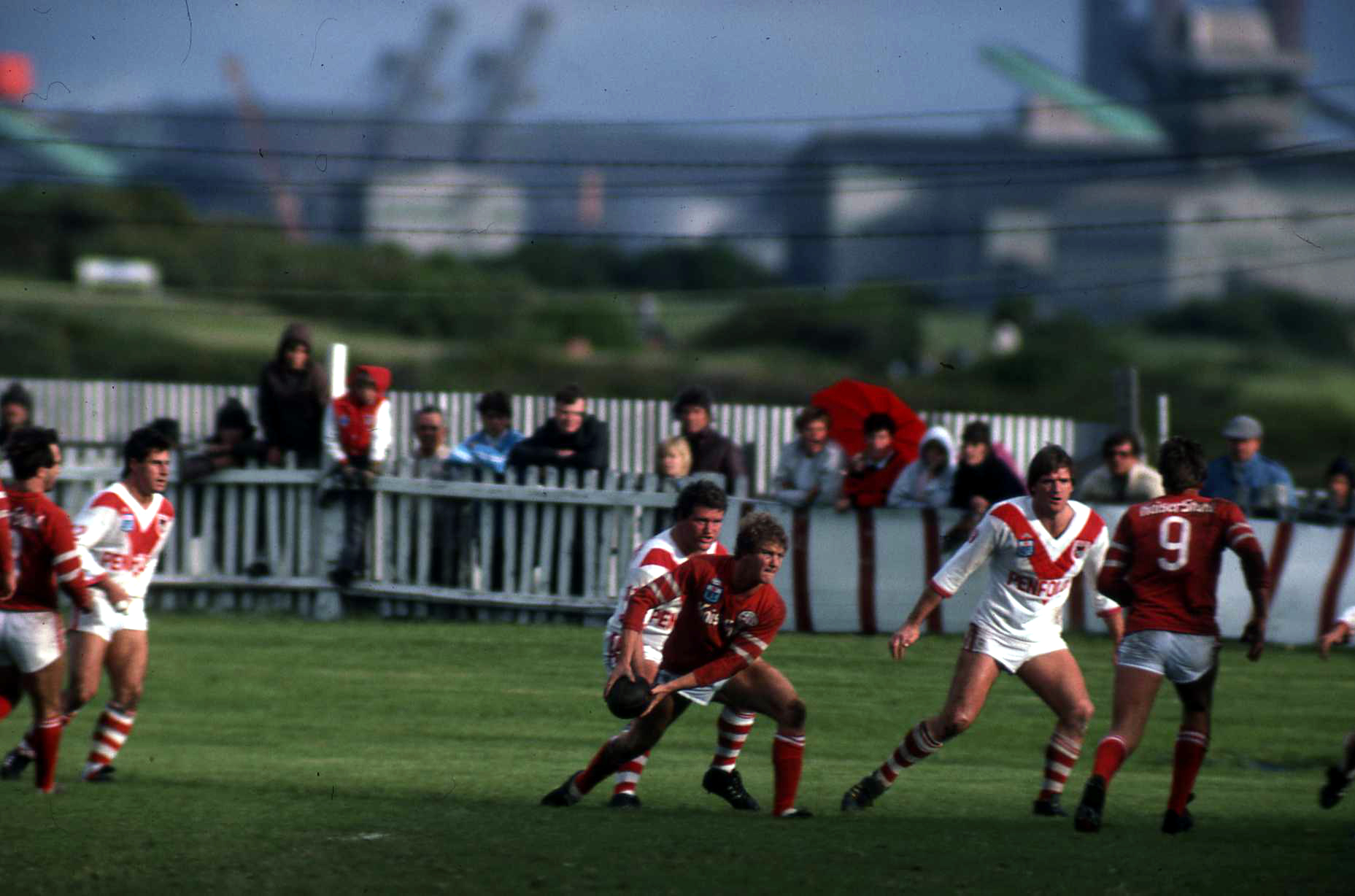
Illawarra Steelers v St George Dragons

=== 1980s ===
Harry Bath coached the 1980 and 1981 seasons, then from 1982 to 1987 the Dragons were coached by the articulate and tactically brilliant Roy Masters. Though he had not himself played the game at the top level he had a keen interest in team psychology and had achieved excellent results at Wests from 1978–81 and helped that struggling club to produce consistent on-field results. Under Masters, in 1985 St George were minor-premiers, runaway club champions and made it to the Grand final in all three Grades. After winning both the lower grades, the Dragons first grade team were beaten by Canterbury 7–6. At the end of this year, plans to build a new stand were deferred. A decision to move from Kogarah to the SCG had supporters and even some officials disheartened.

In 1986, with the SCG as their new home ground, St George missed the semi-finals in all three grades for the first time in 50 years. A decision was made at the end of 1987 to move St George from the SCG to the Belmore Sports Ground in 1988 with the hope of returning to Jubilee Oval Kogarah at a later stage.

Ted Glossop coached for a single season in 1988, tasting success when the Dragons won the mid-week 1988 Panasonic Cup competition. In front of 22,000 spectators at Parramatta Stadium, with millions more watching the game on television, the Dragons defeated the Balmain Tigers 16–8 with prizemoney totalling $150,000. Tries were scored by Ricky Walford, Steve Robinson and an unforgettable intercept try by Bert Gordon that "brought the house down". Later, lock forward Peter Gill was awarded the Panasonic Cup Player of the Series for 1988.

In 1989, former premiership winning captain Craig Young had two seasons at the helm (1989 & 1990) but left under unhappy circumstances. In 1989, Saints appointed former player Geoff Carr as secretary of club and also returned home to upgraded facilities at Kogarah Jubilee Oval but the season would end and along with it the first decade since the 1930s in which the club failed to win a premiership.

=== 1990s ===
The '90s saw St George on a roller-coaster ride. Between 1991 and 1995, St George played one home game per year at the Adelaide Oval in South Australia in a deal with longtime major sponsor, the Adelaide based Penfolds Winery. The first game in the "City of Churches" in 1991 saw the Dragons defeat Balmain 16-2 in front of 28,884 fans which was in fact the NSWRL's highest non-finals attendance for the season. Saints would go on to host Brisbane (1992, L 18-20), Canberra (1993, L 2-30), Wests (1994, W 32-16), and finally Newcastle (1995, L 13-24). In total the Dragons attracted 89,883 fans to their five home games in Adelaide. St. George would play one more game in Adelaide when they played the short-lived Adelaide Rams at the famous oval in 1998, losing a close encounter 20-22 in front of 8,506 fans. In a podcast with former NRL star Denan Kemp in 2023, former St George forward Gorden Tallis revealed the club almost moved to Adelaide in 1996 at the height of the Super League war to maintain their sponsorship with Penfolds and play as the St George Adelaide Dragons.

Saints made the Grand Final in 1992, 1993 and 1996, but were unable to win the premiership. In 1992 and 1993, coached by the former Illawarra Steelers coach Brian Smith, the Dragons met the Brisbane Broncos in successive deciders. On the first occasion St George were captained by centre Michael Beattie, but Brisbane was too classy, running away with the game in the 2nd half to win 28–8, including a 95-metre try to Broncos centre Steve Renouf in which he just outpaced Ricky Walford to score.

Twelve months later in 1993, there were high expectations for the Dragons having comfortably accounted for Canberra 31–10 and Canterbury 27–12 in the semi-finals, and with the Broncos having scraped into the finals in fifth place. The sides for the grand final replay were largely unchanged between the two years. Only one Bronco (Peter Ryan), and four of the Dragons (Jason Stevens, Nathan Brown, Gorden Tallis and Phil Blake) had not played in the 1992 Grand Final. Prop forward Steven's game turned sour in only the second tackle of the game when he suffered a thumb injury that required him leaving the field and being taken to hospital for surgery. Brisbane withstood an early Dragons barrage which brought much hope but no points. Then two tries to Brisbane sent them to the break with a 10–2. Saints winger Ian "Chook" Herron kept the Dragons in touch with three penalty goals to make it 10–6, but the title stayed north of the border when Broncos winger Willie Carne scored two minutes from full-time.

In 1995, after exploring the possibility of a merger with the Roosters in an attempt to match the turnover of the all-conquering Brisbane Broncos, chief executive Geoff Carr was sacked by his board.

St George played in their last Grand Final as a single club when they faced off against Manly-Warringah in the 1996 decider, with the Sea Eagles winning 20-8 in front of 40,985 fans at the Sydney Football Stadium. The David Waite coached Dragons had finished the season in 7th position and won their way through to the Grand Final with wins over Canberra (16-14), Sydney City (36-16), and North Sydney (29-12) in the semi-finals. St George's last Grand Final captain was Queensland State of Origin and Australian test centre Mark Coyne.

The Dragons' first points of the Grand Final came in the 37th minute when Wayne Bartrim kicked a penalty awarded after Manly forward Owen Cunningham was penalised for stripping the ball. From the ensuing kick-off just before half-time came the game's controversial moment and a hotly disputed try. Manly fullback Matthew Ridge made a spectacular short kick-off and regathered, catching the Dragons unaware. St George hooker Nathan Brown appeared to tackle Ridge, albeit one-handedly and by the collar. Ridge got up and ran when Brown and the rest of the Dragons were expecting him to stop and play the ball. Referee David Manson ruled that Brown had not completed the tackle. This caught the Dragons napping and Ridge was eventually tackled just a few metres from the line. Manly back-rower Steve Menzies then broke his way through Saints' defence to score next to the posts, giving Ridge an easy conversion kick. The controversial ruling by referee Manson gave Manly a 14–2 half time lead.

At the conclusion of the 1998 season, the formation of the competition's first joint venture team occurred when St George joint ventured with the Illawarra Steelers to form the St George Illawarra Dragons.

=== Post joint-venture ===
The joint venture first fielded a side in the NRL competition in 1999 and reached the Grand final that year. They would later win its first premiership as a joint venture in 2010, and in 2018 a women's side operating under the same club name was formed ahead of the inaugural NRL Women's Premiership commencing the same year.

St. George fielded a NSW Cup team from 1921-2000, before forming a St. George Illawarra side which lasted from 2001 to 2007. The Dragons still field stand alone sides in the SG Ball and Harold Matthews competitions, last winning an SG Ball title in 1992 and have yet to taste premiership success in the under 16s Harold Mathews Cup. In 2018, the Dragons entered the Tarsha Gale Cup, a women's Under 18's competition, for the first time.

== Records ==
=== Club ===
- Biggest wins: St George def. Canterbury 91–6 at Earl Park, 11 May 1935 (Premiership record)
- Worst defeat: Manly def. St George 61–0 at Brookvale Oval 3 July 1994
- Longest winning streak: 12 matches from 6 June 1958 – 24, May 1959 (St George went through the 1959 season undefeated, however they drew one game. During this period, the Saints played 23 matches without loss)
- Longest Losing Streak: 8 matches from 3 July – 28 August 1926
- Largest Home Crowd: 23,582 v South Sydney Rabbitohs at Kogarah Jubilee Oval 4 May 1975

=== Individual ===
- Most Tries in a Match: 6 by Jack Lindwall v Manly-Warringah at Hurstville Oval on 3 May 1947
- Most Goals in a Match: 15 by Les Griffin v Canterbury-Bankston at Earl Park on 11 May 1935
- Most Points in a Match: 36 by:
  - Les Griffin (2 tries, 15 goals) v Canterbury-Bankstown at Earl Park, Arncliffe on 11 May 1935
  - Jack Lindwall (6 tries, 9 goals) v Manly-Warringah at Hurstville Oval on 3 May 1947
- Most Tries in a Season: 26 by Tommy Ryan in NSWRFL season 1957
- Most Goals in a Season: 108 by Harry Bath in NSWRFL season 1958
- Most Points in a Season: 225 (3 tries, 108 goals) by Harry Bath in NSWRFL season 1958
- Most Goals in Club History: 648 by Graeme Langlands from 1963 to 1976

=== Most First Grade Games ===
- 256, Norm Provan (1951–1965)
- 234, Billy Smith (1963–1977)
- 234, Craig Young (1977–1988)
- 227, Graeme Langlands (1963–1976)
- 211, Michael Beattie (1980–1992)
- 207, Ricky Walford (1985–1996)
- 207, Mark Coyne (1989–1998)
- 204, Rod Reddy (1972–1983)
- 199, Graeme Wynn (1979–1990)
- 191, Johnny King (1960–1971)

=== Most Tries for Club ===
- 143, Johnny King (1960–1971)
- 136, Eddie Lumsden (1957–1966)
- 127, Reg Gasnier (1959–1967)
- 110, Jack Lindwall (1938–1949)
- 104, Ricky Walford (1985–1996)
- 102, Steve Morris (1979–1986)
- 86, Graeme Langlands (1963–1976)
- 79, Tommy Ryan (1951–1953, 1955–1958)
- 65, Rod Reddy (1972–1983)
- 64, Norm Provan (1951–1965)

=== Most Points for Club ===
- 1,554 (86 tries, 648 goals), Graeme Langlands (1963–1976)
- 874 (104 tries, 229 goals), Ricky Walford (1985–1996)
- 634 (20 tries, 287 goals), Brian Graham (1955–1964)
- 598 (34 tries, 248 goals), Noel Pidding (1947–1953)
- 596 (12 tries, 278 goals, 2 field goals), Doug Fleming (1949–1957)
- 560 (19 tries, 242 goals), Wayne Bartrim (1995–1998)

== Players of note ==
=== Australian Rugby League's Team of the Century ===
- Frank Burge (1927)
- Norm Provan (1951–1965)
- Reg Gasnier (1959–1967)
- Johnny Raper (1959–1969)
- Graeme Langlands (1963–1976)

=== Australian Rugby League's 100 greatest players ===
- Harry Bath
- Frank Burge
- Brian Clay
- Ken Kearney
- Johnny King
- Eddie Lumsden
- Herb Narvo
- Billy Smith
- Ian Walsh

=== Internationals while at St George ===
- Wayne Bartrim
- Barry Beath
- Tony Branson
- Bob Bugden
- George Carstairs
- Brian Clay
- Mark Coyne
- Percy Fairall
- Wally Fullerton Smith
- Fred Gardner
- Reg Gasnier
- Ted Goodwin
- Scott Gourley
- Norman Hawke
- Phil Hawthorne
- Jack Holland
- Pat Jarvis
- Albert "Rick" Johnston
- Brian Johnston
- Arthur Justice
- Ken Kearney
- Johnny King
- Ross Kite
- Graeme Langlands
- Eddie Lumsden
- Brad Mackay
- Steve Morris
- Noel Mulligan
- Matt McCoy
- Doug McRitchie
- Kevin O'Brien
- Michael O'Connor
- Bryan Orrock
- Noel Pidding
- Norm Provan
- Graham Quinn
- Johnny Raper
- Elton Rasmussen
- Rod Reddy
- Johnny Riley
- Ron Roberts
- Kevin Ryan
- Tommy Ryan
- Billy Smith
- Ian Walsh
- Billy Wilson
- John Wittenberg
- Graeme Wynn
- Craig Young

== Coaching register ==
No.	Name	Years	G	W	L	D	%	Premierships	Runners-up	Minor Premierships	Wooden spoons
1	Herb Gilbert	1921–1924	48	12	34	2	25%	—	—	—	1922
2	Frank Burge	1927–1930, 1937	76	51	20	5	67%	—	1927, 1930	1928	—
3	Harry Kadwell	1931–1932	29	12	16	1	41%	—	—	—	—
4	Albert Johnston	1933–1935	47	26	21	0	55%	—	1933	—	—
5	Arthur Justice	1936, 1947	32	14	18	0	44%	—	—	—	—
6	Eddie Root	1936	13	3	10	0	23%	—	—	—	—
7	Peter Burge	1937	8	5	2	1	63%	—	—	—	—
8	Norm Pope	1938	14	3	10	1	21%	—	—	—	1938
9	Neville Smith	1939–1941, 1943	62	36	22	4	58%	1941	—	—	—
10	Len Kelly	1942	17	11	6	0	65%	—	1942	—	—
11	Bill Kelly	1944	15	9	6	0	60%	—	—	—	—
12	Percy Williams	1945	14	4	9	1	29%	—	—	—	—
13	Herb Narvo	1946	16	11	5	0	69%	—	1946	1946	—
14	Charlie Lynch	1947	19	11	8	0	58%	—	—	—	—
15	Doug McRitchie	1947	19	11	8	0	58%	—	—	—	—
16	Jim Duckworth	1948–1950	59	34	20	5	58%	1949	—	—	—
17	Johnny Hawke	1951–1952	39	24	14	1	62%	—	—	—	—
18	Norm Tipping	1953, 1956	40	27	12	1	68%	1956	—	1956	—
19	Ken Kearney	1954–1955, 1957–1961	141	113	26	2	80%	1957, 1958, 1959, 1960, 1961	—	1957, 1958, 1959, 1960	—
20	Norm Provan	1962–1965, 1968	105	80	20	5	76%	1962, 1963, 1964, 1965	—	1962, 1963, 1964, 1965	—
21	Ian Walsh	1966–1967	45	31	12	2	69%	1966	—	1966, 1967	—
22	Johnny Raper	1969	23	14	9	0	61%	—	—	—	—
23	Jack Gibson	1970–1971	49	33	15	1	67%	—	1971	—	—
24	Graeme Langlands	1972–1976	121	72	44	5	60%	—	1975	—	—
25	John Bailey	1976	1	0	1	0	0%	—	—	—	—
26	Harry Bath	1977–1981	118	71	42	5	60%	1977, 1979	—	1979	—
27	Roy Masters	1982–1987	162	91	63	8	56%	—	1985	1985	—
28	Ted Glossop	1988	22	9	13	0	41%	—	—	—	—
29	Craig Young	1989–1990	44	18	26	0	41%	—	—	—	—
30	Brian Smith	1991–1995	118	69	46	3	59%	—	1992, 1993	—	—
31	David Waite	1996–1998	72	37	32	3	51%	—	1996	—	—

== Stadium ==
St. George began their home-ground stadium at Hurstville Oval in 1921 until 1924. In 1925, they went to Earl Park, Arncliffe, where they remained until 1939. They returned to Hurstville in 1940, where they remained until 1949.

In 1950, the team moved to Kogarah Oval. They stayed at the venue until 1985. From 1986 until 1988 while the ground was being renovated, the Dragons moved to Sydney Cricket Ground (1986–1987) and to Belmore Oval (1988). In 1989, the team returned to Kogarah Oval where they remained until the joint-venture with the Illawarra Steelers at the end of the 1998 NRL season.

St. George's home game crowd record was in 1975, where a crowd of 23,582 attended the game against South Sydney at Kogarah Oval.

Presently, the St. George Dragons play the bulk of home games in the SG Ball and Harold Matthews competitions at WIN Jubilee Oval, and in recent years have also hosted games at Hurstville Oval.

== District Juniors ==
The St. George District JRL covers an area of southern Sydney from Cooks River and the M5 Motorway in the north, Botany Bay to the east, Salt Pan Creek to the west, and the Georges River to the south.

Current St. George junior clubs are:

- Renown United
- Arncliffe Scots
- Hurstville United
- Brighton Seagulls
- Riverwood Legion
- Earlwood Saints
- Penshurst RSL
- Kingsgrove Colts
- Kogarah Cougars

Defunct clubs:

- Peakhurst Inn
- Kingshead Cowboys
- ICC (Illawarra Catholic Club)
- Marist Brothers Kogarah
- De La Salle Kingsgrove
- Oatley RSL
- Lugarno
- The Grove
- Rockdale Bulls
- Peakhurst Hawks
- South Hurstville Diggers
- Sans Souci
- Hurstville Old Boys
- Ramsgate United
- Sutherland Grave Diggers (1935 prior to formation of Cronulla-Sutherland in 1967)
- Allawah
- Intersection Tavern
- Kyeemagh Stingrays
- St George Rowers
- Narwee Colts
- Riverwood United
- Bexley-Kingsgrove
- Bexley RSL

Notable NRL players who were St. George juniors:

- Len Kelly – Sutherland Grave Diggers
- Jack Lindwall – Marist Brothers Kogarah
- Reg Gasnier – Renown United
- Billy Smith – Renown United
- John Stathers – Renown United
- Mark Gasnier – Renown United
- Jason Nightingale – Renown United
- Daryl Millard – Renown United
- Anthony Mundine – Hurstville United
- Lance Thompson – Hurstville United
- Brad Mackay – Brighton Seagulls
- Jason Stevens – Brighton Seagulls
- Johnny King – Arncliffe Scots
- Matthew Dufty – Penshurst RSL
- Ross Kite – Arncliffe Scots
- Michael Beattie – Bexley-Kingsgrove
- Jeff Hardy – Brighton Seagulls
- Robert Stone – Marist Brothers Kogarah
- Ross Strudwick – Renown United
- Randall Barge – Brighton Seagulls
- Jacob Host – Renown United
- Arthur Justice – Club unknown
- Ray Lindwall – Marist Brothers Kogarah
- Percy Fairall - Ramsgate (later became Ramsgate United)
- Bruce Starkey – Arncliffe Scots
- Pat Jarvis – Arncliffe Scots
- Wes Naiqama – Arncliffe Scots
- Kevin Naiqama – Arncliffe Scots
- George Ndaira – Arncliffe Scots
- Chris Johns – Penshurst RSL
- Adam Peek – Peakhurst Hawks
- Joseph Leilua – Hurstville United
- Steve Edge – St George Rowers
- Tiger Black – Arncliffe Scots
- Luciano Leilua – Hurstville United
- Blake Ferguson – Earlwood Saints
- Josh Addo-Carr – Earlwood Saints
- Keith Galloway – Marist Brothers Kogarah
- Michael Sorridimi – Kingsgrove Colts
- Billy Wilson – club unknown
- Noel Goldthorpe – Kyeemagh Stingrays
- Mark Shulman – Ramsgate United

== Team of the century ==
On 20 July 2022, the St. George Dragons District Rugby League Club announced their team of the century.

Team Of the Century:

FB	1	Graeme Langlands
WG	2	Johnny King
CE	3	Reg Gasnier
CE	4	Mark Gasnier
WG	5	Eddie Lumsden
FE	6	Brian Clay
HB	7	Billy Smith
PR	8	Billy Wilson
HK	9	Ken Kearney
PR	10	Craig Young
SR	11	Norm Provan
SR	12	Rod Reddy
LK	13	Johnny Raper
Substitutes:
IC	14	Harry Bath
IC	15	Doug McRitchie
IC	16	Neville Smith
IC	17	Ian Walsh
Coach: Frank Burge

== See also ==
- Illawarra Steelers
- St. George Illawarra Dragons

== Sources ==
- Heads, Ian (1989). March of the dragons: the story of St George Rugby League Club. Lester-Townsend Publishing. ISBN 9780949853202.
- Writer, Larry (1995). Never before, never again. Macmillan. ISBN 9780732908164.
- Heads, Ian (2001). Saints: the legend lives on : the story of the St. George Rugby League Football Club. Playright Publishing. ISBN 9780949853806.
- Whiticker, Alan & Collis, Ian (2006) The History of Rugby League Clubs, New Holland, Sydney
- Heads, Ian and Middleton, David (2008) A Centenary of Rugby League, MacMillan Sydney
- Haddan, Steve (2007) The Finals – 100 Years of National Rugby League Finals, Steve Haddan Publishing, Brisbane
