= 1972 Eastern Suburbs season =

← 1971	1973 →

The 1972 Eastern Suburbs season was the 65th in the club's history. They competed in the NSWRFL's 1972 premiership, winning 18 of their 25 matches and finishing runners-up, defeated by Manly-Warringah.

== Team ==
- Coach- Don Furner
- Captain- Ron Coote
- Lineup-
- FB Allan McKean
- WG Jim Porter
- CE Harry Cameron
- CE Mark Harris
- WG Bill Mullins
- FE John Ballesty
- HB Kevin Junee
- PR John Armstrong
- HK Peter Moscatt
- PR Arthur Beetson
- SR Greg Bandiera
- John Quayle
- LK Ron Coote (c)
- SR Laurie Freier
- Mick Alchin
- Johnny Mayes
- Kel Jones
- Dick Thornett
- Phil Hawthorne
- C. Boyd
- C. Renilson
- P. Flanders

== Ladder ==
	Team	Pld	W	D	L	PF	PA	PD	Pts
1	Manly-Warringah	22	18	1	3	460	255	+205	37
2	Eastern Suburbs	22	17	1	4	514	297	+217	35
3	St. George	22	16	2	4	398	221	+177	34
4	South Sydney	22	14	0	8	456	331	+125	28
5	Newtown	22	11	2	9	402	371	+31	24
6	Canterbury-Bankstown	22	12	0	10	382	373	+9	24
7	Western Suburbs	22	8	1	13	367	398	-31	17
8	Cronulla-Sutherland	22	8	0	14	332	378	-46	16
9	North Sydney	22	7	1	14	320	405	-85	15
10	Balmain	22	6	1	15	333	455	-122	13
11	Penrith	22	5	1	16	278	490	-212	11
12	Parramatta	22	4	2	16	317	585	-268	10

== Season summary ==
- Eastern Suburbs finished the season as runners-up, beaten by Manly Warringah 19-14in the grand final.
- Allan McKean was the highest point scorer for the New South Wales Rugby League(NSWRL) in the 1972 season.

Preceded by 1971	Season; 1972	Succeeded by 1973
