= 1972 NSWRFL season =

Rugby league competition

1972 New South Wales Rugby Football League
- Teams: 12
- Premiers: Manly-Warringah (1st title)
- Minor premiers: Manly-Warringah (2nd title)
- Matches played: 136
- Points scored: 4670
- Attendance: 1469899
- Top points scorer(s): Allan McKean (220)
- Wooden spoon: Parramatta (11th spoon)
- Rothmans Medal: Tommy Raudonikis
- Top try-scorer(s): Bob Fulton (19)

The 1972 New South Wales Rugby Football League premiership was the 65th season of Sydney's professional rugby league football competition, and Australia's first. Twelve teams, including six of 1908's foundation clubs and another six from across Sydney, competed for the J. J. Giltinan Shield during the season. The competition culminated in a grand final match between the Manly-Warringah and Eastern Suburbs clubs.

== Season summary ==
The 1972 season's Rothmans Medal winner was Western Suburbs' halfback Tommy Raudonikis. Rugby League Week awarded their player of the year award to Eastern Suburbs' five-eighth John Ballesty.

This season, for the first time since 1966, Souths would fail to reach the grand final, and for the first time since 1948, the Grand Final did not feature either Souths or St George.

Following the grand final, several players travelled to France to represent Australia in the 1972 Rugby League World Cup.

=== Teams ===
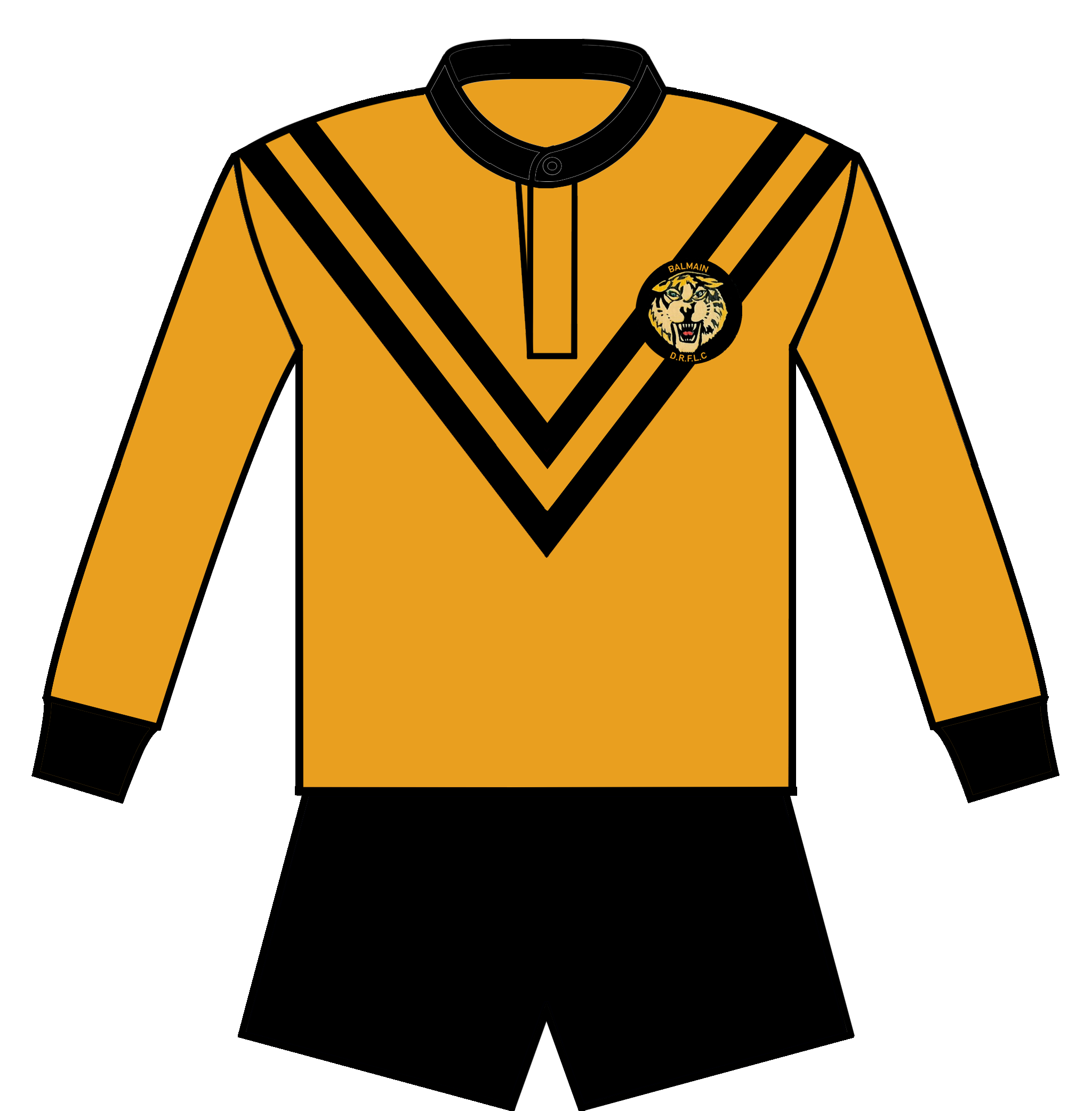
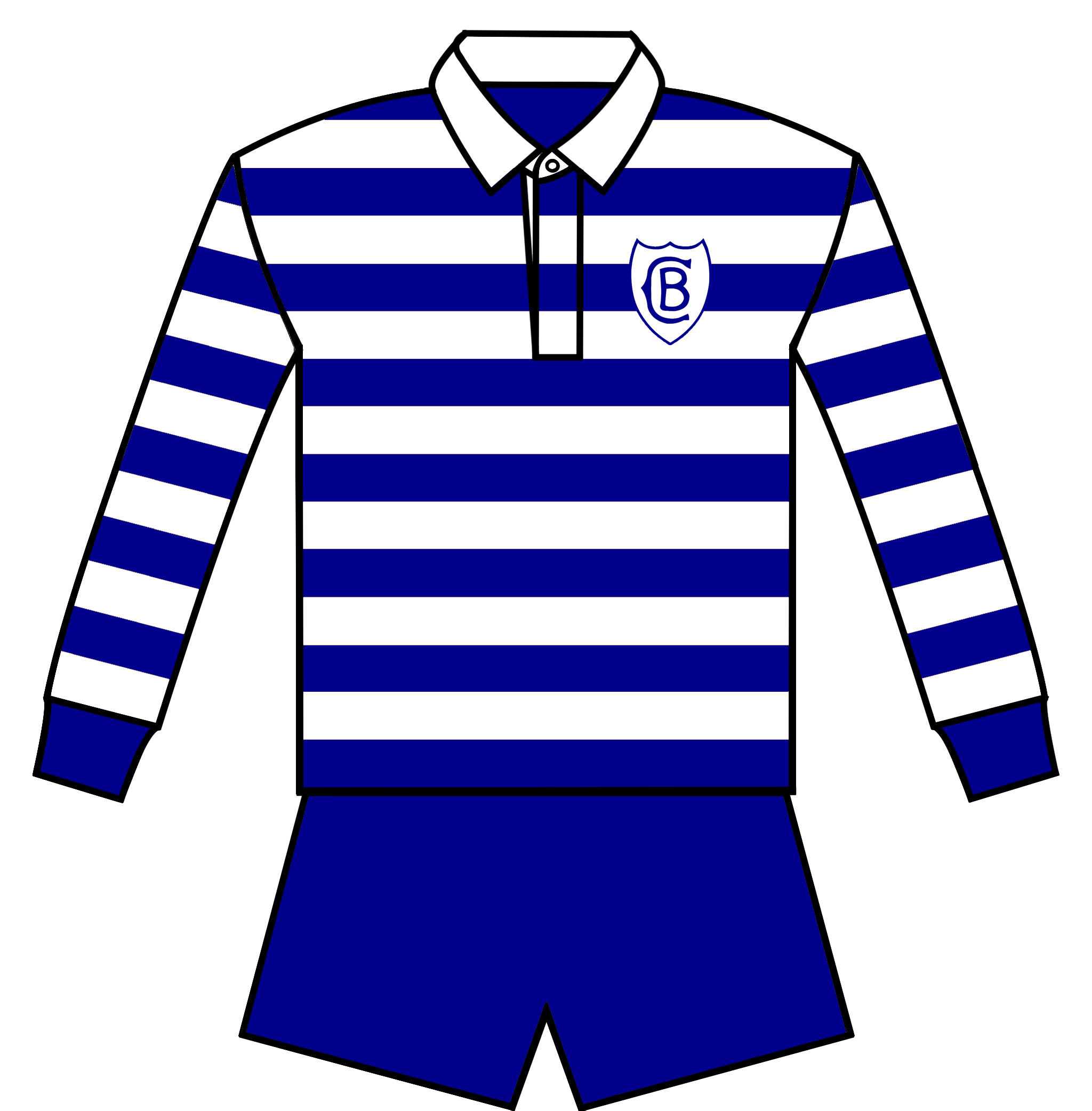
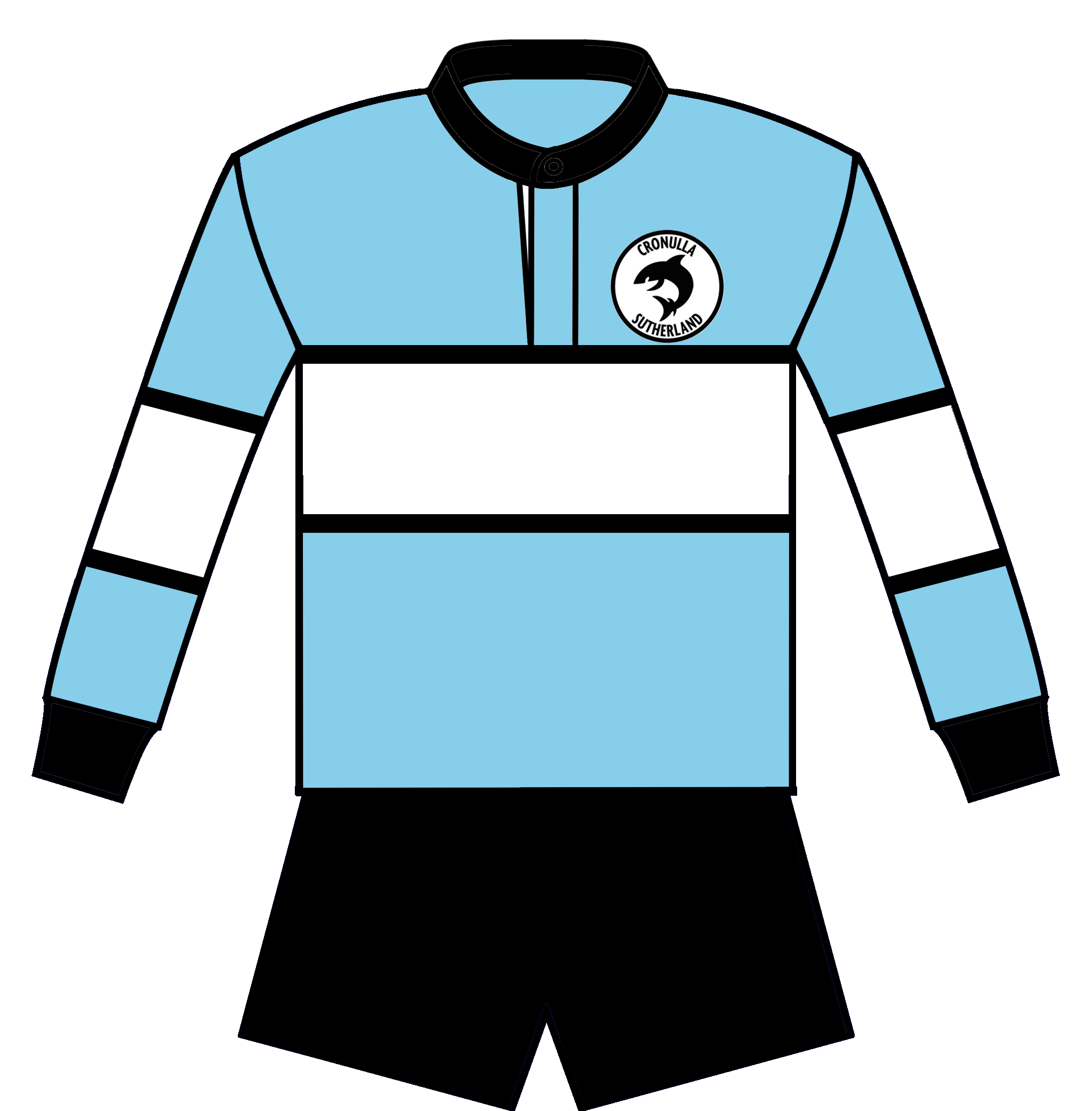
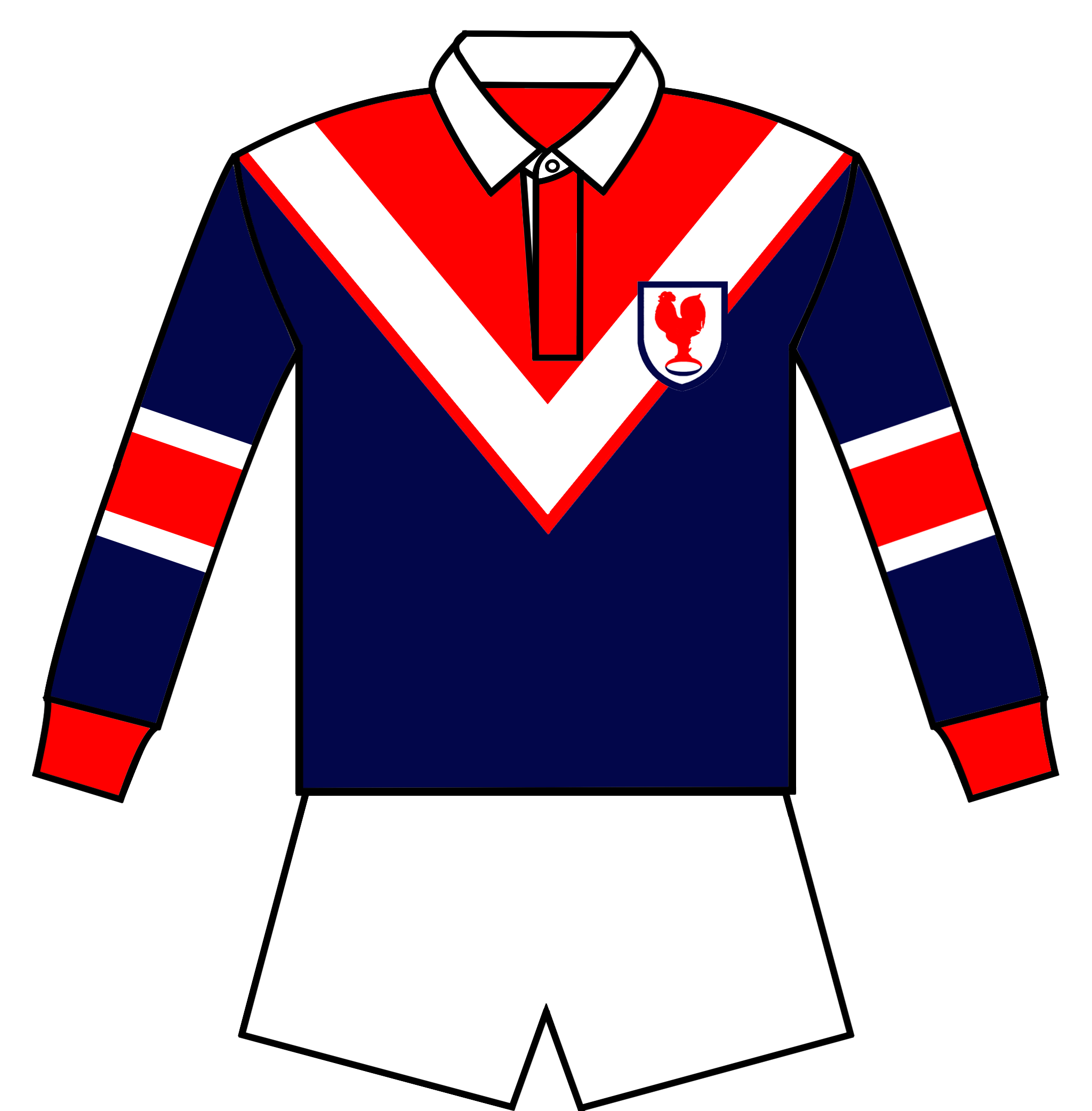
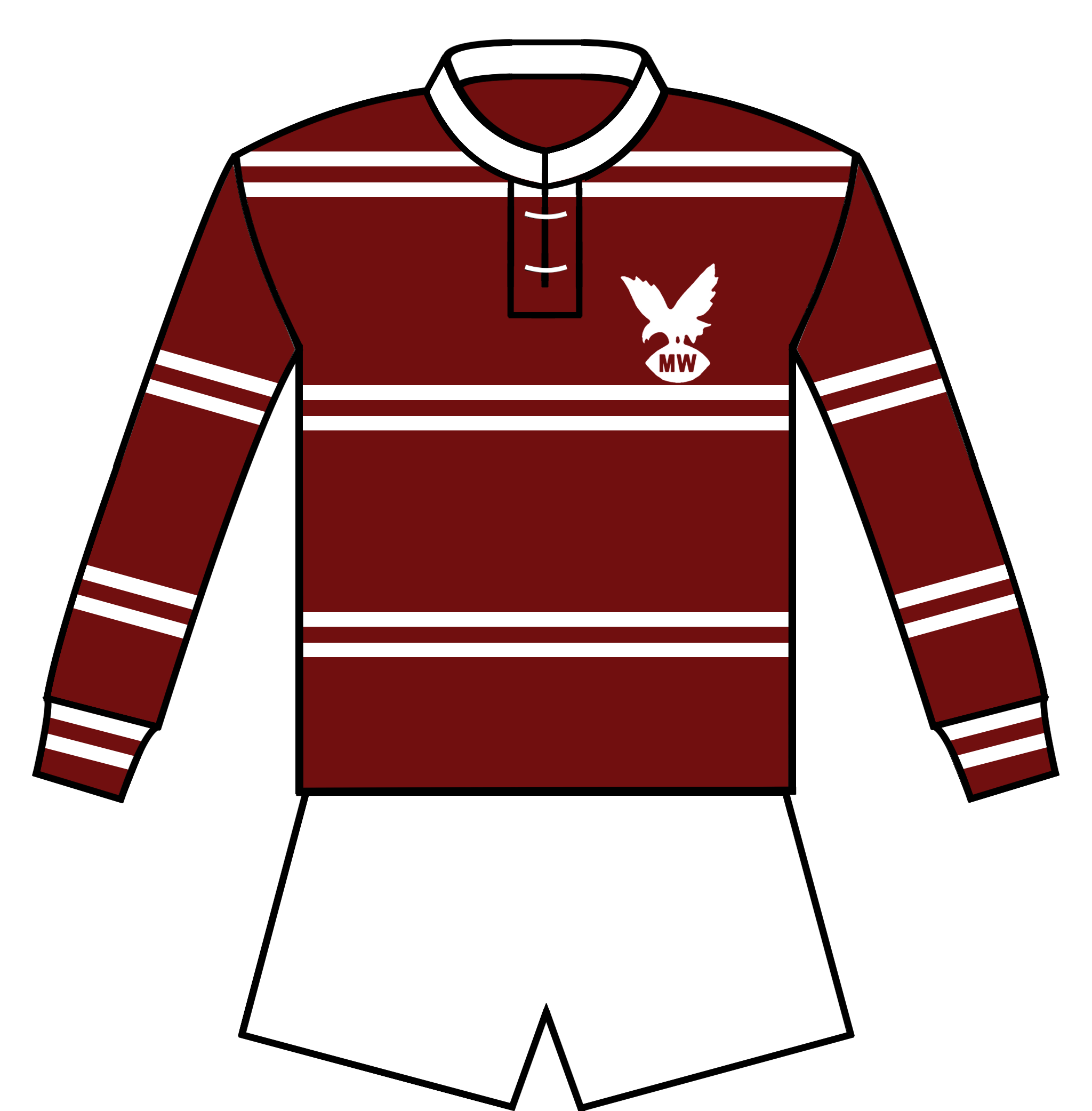
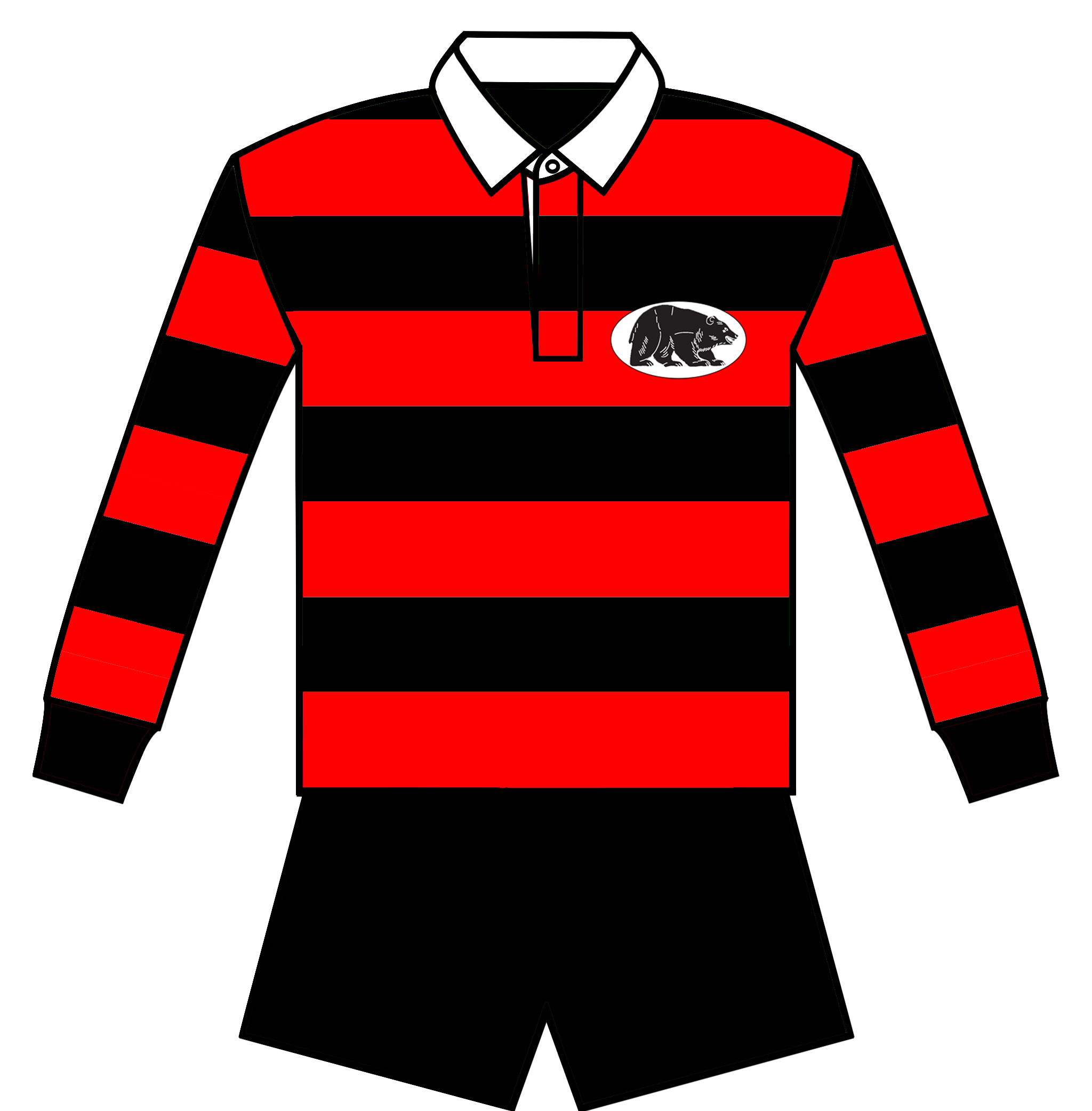
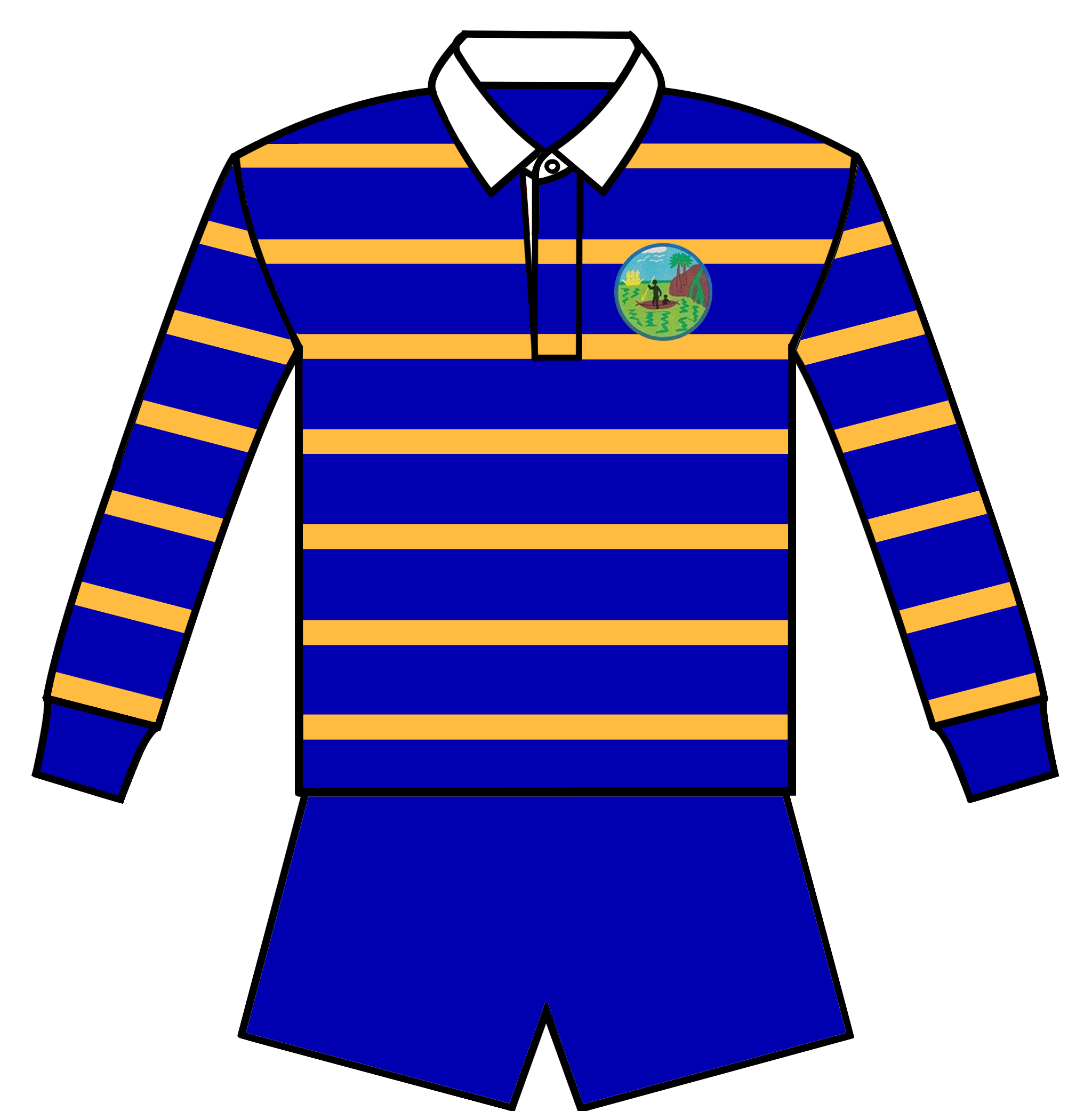
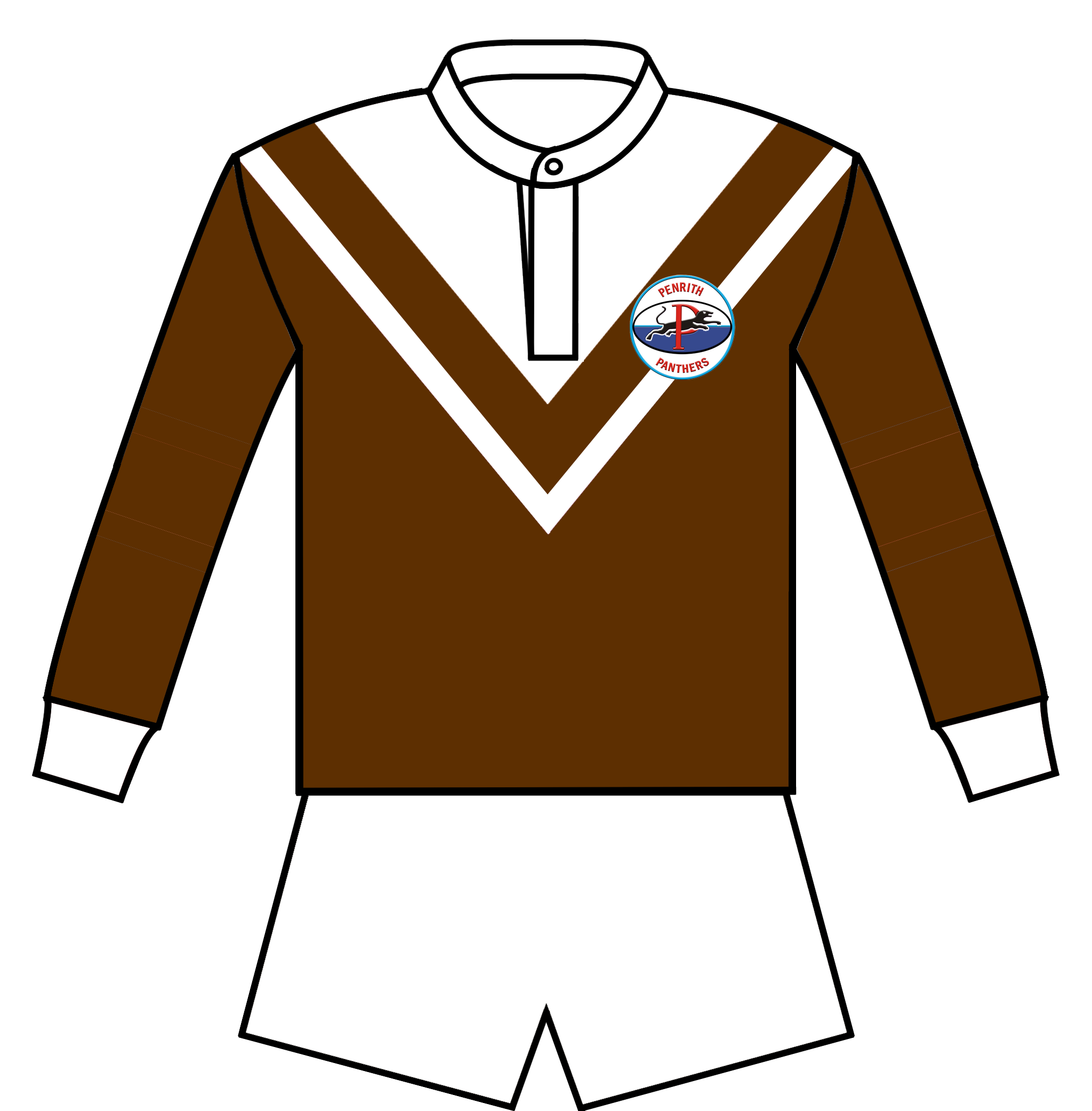
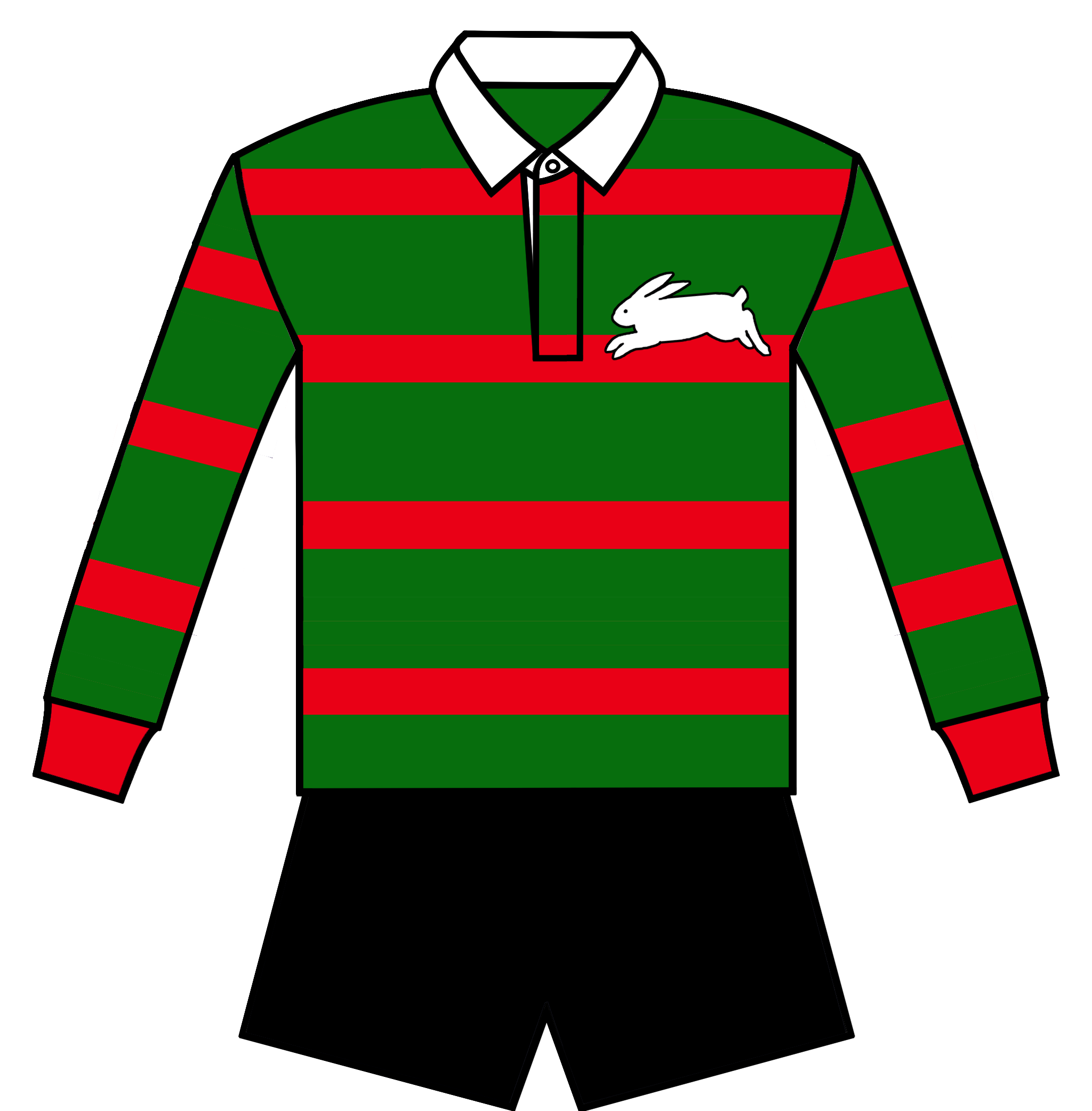
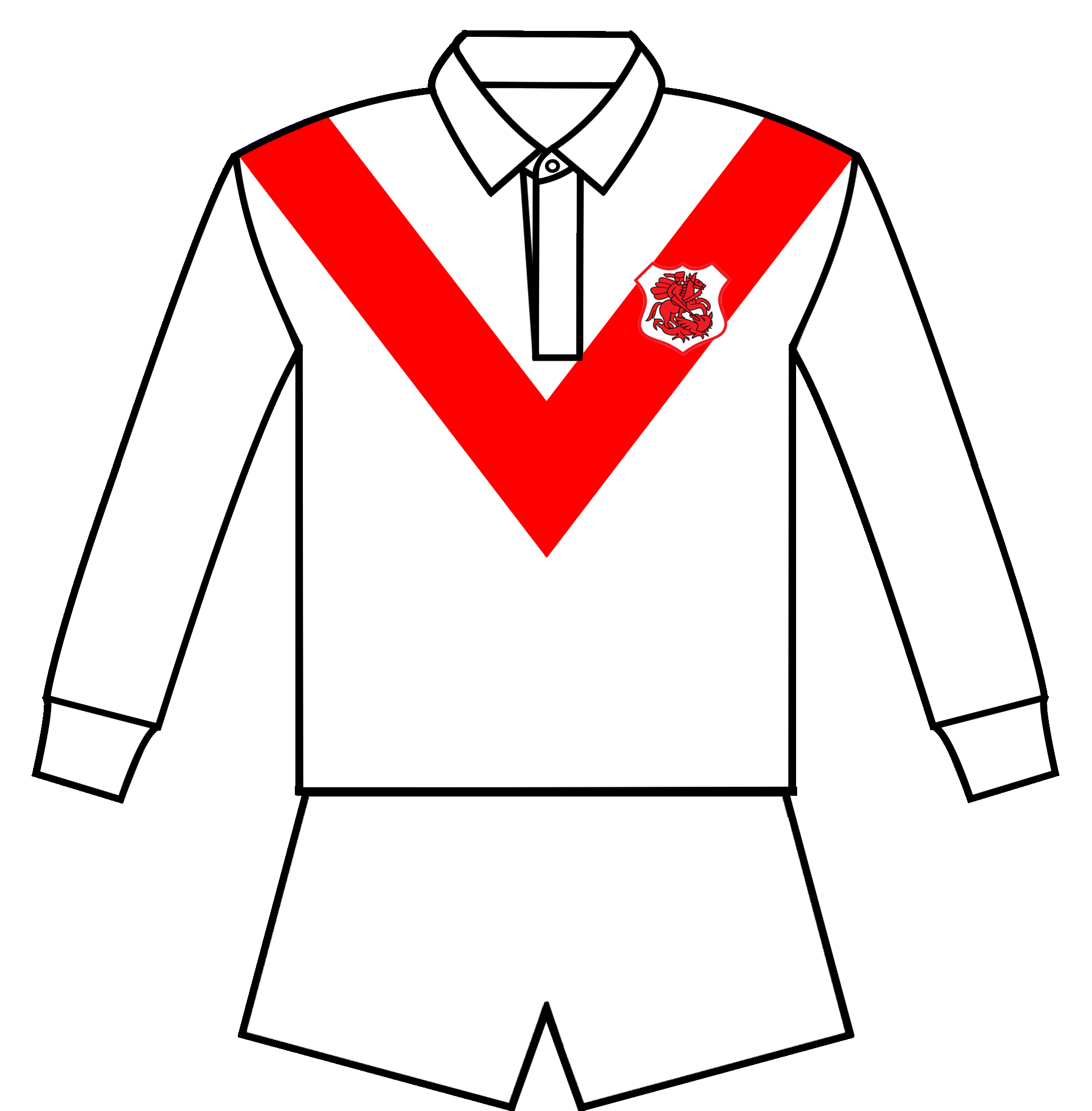
Balmain 65th season Ground: Sydney Sports Ground; Coach: Leo Nosworthy; Captain: Garry Leo	Canterbury-Bankstown 38th season Ground: Belmore Oval; Coach: Bob Hagan; Captain: Johnny Greaves	Cronulla-Sutherland 6th season Ground: Endeavour Field; Coach: Tommy Bishop; Captain: Cliff Watson / Ken Maddison	Eastern Suburbs 65th season Ground: Sydney Sports Ground; Coach: Don Furner; Captain: Ron Coote
Manly-Warringah 26th season Ground: Brookvale Oval; Coach: Ron Willey; Captain: Fred Jones	Newtown 65th season Ground: Henson Park; Coach: Harry Bath; Captain: Lionel Williamson	North Sydney 65th season Ground: North Sydney Oval; Captain-coach: Merv Hicks	Parramatta 26th season Ground: Cumberland Oval; Coach: Ian Walsh; Captain: Bob O'Reilly
Penrith 6th season Ground: Penrith Park; Coach: Bob Boland; Captain: Ron Lynch	South Sydney 65th season Ground: Redfern Oval; Coach: Clive Churchill; Captain: John Sattler	St. George 52nd season Ground: Kogarah Oval; Captain-coach: Graeme Langlands	Western Suburbs 65th season Ground: Lidcombe Oval, Pratten Park; Coach: Don Parish; Captain: Tom Raudonikis

== Regular season ==
Team	1	2	3	4	5	6	7	8	9	10	11	12	13	14	15	16	17	18	19	20	21	22	F1	F2	F3	GF
Balmain	**WES** **+4**	NOR −10	**PAR**; **0**	PEN −5	EAS −11	**STG** **−9**	CBY −6	NEW +5	**MAN** **+10**	**SOU** **−18**	CRO −4	WES +9	**NOR** **+7**	PAR −7	**PEN** **+9**	**EAS** **−7**	STG −8	**CBY** **−2**	**NEW** **−13**	MAN −22	SOU −21	**CRO** **−23**				
Canterbury-Bankstown	**STG** **+4**	NEW −12	**SOU** **−14**	WES −4	PAR +10	**EAS** **+6**	**BAL** **+6**	MAN −29	**CRO** **+21**	**NOR** **−1**	PEN +23	STG −3	**NEW** **−2**	SOU −16	**WES** **+15**	**PAR** **+9**	EAS −7	BAL +2	**MAN** **−14**	CRO +5	NOR +3	**PEN** **+7**				
Cronulla-Sutherland	**NOR** **+13**	**PEN** **−3**	STG −37	**NEW** **−15**	SOU −14	**WES** **−6**	**PAR** **+14**	EAS −17	CBY −21	MAN −14	**BAL** **+4**	NOR −2	PEN +2	**STG** **−1**	NEW −2	**SOU** **+11**	WES +18	PAR +18	**EAS** **−7**	**CBY** **−5**	**MAN** **−5**	BAL +23				
Eastern Suburbs	NEW +23	SOU −9	WES +16	**PAR** **+38**	**BAL** **+11**	CBY −6	**MAN** **+7**	**CRO** **+17**	NOR +14	PEN +23	**STG**; **0**	**NEW** **−15**	**SOU** **+5**	**WES** **+20**	PAR +21	BAL +7	**CBY** **+7**	MAN −3	CRO +7	**NOR** **+2**	**PEN** **+23**	STG +9	X	MAN −24	**STG** **+2**	MAN −5
Manly-Warringah	**PEN** **+28**	STG −18	**NEW** **+1**	**SOU** **+7**	**WES** **+4**	PAR +2	EAS −7	**CBY** **+29**	BAL −10	**CRO** **+14**	NOR +12	PEN +20	**STG**; **0**	NEW +1	SOU +8	WES +25	**PAR** **+22**	**EAS** **+3**	CBY +14	**BAL** **+22**	CRO +5	**NOR** **+23**	X	**EAS** **+24**	X	**EAS** **+5**
Newtown	**EAS** **−23**	**CBY** **+12**	MAN −1	CRO +15	**NOR**; **0**	**PEN** **+18**	STG −10	**BAL** **−5**	**SOU** **−9**	WES −3	PAR +12	EAS +15	CBY +2	**MAN** **−1**	**CRO** **+2**	NOR +10	PEN; 0	**STG** **−20**	BAL +13	SOU +8	**WES** **+6**	**PAR** **−10**				
North Sydney	CRO −13	**BAL** **+10**	PEN +19	**STG** **−8**	NEW; 0	**SOU** **−5**	WES −29	**PAR** **+24**	**EAS** **−14**	CBY +1	**MAN** **−12**	**CRO** **+2**	BAL −7	**PEN** **+27**	STG −3	**NEW** **−10**	SOU −26	**WES** **+3**	PAR −16	EAS −2	**CBY** **−3**	MAN −23				
Parramatta	SOU −34	**WES**; **0**	BAL; 0	EAS −38	**CBY** **−10**	**MAN** **−2**	CRO −14	NOR −24	**PEN** **+7**	STG −22	**NEW** **−12**	**SOU** **−10**	WES −42	**BAL** **+7**	**EAS** **−21**	CBY −9	MAN −22	**CRO** **−18**	**NOR** **+16**	PEN −12	**STG** **−18**	NEW +10				
Penrith	MAN −28	CRO +3	**NOR** **−19**	**BAL** **+5**	STG −24	NEW −18	**SOU** **−6**	**WES** **−18**	PAR −7	**EAS** **−23**	**CBY** **−23**	**MAN** **−20**	**CRO** **−2**	NOR −27	BAL −9	**STG** **−5**	**NEW**; **0**	SOU +6	WES +21	**PAR** **+12**	EAS −23	CBY −7				
South Sydney	**PAR** **+34**	**EAS** **+9**	CBY +14	MAN −7	**CRO** **+14**	NOR +5	PEN +6	**STG** **−17**	NEW +9	BAL +18	**WES** **+14**	PAR +10	EAS −5	**CBY** **+16**	**MAN** **−8**	CRO −11	**NOR** **+26**	**PEN** **−6**	STG +10	**NEW** **−8**	**BAL** **+21**	WES −19	STG −4			
St. George	CBY −4	**MAN** **+18**	**CRO** **+37**	NOR +8	**PEN** **+24**	BAL +9	**NEW** **+10**	SOU +17	WES −4	**PAR** **+22**	EAS; 0	**CBY** **+3**	MAN; 0	CRO +1	**NOR** **+3**	PEN +5	**BAL** **+8**	NEW +20	**SOU** **−10**	**WES** **+1**	PAR +18	**EAS** **−9**	**SOU** **+4**	X	EAS −2	
Western Suburbs	BAL −4	PAR; 0	**EAS** **−16**	**CBY** **+4**	MAN −4	CRO +6	**NOR** **+29**	PEN +18	**STG** **+4**	**NEW** **+3**	SOU −14	**BAL** **−9**	**PAR** **+42**	EAS −20	CBY −15	**MAN** **−25**	**CRO** **−18**	NOR −3	**PEN** **−21**	STG −1	NEW −6	**SOU** **+19**				
Team	1	2	3	4	5	6	7	8	9	10	11	12	13	14	15	16	17	18	19	20	21	22	F1	F2	F3	GF

Bold – Home game
X – Bye
Opponent for round listed above margin

=== Ladder ===
	Team	Pld	W	D	L	PF	PA	PD	Pts
1	Manly	22	18	1	3	460	255	+205	37
2	Eastern Suburbs	22	17	1	4	514	297	+217	35
3	St. George	22	16	2	4	398	221	+177	34
4	South Sydney	22	14	0	8	456	331	+125	28
5	Newtown	22	11	2	9	402	371	+31	24
6	Canterbury	22	12	0	10	382	373	+9	24
7	Western Suburbs	22	8	1	13	367	398	-31	17
8	Cronulla	22	8	0	14	332	378	-46	16
9	North Sydney	22	7	1	14	320	405	-85	15
10	Balmain	22	6	1	15	333	455	-122	13
11	Penrith	22	5	1	16	278	490	-212	11
12	Parramatta	22	4	2	16	317	585	-268	10

=== Ladder progression ===
- Numbers highlighted in green indicate that the team finished the round inside the top 4.
- Numbers highlighted in blue indicates the team finished first on the ladder in that round.
- Numbers highlighted in red indicates the team finished last place on the ladder in that round.

	Team	1	2	3	4	5	6	7	8	9	10	11	12	13	14	15	16	17	18	19	20	21	22
1	Manly-Warringah	2	2	4	6	8	10	10	12	12	14	16	18	19	21	23	25	27	29	31	33	35	37
2	Eastern Suburbs	2	2	4	6	8	8	10	12	14	16	17	17	19	21	23	25	27	27	29	31	33	35
3	St. George	0	2	4	6	8	10	12	14	14	16	17	19	20	22	24	26	28	30	30	32	34	34
4	South Sydney	2	4	6	6	8	10	12	12	14	16	18	20	20	22	22	22	24	24	26	26	28	28
5	Newtown	0	2	2	4	5	7	7	7	7	7	9	11	13	13	15	17	18	18	20	22	24	24
6	Canterbury-Bankstown	2	2	2	2	4	6	8	8	10	10	12	12	12	12	14	16	16	18	18	20	22	24
7	Western Suburbs	0	1	1	3	3	5	7	9	11	13	13	13	15	15	15	15	15	15	15	15	15	17
8	Cronulla-Sutherland	2	2	2	2	2	2	4	4	4	4	6	6	8	8	8	10	12	14	14	14	14	16
9	North Sydney	0	2	4	4	5	5	5	7	7	9	9	11	11	13	13	13	13	15	15	15	15	15
10	Balmain	2	2	3	3	3	3	3	5	7	7	7	9	11	11	13	13	13	13	13	13	13	13
11	Penrith	0	2	2	4	4	4	4	4	4	4	4	4	4	4	4	4	5	7	9	11	11	11
12	Parramatta	0	1	2	2	2	2	2	2	4	4	4	4	4	6	6	6	6	6	8	8	8	10

== Finals ==
Home	Score	Away	Match information
Home	Score	Away	Date and time	Venue	Referee	Crowd
Semi-finals
St. George	14–10	South Sydney	26 August 1972	Sydney Cricket Ground	Keith Page	47,945
Manly-Warringah	32–8	Eastern Suburbs	2 September 1972	Sydney Cricket Ground	Keith Page	43,695
Preliminary Final
Eastern Suburbs	8–6	St. George	9 September 1972	Sydney Cricket Ground	Keith Page	41,313
Grand Final
Manly-Warringah	19–14	Eastern Suburbs	16 September 1972	Sydney Cricket Ground	Keith Page	54,537

== Grand final ==
Manly-Warringah	Position	Eastern Suburbs
1. Graham Eadie	FB	1. Allan McKean
2. Ken Irvine	WG	2. Jim Porter
3. Ray Branighan	CE	3. Harry Cameron
4. Bob Fulton	CE	4. Mark Harris
5. Max Brown	WG	5. Bill Mullins
6. Ian Martin	FE	6. John Ballesty
7. Dennis Ward	HB	7. Kevin Junee
13. Bill Hamilton	PR	13. John Armstrong
12. Fred Jones (c)	HK	12. Peter Moscatt
11. John O'Neill	PR	11. Arthur Beetson
10. Allan Thomson	SR	10. Greg Bandiera
9. Terry Randall	SR	9. John Quayle
8. Mal Reilly	LK	8. Ron Coote (c)
	Bench	16. Laurie Freier
Ron Willey	Coach	Don Furner

After twenty-five years in the competition and five Grand Final losses, Manly finally broke through to win the club's first NSWRFL premiership.

In a controversial match, the Sea-Eagles downed the Eastern Suburbs Roosters 19 to 14, thus shedding their 'bridesmaids' tag. The Roosters were highly critical of referee Keith Page after the match, claiming both of Manly's tries shouldn't have been awarded. To add to their rage, Easts crossed for two tries that were disallowed.

A dour first half saw the teams go to the break tied 4–4, before a try by hooker Fred Jones put Manly ahead. Jones appeared to drop the ball as he attempted to ground it, but was awarded a try nonetheless. For his part Jones contends that he did place the ball with downward pressure. Midway through the second half, controversy flared again when Manly centre Ray Branighan appeared to stop over the Eastern Suburbs try line after accepting what looked like a forward pass from prop Bill Hamilton. However, referee Page allowed it and the Manly fans began celebrating, knowing that at 19–4 their first premiership victory was assured. Although Easts fought back with two late tries to John Ballesty and Bill Mullins and brought the score to 19–14, time ran out for the Roosters and Manly had won their first ever premiership in first grade.

In the end, it was Manly's part-time goal kicker Ray Branighan who proved the difference, kicking six goals from eight attempts.

Manly-Warringah 19 (Tries: Fred Jones, Ray Branighan. Goals: Ray Branighan 6. Field Goal: Bob Fulton)

Eastern Suburbs 14 (Tries: John Ballesty, Bill Mullins. Goals: Allan McKean 4)

Man of the Match: Dennis Ward (Manly).

Referee: Keith Page

Attendance: 54,537

== Player statistics ==
The following statistics are as of the conclusion of Round 22.

Top 5 point scorers

Points	Player	Tries	Goals	Field Goals
202	Allan McKean	7	90	1
166	Eric Simms	2	79	2
151	Barry Andrews	3	71	0
147	Graeme Langlands	7	63	0
134	Peter Inskip	3	62	1

Top 5 try scorers

Tries	Player
18	John Bradstock
17	Bob Fulton
16	Bill Mullins
15	Mark Harris
15	Glen Capelin

Top 5 goal scorers

Goals	Player
90	Allan McKean
79	Eric Simms
71	Barry Andrews
64	Tony Ford
63	Graeme Langlands
