= 1970 NSWRFL season =

Rugby league competition

1970 New South Wales Rugby Football League
- Teams: 12
- Premiers: South Sydney (19th title)
- Minor premiers: South Sydney (16th title)
- Matches played: 136
- Points scored: 4407
- Total attendance: 1630630
- Top points scorer: Eric Simms (241)
- Wooden spoon: Parramatta (10th spoon)
- Rothmans Medal: Kevin Junee
- Top try-scorer: Ken Irvine (16)

The 1970 New South Wales Rugby Football League premiership was the 63rd season of Sydney's professional rugby league football competition, Australia's first. Twelve teams, including six foundation clubs and another six admitted post 1908, competed for the J. J. Giltinan Shield during the season which culminated in a grand final match for the WD & HO Wills Cup between the Manly-Warringah and South Sydney clubs.

== Season summary ==
Following the previous season's "lay-down" or "stop-start" grand final, rugby league's rules were changed for this season so that rather than stopping the game to call a doctor onto the field when a player goes down injured, the ball is given to a team-mate to play so that no advantage can be gained from feigning injury. Head-high tackles were also outlawed at the commencement of the 1971 season. Each side met all others twice in twenty-two regular season rounds before the top four finishers, Souths, Manly, St. George and Canterbury, fought out four finals for a place in the grand final.

The 1970 season's Rothmans Medallist was Eastern Suburbs' halfback Kevin Junee. Rugby League Week awarded their player of the year award to Cronulla-Sutherland's halfback Tommy Bishop.

=== Teams ===
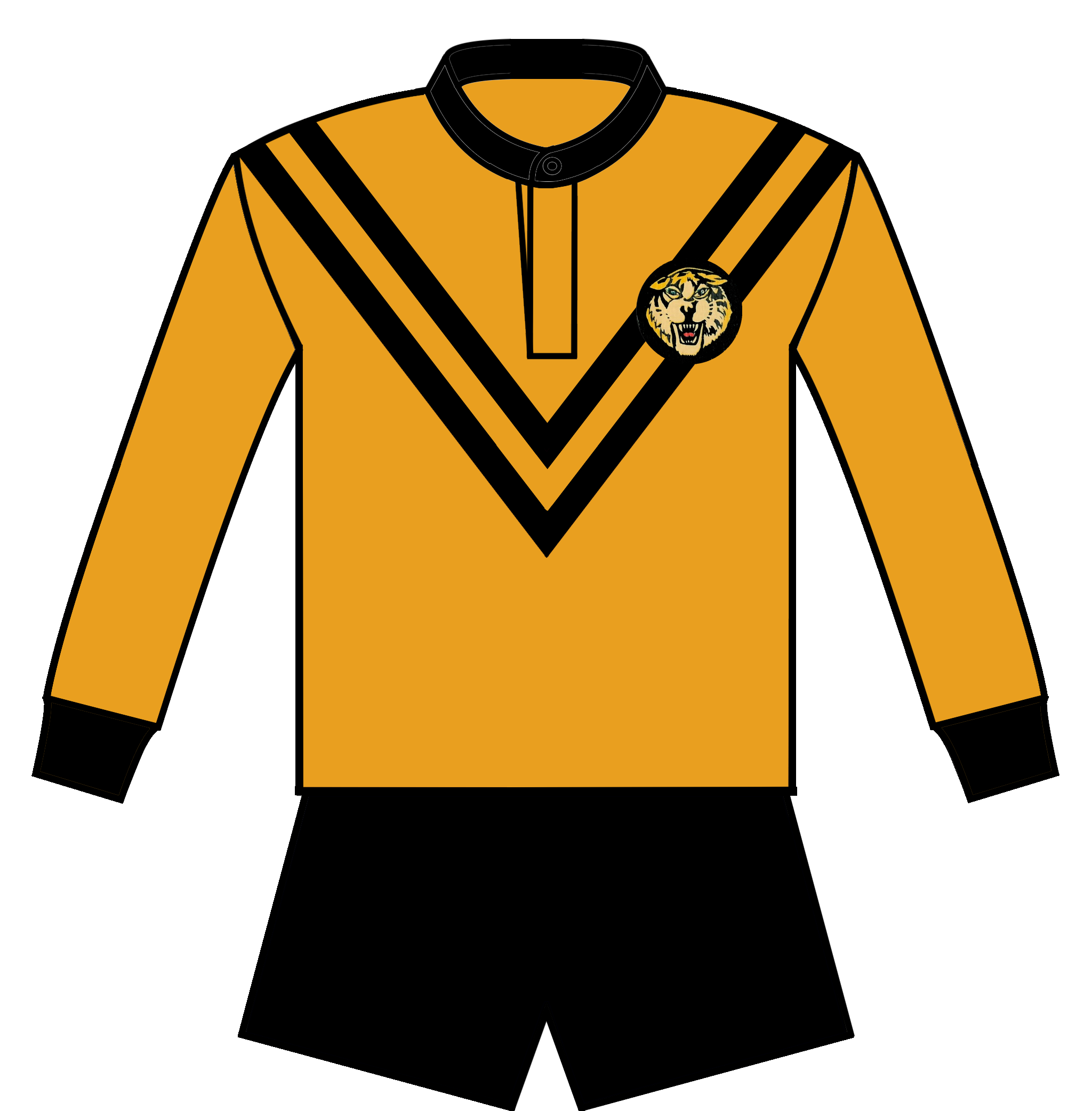
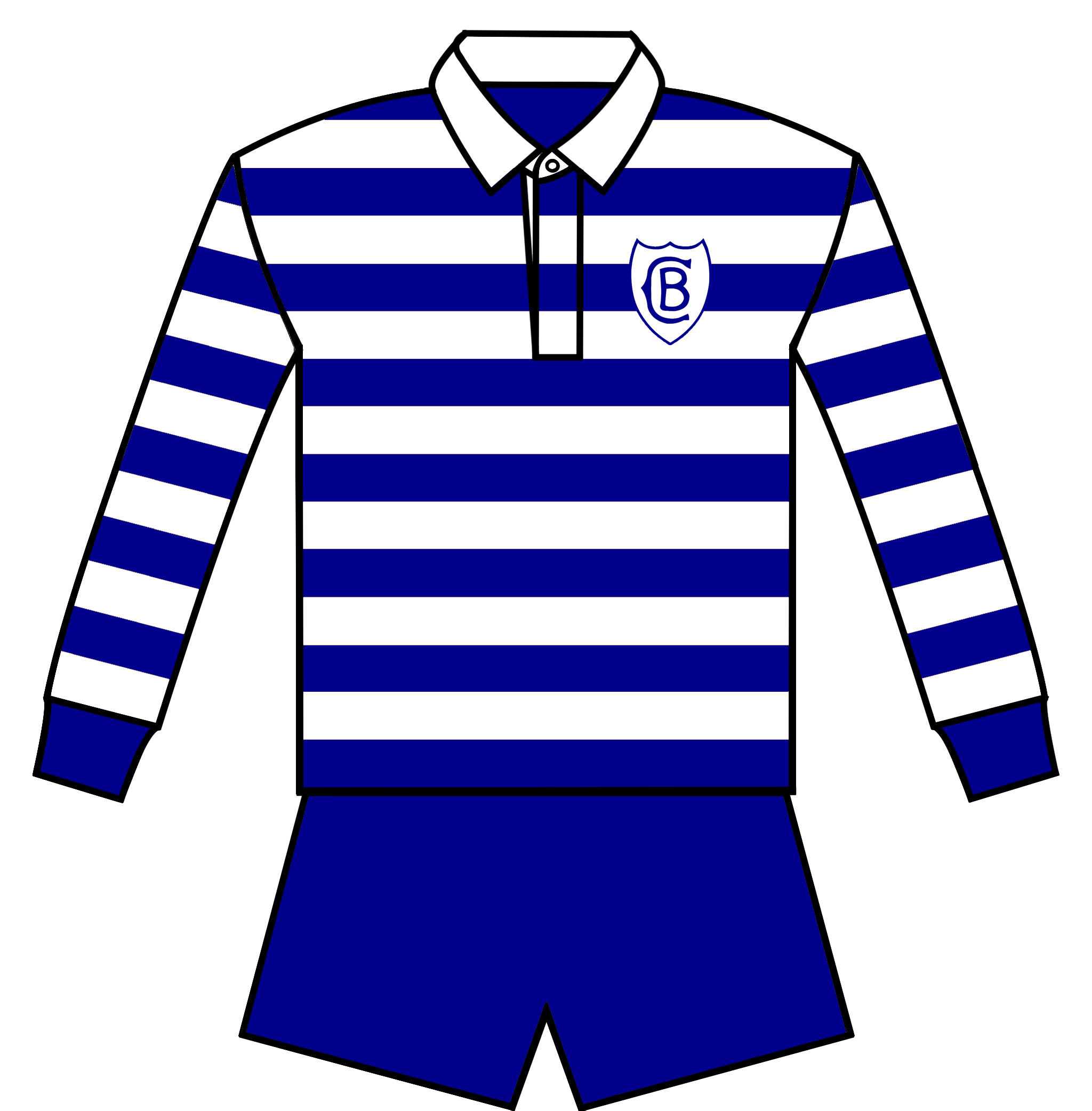
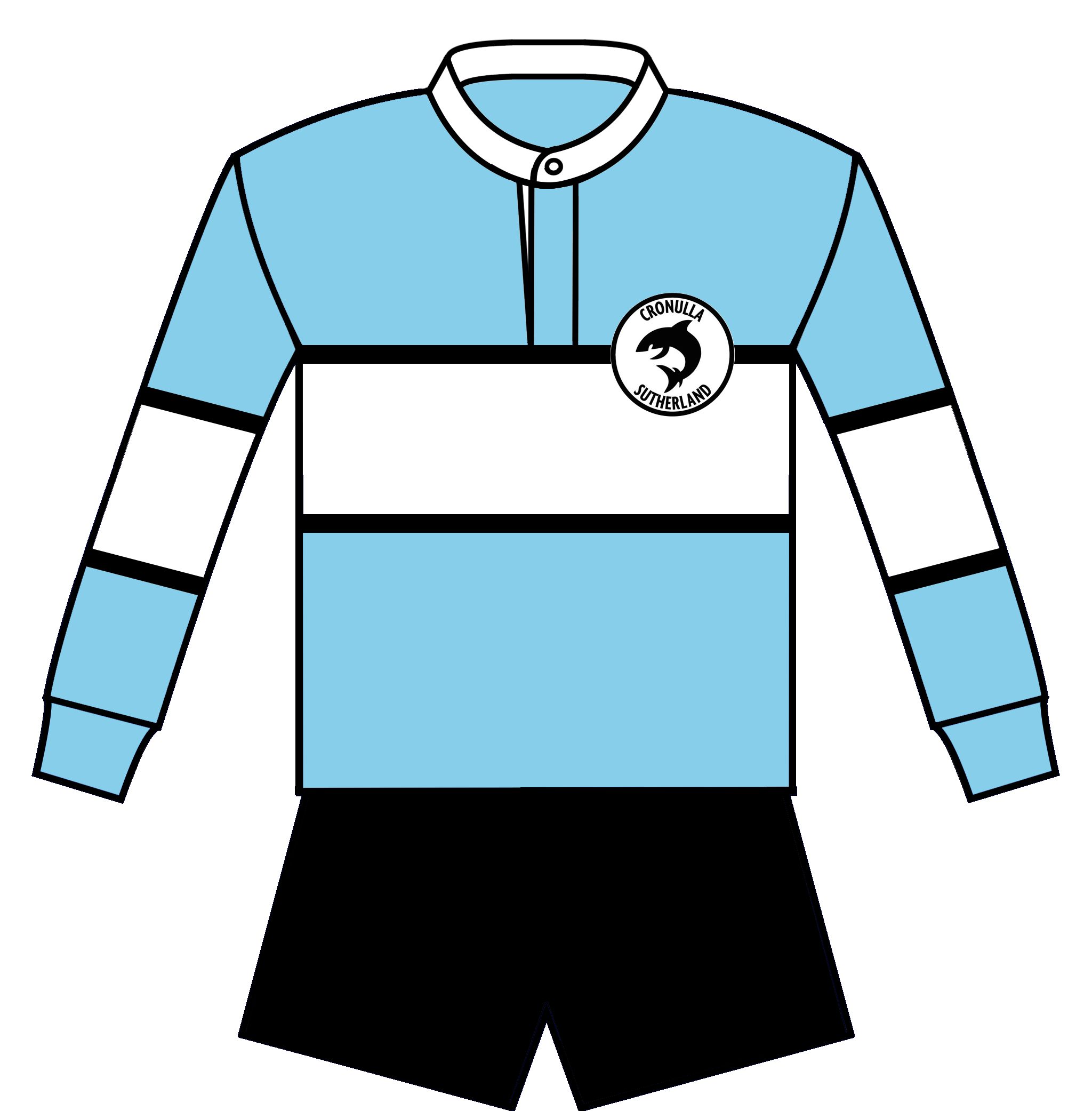
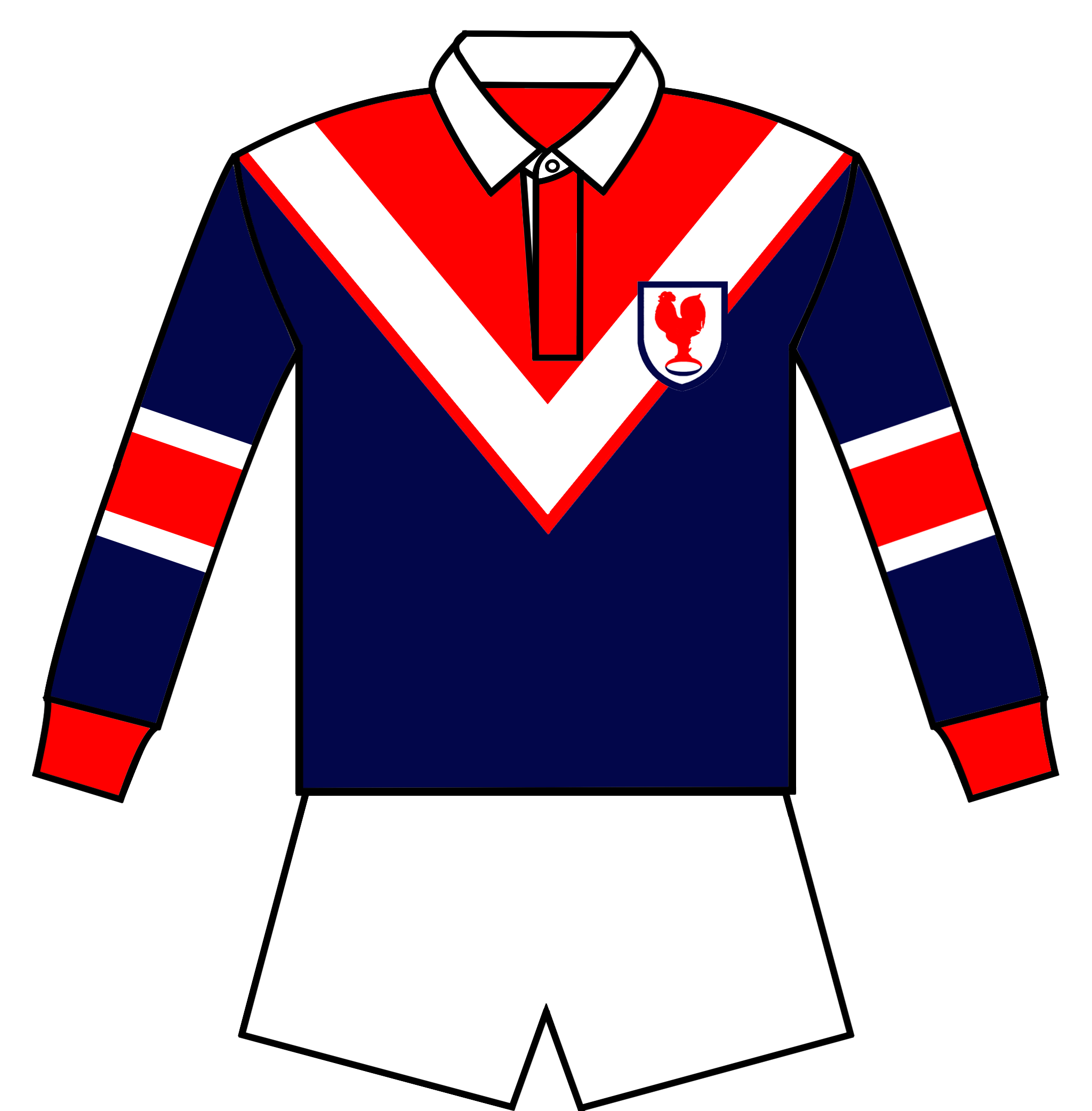
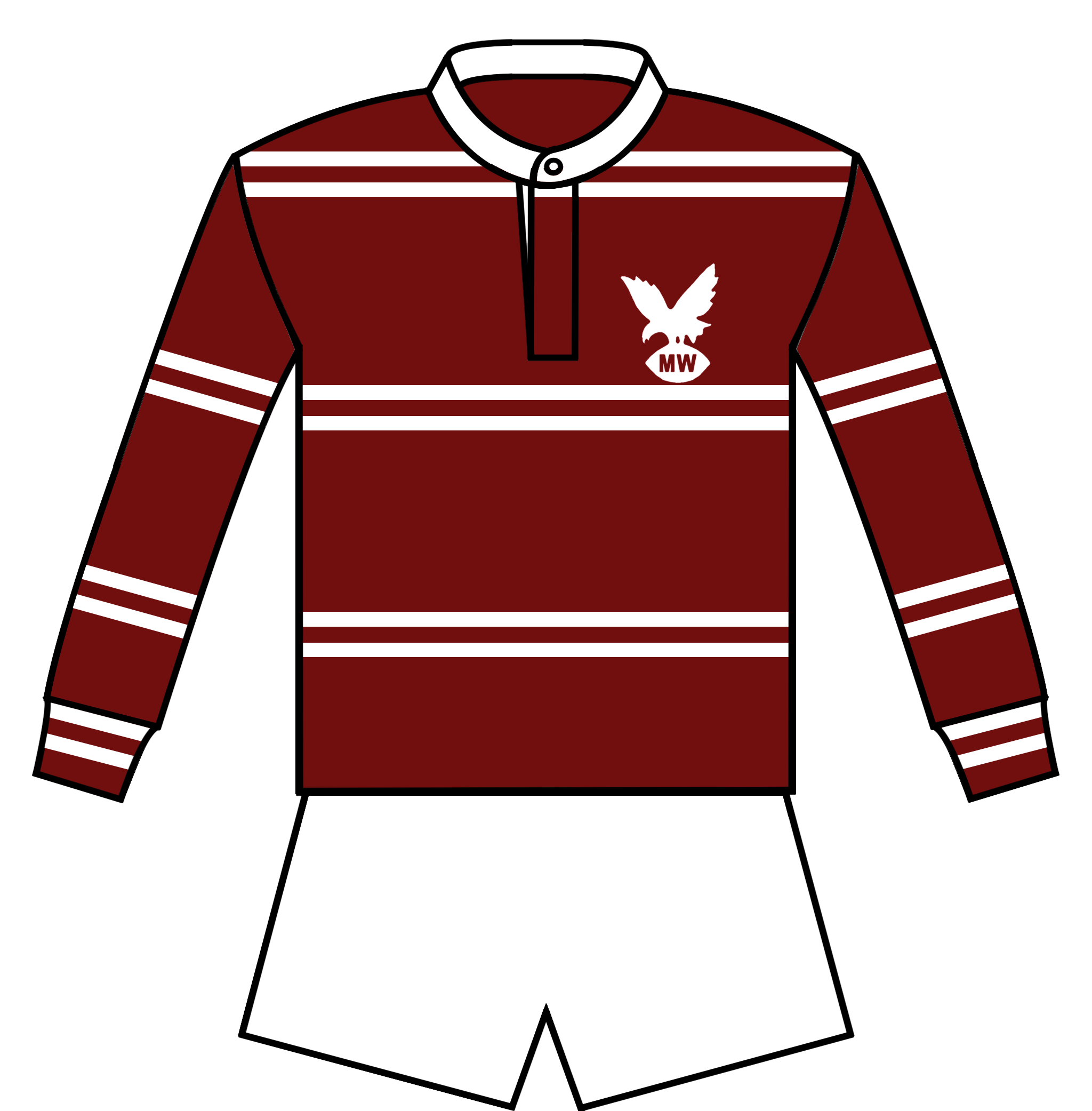
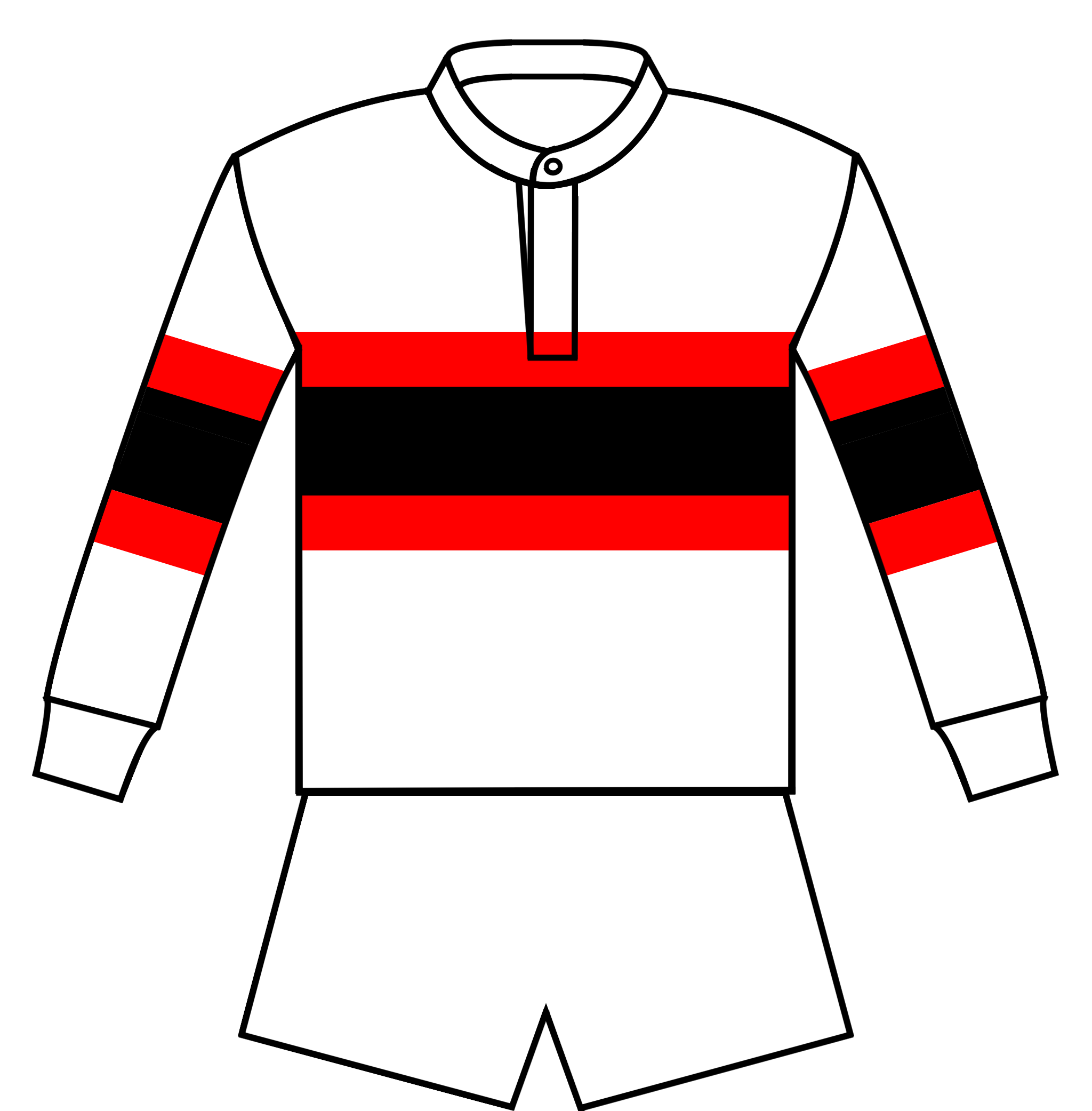
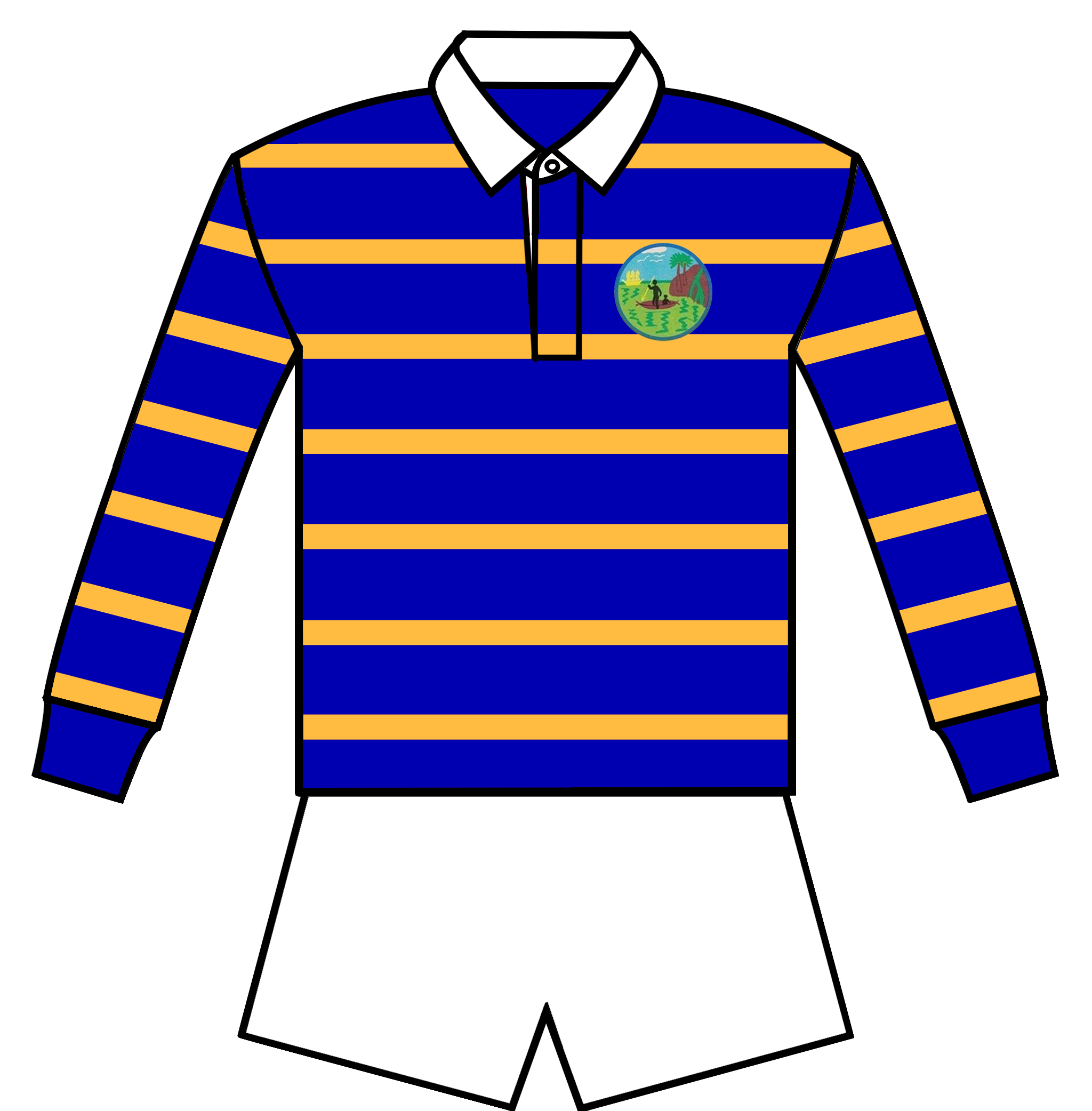
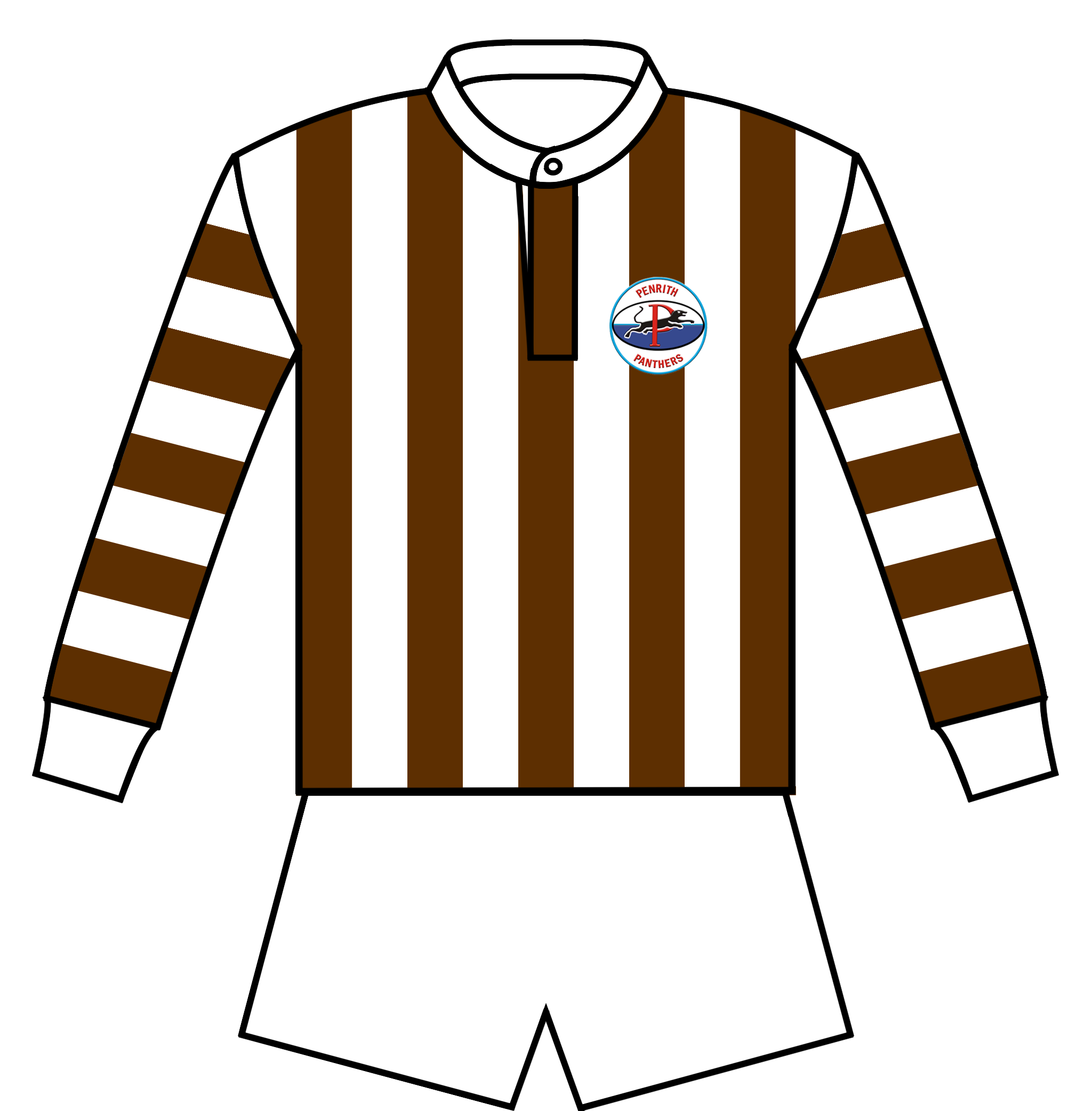
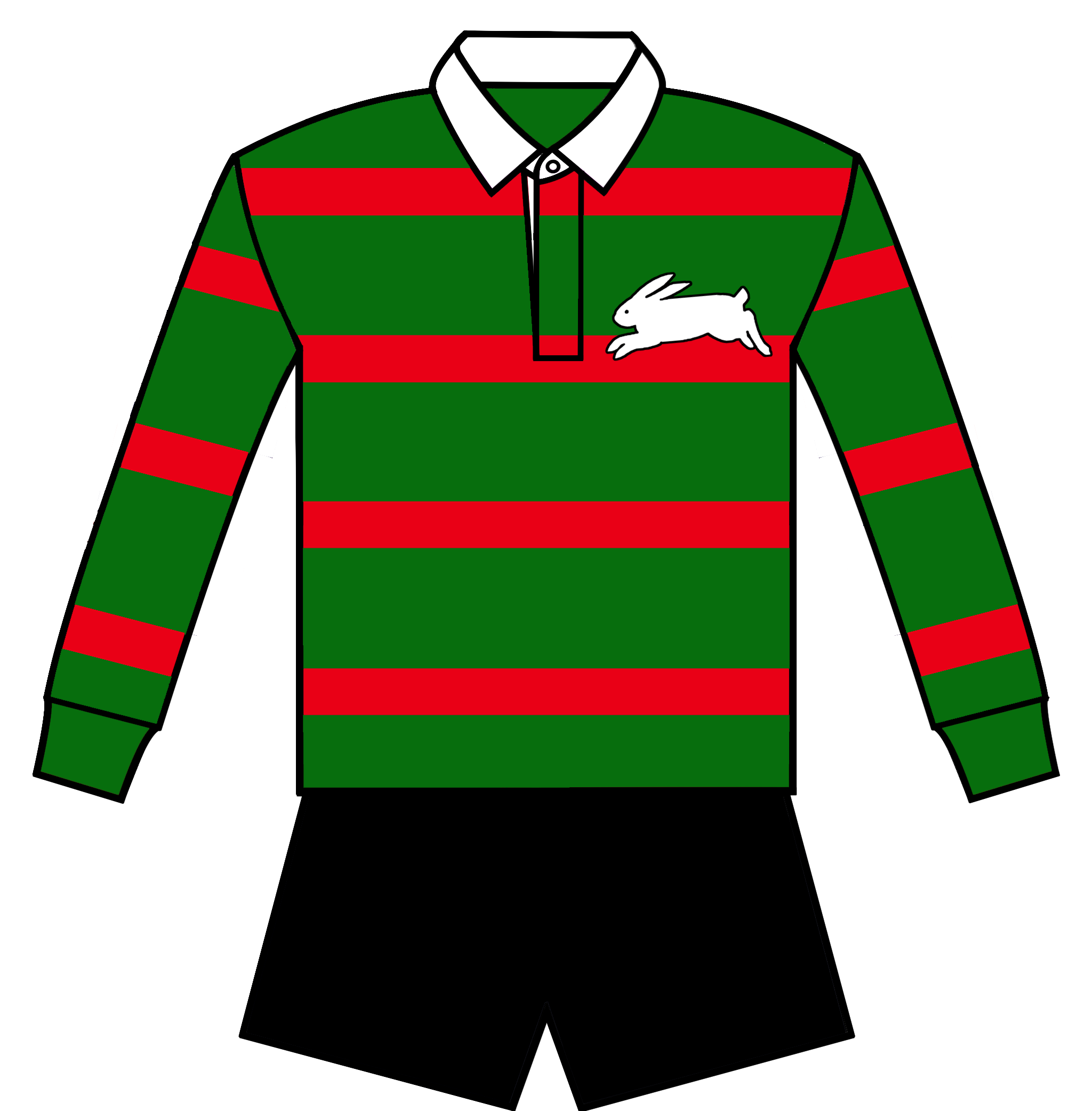
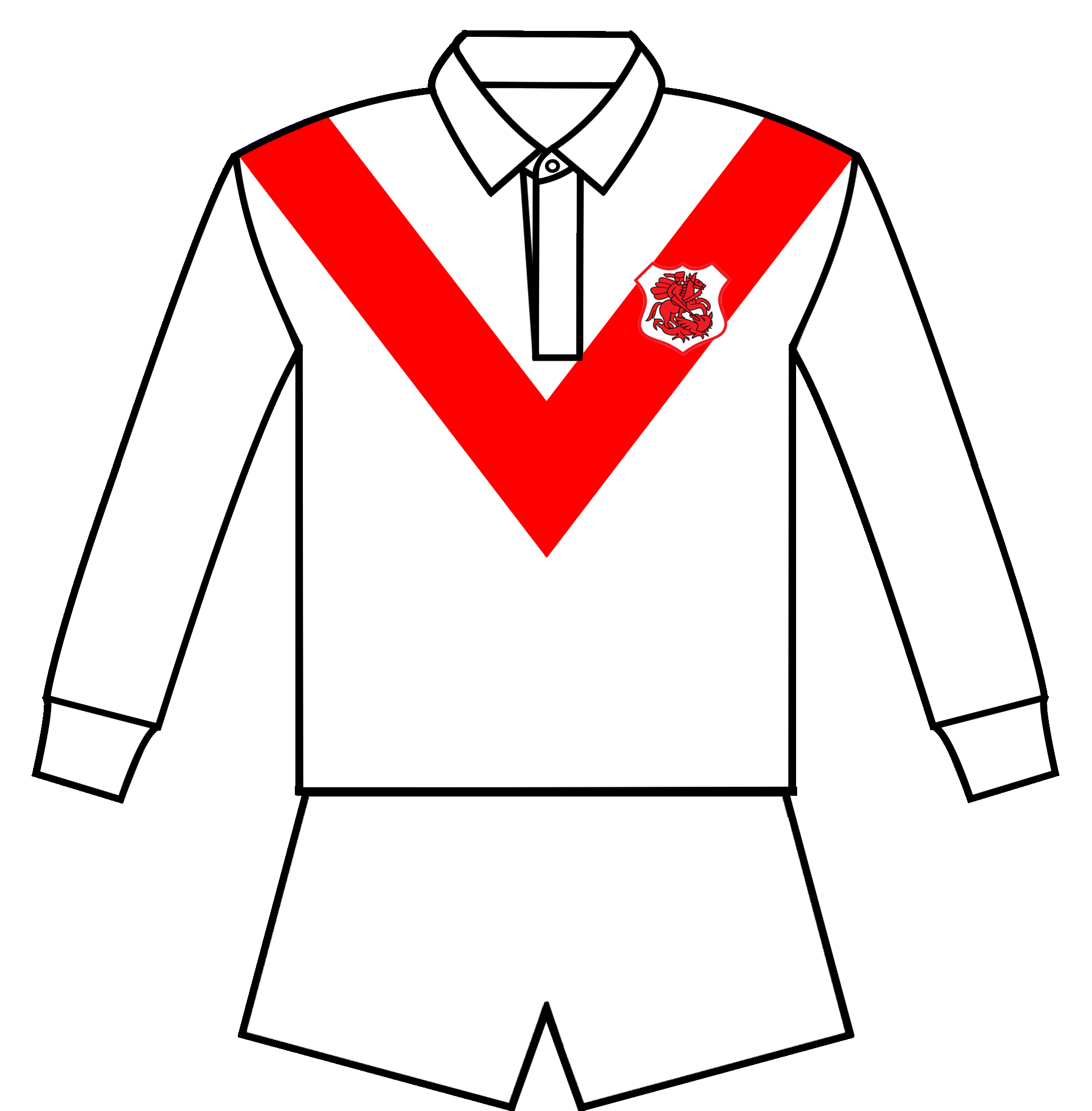
Balmain 63rd season Ground: Leichhardt Oval; Coach: Leo Nosworthy; Captain: Keith Outten	Canterbury-Bankstown 36th season Ground: Belmore Sports Ground; Coach: Kevin Ryan; Captain: Ron Raper	Cronulla-Sutherland Sharks 4th season Ground: Endeavour Field; Captain-coach: Tommy Bishop	Eastern Suburbs 63rd season Ground: Sydney Sports Ground; Coach: Don Furner; Captain: John Brass
Manly-Warringah 24th season Ground: Brookvale Oval; Coach: Ron Willey; Captain: John McDonald	Newtown 63rd season Ground: Henson Park; Coach: Harry Bath; Captain: Oscar Danielson	North Sydney 63rd season Ground: North Sydney Oval; Coach: Roy Francis; Captain: Ken Irvine	Parramatta 24th season Ground: Cumberland Oval; Captain-coach: Ron Lynch
Penrith 4th season Ground: Penrith Stadium; Captain-coach: Bob Boland	South Sydney 63rd season Ground: Redfern Oval; Coach: Clive Churchill; Captain: John Sattler	St. George 50th season Ground: Jubilee Oval; Coach: Jack Gibson; Captain: Graeme Langlands	Western Suburbs 63rd season Ground: Lidcombe Oval; Coach: Ron Watson; Captain: Roy Ferguson

=== Ladder ===
	Team	Pld	W	D	L	PF	PA	PD	Pts
1	South Sydney	22	17	1	4	479	273	+206	35
2	Manly	22	16	1	5	422	285	+137	33
3	St. George	22	15	0	7	408	329	+79	30
4	Canterbury	22	14	0	8	308	269	+39	28
5	Eastern Suburbs	22	13	0	9	386	320	+66	26
6	Balmain	22	12	1	9	380	347	+33	25
7	Cronulla	22	9	0	13	374	335	+39	18
8	Newtown	22	9	0	13	345	409	-64	18
9	North Sydney	22	7	1	14	332	435	-103	15
10	Penrith	22	7	1	14	292	406	-114	15
11	Western Suburbs	22	6	1	15	329	403	-74	13
12	Parramatta	22	4	0	18	240	484	-244	8

== Finals ==
Home	Score	Away	Match Information
Home	Score	Away	Date and Time	Venue	Referee	Crowd
Semi-finals
St. George	12–7	Canterbury-Bankstown	29 August 1970	Sydney Cricket Ground	Keith Page	40,083
South Sydney	22–15	Manly-Warringah	5 September 1970	Sydney Cricket Ground	Don Lancashire	40,211
Preliminary Final
Manly-Warringah	15–6	St. George	12 September 1970	Sydney Cricket Ground	Don Lancashire	43,147
Grand Final
South Sydney	23–12	Manly-Warringah	19 September 1970	Sydney Cricket Ground	Don Lancashire	53,241

=== Grand Final ===
South Sydney	Position	Manly-Warringah
1. Eric Simms	FB	1. Bob Batty
2. Michael Cleary	WG	2. Derek Moritz
3. Arthur Branighan	CE	3. Bob Fulton
4. Paul Sait	CE	4. Alec Tennant
5. Ray Branighan	WG	5. John McDonald (c)
6. Denis Pittard	FE	6. Ian Martin
7. Bob Grant	HB	7. Ed Whiley
13. John Sattler (c)	PR	13. Bill Hamilton
12. Elwyn Walters	HK	12. Fred Jones
11. John O'Neill	PR	11. John Bucknall
10. Bob McCarthy	SR	36. Lindsay Drake
9. Gary Stevens	SR	9. John Morgan
8. Ron Coote	LK	8. Rob Cameron
Bob Honan	Reserve	16. Allan Thomson
Clive Churchill	Coach	Ron Willey

Having lost the previous Grand Final to Balmain, Souths was desperate to win this year. After four minutes the Rabbitohs had scored. Approximately five minutes later Souths captain John Sattler collapsed, having been punched in an off-the-ball incident by Manly forward John Bucknall. He suffered a double fracture to his jaw but pleaded to teammate Mike Cleary, "Hold me up so they don't know I'm hurt". He was helped up and continued to play in the game. At half-time Souths was leading 12–6 when his teammates learnt about his injury.

During the interval Sattler refused treatment and insisted he continue playing. He also told the side, "the next bloke who tries to cut me out of the play is in trouble", to prevent his teammates trying to protect him from further injury. The Souths forward pack returned to the fray and completely dominated the play with its backline hardly called upon. Bucknall had been replaced by Allan Thomson in the 35th minute after a sustained punitive attention from the Rabbitohs pack saw him suffer a shoulder injury in a heavy tackle.

South Sydney halfback Bob Grant opened the scoring in the fourth minute, crossing untouched while his opposite number Eddie Whiley was off the field having an injury treated. Rabbitohs winger Ray Branighan also crossed untouched six minutes from full-time. By game's end South Sydney had scored three tries to nil in a 23–12 victory. Sattler later went to hospital to receive treatment but only after receiving the J. J. Giltinan Shield and making an acceptance speech.

Eric Simms' record of four field-goals that day stands as the most ever kicked in a Grand Final.

South Sydney 23 (Tries: Grant 2, R Branighan. Goals: Simms 3. Field Goals: Simms 4)

defeated

Manly-Warringah 12 (Goals: Batty 4. Field Goals: Fulton 2)

== Player statistics ==
The following statistics are as of the conclusion of Round 22.

Top 5 point scorers

Points	Player	Tries	Goals	Field Goals
217	Eric Simms	3	90	14
202	George Taylforth	4	95	0
179	Allan McKean	7	78	1
153	Peter Inskip	1	72	3
150	Bob Batty	2	66	6

Top 5 try scorers

Tries	Player
16	Ken Irvine
15	Bob McCarthy
13	Kevin Junee
13	Brian Moore
12	Don Rogers

Top 5 goal scorers

Goals	Player
95	George Taylforth
90	Eric Simms
78	Allan McKean
72	Peter Inskip
66	Bob Batty
