= 1970 Eastern Suburbs season =

← 1969	1971 →

The 1970 Eastern Suburbs season was the 63rd in the club's history. They competed in the New South Wales Rugby League's 1970 premiership.

== Details ==
- Home Ground:- The Sydney Sports Ground.
- Coach:- Don Furner
- Captain:- John Brass

Ian Baker, John Ballesty, Cliff Boyd, John Brass, Alan Cardy, John Dykes, Laurie Freier, Graham Gardiner, Kevin Goldspink, Les Hayes, Jim Hall, Mark Harris, Kevin Junee, Johnny Mayes, Allan McKean, Jim Morgan, Peter Moscatt, Bill Mullins, Louis Neumann, John Peard, Jim Porter, Barry Reilly, Ron Saddler

== Ladder ==
	Team	Pld	W	D	L	PF	PA	PD	Pts
1	South Sydney	22	17	1	4	479	273	+206	35
2	Manly-Warringah	22	16	1	5	422	285	+137	33
3	St. George	22	15	0	7	408	329	+79	30
4	Canterbury-Bankstown	22	14	0	8	308	269	+39	28
5	Eastern Suburbs	22	13	0	9	386	320	+66	26
6	Balmain	22	12	1	9	380	347	+33	25
7	Cronulla-Sutherland	22	9	0	13	374	335	+39	18
8	Newtown	22	9	0	13	345	409	-64	18
9	North Sydney	22	7	1	14	332	435	-103	15
10	Penrith	22	7	1	14	292	406	-114	15
11	Western Suburbs	22	6	1	15	329	403	-74	13
12	Parramatta	22	4	0	18	240	484	-244	8

== Season summary ==
- Eastern Suburbs won the Club Championship.

Preceded by 1969	Season; 1970	Succeeded by 1971
