= Bradstock =

Bradstock is a surname. Notable people with the surname include:

- Carla Bradstock (born 1985), Canadian volleyball player and coach
- John Bradstock (born 1950), Australian rugby league player
- Roald Bradstock (born 1962), English javelin thrower

== See also ==
- Burton Bradstock, a village in Dorset, England
