= Laurie Freier =

Australian RL coach and former rugby league footballer

Playing information
- Position: Second-row
Club
Years	Team	Pld	T	G	FG	P
1970–74	Eastern Suburbs	53	10	0	0	30
1975–76	Manly-Warringah	9	0	0	0	0
	Total	62	10	0	0	30

Coaching information
Club
Years	Team	Gms	W	D	L	W%
1983–84	Eastern Suburbs	51	19	2	30	37
1988	Western Suburbs	16	2	1	13	13
	Total	67	21	3	43	31

Laurie Freier is an Australian former professional rugby league footballer and coach. He played in Sydney's NSWRFL Premiership for the Eastern Suburbs and Manly-Warringah clubs during the 1970s, later coaching Easts as well as the Western Suburbs Magpies during the 1980s. He is also the father of former rugby union international Adam Freier.

== Playing ==
Freier began his first grade New South Wales Rugby Football League premiership career in 1970 with the Eastern Suburbs club. He played from the bench in Easts' loss to Manly-Warringah in the 1972 Grand Final, coming on in the second half to replace injured Greg Bandiera. Moving to the Manly-Warringah club two years later, Freier managed a handful of first grade appearances in 1975 and 1976 before retiring.

== Coaching ==
Freier coached Western Suburbs in the lower grades, winning the reserve grade premiership in 1981. In his initial year of first-grade coaching, with Eastern Suburbs, Freier was named coach of the year for the 1983 NSWRFL season. He stopped coaching Easts at the end of the following season when the club finished second last. Freier started the 1988 Winfield Cup season as Western Suburbs Magpies coach but was replaced during the season by John Bailey after winning just two of sixteen games.
