= John Quayle (rugby league) =

Australia international rugby league footballer & administrator

Personal information
- Full name: John Arthur Quayle
- Born: 14 February 1947 (age 79) Walgett, New South Wales, Australia

Playing information
- Position: Lock, Second-row
Club
Years	Team	Pld	T	G	FG	P
1966–67	Manilla
1968–72	Eastern Suburbs	51	9	0	0	27
1973–76	Parramatta	57	13	0	0	39
	Total	108	22	0	0	66
Representative
Years	Team	Pld	T	G	FG	P
1973	City NSW	1	0	0	0	0
1973	New South Wales	2	1	0	0	3
1975	Australia	3	1	0	0	3

John Quayle (born 14 February 1947) is an Australian former professional rugby league footballer who played in the 1960s and 1970s, and administrator in the 1980s and 1990s. An Australia national and New South Wales state representative lock or second-row forward, he played in the NSWRFL Premiership for the Eastern Suburbs and Parramatta clubs. Following his retirement Quayle became the NSWRL's first General Manager and later the ARL's chief executive officer.

== Playing ==
Quayle began playing football in country New South Wales with Manilla's rugby league club as a boy, playing all his junior football with the local club. He rose through the ranks of all grades and joined Sydney's Eastern Suburbs team in 1968. At the end of the 1972 NSWRFL season he played for Easts as a second-row forward in their grand final loss to Manly-Warringah. The following season Quayle joined Parramatta and also was selected to play for Sydney then New South Wales. He was selected to play for Australia in the 1975 Rugby League World Series, becoming Kangaroo No. 491.

== Administration ==
Quayle was appointed the first General Manager of the NSWRL. It was in this capacity that he, as well as Don Furner and two St. George legends, John Raper and Reg Gasnier, chose Dragons lock Brad Mackay, despite being on the 1993 NSWRL season grand final's losing side, to be awarded the Clive Churchill Medal as man-of-the-match, with Queensland premier Wayne Goss questioning the decision.

At the end of the 1996 ARL season, Quayle resigned as ARL chief executive and was replaced by Balmain president (and former hooker) Neil Whittaker, who would become the first CEO of the National Rugby League. Quayle later worked for SOCOG as Head of Venue Management during the 2000 Summer Olympics.
