= Don Rogers (rugby league) =

Australian rugby league footballer

Personal information
- Full name: Don Rogers
- Born: 5 December 1947 (age 77)

Playing information
- Position: Wing
Club
Years	Team	Pld	T	G	FG	P
1969–72	Western Suburbs	50	38	0	0	114
1973–74	Canterbury-Bankstown	27	12	0	0	36
1975–76	Western Suburbs	49	10	0	0	30
	Total	126	60	0	0	180
- Source: As of 4 July 2019

Don Rogers nicknamed "Chimpy" is an Australian former rugby league footballer who played in the 1960s and 1970s. He played for the Western Suburbs Magpies and Canterbury-Bankstown in the New South Wales Rugby League (NSWRL) competition.

== Playing career ==
Rogers made his first grade debut for Western Suburbs in 1969. Between 1970 and 1972, Rogers finished as the club's top try scorer although his time at Wests was not very successful with the side finishing last in 1971.

In 1973, Rogers joined Canterbury-Bankstown and played every game in his first season at the club including their semi final defeat against Newtown. The following year, Rogers was limited to only 4 games and did not play in Canterbury's grand final defeat against Eastern Suburbs.

In 1975, Rogers returned to Western Suburbs and played 2 seasons with the club before retiring at the end of 1976.
