= Rob Cameron =

Australian rugby league footballer

Personal information
- Full name: Robert Cameron

Playing information
- Position: Lock
Club
Years	Team	Pld	T	G	FG	P
1963–72	Manly-Warringah	87	16	0	0	48
- Source: As of 5 April 2019

Rob Cameron is an Australian former rugby league footballer who played in the 1960s and 1970s. He played for Manly-Warringah in the New South Wales Rugby League (NSWRL) competition. He is the grandnephew of former North Sydney player Carl Arneman who played in the 1920s and 1930s.

== Playing career ==
Cameron made his first grade debut for Manly in 1963. Cameron missed out on playing in Manly's 1968 grand final defeat against South Sydney. In 1969, Manly reached the finals but were defeated by eventual premiers Balmain 15-14.

In 1970, Manly reached the grand final the opponents were South Sydney. Cameron played at lock as Manly were defeated by Souths 23-12. Cameron played with Manly up until the end of 1972 and then retired. He missed out on selection in the club's maiden premiership victory over Eastern Suburbs.
