= John Armstrong (rugby league) =

Australian rugby league footballer (1945-1998)

Personal information
- Full name: John William Armstrong
- Born: 4 November 1945 Summer Hill, New South Wales, Australia
- Died: 30 January 1998 (aged 52)

Playing information
- Position: wing, prop
Club
Years	Team	Pld	T	G	FG	P
1964–70	Western Suburbs	81	13	10	0	59
1971	Canterbury	20	4	0	0	12
1972–73	Eastern Suburbs	36	5	0	0	15
	Total	137	22	10	0	86

John Armstrong was a rugby league footballer in the New South Wales Rugby League (NSWRL) Competition.

After representing New South Wales (NSW) at a junior level Armstrong began his senior career playing for the Western Suburbs (1964–65) (1967–70) club. Originally a right wing Armstrong developed into a tough, uncompromising prop. Armstrong also played for the Canterbury-Bankstown (1971) and Eastern Suburbs (1972–73) clubs. Armstrong was a member of Easts 1972 Grand Final side that was beaten by Manly-Warringah, he had a try disallowed in the controversial decider.

Armstrong, in total, played 137 1st grade matches in the NSWRL competition before moving to Brisbane to play out his career with the Wests club.

The front-rower was a hotelier by profession and at the time of his death managed several hotels.

== Sources ==
- The Encyclopedia of Rugby League Players; Alan Whiticker & Glen Hudson
- Rugby League Yearbook; Dave Middleton
