= Harry Cameron (rugby league) =

Australian rugby league footballer (1947–2021)

Personal information
- Born: 2 August 1947 Burren Junction, New South Wales, Australia
- Died: 20 June 2021 (aged 73)

Playing information
- Position: Centre
Club
Years	Team	Pld	T	G	FG	P
	Narrabri
1971–74	Eastern Suburbs	55	4	0	0	12
1975–76	Wests (Brisbane)
	Total	55	4	0	0	12
Representative
Years	Team	Pld	T	G	FG	P
1975–76	Queensland	5	0	0	0	0

Coaching information
Club
Years	Team	Gms	W	D	L	W%
1980	Western Suburbs	21	3	1	17	14

Harry Cameron (2 August 1947 – 20 June 2021) was an Australian professional rugby league footballer who played for Eastern Suburbs in the New South Wales Rugby League (NSWRL) competition and Wests Brisbane in the Brisbane Rugby League. He primarily played at centre.

== Playing career ==
Initially approached by Cronulla-Sutherland when he was playing for Narrabri, Cameron was eventually signed by Eastern Suburbs in 1971.

Cameron was selected to represent Queensland in five games against New South Wales in 1975 and 1976.

Cameron played in four grand finals, two with Eastern Suburbs (a loss to Manly in 1972 and a win over Canterbury in 1974) and two back-to-back wins with Wests Brisbane in 1975 and 1976.
