= John Bradstock =

Australian rugby league footballer (1950–2025)

Personal information
- Full name: John Bradstock
- Born: 13 January 1950 (age 76) Sydney, Australia
- Died: September 2025

Playing information
- Position: Winger
Club
Years	Team	Pld	T	G	FG	P
1972–1976	Newtown	51	30	45	0	180
Representative
Years	Team	Pld	T	G	FG	P
1972	New South Wales	1	0	0	0	0

John Bradstock (13 January 1950 – September 2025) was an Australian rugby league footballer who played for Newtown in the 1970s.

John Bradstock 1976

== Playing career ==
Bradstock was a winger for the Newtown club for five seasons in the 1970s and was the leading tryscorer in first grade for the 1972 season. He also represented New South Wales on one occasion during his debut season. His brothers Barry and Kevin also played first grade for Newtown

Playing under the guidance of legendary coach Harry Bath, Bradstock enjoyed a sensational debut season in 1972. He finished the year as the NSWRL first-grade competition's joint leading try-scorer with 18 tries, matching the tally of future Immortal Bob Fulton. His exceptional form that season earned him selection to represent New South Wales on one occasion. Over the course of his career, Bradstock made 53 first-grade appearances for Newtown and was a member of the club's 1973 Wills Cup-winning squad.

Bradstock retired in 1977 and died in September 2025.
