= Peter Inskip =

Australian rugby league footballer

Playing information
- Position: Fullback
Club
Years	Team	Pld	T	G	FG	P
1970–71	Canterbury-Bankstown	31	2	97	3	206
1972	North Sydney	22	3	62	1	134
	Total	53	5	159	4	340
Representative
Years	Team	Pld	T	G	FG	P
1968	NSW Country Firsts	1	0	2	0	4

Peter Inskip is an Australian former professional rugby league footballer who played for Canterbury-Bankstown and North Sydney in the NSWRL.

== Career ==
A fullback, Inskip spent his early career in Tamworth and in 1968 represented NSW Country Firsts. He also went on a tour of New Zealand that year with a NSW Country squad.

Inskip transferred to Canterbury in 1970, slotting in at fullback due to an injury to Les Johns, who he also replaced as goal-kicker. He was a permanent fixture in the team in 1970 and featured in Canterbury's finals series. Johns returned from injury in 1971 which restricted Inskip's first-grade appearances and he ended the year with a reserves premiership.

In 1972 he crossed over to North Sydney, where he was the regular first-grade fullback. A left-footer, Inskip kicked a club record equalling 10 goals in North Sydney's round three win over Penrith and in round 10 booted the winning field goal in the last minute to defeated his former club Canterbury.
