= John Ballesty =

Australian rugby league footballer

Personal information
- Full name: John Patrick Ballesty
- Born: 20 May 1945 (age 81) Strathfield, New South Wales, Australia

Playing information

Rugby union
Club
Years	Team	Pld	T	G	FG	P
	Eastwood	0	0	0	0	0
Representative
Years	Team	Pld	T	G	FG	P
1968–69	Australia	0	0	0	0	0

Rugby league
- Position: Stand-off, Loose forward
Club
Years	Team	Pld	T	G	FG	P
1970–73	Eastern Suburbs	0	11	22	1	79
Representative
Years	Team	Pld	T	G	FG	P
1975–77	NSW Country	0	0	0	0	0

Coaching information
Club
Years	Team	Gms	W	D	L	W%
1980	Eastwood	0	0	0	0
- As of 12 Jul 2021

John Patrick Ballesty (born 20 May 1945) is an Australian former national representative rugby union player who also played first-grade rugby league with the Eastern Suburbs club.

== Rugby union ==
Ballesty was schooled at St.Patrick's College Strathfield, at the time they played rugby league not rugby union. He left school and initially played rugby union for Sydney Teachers College (STC). En masse a group of STC players joined Eastwood rugby culminating in a grand final loss in 1966 against a strong Randwick team brimming with Wallabies including Ken Catchpole.

Ballesty was Eastwood's first Wallaby test player and the third Australian national representative to come from the Eastwood Rugby Club when he debuted against the All Blacks in Sydney in June 1968. Ballesty had replaced Wallaby great Phil Hawthorne who had switched to rugby league and the St. George Dragons. That test All Black great Coin Meads tore the hamstring of Wallaby great Ken Catchpole. The injury so severe it prematurely retired Catchpole from the game and he never played again. That same year he kicked the match winning field goal in a Test match against the France. He played in 9 tests between 1968 and 1969 for the Wallabies at fly-half before switching codes again back to rugby league. He captained Australia in three minor matches in 1969.

Ballesty returned to the Eastwood Rugby Union Club in 1980 where he held the role of Secretary-Manager and coach for two years. In that time he lifted Eastwood into First Division with the help of young future Wallabies Brett Papworth, Ian Williams and Steve Tuynman. Papworth later mirrored Ballesty's career leaving Eastwood to join the Roosters.

== Rugby league ==
In 1970 Ballesty joined the Eastern Suburbs club alongside former Wallaby teammates John Brass and Alan Cardy. In 1972 he was a try-scorer in the Roosters side that lost to Manly Warringah in that year's Grand final and he received the Player of the Year award from Australian rugby league's major publication, Rugby League Week. In 1972 former Wallaby and current Kangaroo Phil Hawthorne joined the Roosters but Ballesty kept Hawthorne in reserve grade. While at Easts he trained in club management before leaving to play for the Queanbeyan Blues under his Roosters coach Don Furner at the end of the 1973 season. Ballesty played NSW Country Firsts 1975–77, in 1975 when City-Country wasn't origin based but where you played, Country defeated City 19–9 in a great upset. Country was led by past Sydney premiership players Jim Morgan and Ballesty. Future star Michael Cronin kicked 5 goals. The City side contained 4 players later named in the team of the century Graeme Langlands, Robert Fulton, Ron Coote and Arthur Beetson. Country never defeated City again until the rules were changed to origin of birth. Much like the State teams in rugby league. Playing in the country meant Ballesty wasn't seen by state and national selectors regularly enough to be picked. He retired in 1979.

In 1982 Ballesty joined the Canterbury Bankstown Leagues Club in 1982 as General Manager. At the time the Bulldogs were close to insolvency and the team on the brink of folding. By 2000 it was financially Australia's largest single licensed club.

In 2018 Ballesty returned to the Bulldogs as a director of the football club.

== Personal ==
He is married with 4 children, Martin, Brendan, Scott and Kate.

== Bibliography ==
- Howell, Max (2005) Born to Lead – Wallaby Test Captains, Celebrity Books, Auckland NZ
- Whiticker, Alan & Hudson, Glen (2006) The Encyclopedia of Rugby League Players, Gavin Allen Publishing, Sydney
