= Allan McKean =

Australia international rugby league footballer

Personal information
- Full name: Allan McKean
- Born: 11 December 1942 (age 82); Sydney, New South Wales, Australia

Playing information
- Position: Fullback
Club
Years	Team	Pld	T	G	FG	P
1965	St. George	1	0	2	0	4
1966	Norths (Wollongong)
1967–73	Eastern Suburbs	120	18	422	3	903
1975	St. George	2	0	4	0	8
	Total	123	18	428	3	915
Representative
Years	Team	Pld	T	G	FG	P
1970	Australia	1		7		14
- Source: As of 31 October 2019

Allan McKean (born 1942) is an Australian former professional rugby league footballer who played in the 1960s and 1970s.

== Career ==
The fullback spent the first year of his career in Third Grade for St George in 1963, his local club – his side won the premiership in 1963. A prolific goal kicker, McKean, a St George Junior, spent the 1966 season at Wollongong's Wests club before joining Sydney's Easts club where he played for seven seasons. McKean played for the St George in 1965 and 1975, and Eastern Suburbs between 1967 and 1973. He made one national representative appearance for Australia in the third test against Great Britain in 1970. He kicked seven goals in the match. In 1967 McKean joined the Eastern Suburbs club, playing over 100 matches for Eastern Suburbs over the next 7 years and making one representative appearance for Australia on 4 July 1970, in which he received a knee in the back from Malcolm "Mal" Reilly.

For the 1972 season, he was the NSW Rugby Football League's top point scorer when he scored 220 points, helping the Roosters into the Grand Final where they went down 14–19 to the Manly-Warringah Sea Eagles.

McKean for many years held the record of the most points for the Eastern Suburbs club – 903 points from 18 tries, 422 goals and 3 Field goals, established in 1973. The total wasn't eclipsed until the 2006 season when goal kicking backrower Craig Fitzgibbon, passed the mark.

He was forced out of Eastern Suburbs in 1973, due to the league's controversial 13-import rule restrictions at the time. In 1975, he reappeared, and as a local junior, McKean returned to the St George Club for his final season, as an occasional stand-in fullback for Graeme Langlands. He was signed for 2 years at the beginning of January 1975, but by season's end he decided to retire.
