= Greg Bandiera =

Australian rugby league footballer

Personal information
- Full name: Gregory Bandiera
- Born: 8 September 1949 (age 77) Atherton, Queensland, Australia

Playing information
- Position: Second-row, Five-eighth, Centre
Club
Years	Team	Pld	T	G	FG	P
1970–71	Newtown	18	2	0	0	6
1972–75	Eastern Suburbs	30	8	0	0	24
1976–77	Balmain	26	2	0	0	6
	Total	74	12	0	0	36
- Source: As of 18 April 2019

Greg Bandiera is an Australian former rugby league footballer who played in the 1970s. He played for Eastern Suburbs, Newtown and Balmain in the New South Wales Rugby League (NSWRL) competition.

== Playing career ==
Bandiera was originally from Atherton, Queensland but moved to Sydney and was signed by Newtown in 1970. Bandiera spent two seasons with Newtown before joining Eastern Suburbs in 1972. In 1972, Eastern Suburbs reached the grand final against Manly-Warringah. After only 20 minutes into the match, Bandiera broke his collar bone and was taken from the field. Easts went on to lose the grand final 19-14 with Manly winning their first ever premiership.

In 1974, Eastern Suburbs finished as minor premiers under the arrival of coach Jack Gibson. Easts went on to reach the 1974 NSWRL grand final against Canterbury-Bankstown. Bandiera was selected to play from the bench in the grand final as Eastern Suburbs won their first premiership in 29 years defeated Canterbury 19-4 at the Sydney Cricket Ground.

In 1975, Eastern Suburbs went on to claim the 1975 minor premiership and reach the 1975 NSWRL grand final against St George. Easts went on to win their second straight premiership defeating St George 38-0 at the Sydney Cricket Ground but Bandiera unfortunately missed out on selection to play in the game. The match is mainly remembered for the white boots worn by St George player Graeme Langlands. The 38-0 scoreline remained as the heaviest defeat in a grand final until Manly defeated Melbourne 40-0 in the 2008 decider.

In 1976, Bandiera joined Balmain. In his first season at the club, Balmain missed the finals. In his final season at the club, Bandiera made 11 appearances and retired at the end of 1977.

== Post playing ==
After retiring as a player, Bandiera went into club administration. In the early 1990s, Bandiera became general manager at the Gold Coast Seagulls but resigned at the end of 1993 due to a falling out with captain-coach Wally Lewis.
