= 1980 NSWRFL season =

Rugby league competition

1980 New South Wales Rugby Football League
- Teams: 12
- Premiers: Canterbury (3rd title)
- Minor premiers: Eastern Suburbs (14th title)
- Matches played: 138
- Points scored: 4415
- Total attendance: 1,498,634
- Top points scorer: Steve Gearin (220)
- Wooden spoon: Penrith (2nd spoon)
- Rothmans Medal: Geoff Bugden
- Top try-scorer(s): John Ribot (16); Wayne Wigham (16)

The 1980 New South Wales Rugby Football League premiership was the 73rd season of Sydney's professional rugby league football competition, Australia's first. Twelve clubs, including six of 1908's foundation teams and another six from around Sydney competed for the J.J. Giltinan Shield and WD & HO Wills Cup during the season, which culminated in a grand final between the Canterbury and Eastern Suburbs clubs. NSWRFL clubs also competed in the 1980 Tooth Cup and players from NSWRFL clubs were selected to represent the New South Wales team.

== Season summary ==
Twenty-two regular season rounds were played from March till August, resulting in a top five of Easts, Canterbury, Wests, St. George and Souths who battled it out in the finals.

Mid-way through the season, players contracted to NSWRFL clubs were selected to represent the New South Wales team in two games against the Queensland team in 1980. After that the experimental 1980 State of Origin game was played, and NSWRFL clubs' players represented Queensland for the first time. NSWRFL club players were also selected to go on the mid-season 1980 Kangaroo tour of New Zealand.

The 1980 season's Rothmans Medallist was Newtown prop Geoff Bugden. The inaugural Dally M Award, named in honour of rugby league's first "Master" Dally Messenger, went to South Sydney's Robert Laurie. Rugby League Week gave its player of the year award to Eastern Suburbs' halfback Kevin Hastings.

The 1980 season also saw the retirement from the League of future Australian Rugby League Hall of Fame inductee, Arthur Beetson.

The grand finals:

- Canterbury Bulldogs vs Eastern Suburbs Roosters (Senior Grade)
- Parramatta Eels vs Canterbury Bulldogs (Reserve Grade)
- South Sydney Rabbitohs vs Unknown Team (Under-21s Grade)
- Parramatta Eels vs Balmain Tigers (Mid-week)

The winners in all grades were:

- Canterbury Bulldogs (Senior Grade)
- Parramatta Eels (Reserve Grade)
- South Sydney Rabbitohs (Under-21s Grade)
- Parramatta Eels (Mid-week)

The State of Residence/State of Origin Series

- Queensland vs New South Wales

=== Teams ===
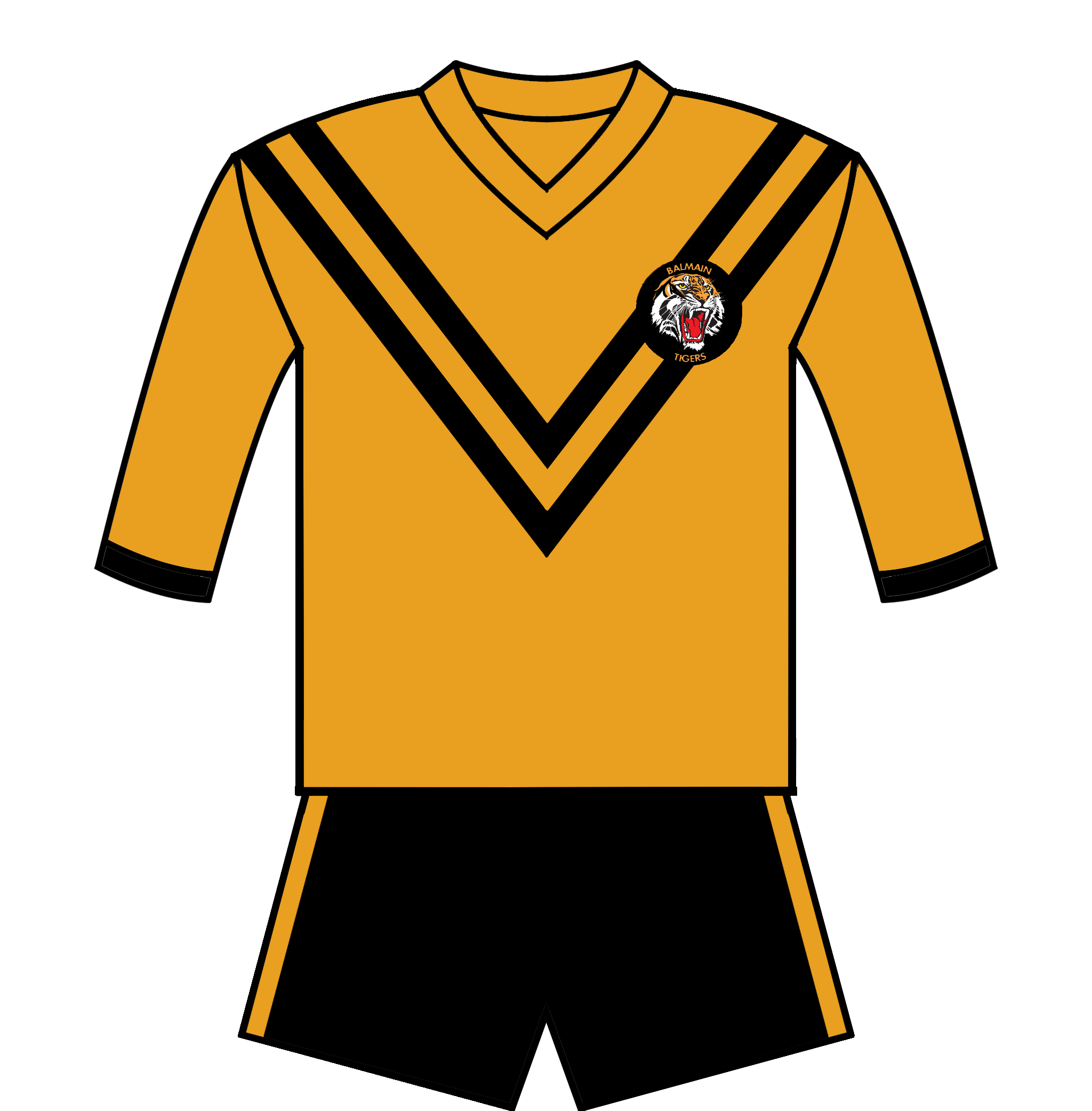
Balmain 73rd season Ground: Leichhardt Oval; Coach: Dennis Tutty; Captain: Allan McMahon

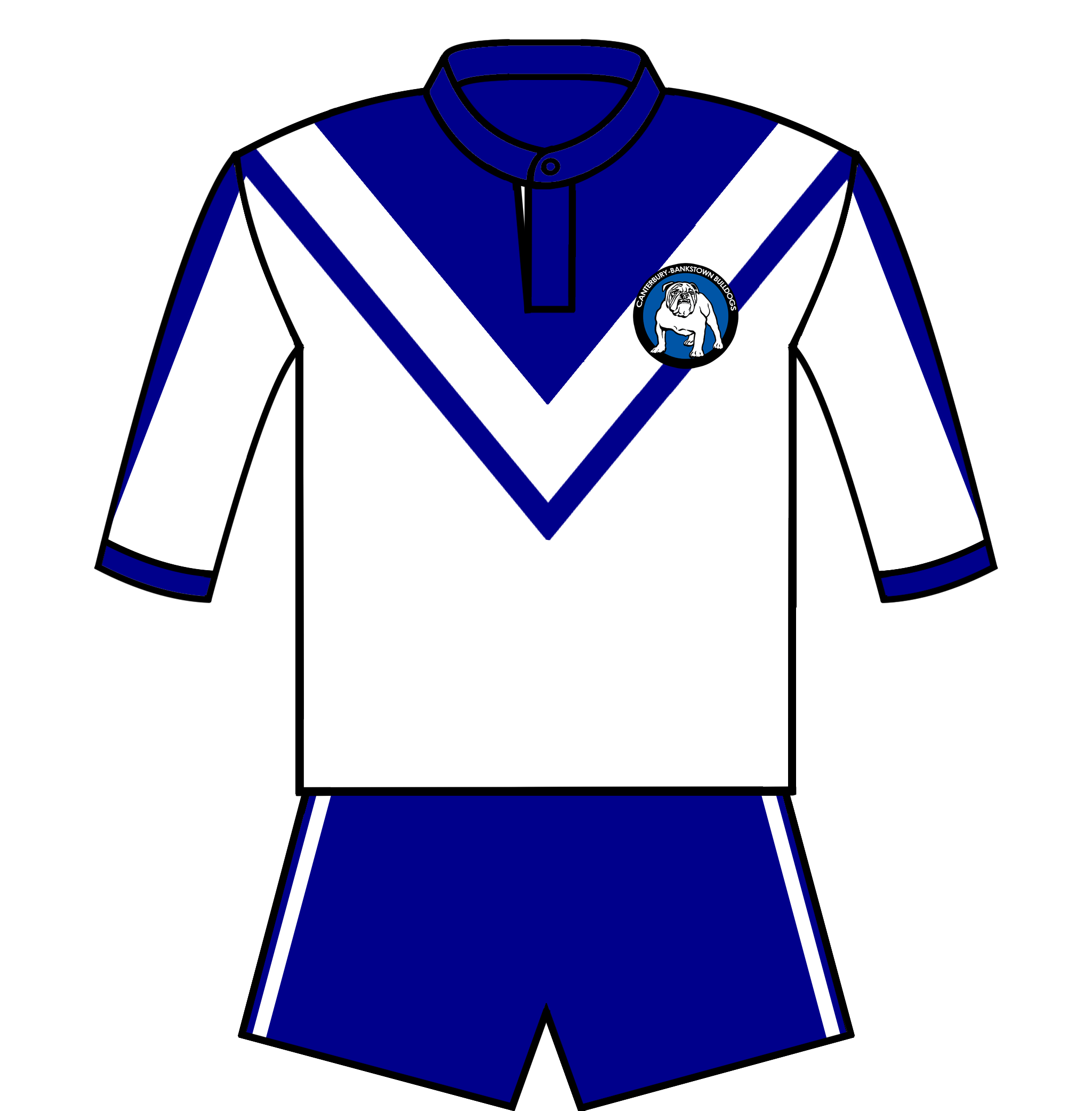
Canterbury-Bankstown 46th season Ground: Belmore Oval; Coach: Ted Glossop; Captain: George Peponis

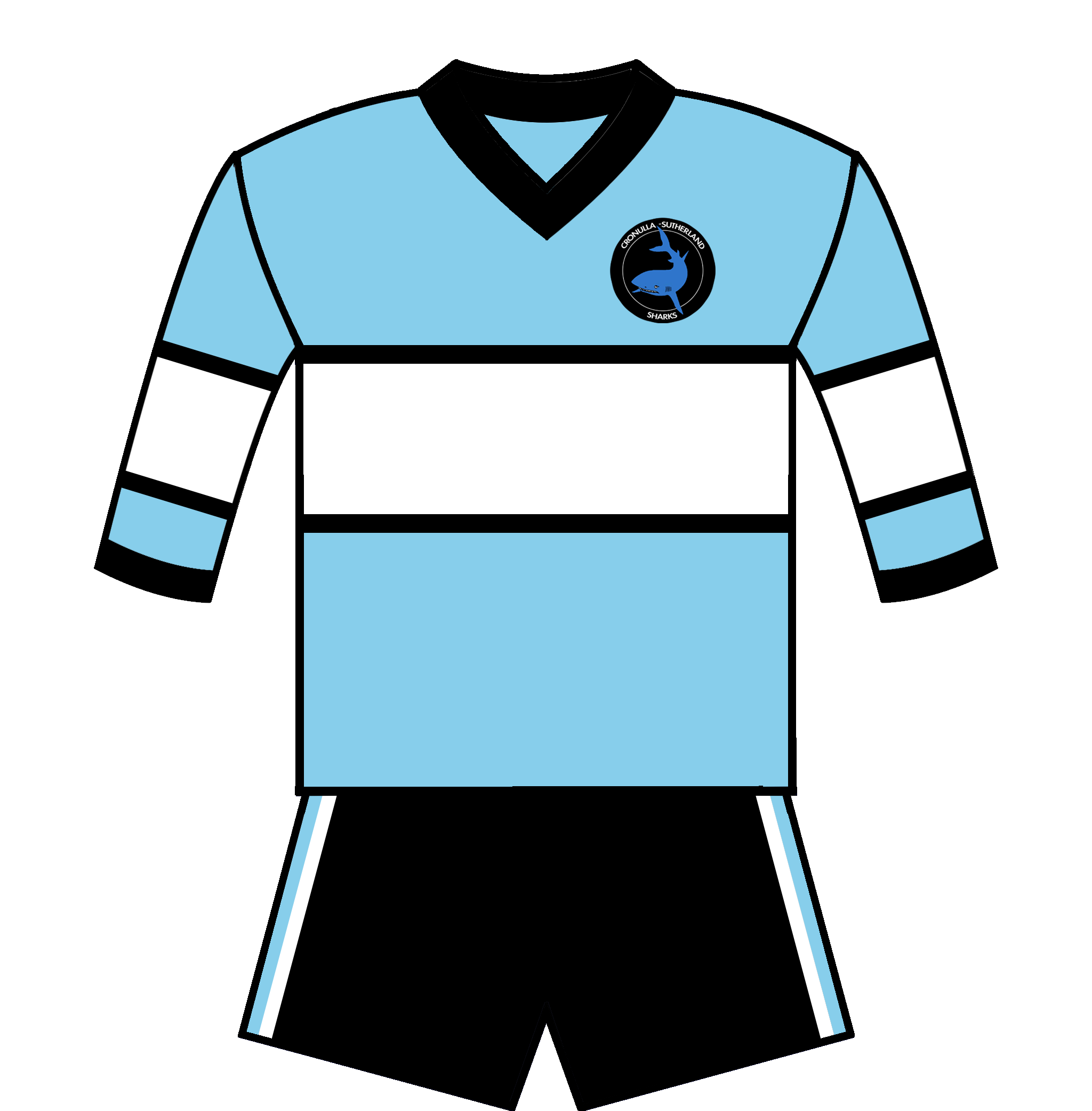
Cronulla-Sutherland 14th season Ground: Endeavour Field; Coach: Tommy Bishop; Captain: Greg Pierce

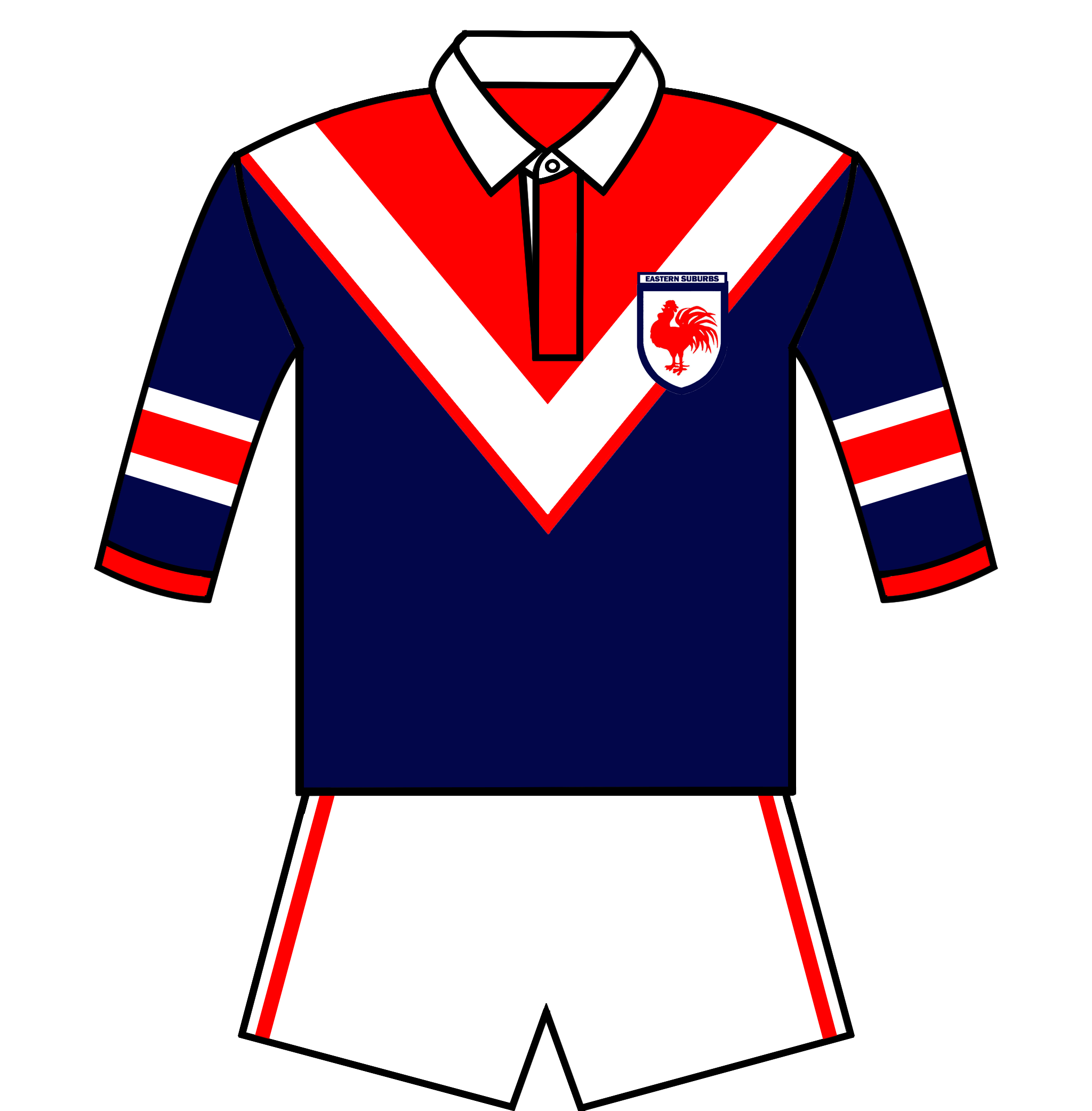
Eastern Suburbs 73rd season Ground: Sydney Sports Ground; Coach: Bob Fulton; Captain: Royce Ayliffe

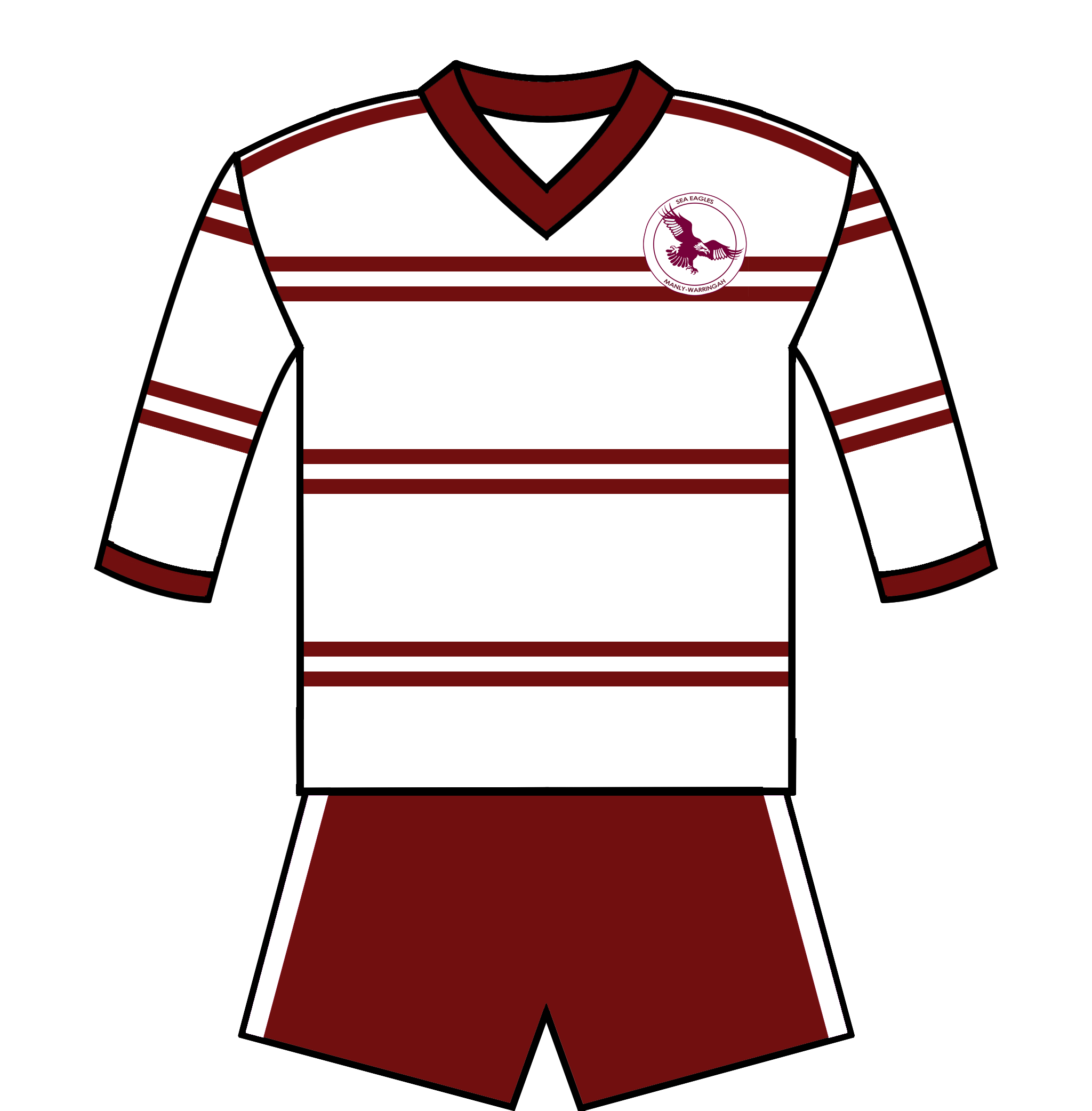
Manly-Warringah 34th season Ground: Brookvale Oval; Coach: Allan Thomson; Captain: Max Krilich→Graham Eadie

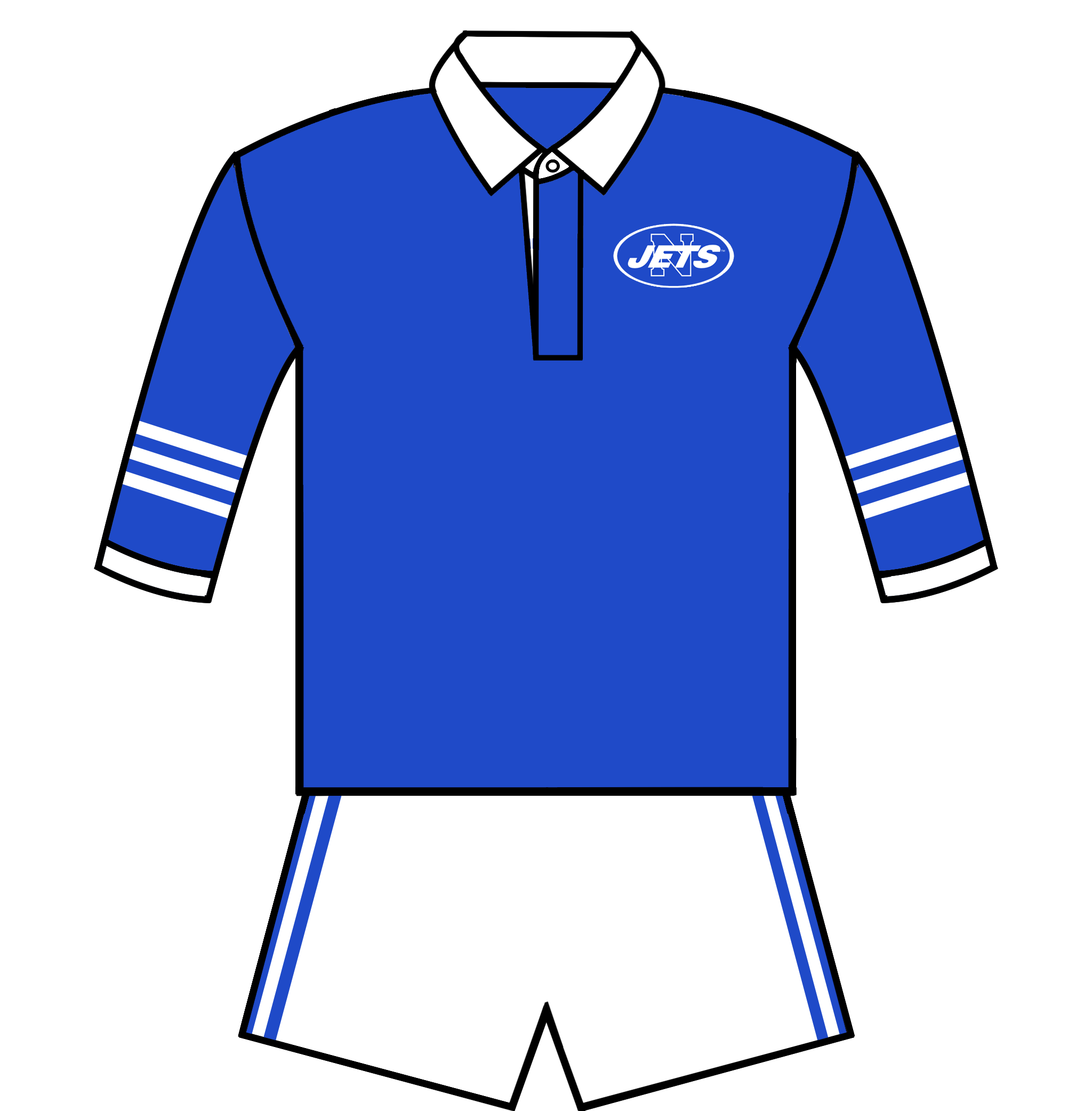
Newtown 73rd season Ground: Henson Park; Coach: Warren Ryan; Captain: Tommy Raudonikis

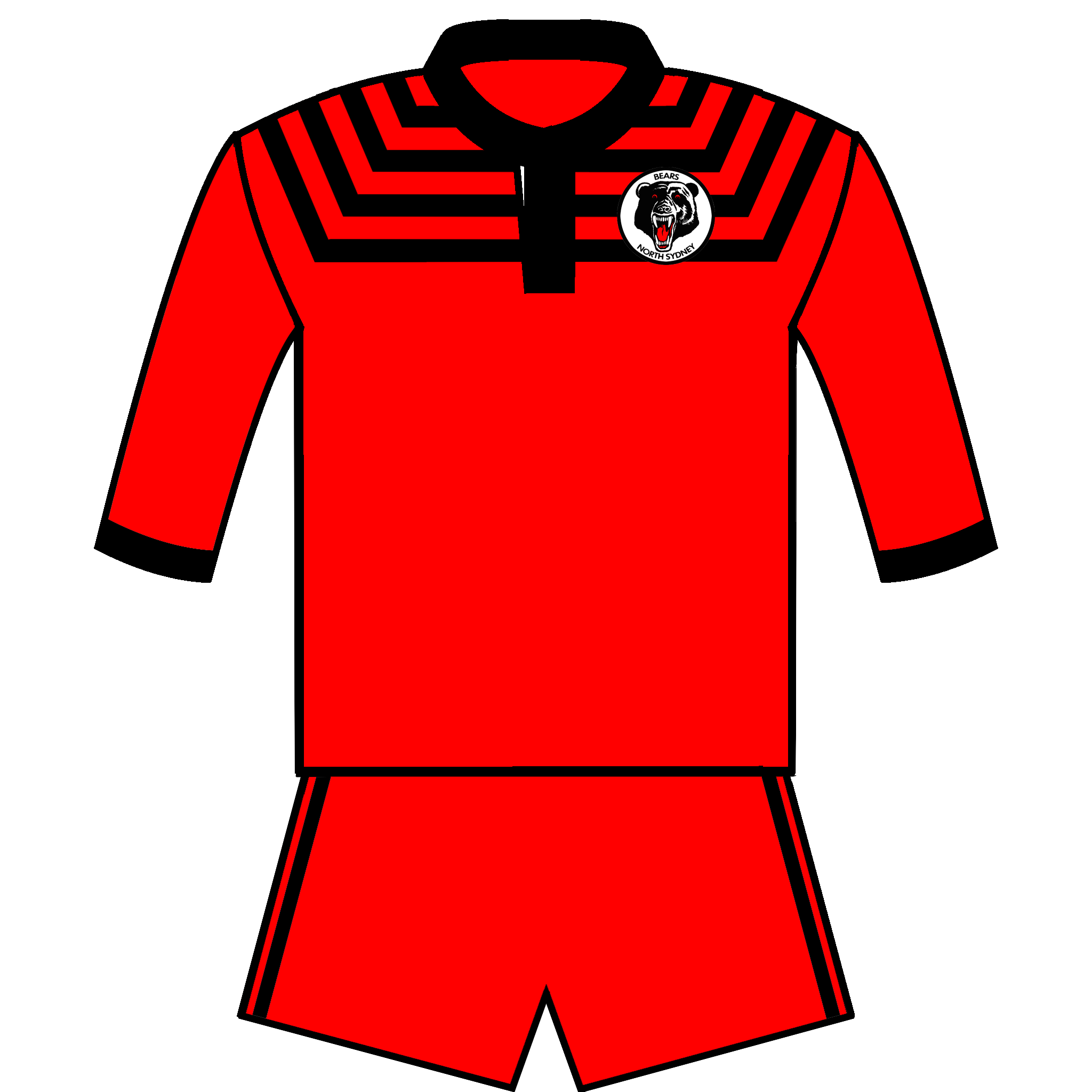
North Sydney 73rd season Ground:North Sydney Oval; Coach: Ron Willey; Captain: Kevin Wilson

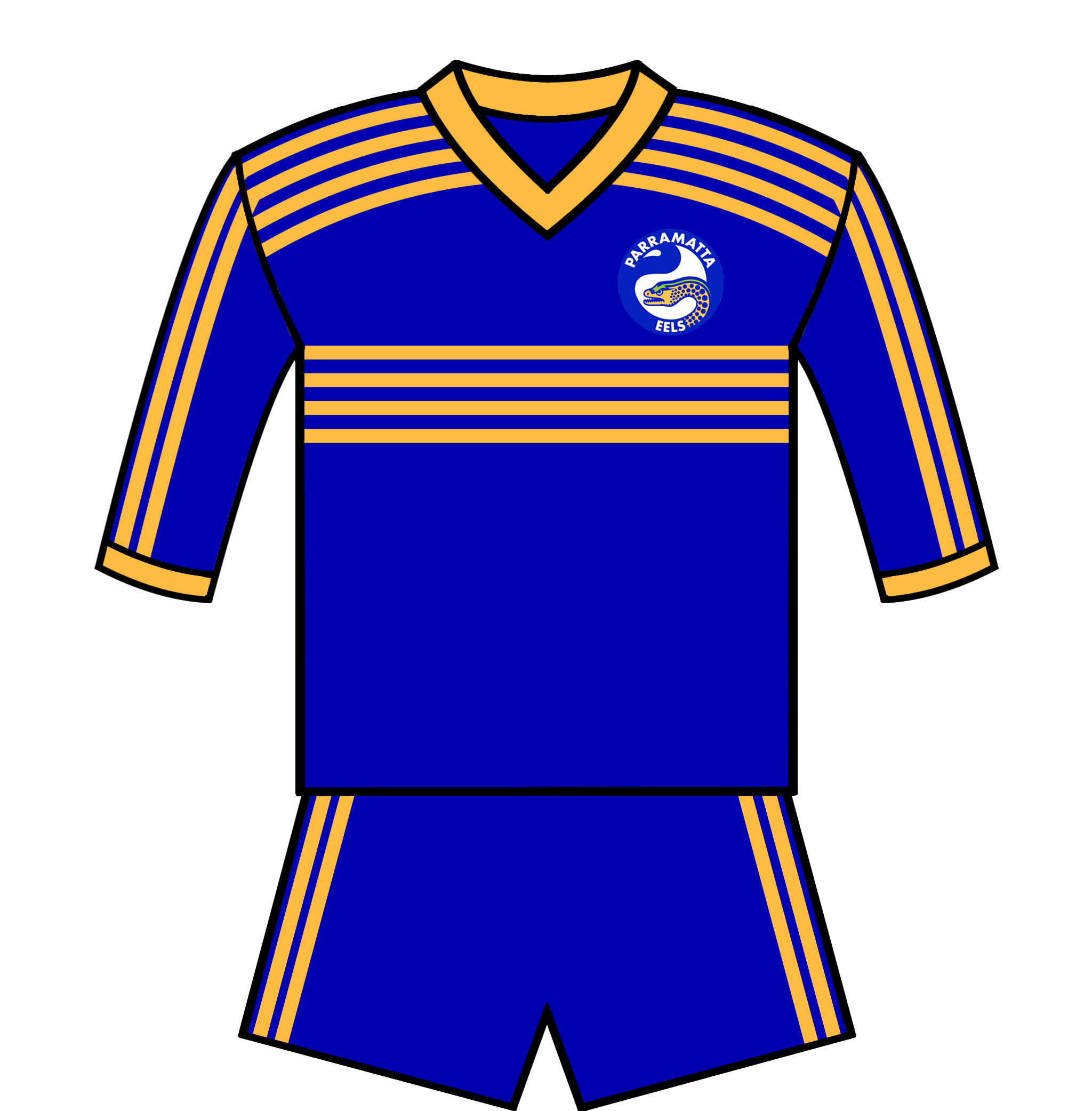
Parramatta 34th season Ground: Cumberland Oval; Coach: John Peard; Captain: Ray Price→Ron Hilditch

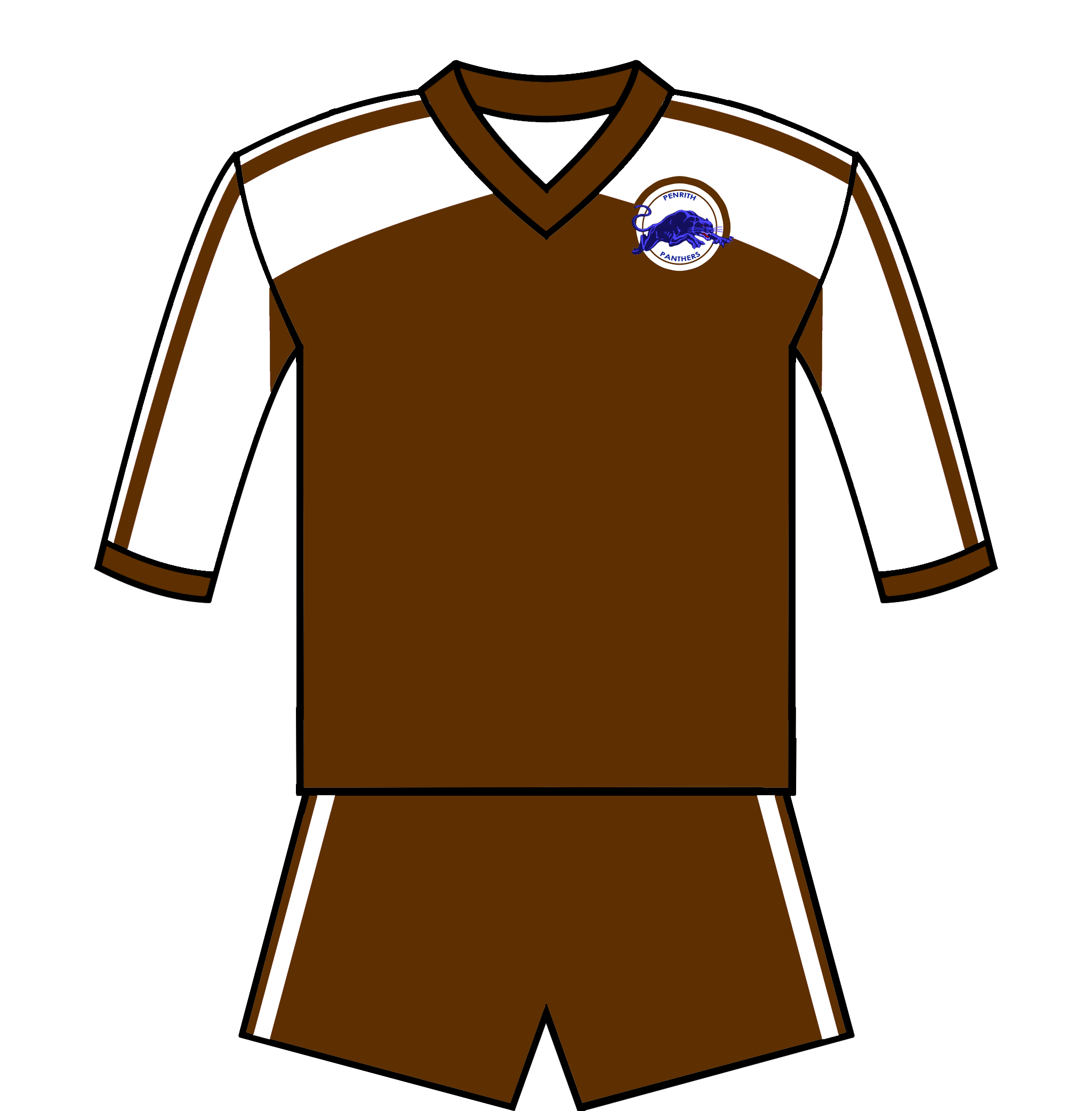
Penrith 14th season Ground: Penrith Park; Coach: Len Stacker; Captain: Tim Sheens

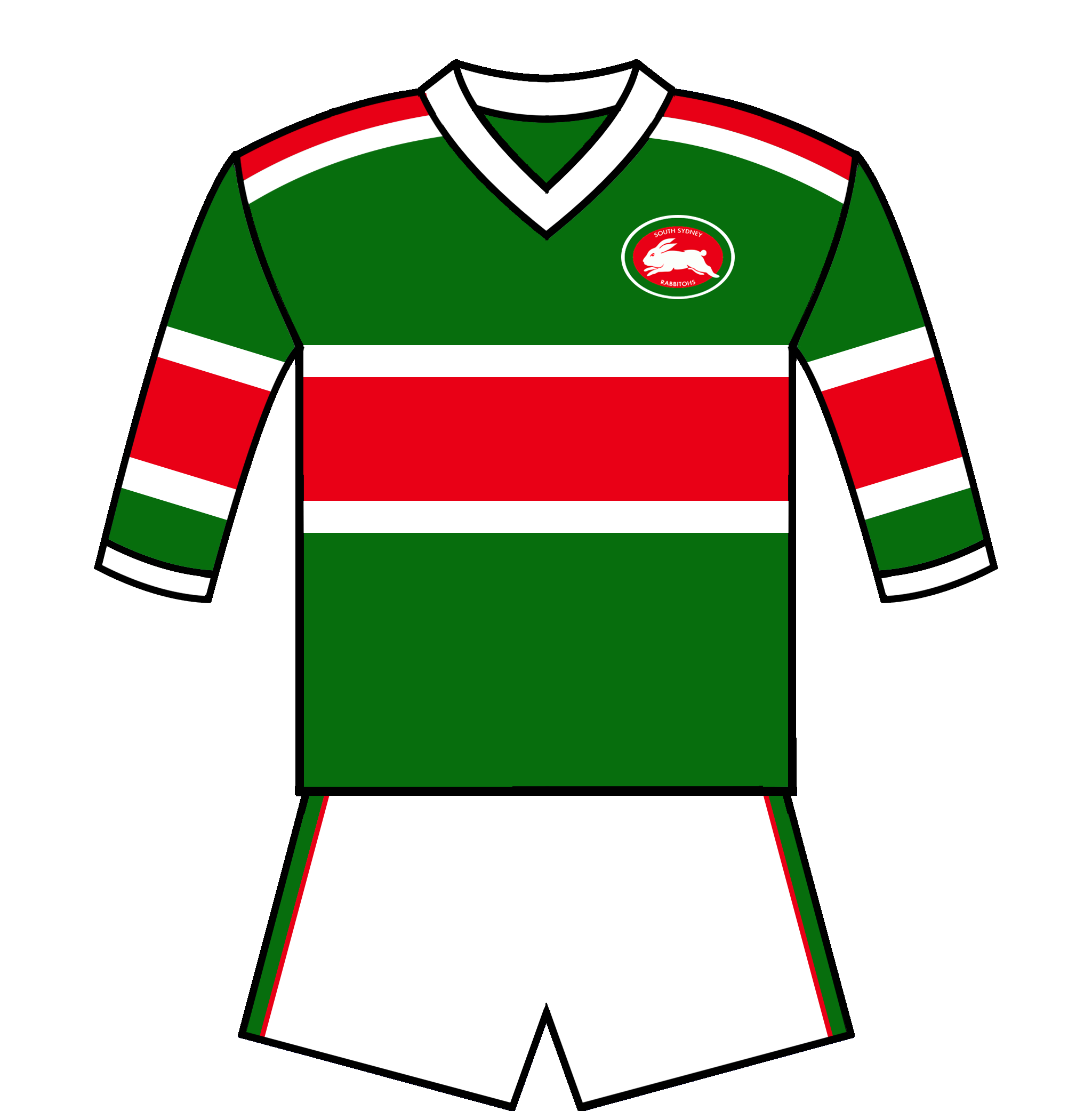
South Sydney 73rd season Ground: Redfern Oval; Coach: Bill Anderson; Captain: Robert Laurie→Nathan Gibbs

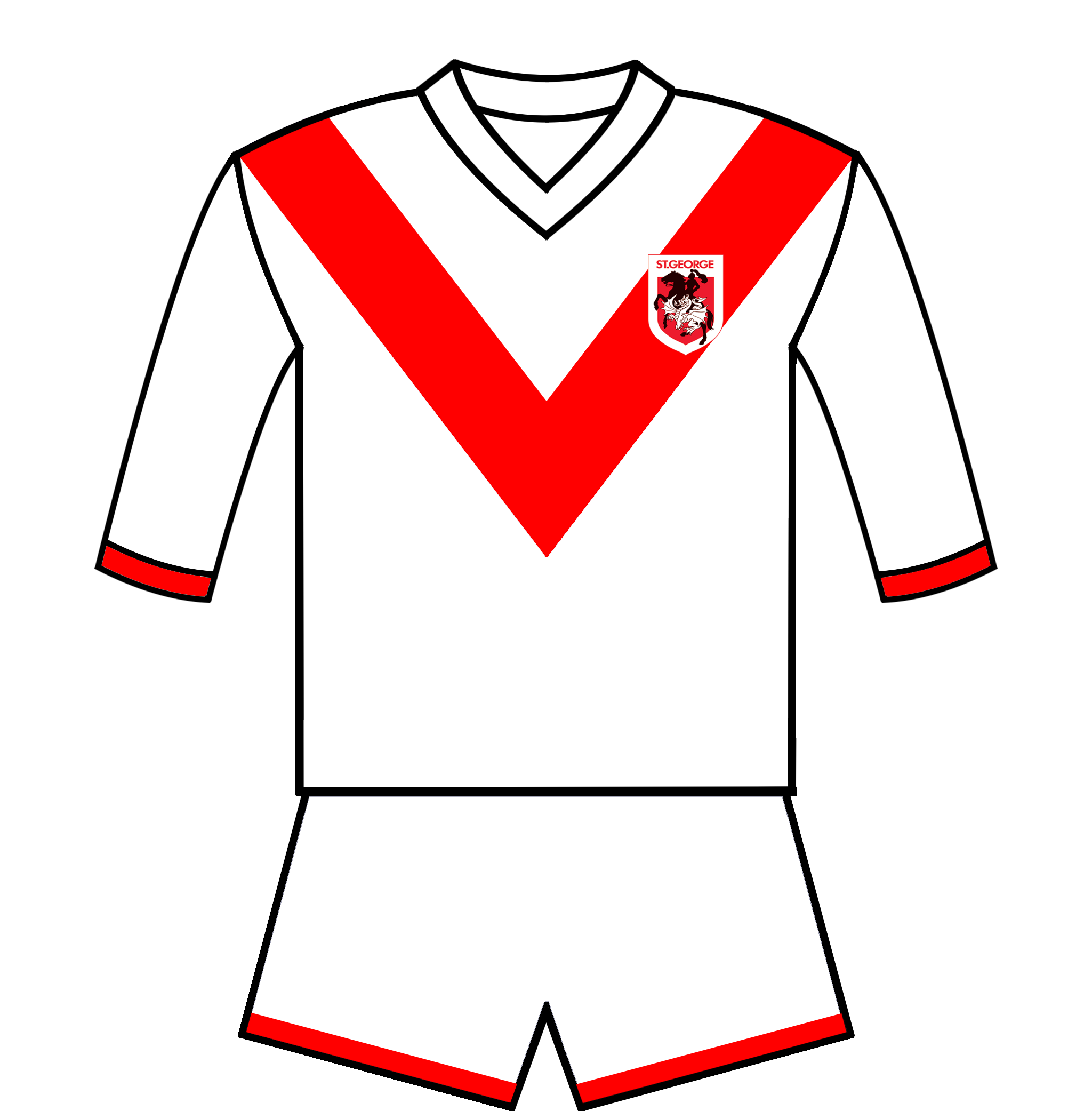
St. George 60th season Ground: Kogarah Oval; Coach: Harry Bath; Captain: Craig Young

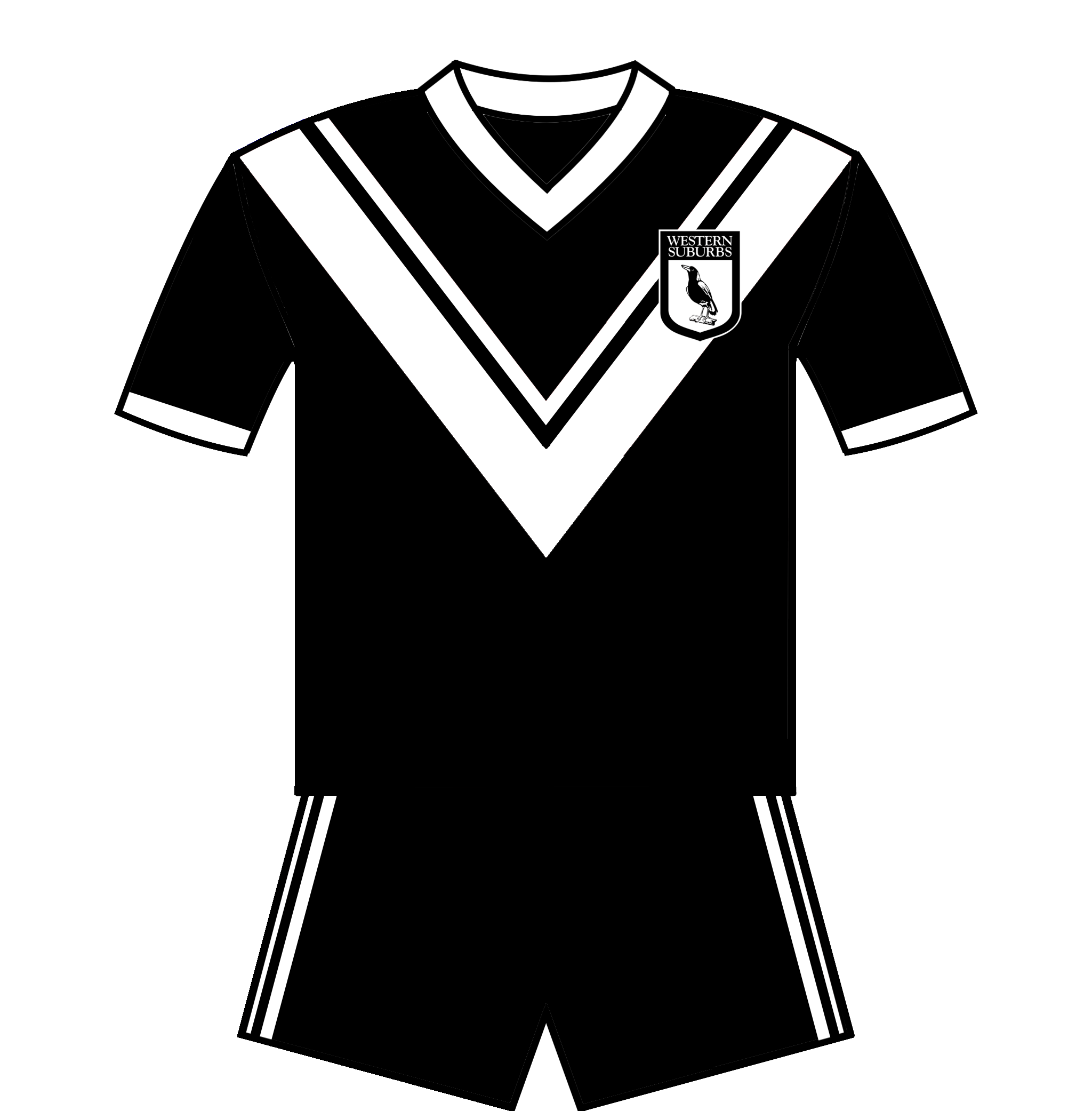
Western Suburbs 73rd season Ground: Lidcombe Oval; Coach: Roy Masters; Captain: Warren Boland

=== Ladder ===
	Team	Pld	W	D	L	PF	PA	PD	Pts
1	Eastern Suburbs	22	14	2	6	339	249	+90	30
2	Canterbury (P)	22	15	0	7	361	334	+27	30
3	Western Suburbs	22	14	0	8	429	308	+121	28
4	St. George	22	13	2	7	367	321	+46	28
5	South Sydney	22	12	1	9	392	318	+74	25
6	Parramatta	22	11	2	9	420	317	+103	24
7	Manly	22	11	2	9	335	354	-19	24
8	Newtown	22	11	1	10	348	357	-9	23
9	Cronulla	22	9	2	11	350	346	+4	20
10	Balmain	22	7	0	15	330	382	-52	14
11	North Sydney	22	6	1	15	282	405	-123	13
12	Penrith	22	2	1	19	294	556	-262	5

== Finals ==
Home	Score	Away	Match information
Home	Score	Away	Date and time	Venue	Referee	Crowd
Qualifying Finals
Canterbury	22–17	Western Suburbs	6 September 1980	Sydney Cricket Ground	Greg Hartley	21,948
St. George	16–5	South Sydney	7 September 1980	Sydney Cricket Ground	Jack Danzey	33,552
Semi-finals
Eastern Suburbs	7–13	Canterbury	13 September 1980	Sydney Cricket Ground	Greg Hartley	28,883
Western Suburbs	13–7	St. George	14 September 1980	Sydney Cricket Ground	Jack Danzey	28,451
Preliminary final
Eastern Suburbs	41–5	Western Suburbs	20 September 1980	Sydney Cricket Ground	Greg Hartley	28,596
Grand final
Canterbury	18–4	Eastern Suburbs	27 September 1980	Sydney Cricket Ground	Greg Hartley	52,881

=== Chart ===
Qualifying final
2	Canterbury	22
3	Western Suburbs	17
4	St. George	16
5	South Sydney	5

Major semi-final
1	Eastern Suburbs	7
Canterbury	13
Minor semi-final
Western Suburbs	13
St. George	7

Preliminary final
Eastern Suburbs	41
Western Suburbs	5

Grand final
Canterbury	18
Eastern Suburbs	4

== Grand Final ==
1980 NSWRFL Grand Final

Canterbury	Eastern Suburbs
18	4
	1	2	Total
CBY	7	11	18
EAS	4	0	4
- Date: 27 September 1980
- Stadium: Sydney Cricket Ground
- Location: Sydney
- Man of the Match: Steve Gearin (CBY)
- Referee: Greg Hartley
- Attendance: 52,881

Broadcast partners
- Broadcasters: ABC; Seven Network
- Commentators: Rex Mossop; Barry Ross; Trevor Gardner; John Sattler; Arthur Collinson

=== Teams ===
This was the last match for Eastern Suburbs forward John Lang who retired from rugby league after making his first grade rugby league debut with the Easts Tigers in 1969. The 1980 season was the only season he played in the NSWRFL premiership.

Team details
Canterbury-Bankstown Bulldogs		Position	Eastern Suburbs Roosters
Name	Number	Position	Number	Name
Greg Brentnall	1	FB	1	Marty Gurr
Chris Anderson	2	WG	2	David Michael
Chris Mortimer	3	CE	3	Kerry Boustead
Peter Mortimer	4	CE	4	Noel Cleal
Steve Gearin	5	WG	5	Steve McFarlane
Garry Hughes	6	FE	6	Ken Wright
Steve Mortimer	7	HB	7	Kevin Hastings
John Coveney	13	PR	13	John Harvey
George Peponis (c)	12	HK	12	John Lang
Geoff Robinson	11	PF	11	Royce Ayliffe (c)
Graeme Hughes	10	SR	10	John Tobin
Steve Folkes	9	SR	9	Des O'Reilly
Mark Hughes	8	LK	8	Gary Warnecke
Ted Glossop		Coach		Bob Fulton

=== Match details ===
Canterbury's loss of long serving fullback Stan Cutler with a broken leg suffered in the major semi-final, and the Roosters' form in the preliminary final resulted in Easts being warm favourites. But the Bulldogs, boasting two sets of brothers in the Hughes and Mortimers came ready to play expansive football. The Roosters began well and Noel Cleal was a constant threat but Canterbury's forwards led by Robinson and Coveney began to get on top. Canterbury's Chris Anderson scored the first try of the match after receiving a blatantly forward pass from Chris Mortimer in the lead up. The Roosters hit back and only desperate cover defence from Steve Mortimer on Easts' winger Steve McFarlane prevented a Roosters try. Ken Wright kicked two penalty goals for the tricolours, resulting in a 7–4 lead to the Bulldogs at half time.

After the break Steve Gearin edged the Bulldogs clear with three successive goals after aggressive play from the Roosters – led by John Tobin's focus on the Hughes brothers – was penalised by referee Greg Hartley. The final Canterbury try by Gearin has been ranked amongst the best of all time. Five minutes from full-time Greg Brentnall raced downfield and put up a high kick. Gearin followed through at speed and outjumped opposing winger David Michael, catching the ball on the full to score and secure a Bulldogs victory.

It was Canterbury's third premiership and had come after a wait of 38 years. It was the last Grand final to be played on a Saturday afternoon with the deciders since then being played on a Sunday.

=== Scoreboard ===
1980 NSWRFL Grand Final

Saturday, 27 September
15:00 AEST (UTC+10)

Canterbury-Bankstown Bulldogs	18 – 4	Eastern Suburbs Roosters
Tries: 2 Anderson; Gearin; Goals: 6 Gearin (6/6)	1st: 7–4; 2nd: 11–0; Report	Goals: 2 Wright (2/2)

Sydney Cricket Ground, Sydney
Attendance: 52,881
Referee: Greg Hartley
Player of the Match: Steve Gearin (Canterbury)

== Player statistics ==
The following statistics are as of the conclusion of Round 22.

Top 5 point scorers

Points	Player	Tries	Goals	Field Goals
197	Ken Wilson	5	90	2
188	Steve Gearin	12	76	0
176	Mick Cronin	6	79	0
166	Graham Eadie	2	80	0
160	Ron Giteau	8	68	0

Top 5 try scorers

Tries	Player
16	Wayne Wigham
14	John Ribot
12	Steve Gearin
12	Neville Glover
12	Marvin Hicks

Top 5 goal scorers

Goals	Player
90	Ken Wilson
80	Graham Eadie
79	Mick Cronin
78	Wayne Miranda
76	Steve Gearin

== See also ==
- 1980 State of Origin
