= 1979 NSWRFL season =

Rugby league competition

1979 New South Wales Rugby Football League
- Teams: 12
- Premiers: St. George (15th title)
- Minor premiers: St. George (14th title)
- Matches played: 138
- Points scored: 4466
- Total attendance: 1,500,369
- Top points scorer: Mick Cronin (253)
- Wooden spoon: North Sydney (9th spoon)
- Rothmans Medal: Ray Price
- Top try-scorer(s): Mitch Brennan (16); Tom Mooney (16)

The 1979 NSWRFL season was the 72nd season of Sydney's professional rugby league football competition, Australia's first. Twelve New South Wales Rugby Football League clubs competed for the J.J. Giltinan Shield and WD & HO Wills Cup during the season, which culminated in a grand final between the St. George and Canterbury-Bankstown clubs. NSWRFL teams also competed in the 1979 Amco Cup.

== Season summary ==
Twenty-two regular season rounds were played from March till August, resulting in a top five of St. George, Parramatta, Cronulla-Sutherland, Western Suburbs and Canterbury-Bankstown who battled it out in the finals.

1979 Great Britain Lions tour's Australian leg saw several matches against teams across New South Wales, several involving NSWRFL players, such as the 3 Test matches against Australia and a match against New South Wales.

Parramatta's Ray Price was the 1979 season's Rothmans Medallist, and also won Rugby League Week’s player of the year award.

The 1979 season also saw the retirement from the League of future Australian Rugby League Hall of Fame inductee, Bob Fulton.

=== Teams ===
Twelve clubs, including six of 1908's foundation teams and another six from around Sydney competed for the NSWRFL premiership.

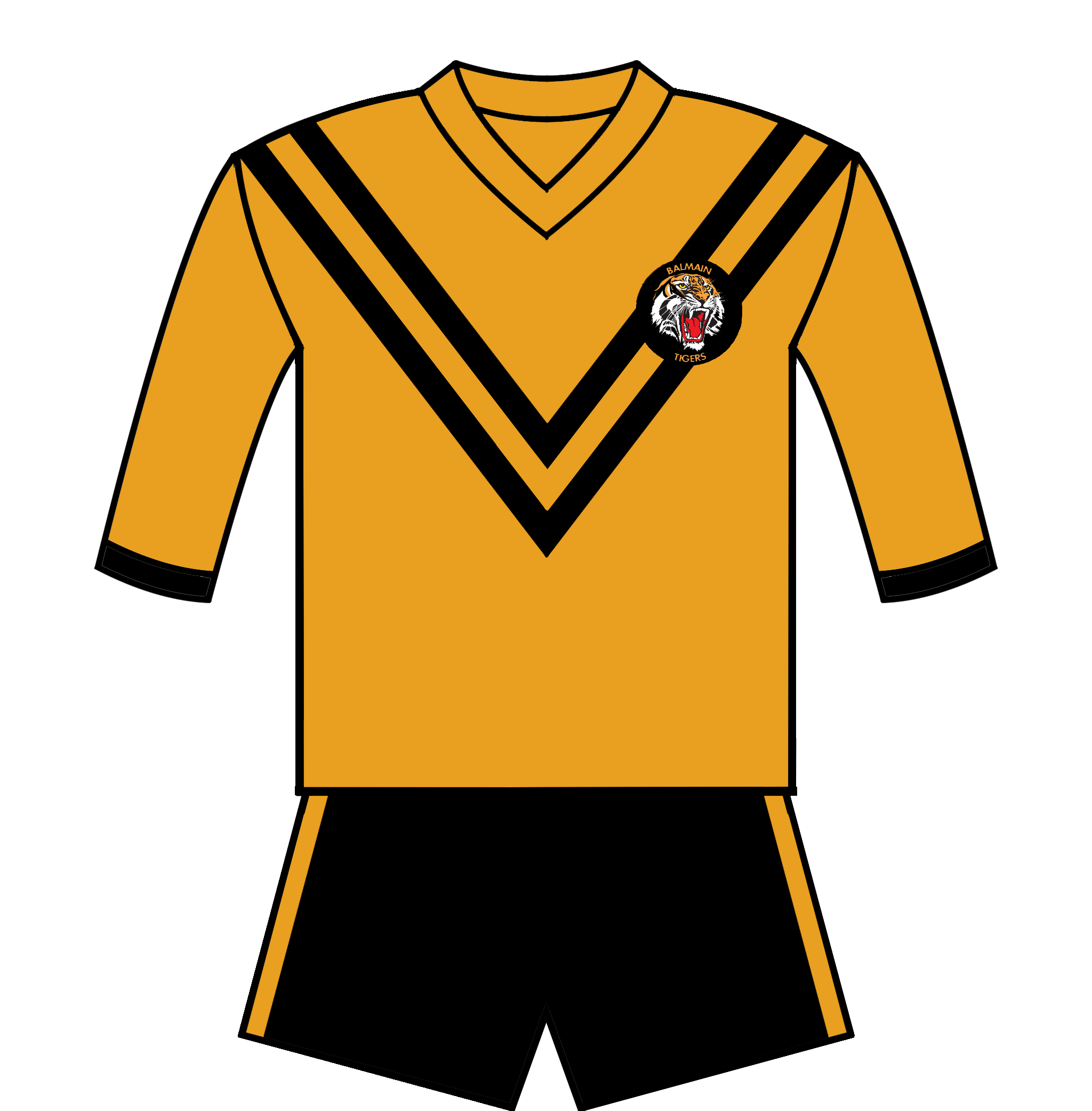
Balmain 72nd season Ground: Leichhardt Oval; Coach: Ron Willey; Captain: Allan McMahon

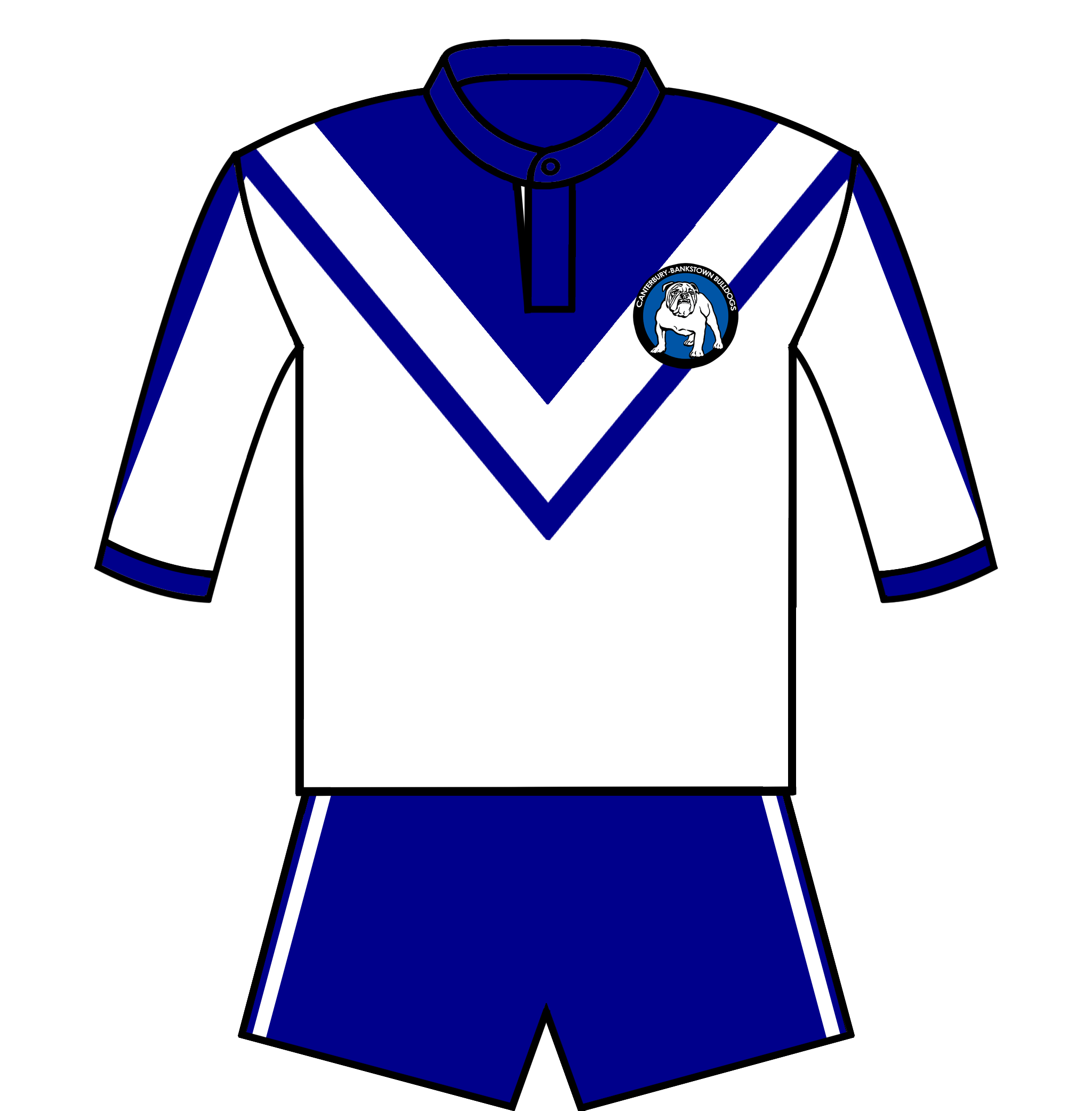
Canterbury-Bankstown 45th season Ground: Belmore Oval; Coach: Ted Glossop; Captain: George Peponis

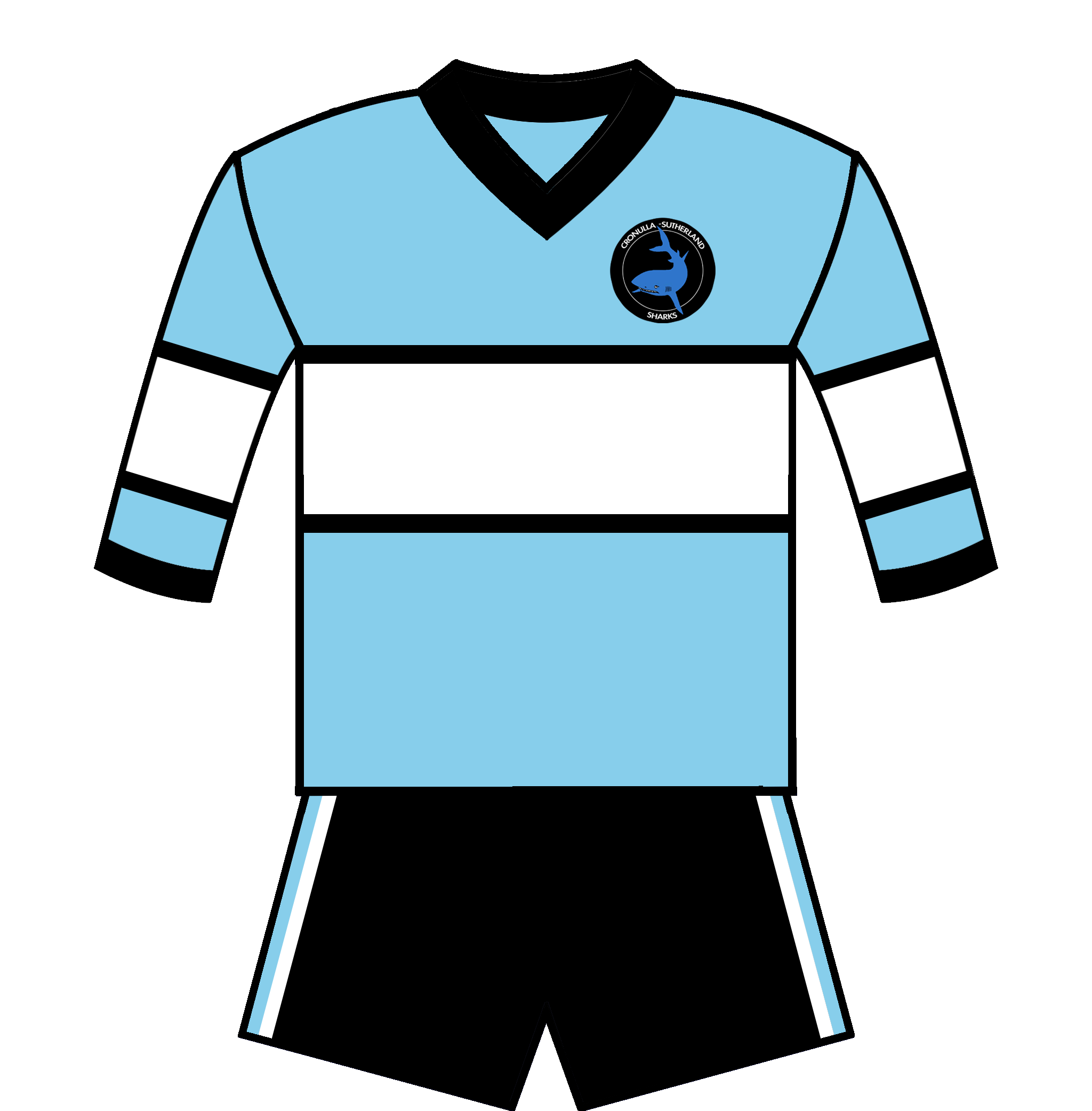
Cronulla-Sutherland 13th season Ground: Endeavour Field; Coach: Norm Provan; Captain: Greg Pierce

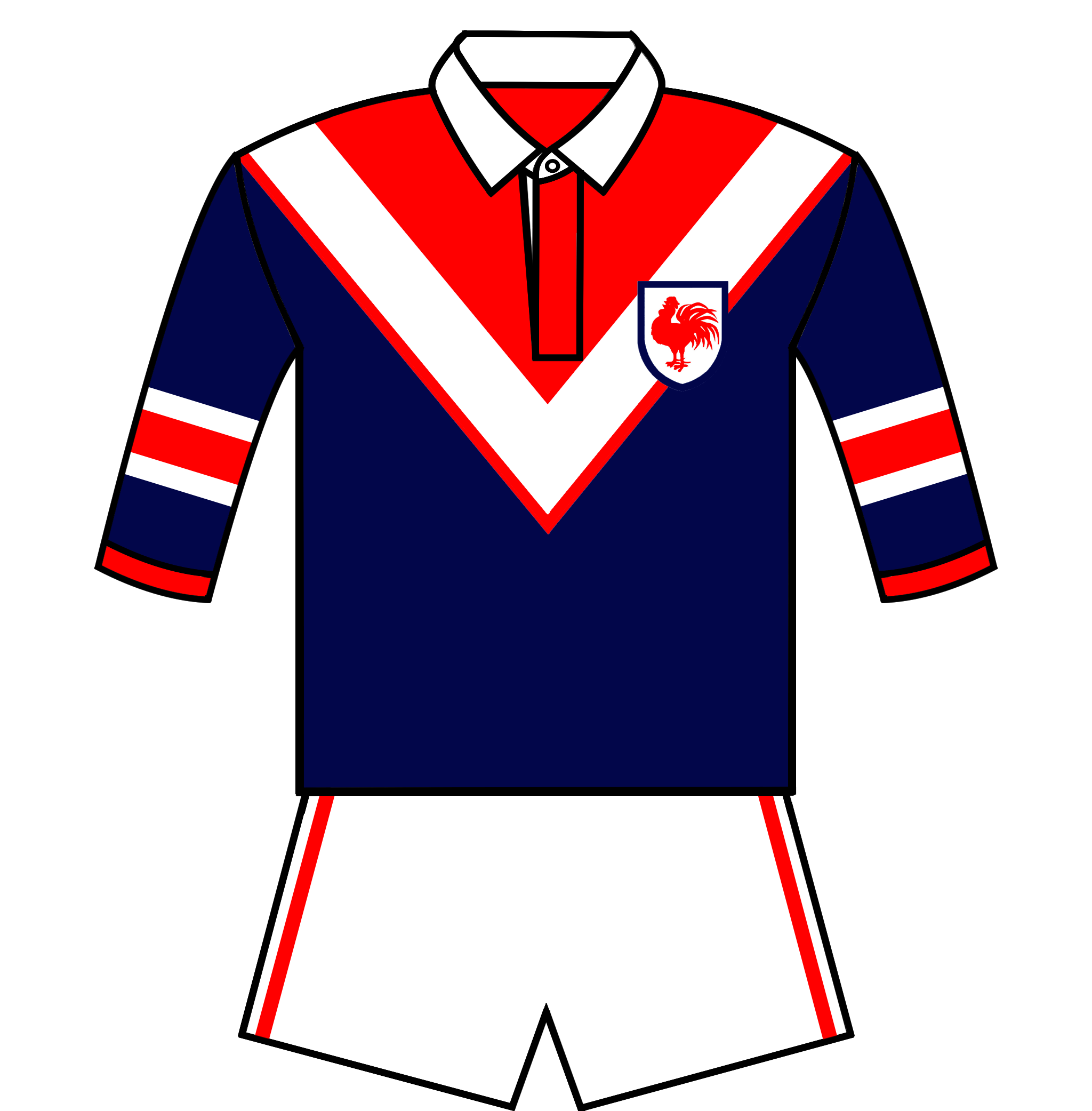
Eastern Suburbs 72nd season Ground: Sydney Sports Ground; Captain/Coach: Bob Fulton

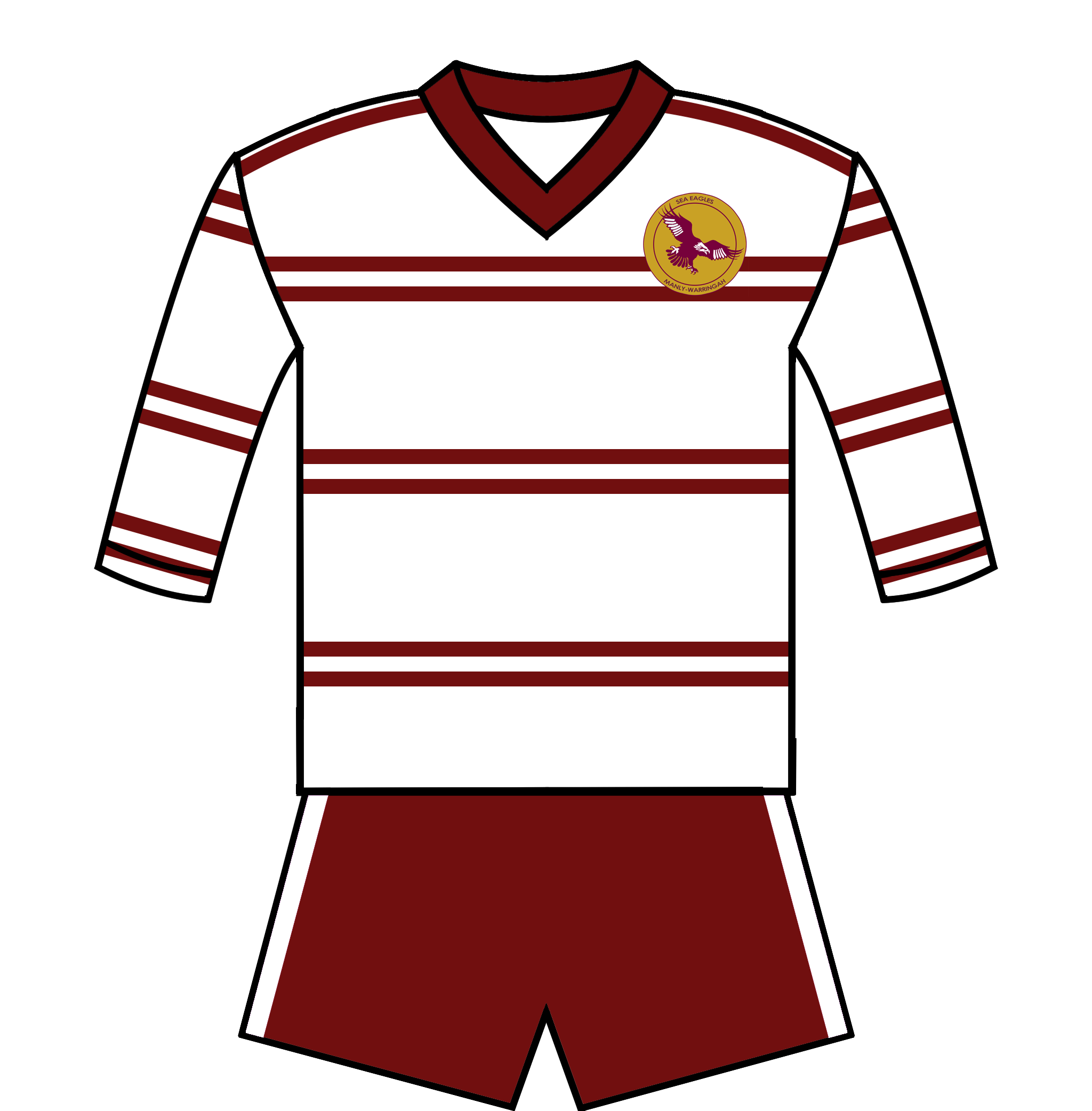
Manly-Warringah 33rd season Ground: Brookvale Oval; Coach: Frank Stanton; Captain: Max Krilich

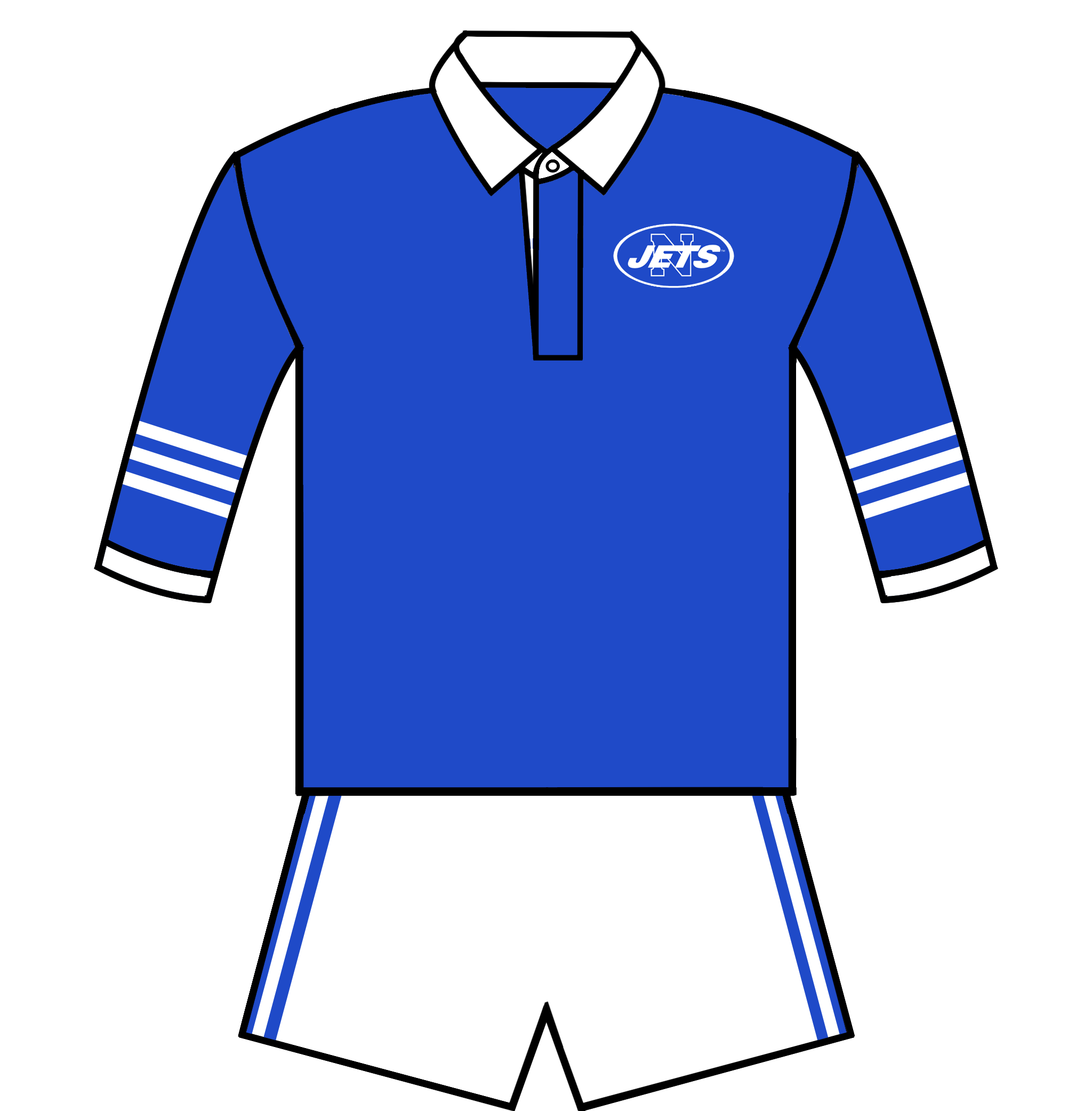
Newtown 72nd season Ground: Henson Park; Coach: Warren Ryan; Captain: Trevor Ryan→ Ken Wilson

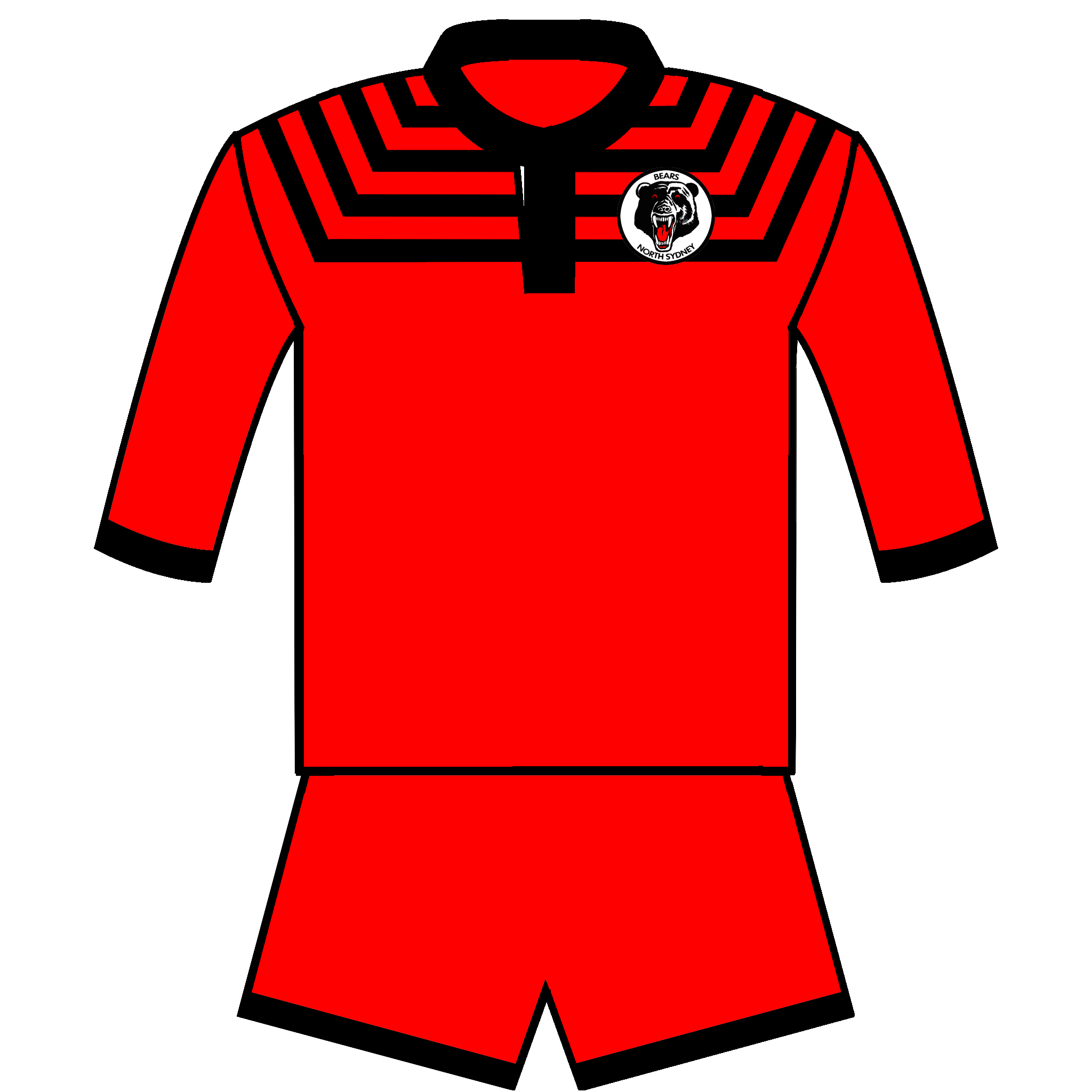
North Sydney 72nd season Ground: North Sydney Oval; Coach: Tommy Bishop; Captain: Keith Harris

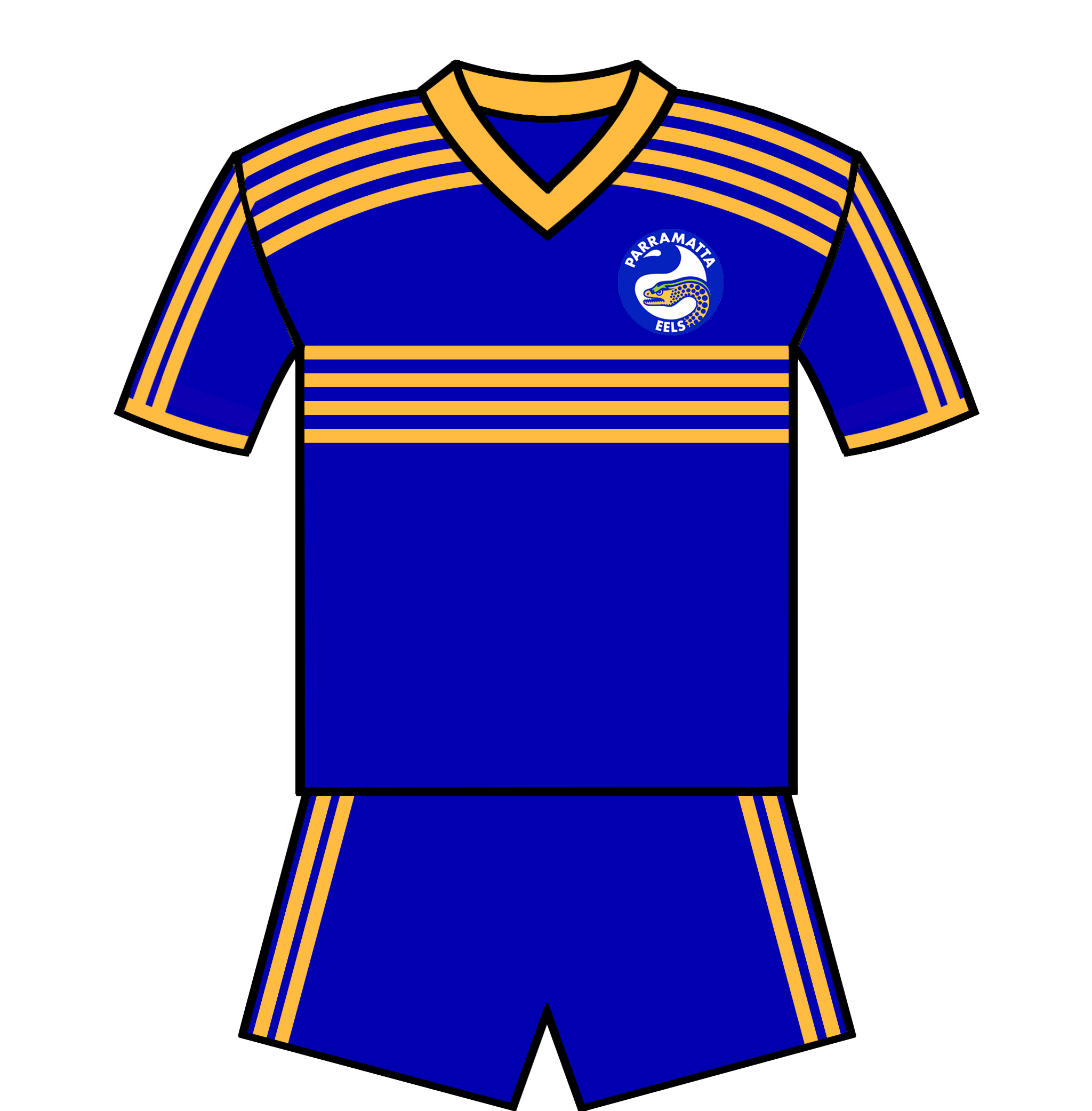
Parramatta 33rd season Ground: Cumberland Oval; Coach: Terry Fearnley; Captain: Ray Price

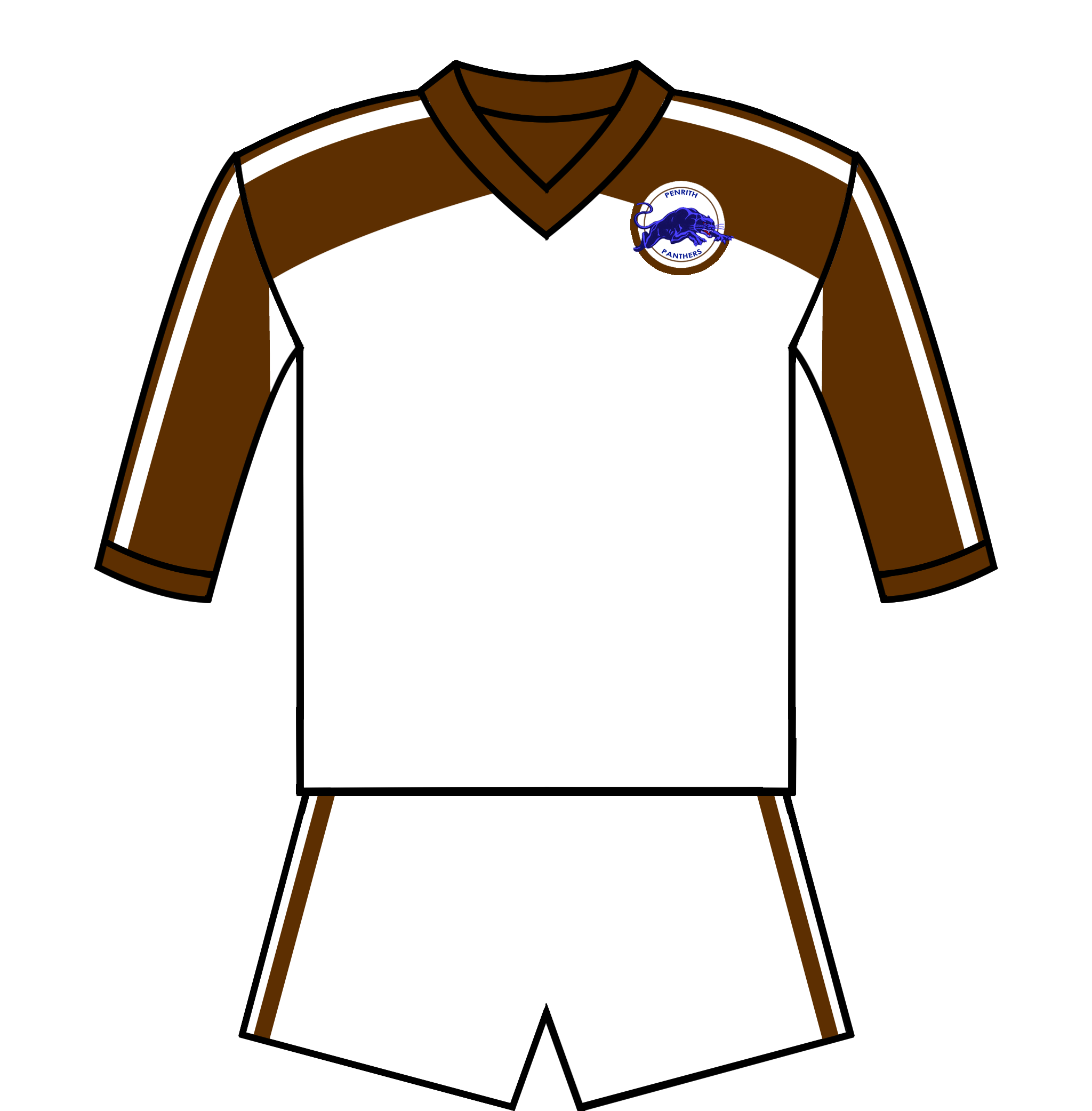
Penrith 13th season Ground: Penrith Park; Coach: Len Stacker; Captain: Gary Pethybridge

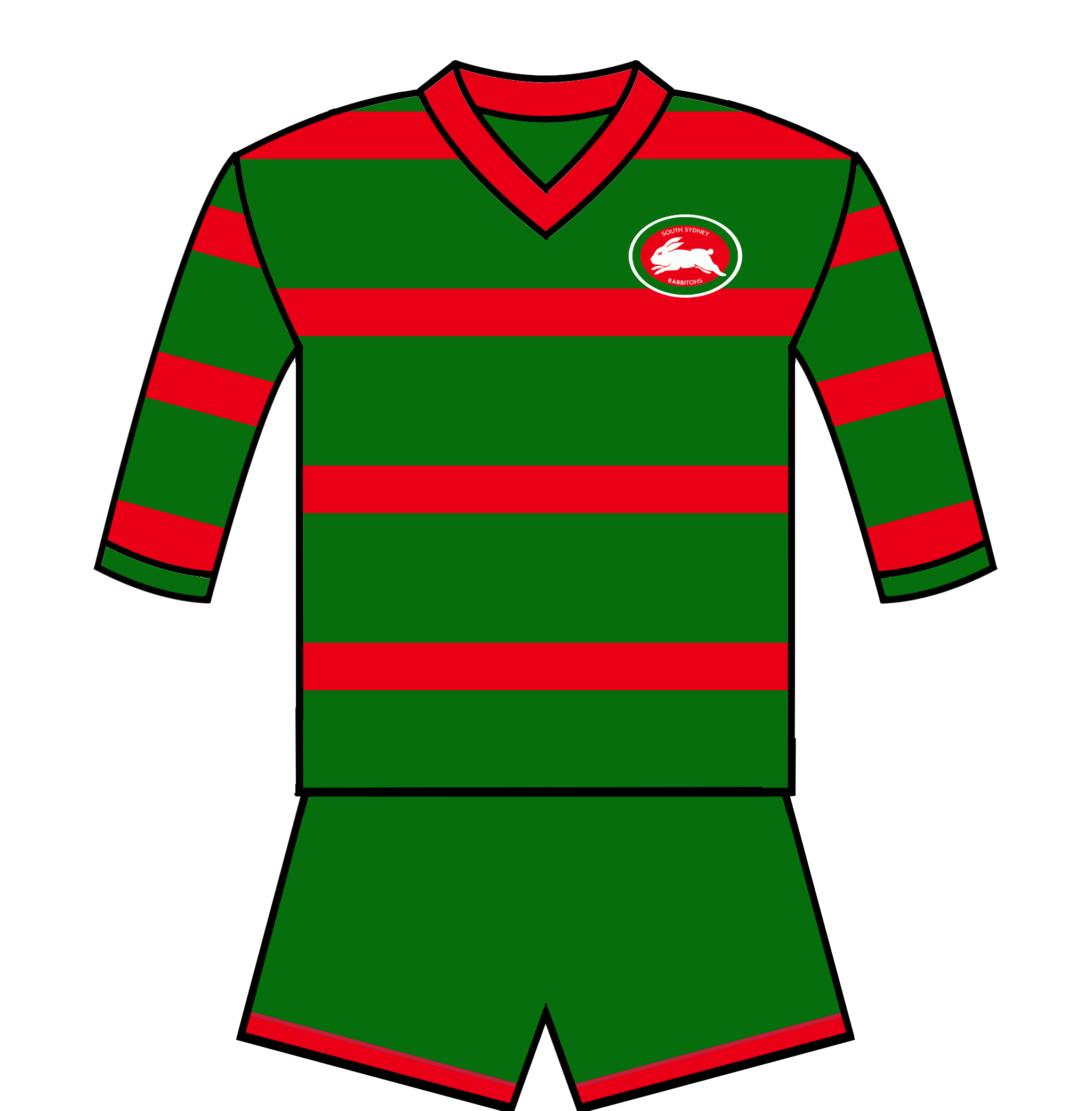
South Sydney 72nd season Ground: Redfern Oval; Coach: Jack Gibson; Captain: Bob McMillan, Darrell Bampton, Terry Fahey

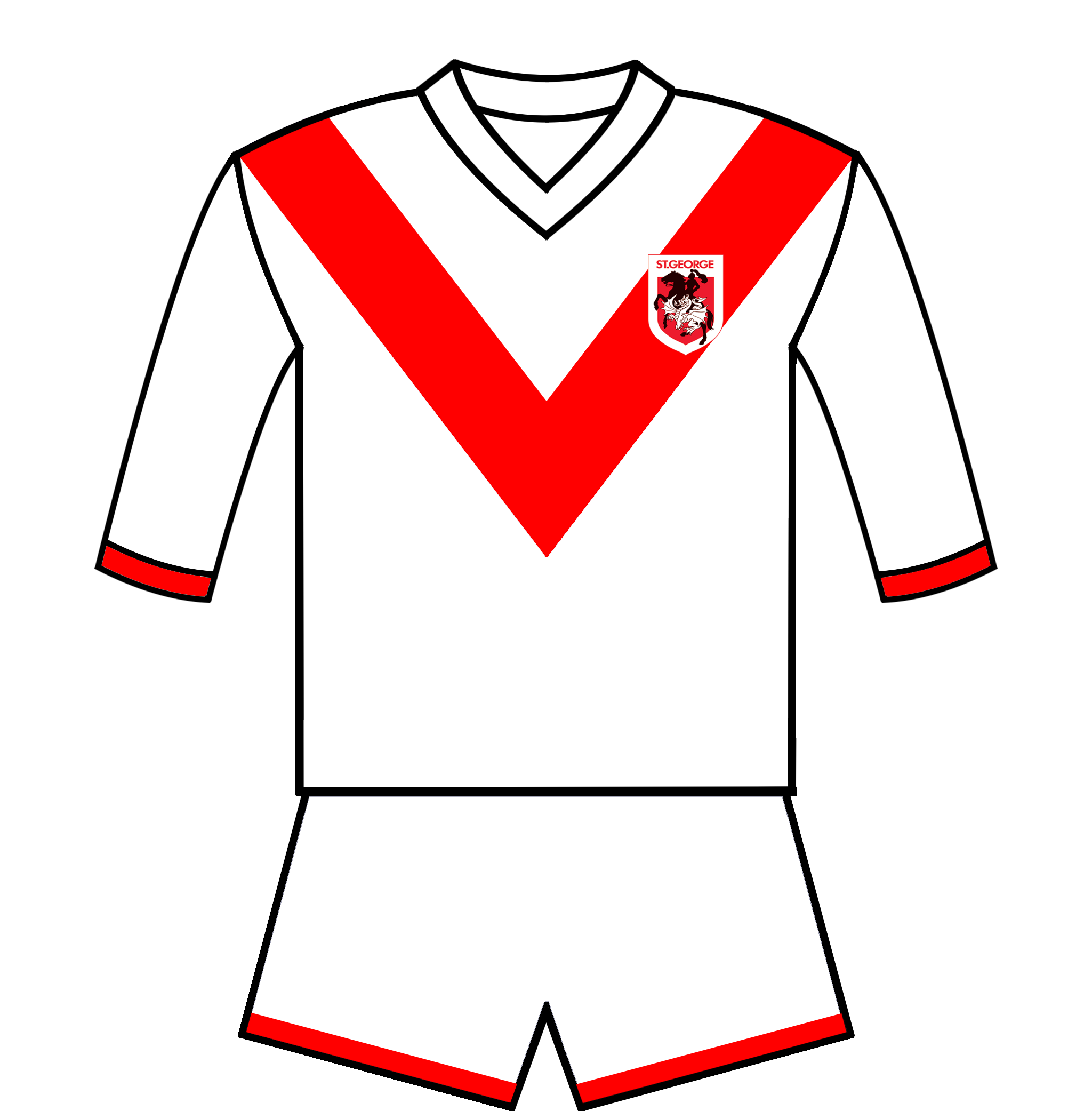
St. George Dragons 59th season Ground: Kogarah Oval; Coach: Harry Bath; Captain: Steve Edge→Craig Young

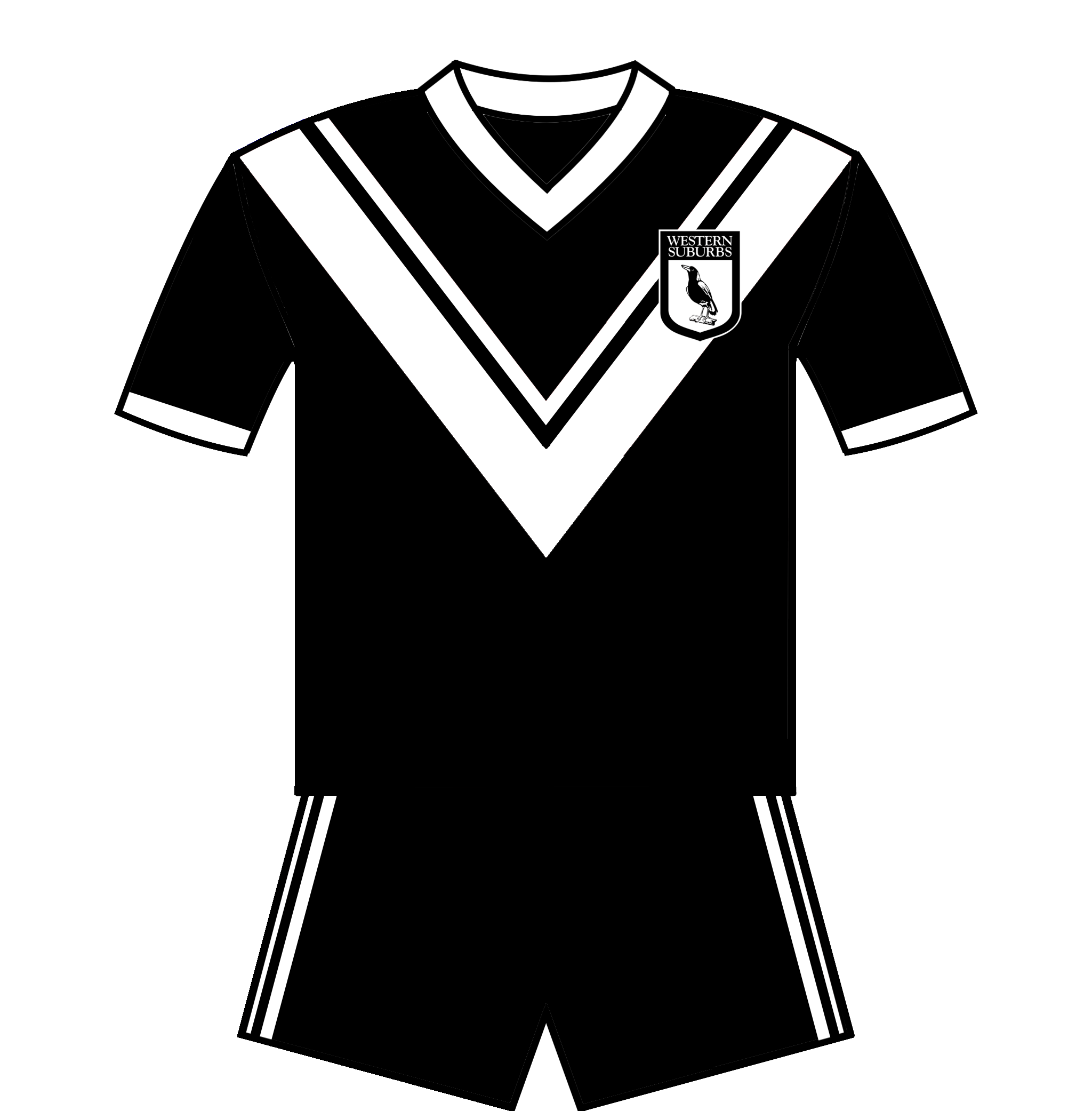
Western Suburbs 72nd season Ground: Lidcombe Oval; Coach: Roy Masters; Captain: Tom Raudonikis

== Regular season ==
Team	1	2	3	4	5	6	7	8	9	10	11	12	13	14	15	16	17	18	19	20	21	22	23	F1	F2	F3	GF
Balmain Tigers	**EAS** **+22**	WES −10	CRO +9	**CBY** **−13**	**STG** **+7**	NEW +4	**MAN** **+5**	PEN; 0	**NOR** **+15**	PAR −35	**SOU** **+10**	EAS +28	**WES** **−2**	X	CBY −2	STG +13	**NEW** **+4**	MAN −16	**PEN** **+7**	NOR +4	**PAR** **−1**	**CRO** **−3**	SOU −1				
Canterbury-Bankstown Bulldogs	**PEN** **+11**	**NOR** **+8**	PAR −1	BAL +13	**EAS** **+3**	WES +6	**CRO** **−2**	SOU +9	**STG** **−13**	NEW +28	**MAN** **−9**	PEN −5	NOR +9	**PAR** **+1**	**BAL** **+2**	EAS −8	**WES** **+1**	CRO −2	**SOU** **+6**	STG −8	**NEW** **+32**	X	MAN −12	WES +14	CRO +15	PAR +6	STG −4
Cronulla-Sutherland Sharks	NOR +27	**PAR** **+25**	**BAL** **−9**	EAS −11	**WES** **+7**	**SOU** **+9**	CBY +2	STG +7	**NEW** **+20**	MAN −5	PEN −6	**NOR** **+14**	PAR −15	X	**EAS** **+22**	WES +10	SOU −15	**CBY** **+2**	**STG** **+5**	NEW −14	**MAN** **+19**	BAL +3	**PEN**; **0**	PAR −20	**CBY** **−15**		
Eastern Suburbs Roosters	BAL −22	**SOU** **−4**	WES −9	**CRO** **+11**	CBY −3	**STG** **−13**	NEW +5	**MAN**; **0**	**PEN** **+32**	NOR −7	PAR −5	**BAL** **−28**	SOU +5	**WES** **+5**	CRO −22	**CBY** **+8**	STG −25	**NEW** **+7**	MAN −22	PEN +11	**NOR** **+14**	X	**PAR** **−9**				
Manly Warringah Sea Eagles	STG −25	NEW +4	**SOU** **+11**	PEN +15	**NOR** **−3**	**PAR** **−15**	BAL −5	EAS; 0	**WES** **−7**	**CRO** **+5**	CBY +9	**STG** **−7**	**NEW** **+6**	X	**PEN** **+5**	NOR +7	PAR −17	**BAL** **+16**	**EAS** **+22**	WES −8	CRO −19	SOU −18	**CBY** **+12**				
Newtown Jets	SOU +1	**MAN** **−4**	**PEN** **−9**	NOR +1	PAR −18	**BAL** **−4**	**EAS** **−5**	**WES** **−3**	CRO −20	**CBY** **−28**	STG −5	**SOU** **+24**	MAN −6	PEN +26	**NOR** **+19**	**PAR** **−13**	BAL −4	EAS −7	WES −17	**CRO** **+14**	CBY −32	X	**STG** **−12**				
North Sydney Bears	**CRO** **−27**	CBY −8	STG −17	**NEW** **−1**	MAN +3	PEN −8	**SOU** **−7**	**PAR** **−31**	BAL −15	**EAS** **+7**	WES −11	CRO −14	**CBY** **−9**	X	NEW −19	**MAN** **−7**	**PEN** **−4**	SOU −6	PAR −38	**BAL** **−4**	EAS −14	**STG** **−3**	**WES** **−12**				
Parramatta Eels	**WES** **−11**	CRO −25	**CBY** **+1**	STG −6	**NEW** **+18**	MAN +15	**PEN** **+9**	NOR +31	**SOU** **+11**	**BAL** **+35**	**EAS** **+5**	WES −18	**CRO** **+15**	CBY −1	**STG** **−1**	NEW +13	**MAN** **+17**	PEN +3	**NOR** **+38**	SOU +14	BAL +1	X	EAS +9	**CRO** **+20**	STG −4	**CBY** **−6**	
Penrith Panthers	CBY −11	**STG** **+3**	NEW +9	**MAN** **−15**	SOU −30	**NOR** **+8**	PAR −9	**BAL**; **0**	EAS −32	WES −1	**CRO** **+6**	**CBY** **+5**	STG −22	**NEW** **−26**	MAN −5	**SOU** **−17**	NOR +4	**PAR** **−3**	BAL −7	**EAS** **−11**	**WES** **−8**	X	CRO; 0				
South Sydney Rabbitohs	**NEW** **−1**	EAS +4	MAN −11	**WES** **−14**	**PEN** **+30**	CRO −9	NOR +7	**CBY** **−9**	PAR −11	**STG** **−21**	BAL −10	NEW −24	**EAS** **−5**	X	WES +2	PEN +17	**CRO** **+15**	**NOR** **+6**	CBY −6	**PAR** **−14**	STG −8	**MAN** **+18**	**BAL** **+1**				
St. George Dragons	**MAN** **+25**	PEN −3	**NOR** **+17**	**PAR** **+6**	BAL −7	EAS +13	**WES** **+15**	**CRO** **−7**	CBY +13	SOU +21	**NEW** **+5**	MAN +7	**PEN** **+22**	X	PAR +1	**BAL** **−13**	**EAS** **+25**	WES +1	CRO −5	**CBY** **+8**	**SOU** **+8**	NOR +3	NEW +12	X	**PAR** **+4**	X	**CBY** **+4**
Western Suburbs Magpies	PAR +11	**BAL** **+10**	**EAS** **+9**	SOU +14	CRO −7	**CBY** **−6**	STG −15	NEW +3	MAN +7	**PEN** **+1**	**NOR** **+11**	**PAR** **+18**	BAL +2	EAS −5	**SOU** **−2**	**CRO** **−10**	CBY −1	**STG** **−1**	**NEW** **+17**	**MAN** **+8**	PEN +8	X	NOR +12	**CBY** **−14**			
Team	1	2	3	4	5	6	7	8	9	10	11	12	13	14	15	16	17	18	19	20	21	22	23	F1	F2	F3	GF

Bold – Home game
X – Bye
Opponent for round listed above margin

=== Ladder ===
	Team	Pld	W	D	L	PF	PA	PD	Pts
1	St. George	22	17	0	5	476	309	+167	34
2	Parramatta	22	16	0	6	490	317	+173	32
3	Cronulla	22	14	1	7	367	270	+97	29
4	Western Suburbs	22	14	0	8	396	312	+84	28
5	Canterbury	22	13	0	9	379	310	+69	26
6	Balmain	22	12	1	9	358	313	+45	25
7	Manly	22	11	1	10	341	353	-12	23
8	Eastern Suburbs	22	9	1	12	250	321	-71	19
9	South Sydney	22	9	0	13	286	329	-43	18
10	Penrith	22	6	2	14	311	473	-162	14
11	Newtown	22	6	0	16	321	423	-102	12
12	North Sydney	22	2	0	20	302	547	-245	4

=== Ladder progression ===
- Numbers highlighted in green indicate that the team finished the round inside the top 5.
- Numbers highlighted in blue indicates the team finished first on the ladder in that round.
- Numbers highlighted in red indicates the team finished last place on the ladder in that round.
- Underlined numbers indicate that the team had a bye during that round.

	Team	1	2	3	4	5	6	7	8	9	10	11	12	13	14	15	16	17	18	19	20	21	22	23
1	St. George Dragons	2	2	4	6	6	8	10	10	12	14	16	18	20	20	22	22	24	26	26	28	30	32	34
2	Parramatta Eels	0	0	2	2	4	6	8	10	12	14	16	16	18	18	18	20	22	24	26	28	30	30	32
3	Cronulla-Sutherland Sharks	2	4	4	4	6	8	10	12	14	14	14	16	16	16	18	20	20	22	24	24	26	28	29
4	Western Suburbs Magpies	2	4	6	8	8	8	8	10	12	14	16	18	20	20	20	20	20	20	22	24	26	26	28
5	Canterbury-Bankstown Bulldogs	2	4	4	6	8	10	10	12	12	14	14	14	16	18	20	20	22	22	24	24	26	26	26
6	Balmain Tigers	2	2	4	4	6	8	10	11	13	13	15	17	17	17	17	19	21	21	23	25	25	25	25
7	Manly Warringah Sea Eagles	0	2	4	6	6	6	6	7	7	9	11	11	13	13	15	17	17	19	21	21	21	21	23
8	Eastern Suburbs Roosters	0	0	0	2	2	2	4	5	7	7	7	7	9	11	11	13	13	15	15	17	19	19	19
9	South Sydney Rabbitohs	0	2	2	2	4	4	6	6	6	6	6	6	6	6	8	10	12	14	14	14	14	16	18
10	Penrith Panthers	0	2	4	4	4	6	6	7	7	7	9	11	11	11	11	11	13	13	13	13	13	13	14
11	Newtown Jets	2	2	2	4	4	4	4	4	4	4	4	6	6	8	10	10	10	10	10	12	12	12	12
12	North Sydney Bears	0	0	0	0	2	2	2	2	2	4	4	4	4	4	4	4	4	4	4	4	4	4	4

== Finals ==
Home	Score	Away	Match Information
Home	Score	Away	Date and Time	Venue	Referee	Crowd
Minor semi-finals
Parramatta	24–4	Cronulla-Sutherland	1 September 1979	Sydney Cricket Ground	Gary Cook	28,335
Western Suburbs	6–20	Canterbury-Bankstown	2 September 1979	Sydney Cricket Ground	Greg Hartley	22,104
Major semi-finals
St. George	15–11	Parramatta	8 September 1979	Sydney Cricket Ground	Gary Cook	38,531
Cronulla-Sutherland	15–30	Canterbury-Bankstown	9 September 1979	Sydney Cricket Ground	Greg Hartley	24,132
Preliminary final
Parramatta	14–20	Canterbury-Bankstown	15 September 1979	Sydney Cricket Ground	Greg Hartley	33,291
Grand final
St. George	17–13	Canterbury-Bankstown	22 September 1979	Sydney Cricket Ground	Greg Hartley	50,911

=== Chart ===
Qualifying final
2	Parramatta	24
3	Cronulla-Sutherland	4
4	Western Suburbs	6
5	Canterbury	20

Major semi-final
1	St. George	15
Parramatta	11
Minor semi-final
Cronulla-Sutherland	15
Canterbury	30

Preliminary final
Parramatta	14
Canterbury	20

Grand final
St. George	17
Canterbury	13

=== Grand final ===
St. George	Position	Canterbury-Bankstown
1. Brian Johnson	FB	1. Stan Cutler
2. Mitch Brennan	WG	2. Chris Anderson
3. Graeme Quinn	CE	3. Chris Mortimer
4. Robert Finch	CE	4. Peter Mortimer
5. Michael Sorridimi	WG	5. Steve Gearin
6. Tony Trudgett	FE	6. Garry Hughes
7. Steve Morris	HB	7 Steve Mortimer
13. Bruce Starkey	PR	13. Greg Cook
12. Steve Edge	HK	12. George Peponis (c)
11. Craig Young (c)	PR	11. Peter Smith
10. George Grant	SR	10. Graeme Hughes
9. Graeme Wynn	SR	9. Peter Cassilles
8. Rod Reddy	LK	8. Steve Folkes
16. Stephen Butler	Res.	14. Mark Hughes
18. Robert Stone	Res.	
Harry Bath	Coach	Ted Glossop

St. George finished 22 rounds as minor premiers with 17 wins and were straight into the grand final after defeating Parramatta in the major semi. Their Grand final opponents Canterbury, qualified after defeating Wests, Cronulla and Parramatta.

==== Television Coverage Dispute ====
Under agreements in place at the time, the broadcast rights to the season saw one to two games on ABC TV on Saturday and/or Sunday afternoons, and a Sunday Night primetime replay and highlights of other matches on ATN-7 (part of the Seven's Big League programming). Under this agreement, the networks had rights to each broadcast and/or simulcast all six of the finals series games, under which they could either accept or decline the matches.

The scene was set by an industrial relations dispute between camera and production crews and commercial broadcasting networks towards the end of 1979. This forced ATN-7 and the ABC into a shared feed arrangement using ABC production crew, but separate network commentary teams calling the game.

ATN-7, wore the financial costs as the designated broadcaster of the preliminary final, and provided the ABC with a clean feed of the match as agreed. However, the ABC refused to offer a clean feed to ATN-7 for the grand final, which caused massive controversy. ATN-7 then exercised their right as the primary broadcaster of the competition to broadcast the match between St George and Canterbury exclusively, deciding to source their own freelance crew and cover the match. The ABC then sued ATN-7, and the Australian Broadcasting Tribunal became involved, but ultimately the match remained exclusive to Seven's Big League.

==== Match ====
The pre-game talk had been about the match-up of opposing half-backs Steve Morris and Steve Mortimer and the game didn't disappoint, beginning with a 40-metre flying break on a last tackle by Morris from deep in Dragons territory before he was cut down in a classic covering tackle by Mortimer.

The first half belonged to St. George with new fullback Brian Johnson scoring an easy opening try after taking a pass 10 metres out from the Canterbury line. Soon after, Rod Reddy, who was subduing his opponents with his experience and ruthlessness, put Morris into a gap. “Slippery” kicked ahead and the race was on. Mortimer had a head start and got there first but Morris tackled him into touch.

Soon afterwards Canterbury put a bomb up and toward the St. George in-goal. Brian Johnson was on hand to field the ball and returned it with a 60-metre run ended by a copybook tackle from his opposing fullback Stan Cutler. However the defence was opening up and it wasn't long before the Dragons scored their second try, with winger Mitch Brennan venturing infield and finding a gap courtesy of centre Robert Finch who slipped a short ball to Brennan 30 metres out. The strapping winger made a powerful run to score.

By now, Saints were carving Canterbury up with Morris, on his 20-metre line, putting Graeme Wynn into a gap. The lanky back rower ran 40 metres, leaving defenders in his wake. Next it was “Rocket” Reddy's turn when Morris, Wynn and Reddy combined down the right flank and exposed the Bulldogs defence. 'Rocket' handled twice in scoring a try under the posts. At half time the score was St George 17 – Canterbury 2.

Canterbury fought back gamely after the break. Steve Gearin and then Peter Mortimer crossed, with two further tries being disallowed. The St. George defence rallied and held from that point until Stan Cutler scored a third try out wide late in the match. St. George's goal-kicking second rower George Grant was the difference on the day, kicking four to ensure a 17–13 victory. Grant had kicked brilliantly all season, scoring 211 points in 1979.

The Dave Brown Medal for the best player on field, went to Steve Morris.

St. George 17 (Tries: Johnson, Brennan, Reddy. Goals: Grant 4.)

Canterbury-Bankstown 13 (Tries: Gearin, Mortimer, Cutler. Goals: Gearin 2.)

== Player statistics ==
The following statistics are as of the conclusion of Round 22.

Top 5 point scorers

Points	Player	Tries	Goals	Field Goals
229	Mick Cronin	13	95	0
206	Steve Gearin	10	88	0
203	George Grant	1	100	0
155	Graham Eadie	6	68	1
145	John Dorahy	6	63	1

Top 5 try scorers

Tries	Player
16	Tom Mooney
14	Mitch Brennan
14	Larry Corowa
13	Steve Morris
13	Mick Cronin
13	Garry Dowling
13	Steve Edmonds
13	Wayne Smith
13	Wayne Wigham
13	Stephen Martin

Top 5 goal scorers

Goals	Player
100	George Grant
95	Mick Cronin
88	Steve Gearin
68	Graham Eadie
65	Rod Henniker
