= George Grant =

George Grant may refer to:

== Academics ==
- George Grant (philosopher) (1918–1988), Canadian philosopher and political commentator
- George Franklin Grant (1846–1910), American dentistry academic and inventor of an early golf tee
- George Monro Grant (1835–1902), Canadian principal of Queen's College, Kingston, Ontario

== Politicians ==
- George Grant (British politician) (1924–1984), British Labour MP
- George Alfred Grant or Paa Grant (1878–1956), Ghanaian merchant and politician in the Gold Coast
- George Davidson Grant (1870–1915), Canadian politician
- George M. Grant (1897–1982), US Congressman from Alabama
- George Grant Halcrow, Canadian politician
- George Grant (New Hampshire politician), American politician from New Hampshire

== Sportspeople ==
- George Grant (baseball) (1903–1986), American baseball pitcher
- George Grant (rugby league) (born 1956), Australian rugby league player
- George Grant (wrestler) (1925–2010), American professional wrestler
- George Copeland Grant or Jackie Grant (1907–1978), Trinidadian cricketer and teacher
- George F. Grant (1906–2008), American fisherman, author, conservationist
- George Leslie Grant or Bunny Grant (1940–2018), Jamaican boxer
- George Washington Grant (fl. 1919–1922), American businessman and owner of the Boston Braves of the National League

== Others ==
- George Grant (author) (born 1954), American author, essayist, historian, pastor and educator
- George Grant (Scottish entrepreneur) (1823–1878), Scottish founder of Victoria, Kansas, and the American Angus cattle breed
- George A. Grant (1891–1964), American National Park Service photographer
- George B. Grant (1849–1917) American mechanical engineer, inventor, entrepreneur
