= R. Bruce Elder =

Canadian filmmaker and critic

R. Bruce Elder FRSC
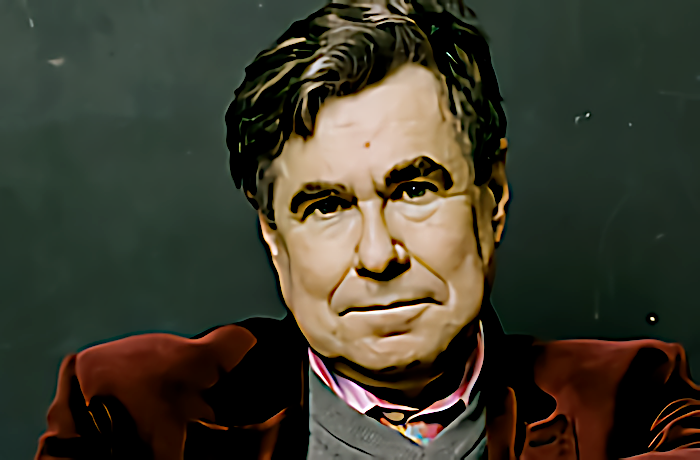
- Born: June 12, 1947 (age 79); Hawkesbury, Ontario, Canada
- Education: McMaster University
- Occupations: filmmaker, writer, critic, curator, and software developer
- Notable work: Books: A Body of Vision (WLU Press); Harmony and Dissent (WLU Press), DADA, Surrealism, and the Cinematic Effect (WLU Press) Cubism and Futurism (WLU Press); Films: Illuminated Texts; Lamentations (A Monument to a Dead World); Consolations (Love is an Ant of Time); A Man whose Life was Full of Woe has been Surprised by Joy; Crack, Brutal Grief; Eros and Wonder
- Movement: Film and avant-garde art movements
- Spouse: Kathryn F. Elder (née LeRoy) (m. 1970)
- Awards: Fellow of the Royal Society of Canada; Governor General's Award

R. Bruce Elder, FRSC (born June 12, 1947) is a Canadian filmmaker, writer, critic, curator, and educator known for his contributions to experimental cinema, film theory, media studies, and aesthetics. His work spans filmmaking, literary criticism, philosophy, communication theory, and the history of avant-garde art. Elder is particularly known for the forty-two-hour film cycle The Book of All the Dead, his writings on experimental cinema and modernist art, and his scholarship on Stan Brakhage, Marshall McLuhan, George Grant, and the Toronto School of Communication Theory.

In 2007, Elder was elected a Fellow of the Royal Society of Canada and received the Governor General's Award in Visual and Media Arts. His films have been exhibited internationally at institutions including the Museum of Modern Art in New York, Centre Pompidou in Paris, Kino Arsenal in Berlin, Anthology Film Archives, the Art Gallery of Ontario, and numerous international film festivals devoted to experimental cinema.

== Early life and education ==
Elder began his artistic and intellectual career while studying philosophy at McMaster University during the late 1960s. There he studied under political philosopher George Parkin Grant, whose writings on technology, ethics, religion, and Canadian identity became a lasting influence on Elder's thought. Grant's engagement with Martin Heidegger's philosophy of technology would later shape Elder's own concerns regarding modernity, media, and the effects of technological systems on human experience.

While attending McMaster, Elder became active in the university's literary and artistic community. During this period he helped organize visits by American poets Kenneth Rexroth, Allen Ginsberg, and Robert Creeley. Elder later recalled that extended conversations with these figures influenced both his understanding of poetry and his subsequent artistic development.

Initially committed to poetry, Elder published an eponymous chapbook in 1970 through Delta Canada, a publishing house founded by poet Louis Dudek. The volume received a favorable review from critic George Woodcock in Canadian Literature. His poetry also appeared in various anthologies and literary journals.

A decisive moment occurred in 1972 when Elder attended the Summer Institute in the Making, Knowing and Judging of Film/Media, organized by Gerald O'Grady through the University Film Studies Center consortium. The institute brought together filmmakers including Stan Brakhage, Hollis Frampton, Ed Emshwiller, Robert Breer, Shirley Clarke, Stan Vanderbeek, and Richard Leacock.

== Career ==
=== Filmmaking ===
Elder emerged as a major figure in Canadian experimental cinema during the 1970s and 1980s. His films combine philosophical inquiry, poetic language, music, visual abstraction, documentary imagery, and complex montage structures. Throughout his career he has explored themes including memory, history, religion, technology, embodiment, sexuality, mortality, ecology, and the relationship between perception and consciousness.

Elder has described his artistic interests as centred on boundaries, transitions, and transformation:

"I am interested in how things go together and what keeps things apart, in divisions, borders, transitions, gradations—especially in the delicate ways in which one thing leads into another and in the ways in which things may be transformed from one state into another. Accordingly, in my films I have worked at exploring the potentials of camera movement, montage, and optical printing."

His early films included Barbara Is a Vision of Loveliness, which received a Canadian Film Award for Best Experimental Film, and The Art of Worldly Wisdom, which received recognition from the Los Angeles Film Critics Association.

=== The Book of All the Dead ===
Elder's ambitious project is The Book of All the Dead, a forty-two-hour cycle produced between 1974 and 1993. The cycle comprises four major regions: Illuminated Texts, Lamentations, Consolations, and Exultations.

The work combines philosophical speculation, autobiographical reflection, literary references, music, theology, mythology, and extensive experimentation with cinematic form. Drawing on sources ranging from Dante, Ezra Pound, Friedrich Nietzsche, and Martin Heidegger to Marshall McLuhan and George Grant, the cycle examines the spiritual, political, and cultural crises of modernity.

Writing in the Images Festival catalogue, Bart Testa described The Book of All the Dead as one of the most ambitious achievements in international avant-garde cinema. He argued that the cycle transformed the condition of artistic belatedness into a productive aesthetic strategy and represented a sustained engagement with questions of history, memory, and cultural inheritance.

=== The Book of Praise ===
Following completion of The Book of All the Dead, Elder began a second major cycle entitled The Book of Praise.

Inspired by Kenneth Rexroth, Dante Alighieri, Marshall McLuhan, Northrop Frye, Johann Sebastian Bach, and Christian theology, the cycle examines themes of nature, spirituality, embodiment, ecological awareness, and redemption.

Films in the cycle include A Man Whose Life Was Full of Woe Has Been Surprised by Joy (1997), Crack, Brutal Grief (2000), Eros and Wonder (2003), Infunde Lumen Cordibus (2004), The Young Prince (2007), What Troubles the Peace at Brandenburg? (2011), Return to Nature! (2012), A Gathering of Crystals (2015), and Alone (All Flesh Shall See It Together) (2023).

== Research ==
Elder's work in media technologies formed an important component of his academic and artistic practice. In addition to his activities as a filmmaker and theorist, he had training in applied mathematics and computer science and developed computer applications for digital image processing and signal manipulation. According to the Modern Literature and Culture Research Centre at Ryerson University, Elder developed software applications that applied signal-processing algorithms to filmmaking and maintained a long-standing interest in digital image processing and technological innovation.

A profile published by the Social Sciences and Humanities Research Council noted that Elder acquired expertise in applied mathematics and computer science in order to incorporate emerging technologies into his artistic work. The article reports that he developed an image-processing application, informally known as the "Cagey One," which enabled filmmakers to experiment with geometric distortions and new forms of image transformation. The project reflected his broader interest in the intersection of technology, aesthetics, mathematics, and experimental cinema.

Scholarship and criticism

Beginning in the 2000s, Elder developed a series of studies examining what he termed the "new paragone." Rather than arguing that cinema was merely influenced by modernist artistic movements, Elder proposed that many twentieth-century artists viewed cinema as a potentially supreme modern art form and reshaped painting, poetry, dance, and other artistic practices in response to cinema's distinctive capacities.

His later scholarship expanded these investigations into the relationship between artistic innovation, technology, media theory, and modernism, culminating in major studies including Harmony and Dissent (2008), DADA, Surrealism, and the Cinematic Effect (2013), and Cubism and Futurism: Spiritual Machines and the Cinematic Effect (2018).

=== The Cinema We Need ===
In 1985 Elder published "The Cinema We Need," a manifesto advocating a cinema grounded in spontaneity, perception, multiplicity, and philosophical reflection.

The essay criticized dominant tendencies within Canadian cinema and argued for a more experimental and spiritually ambitious film culture. Its publication generated substantial debate within Canadian film criticism.

Cinema Canada devoted a special forum to responses by Bart Testa, Piers Handling, Peter Harcourt, Michael Dorland, Geoff Pevere, and Elder himself.

Subsequent scholars have identified the debate as one of the most important discussions of national cinema and cultural identity in Canadian film history. The essay was later anthologized in several collections devoted to Canadian cinema and film manifestos.

== Editorial and curatorial work ==
In 1980, he guest-edited a special issue of Cine-Tracts devoted to Canadian experimental film. He later served on the editorial committee of Parol: Quaderni d'Arte e di Epistemologia and became a member of the editorial committee of New Explorations: Studies in Culture and Communication.

Elder has curated and presented programs devoted to experimental film, Canadian cinema, communication theory, and avant-garde art. His programming and public presentation activities have included collaborations with institutions such as the Art Gallery of Ontario, Cinematheque Ontario, Images Festival, CineCycle, universities, cinematheques, and international conferences devoted to film and media studies.

His curatorial activities have included screenings, retrospectives, lectures, and discussions devoted to filmmakers such as Jack Chambers and Stan Brakhage, as well as programs examining the history and development of experimental cinema in Canada and internationally.

== Filmography ==
The Book of All the Dead (1975–1994)
(Listed in order of appearance in the Cycle rather than by production date)

- Region One: The System of Dante's Hell
  - Breath/Light/Birth (1975)
  - The Art of Worldly Wisdom (1979)
  - 1857 (Fool's Gold) (1981)
  - Illuminated Texts (1982)
  - Lamentations: A Monument to the Dead World, Part 1: The Dream of the Last Historian (1985)
  - Sweet Love Remembered (1980)
  - Lamentations: A Monument to the Dead World, Part 2: The Sublime Calculation (1985)
  - Permutations and Combinations (1976)
- Region Two: Consolations (Love Is an Art of Time)
  - Consolations (Love Is an Art of Time) Part 1: The Fugitive Gods (1988)
  - Consolations (Love Is an Art of Time) Part 2: The Lighted Clearing (1988)
  - Consolations (Love Is an Art of Time) Part 3: The Body and the World (1988)
- Region Three: Exultations (In Light of the Great Giving)
  - Flesh Angels (1990)
  - Look! We Have Come Through! (1978)
  - Newton and Me (1990)
  - Barbara Is a Vision of Loveliness (1976)
  - Azure Serene (1992)
  - She Is Away (1976)
  - Exultations: In Light of the Great Giving (1993)
  - Burying the Dead: Into the Light (1993)
  - Trace (1980)
  - Et Resurrectus Est (1994)

The Book Of Praise (1997 – )

  - A Man Whose Life Was Full Of Woe Has Been Surprised By Joy (1997)
  - Crack, Brutal Grief (2000)
  - Eros and Wonder (2003)
  - Infunde Lumen Cordibus (2004)
  - The Young Prince (2007)
  - What Troubles The Peace At Brandenberg? (2011)
  - A Gathering Of Crystals (2015)

== Bibliography ==
- Elder, R. Bruce; Television, Academy of Canadian Cinema & (1989). Image and Identity: Reflections on Canadian Film and Culture. Wilfrid Laurier Univ. Press. ISBN 978-0-88920-956-5.
- Elder, R. Bruce; Ontario, Art Gallery of (1989). The Body in Film. Art Gallery of Ontario. ISBN 978-0-919777-84-2.
- Elder, R. Bruce (14 October 1998). A Body of Vision: Representations of the Body in Recent Film and Poetry. Wilfrid Laurier Univ. Press. ISBN 978-0-88920-328-0.
- Elder, R. Bruce (1998). The Films of Stan Brakhage in the American Tradition of Ezra Pound, Gertrude Stein and Charles Olson. Wilfrid Laurier Univ. Press. ISBN 978-0-88920-275-7.
- Elder, R. Bruce (22 April 2010). Harmony and Dissent: Film and Avant-garde Art Movements in the Early Twentieth Century. Wilfrid Laurier Univ. Press. ISBN 978-1-55458-086-6.
- Elder, R. Bruce (15 October 2015). DADA, Surrealism, and the Cinematic Effect. Wilfrid Laurier Univ. Press. ISBN 978-1-55458-641-7.
- Elder, R. Bruce (2018). Cubism and Futurism: spiritual machines and the cinematic effect. Waterloo, [Ontario]: Wilfrid Laurier university press. ISBN 978-1771122450.
