= Marvin Hicks =

Australian rugby league player

Personal information
- Full name: Marvin James Hicks
- Born: 3 March 1960 (age 65)

Playing information
- Position: Five-eighth
Club
Years	Team	Pld	T	G	FG	P
1980–82	Penrith Panthers	27	14	0	0	42

Marvin James Hicks (born 3 March 1960) is an Australian former rugby league player for the Penrith Panthers.

A Fairfield City junior, Hicks established himself as the Penrith five-eighth early in the 1980 NSWRFL season, having only got started in grade football that year. He topped Penrith's try-scoring in 1980 with 12 tries, before suffering a setback the following year when he had his jaw broken in two places, forcing him to sit out the season. In 1982, Hicks made his comeback in the opening round, but didn't feature again in first grade until the back end of the season, having once more broken his jaw.
