= Judith Thackaberry =

American politician

Member-elect of the New Hampshire House of Representatives from the Sullivan 5th district
- Assuming office December 2026
- Succeeding: George Grant

Personal details
- Party: Democratic

Judith Thackaberry is an American politician. A member of the Democratic Party, she is the member-elect for the Sullivan 5th district of the New Hampshire House of Representatives.
