= David Michael (rugby league) =

Australian rugby league footballer

Personal information
- Full name: David Michael
- Born: 31 July 1958 (age 68) Sydney, New South Wales, Australia

Playing information
- Position: Wing
Club
Years	Team	Pld	T	G	FG	P
1980–84	Eastern Suburbs	53	8	0	0	29
Representative
Years	Team	Pld	T	G	FG	P
1979	NSW Country	1	0	0	0	0

David Michael (born 31 July 1958) is an Australian former professional rugby league footballer who played for Eastern Suburbs in NSWRL competition during the 1980s. He played as a wing.

== Playing career ==
After representing New South Wales Country in 1979, Michael made his debut for Eastern Suburbs in Round 1 1980 against North Sydney at the Sydney Sports Ground. Easts would go on to reach the 1980 NSWRL grand final against Canterbury-Bankstown with Michael being selected to play on the wing. Canterbury went into halftime leading 7–4. In the second half, Canterbury player Greg Brentnall put up a bomb which headed in Michael's direction. Canterbury winger Steve Gearin jumped over the top of Michael and caught the ball scoring a try in the process. Easts never recovered from the try and lost the grand final 18–4. The victory was Canterbury's first premiership in 38 years.

In 1981, Eastern Suburbs finished as minor premiers but crashed out of the finals series losing at the preliminary final stage. Michael missed the finals due to injury. The following year, Eastern Suburbs again reached the finals but were defeated by reigning premiers Parramatta in the preliminary final 33–0.

Michael played with Easts until the end of the 1984 season where the club finished second last on the table before retiring.
