= Mitch Brennan =

Australian professional rugby league footballer and coach

Personal information
- Full name: Mitch Brennan
- Born: 30 October 1954 (age 71) Brisbane, Queensland, Australia

Playing information
- Position: Wing, Fullback, Centre
Club
Years	Team	Pld	T	G	FG	P
	Souths (Brisbane)
1978–80	St. George Dragons	50	35	0	0	109
1981–82	South Sydney	41	16	0	0	48
1983–85	Redcliffe	58	32	0	0	128
1986–88	Canberra Raiders	8	0	0	0	0
	Total	157	83	0	0	285
Representative
Years	Team	Pld	T	G	FG	P
1981–83	Queensland	4	3	0	0	11

Coaching information
Club
Years	Team	Gms	W	D	L	W%
1996–97	Wakefield Trinity	40	22	2	16	55

Mitch Brennan (born 30 October 1954) is a retired Australian rugby league footballer and former coach. A Queensland State of Origin representative three-quarter, he played club football during the 1970s, and 1980s in Queensland for Souths and Redcliffe and in New South Wales for South Sydney, Canberra and St. George, with whom he won the 1979 premiership. After playing he became coach of Wakefield Trinity from 1996 to 1997.

== Club career ==
A stylish three-quarter with a great turn of pace, Mitch Brennan trialed with the Canadian Football League side the Toronto Argonauts in 1975 and was offered a contract before visa restrictions prevented his Canadian football career. He returned to Australia and was graded with Brisbane Souths.

St. George Dragons

His NSWRL career began controversially when in the 1977 pre-season, he was coaxed by his former coach Harry Bath to play for St George in a trial match at Grafton. Brennan played under the pseudonym 'Mickey Lane' because he was still in contract negotiations with Brisbane Souths. He was recognised and fined $500. He joined St George in 1978.

He was a twice winner of the mid-week competition's 'golden try' award in 1978 & 1981. He was the NSWRL's equal leading try-scorer (16t) in season 1979 and played on the wing and scored a try in St George's 1979 Grand Final win over Canterbury.

Souths and Canberra

Brennan switched to the South Sydney Rabbitohs in 1981 and played 41 first grade matches over two seasons. He returned to Queensland in 1983 and played with the Redcliffe Dolphins and captaining them until 1985. In 1986 Brennan returned to the NSWRL with the Canberra Raiders. His three seasons there up till retirement in 1988 were significantly interrupted by injury and he made only 8 first grade appearances.for Canberra.

== Origin career ==
He made his State of Origin debut for Queensland in the sole game played under Origin criteria in 1981. He appeared in games I and III of 1982 at centre and full-back respectively and in game III of 1983 on the wing. He scored three tries in his four Origin appearances.

== Sources ==
http://www.showroom.com.au/dragons/dragonshistory Dragons History site
https://web.archive.org/web/20070817154435/http://www.bulldogs.com.au/main.php Bulldogs Player Histories (Official Site)
https://web.archive.org/web/20070829213148/http://www.raiders.com.au/www/history/alltime/ Canberra Raiders All Time Player List (Official Site)

Sporting positions
Preceded by Paul Harkin; 1995-1996	Coach Wakefield Trinity; 1996-1997	Succeeded by Andy Kelly; 1997-2000
