= George Grant (rugby league) =

Australian rugby league footballer

Personal information
- Full name: George Roderic Grant
- Born: 9 April 1956 (age 70) Crookwell, New South Wales, Australia

Playing information
- Position: Second-row
Club
Years	Team	Pld	T	G	FG	P
1976–82	St George Dragons	51	1	183	0	369
- Source: Whiticker/Hudson

George Grant (born 9 April 1956) is an Australian former rugby league footballer who played in the 1970s and 1980s.

== Career ==
Originally from Crookwell, New South Wales but graded from Allawah, Grant played seven seasons at St. George between 1976 and 1982.

A prolific goal-kicker, Grant won a premiership with St. George playing in the victorious 1979 team that defeated Canterbury-Bankstown. Grant had a stellar season in 1979, scoring one try and kicking 104 goals. His career drew to a close at the end of the 1982 season.
