= George Grant (New Hampshire politician) =

American politician

Member of New Hampshire House of Representatives for Sullivan County's 5th district
- Incumbent
- Assumed office December 4, 2024
- Preceded by: Linda Tanner
- Succeeded by: Judith Thackaberry (elect)

Personal details
- Party: Republican

George C. Grant is an American politician. He is a member of the New Hampshire House of Representatives.
