= Steve McFarlane =

Australian rugby league footballer

Personal information
- Full name: Stephen Glenn McFarlane
- Born: 21 October 1958 (age 66) Annandale, New South Wales, Australia

Playing information
- Position: Wing
Club
Years	Team	Pld	T	G	FG	P
1979–83	Eastern Suburbs	63	19	0	0	63

Steve "Bozo" McFarlane is an Australian former professional rugby league footballer who played for Eastern Suburbs in NSWRL competition. He played as a wing.

== Playing career ==
McFarlane made his debut for Eastern Suburbs in Round 12 of the 1979 season against Balmain. The following year, McFarlane was a member of the Easts side which reached the 1980 NSWRL grand final against Canterbury. He was denied a try in the first half of the match as Canterbury won their first premiership in 38 years, 18–4. The following season, McFarlane was a member of the Easts side which made the preliminary final, but lost 15-5 to Newtown. McFarlane played a further two seasons before retiring at the end of 1983.
