= Wayne Miranda =

Australian rugby league footballer (born 1957)

Personal information
- Full name: Wayne Miranda
- Born: 3 July 1957 (age 68) Sydney, New South Wales, Australia

Playing information
- Position: Fullback, Centre, Wing
Club
Years	Team	Pld	T	G	FG	P
1978–83	Balmain Tigers	91	12	252	0	541
- Source: As of 15 May 2019

Wayne Miranda (born 3 July 1957) is an Australian former rugby league footballer who played in the 1970s and 1980s. He played for Balmain in the New South Wales Rugby League (NSWRL) competition.

== Background ==
Miranda was born in Sydney, New South Wales, Australia and played his junior rugby league for Birchgrove Scorpions. Miranda is the son of Ray Miranda who played for Balmain in the 1940s.

== Playing career ==
Miranda made his first grade debut for Balmain in Round 1 1978 against Penrith at Leichhardt Oval kicking 5 goals in a 16-8 victory. Between 1979 and 1982, Miranda finished as the club's top point scorer. Balmain continued to struggle on the field during those years and finished last in 1981.

In 1983, Balmain finished 4th on the table and qualified for the finals. Balmain was defeated in the semi-final by St George 17-14. Miranda departed the club at the end of 1983 and finished as Balmain's 5th highest point scorer with 541 points.
