= Steve Gearin =

Australian rugby league footballer

Personal information
- Born: 29 March 1958 (age 68) Sydney, New South Wales, Australia

Playing information
- Position: Wing, Five-eighth
Club
| Years | Team | Pld | T | G | FG | P |
|---|---|---|---|---|---|---|
| 1975–82 | Canterbury Bankstown Bulldogs | 114 | 63 | 405 | 0 | 914 |
| 1983–84 | St. George Dragons | 47 | 15 | 161 | 0 | 382 |
| 1985 | Canterbury Bankstown Bulldogs | 13 | 7 | 32 | 0 | 92 |
| 1986 | Manly Sea Eagles | 3 | 0 | 0 | 0 | 0 |
| | Total | 177 | 85 | 598 | 0 | 1388 |

Steve Gearin (born 29 March 1958) is an Australian former rugby league footballer who represented Canterbury, St. George and Manly in the New South Wales Rugby League (NSWRL) during the 1970s and 1980s. A key member of the Bulldogs during the 'entertainers' era, one of his finest moments was kicking six conversions from six attempts in Canterbury's 1980 Grand Final victory. He was the top point scorer in the NSWRL in 1980 and 1984.

On 9 February 2020, he was inducted into the Bulldogs Club as a life member.

== Career ==
Canterbury-Bankstown Bulldogs

"GB (Brentnall) kicked the ball, I ran after it and it pretty much fell into my arms. It was one of those lucky things. It closed up the match, one of those moments, Very proud and very respectful of the situation too. The Bulldogs hadn't won a comp for about 40-odd years. Easts were a good side, we played pretty good footy all year. I looked straight up to the old man, who was sitting in the Ladies Stand, I thought to myself, 'what have I done here!?’. Everything just went right. It was one of those freak things that just happen. I remember thinking, 'how good is that?’."

— Gearin Re-living his famous try in the 1980 NSWRFL Grand Final (2015).

Gearin was born in Sydney of Irish descent. In 1974, he was spotted by Canterbury-Bankstown CEO Peter Moore when he was playing for Christian Brothers Lewisham in the Commonwealth Bank Cup Schoolboys rugby league competition. He joined Canterbury-Bankstown in 1975. He made his first grade début for the Berries during the 1976 NSWRFL season in Canterbury's 23–20 win against the Newtown Jets at Belmore Sports Ground. At the end of his first year of first grade his stat ended up playing six games, scoring two tries for six points. In 1977 he scored five tries in a Pre-Season trial match against the Queanbeyan Blues. His 1977 season was interrupted by injury.

He became a regular first grader in 1978. Steve played in Canterbury's Heartbreaking 22–15 loss in the 1978 NSWRFL season's Qualifying Final against the Parramatta Eels. In 1979 he broke George Taylforth's 1967 goal kicking record of 204 points in the process. He played in Canterbury's 17 – 13 1979 NSWRFL season's Grand Final loss to the St. George Dragons where he scored one try and booted two goals. He scored seven points on Grand Final day. In 1980 he was the New South Wales Rugby League's top point scorer. He played in Canterbury's 18 – 4 1980 Grand Final victory over the Eastern Suburbs Roosters where he scored one of the greatest ever 1st grade Australian rugby league Grand Final tries in history in which he chased, caught and grounded a classic try off a Greg Brentnall bomb.

He also booted six goals from six attempts. He scored 15 points on Grand Final day a Club Record. His 1980 stat ended up playing 24 games, scoring 14 tries, booting 89 goals for 220 points. His 1981 and 1982 seasons were again interrupted by injury. In the 1981 season Gearin scored a Hat-Trick three Tries against the Balmain Tigers at Leichhardt Oval.

St. George Dragons

In 1983 Gearin joined the St. George Dragons. In the 1983 Qualifying Final he kicked the two winning goals for the Saints to beat the Balmain Tigers 17–14. In the 1983 Semi Final he played in the Dragons' 26–24 loss to Canterbury-Bankstown. In 1984 he again was the New South Wales Rugby League's top point scorer. His last game for St. George was in the 1984 Preliminary Final against the Parramatta Eels where they lost 8–7. At the end of his two-year stint at the Dragons, his stat ended up playing 47 games, scoring 15 tries and booting 161 goals for 382 points.

Later career

Gearin returned to Canterbury in 1985. In the 1985 NSWRL season he scored one try against the Manly-Warringah Sea Eagles and scored one try and booted three goals against the Eastern Suburbs Roosters. Gearin missed out in Canterbury's 7-6 1985 Grand Final win over former club St. George, but he was still in attendance at the Sydney Cricket Ground and was part of the lap of honour with the squad after winning the premiership on Grand Final day. At the end of the 1985 season he played 13 games, scoring seven tries and booting 32 goals for 92 points. In 1986 he didn't play any First Grade for the Canterbury side and overall since returning to Belmore, he didn't see eye to eye with first grade coach Warren Ryan as he was a very defensive-minded tactician of a coach and defending was not one of Gearin's strengths. His last game for Canterbury was at the Sydney Cricket Ground in Reserve Grade in round 8 in their 26–16 win over the South Sydney Rabbitohs.

After 9 Rounds of the 1986 NSWRL season Gearin lost patience as he was fed up playing in Reserve Grade and he realised that under Warren Ryan and competing for a starting spot on the wing with young, talented and hungry players like Steve O'Brien, Matthew Callinan and Sandy Campbell, he was not part of the club's future plans in first grade and as a result, the next week he requested a release from the club which was accepted by club CEO Peter Moore and Gearin decided to join the Manly Warringah Sea Eagles in search for any opportunity to revive his First Grade career and for geographical reasons as he lives and works in the Manly area. He only ended up playing a few first-grade games for Manly and played the rest of the 1986 season in Reserve Grade. His last game of his Career was at the Sydney Cricket Ground in the 1986 Reserve Grade Semi Final for Manly against the North Sydney Bears where Manly lost 36–20. At the end of the 1986 season he decided to Retire due to a mixture of falling out of love and interest with the game and wanting to focus on his School-teaching career and his family. He never played International Rugby League or State of Origin. He only played for NSW City Seconds in 1981.

To this day, Gearin is still a School teacher at St Luke's Grammar School on the Northern Beaches of Sydney.
