= John Tobin (rugby league) =

Australian rugby league footballer

Personal information
- Full name: John Roland Boyd Tobin
- Born: 12 August 1959 (age 67) Sydney, New South Wales, Australia

Playing information
- Position: Lock, Loose forward
Club
Years	Team	Pld	T	G	FG	P
1978–87	Eastern Suburbs	125	16	0	0	57
Representative
Years	Team	Pld	T	G	FG	P
1984	City NSW	1	0	0	0	0
- Source: As of 30 June 2026

John Roland Boyd Tobin (born 12 August 1959) is an Australian former rugby league footballer who played for the Eastern Suburbs (Sydney Roosters). His preferred position was at lock forward.

Tobin was arrested on 25 December 2016 and charged with importing cocaine through the Sydney Fish Market.
