= Rod Henniker =

Australian rugby league footballer

Personal information
- Full name: Rod Henniker
- Born: 17 March 1958 (age 68) Wollongong, New South Wales, Australia

Playing information
- Position: Second-row, Lock
Club
Years	Team	Pld	T	G	FG	P
1979–81	North Sydney	52	6	132	1	283
1982–84	Illawarra Steelers	45	6	4	0	30
	Total	97	12	136	1	313
- Source: As of 25 February 2019

Rod Henniker is an Australian former professional rugby league footballer who played in the 1970s and 1980s. Henniker was a foundation player for Illawarra, playing in the club's first game.

== Background ==
Henniker was born in Wollongong, New South Wales, Australia.

== Playing career ==
Henniker made his first grade debut against Cronulla-Sutherland in Round 1 1979 at North Sydney Oval with the match finishing in a 34–7 loss.

North Sydney went on to win only 2 games in 1979 and finished last on the table but Henniker did finish as top point scorer with 136 points. In 1980, Henniker again finished as top point scorer for Norths with 130 points. In 1981, Henniker made 12 appearances for Norths but left at the end of the season due to a falling out with North Sydney coach Ron Willey.

In 1982, Henniker joined newly admitted Illawarra and played in the club's first ever game which was against Penrith at WIN Stadium and ended in a 17–7 loss.

Henniker played 3 seasons at Illawarra as the club struggled towards the bottom of the ladder. Henniker retired at the end of the 1984 season.
