= Wayne Wigham =

Australian rugby league footballer

Personal information
- Born: 11 April 1958 (age 67); Sydney, New South Wales, Australia

Playing information
Club
Years	Team	Pld	T	G	FG	P
1976–83	Balmain Tigers	135	56	0	0	169
1984	North Sydney Bears	8	3	0	0	12
1985	Western Suburbs	14	6	0	0	24
	Total	157	65	0	0	205

Wayne Wigham (born 11 April 1958) is an Australian former professional rugby league footballer who played in the 1970s and 1980s. He played most of his career at the Balmain Tigers, but he also played for the North Sydney Bears and Western Suburbs Magpies. He mostly played as a centre, but also played the occasional game on the wing.

== Playing career ==
Wigham, a local Balmain junior from the North Ryde Hawks club, started his career with the Balmain Tigers while still in high school during the 1976 season. In 1980, despite the Tigers comfortably missing out on a finals berth, Wigham finished the 1980 season along with John Ribot of the Western Suburbs Magpies as the season's top try scorer with 16 tries. Wigham's stint with the Tigers ended at the conclusion of the 1983 season. He spent eight seasons at the Tigers, playing in 135 games and scoring 56 tries.

In 1984, Wigham joined the North Sydney Bears, after a one-year spell at the Bears in the 1984 season, in which he made 8 appearances and scored 3 tries, Wigham left Norths at the conclusion of the 1984 season. In 1985, Wigham joined the Western Suburbs Magpies, this would be his final season of first grade. He finished his career having played 157 games, and scoring 65 tries.
