= John Jansen (rugby league) =

Australian rugby league footballer

Personal information
- Full name: John Jansen
- Born: 26 March 1955 (age 71) Wollongong, New South Wales, Australia

Playing information
- Position: Second-row
Club
Years	Team	Pld	T	G	FG	P
1976–83	St. George Dragons	101	21	0	0	65
Representative
Years	Team	Pld	T	G	FG	P
1974	Illawarra Firsts	1	0	0	0	0

John Jansen is an Australian former rugby league footballer who played in the 1970s and 1980s.

== Career ==
Originally from Corrimal, New South Wales, John 'JJ' Jansen first got noticed as a 19 year old playing for Illawarra Firsts against the touring Great Britain Lions in 1974 in a side coached by Norm Provan and captained by former Great Britain hardman Cliff Watson.

Jansen came to the St. George Dragons in 1976, as a 21-year-old. He had an immediate impact in the lower grades and cemented a first grade position in the second-row alongside Robert Stone and blossomed under the guidance of master coach Harry Bath.

Jansen won a premiership with St. George in 1977, he played in the drawn 1977 Grand Final and scored a marvelous try in the 1977 Grand Final replay. He would have been picked in the 1979 Grand Final squad if a chronic knee injury hadn't ruined his season.

1983 was his last season, and due to a season-ending injury to Craig Young, John Jansen captained the St. George side to the semi-finals. He later coached the lower grades at St. George and the Illawarra Steelers.

Rugby League legend and Immortal, Johnny Raper stated in the Big League Magazine on 17 September 1977 about John Jansen and Robert Stone that "They are potentially the best pair of second rowers St. George have ever had."
