= Stephen Butler =

Stephen or Steven Butler may refer to:

- Stephen Butler (businessman) (born 1944), American business executive and writer
- Stephen Butler (rugby league) (born 1954), Australian rugby league player
- Stephen Butler (British Army officer) (1880–1964)
- Steven Butler (speedway rider) in 1991 Australian Individual Speedway Championship

== See also ==
- Steve Butler (disambiguation)
