= Tony Graham (rugby league) =

Australian rugby league footballer

Personal information
- Full name: Anthony Graham
- Born: 1956; Australia

Playing information
- Position: Wing
Club
Years	Team	Pld	T	G	FG	P
1976 & 1980	Cronulla-Sutherland Sharks	19	6	0	0	18
1977–78	St. George Dragons	14	6	0	0	18
	Total	33	12	0	0	36
- Source: Whiticker/Hudson

Tony Graham was an Australian rugby league player from the 1970s.

== Career ==
A speedy winger, Tony Graham started his career at the Cronulla-Sutherland Sharks in 1976. The following year Tony Graham was awarded a two-year contract with the St. George Dragons and joined the 'Bath's Babes' squad, overseen by the mastercoach, Harry Bath. He started off 1977 in first grade, but eventually lost his place in the team to the emerging talent of Stephen Bulter. Although Graham was a reserve back for the 1977 Grand Final, his later appearances for the club were mostly in the reserve grade team.

Tony Graham returned to the Cronulla-Sutherland Sharks for one last season in 1980, and then retired.
