= Rod McGregor (rugby league) =

Australian rugby league footballer (born 1955)

Personal information
- Full name: Rodney McGregor
- Born: 1955 (age 69–70); Yass, New South Wales

Playing information
- Position: Five-eighth, Halfback
Club
| Years | Team | Pld | T | G | FG | P |
|---|---|---|---|---|---|---|
| 1977–78 | St. George Dragons | 25 | 1 | 0 | 0 | 3 |
| 1979 | South Sydney | 6 | 0 | 0 | 0 | 0 |
| | Total | 31 | 1 | 0 | 0 | 3 |
Representative
| Years | Team | Pld | T | G | FG | P |
| 1977 | New South Wales | 1 | 0 | 0 | 0 | 0 |

Rod McGregor (born 1955) is an Australian former rugby league footballer who played as a five-eighth and halfback in the 1970s.

== Playing career ==
McGregor came to St. George from Yass, New South Wales, and under the new coach Harry Bath and went straight into first grade.

He is one of very few players to win a premiership in their debut season, but he did just that as a part of the 'Bath's Babes' St. George team that won the 1977 Grand Final.

He also represented New South Wales against Great Britain in 1977. The club did not perform well in 1978, and Rod McGregor decided to join South Sydney for 1979. He retired at the end of that season.
