= Bruce Starkey =

Australian rugby league footballer

Personal information
- Full name: Bruce Richard Starkey
- Born: 18 November 1953 (age 71); Sydney, New South Wales, Australia

Playing information
- Height: 5 ft 11 in (180 cm)
- Weight: 14 st (196 lb; 89 kg)
- Position: Prop
Club
Years	Team	Pld	T	G	FG	P
1974–82	St George Dragons	128	13	0	0	39
Representative
Years	Team	Pld	T	G	FG	P
1979	New South Wales	1	0	0	0	0

Bruce Starkey (born 18 November 1953) is an Australian former rugby league footballer who played who played in Sydney's NSWRFL competition in the 1970s and 1980s.

== Career ==
A St. George junior from the Arncliffe Scots Club, Starkey went on to become a dual premiership winner with the St George Dragons. He was a powerful member of the St George forward pack in the victorious 1977 Grand Final and 1979 Grand Final teams that were coached by the legendary Harry Bath. He also played in the drawn 1977 Grand Final draw. Starkey retired at the end of the 1982 season, and saw out his playing days at Cessnock, New South Wales.

== Accolades ==
Starkey was awarded Life Membership of the St. George Dragons in 1993.
