= Robert Finch (rugby league) =

Australian rugby league footballer

Personal information
- Full name: Robert Finch
- Born: 8 July 1956 (age 70) Maitland, New South Wales, Australia

Playing information
- Height: 6 ft 0 in (1.83 m)
- Weight: 13 st 0 lb (83 kg)
- Position: Centre
Club
Years	Team	Pld	T	G	FG	P
1974–80	St George Dragons	118	26	0	0	78
Representative
Years	Team	Pld	T	G	FG	P
1981	NSW Country	1	0	0	0	0
- Relatives: Brett Finch (son)

Robert Finch (born 8 July 1956) is an Australian former rugby league footballer who played in the 1970s and 1980s.

== Playing career ==
A dual premiership winner with the St George Dragons, Finch played seven seasons with the Dragons between 1974 and 1980, including the 1977 and 1979 premiership victories. He started out as an Australian schoolboy representative on the 1972-73 tour of England and was from Maitland, New South Wales. He also won the Under-23 Grand Final with St George Dragons in his debut season. He played most of his first grade career under the astute coaching of Harry Bath.

After his NSWRFL grade career was over, he moved to Newcastle in 1981 and represented Country Firsts that year.

== Coaching and officialdom ==
Post-playing Finch moved into coaching with Newcastle Knights in the lower grades and an administrative career with Super League and Canberra Raiders. In later years, he became the referees coordinator with the NRL.

Finch is the father of the former NRL and representative player, Brett Finch.
