= Stephen Butler (rugby league) =

Australian rugby league footballer

Personal information
- Full name: Stephen Butler
- Born: 1953 (age 72–73)

Playing information
- Position: Wing
Club
Years	Team	Pld	T	G	FG	P
1977–80	St. George Dragons	36	12	0	0	36

Stephen Butler (born 1953) was an Australian former rugby league footballer who played in Sydney's NSWRFL competition in the 1970s. He was a two-time premiership winner in his three-year career in the top grade.

== Career ==
Butler came through the junior ranks at St. George S.G. Ball Cup and Jersey Flegg Cup teams. He was graded in 1976 and played most of the year in the Under 23s although he won a Premiership with the Dragons reserve grade team in 1976 as a late replacement for Owen O'Donnell.

He won a premiership with St. George in his debut first grade year in 1977 after replacing Tony Graham in the starting line up. He played wing in the 1977 drawn Grand Final and the 1977 Grand Final replay and had a marvellous year under the coaching of Harry Bath.

He played reserve grade in 1978, and was a reserve back in the 1979 Grand Final taking the field late in the match to replace the injured Michael Sorridimi. Butler retired in 1980.
