= Bryson Goodwin =

NZ international rugby league footballer

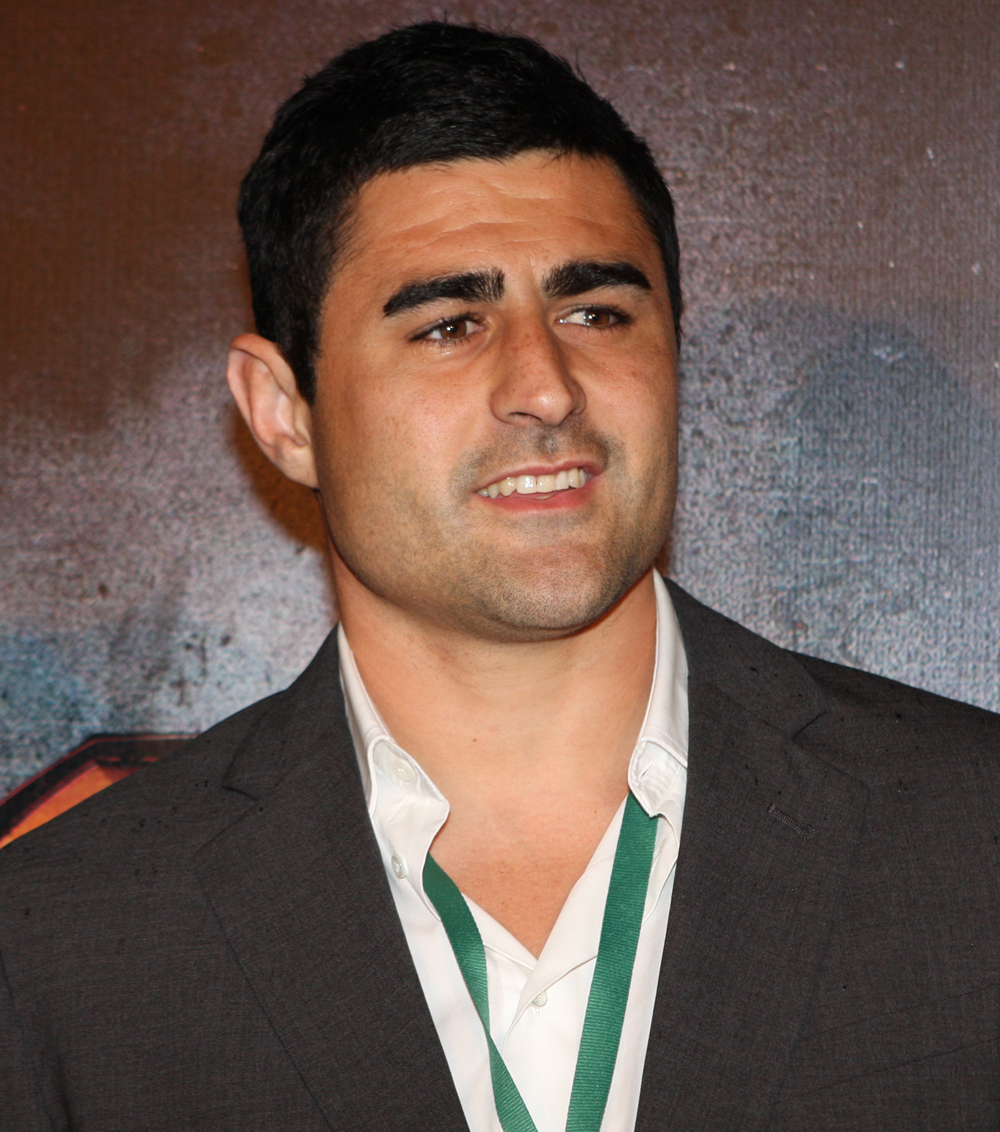

Personal information
- Born: 30 December 1985 (age 40) Parkes, New South Wales, Australia

Playing information
- Height: 186 cm (6 ft 1 in)
- Weight: 100 kg (15 st 10 lb)
- Position: Centre, Wing
Club
Years	Team	Pld	T	G	FG	P
2007–08	Cronulla Sharks	9	2	0	0	8
2009–12	Canterbury Bulldogs	68	31	111	0	346
2013–17	South Sydney	99	37	25	0	198
2018–19	Warrington Wolves	61	26	43	0	190
2020	Cronulla Sharks	7	4	1	0	18
	Total	244	100	180	0	760
Representative
Years	Team	Pld	T	G	FG	P
2009–13	New Zealand	10	8	13	0	58
2020	Māori All Stars	1	0	0	0	0
- Father: Ted Goodwin
- Relatives: Bronx Goodwin (brother); Luke Goodwin (brother); Joel Reddy (brother-in-law)

Bryson Goodwin (born 30 December 1985) is a former New Zealand international rugby league footballer who last played as a goal-kicking centre or winger for the Cronulla-Sutherland Sharks in the National Rugby League.

He previously played for the Canterbury-Bankstown Bulldogs and the South Sydney Rabbitohs in the NRL, and the Warrington Wolves in the Super League. He was a part of the South Sydney Rabbitohs squad that won the 2014 NRL Premiership, being named on an extended bench for the final, however, he did not play.

== Background ==
Goodwin was born in Parkes, New South Wales, Australia. Goodwin is the son of former Australia representative, Ted Goodwin who is of New Zealander descent. Bryson's New Zealander paternal grandparents, Lester Jarvis Goodwin, was a Pākehā (European New Zealander) and Rosina Marie (née Tewera), was a Māori. Bryson's mother is Australian. He is the younger brother of former players Bronx and Luke Goodwin. Goodwin's sister Rearne is married to former Rabbitohs teammate Joel Reddy, making him his brother-in-law.

As a youth, Goodwin and his family moved to Perth while his brother Luke was playing for the Perth-based Western Reds, while Bryson was also the ball boy.

He played his junior football for the Canning Bulldogs and the South Perth Lions in Western Australian Rugby League before moving back to Sydney and playing for the Gymea Gorillas. Goodwin attended Endeavour Sports High, playing in an Arrive Alive Cup final alongside former Rabbitohs teammate Beau Champion. He was also a member of the successful 2003 Endeavour Sports High debating team.

== Playing career ==
=== Cronulla-Sutherland Sharks (2007–2008) ===
Goodwin was a Cronulla junior, playing for the Gymea Gorillas in the local Cronulla-Sutherland District competition. He progressed through the Sharks lower grade teams, the under-20s and reserve grade, before making his first grade debut for the Sharks in round 24 of the 2007 season, miraculously just eight weeks after breaking his leg in reserve grade.

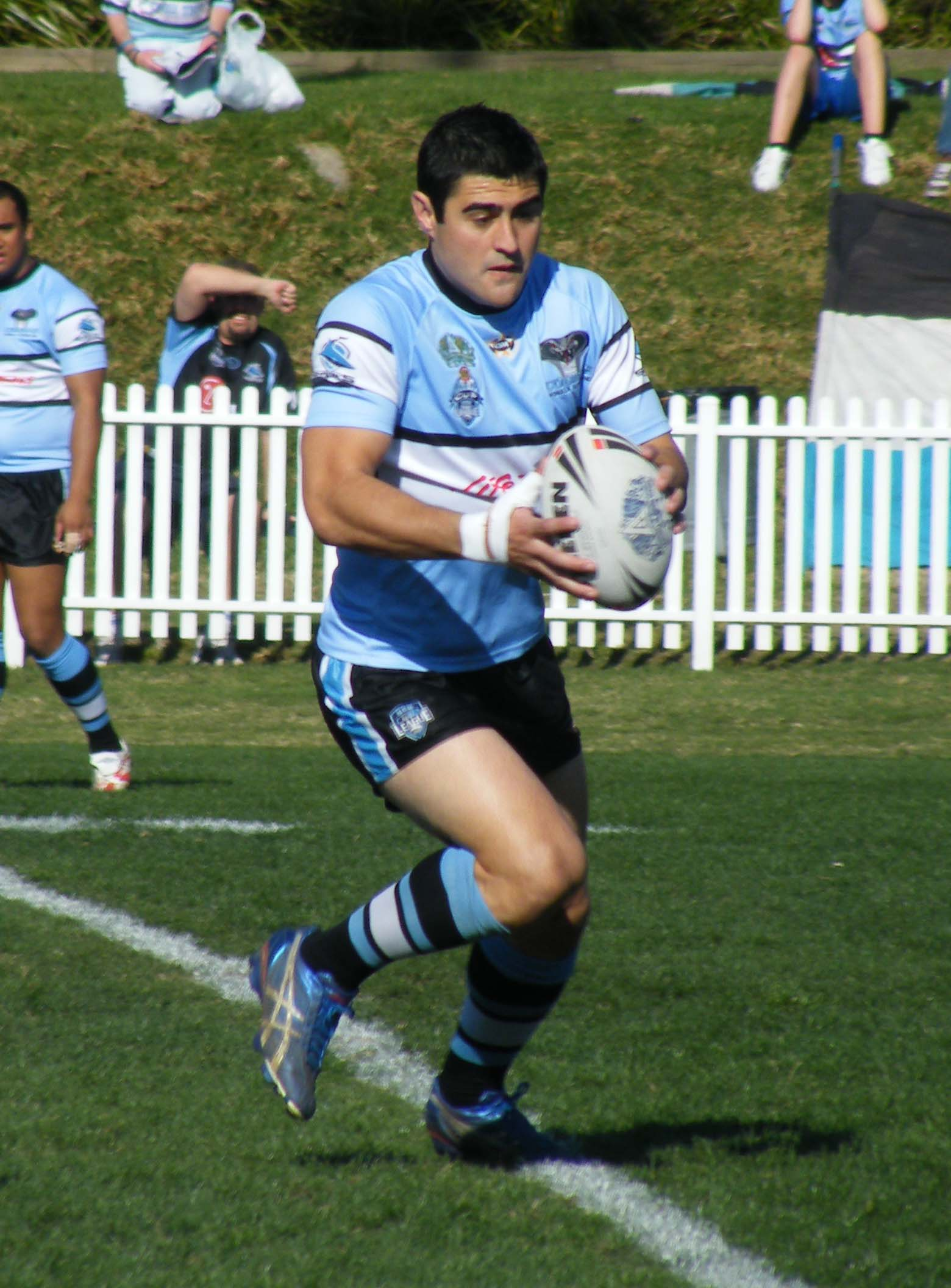
Goodwin playing for the Cronulla Sharks in 2008

He played nine games for Cronulla-Sutherland from 2007 to 2008, scoring two tries. In one of those tries, against the St. George Illawarra Dragons, he chased a Greg Bird grubber kick and kept the ball within millimetres of the dead ball line in the field of play and grounded it for a try which leveled the score and sent the game into golden point.

=== Canterbury-Bankstown Bulldogs (2009–2012) ===
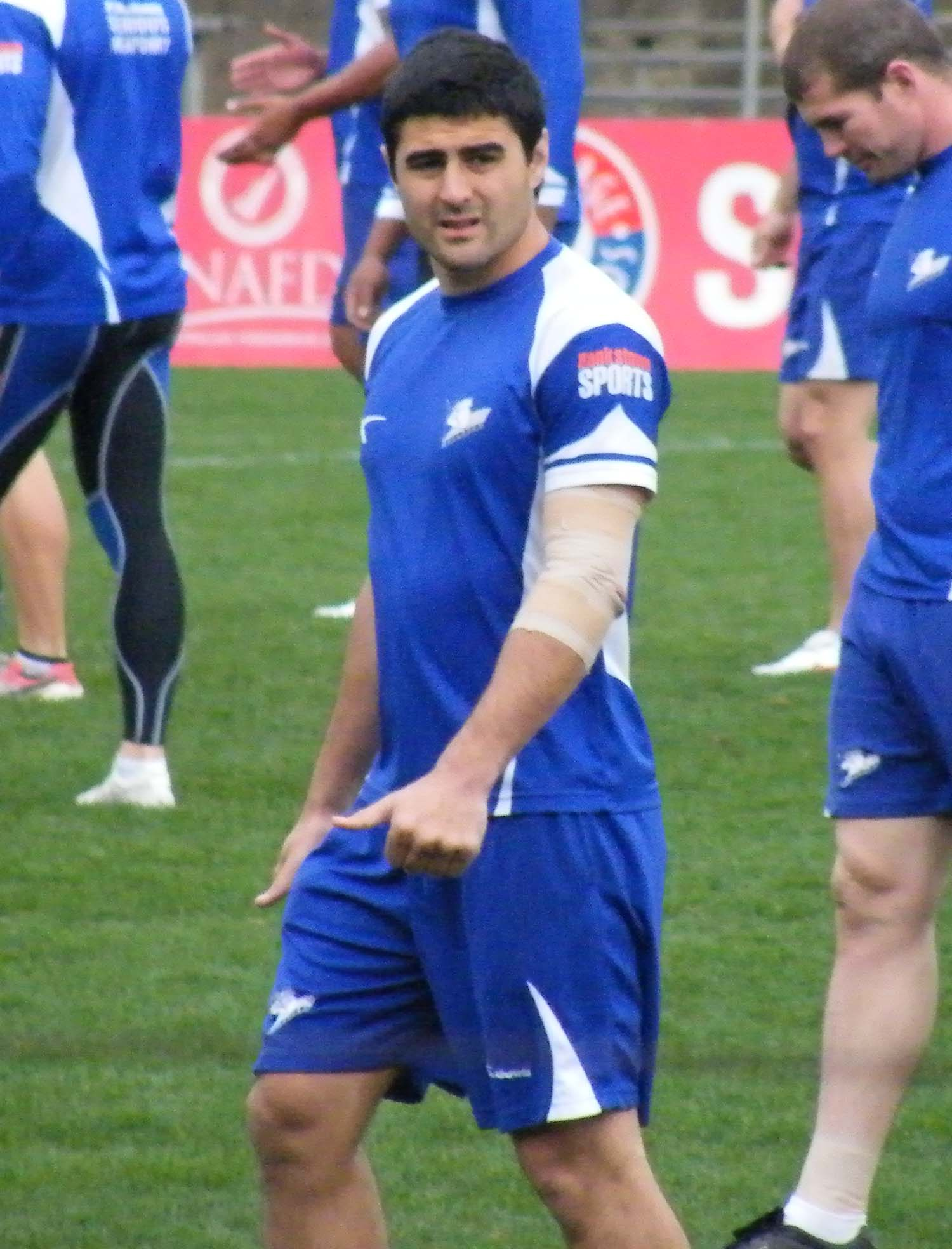
Goodwin training with the Bulldogs in 2009

Unwanted by Cronulla, Goodwin struggled to find a club before signing with Canterbury-Bankstown prior to the 2009 season. Goodwin made his debut for the Canterbury club in the first round of the 2009 season, scoring two tries in Canterbury's 34–12 win against Manly-Warringah Sea Eagles at ANZ Stadium. Goodwin scored his next try in the club's 20–12 loss to the Gold Coast Titans at Skilled Park. A week later, Goodwin again scored in the club's 24–12 victory against his former team Cronulla. Goodwin's try-scoring form continued when he scored right on full-time as the Canterbury club demolished Parramatta 48–18. The next round, Goodwin scored a try in his side's 30–20 victory over the Canberra Raiders in the nation's capital. He scored again the following round in Canterbury's 22-20 tight win over the Wests Tigers.

Goodwin scored his next try against the Melbourne Storm in the club's 26–10 win at Bluetongue Stadium. In round 14 against the Brisbane Broncos at Suncorp Stadium, Goodwin scored a brace of tries in the club's impressive 44–22 victory. Goodwin scored the following week in Canterbury's 19–12 win over the Penrith Panthers. The next week, he scored another two tries in Canterbury's 30–18 win over the Cowboys.

The following match, Goodwin was placed on report for a spear tackle, as Canterbury went down to Manly at Brookvale Oval, and was subsequently suspended for the next two matches.

In round 20, Goodwin returned and scored a try in Canterbury's 27–8 loss to Parramatta. He scored again the next week in the club's 26–18 victory over the South Sydney Rabbitohs. In Canterbury's round 22 match against Canberra, Goodwin scored his fourth double of the year, bringing his try-scoring tally to 18. In round 23, he scored in Canterbury's 22–12 victory over the Cowboys in Townsville.

Goodwin scored his final try of the season off a Hazem El Masri grubber kick in the preliminary final 22–12 loss to the Parramatta Eels in front of a record 74,549 crowd at ANZ Stadium. At the end of the 2009 season, Goodwin had scored a career best total of 20 tries, the fourth most in the competition, as the Canterbury club finished preliminary finalists. After an impressive season, Goodwin was selected in the New Zealand squad for the 2009 Four Nations.

After returning from England and France with the New Zealand test side, during the 2010 pre-season and following the retirement of Canterbury great Hazem El Masri, Goodwin was chosen to be Canterbury's new goal-kicker. Goodwin did not play in the Bulldogs first game of the 2010 season due to injury.

In Goodwin's first appearance for Canterbury in the new decade, he kicked his first goal for the club against the St. George Illawarra Dragons in round 2 at WIN Stadium in Wollongong. The next week, he scored six goals in Canterbury's 60–14 victory over the Sydney Roosters at ANZ Stadium. He scored his first try of the 2010 season and scored two goals in round 4 in Canterbury's 38–16 loss to the South Sydney Rabbitohs at ANZ Stadium. In round 7, Goodwin scored two tries and kicked six goals in Canterbury's 36–18 victory at ANZ Stadium against the Brisbane Broncos. Goodwin scored a try and booted six goals in Canterbury's 32–12 victory over the South Sydney Rabbitohs at ANZ Stadium.

In the 2010 season he ended up with a total of 6 tries and kicked 73 goals for 170 points and Canterbury finished in thirteenth place. In the opening game of the 2011 season, Goodwin scored four goals in Canterbury's 24–14 win over the Wests Tigers at ANZ Stadium. The next week against the South Sydney Rabbitohs at ANZ Stadium, Goodwin scored a try off a kick and scored four goals in the Bulldogs 28–19 victory. In Canterbury's 36–24 win over the South Sydney Rabbitohs in round 7 at ANZ Stadium, Goodwin got injured and was ruled out for several weeks. Goodwin returned in round 11 in Canterbury's 20–12 loss to the Canberra Raiders at Canberra Stadium.

In round 16 Goodwin was dropped for the first time since he joined the club. The last time Goodwin played in Reserve Grade was in 2008 while he was at the Cronulla-Sutherland Sharks.

Goodwin made his first ever appearance in Reserve Grade for Canterbury in round 16 in their 32–15 win against the North Sydney Bears at North Sydney Oval. In that game Goodwin scored his first ever Reserve Grade try for the club and kicked 4 goals. Goodwin played the rest of the 2011 season in Reserve Grade which included playing for Canterbury in their 30-28 NSW Cup Grand Final win over the Auckland Vulcans, where he kicked 3 goals which helped the Canterbury Reserve Grade side win their 3rd successive Reserve Grade premiership in a row. His 2011 first grade season total ended up scoring 1 try and kicked 24 goals for 52 points and Canterbury finished in ninth place, missing out on the finals on points differential.

Goodwin began the 2012 season in first grade under new Canterbury coach Des Hasler and scored his first try in the opening game in Canterbury's 22–14 victory over the Penrith Panthers at Penrith. His next try came the next week in Canterbury's 30–4 win over the St. George Illawarra Dragons at ANZ Stadium. His third try came in Canterbury's 46–12 win over rivals the Parramatta Eels at ANZ Stadium. His next and last first grade try for the club came in Canterbury's 12–10 loss to the Manly-Warringah Sea Eagles at ANZ Stadium. In round 11 in Canterbury's easy 26–6 victory over the Cronulla-Sutherland Sharks, Goodwin injured his spleen in a collision with Sharks fullback Matthew Wright. The injury was career threatening. That match proved to be Goodwin's last first grade game for the club. Goodwin was out of action for a number of months and finally returned, to play the rest of the 2012 season in Reserve Grade. Goodwin's last game for the club was in the NSW Cup preliminary final in Canterbury's 34–6 loss to the Newtown Jets at Leichhardt Oval, where he kicked his last goal for the club. His 1st grade 2012 season total ended up with him scoring 4 tries and kicked 14 goals for 44 points.

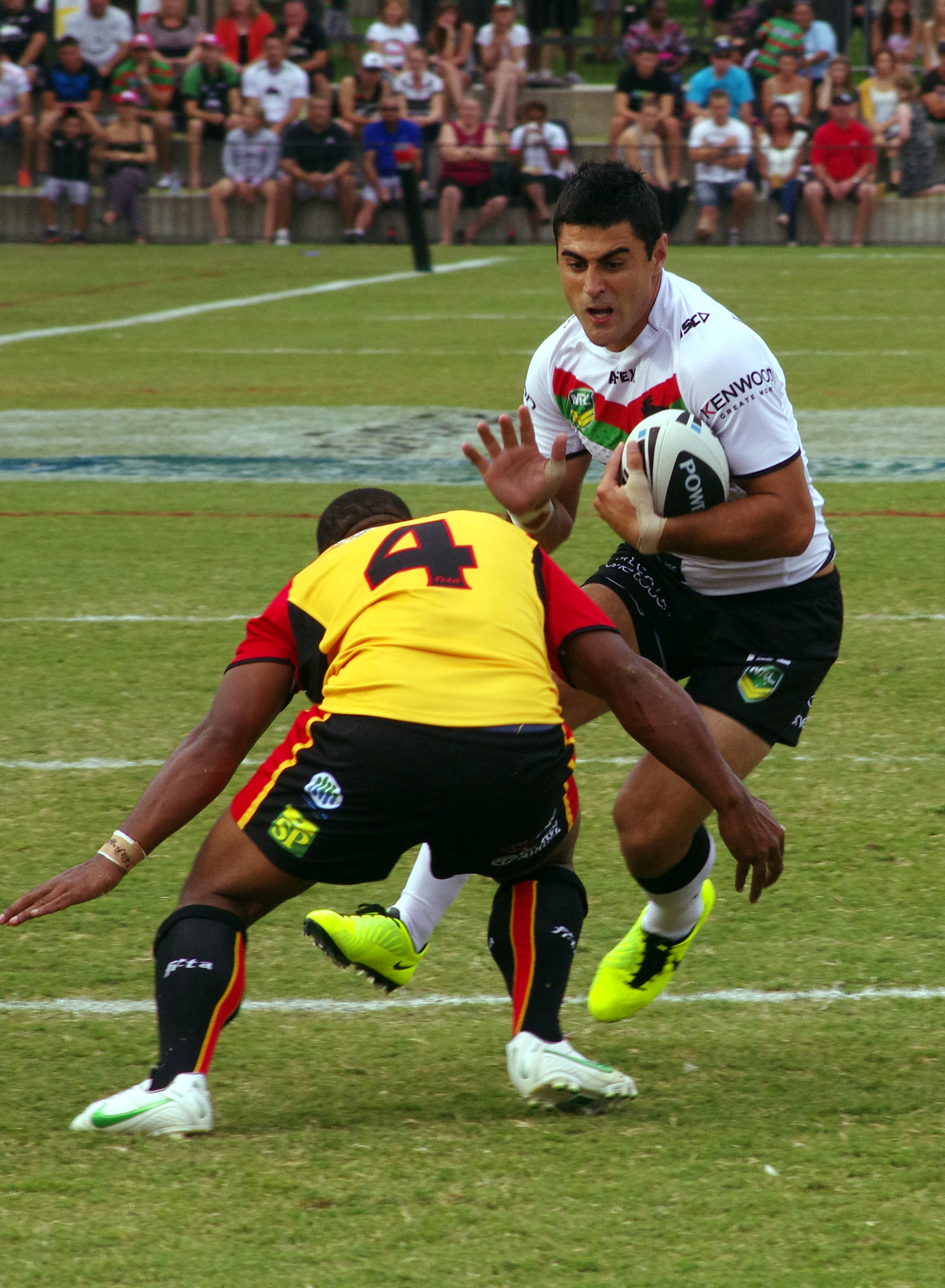
Goodwin playing for the Rabbitohs in 2013

=== South Sydney Rabbitohs (2013–2017) ===
After a four years with Canterbury-Bankstown, Goodwin signed a one-year deal with the South Sydney Rabbitohs. Goodwin mentioned on his signing to the Rabbitohs; "It is good to have it finally all sorted. It took a while, but I am excited to be going to such a good club". Souths coach Michael Maguire said of Goodwin; "Goodwin is a quality player with both first grade and international experience which will be invaluable for our backline. Unfortunately for him he had a season of injury in 2012 but he'll be joining our squad for pre-season preparations, giving him the best chance to make first grade. He's very professional in everything he does and we're looking forward to him bolstering our options in the backs."

Goodwin made his debut for South Sydney in round 2 in their 14–12 victory over the Cronulla-Sutherland Sharks at ANZ Stadium. The next week, Goodwin scored his first ever try for the club in South Sydney's 44–32 victory over the Penrith Panthers at Centrebet Stadium. The next week in round 4, Goodwin scored a try against his former club the Canterbury-Bankstown Bulldogs in South Sydney's 17–12 victory at ANZ Stadium. The next week, Goodwin scored his third try in 3 successive matches for Souths by scoring their third try in South Sydney's close 24–22 victory over the New Zealand Warriors at Mount Smart Stadium in Auckland, New Zealand which gave Souths four wins in their opening four matches. After a four match try drought, eventually in round 9, Goodwin scored a try in South Sydney's comfortable 28–10 victory over the North Queensland Cowboys at ANZ Stadium.

On 16 May 2013, Goodwin signed a two-year contract extension with Souths for a price tag believed to be worth around $60,000 a year which will keep him at the club till the summer of 2015. On 27 May, he scored his fifth try of the season in South Sydney's tight 14–12 loss to former club Cronulla-Sutherland Sharks at Shark Park.

Goodwin appeared in all 25 South's matches in season 2015, amassing a total of 2554 metres with the ball in hand on his way to scoring six tries. The Kiwi representative also made 308 tackles, seven line-breaks and 11 offloads.

On 6 October 2015, it was announced that Goodwin had re-signed with the club for a further two years.

On 9 October 2015, Goodwin was awarded the Roy Asotasi Members' Choice Award. Members regarded Goodwin as having been South Sydney's best throughout the 2015 season in an online poll that ran until late September.

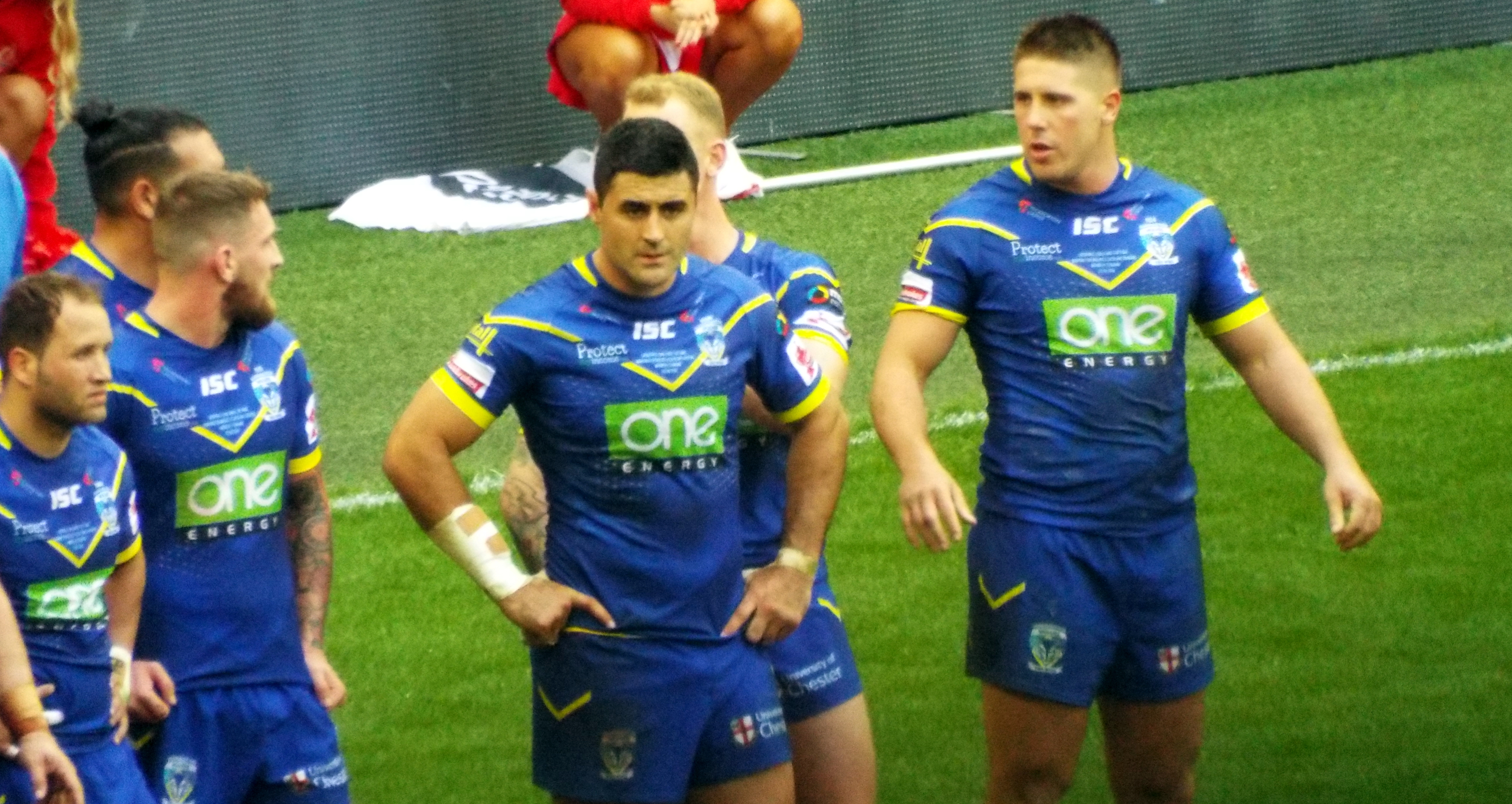
Goodwin (centre) playing for Warrington against Catalans at Wembley in 2018

=== Warrington Wolves (2018–2019) ===
Goodwin signed a deal to play for Leigh Centurions for the upcoming 2018 Super League season. However, on 2 October 2017, following Leigh's relegation to the Championship after losing the Million Pound Game, Leigh owner Derek Beaumont confirmed that Warrington Wolves had made an offer and that Leigh⁬ had accepted. He then joined Warrington for the 2018 Super League season.

He played in the 2018 Challenge Cup Final defeat by the Catalans Dragons at Wembley Stadium.

Goodwin played for Warrington in the club's 2018 Super League Grand Final defeat by the Wigan Warriors at Old Trafford. Warrington were looking to win their first premiership since 1955 but fell short for the second time in three years.

On 4 July 2019, Goodwin signed a contract to return to his former club South Sydney for the 2020 NRL season after spending only two years in England with Warrington.

He played in the 2019 Challenge Cup Final victory over St Helens at Wembley Stadium.

=== Return to South Sydney ===
On 15 June 2020, Goodwin signed a contract to join Cronulla without having played a game for South Sydney.

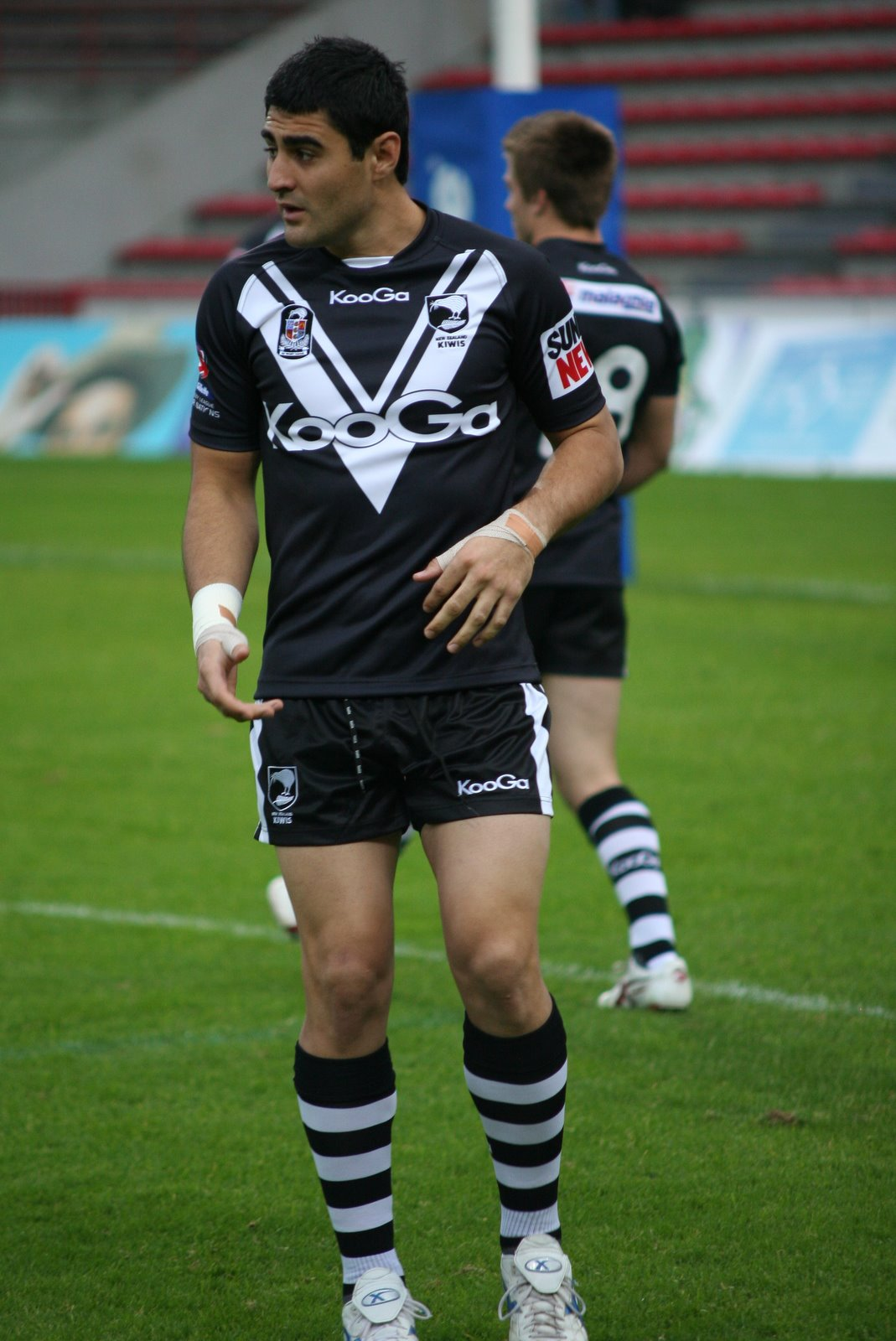
Goodwin playing for the Kiwis in 2009

=== Return to Cronulla–Sutherland (2020 and retirement) ===
In round 6 of the 2020 NRL season, Goodwin made his first start for Cronulla and scored the winning try as the club defeated Canterbury 20–18 at Bankwest Stadium.

== Representative career ==
=== New Zealand ===
Bryson being of half-New Zealander and half-Australian heritage, was eligible to represent both nations. At the end of his outstanding 2009 season with the Bulldogs, Goodwin pledged his allegiance to the New Zealand Kiwis national side through his New Zealander Māori descent on his father's side. He was picked to tour and play with the New Zealand side at the 2009 Four Nations tournament in England and France. Ten days before the New Zealanders headed over to Europe, Goodwin scored his first international cap when he made his Test debut for New Zealand and also scored his first two tries for New Zealand in the Kiwis 40–24 victory over Tonga in a Test Match at the Rotorua International Stadium. In New Zealand's opening round match at the Four Nations, Goodwin kicked his first two goals for New Zealand in their dramatic 20–20 draw with Australia at the Twickenham Stoop in London, England. In the next round, Goodwin scored his first try of the tournament and kicked nine goals in the Kiwis 62–12 victory over France at the Stade Ernest-Wallon in Toulouse, France. In the Kiwi's win over the French, Goodwin scored 22 points. In the third round, Goodwin scored a try and kicked two goals in New Zealand's 20–12 loss to co-hosts England at the Galpharm Stadium in Huddersfield, England. After this defeat New Zealand finished in 3rd place on the tournament ladder and were therefore knocked out of the tournament. At the end of the tournament, Goodwin's tournament tally was scoring 2 tries and kicking 13 goals for 32 points.

In 2013, he was recalled to the Kiwis squad for the 2013 Rugby League World Cup. He played in every game of the tournament, including New Zealand's 34–2 loss to Australia in the final.

=== Māori ===
Goodwin played in the 2020 All Stars match between the Indigenous All Stars and the Māori All Stars.
