= John Bailey (rugby league) =

Australian RL coach and former rugby league footballer

Personal information
- Full name: John Bailey
- Born: 1954 (age 71–72) Inverell, New South Wales, Australia

Playing information
- Height: 5 ft 7 in (170 cm)
- Weight: 12 st 0 lb (76 kg)
- Position: Five-eighth
Club
Years	Team	Pld	T	G	FG	P
1975–77	St. George	38	4	0	0	12

Coaching information
Club
Years	Team	Gms	W	D	L	W%
1976	St George	1	0	0	1	0
1988–90	Western Suburbs	51	15	2	34	29
	Total	52	15	2	35	29

John Bailey (born 1954) is an Australian former rugby league footballer who played in the 1970s.

== Playing career ==
Bailey came to St. George from Inverell, New South Wales, in 1973 and made first grade in 1975.

He was a member of the St. George team that won the Under 23s grand final in 1974 and made it into first grade the following year. He played in the devastating 1975 Grand Final loss to Eastern Suburbs but returned in 1977 to play in the 1977 Grand Final victory over Parramatta Eels, scoring a penalty try in the last minutes of the match.

== Coaching career ==
He retired after the grand final and went on to coach Western Suburbs between 1988 and 1990 after having coached the lower grades at the St. George Dragons. Bailey's time as Western Suburbs coach was not a successful one and the club finished last in 1988. Bailey's final two seasons at the club saw Wests finish 14th and 13th on the table.
