= Jim Porter =

Australia international rugby league footballer

Personal information
- Full name: James Andrew Porter
- Born: 3 March 1948 (age 78)

Playing information
- Position: Wing
Club
Years	Team	Pld	T	G	FG	P
1970–74	Eastern Suburbs	87	35	0	0	105
1975–77	Parramatta	67	35	0	0	105
	Total	154	70	0	0	210
Representative
Years	Team	Pld	T	G	FG	P
1975	Australia	2	0	0	0	0
1974	NSW City	1	0	0	0	0

Jim Porter (born 1949) is an Australian former rugby league footballer who played in the 1970s. An Australia national representative winger, he played his club football in the New South Wales Rugby Football League premiership with the Eastern Suburbs club (with whom he won the 1974 premiership) and Parramatta. With the Australian team he won the 1975 World Cup, and he also made an appearance for NSW City in 1974.

== Playing career ==
Porter started playing first grade in the NSWRFL for Easts in 1970. He played with them in the loss to Manly-Warringah in the 1972 Grand Final.

Porter played in the successful Roosters side in the 1974 NSWRFL season's Grand Final however, before moving to Parramatta the following season. In 1975 he played for the Australian side which won the World Cup on points standing at the end of the tournament.

The following year he scored a try in Parramatta's loss to Manly in the 1976 Grand Final. Then in 1977 Porter played in the drawn grand final against St. George as well as the re-match, which was also his last first grade game in the NSWRFL.
