= Steve Butler (disambiguation) =

Steve Butler (born 1956) was an auto racing driver.

Steve Butler may also refer to:

- Steve Butler (footballer) (born 1962), English footballer
- Steve Butler (mathematician) (born 1977), American mathematician
- Steve Butler (badminton), English badminton player

== See also ==
- Steven Butler (disambiguation)
