= Robert Stone (rugby league) =

Australian rugby league footballer

Personal information
- Full name: Robert Henry Stone
- Born: 27 February 1956 Sydney, New South Wales, Australia
- Died: 1 August 2005 (aged 49)

Playing information
- Height: 5 ft 10 in (1.78 m)
- Weight: 14 st 0 lb (89 kg)
- Position: Second-row, Prop
Club
Years	Team	Pld	T	G	FG	P
1975–85	St George Dragons	170	26	0	0	81
Representative
Years	Team	Pld	T	G	FG	P
1980	New South Wales	2	0	0	0	0
- Source: Whiticker/Hudson

Robert Henry Stone (27 February 1956 - 1 August 2005) was an Australian professional rugby league footballer and official. He played 281 games for the St. George Dragons including 170 games in first grade mainly at prop. Stone achieved representative honours including being a member of the first New South Wales State of Origin team. Stone later became the executive officer at St. George where his most notable achievement was having St George Illawarra Dragons return to Oki Jubilee Stadium in Kogarah from 2003.

== Playing history ==
Robert Stone played rugby union as a youngster and then switched to league as a teenager. He also completed training as a teacher.

Stone rose up through the grades at St. George, playing in the premiership winning Under-23s side in 1974, his first year as a graded player. He made his debut in first grade in 1975 NSWRFL season and played in the losing grand final to Eastern Suburbs in that year. Stone was also a member of the St. George side that won the Reserve Grade premiership in 1976.

Stone was a member of the 1977 St. George team that won the Premiership under coach Harry Bath. He played Second-row in the grand final which was drawn 9-all with Parramatta - the first draw in the history of Sydney rugby league. Stone scored the first try in the replay a week later which St. George won 22–0. In 1977, Stone won representative honours for the first time playing for City in City v Country.

St George won another premiership in 1979 defeating Canterbury-Bankstown, and Stone was a reserve for the match. However, in 1980, Stone represented NSW including in the first State of Origin match. NSW won the series but Queensland won the State of Origin match 20-10 as Queenslanders playing in the Sydney competition returned to play for their home state.

In 1984, Stone was captain of the St. George side for 15 out of the 24 matches played by the team. However, Stone was dropped to reserve grade for the 1985 grand final when St. George had teams playing in all three grades. Coach Roy Masters says that Stone was dropped for the game by a 3–2 vote. St. George lost first grade but won the reserve grade and third grade grand finals.

Stone did not play first grade in 1986 which was a disappointing year for the Dragons in their new home at the Sydney Cricket Ground. He was extremely disappointed at the decision by the St. George board to not offer him a new contract as he had reached 281 games for the club, making him third in the list of longest serving Dragons players behind Billy Smith and Norm Provan.

He was awarded Life Membership of the St. George Dragons in 1984.

== Later career ==
Stone was so upset at the failure to renew his contract and the move to the SCG that he stood against St. George President Danny Robinson, losing by one vote. He played for Picton Rugby League Club in Country League as captain-coach and coached the Western Suburbs Magpies reserve grade side.

He was a primary school teacher for many years at Bald Face Public School in the Sydney suburb of Blakehurst, New South Wales and at Marton Public School in Engadine, New South Wales.

In 2000, the St. George Committee including Robinson asked him to return to St. George as the Chief Executive to protect the proud history of the club in the joint venture with the Illawarra Steelers. Stone played a critical role in organising the return of St. George Illawarra to OKI Jubilee Oval in Kogarah in 2003 including organising the rejuvenation of the ground. The area where former great players of the Dragons congregate to watch the match is known as "Stoney's slab" as recognition of his role in redeveloping the ground.

Robert Stone was also involved in the decision by the Australian Labor Party to select Mark Latham as its new leader in 2003. Robert McClelland was a crucial vote in the battle between Latham and Kim Beazley. On 3 December, Latham suggested that McClelland call Stone who was his childhood friend and who Latham knew casually as a St. George fan. McClelland called Stone who advised him to vote for Latham as "Putting Beazley back in again would be like putting me into a first-grade team again. I'd be massacred.You have to move on and try something different." Robert McClelland voted for Latham with Stone's advice being one of the critical factors in his decision which led to Latham being elected voter by one vote.

== Death ==
Robert Stone was diagnosed with a brain tumor and fell into a coma in late July 2005. He died from the tumor on 1 August aged 49.

His funeral was held at St. John Bosco Church in Engadine, New South Wales, and reports described the funeral as being widely attended by many notable Rugby League identities including most of his teammates from the 1977 and 1979 grand final winning teams, the current 2005 St. George Illawarra full first grade team including coach Nathan Brown, Trent Barrett, Matt Cooper, Mark Gasnier, Dean Young, his ex coach Harry Bath, Ian Walsh, Steve Rogers, Johnny Raper, Billy Smith, Roy Masters, Craig Young, Ted Goodwin, Steve Edge, Steve Morris, Rod Reddy, Graeme Wynn, Mark Shulman, Ricky Walford, George Grant, Harry Eden, the entire St. George-Illawarra Club committee, other former opposition players including Tom Raudonikis, Laurie Daley, Graham Eadie, Steve Mortimer, John Peard, ex referees Mick Stone, Greg McCallum and Graham Annesley, NRL executives including CEO David Gallop, and many many more. Stone's old high school, Kogarah Marist Brothers, sent students to form a guard of honor. He was cremated at Woronora Crematorium, and the Wake was held later at St. George Leagues Club.

Club legend, Johnny Raper quoted in the media that "Only Clive Churchill's funeral was bigger than Stoney's". He was survived by his wife and three children.

== Career highlights ==
- Games: 281 games 170 first grade (3rd in list of St. George games played)
- Premierships: 1977 (first grade) 1976 (reserve grade) 1974 (under-23s)
- Representative Honours: 1980 (NSW) 1977 (City)
- Tries: 26

== Sources ==
- Australian Associated Press (1 August 2005). "Dragons legend passes away". Fox Sports.
- Masters, Roy (2 August 2005). "Dragons in depths of grief as Robert Stone - very reluctantly - loses cancer fight". The Sydney Morning Herald.
- Masters, Roy (6 August 2005). "Worth remembering: when an ethos of love over money was set in stone". The Sydney Morning Herald.
- "Dragons Mourn Loss of Club Legend Robert Stone" (Press release). St. George Dragons. 8 August 2005. Archived from the original on 27 September 2011.
