= Graham Quinn (rugby league) =

Australia international rugby league footballer

Personal information
- Born: 13 December 1957 (age 67); Brisbane, Queensland, Australia

Playing information
- Position: Centre
Club
Years	Team	Pld	T	G	FG	P
197?–7?	Brothers (Brisbane)
1977–83	St George	127	28	0	0	84
1985	Cronulla-Sutherland	10	1	0	0	4
	Total	137	29	0	0	88
Representative
Years	Team	Pld	T	G	FG	P
1980	Australia	1	0	0	0	0
1976–82	Queensland	5	0	0	0	0
1980	New South Wales	1	0	0	0	0

Graham Quinn (born 13 December 1957) is an Australian former rugby league footballer who played in the 1970s and 1980s primarily in Sydney's NSWRFL competition. He won premierships with the St George Dragons and represented at both state and national levels.

== Club career ==
Quinn attended Iona College, Brisbane, he was Queenslander junior and played his first senior rugby league with Brisbane Brothers. He signed as a centre with the St George Dragons in 1977 and was a member of the 'Bath's Babes' side who won the premiership that year. He played in both the historic 1977 Grand Final draw and replay against Parramatta. Two years later Quinn played in the Dragons' triumph over Canterbury in the 1979 Grand Final.

Leaving St George in 1983 after seven seasons, Quinn returned to Brisbane in 1984 but then ventured back to Sydney the following year for a final season with Cronulla.

== Representative career ==
In 1980 he was selected in the Australian national side to tour New Zealand and made his sole Test appearance in Australia's 15–6 win in Auckland which wrapped up the two-Test series. Although selected for Queensland, Quinn was unavailable for the inaugural State of Origin match in 1980 because of injury and had to wait a further two years to play for the Maroons.
