= 1977 NSWRFL season =

Rugby league competition

1977 New South Wales Rugby Football League
- Duration: March 19 – September 24, 1977
- Teams: 12
- Premiers: St. George (14th title)
- Minor premiers: Parramatta (1st title)
- Matches played: 139
- Points scored: 4346
- Total attendance: 1,440,765
- Top points scorer: Mick Cronin (225)
- Wooden spoon: Newtown Jets (7th spoon)
- Rothmans Medal: Mick Cronin
- Top try-scorer: Russel Gartner (17)

The 1977 NSWRFL season was the 70th season of Sydney's professional rugby league football competition, the New South Wales Rugby Football League premiership. Twelve clubs, including six of 1908's foundation teams and another six from around Sydney competed for the J. J. Giltinan Shield and WD & HO Wills Cup during the season, which culminated in a grand final between the St. George and Parramatta clubs. NSWRFL teams also competed for the 1977 Amco Cup.

== Season summary ==
During the pre-season Parramatta forward Graham Olling made headlines when he became the first rugby league player to admit to taking anabolic steroids, which at the time were not illegal in the sport.

Another stir was created at the start of the season by Newtown's recruitment of professional American football player, Manfred Moore. The club's first match of the season at Henson Park attracted the likes of Paul Hogan, Jeannie Little and John Laws who witnessed the American score Newtown's first try.

Twenty-two regular season rounds were played from March till August, with Parramatta top of the table for much of the season before finishing the home and away fixtures on top of the table. The final five were rounded out by St. George, Eastern Suburbs, Balmain and Manly. Cronulla-Sutherland had been in contention for a finals spot before fading late in the season.

The 1977 season's Rothmans Medal, as well as Rugby League Week's player of the year award, was awarded to Parramatta centre Mick Cronin.

=== Teams ===
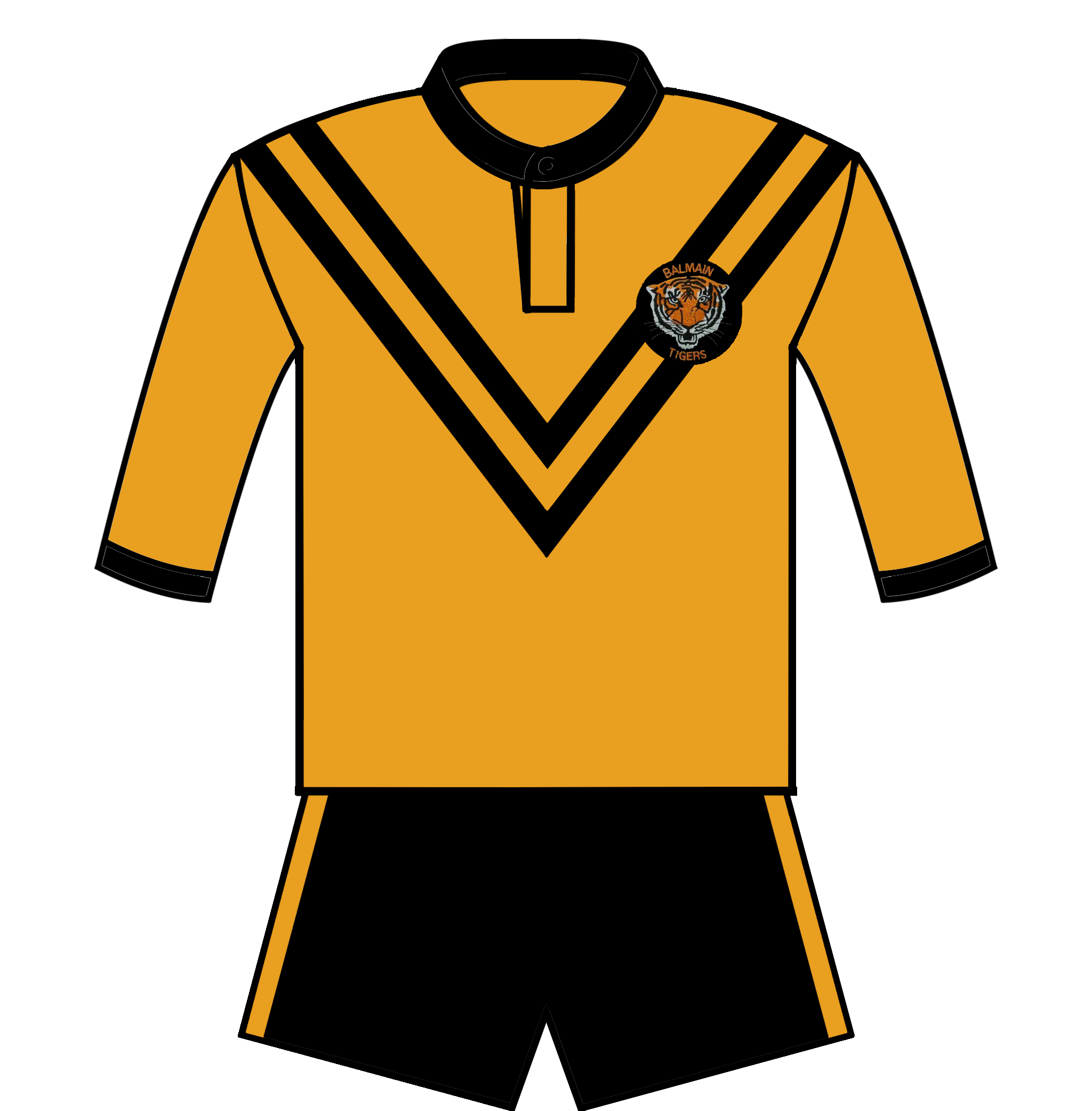
Balmain; Tigers 70th season Ground: Leichhardt Oval; Coach: Ron Willey; Captain: Trevor Ryan

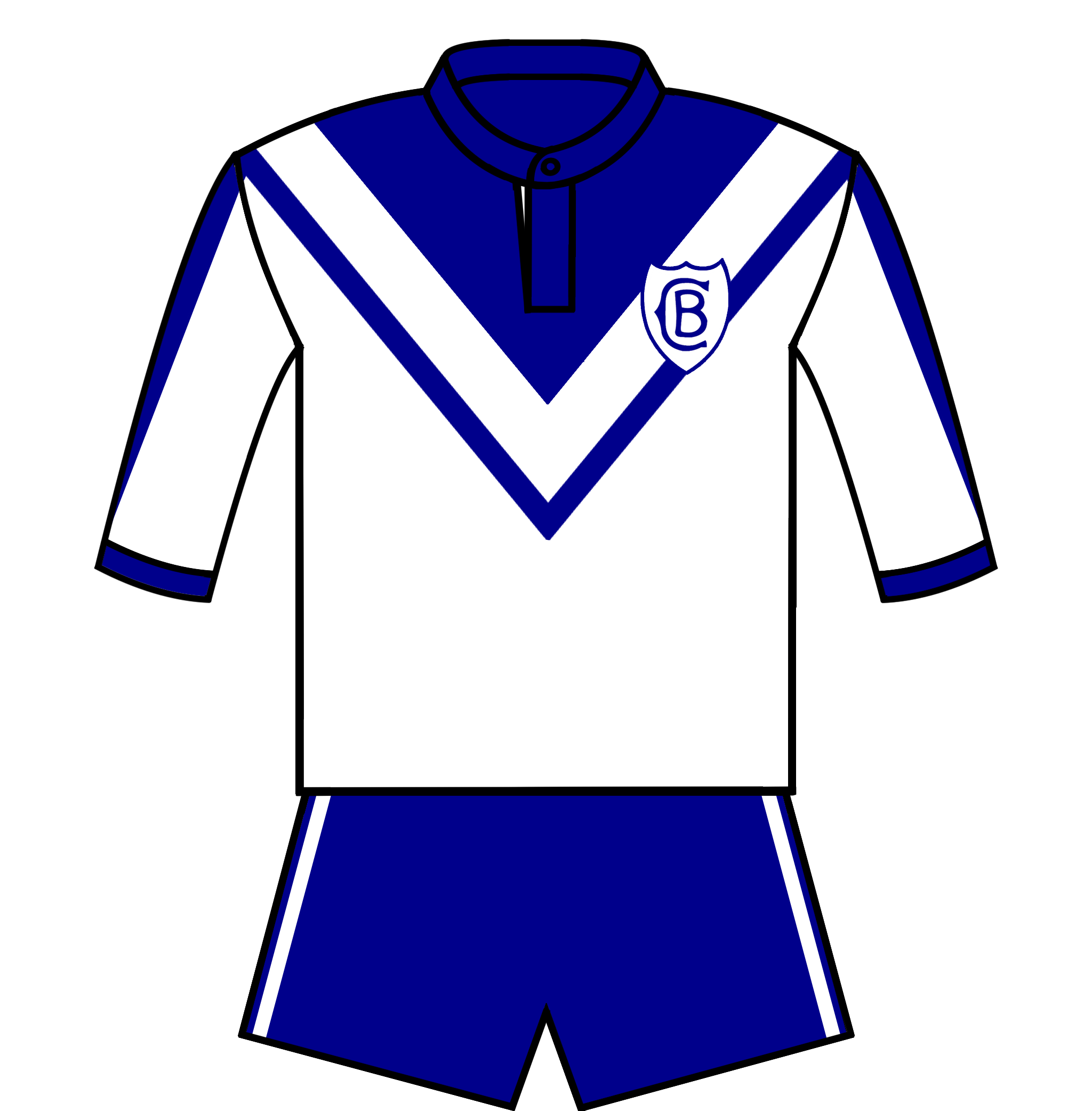
Canterbury-Bankstown 43rd season Ground: Belmore Sports Ground; Coach: Mal Clift; Captain: Bob McCarthy, George Peponis, Tim Pickup

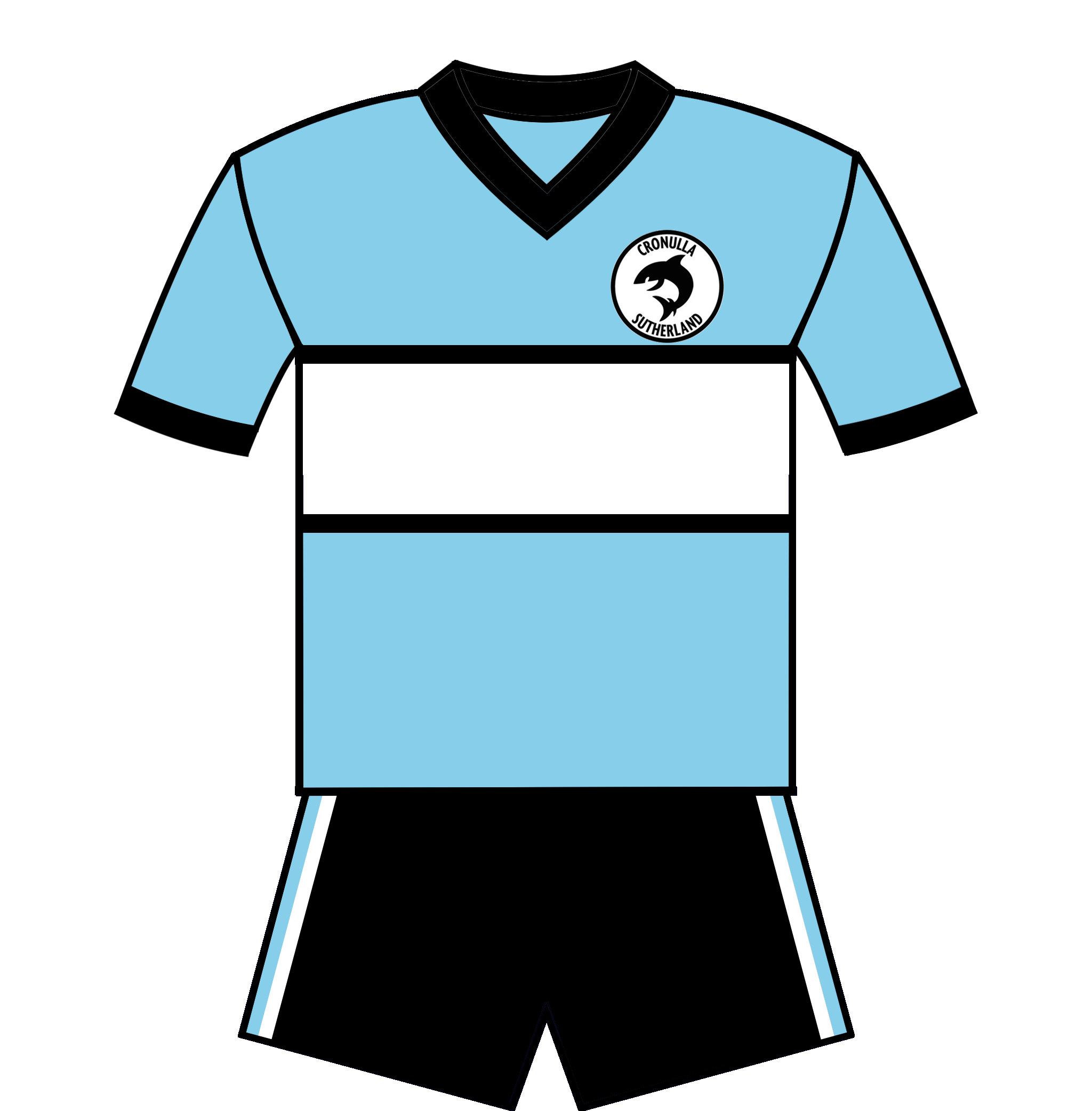
Cronulla-Sutherland; Sharks 11th season Ground: Endeavour Field; Coach: Ted Glossop; Captain: Greg Pierce

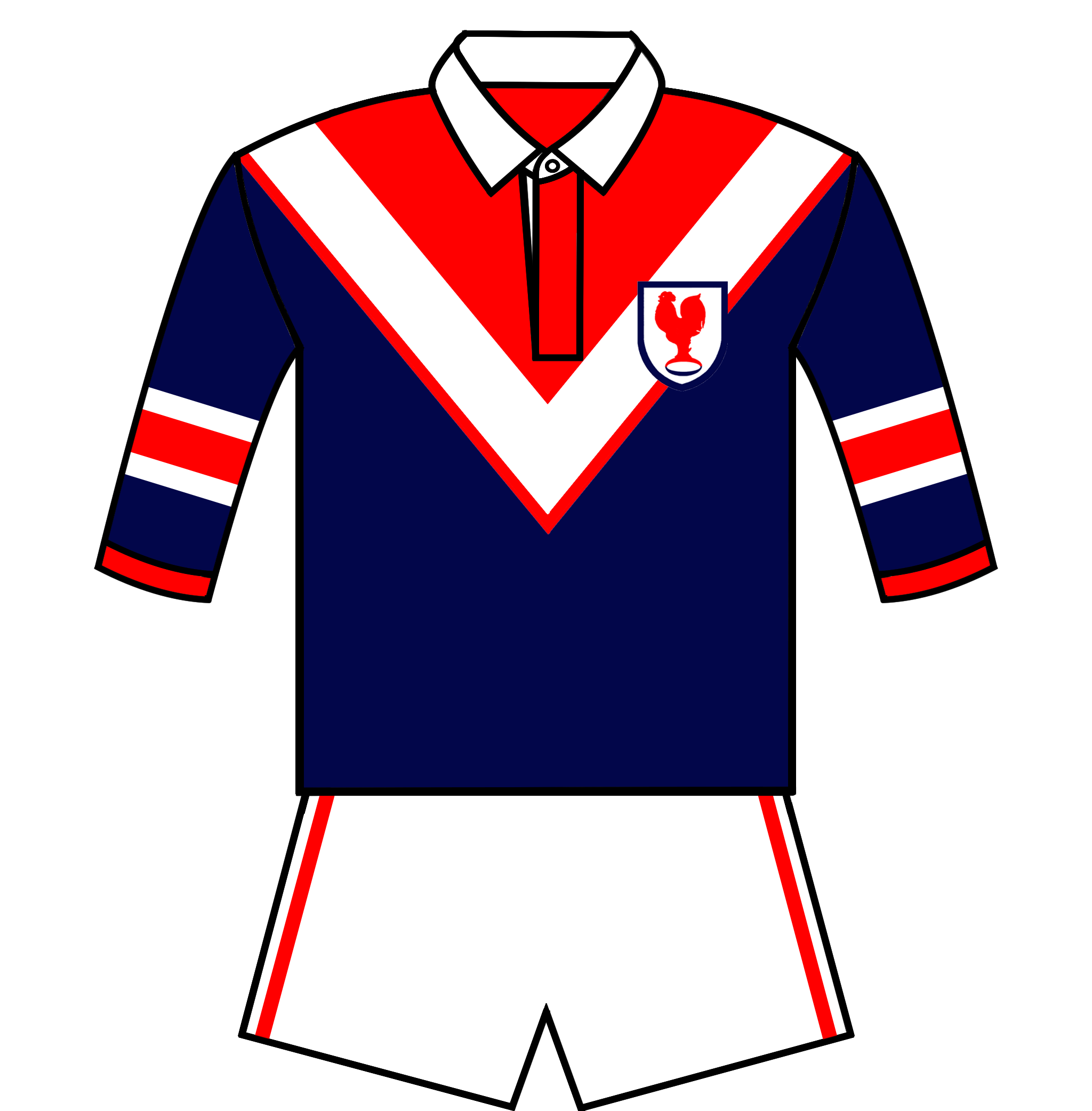
Eastern Suburbs; Roosters 70th season Ground: Sydney Sports Ground; Captain-coach: Arthur Beetson

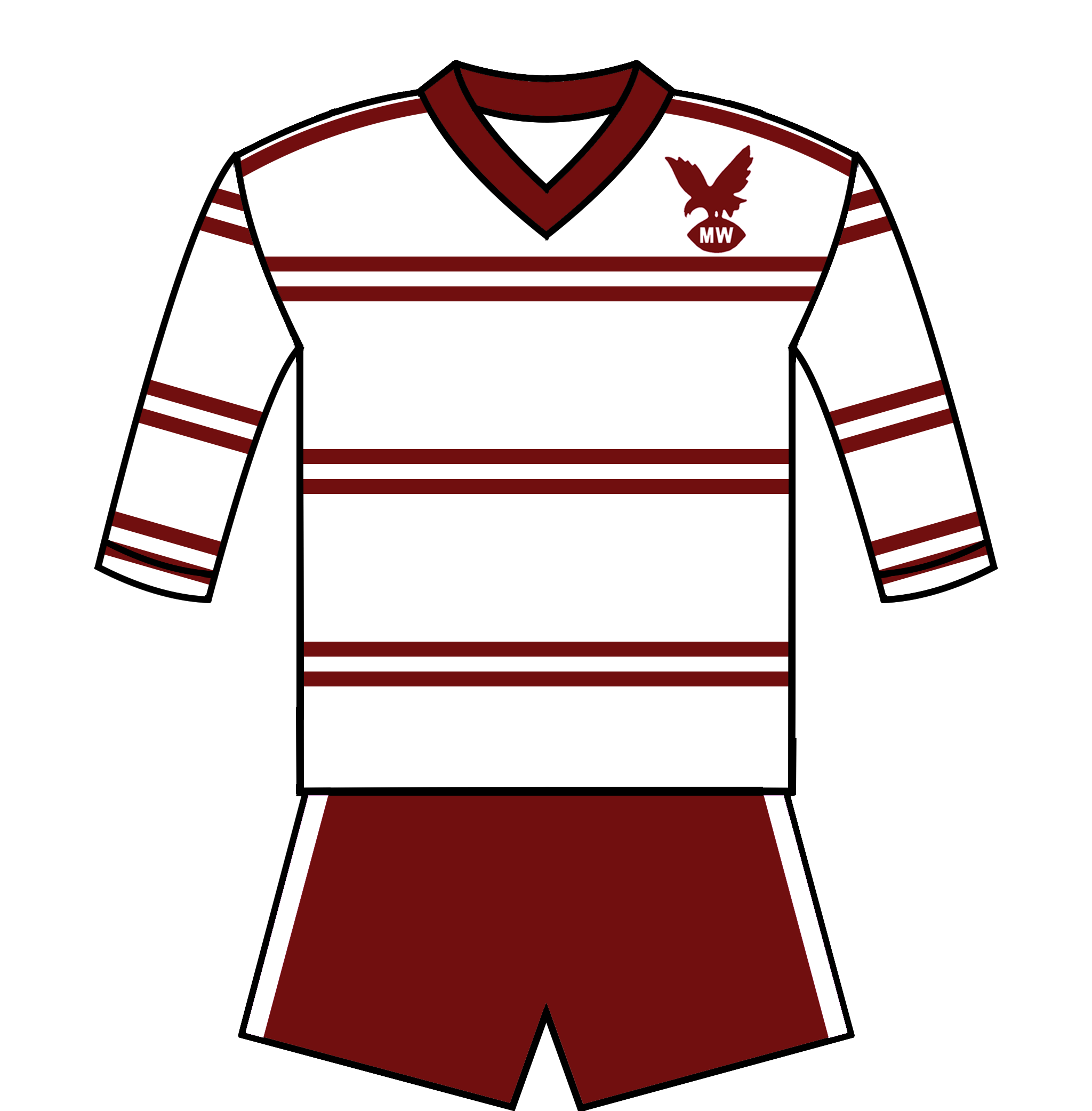
Manly-Warringah; Sea Eagles 31st season Ground: Brookvale Oval; Coach: Frank Stanton; Captain: Ray Branighan

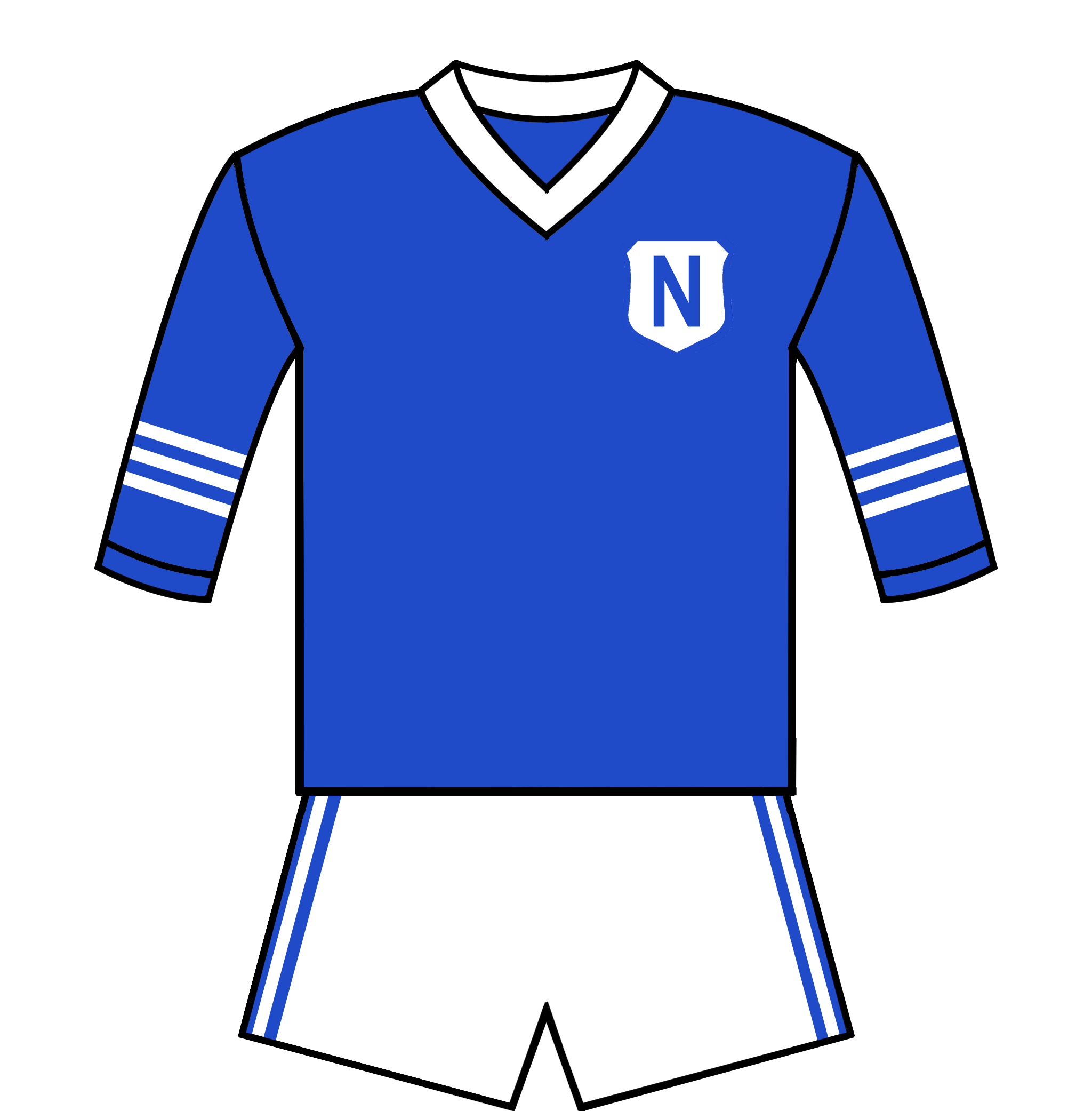
Newtown; Jets 70th season Ground: Henson Park; Coach: Paul Broughton; Captain: John Floyd

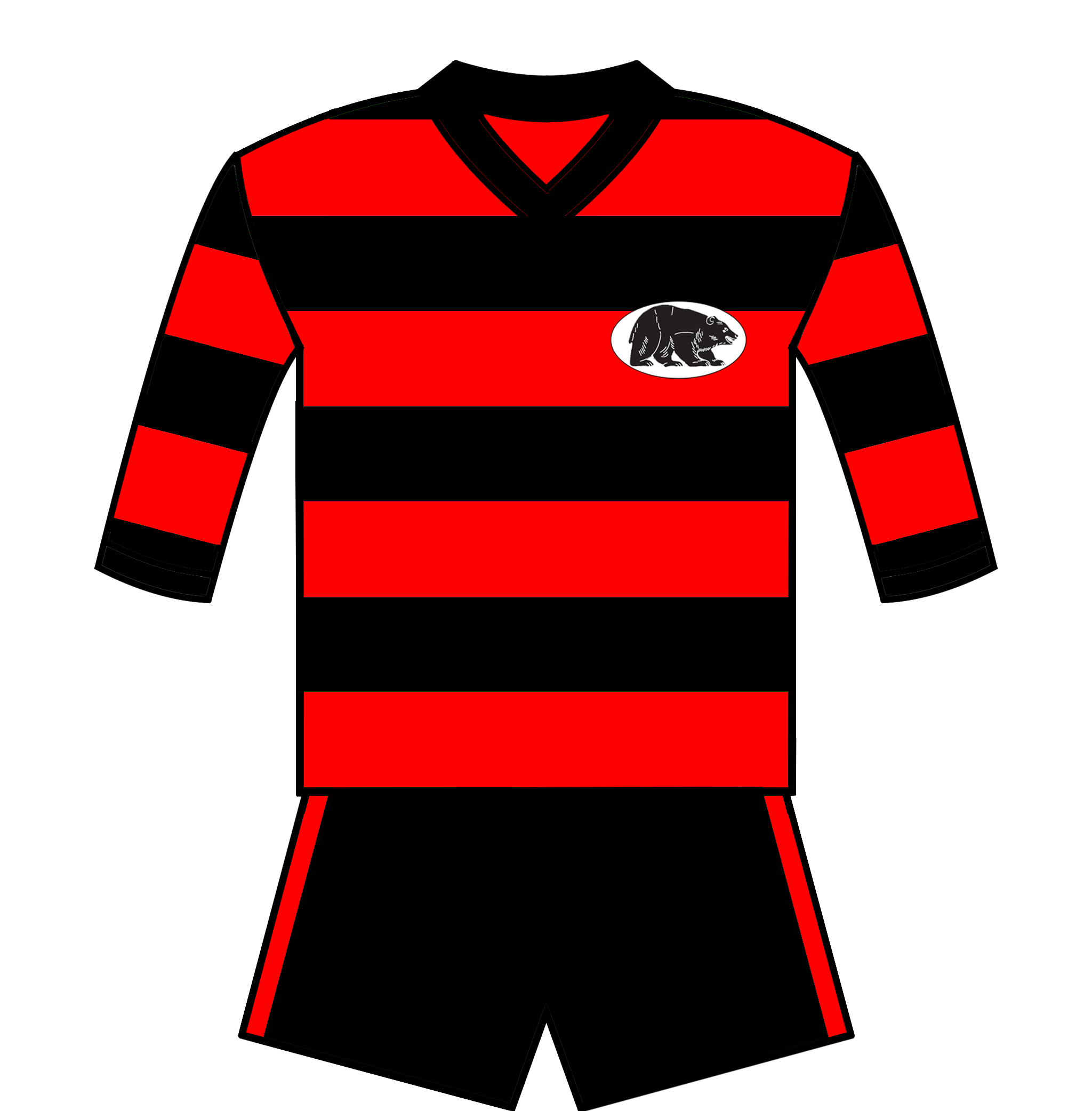
North Sydney; Bears 70th season Ground: North Sydney Oval; Captain-coach: Bill Hamilton

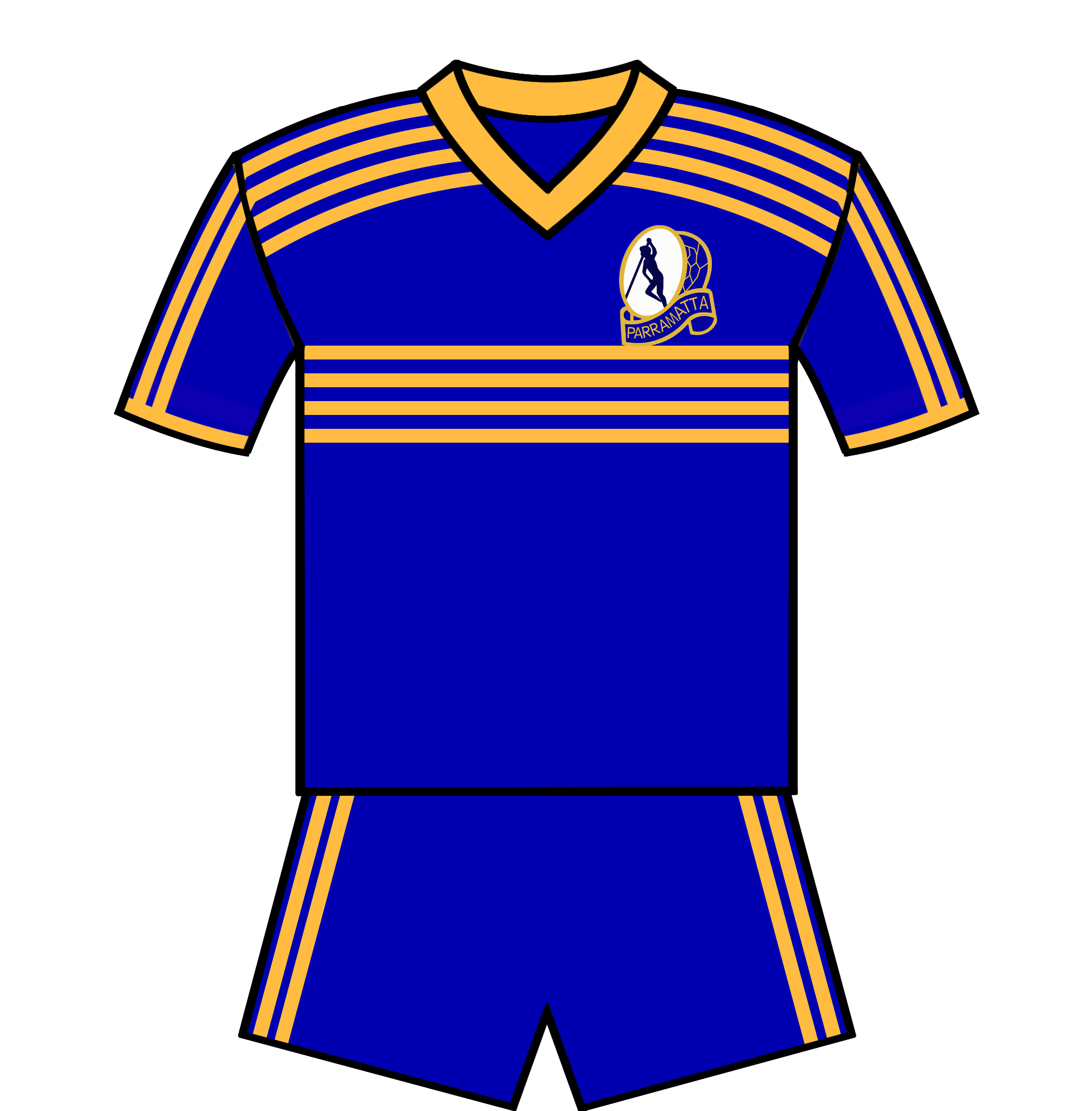
Parramatta; Eels 31st season Ground: Cumberland Oval; Coach: Terry Fearnley; Captain: Ray Higgs

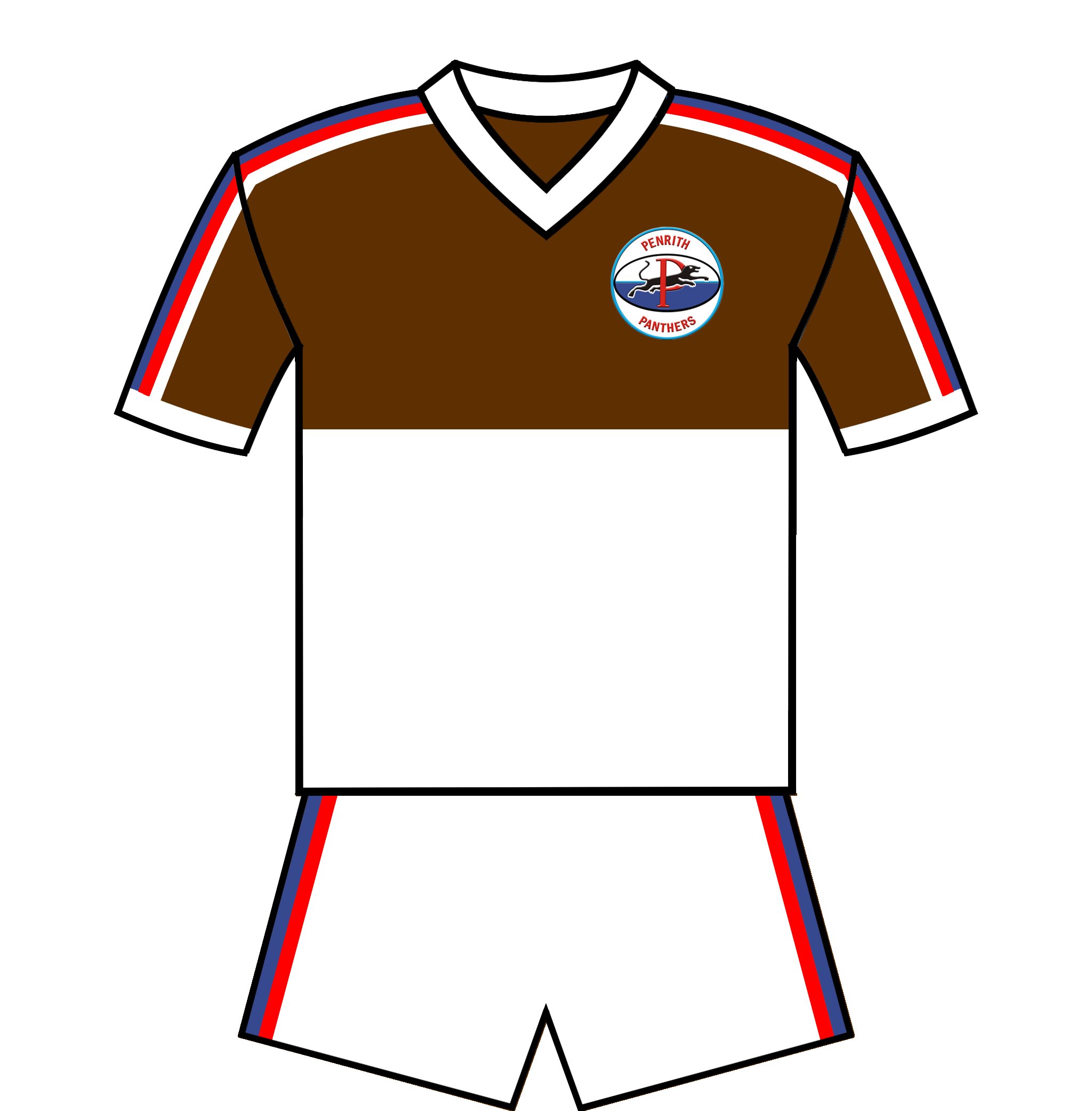
Penrith; Panthers 11th season Ground: Penrith Park; Coach: Don Parish; Captain: Mike Stephenson

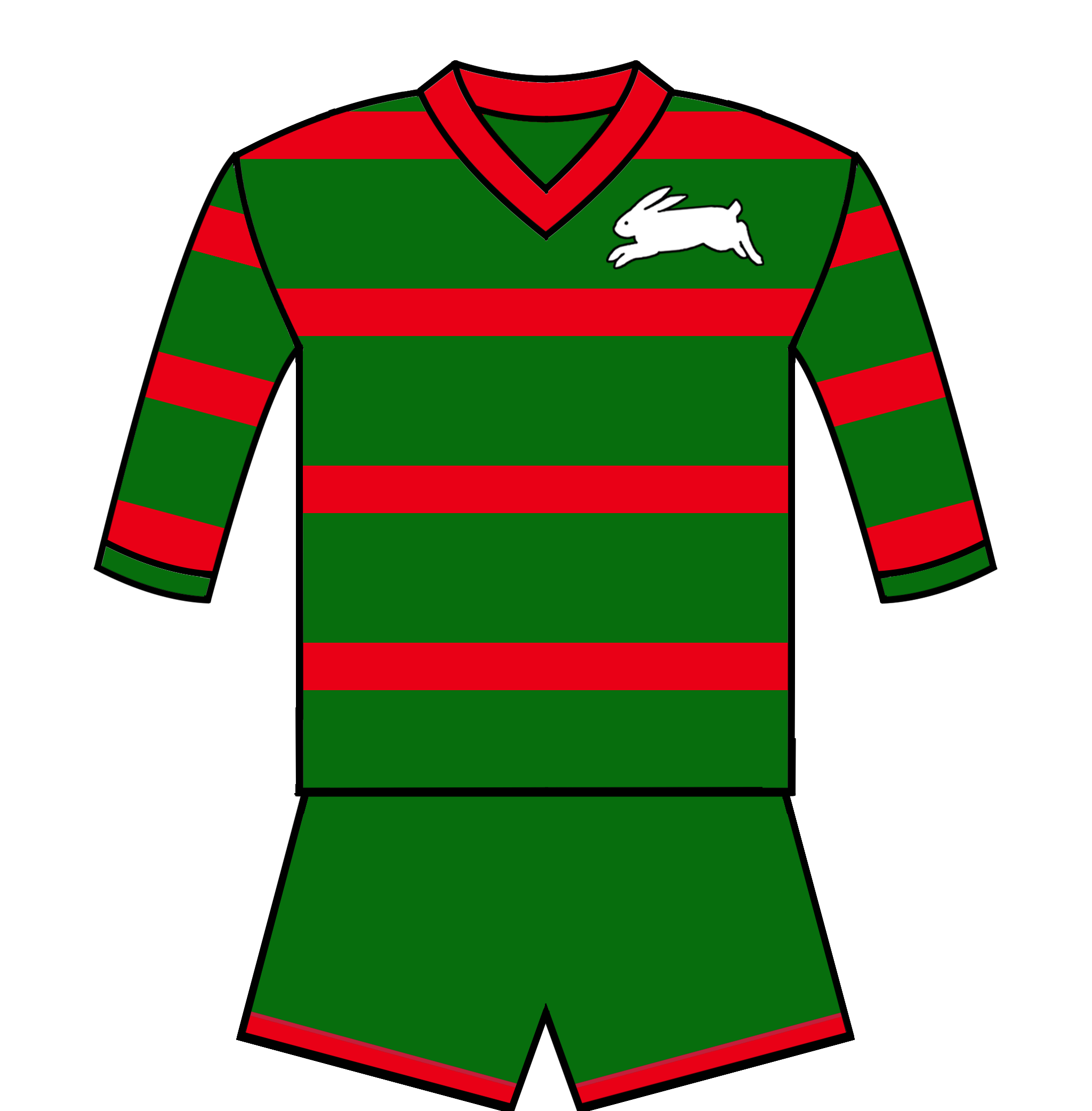
South Sydney; Rabbitohs 70th season Ground: Redfern Oval; Coach: John O'Neill; Captain: George Piggins

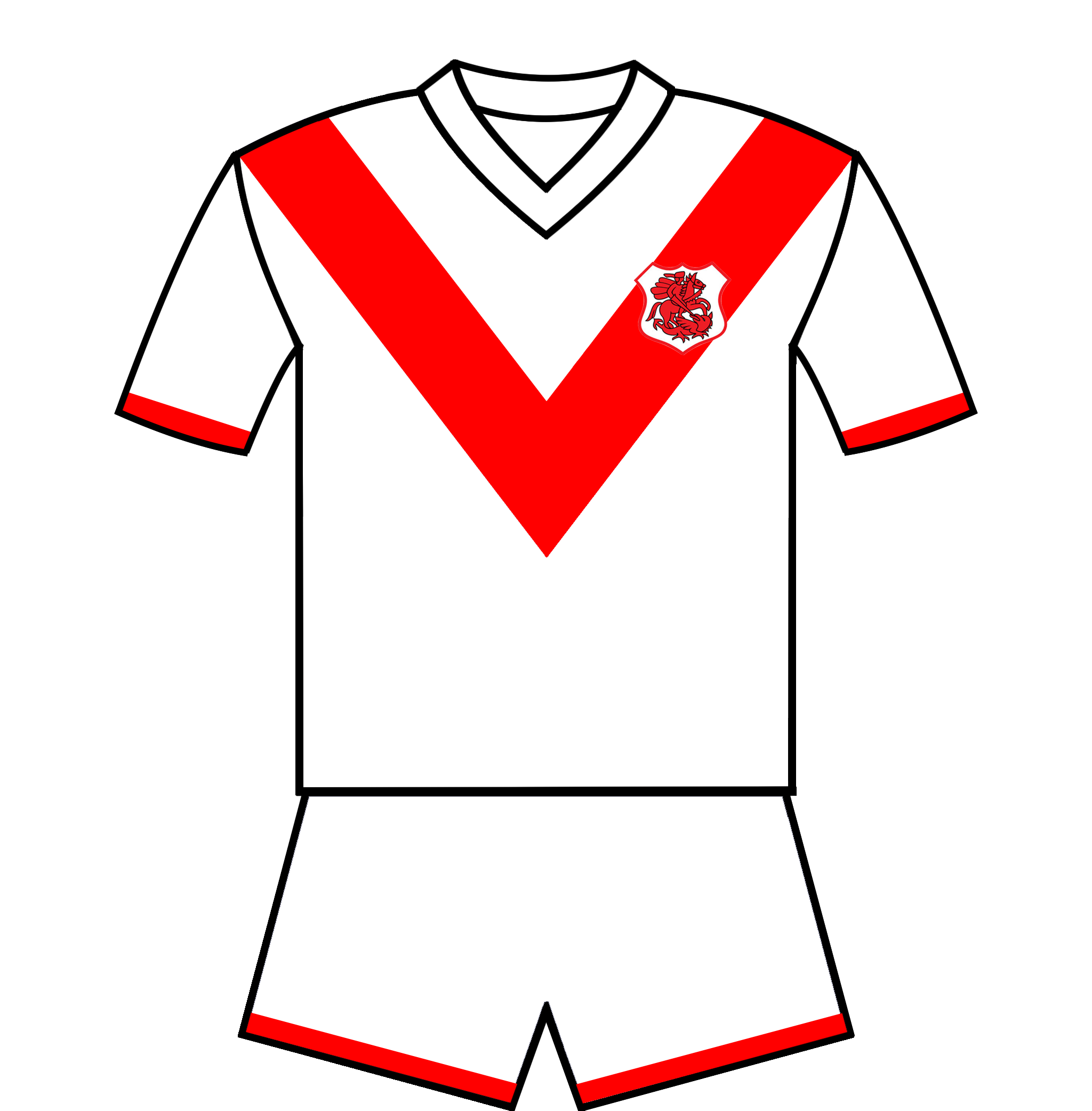
St. George; Dragons 57th season Ground: Kogarah Oval; Coach: Harry Bath; Captain: Steve Edge

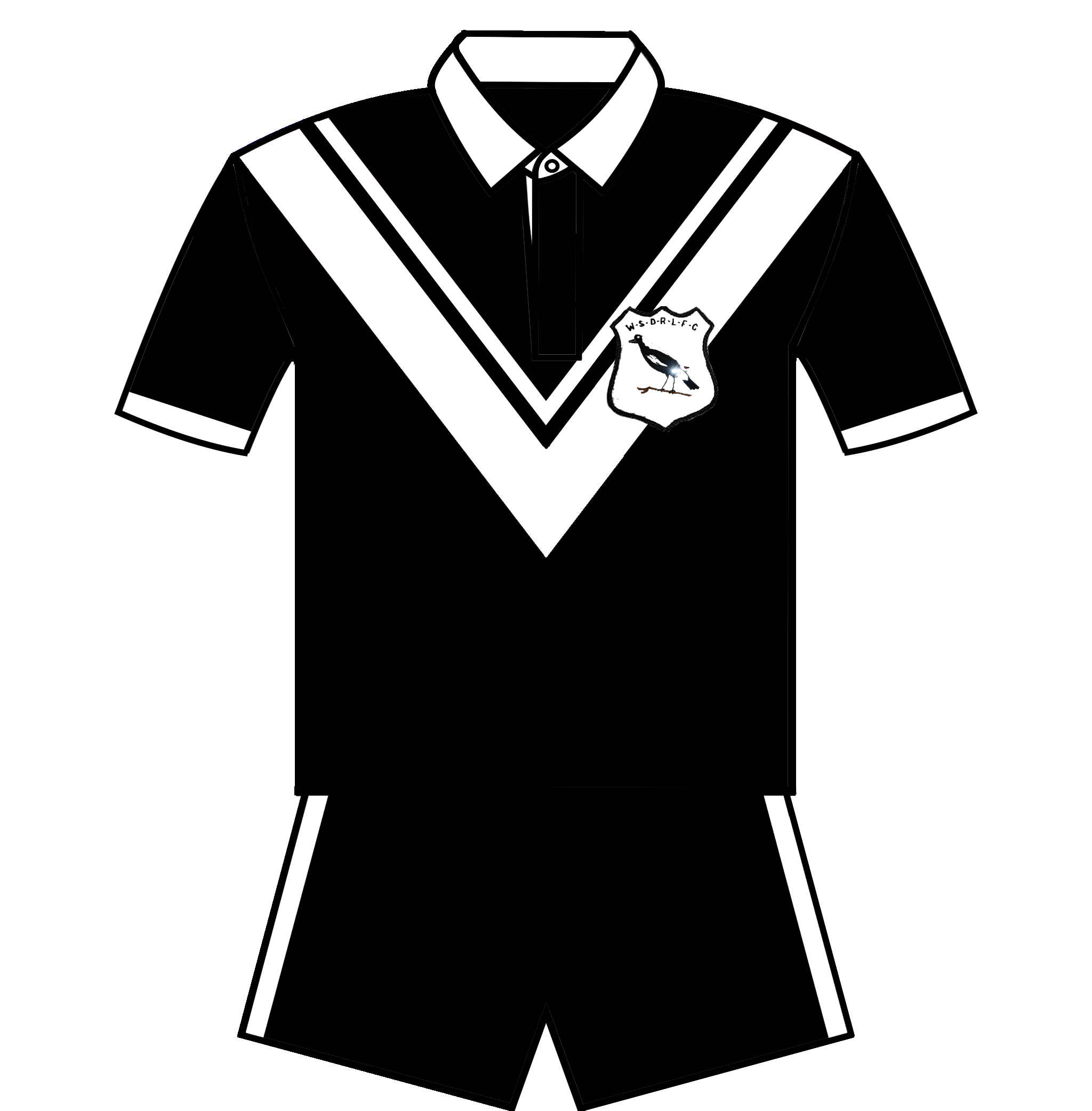
Western Suburbs; Magpies 70th season Ground: Lidcombe Oval; Coach: Keith Holman; Captain: Tom Raudonikis

== Regular season ==
Team	1	2	3	4	5	6	7	8	9	10	11	12	13	14	15	16	17	18	19	20	21	22	F1	F2	F3	GF	GFR
Balmain Tigers	**EAS** **+4**	SOU −2	CRO +10	**WES** **+11**	**NOR** **+19**	**PEN**; **0**	**STG** **−9**	PAR −2	**CBY** **+7**	MAN +16	EAS; 0	**SOU** **+4**	**CRO** **−8**	**NEW** **+17**	WES +26	NOR +9	**PEN** **+10**	STG −4	**PAR** **−20**	NEW +31	CBY +17	**MAN** **−7**	**MAN** **+8**	EAS −24			
Canterbury-Bankstown	**CRO** **−2**	NOR; 0	STG +10	**NEW** **+18**	MAN +1	SOU +1	**WES** **−3**	**PEN** **+11**	BAL −7	EAS −7	CRO +23	**NOR** **−5**	**STG** **−3**	**PAR** **−8**	NEW +21	**MAN** **+5**	**SOU** **+18**	WES −7	PEN +2	PAR −5	**BAL** **−17**	**EAS** **−2**					
Cronulla-Sutherland Sharks	CBY +2	**EAS** **−11**	**BAL** **−10**	NOR +5	**STG** **+12**	NEW +27	**MAN** **+6**	SOU +1	PEN −1	PAR −7	**CBY** **−23**	EAS −4	BAL +8	**WES** **+11**	**NOR** **−6**	STG −5	**NEW** **+33**	MAN −4	**SOU** **+14**	WES +37	**PEN** **+31**	**PAR** **+5**					
Eastern Suburbs Roosters	BAL −4	CRO +11	**NOR** **+36**	STG −4	**NEW** **+39**	**MAN** **+20**	**SOU** **+11**	WES −8	**PAR** **−7**	**CBY** **+7**	**BAL**; **0**	**CRO** **+4**	NOR +18	PEN +15	**STG** **−13**	NEW +13	**MAN** **+12**	SOU +13	**WES** **+11**	**PEN** **+17**	PAR −8	CBY +2	STG −5	**BAL** **+24**	PAR −8		
Manly Warringah Sea Eagles	**SOU** **+18**	WES +7	PEN +24	**PAR** **−9**	**CBY** **−1**	EAS −20	CRO −6	NOR +14	NEW +5	**BAL** **−16**	SOU +4	**WES** **+11**	**PEN** **+5**	**STG** **+18**	PAR +2	CBY −5	EAS −12	**CRO** **+4**	**NOR** **+2**	STG −17	**NEW** **+48**	BAL +7	BAL −8				
Newtown Jets	**WES** **+7**	**PEN** **−11**	**PAR** **−11**	CBY −18	EAS −39	**CRO** **−27**	NOR −5	**STG** **−15**	**MAN** **−5**	SOU −13	WES −1	PEN −16	PAR −9	BAL −17	**CBY** **−21**	**EAS** **−13**	CRO −33	**NOR** **−23**	STG −14	**BAL** **−31**	MAN −48	**SOU** **+13**					
North Sydney Bears	PAR −3	**CBY**; **0**	EAS −36	**CRO** **−5**	BAL −19	**STG** **−17**	**NEW** **+5**	**MAN** **−14**	WES +1	**PEN** **+4**	**PAR** **−2**	CBY +5	**EAS** **−18**	SOU +19	CRO +6	**BAL** **−9**	**STG** **−15**	NEW +23	MAN −2	**SOU** **+16**	**WES** **+40**	PEN +8					
Parramatta Eels	**NOR** **+3**	**STG** **−13**	NEW +11	MAN +9	**SOU** **+18**	WES +8	**PEN** **+19**	**BAL** **+2**	EAS +7	**CRO** **+7**	NOR +2	STG +1	**NEW** **+9**	CBY +8	**MAN** **−2**	SOU +1	**WES** **+31**	PEN +19	BAL +20	**CBY** **+5**	**EAS** **+8**	CRO −5	X	**STG** **−5**	**EAS** **+8**	**STG**; **0**	**STG** **−22**
Penrith Panthers	STG −4	NEW +11	**MAN** **−24**	SOU −10	**WES** **−8**	BAL; 0	PAR −19	CBY −11	**CRO** **+1**	NOR −4	**STG** **+17**	**NEW** **+16**	MAN −5	**EAS** **−15**	**SOU** **+41**	WES +12	BAL −10	**PAR** **−19**	**CBY** **−2**	EAS −17	CRO −31	**NOR** **−8**					
South Sydney Rabbitohs	MAN −18	**BAL** **+2**	WES −29	**PEN** **+10**	PAR −18	**CBY** **−1**	EAS −11	**CRO** **−1**	STG −5	**NEW** **+13**	**MAN** **−4**	BAL −4	**WES** **−19**	**NOR** **−19**	PEN −41	**PAR** **−1**	CBY −18	**EAS** **−13**	CRO −14	NOR −16	**STG** **−9**	NEW −13					
St. George Dragons	**PEN** **+4**	PAR +13	**CBY** **−10**	**EAS** **+4**	CRO −12	NOR +17	BAL +9	NEW +15	**SOU** **+5**	**WES** **+8**	PEN −17	**PAR** **−1**	CBY +3	MAN −18	EAS +13	**CRO** **+5**	NOR +15	**BAL** **+4**	**NEW** **+14**	**MAN** **+17**	SOU +9	WES +45	**EAS** **+5**	PAR +5	X	PAR; 0	PAR +22
Western Suburbs Magpies	NEW −7	**MAN** **−7**	**SOU** **+29**	BAL −11	PEN +8	**PAR** **−8**	CBY +3	**EAS** **+8**	**NOR** **−1**	STG −8	**NEW** **+1**	MAN −11	SOU +19	CRO −11	**BAL** **−26**	**PEN** **−12**	PAR −31	**CBY** **+7**	EAS −11	**CRO** **−37**	NOR −40	**STG** **−45**					
Team	1	2	3	4	5	6	7	8	9	10	11	12	13	14	15	16	17	18	19	20	21	22	F1	F2	F3	GF	GFR

Bold – Home game
X – Bye
Opponent for round listed above margin

=== Ladder ===
	Team	Pld	W	D	L	PF	PA	PD	Pts
1	Parramatta	22	19	0	3	448	280	+168	38
2	St. George	22	17	0	5	402	260	+142	34
3	Eastern Suburbs	22	15	1	6	392	207	+185	31
4	Balmain	22	13	2	7	417	288	+129	28
5	Manly	22	14	0	8	352	269	+83	28
6	Cronulla	22	13	0	9	433	312	+121	26
7	Canterbury	22	10	1	11	283	239	+44	21
8	North Sydney	22	10	1	11	377	390	-13	21
9	Western Suburbs	22	7	0	15	247	438	-191	14
10	Penrith	22	6	1	15	319	408	-89	13
11	South Sydney	22	3	0	19	250	479	-229	6
12	Newtown	22	2	0	20	254	604	-350	4

=== Ladder progression ===
- Numbers highlighted in green indicate that the team finished the round inside the top 5.
- Numbers highlighted in blue indicates the team finished first on the ladder in that round.
- Numbers highlighted in red indicates the team finished last place on the ladder in that round.

	Team	1	2	3	4	5	6	7	8	9	10	11	12	13	14	15	16	17	18	19	20	21	22
1	Parramatta Eels	2	2	4	6	8	10	12	14	16	18	20	22	24	26	26	28	30	32	34	36	38	38
2	St. George Dragons	2	4	4	6	6	8	10	12	14	16	16	16	18	18	20	22	24	26	28	30	32	34
3	Eastern Suburbs Roosters	0	2	4	4	6	8	10	10	10	12	13	15	17	19	19	21	23	25	27	29	29	31
4	Balmain Tigers	2	2	4	6	8	9	9	9	11	13	14	16	16	18	20	22	24	24	24	26	28	28
5	Manly Warringah Sea Eagles	2	4	6	6	6	6	6	8	10	10	12	14	16	18	20	20	20	22	24	24	26	28
6	Cronulla-Sutherland Sharks	2	2	2	4	6	8	10	12	12	12	12	12	14	16	16	16	18	18	20	22	24	26
7	Canterbury-Bankstown	0	1	3	5	7	9	9	11	11	11	13	13	13	13	15	17	19	19	21	21	21	21
8	North Sydney Bears	0	1	1	1	1	1	3	3	5	7	7	9	9	11	13	13	13	15	15	17	19	21
9	Western Suburbs Magpies	0	0	2	2	4	4	6	8	8	8	10	10	12	12	12	12	12	14	14	14	14	14
10	Penrith Panthers	0	2	2	2	2	3	3	3	5	5	7	9	9	9	11	13	13	13	13	13	13	13
11	South Sydney Rabbitohs	0	2	2	4	4	4	4	4	4	6	6	6	6	6	6	6	6	6	6	6	6	6
12	Newtown Jets	2	2	2	2	2	2	2	2	2	2	2	2	2	2	2	2	2	2	2	2	2	4

== Finals ==
Home	Score	Away	Match Information
Home	Score	Away	Date and Time	Venue	Referee	Crowd
Qualifying Finals
St. George	19–14	Eastern Suburbs	27 August 1977	Sydney Cricket Ground	Jack Danzey	28,288
Balmain	23–15	Manly-Warringah	28 August 1977	Sydney Cricket Ground	Gary Cook	20,716
Semi-finals
Parramatta	5–10	St. George	3 September 1977	Sydney Cricket Ground	Jack Danzey	29,794
Eastern Suburbs	26–2	Balmain	4 September 1977	Sydney Cricket Ground	Gary Cook	23,785
Preliminary final
Parramatta	13–5	Eastern Suburbs	10 September 1977	Sydney Cricket Ground	Gary Cook	39,095
Grand finals
St. George	9–9	Parramatta	17 September 1977	Sydney Cricket Ground	Gary Cook	65,959
St. George	22–0	Parramatta	24 September 1977	Sydney Cricket Ground	Gary Cook	47,828

=== Chart ===
Qualifying final
2	St. George	19
3	Eastern Suburbs	14
4	Balmain	23
5	Manly	15

Major semi-final
1	Parramatta	5
St. George	10
Minor semi-final
Eastern Suburbs	26
Balmain	2

Preliminary final
Parramatta	13
Eastern Suburbs	5

Grand final
St. George	22*
Parramatta	0*

* - Indicates only the replay match, and not the match ending in a draw.

=== Grand final ===
St. George	Position	Parramatta
1. Ted Goodwin	FB	18. Phil Mann
2. Stephen Butler	WG	2. Jim Porter
3. Graham Quinn	CE	3. Mick Cronin
4. Robert Finch	CE	4. Ed Sulkowicz
5. John Chapman	WG	5. Graeme Atkins
6. Rod McGregor	FE	1. Mark Levy
7. Mark Shulman	HB	7. John Kolc
13. Bruce Starkey	PR	13. Graham Olling
12. Steve Edge (c)	HK	12. Ron Hilditch
11. Craig Young	PR	14. John Baker
10. Robert Stone	SR	10. Geoff Gerard
9. John Jansen	SR	9. Ray Higgs (c)
8. Rod Reddy	LK	8. Ray Price
14. Tony Quirk	Res.	6. John Peard
17. John Bailey	Res.	11. Denis Fitzgerald
Harry Bath	Coach	Terry Fearnley

Parramatta boasted an experienced team, making their second consecutive Grand final appearance. The young St. George side dubbed "Bath's Babes", were able to draw on the experience and wiles of their coach Harry Bath, and as the day of the decider approached the betting market narrowed.

A crowd of 66,000 flocked to the Sydney Cricket Ground to see an enthusiastic St. George side come out with all guns blazing. Dragons lock forward “Rocket” Rod Reddy, initially dominated proceedings with his brutal defensive play.

In attack, diminutive Dragons halfback Mark Shulman made inroads and they went ahead 4–0 with two penalty goals to Ted Goodwin. Just before half time, "Lord Ted" scored a miraculous try when he burst through and chipped ahead from halfway. Confronting his opposite fullback Phil Mann, Goodwin kicked again. A foot race followed with cover defenders Graeme Atkins and Ed Sulkowicz joining. The ball trickled towards the dead-ball line but Goodwin got there first, hitting the ground hard and knocking himself out in the process. He had run 50 yards (46 m) and beat every defender to score a breathtaking individual try. John Chapman converted and Goodwin unsteady on his feet for the rest of the half had given his side a handy 9–0 lead going into the break.

The second half began like the first, with uncompromising defence. Reddy was targeting Parramatta's champion lock, Ray Price but in the process gave away a number of penalties. Goodwin was felled in an off the ball incident early after the break and took no further part. Mick Cronin slotted three pressure goals to make it 9–6 and the older Eels were well positioned for a comeback against a tiring Dragons defence.

With 10 minutes to run, Parramatta pounced when Cronin drew three defenders and found Price in support who stepped through and gave a final pass to Sulkowicz who scored the equaliser out wide. Now Parramatta had the chance to snatch victory through Mick Cronin’s conversion attempt. A prolific goalkicker throughout his career, Cronin had an opportunity which young players dream of – to kick his team to premiership glory. However, the ball sailed to the right of the uprights and moments later the full-time scoreboard read 9–9. For the first time in history, a New South Wales Rugby Football League Grand final was forced into 20 minutes extra time.

Parramatta took command of the restart and looked strong. The Eels almost scored when prop Graham Olling found space near the line, but he failed to pass to his unmarked front rower partner Ron Hilditch. St. George then lifted a notch, grafted out some territory towards the Eels' end and began to think of field goals. Shulman and Chapman both made unsuccessful attempts before reserve Tony Quirk had a third attempt from close range. Quirk's kick initially looked on target but the ball bounced off the post and into the arms of St. George's hooker, Steve Edge. He grounded the ball over the line but was ruled offside by referee Gary Cook.

With one minute left Cook awarded a penalty to the Dragons within kicking range. In a final twist, Chapman's attempt went the same way as Cronin's earlier kick and after 100 minutes of Grand final play, the scores were still locked at 9–9. The players initially appeared confused, then began shaking hands. The ground announcer advised that a replay would be required.

Greenwood's reference described the match as “the game of the century”. This is a bold claim but it was undoubtedly a brave effort by both sides and a ground-breaking match in Australian rugby league history.

St. George 9 (Tries: Goodwin. Goals: Goodwin 2, Chapman.)

Parramatta 9 (Tries: Sulkowicz. Goals: Cronin

=== Grand final replay ===
St. George	Position	Parramatta
1. Ted Goodwin	FB	1. Mark Levy
2. Stephen Butler	WG	2. Jim Porter
3. Graham Quinn	CE	3. Mick Cronin
4. Robert Finch	CE	4. Ed Sulkowicz
5. John Chapman	WG	5. Graeme Atkins
6. Rod McGregor	FE	6. John Peard
17. John Bailey	HB	7. John Kolc
13. Bruce Starkey	PR	13. Graham Olling
12. Steve Edge (c)	HK	12. Ron Hilditch
11. Craig Young	PR	14. John Baker
10. Robert Stone	SR	10. Geoff Gerard
9. John Jansen	SR	9. Ray Higgs(c)
8.Rod Reddy	LK	8. Ray Price
20. Barry Beath	Reserve	11. Denis Fitzgerald
Harry Bath	Coach	Terry Fearnley

From the first match, the Dragons had lost halfback Mark Shulman, who suffered a kneeing in the back by Parramatta skipper Ray Higgs, although otherwise their team had come through unscathed. The Parramatta camp had players showing multiple cuts, bruises and bite marks with Ray Price in particular looking like he had been used as a punching bag.

Although a grand final replay had not occurred in the Australian game, the young Dragons were able to draw on the experience of "the Old Fox", Harry Bath who had played in the drawn 1953–54 Challenge Cup Final at Wembley in England, and whose Warrington side won the replay in front of a then record crowd of over 102,000. The 1977 VFL grand final played the same day, also finished as a draw and would need to be replayed.

With a strong breeze at their backs, St George began the match in a determined fashion and were soon in front 7–0 when John Jansen scored following a great forward charge by tireless front rower Bruce Starkey; the final pass, though was at least a metre forward.

Twelve minutes into the second half, St George furthered their lead with a penalty goal to Ted Goodwin. Led by Steve Edge, Craig Young and Robert Stone, with the ruthlessness of Rod Reddy and the experience of veteran Barry Beath, the strong Dragons forward pack laid a good foundation and as the match wore on their backline took advantage. Robert Finch and Graham Quinn began to find room in the centres, and the halves John Bailey and Rod McGregor started to outpace their older opposition. A field goal from Goodwin took the score to 10–0 and then after Parramatta were found offside, Goodwin kicked another penalty goal.

An incident occurred when touch judge Brian Barry was hit by a projectile from the crowd and collapsed. He had to be replaced by a referees' official, Ray O'Donnell, who was wearing normal street attire. For the remainder of the match top referee Jack Danzey acted as touch judge on the eastern side.

Late in the match, Robert Stone found the ball and ran 30 metres to score a rare forward's try right in front of the St. George faithful who, as per the club's tradition, had massed in the Sheridan Stand. With a scoreline of 17–0 the Dragons had the game but then, following a wonderful display of backing up, Saints were awarded a penalty try by referee Gary Cook when John Bailey was taken out by the tired defence. After Goodwin's final conversion and 180 minutes of bone-crushing football, St George were declared the 1977 champions, winning their club's 14th premiership 22–0.

It was a fitting farewell for the stalwart Dragons second rower Barry Beath, the last Dragon to retire who had been involved as a player in their unbeaten eleven-year run of the mid 50s to 60s. Beath is credited with the unusual statistic of winning a premiership in his first season (1966) and his last (1977), but none in ten seasons between.

St. George 22 (Tries: Jansen, Stone, Bailey. Goals: Goodwin 6. Field Goal: Goodwin)

Parramatta 0

== Player statistics ==
The following statistics are as of the conclusion of Round 22.

Top 5 point scorers

Points	Player	Tries	Goals	Field Goals
213	Mick Cronin	7	95	2
175	Greg Cox	3	83	0
146	Steve Rogers	11	56	1
141	John Gray	3	66	0
137	Graham Eadie	3	64	0

Top 5 try scorers

Tries	Player
17	Russel Gartner
14	Bob Fulton
14	Barry Wood
12	Jim Porter
12	Mike Fish
12	Ron Giteau
12	Terry Fahey

Top 5 goal scorers

Goals	Player
95	Mick Cronin
83	Greg Cox
66	John Gray
64	Graham Eadie
56	Steve Rogers
