= Bronx Goodwin =

NZ Maori international rugby league footballer

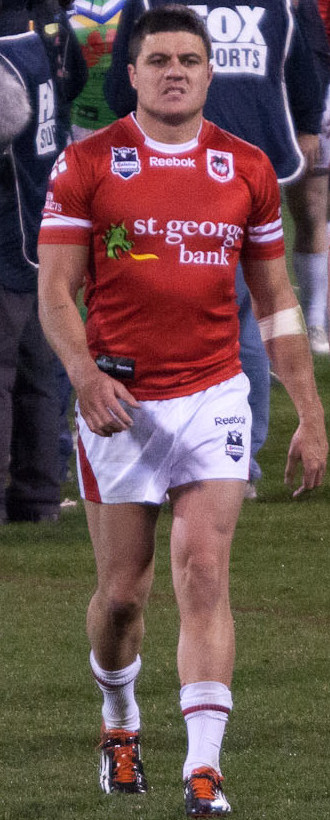

Personal information
- Full name: Bronx Goodwin
- Born: 5 November 1984 (age 42) Parkes, New South Wales, Australia

Playing information
- Height: 183 cm (6 ft 0 in)
- Weight: 91 kg (14 st 5 lb)
- Position: Wing, Fullback
Club
Years	Team	Pld	T	G	FG	P
2007–08	Canberra Raiders	23	7	0	0	28
2009	Cronulla Sharks	4	0	0	0	0
2011–12	St. George Illawarra	5	2	0	0	8
	Total	32	9	0	0	36
Representative
Years	Team	Pld	T	G	FG	P
2008	New Zealand Māori	1	0	2	0	4
- Father: Ted Goodwin
- Relatives: Bryson Goodwin (brother); Luke Goodwin (brother); Joel Reddy (brother-in-law)

Bronx Goodwin (born 5 November 1984) is a former professional rugby league footballer who played as a winger or fullback.

He was head coach of the St. George Illawarra Dragons NSW Cup team for 2023.

== Background ==
He is the son of Australian former International Ted Goodwin, brother of Luke and Bryson, and brother-in-law of former South Sydney player Joel Reddy. Goodwin is of Māori descent.

== Playing career ==
Goodwin made his first grade debut for Canberra in round 9 of the 2007 NRL season against South Sydney at Telstra Stadium.

He was released by Canberra at the end of the 2008 NRL season. He spent 2009 at the Cronulla-Sutherland Sharks before joining rivals St. George Illawarra for the 2010 NRL season. Goodwin made no appearances for St. George in 2010 as the club won the premiership defeating the Sydney Roosters in the 2010 NRL Grand Final.

Goodwin had his contract extended for a further year to stay with St. George for the 2011 NRL season. He was released by St. George at the end of 2012.

In 2013, after a knee reconstruction and torn pectoral muscle brought on a bout of depression, Goodwin took an off-field position with the Dragons Welfare Program to assist players with mental health issues.

In 2015, he played for Wests in the Illawarra Rugby League competition.

== Representative career ==
Goodwin has previously played for the New South Wales Māori side under his brother Luke.

In 2008, he played for the New Zealand Māori side in the curtain raiser to the 2008 World Cup.

== Controversy ==
In 2008, Goodwin was placed on a 12-month good behaviour bond and ordered to pay a $1,300 fine in relation to an incident at a Canberra pub. Goodwin pleaded guilty to assaulting two patrons outside the All Bar Nun pub in north Canberra on 20 July 2008. Goodwin had been drinking with former team-mate Todd Carney before the incident took place. As a result of his conviction, Goodwin was terminated by the Canberra Raiders. Canberra CEO Don Furner spoke to the media saying "The board of the club met today with Bronx and his manager and decided to terminate his contract, We will provide any counselling if he requires it, but he will no longer be with the club".
