= Luke Goodwin =

NZ Māori international rugby league footballer and coach

Personal information
- Full name: Luke Goodwin
- Born: 18 January 1973 (age 53) Parkes, New South Wales, Australia

Playing information
- Position: Wing, Fullback, Five-eighth
Club
Years	Team	Pld	T	G	FG	P
1992	Penrith Panthers	10	2	2	0	12
1993–94	Canterbury Bulldogs	15	3	16	3	47
1996	Western Reds	3	1	4	0	12
1997	Oldham Bears	22	10	17	2	76
1998	London Broncos	12	3	1	1	15
1999	Western Suburbs	5	0	0	0	0
	Total	67	19	40	6	162
Representative
Years	Team	Pld	T	G	FG	P
1993	NSW Country	1	0	0	0	0
1999–06	New Zealand Māori	2	0	2	0	4

Coaching information
Club
Years	Team	Gms	W	D	L	W%
2008	New Zealand Māori	2	0	0	2	0
- Father: Ted Goodwin
- Relatives: Bryson Goodwin (brother); Bronx Goodwin (brother); Joel Reddy (brother-in-law)

Luke Goodwin (born 18 January 1973) is a former professional rugby league footballer who played in Australia and England and represented Aotearoa Māori in 2000.

== Background ==
He is the son of rugby league legend, Edward 'Lord Ted' Goodwin who represented Australia. He is also the elder brother of fellow players, Bronx, Bryson and Grayson.

== Playing career ==
Goodwin played in both Australia (NRL - Canberra Raiders '91, Penrith Panthers '92, Canterbury-Bankstown Bulldogs '93-'95, Western Reds '96, Western Suburbs Magpies '99) and England (Super League - Oldham Bears '97, London Broncos '98).

Goodwin began his career joining the Canberra Raiders in 1991 but did not play any first grade. In 1992 he joined the Penrith Panthers where he played ten first grade games. His 1992 stat ended up scoring two tries and booting two goals for 12 points. In 1993 he joined the Canterbury-Bankstown Bulldogs. He played 14 first grade games in 1993 and then got dropped to reserve grade for the rest of the 1993 season. In 1994 he only played one first grade game and was dropped back to reserve grade for the rest of the 1994 season. In 1995 he joined the Parramatta Eels and did not play any first grade. In 1996 he joined the Western Reds where he played 3 first grade games. In 1997 he went over to England and joined the Oldham Bears. In 1998 he joined the London Broncos where he played 12 games. In 1999 he returned to Australia and joined the Western Suburbs Magpies where he played five first grade games. He played one Cap of International Rugby League, it was at the 2000 Rugby League World Cup for New Zealand Maori where he booted two goals and he played one game of Representative Rugby League for NSW Country in 1993.

== Representative career ==
Goodwin played for the NSW Country team in the City vs Country Origin match in 1993.

Goodwin also represented New Zealand Māori in 1999 and 2000, at the World Cup. He made a cameo appearance off the bench in a match against Fii in 2006.

== Coaching career ==
Since 2002 he has been involved with the New South Wales Māori Rugby League programme.

In 2008 he coached the Southern Sharks in the Jim Beam Cup.

In 2008 he was the coach of the New Zealand Māori side which played in the opening game of the 2008 World Cup.

Goodwin coached the Port Kembla Club in the Illawarra District Rugby League in 2002 & 2003, reaching the finals both years.
