= Stephen Butler (businessman) =

American businessman (born 1944)

Stephen Butler (Born April 27, 1944) is the President and cofounder of Pension Dynamics Corporation. He is known for the Butler Index and is the author of two books on 401(k) plans.

== Early life and education ==
Butler earned his undergraduate degree from Harvard University and attended Haas School of Business.

== Career ==
Butler founded Pension Dynamics Corporation in 1978.

In 1995 Butler published his first book, The Decision-Maker's Guide to 401(k) Plans, which led to his testimony at the 1998 US Department of Labor hearings regarding hidden fees in 401(k) plans. In addition to Butler's statement before the US Department of Labor, the hearing cited his book and a survey he conducted.

In 2007 Butler testified before the US House of Representatives Committee on Education and Labor regarding hidden 401(k) fees.

Butler is also a weekly columnist in several Bay Area newspapers, including The Mercury News.

== Personal life ==
Butler and his wife reside in Lafayette, California with their two dogs. He is an avid jazz musician and plays the acoustic bass violin.

== Books ==
- The Decision-Maker's Guide to 401(k) Plans: How to Set Up Cost-Effective Plans in Companies of All Sizes (Berrett-Koehler, 1995), ISBN 1-881052-64-8
- 401(K) Today: Designing, Maintaining, & Maximizing Your Company's Plan (Berrett-Koehler, 1999), ISBN 1-57675-063-9
