= Ted Goodwin =

Australia international rugby league footballer

Personal information
- Full name: Edward John Goodwin
- Born: 4 August 1951 (age 75) Crows Nest, Australia
- Height: 182 cm (6 ft 0 in)
- Weight: 97 kg (15 st 4 lb)

Playing information
- Position: Centre, Fullback, Wing
Club
Years	Team	Pld	T	G	FG	P
1972–78	St George Dragons	116	52	82	2	322
1979	Newtown Jets	6	1	1	0	5
1980–82	Western Suburbs Magpies	24	4	0	1	13
	Total	146	57	83	3	340
Representative
Years	Team	Pld	T	G	FG	P
1972–76	New South Wales	9	1	0	0	4
1972–73	Australia	4	2	0	0	6
- Source: NRL Stats, Rugby League Project
- Relatives: Bronx Goodwin (son); Bryson Goodwin (son); Luke Goodwin (son); Joel Reddy (son-in-law)

Ted "Lord Ted" Goodwin (born 4 August 1951) is an Australian former professional rugby league footballer in the NSWRL competition. Goodwin played for the St George Dragons, Newtown Jets and Western Suburbs Magpies as well as representing for Country and New South Wales and Australia.

== Career ==
Goodwin was born in the Sydney Suburb Crows Nest to New Zealand immigrants. His father was an Anglo-New Zealander and his mother was a Māori. As a Dapto High School junior, Goodwin held a long club career. He signed with St George Dragons in 1972 after coming to talent scouts' attention when representing for Country from the Dapto club. Ted Goodwin played seven seasons for the St George Dragons between 1972 and 1978, winning the 1977 Grand Final.

=== St George Dragons, 1972-1978 ===
Goodwin played in three first grade Grand Finals with St George: the 1975 loss to Eastern Suburbs, the 1977 9–9 draw with Parramatta and the subsequent replay, won by St George, 22–0. In the drawn 1977 match, he scored when he regathered the ball after a chip and chase, grounding it just before the dead-ball line, knocking himself unconscious in the process when his face smacked the hard Sydney Cricket Ground stadium surface. He took no further part in the match, but backed up the following week to kick six goals and a field-goal in the replay. Ted was nicknamed 'Lord Ted' by the late St. George coach Len Kelly in the early 1970s. Goodwin is still called 'Lord Ted,' even today.

=== 1979-1982 ===
Goodwin played his final season with the St George Dragons in 1978, had a one-season stay at Newtown Jets in 1979, and resurrected his career as a tough, dynamic centre with the Roy Masters coached Western Suburbs Magpies sides of 1980–1982. He was later named in the Western Suburbs Magpies Team of the Eighties. He finished his playing days in New South Wales Country Rugby League with stints as captain-coach at Parkes and Forbes in Group 11 and also with the Willagee Bears in 1989–90 in the Western Australian Rugby League competition.

== Representative career ==
Having earlier represented for Country from Dapto, Goodwin made eight state appearances for New South Wales during his St George years. In 1972 he made his national representative debut as a reserve in the second Test against New Zealand. He was selected on the 1973 Kangaroo tour led by his club captain Graeme Langlands. Goodwin appeared in six minor tour matches and on the wing in a Test match against Great Britain and in two against France. He scored seven tries on the tour, two in the first French Test. He is listed on the Australian Players Register as Kangaroo No.463.

== Post-playing ==
Goodwin went on to become a graded referee in Perth and up until 2001 held a position as Development Officer with the Western Australian Rugby League. He was instrumental in schools development of the code in Western Australia in the 1990s. In 2002 he was a referee for junior rugby league in Sydney's Sutherland Shire refereeing the 13B's Grand Final at Endeavour Field.

== Sons ==
Three of Goodwin's six sons, Luke, Bronx, and Bryson, played first grade rugby league in Australia.

== Sources ==
- Andrews, Malcolm (2006) The ABC of Rugby League Austn Broadcasting Corpn, Sydney
- Whiticker, Alan & Hudson, Glen (2006) The Encyclopedia of Rugby League Players, Gavin Allen Publishing, Sydney
