= Harry Bath =

Australian rugby league coach and former player (1924–2008)

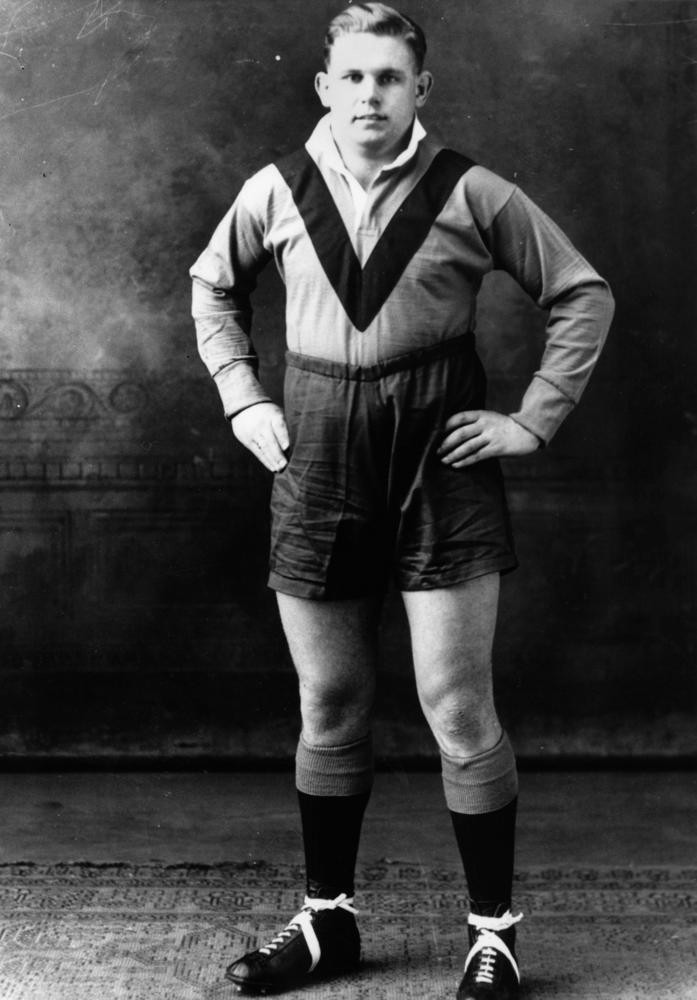

Personal information
- Full name: Alfred Henry Bath
- Born: 28 November 1924 Brisbane, Queensland, Australia
- Died: 4 October 2008 (aged 83) Cronulla, New South Wales, Australia

Playing information
- Position: Second-row
Club
Years	Team	Pld	T	G	FG	P
1940–45	Souths (Brisbane)	39	11	22	0	77
1946–47	Balmain	30	11	0	0	33
1948	Barrow	18	3	3	0	15
1948–56	Warrington	346	90	812	0	1804
1957–59	St. George	60	10	240	0	510
	Total	493	125	1077	0	2439
Representative
Years	Team	Pld	T	G	FG	P
1945	Queensland	4	1	0	0	3
1946–47	New South Wales	4	3	0	0	9
1952	British Empire XIII
1949–55	Other Nationalities	10	1	20		43

Coaching information
Club
Years	Team	Gms	W	D	L	W%
1961–66	Balmain	117	65	3	49	56
1969–72	Newtown	88	33	4	51	38
1977–81	St. George	110	65	4	41	59
	Total	315	163	11	141	52
Representative
Years	Team	Gms	W	D	L	W%
1962–72	City Firsts	6	5	0	1	83
1962–72	New South Wales	13	10	1	2	77
1962–72	Australia	20	12	1	7	60
- Source: As of 10 January 2016

Harry Bath (28 November 1924 – 4 October 2008), born Alfred Henry Bath, also known by the nickname of "The Old Fox", was an Australian rugby league footballer and coach who was prominent and influential in the mid-20th century. A state and international representative who played 12 matches for Other Nationalities in the International Championship from 1949 to 1955, he played as a second-row and has been referred to as the best Australian rugby league player never to be picked for the Australian national team. Following his retirement, Bath coached in the New South Wales Rugby Football League premiership for two decades, also achieving selection as the Australian national team coach.

== Playing career ==
=== Australia ===
Bath, to be known late in his career as 'the Old Fox', was graded as a sixteen-year-old to play for the Brisbane club Southern Suburbs in 1940. After six years with the club, including selection to represent Queensland, he moved to Sydney to play for the Balmain club in New South Wales Rugby Football League season 1946. He represented Queensland in 1945 and New South Wales in 1946 after one Sydney season. In the 1946 fixture for NSW against the touring Great Britain side he badly injured his leg and so was unavailable for Australian Test selection a week later. Also in his first season for Balmain, Bath helped his side reach the Grand Final in which they defeated St. George 13–12. In 1947 he again won a premiership with the Balmain Tigers. He was also selected to play for Australia against a touring England side that year but injured his leg in a club match and was prevented from playing in any of the three tests. A year later he again helped Balmain reach their second Grand Final appearance and a 13–9 victory over the Canterbury-Bankstown club.

=== England ===
Harry Bath then accepted an offer to play in Britain for Barrow. The forward only stayed at Barrow for six months before being signed by Warrington. He spent a total of nine seasons with Warrington, playing 346 games for the club. Harry Bath played at second-row and was captain in Warrington's 19–0 victory over Widnes in the 1949–50 Challenge Cup Final during the 1949–50 season at Wembley Stadium, London on Saturday 6 May 1950, in front of a crowd of 94,249, played in the 4–4 draw with Halifax in the 1953–54 Challenge Cup Final during the 1953–54 season at Wembley Stadium, London on Saturday 24 April 1954, in front of a crowd of 81,841, and played at second-row, and scored a conversion in the 8–4 victory over Halifax in the 1953–54 Challenge Cup Final replay during the 1953–54 season at Odsal Stadium, Bradford on Wednesday 5 May 1954, in front of a record crowd of 102,575 or more. Bath's reputation as a skillful ball-player and a great goal-kicker grew while playing in Britain. He scored over 700 goals in his career, including 173 goals in 1952–53 when he was the season's leading goal kicker.

Bath played at second-row in Warrington's 8–14 defeat by Wigan in the 1948–49 Lancashire Cup Final during the 1948–49 season at Station Road, Swinton on Saturday 13 November 1948, and played at second-row in the 5–28 defeat by Wigan in the 1950–51 Lancashire Cup Final during the 1949–50 season at Station Road, Swinton on Saturday 4 November 1950. He played for the British Empire XIII versus New Zealand on Wednesday 23 January 1952 at Stamford Bridge.

=== Return to Australia ===
Bath returned to Australia in 1957 and joined St. George after his former club Balmain decided against a signing due to his age of 33. In the 1957 NSWRFL season St. George were premiers, winning the Grand Final against Manly-Warringah 31–9.

He was the leading point scorer in the competition in 1958 scoring a season club record of 225 points (3 tries, 108 goals). His 16-point tally in the Grand Final has never been equaled. In 1958 St. George again made it to the Grand Final this time defeating Western Suburbs 20–9. Bath again topped the season's point scoring table, totalling 211 points. The following season St. George again won the premiership with a 20–0 Grand Final victory over Manly. Bath was sent off in the Grand Final for fighting with Manly's Rex Mossop.

It has been suggested that Bath was punished by the Australian selectors for the ten years he spent in the English league. However he was 33 years old when he returned to Australia for his last three seasons and he was then competing for a representative position against star players Norm Provan and Rex Mossop. He retired at the end of 1959 at the age of 35.

== Playing records ==
Bath became the only player to have won a premiership in every season of his Sydney first-grade career (1946 and 1947 with Balmain and 1957, 1958, and 1959 with St. George). His eight goals from eight attempts in the 1957 Grand Final is the standing record for the most goals in a grand final and the most points scored in a grand final (16).

He holds two places in the record of top point scorers in one season by position. His 205 points scored in 1959 are the most ever scored by a prop in a season and the 225 points of 1958 stands as the most ever scored by a second-row in a season.

== Coaching career ==
Bath took up a career in rugby league coaching and joined the inaugural NSWRL coaching panel in 1961. He was selected manager, coach and as the sole selector for the Australian national team's 1962 Ashes series.

Bath's greatest achievement in coaching the national side was leading the Kangaroos to World Cup glory in the 1968 and 1970 World Cups. He also coached the team on tours of New Zealand in 1969 and 1971. He coached the national side in the 1972 World Cup in which they lost to Great Britain in controversial circumstances. The World Cup Final was tied at 10–10 after full-time and was still locked after extra time. Great Britain were awarded the victory due to a higher points table placing after the pool rounds of the competition.

Harry Bath also took the coaching helm at his former club Balmain. He guided them to Grand Final appearances in 1964 and 1966 both lost against St. George 6–11 and 4–23 respectively. He also coached Newtown between 1969 and 1972.

He came out of retirement to coach his other former club St. George Dragons to premiership success in 1977. The Grand Final against Parramatta was drawn 9–9 but St. George won the replay 22–0. He again coached the Dragons to premiership success in 1979 after their 17–13 Grand Final victory over Canterbury. His side was nicknamed 'Bath's Babes' due to the side's youthful roster. He retired from Rugby League coaching in 1981.

== Accolades ==
Bath was recognised in 2004 for his outstanding achievements in playing and coaching rugby league when was inducted into the Australian Rugby League Hall of Fame. In February 2008, Bath was named in a list of Australia's 100 Greatest Players (1908–2007) which was commissioned by the NRL and ARL to celebrate the code's centenary year in Australia.

Bath is also a Warrington RLFC Hall of Fame inductee. On 20 July 2022, Bath was named in the St. George Dragons District Rugby League Club's team of the century.

== Death ==
Bath died after a long illness on 4 October 2008, 55 days short of his 84th birthday. "Harry's loss will be felt by many within the game", NRL boss David Gallop said. "He is one of the few people to have a distinguished career as both a player and a coach." His funeral was held at St. Andrew's Church, Cronulla on 9 October 2008 and he was cremated at Woronora Memorial Park. A largely attended wake was held for Harry at the St. George Leagues Club after the funeral service. His ashes have been memorialised at Woronora Memorial Park at Henry Lawson Garden Walk, section GWR no. 0135

== Sources ==
- Andrews, Malcolm (2006) The ABC of Rugby League Austn Broadcasting Corpn, Sydney
