= 1976 Manly-Warringah Sea Eagles season =

- NSWRFL champions
- NSWRFL rank: 1st
- 1976 record: Wins: 18; draws: 0; losses: 7
- Points scored: For: 544; against: 300

Team information
- Secretary: (Australia) Ken Arthurson
- Coach: (Australia) Frank Stanton
- Captain: (Australia) Bob Fulton
- Stadium: Brookvale Oval

Top scorers
- Tries: (Australia) Bob Fulton (21)
- Goals: (Australia) Graham Eadie (103)
- Points: (Australia) Graham Eadie (233)
← 1975	1977 →

The 1976 Manly-Warringah Sea Eagles season was the 30th in the club's history since their entry into the then New South Wales Rugby Football League premiership in 1947.

The 1976 Sea Eagles were coached by 1963–64 Kangaroo tourist Frank Stanton. Captaining the side was brilliant centre Bob Fulton. The club competed in the New South Wales Rugby Football League's 1976 Premiership season and played its home games at the 27,000 capacity Brookvale Oval.

== Ladder ==
	Team	Pld	W	D	L	PF	PA	PD	Pts
1	Manly-Warringah	22	16	0	6	499	252	+247	32
2	Parramatta	22	14	2	6	347	238	+109	30
3	St. George	22	14	0	8	328	298	+30	28
4	Eastern Suburbs	22	13	1	8	399	250	+149	27
5	Canterbury-Bankstown	22	12	3	7	361	337	+24	27
6	Balmain	22	12	1	9	318	287	+31	25
7	Western Suburbs	22	11	2	9	379	313	+66	24
8	Cronulla-Sutherland	22	9	1	12	378	393	-15	19
9	Penrith	22	8	1	13	352	333	+19	17
10	South Sydney	22	8	0	14	297	421	-124	16
11	North Sydney	22	6	1	15	272	526	-254	13
12	Newtown	22	3	0	19	264	546	-282	6

== Regular season ==
Sunday 21 March	Cronulla-Sutherland Sharks	15 – 27	Manly-Warringah Sea Eagles	Endeavour Field, Sydney
	Tries: Dave Chamberlain, Greg Mullane, Glenn Stolzenheim; Goals: Barry Andrews (3/6)	[ Report]	Tries: Graham Eadie, Rod Jackson, Tom Mooney, Terry Randall, Gary Thoroughgood; Goals: Graham Eadie (6/8)	Attendance: 7,629; Referee: Gary Cook

Sunday 28 March	Manly-Warringah Sea Eagles	17 – 13	Western Suburbs Magpies	Brookvale Oval, Sydney
	Tries: Graham Eadie, Rod Jackson, Tom Mooney; Goals: Graham Eadie (4/8)	[ Report]	Tries: Ron Giteau, Graeme O'Grady, Peter Young; Goals: Graeme O'Grady (2/5)	Attendance: 12,059; Referee: Greg Hartley

Sunday 4 April	Canterbury-Bankstown Bulldogs	21 – 31	Manly-Warringah Sea Eagles	Belmore Oval, Sydney
	Tries: Mick Ryan (2), Don Moseley, Peter O'Neill, George Peponis; Goals: Graeme Hughes (3/6)	[ Report]	Tries: Ray Branighan, Graham Eadie, Bob Fulton, Rod Jackson, Max Krilich, Ian Martin, Col Parkes; Goals: Graham Eadie (5/9)	Attendance: 16,046; Referee: Richie Humphreys

Sunday 11 April	Manly-Warringah Sea Eagles	30 – 4	St. George Dragons	Brookvale Oval, Sydney
	Tries: Bob Fulton (2), Rod Jackson (2), Col Parkes, Terry Randall; Goals: Graham Eadie (6/9)	[ Report]	Tries: Goals: Henry Tatana (2/5)	Attendance: 18,077; Referee: Jack Danzey

Sunday 18 April	Parramatta Eels	8 – 5	Manly-Warringah Sea Eagles	Cumberland Oval, Sydney
	Tries: Ray Price (2); Goals: John Peard (1/4)	[ Report]	Tries: Tom Mooney; Goals: Graham Eadie (1/4)	Attendance: 14,543; Referee: Greg Hartley

Sunday 25 April	Manly-Warringah Sea Eagles	38 – 13	North Sydney Bears	Brookvale Oval, Sydney
	Tries: Bob Fulton (2), Phil Lowe (2), Max Krilich, Tom Mooney; Goals: Graham Eadie (10/10)	[ Report]	Tries: Bruce Walker, Rex Murphy; Goals: John Gray (1/3); Mark Tonks (1/1)	Attendance: 13,057; Referee: Col Turnell

Saturday 1 May	Eastern Suburbs Roosters	19 – 18	Manly-Warringah Sea Eagles	Sydney Cricket Ground, Sydney
	Tries: Ron Coote, Russell Fairfax, Mark Harris; Goals: John Brass (3/4); Royce Ayliffe (2/4)	[ Report]	Tries: Graham Eadie, Russel Gartner, Rod Jackson, Mick Waller; Goals: Graham Eadie (3/6)	Attendance: 22,861; Referee: Kevin Roberts

Saturday 8 May	Manly-Warringah Sea Eagles	27 – 14	Penrith Panthers	Brookvale Oval, Sydney
	Tries: Tom Mooney (4), Phil Lowe (2), Bob Fulton; Goals: Graham Eadie (3/9)	[ Report]	Tries: John King (2); Goals: Ken Wilson (4/5)	Attendance: 9,314; Referee: Don Macdonald

Sunday 16 May	Newtown Bluebags	6 – 57	Manly-Warringah Sea Eagles	Henson Park, Sydney
	Tries: Goals: John Bradstock (3/5)	[ Report]	Tries: Bob Fulton (3), Tom Mooney (3), Ian Martin (2), Ray Branighan, Graham Eadie, John Harvey, Max Krilich, Alan Thompson; Goals: Graham Eadie (9/13)	Attendance: 2,825; Referee: Richie Humphreys

Sunday 23 May	South Sydney Rabbitohs	16 – 18	Manly-Warringah Sea Eagles	Redfern Oval, Sydney
	Tries: Bernard Lowther, John Marsh; Goals: Greg Purcell (5/8)	[ Report]	Tries: Bob Fulton (2); Goals: Graham Eadie (6/9)	Attendance: 11,198; Referee: Col Turnell

Sunday 30 May	Manly-Warringah Sea Eagles	14 – 0	Balmain Tigers	Brookvale Oval, Sydney
	Tries: Bob Fulton, Tom Mooney; Goals: Ray Branighan (6/8)	[ Report]	Tries: Goals:	Attendance: 25,876; Referee: Greg Hartley

Sunday 6 June	Manly-Warringah Sea Eagles	17 – 12	Eastern Suburbs Roosters	Brookvale Oval, Sydney
	Tries: Ray Branighan, Bob Fulton, Tom Mooney; Goals: Graham Eadie (4/4)	[ Report]	Tries: Ron Coote, Russell Fairfax; Goals: John Brass (3/5)	Attendance: 23,005; Referee: Gary Cook

Sunday 13 June	Manly-Warringah Sea Eagles	20 – 9	Cronulla-Sutherland Sharks	Brookvale Oval, Sydney
	Tries: Mick Waller (2), Phil Lowe, Terry Randall; Goals: Graham Eadie (4/8)	[ Report]	Tries: Martin Raftery; Goals: Steve Rogers (3/4)	Attendance: 16,026; Referee: Don Macdonald

Sunday 20 June	Western Suburbs Magpies	15 – 37	Manly-Warringah Sea Eagles	Lidcombe Oval, Sydney
	Tries: John Donnelly, James Murphy, John Purcell; Goals: Ron Giteau (3)	[ Report]	Tries: Johnny Gibbs (2), Terry Randall (2), Graham Eadie, Bob Fulton, Terry Hill, Tom Mooney, Steve Norton; Goals: Graham Eadie (5)	Attendance: Greg Hartley; Referee: 12,713

Sunday 27 June	Manly-Warringah Sea Eagles	9 – 13	Canterbury-Bankstown Bulldogs	Brookvale Oval, Sydney
	Tries: Alan Thompson; Goals: Graham Eadie (3)	[ Report]	Tries: Steve Hage; Goals: Don Moseley (5)	Attendance: 15,446; Referee: Kevin Roberts

Saturday 3 July	St. George Dragons	13 – 5	Manly-Warringah Sea Eagles	Kogarah Oval, Sydney
	Tries: Ted Goodwin; Goals: Henry Tatana (5)	[ Report]	Tries: Tom Mooney; Goals: Graham Eadie (1)	Attendance: 10,388; Referee: Gary Cook

Sunday 11 July	Manly-Warringah Sea Eagles	10 – 14	Parramatta Eels	Brookvale Oval, Sydney
	Tries: Graham Eadie, Russel Gartner; Goals: Graham Eadie (2)	[ Report]	Tries: Neville Glover, Phil Mann; Goals: John Peard (4)	Attendance: 2,311; Referee: Don Macdonald

Saturday 17 July	North Sydney Bears	28 – 5	Manly-Warringah Sea Eagles	North Sydney Oval, Sydney
	Tries: John Miller; Goals: Barry Wood (1)	[ Report]	Tries: Bob Fulton (2), Johnny Gibbs, Rod Jackson, Tom Mooney, Alan Thompson; Goals: Graham Eadie (5)	Attendance: 6,475; Referee: Richie Humphreys

Saturday 31 July	Penrith Panthers	16 – 15	Manly-Warringah Sea Eagles	Penrith Park, Sydney
	Tries: Glenn West (2), Terry Geary, Terry Quinn; Goals: Ken Wilson (2)	[ Report]	Tries: Russel Gartner, Johnny Gibbs, Rod Jackson; Goals: Mick Waller (3)	Attendance: 6,260; Referee: Greg Hartley

Sunday 8 August	Manly-Warringah Sea Eagles	20 – 12	Newtown Bluebags	Brookvale Oval, Sydney
	Tries: Bob Fulton, Russel Gartner, Phil Lowe, Alan Thompson; Goals: Bob Fulton (4)	[ Report]	Tries: Chris Dawson, Brian Plummer; Goals: Brian Robertson (3)	Attendance: 8,643; Referee: Keith Page

Saturday 15 August	Manly-Warringah Sea Eagles	26 – 3	South Sydney Rabbitohs	Brookvale Oval, Sydney
	Tries: Graham Eadie, Bob Fulton, Ian Martin, Tom Mooney; Goals: Graham Eadie (7)	[ Report]	Tries: John Berne; Goals:	Attendance: 10,532; Referee: Barry Bradstock

Sunday 22 August	Balmain Tigers	11 – 30	Manly-Warringah Sea Eagles	Leichhardt Oval, Sydney
	Tries: Greg Cox; Goals: Greg Cox (4)	[ Report]	Tries: Gary Stephens (2), Graham Eadie, Ian Martin, Tom Mooney, Alan Thompson; Goals: Graham Eadie (6)	Attendance: 17,360; Referee: Don Macdonald

== Finals ==
=== Major Semi-Final ===
Saturday 4 September	Manly-Warringah Sea Eagles	17 – 23	Parramatta Eels	Sydney Cricket Ground, Sydney
	Tries: Bob Fulton (2), Alan Thompson; Goals: Graham Eadie (4/6)	[ Report]	Tries: Graeme Atkins, Neville Glover, John Peard; Goals: John Peard (5/7); Mark Levy (2/2)	Attendance: 30,999; Referee: Greg Hartley

=== Preliminary final ===
Saturday 11 September	Manly-Warringah Sea Eagles	15 – 12	Canterbury-Bankstown Bulldogs	Sydney Cricket Ground, Sydney
	Tries: Bob Fulton, Russel Gartner; Goals: Graham Eadie (4/6); Field Goals: Bob Fulton (1)	[ Report]	Tries: Keith Harris, Bob McCarthy; Goals: Don Moseley (3/4)	Attendance: 31,381; Referee: Gary Cook

=== Grand final ===
Saturday 18 September

Manly-Warringah Sea Eagles	13 – 10	Parramatta Eels
Tries: Phil Lowe Goals: Graham Eadie (5/6)		Tries: Geoff Gerard; Jim Porter; Goals: John Peard (2/3)

Sydney Cricket Ground, Sydney
Attendance: 57,343
Referee: Gary Cook
Player of the Match: Graham Eadie

Manly-Warringah	Parramatta

FB	1	Graham Eadie
LW	2	Tom Mooney
CE	3	Russel Gartner
CE	4	Bob Fulton (c)
RW	5	Rod Jackson
FE	6	Alan Thompson
HB	7	Gary Stephens
LK	8	Ian Martin
SR	9	Phil Lowe
SR	10	Steve Norton
PR	11	Terry Randall
HK	12	Max Krilich
PR	13	John Harvey
Substitutions:
IC	14	Gary Thoroughgood
IC	17	Mark Willoughby
Coach:
(Australia) Frank Stanton

FB	1	Mark Levy
LW	2	Jim Porter
CE	3	Ed Sulkowicz
CE	4	John Moran
RW	5	Neville Glover
FE	6	John Peard
HB	7	John Kolc
LK	8	Ray Price
SR	9	Geoff Gerard
SR	10	Ray Higgs (c)
PR	11	Denis Fitzgerald
HK	12	Ron Hilditch
PR	13	Graham Olling
Substitutions:
IC	14	John Baker
IC	15	Graeme Atkins
Coach:
(Australia) Terry Fearnley

== Player statistics ==
Note: Games and (sub) show total games played, e.g. 1 (1) is 2 games played.

Player	Games (sub)	Tries	Goals	FG	Points
(Australia) Ian Baker					
(Australia) Ray Branighan		3	4		17
(Australia) Peter Byrne					
(Australia) Graham Eadie		9	103		233
(Australia) Laurie Freier					
(Australia) Bob Fulton (c)		21	4	1	72
(Australia) Russel Gartner		5			15
(Australia) Johnny Gibbs		4			12
(Australia) John Harvey		1			3
(Australia) Terry Hill		1			3
(Australia) Rod Jackson		8			24
(Australia) Max Krilich		3			9
(England) Phil Lowe		7			21
(Australia) Ian Martin		5			15
(Australia) Tom Mooney		18			54
(England) Steve Norton		1			3
(Australia) Col Parkes		2			6
(Australia) Terry Randall		5			15
(England) Gary Stephens		2			6
(Australia) Alan Thompson		6			18
(Australia) Gary Thoroughgood		2			6
(Australia) Mick Waller		3	3		15
(Australia) Mark Willoughby					
(Australia) Brian Wilson					
TOTAL		105	114	1	544

== Representative Players ==
=== State ===
- New South Wales – Graham Eadie, Terry Randall

=== City vs Country ===
- City Firsts – Graham Eadie, Max Krilich, Terry Randall
