= List of Manly Warringah Sea Eagles honours =

Counted amongst the honours achieved by the Manly Warringah Sea Eagles since their first season in 1947 are eight 8 NRL Premierships and one World Club Challenge. The club's players and coaches have also received several individual awards.

== Media and Association Awards ==
Manly Warringah Sea Eagles
Rugby League Immortal	Bob Fulton (1981 – Original Inductee)
Team of the Century	Ken Irvine (Wing), Bob Fulton (Reserve)
ARL/NRL Hall of Fame	Ken Arthurson (Contributor), Kerry Boustead, Les Boyd, Roy Bull, Graham Eadie, Bob Fulton, Ken Irvine, Eddie Lumsden, Cliff Lyons, Steve Menzies, John O'Neill
NSWRL Hall of Fame	Bob Fulton, Ken Irvine
NSWRL Team of the Century	Ken Irvine (Wing), Bob Fulton (Five-Eight), Roy Bull (Reserve)
Country (CRL) Team of the Century	Eddie Lumsden (Wing), Bob Fulton (Five-Eight)
Illawarra Rugby League Team of the Century	Bob Fulton (Five-Eight), Kevin Schubert (Hooker), John Dorahy (Reserve)
Newcastle Rugby League Team of the Century	Eddie Lumsden (Wing)
Top 100 Players (Australia)	Kerry Boustead, Roy Bull, Graham Eadie, Bob Fulton, Ken Irvine, John O'Neill
Indigenous Rugby League Team of the Century	Dale Shearer (Wing), Cliff Lyons (Lock), Mal Cochrane (Hooker)
NSWRL State of Origin Greats	Noel Cleal (2nd Row), Michael O'Connor (Wing), Ian Roberts (Prop), Geoff Toovey (Halfback)
Queensland State of Origin All-Time Team	Paul Vautin (Reserve)
British Rugby League Hall of Fame	Mal Reilly
New Zealand Rugby League Legends Of League	Mark Broadhurst
Rothmans Medal	Graham Eadie (1974), Mal Cochrane (1986)
Dally M Awards	
Player of the Year	Cliff Lyons (1990, 1994), Matt Orford (2008), Tom Trbojevic (2021)
Silver Dally M	Ian Roberts (1993), Cliff Lyons (1995)
Best Fullback	Graham Eadie (1983), Matthew Ridge (1995), Tom Trbojevic (2021)
Best Winger	John Ribot (1982), Kerry Boustead (1983), Reuben Garrick (2021)
Best Centre	Michael O'Connor (1987, 1988), Jamie Lyon (2010, 2011, 2013, 2014)
Best Five-Eight	Cliff Lyons (1990, 1994)
Best Halfback	Matt Orford (2008), Daly Cherry-Evans (2014)
Best Lock Forward	Des Hasler (1991), Steve Menzies (2002), Ben Kennedy (2005, 2006)
Best Second Rower	Paul Vautin (1983), Noel Cleal (1984, 1986), Steve Menzies (1994, 1995, 1998), Anthony Watmough (2007, 2009), Glenn Stewart (2008)
Best Hooker	Mal Cochrane (1986, 1987), Jim Serdaris (1996), Geoff Toovey (1999)
Best Prop Forward	Dave Brown (1983), Martin Bella (1990), Ian Roberts (1993, 1994)
Top Try-Scorer	Bob Fulton (1972, 1973, 1976), Kevin Junee (1974), Russel Gartner (1977), Tom Mooney (1979), Phil Blake (1983, 1986), Steve Menzies (1995), Terry Hill (1997 - ARL), Brett Stewart (2008), David Williams (2013)
Top Points Scorer	Ron Rowles (1951, 1952, 1953, 1954), Graham Eadie (1974, 1975, 1976), Matthew Ridge (1995), Reuben Garrick (2021)
Rookie of the Year	Phil Blake (1982), Jack Elsegood (1993), Steve Menzies (1994), Daly Cherry-Evans (2011)
Captain of the Year	Ben Kennedy (2006), Jason King (2012), Jamie Lyon (2012, 2014)
Coach of the Year	Bob Fulton (1983)
Dave Brown Medal*	Dennis Ward (1972), Bob Fulton (1973), Graham Eadie (1976, 1978)
Clive Churchill Medal	Cliff Lyons (1987), Geoff Toovey (1996), Brent Kite (2008), Glenn Stewart (2011), Daly Cherry-Evans (2013)
Rugby League Week Player of the Year	John Mayes (1973), Bob Fulton (1975), Phil Sigsworth (1983), Cliff Lyons (1994)
Norwich Rising Star – Rookie of the Year	Jack Elsegood (1993), John Hopoate (1995)
Rugby League Players Association	
Players’ Player	Ben Kennedy (2006), Tom Trbojevic (2021)
Best Country Player	Brent Kite (2006)
Rookie Of The Year	David Williams (2008)
Clubman Of The Year	Jason King (2008)
New Zealand Player of the Year	Darrell Williams (1989), Kieran Foran (2013)
NSW Player of the Year	Roy Bull (1954), Bob Fulton (1972, 1973)
Sun Herald Best and Fairest	Rex Mossop (1958), Dennis Ward (1968)
Ken Stephen Memorial Award	Ian Roberts (1994), Michael Monaghan (2006)

* No longer awarded. Replaced by the Clive Churchill Medal in 1986

== Club honours ==
Manly Warringah Sea Eagles
Clubman of the Year	Owen Cunningham (1994), Cliff Lyons (1995), Des Hasler (1996), Geoff Toovey (1997), Craig Hancock (1998), Steve Menzies (1999, 2002), Chad Randall (2003), Albert Torrens (2004), Luke Williamson (2005), Chris Hicks (2006), Michael Monaghan (2007), Mark Bryant (2008), George Rose (2010), Michael Robertson (2011) Joe Galuvao (2012), Brett Stewart (2013), Brenton Lawrence (2014, 2016), Josh Starling (2015), Jake Trbojevic (2017), Joel Thompson (2018), Glenn Moore (2019), Lachlan Croker (2024)
Best and Fairest	Steve Menzies (2002), Chris Hicks (2004), Ben Kennedy (2005, 2006), Glenn Stewart (2007, 2008, 2011), Jason King (2009, 2010), Matt Ballin (2012), Anthony Watmough (2013), Brenton Lawrence (2014), Jake Trbojevic (2015, 2018, 2019), Tom Trbojevic (2016, 2021, 2024), Daly Cherry-Evans (2017, 2020, 2023), Lachlan Croker (2022)
Players’ Player	John Hopoate (2002), Ben Kennedy (2005), Brent Kite (2006), Brett Stewart (2007, 2015), Brent Kite (2008), George Rose (2009) Jamie Lyon (2010, 2012), Steve Matai (2011), Daly Cherry-Evans (2013), Kieran Foran (2014), Jake Trbojevic (2016, 2017), Joel Thompson (2018, 2019), Tom Trbojevic (2024)
Rookie of the Year	Jason King (2002), Steve Matai (2005), Travis Burns (2006), Michael Bani (2007), David Williams (2008), Kieran Foran (2009), Trent Hodkinson (2010), Daly Cherry-Evans (2011), Jorge Taufua (2012), Peta Hiku (2013), Jesse Sene-Lefao (2014), Tom Trbojevic (2015), Addin Fonua-Blake (2016), Brian Kelly (2017), Reuben Garrick (2019), Lehi Hopoate (2024)
Members Best and Fairest	Ben Kennedy (2005, 2006), Brett Stewart (2007, 2014, 2015), Anthony Watmough (2007, 2009), Matt Orford (2008), Jamie Lyon (2010, 2012), Kieran Foran (2011), Daly Cherry-Evans (2013, 2018, 2024), Jake Trbojevic (2016, 2017, 2019)

== Representative Players ==
Below are the players to play representative football whilst in Manly colours. Notable Internationals to play for Manly, but not represent from the club, include New Zealand players Jock Butterfield, Trevor Kilkelly, Adrian Shelford and Tasesa Lavea, and Great Britain players Mal Reilly, Phil Lowe, Steve Norton, Andy Goodway, Kevin Ward and Welsh dual rugby international John Devereux.

Manly Warringah Sea Eagles
Australian Test Players	**68** – Martin Bella, Johnny Bliss, Kerry Boustead, Les Boyd, Bill Bradstreet, Dave Brown, Ray Brown, Roy Bull, Peter Burke, Mark Carroll, Daly Cherry-Evans, Noel Cleal, Chris Close, Phil Daley, Bill Delamare, Graham Eadie, Bob Fulton, Daniel Gartner, Russel Gartner, Geoff Gerard, Johnny Gibbs, David Gillespie, Bill Hamilton, Les Hanigan, Des Hasler, Terry Hill, John Hopoate, Fred Jones, Ben Kennedy, Brent Kite, Nik Kosef, Max Krilich, Jack Lumsden, Jamie Lyon, Cliff Lyons, John McDonald, Paul McCabe, Steve Martin, Steve Menzies, Danny Moore, John Morgan, Rex Mossop, Wally O'Connell, Michael O'Connor, John O'Neill, Josh Perry, Terry Randall, John Ribot, Ray Ritchie, Ian Roberts, Kevin Schubert, Dale Shearer, Jack Sinclair, Frank Stanton, Brett Stewart, Glenn Stewart, Alan Thompson, Ian Thomson, Geoff Toovey, Jake Trbojevic, Tom Trbojevic, Paul Vautin, Mick Veivers, Bruce Walker, Dennis Ward, Anthony Watmough, David Williams, Tony Williams and Gordon Willoughby.
Australian Captains	**2** – Max Krilich (1982–83) and Geoff Toovey (1996)
New Zealand Test Players	**14** – Mark Broadhurst, Lewis Brown, Addin Fonua-Blake, Kieran Foran, Peta Hiku, Kevin Iro, Tony Iro, Steve Matai, Gene Ngamu, Matthew Ridge, Martin Taupau, Jared Waerea-Hargreaves, Dean Whare and Darrell Williams.
New Zealand Captains	**2** – Matthew Ridge (1995) and Kieran Foran (2013)
Other Nations Test Players	**31** – Josh Aloiai (Samoa), Nick Bradley-Qalilawa (Fiji), Gordon Chan Kum Tong (Samoa), Manase Fainu (Tonga), Addin Fonua-Blake (Tonga), Pita Godinet (Samoa), Solomon Haumono (Tonga), John Hopoate (Tonga), Lehi Hopoate (Tonga), Craig Innes (Rest of the World), Brent Kite (Tonga), Apisai Koroisau (Fiji), Toluta'u Koula (Tonga), Mark Lennon (Wales), Dunamis Lui (Samoa), Feleti Mateo (Tonga), Vic Mauro (Italy), Caleb Navale (Fiji), Haumole Olakau'atu (Tonga), Taniela Paseka (Tonga), Michael Robertson (Scotland), Josh Schuster (Samoa), Jesse Sene-Lefao (Samoa), Martin Taupau (Samoa), Jorge Taufua (Tonga / Samoa), Jazz Tevaga (Samoa), Christian Tuipulotu (Tonga), Akuila Uate (Fiji), Siosaia Vave (Tonga), Brayden Wiliame (Fiji), Matthew Wright (Samoa).
Tongan Captains	**1** – Brent Kite (2013)
State Of Origin (NSW)	**38** – Les Boyd, Ray Brown, Jamie Buhrer, Mark Carroll, Noel Cleal, Phil Daley, Graham Eadie, Geoff Gerard, David Gillespie, Craig Hancock, Des Hasler, Terry Hill, John Hopoate, William Hopoate, Ben Kennedy, Jason King, Brent Kite, Nik Kosef, Max Krilich, Jamie Lyon, Cliff Lyons, Steve Martin, Steve Menzies, Michael O'Connor, Haumole Olakau'atu, Ian Roberts, Jim Serdaris, Phil Sigsworth, Brett Stewart, Glenn Stewart, Alan Thompson, Geoff Toovey, Jake Trbojevic, Tom Trbojevic, Dylan Walker, Anthony Watmough, David Williams and Tony Williams.
NSW State of Origin Captains	**3** – Max Krilich (1982–83), Geoff Toovey (1997) and Jake Trbojevic (2024)
State Of Origin (QLD)	**16** – Matt Ballin, Steven Bell, Martin Bella, Kerry Boustead, Dave Brown, Daly Cherry-Evans, Chris Close, Owen Cunningham, Paul McCabe, Danny Moore, Nate Myles, John Ribot, Dale Shearer, Neil Tierney, Paul Vautin and Bruce Walker.
Qld State of Origin Captains	**2** – Paul Vautin (1988, 1990), Daly Cherry-Evans (2019–2025)
State Of Residence (NSW)	**35** – Johnny Bliss, Les Boyd, Bill Bradstreet, Ray Branighan, John Bucknall, Peter Burke, Roy Bull, Gary Collins, Bill Delamare, Lindsay Drake, Graham Eadie, Bob Fulton, Russel Gartner, Johnny Gibbs, Bill Hamilton, Les Hanigan, George Hunter, Fred Jones, Steve Martin, John McDonald, John Morgan, Rex Mossop, Wally O'Connell, Terry Randall, Ray Ritchie, Kevin Schubert, Jack Sinclair, Frank Stanton, Alec Tennant, Allan Thomson, Ian Thomson, Mick Veivers, Dennis Ward, Gordon Willoughby, Ron Willey
Prime Minister's XIII	**21** – Brett Stewart (2006), Matt Orford (2006), Michael Robertson (2009), David Williams (2009), Glenn Stewart (2009), George Rose (2009), Tony Williams (2010), Chris Bailey (2010), Brenton Lawrence (2014), Jake Trbojevic (2015, 2016, 2017, 2018, 2019, 2023), Tom Symonds (2015), Tom Trbojevic (2017), Api Koroisau (2017), Dylan Walker (2017), Brian Kelly (2018), Daly Cherry-Evans (2018, 2022, 2023), Brad Parker (2019), Reuben Garrick (2019, 2024), Luke Brooks (2024), Ethan Bullemor (2024), Jason Saab (2025)

Below are Manly players that have represented Australia at the schoolboys level.

- Players in **bold** went on to make their first grade debut for Manly Warringah.
- Players in Italics currently playing for Manly Warringah
- Players with a * still playing NRL or Super League but no longer with Manly Warringah

Updated 19 October 2024

Manly Warringah Sea Eagles
**Australian Schoolboys**	**45** – Cheyse Blair, **Phil Blake**, Les Boyd, Luke Brooks, Mark Bryant, **Michael Chee-Kam**, **Mal Cochrane**, Cameron Cullen, Luke Dorn, **Jack Elsegood**, **Kieran Foran**, Liam Foran, **Reuben Garrick**, Blake Green, **Clint Gutherson***, Jackson Hastings*, **Solomon Haumono**, Daniel Heckenberg, **William Hopoate**, **Sean Keppie***, Brent Kite, Brenton Lawrence, Heath L'Estrange, Jamie Lyon, **Joey Lussick***, Feleti Mateo, Kevin McGuinness, **Steve Menzies**, Jamie Olejnik, Lloyd Perrett, Brendon Reeves, **James Roumanos**, **David Ronson**, Jason Saab, Ian Schubert, **Paul Shaw**, Curtis Sironen*, Tommy Talau, Martin Taupau*, **Jake Trbojevic**, Akuila Uate, Ben Walker, Dylan Walker*, Frank Winterstein, Matthew Wright.

== All-Time Greatest Teams ==
In recent times the Manly Warringah Sea Eagles Football Club has recognised their players, past and present, with teams announced to reflect the best squads up to that point. The 2006 Dream Team selectors featured ex-Manly Warringah secretary Ken Arthurson (the Godfather of Manly), respected League writer Ian Heads, MWRLFC Chairman Kerry Sibraa and journalist Phil Rothfield.

Official Greatest Teams
	1990	2006
Full Back	Graham Eadie	Graham Eadie
Winger	Tom Mooney	Ken Irvine
Winger	Les Hanigan	Michael O'Connor
Centre	Michael O'Connor	Ray Branighan
Centre	Bob Fulton	Bob Fulton
Five-Eighth	Wally O'Connell	Wally O'Connell
Halfback	Des Hasler	Geoff Toovey
Lock Forward	Malcolm "Mal" Reilly	Malcolm "Mal" Reilly
Second Row	Terry Randall	Terry Randall
Second Row	Phil Lowe	Steve Menzies
Front Row	Roy Bull	Roy Bull
Hooker	Max Krilich	Max Krilich
Front Row	John O'Neill	John O'Neill
Reserve	Ian Martin	Des Hasler
Reserve	Alan Thompson	Ben Kennedy
Reserve	Steve Norton	Cliff Lyons
Reserve	John McDonald	Paul Vautin
Coach	-	Frank Stanton
Team Manager	-	Ken Arthurson

== Centenary Honours ==
Manly Warringah Sea Eagles
ARL Team Of The Century	Ken Irvine (Wing), Bob Fulton (Reserve)
ARL 100 Greatest Players	Kerry Boustead, Roy Bull, Graham Eadie, Bob Fulton, Ken Irvine, Eddie Lumsden, John O'Neill
Country Rugby League Team of the Century	Eddie Lumsden (Wing), Bob Fulton (5/8)
Illawarra Rugby League Team of the Century	Bob Fulton (5/8), Kevin Schubert (Hooker), John Dorahy (Reserve)
Indigenous Team of the Century	Dale Shearer (Wing), Mal Cochrane (Hooker), Cliff Lyons (Lock)
Newcastle Rugby League Team of the Century	Eddie Lumsden (Wing)
NSWRL Team of the Century	Ken Irvine (Wing), Bob Fulton (5/8), Roy Bull (Reserve)
Secondary Schools Centenary Team	Steve Menzies (2nd Row), Les Boyd (Front Row), Ian Schubert (Reserve)

== Premiership Honours ==
=== Premierships (8/73) ===
Year	Opponent	Competition	Score	Venue	Attendance
1972	Eastern Suburbs Roosters	NSWRFL	19–14	Sydney Cricket Ground	54,537
1973	Cronulla-Sutherland Sharks	NSWRFL	10–7	Sydney Cricket Ground	52,044
1976	Parramatta Eels	NSWRFL	13–10	Sydney Cricket Ground	57,343
1978	Cronulla-Sutherland Sharks	NSWRFL	16–0	Sydney Cricket Ground	33,552*
1987	Canberra Raiders	NSWRL	18–8	Sydney Cricket Ground	50,201
1996	St George Dragons	ARL	20–8	Sydney Football Stadium	40,985
2008	Melbourne Storm	NRL	40–0**	ANZ Stadium	80,388
2011	New Zealand Warriors	NRL	24–10	ANZ Stadium	81,988

* This denotes the Grand Final replay. The original match was drawn 11-all and attracted 51,510 to the SCG.
** The 40–0 win over Melbourne in 2008 is the league record winning margin in a Grand Final.

=== Runners-up (11/73) ===
Year	Opponent	Competition	Score	Venue	Attendance
1951	South Sydney Rabbitohs	NSWRFL	14–42	Sydney Sports Ground	28,505
1957	St George Dragons	NSWRFL	9–31	Sydney Cricket Ground	54,399
1959	St George Dragons	NSWRFL	0–20	Sydney Cricket Ground	49,457
1968	South Sydney Rabbitohs	NSWRFL	9–13	Sydney Cricket Ground	54,255
1970	South Sydney Rabbitohs	NSWRFL	12–23	Sydney Cricket Ground	53,241
1982	Parramatta Eels	NSWRFL	8–21	Sydney Cricket Ground	52,186
1983	Parramatta Eels	NSWRFL	6–18	Sydney Cricket Ground	40,285
1995	Sydney Bulldogs	ARL	4–17	Sydney Football Stadium	41,127
1997	Newcastle Knights	ARL	16–22	Sydney Football Stadium	42,482
2007	Melbourne Storm*	NRL	8–34	ANZ Stadium	81,392
2013	Sydney Roosters	NRL	18–26	ANZ Stadium	81,491

* Melbourne Storm were stripped of their 2007 premiership win in 2010 following major salary cap breaches by the club. The NRL lists no premiers for the season.

=== Minor Premierships (9/73) ===
Year	Competition	Wins	Draws	Losses	PF	PA
1971	NSWRFL	19	0	3	528	260
1972	NSWRFL	18	1	3	460	255
1973	NSWRFL	17	1	4	500	226
1976	NSWRFL	16	0	6	499	252
1983	NSWRFL	22	0	4	690	361
1987	NSWRL	18	0	5	553	356
1995	ARL	20	0	2	687	248
1996	ARL	18	0	4	549	191
1997	ARL	15	0	5	521	366

=== World Club Challenges (1/3) ===
Year	Opponent	Result	Score	Venue	Attendance
1987	Wigan	Loss	2–8	Central Park	36,895
2009	Leeds Rhinos	Win	28–20	Elland Road	32,569
2012	Leeds Rhinos	Loss	12–26	Headingley Carnegie Stadium	21,062

* All games played in England

=== Wooden Spoons (0/75) ===
The Sea Eagles have never finished last in a season. They are the only pre-1982 club to have never finished with the wooden spoon.

=== Finals (46/75) ===
The Sea Eagles qualified for the NSWRL/ARL/NRL finals in the following years.
1951, 1955, 1957, 1958, 1959, 1961, 1966, 1968, 1970, 1971, 1972, 1973, 1974, 1975, 1976, 1977, 1978, 1981, 1982, 1983, 1984, 1986, 1987, 1988, 1990, 1991, 1993, 1994, 1995, 1996, 1997, 1998, 2005, 2006, 2007, 2008, 2009, 2010, 2011, 2012, 2013, 2014, 2017, 2019, 2021 and 2024.

== Premiership Teams ==
=== 1972 ===
No.

Position
Player

1 Graham Eadie – FB 2 Ken Irvine – WG 3 Ray Branighan – CE 4 Bob Fulton – CE 5 Max Brown – WG 6 Ian Martin – FE 7 Dennis Ward – HB 8 Mal Reilly – LK 9 Terry Randall – SR

No.

Position
Player

10 Allan Thomson – SR 11 John O'Neill – PR 12 Fred Jones – HK (c) 13 Bill Hamilton – PR CO Ron Willey – positions

=== 1973 ===
No.

Position
Player

1 Graham Eadie – FB 2 Ken Irvine – WG 3 Ray Branighan – CE 4 Bob Fulton – CE 5 Max Brown – WG 6 Ian Martin – FE 7 John Mayes – HB 8 Mal Reilly – LK 9 Terry Randall – SR

No.

Position
Player

10 Peter Peters – SR 11 John O'Neill – PR 12 Fred Jones – HK (c) 13 Bill Hamilton – PR 14 John Bucknall – positions CO Ron Willey – positions

=== 1976 ===
No.

Position
Player

1 Graham Eadie – FB 2 Tom Mooney – WG 3 Russel Gartner – CE 4 Bob Fulton – CE (c) 5 Rod Jackson – WG 6 Alan Thompson – FE 7 Gary Stephens – HB 8 Ian Martin – LK 9 Phil Lowe – SR

No.

Position
Player

10 Steve Norton – SR 11 Terry Randall – PR 12 Max Krilich – HK 13 John Harvey – PR 14 Gary Thoroughgood – positions 17 Mark Willoughby – positions CO Frank Stanton – positions

=== 1978 ===
No.

Position
Player

1 Graham Eadie – FB 2 Tom Mooney – WG 3 Stephen Knight – CE 4 Russel Gartner – CE 5 Simon Booth – WG 6 Alan Thompson – FE 7 Steve Martin – HB 8 Ian Martin – LK 9 Terry Randall – SR (vc)

No.

Position
Player

10 Bruce Walker – SR 11 John Harvey – PR 12 Max Krilich – HK (c) 13 Ian Thomson – PR 14 Wayne Springall – positions 16 Ray Branighan – positions CO Frank Stanton – positions

=== 1987 ===
No.

Position
Player

1 Dale Shearer – FB 2 David Ronson – WG 3 Darrell Williams – CE 4 Michael O'Connor – CE 5 Stuart Davis – WG 6 Cliff Lyons – FE 7 Des Hasler – HB 8 Paul Vautin – LK (c) 9 Noel Cleal – SR (vc)

No.

Position
Player

10 Ron Gibbs – SR 11 Kevin Ward – PR 12 Mal Cochrane – HK 13 Phil Daley – PR 20 Paul Shaw – positions 24 Mark Pocock – positions CO Bob Fulton – positions

=== 1996 ===
No.

Position
Player

1 Matthew Ridge – FB (vc) 2 Danny Moore – WG 3 Craig Innes – CE 4 Terry Hill – CE 5 John Hopoate – WG 13 Nik Kosef – FE 7 Geoff Toovey – HB (c) 17 David Gillespie – PR 9 Jim Serdaris – HK

No.

Position
Player

10 Mark Carroll – PR 11 Steve Menzies – SR 12 Daniel Gartner – SR 8 Owen Cunningham – LK 6 Cliff Lyons – positions 14 Neil Tierney – positions 16 Des Hasler – positions 19 Craig Hancock – positions CO Bob Fulton – positions

=== 2008 ===
No.

Position
Player

1 Brett Stewart – FB 2 Michael Robertson – WG 3 Steven Bell – CE 4 Steve Matai – CE 5 David Williams – WG 6 Jamie Lyon – FE (vc) 7 Matt Orford – HB (c) 8 Brent Kite – PR 9 Matt Ballin – HK

No.

Position
Player

10 Josh Perry – PR 11 Anthony Watmough – SR 12 Glenn Hall – SR 13 Glenn Stewart – LK 14 Heath L'Estrange – positions 15 Mark Bryant – positions 16 Jason King – positions 17 Steve Menzies – positions CO Des Hasler – positions

=== 2011 ===
No.

Position
Player

1 Brett Stewart – FB (vc) 2 Michael Robertson – WG 3 Jamie Lyon – CE (c) 4 Steve Matai – CE 5 William Hopoate – WG 6 Kieran Foran – FE 7 Daly Cherry-Evans – HB 8 Joe Galuvao – PR 9 Matt Ballin – HK

No.

Position
Player

10 Brent Kite – PR 11 Anthony Watmough – SR 12 Tony Williams – SR 13 Glenn Stewart – LK 14 Shane Rodney – positions 15 Jamie Buhrer – positions 16 Vic Mauro – positions 17 George Rose – positions CO Des Hasler – positions

== World Club Champions ==
=== 2009 ===
No.

Position
Player

1 Brett Stewart – FB 2 Michael Robertson – WG 3 Jamie Lyon – CE 4 Steve Matai – CE 5 David Williams – WG 6 Chris Bailey – FE 7 Matt Orford – HB (c) 8 Jason King – PR 9 Matt Ballin – HK

No.

Position
Player

10 Josh Perry – PR 11 Anthony Watmough – SR 12 Glenn Hall – SR 13 Glenn Stewart – LK 14 Heath L'Estrange – positions 15 Adam Cuthbertson – positions 16 George Rose – positions 18 Shane Rodney – positions CO Des Hasler – positions
