= 1976 NSWRFL season =

Rugby league competition

1976 New South Wales Rugby Football League
- Teams: 12
- Premiers: Manly-Warringah (3rd title)
- Minor premiers: Manly-Warringah (4th title)
- Matches played: 138
- Points scored: 4390
- Total attendance: 1,594,183
- Top points scorer: Graham Eadie (233)
- Wooden spoon: Newtown Jets (6th spoon)
- Rothmans Medal: Ray Higgs
- Top try-scorer: Bob Fulton (24)

The 1976 New South Wales Rugby Football League premiership was the 69th season of Sydney's professional rugby league football competition, Australia's first. Twelve teams, including six of 1908's foundation clubs and another six from around Sydney, competed for the J. J. Giltinan Shield and WD & HO Wills Cup during the season, which culminated in a grand final between the Manly-Warringah and Parramatta clubs. NSWRFL teams also competed for the 1976 Amco Cup.

== Season summary ==
This season Eastern Suburbs became the first rugby league team, and one of the first in Australian sport, to have a sponsor's name appear on their jersey.

Twenty-two regular season rounds were played from March till August resulting in a top five of Manly-Warringah, Parramatta, St. George, Eastern Suburbs and Canterbury-Bankstown, who battled it out in the finals.

In a one-off match that would form the foundation of the modern World Club Challenge, the previous season's premiers, Eastern Suburbs played British Champions St Helens R.F.C. on the 29th of June at the Sydney Cricket Ground. 26,865 turned out to see the Roosters beat the Saints 25 to 2.

This season Parramatta front-rower and captain Ray Higgs won both the Rothmans Medal and the Rugby League Week player of the year award.

The 1976 season also saw the retirement from the League of future Australian Rugby League Hall of Fame inductee, Graeme Langlands.

=== Teams ===
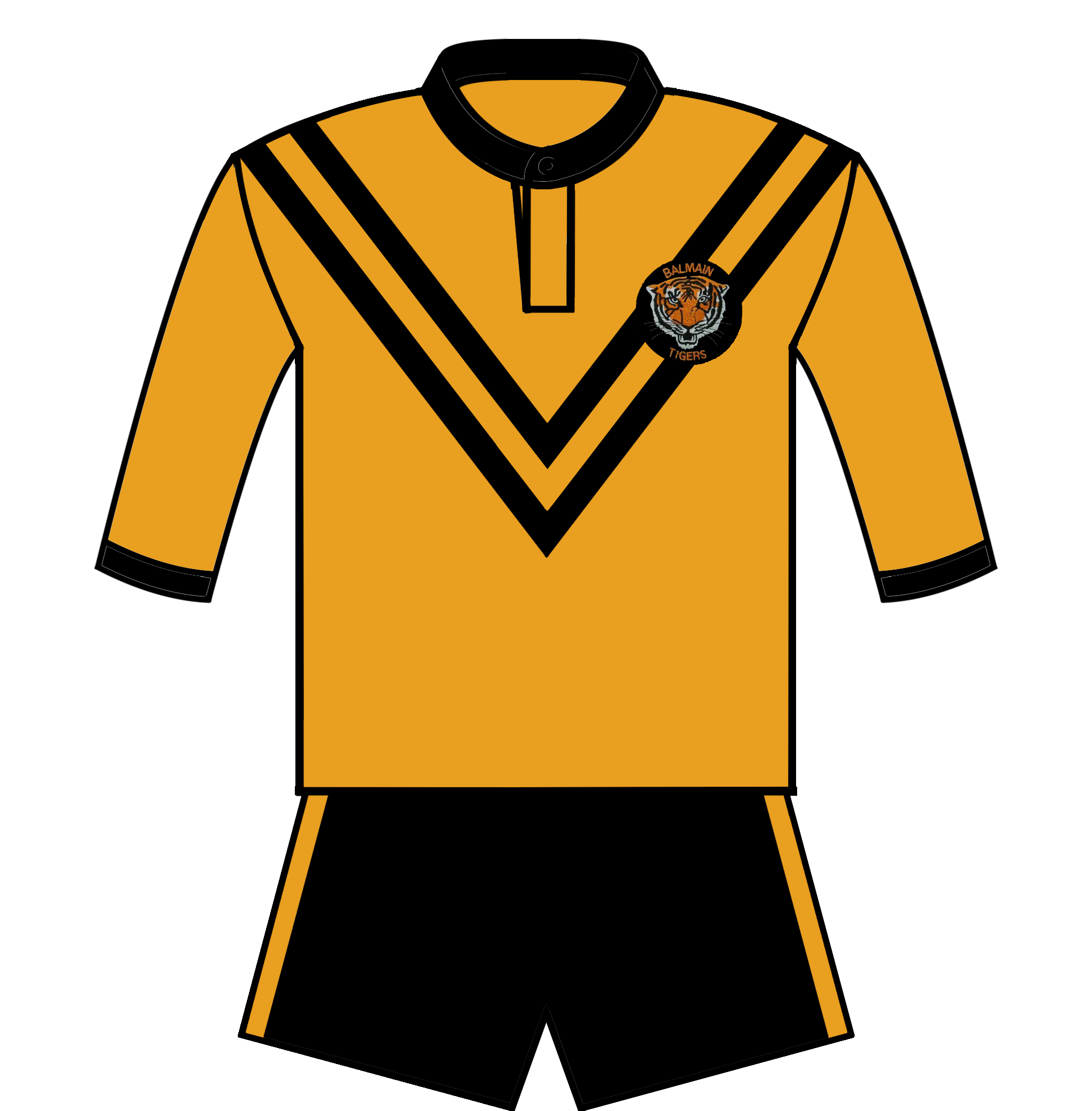
Balmain; Tigers 69th season Ground: Leichhardt Oval; Coach: Paul Broughton; Captain: Dennis Manteit

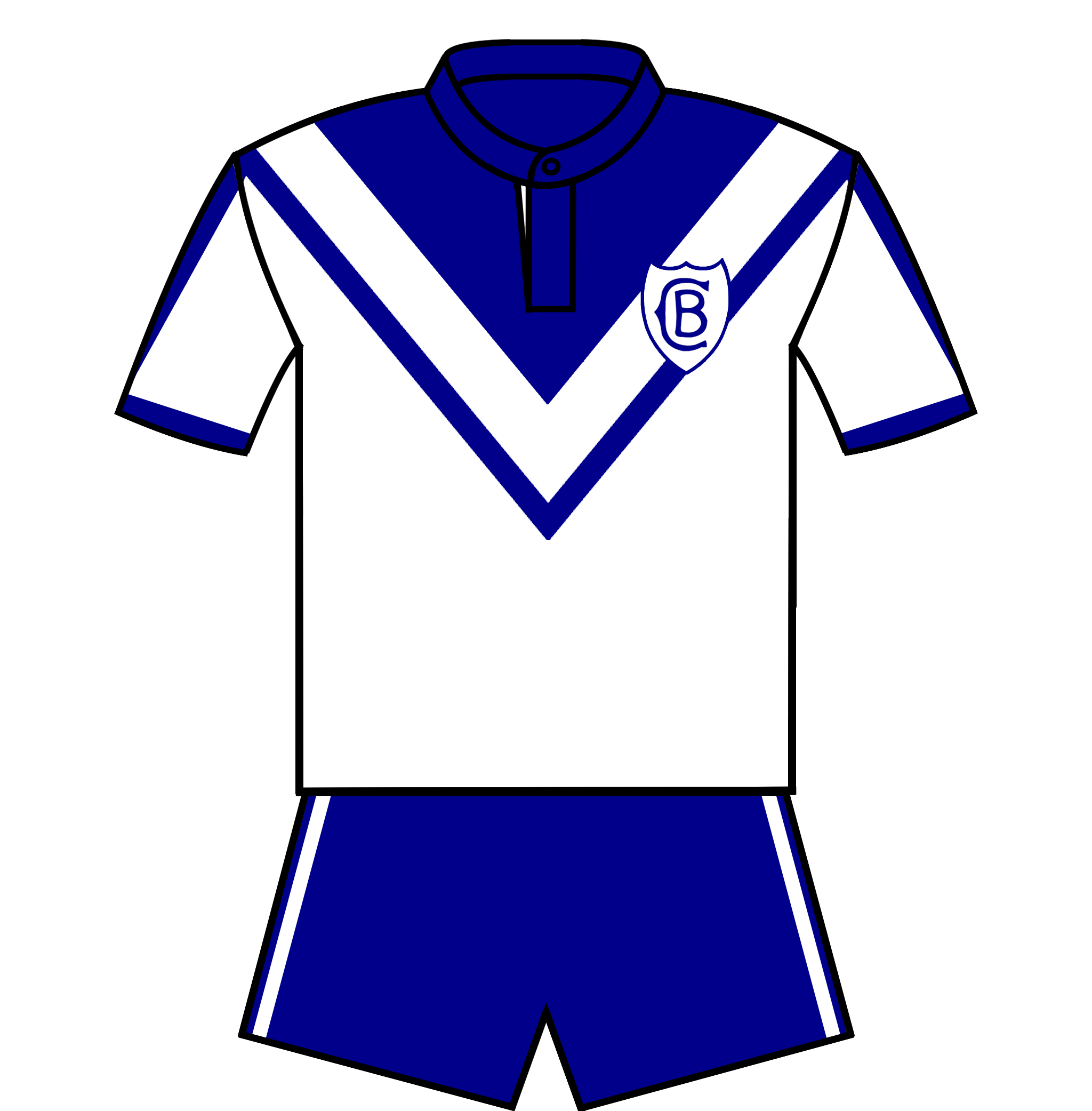
Canterbury-Bankstown 42nd season Ground: Belmore Sports Ground; Coach: Malcolm Clift; Captain: Tim Pickup

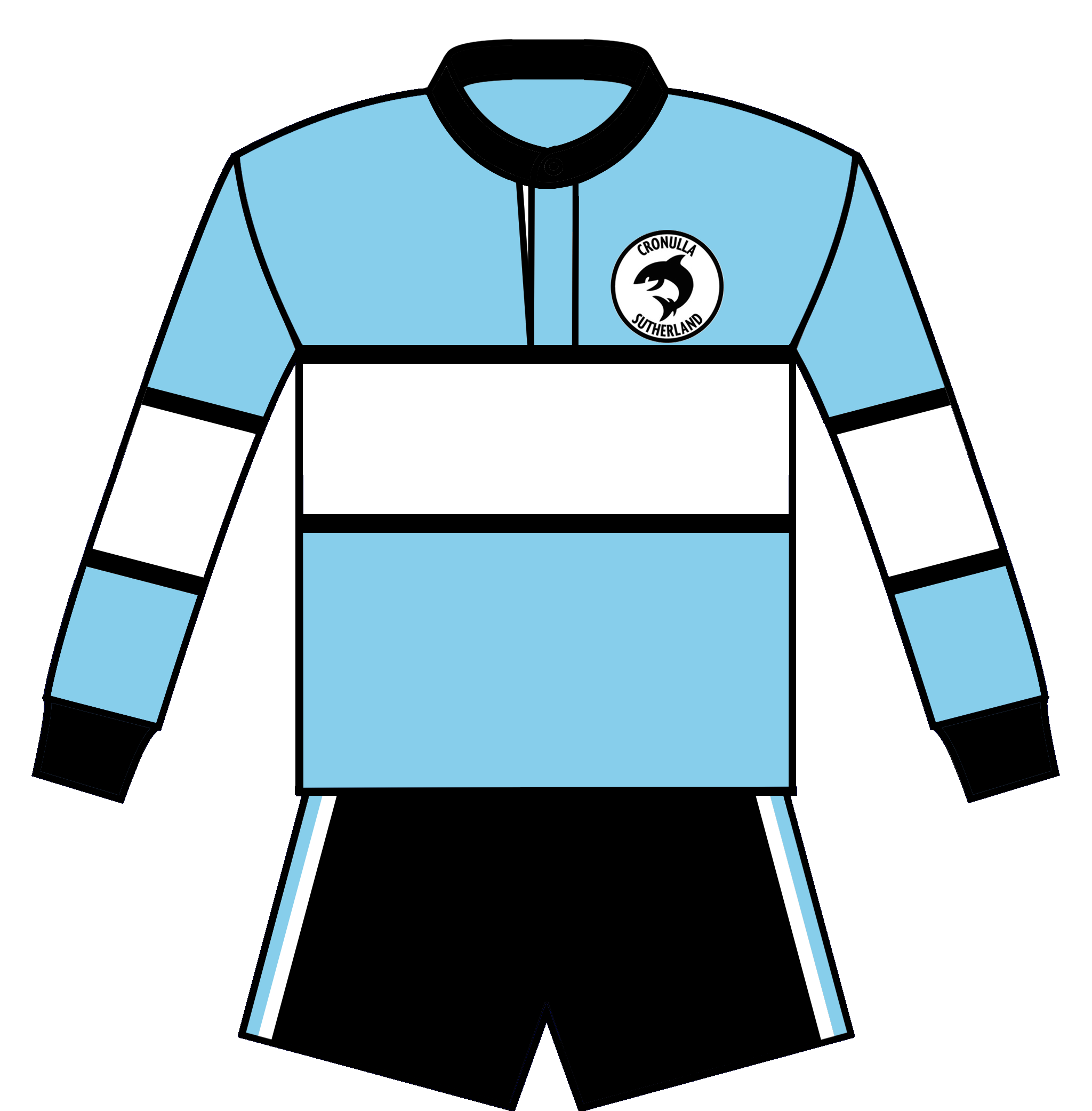
Cronulla-Sutherland; Sharks 10th season Ground: Endeavour Field; Coach: John Raper; Captain: Greg Pierce; Roger Millward

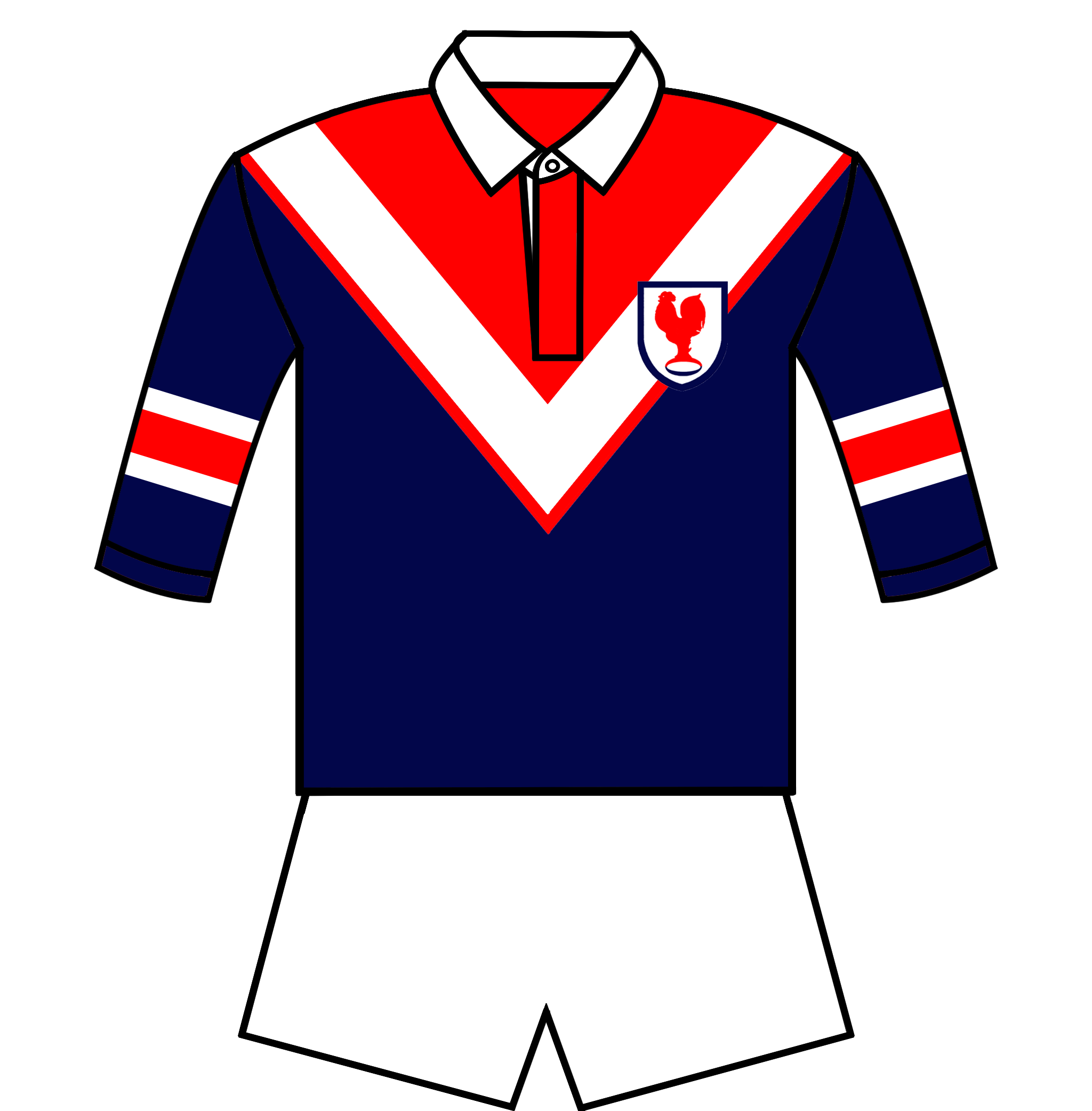
Eastern Suburbs; Roosters 69th season Ground: Sydney Sports Ground; Coach: Jack Gibson; Captain: Arthur Beetson

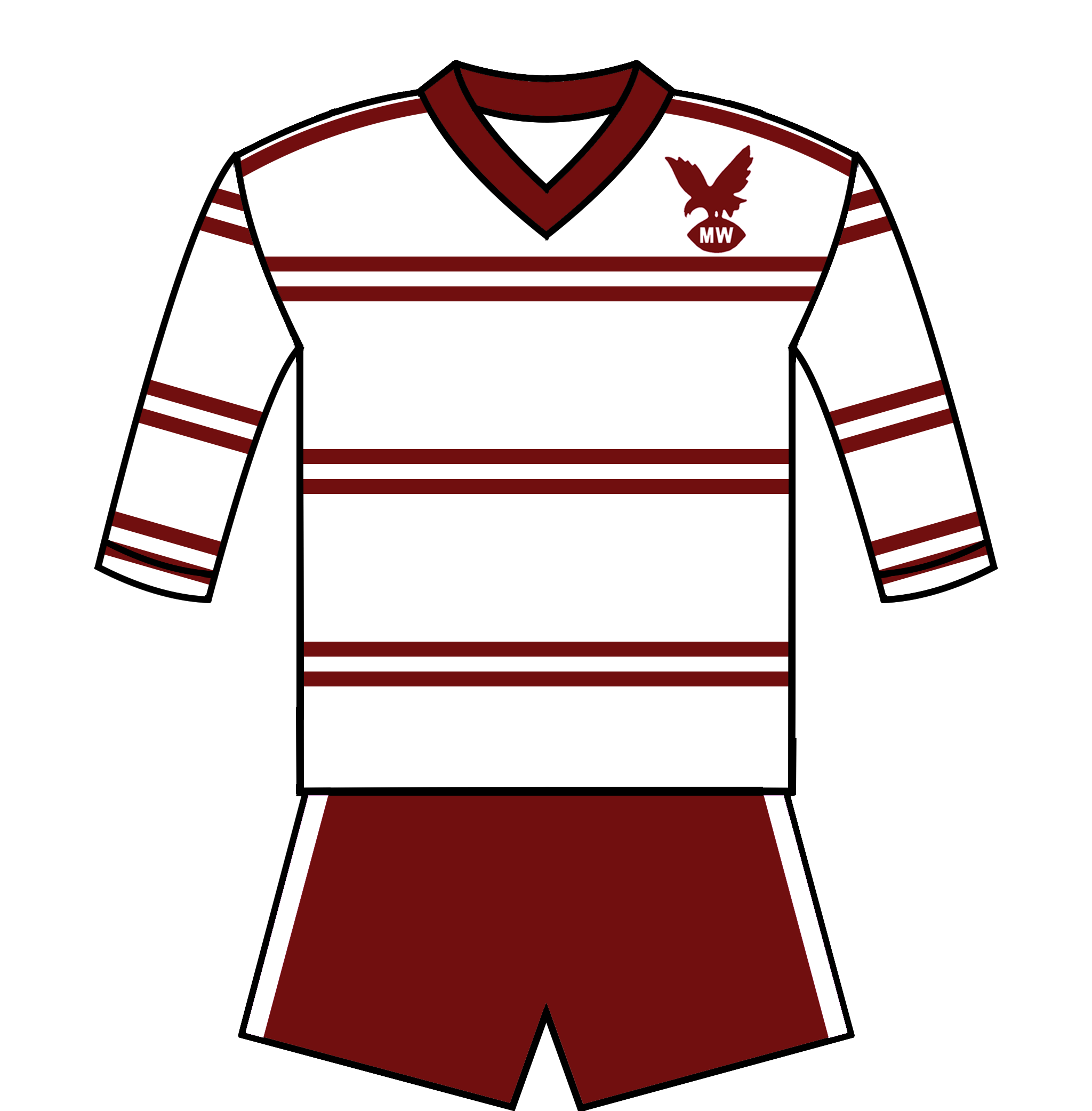
Manly-Warringah; Sea Eagles 30th season Ground: Brookvale Oval; Coach: Frank Stanton; Captain: Bob Fulton

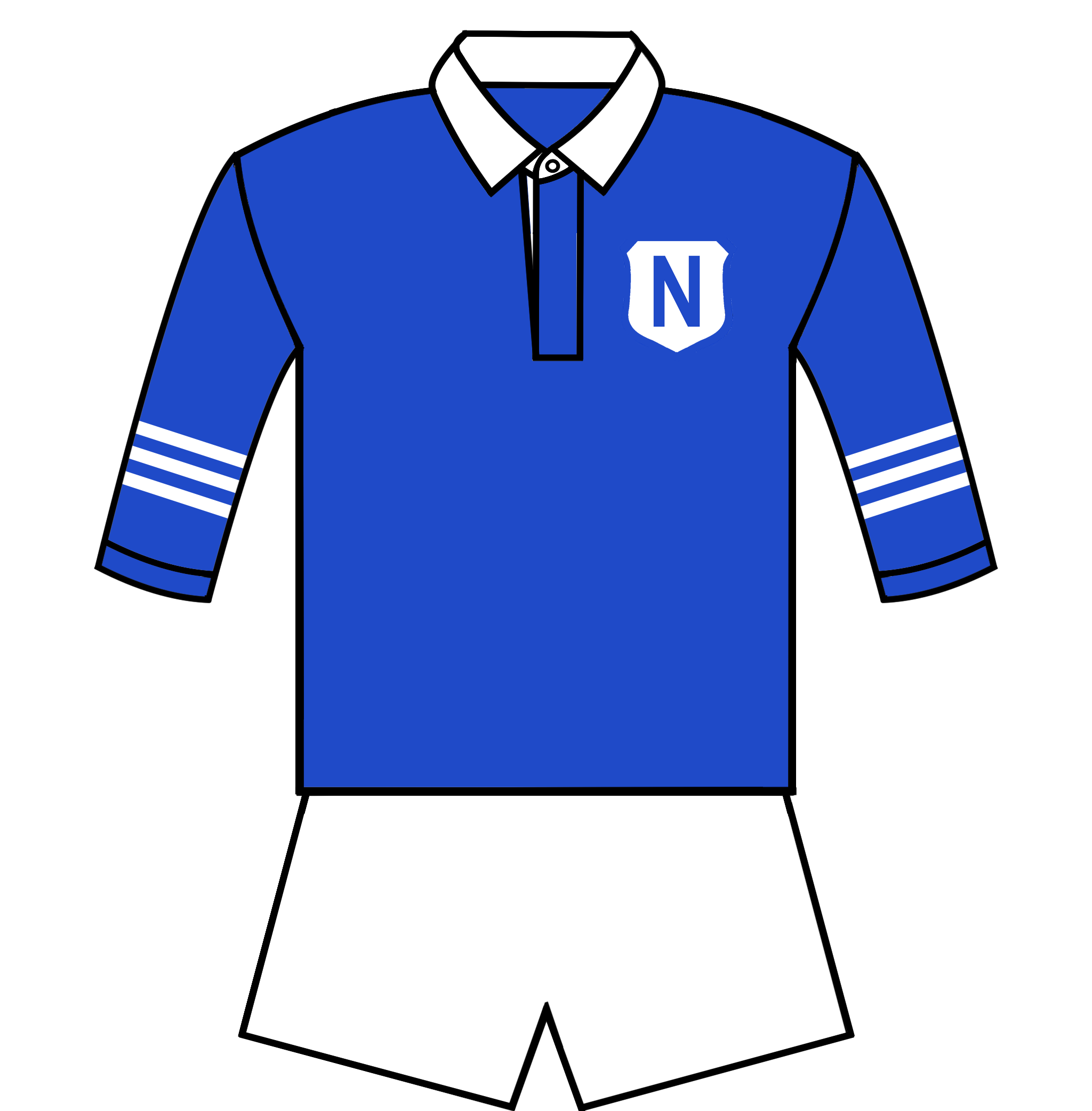
Newtown; Jets 69th season Ground: Henson Park; Coach: Clarrie Jeffries; Captain: John Floyd

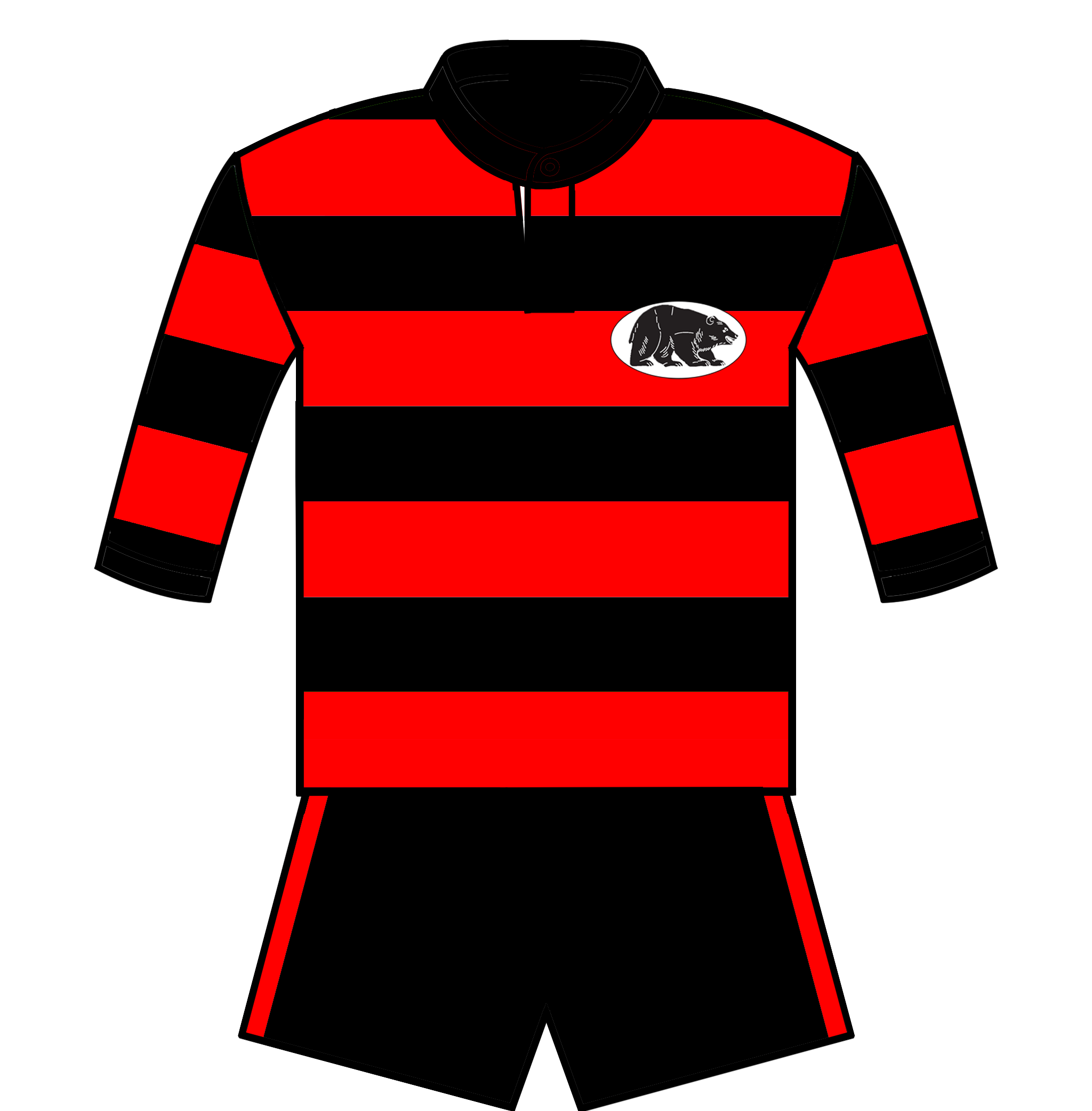
North Sydney; Bears 69th season Ground: North Sydney Oval; Coach: Noel Kelly; Captain: Bruce Walker

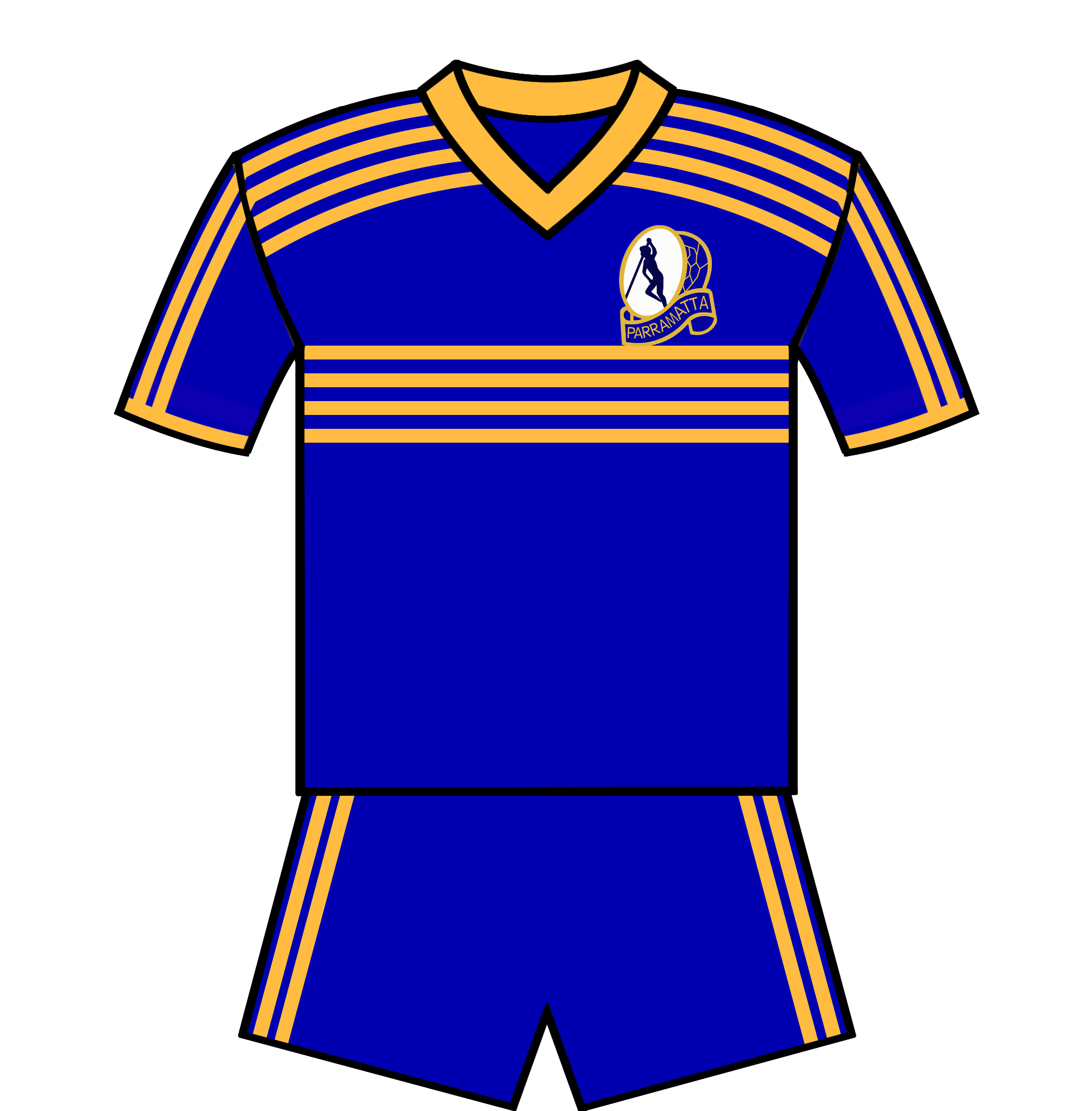
Parramatta; Eels 30th season Ground: Cumberland Oval; Coach: Terry Fearnley; Captain: Ray Higgs

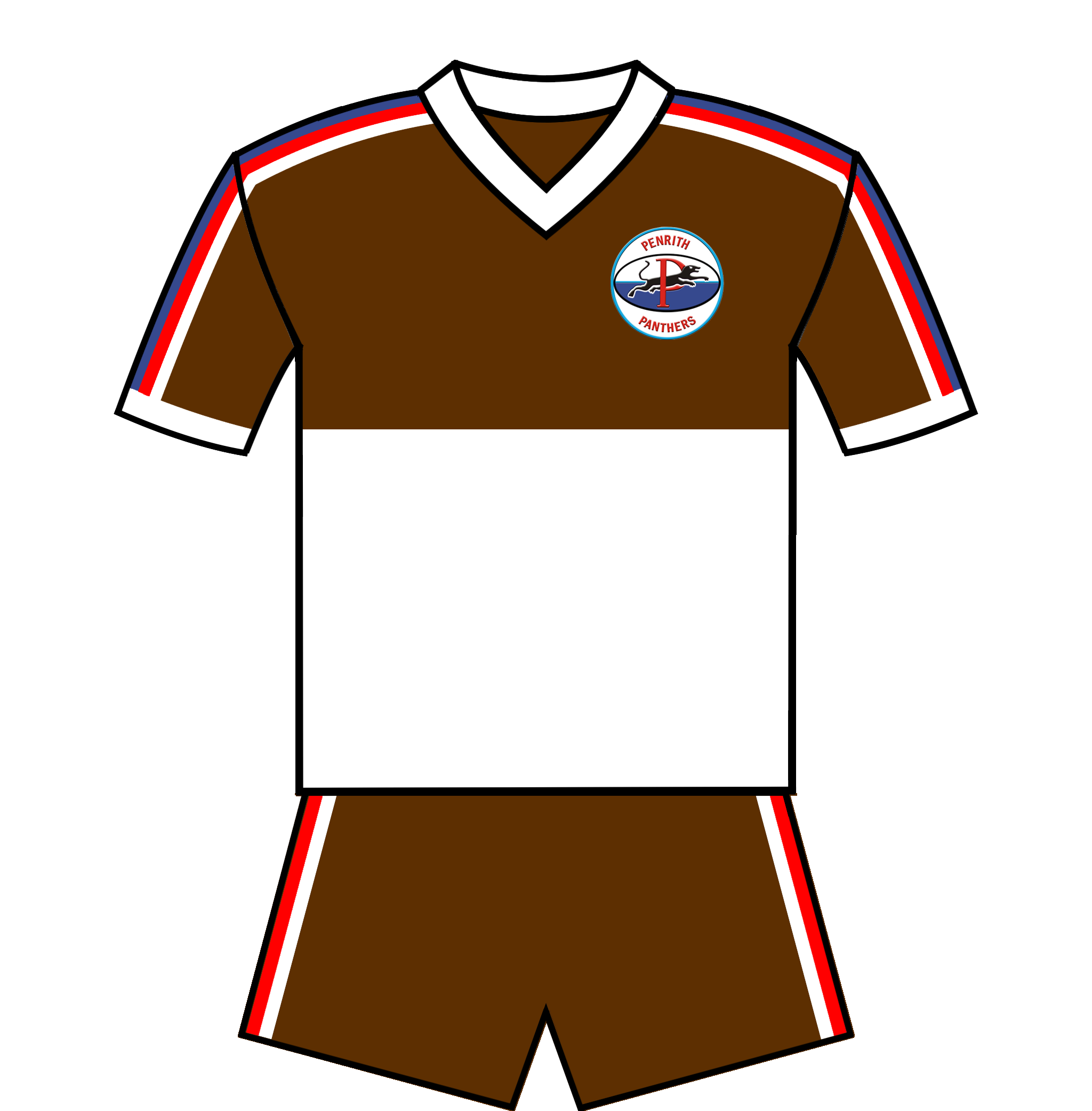
Penrith; Panthers 10th season Ground: Penrith Park; Coach: Barry Harris; Captain: Mike Stephenson

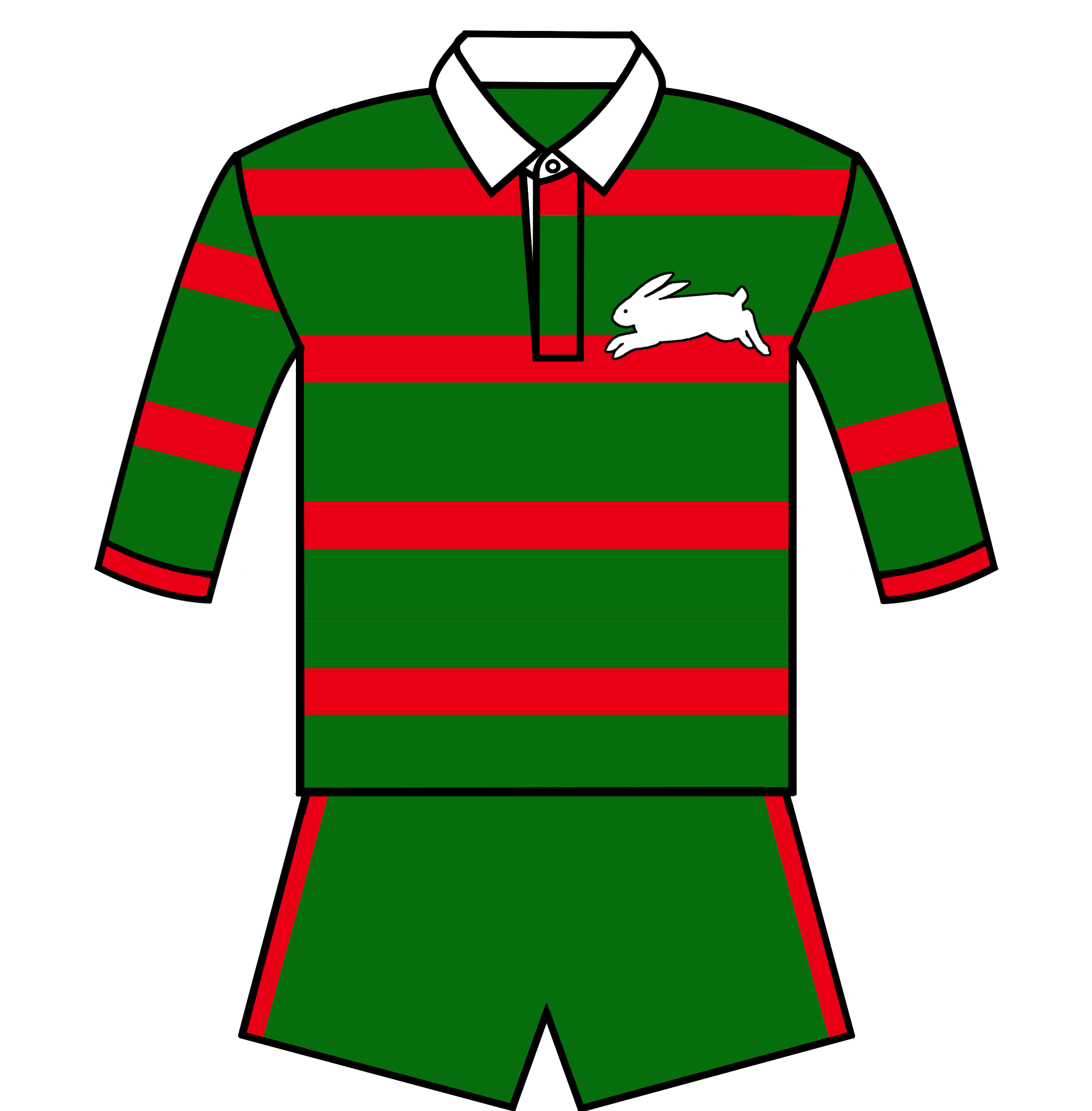
South Sydney; Rabbitohs 69th season Ground: Redfern Oval; Coach: Johnny King; Captain: Gary Stevens

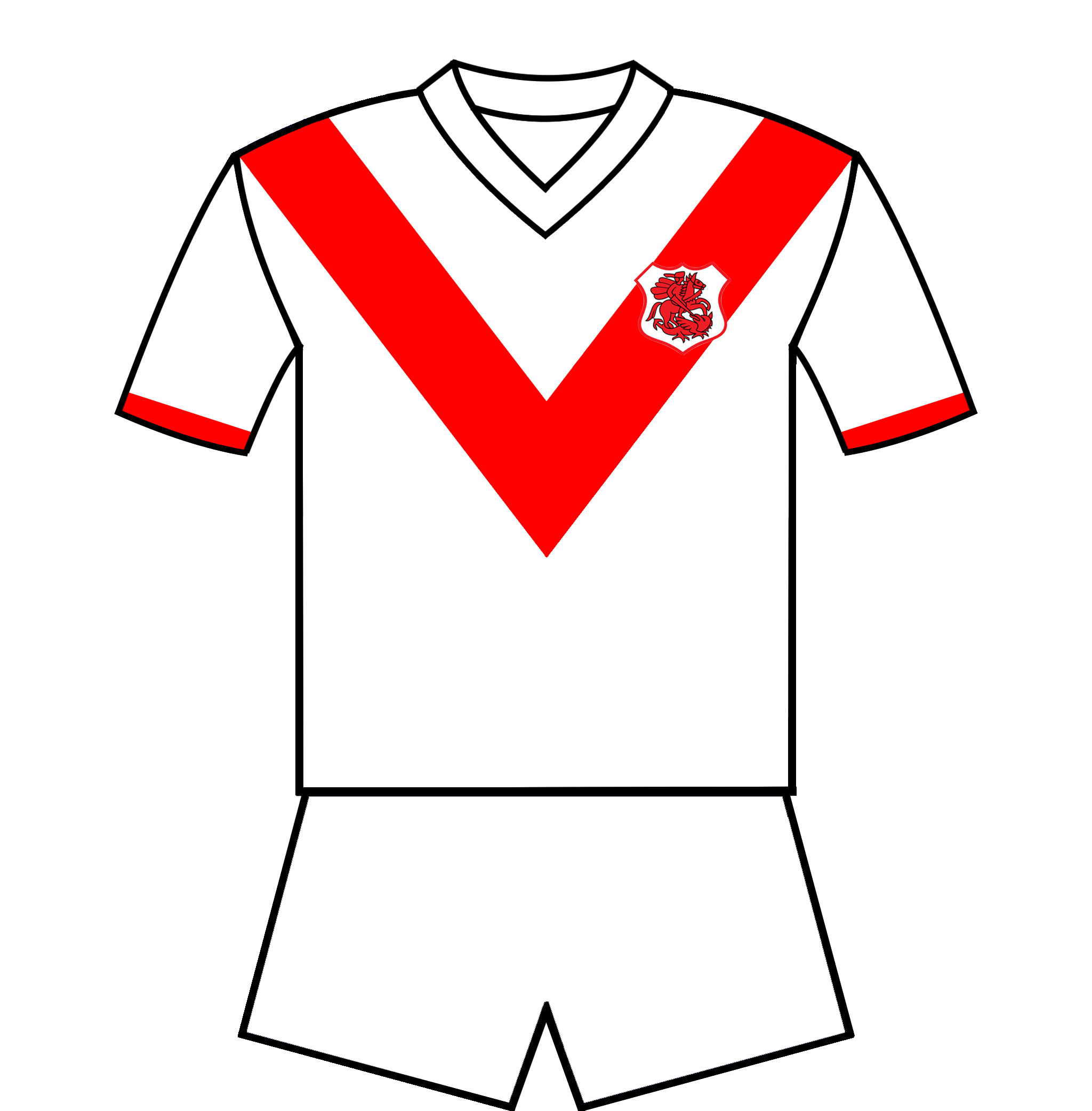
St. George; Dragons 56th season Ground: Jubilee Oval; Captain-coach: Graeme Langlands; Captain(from May 76): Steve Edge

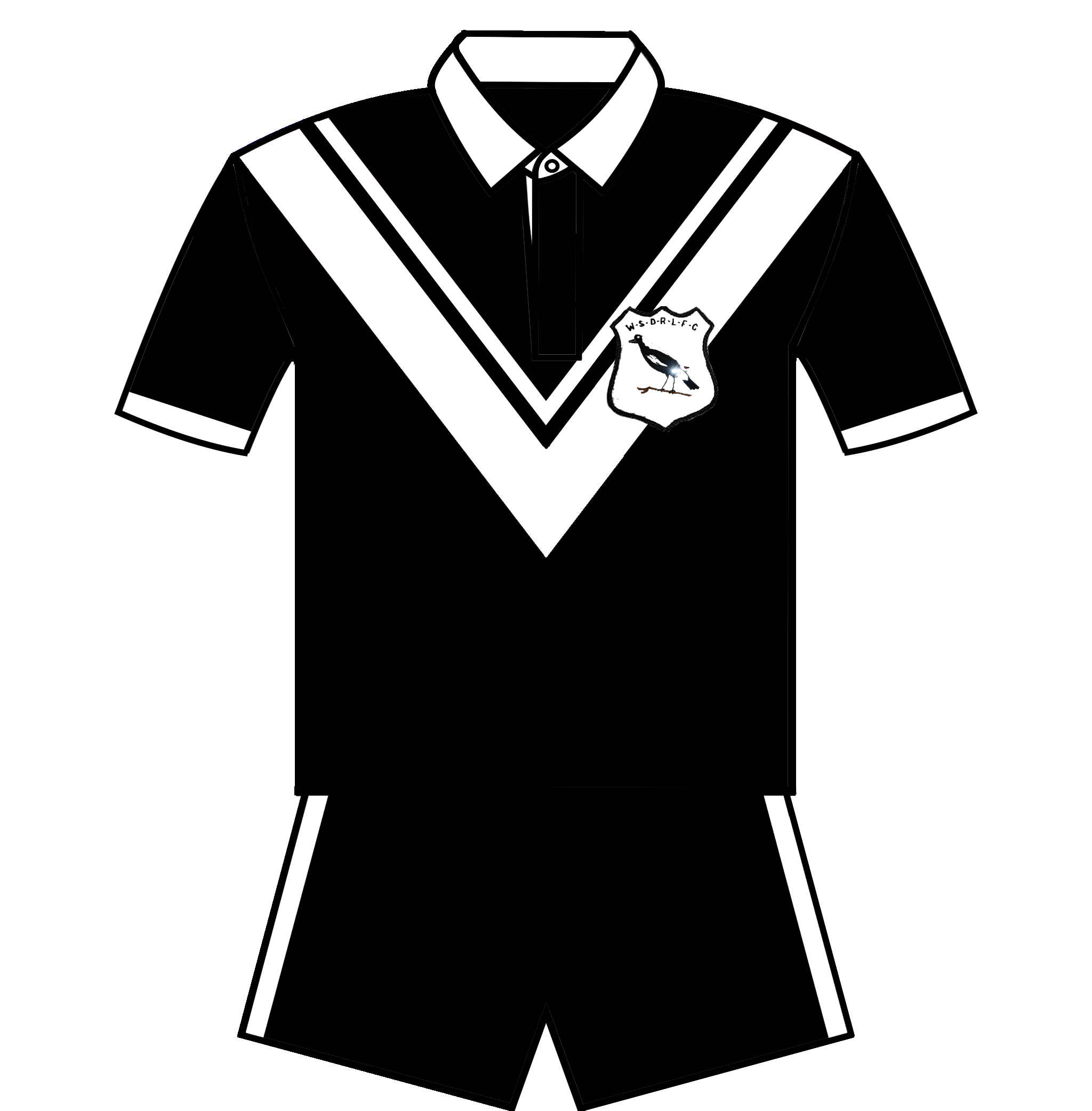
Western Suburbs; Magpies 69th season Ground: Lidcombe Oval; Coach: Don Parish; Captain: Tom Raudonikis

== Regular season ==
Team	1	2	3	4	5	6	7	8	9	10	11	12	13	14	15	16	17	18	19	20	21	22	23	F1	F2	F3	GF
Balmain Tigers	**CBY** **−1**	STG +13	**PAR** **+16**	**NOR** **+8**	EAS +5	**PEN** **+14**	NEW +13	**SOU** **+17**	WES; 0	CRO −3	MAN −14	**NEW** **−2**	CBY −17	X	PAR −4	NOR −10	**EAS** **+6**	PEN +7	**STG** **−11**	SOU +10	**WES** **+1**	**CRO** **+2**	**MAN** **−19**				
Canterbury-Bankstown	BAL +1	**CRO**; **0**	**MAN** **−10**	WES −7	STG +2	**PAR** **+7**	NOR +17	**EAS** **−1**	PEN −17	**NEW** **+3**	**SOU** **+13**	**NOR**; **0**	**BAL** **+17**	CRO −16	MAN +4	**WES** **+9**	**STG** **+1**	PAR; 0	EAS −23	X	**PEN** **−4**	NEW +16	SOU +12	EAS +9	STG +16	MAN −3	
Cronulla-Sutherland Sharks	**MAN** **−12**	CBY; 0	STG −3	**PAR** **−19**	NOR +14	**EAS** **−11**	PEN +8	NEW −4	**SOU** **+34**	**BAL** **+3**	WES −13	**PEN** **+1**	MAN −11	**CBY** **+16**	**STG** **−1**	PAR −23	**NOR** **+11**	EAS −20	**NEW** **+17**	X	SOU −3	BAL −2	**WES** **+3**				
Eastern Suburbs Roosters	WES −3	**PEN** **+4**	NEW +4	SOU −1	**BAL** **−5**	CRO +11	**MAN** **+1**	CBY +1	STG −3	**PAR**; **0**	**NOR** **+31**	MAN −5	**WES** **+3**	PEN +7	**NEW** **+36**	**SOU** **+10**	BAL −6	**CRO** **+20**	**CBY** **+23**	X	**STG** **−3**	PAR −7	NOR +31	**CBY** **−9**			
Manly Warringah Sea Eagles	CRO +12	**WES** **+4**	CBY +10	**STG** **+26**	PAR −3	**NOR** **+25**	EAS −1	**PEN** **+13**	NEW +51	SOU +2	**BAL** **+14**	**EAS** **+5**	**CRO** **+11**	WES +22	**CBY** **−4**	STG −8	**PAR** **−4**	NOR +23	X	PEN −1	**NEW** **+8**	**SOU** **+23**	BAL +19	X	**PAR** **−6**	**CBY** **+3**	**PAR** **+3**
Newtown Jets	PAR +3	**NOR** **−9**	**EAS** **−4**	PEN −5	**WES** **−24**	SOU −18	**BAL** **−13**	**CRO** **+4**	**MAN** **−51**	CBY −3	STG −8	BAL +2	**PAR** **−24**	NOR −5	EAS −36	**PEN** **−7**	WES −11	**SOU** **−15**	CRO −17	X	MAN −8	**CBY** **−16**	**STG** **−17**				
North Sydney Bears	PEN −34	NEW +9	**SOU** **−5**	BAL −8	**CRO** **−14**	MAN −25	**CBY** **−17**	STG −3	**PAR** **−36**	**WES** **−29**	EAS −31	CBY; 0	**PEN** **+6**	**NEW** **+5**	SOU −21	**BAL** **+10**	CRO −11	**MAN** **−23**	X	**STG** **+7**	PAR +6	WES −9	**EAS** **−31**				
Parramatta Eels	**NEW** **−3**	**SOU** **+17**	BAL −16	CRO +19	**MAN** **+3**	CBY −7	STG −16	**WES** **+4**	NOR +36	EAS; 0	**PEN** **+2**	**STG** **+11**	NEW +24	SOU +14	**BAL** **+4**	**CRO** **+23**	MAN +4	**CBY**; **0**	X	WES −12	**NOR** **−6**	**EAS** **+7**	PEN +1	**STG** **+25**	MAN +6	X	MAN −3
Penrith Panthers	**NOR** **+34**	EAS −4	**WES**; **0**	**NEW** **+5**	SOU −11	BAL −14	**CRO** **−8**	MAN −13	**CBY** **+17**	**STG** **+11**	PAR −2	CRO −1	NOR −6	**EAS** **−7**	WES +23	NEW +7	**SOU** **−6**	**BAL** **−7**	X	**MAN** **+1**	CBY +4	STG −3	**PAR** **−1**				
South Sydney Rabbitohs	**STG** **−21**	PAR −17	NOR +5	**EAS** **+1**	**PEN** **+11**	**NEW** **+18**	WES −4	BAL −17	CRO −34	**MAN** **−2**	CBY −13	**WES** **−21**	STG −6	**PAR** **−14**	**NOR** **+21**	EAS −10	PEN +6	NEW +15	X	**BAL** **−10**	**CRO** **+3**	MAN −23	**CBY** **−12**				
St. George Dragons	SOU +21	**BAL** **−13**	**CRO** **+3**	MAN −26	**CBY** **−2**	WES −10	**PAR** **+16**	**NOR** **+3**	**EAS** **+3**	PEN −11	**NEW** **+8**	PAR −11	**SOU** **+6**	X	CRO +1	**MAN** **+8**	CBY −1	**WES** **+8**	BAL +11	NOR −7	EAS +3	**PEN** **+3**	NEW +17	PAR −25	**CBY** **−16**		
Western Suburbs Magpies	**EAS** **+3**	MAN −4	PEN; 0	**CBY** **+7**	NEW +24	**STG** **+10**	**SOU** **+4**	PAR −4	**BAL**; **0**	NOR +29	**CRO** **+13**	SOU +21	EAS −3	**MAN** **−22**	**PEN** **−23**	CBY −9	**NEW** **+11**	STG −8	X	**PAR** **+12**	BAL −1	**NOR** **+9**	CRO −3				
Team	1	2	3	4	5	6	7	8	9	10	11	12	13	14	15	16	17	18	19	20	21	22	23	F1	F2	F3	GF

Bold – Home game
X – Bye
Opponent for round listed above margin

=== Ladder ===
	Team	Pld	W	D	L	PF	PA	PD	Pts
1	Manly	22	16	0	6	499	252	+247	32
2	Parramatta	22	14	2	6	347	238	+109	30
3	St. George	22	14	0	8	328	298	+30	28
4	Eastern Suburbs	22	13	1	8	399	250	+149	27
5	Canterbury	22	12	3	7	361	337	+24	27
6	Balmain	22	12	1	9	318	287	+31	25
7	Western Suburbs	22	11	2	9	379	313	+66	24
8	Cronulla	22	9	1	12	378	393	-15	19
9	Penrith	22	8	1	13	352	333	+19	17
10	South Sydney	22	8	0	14	297	421	-124	16
11	North Sydney	22	6	1	15	272	526	-254	13
12	Newtown	22	3	0	19	264	546	-282	6

=== Ladder progression ===
- Numbers highlighted in green indicate that the team finished the round inside the top 5.
- Numbers highlighted in blue indicates the team finished first on the ladder in that round.
- Numbers highlighted in red indicates the team finished last place on the ladder in that round.
- Underlined numbers indicate that the team had a bye during that round.

	Team	1	2	3	4	5	6	7	8	9	10	11	12	13	14	15	16	17	18	19	20	21	22	23
1	Manly Warringah Sea Eagles	2	4	6	8	8	10	10	12	14	16	18	20	22	24	24	24	24	26	26	26	28	30	32
2	Parramatta Eels	0	2	2	4	6	6	6	8	10	11	13	15	17	19	21	23	25	26	26	26	26	28	30
3	St. George Dragons	2	2	4	4	4	4	6	8	10	10	12	12	14	14	16	18	18	20	22	22	24	26	28
4	Eastern Suburbs Roosters	0	2	4	4	4	6	8	10	10	11	13	13	15	17	19	21	21	23	25	25	25	25	27
5	Canterbury-Bankstown	2	3	3	3	5	7	9	9	9	11	13	14	16	16	18	20	22	23	23	23	23	25	27
6	Balmain Tigers	0	2	4	6	8	10	12	14	15	15	15	15	15	15	15	15	17	19	19	21	23	25	25
7	Western Suburbs Magpies	2	2	3	5	7	9	11	11	12	14	16	18	18	18	18	18	20	20	20	22	22	24	24
8	Cronulla-Sutherland Sharks	0	1	1	1	3	3	5	5	7	9	9	11	11	13	13	13	15	15	17	17	17	17	19
9	Penrith Panthers	2	2	3	5	5	5	5	5	7	9	9	9	9	9	11	13	13	13	13	15	17	17	17
10	South Sydney Rabbitohs	0	0	2	4	6	8	8	8	8	8	8	8	8	8	10	10	12	14	14	14	16	16	16
11	North Sydney Bears	0	2	2	2	2	2	2	2	2	2	2	3	5	7	7	9	9	9	9	11	13	13	13
12	Newtown Jets	2	2	2	2	2	2	2	4	4	4	4	6	6	6	6	6	6	6	6	6	6	6	6

== Finals ==
Parramatta were first into the Grand final, triumphing 23–17 in a bloody and brutal major semi-final against Manly. Manly earned a grand final berth the following week, surviving a Canterbury comeback to win 15–12.

Home	Score	Away	Match information
Home	Score	Away	Date and time	Venue	Referee	Crowd
Qualifying Finals
Parramatta	31–6	St. George	28 August 1976	Sydney Cricket Ground	Greg Hartley	28,264
Eastern Suburbs Roosters	13–22	Canterbury-Bankstown	29 August 1976	Sydney Cricket Ground	Gary Cook	27,203
Semi-finals
Manly-Warringah	17–23	Parramatta	4 September 1976	Sydney Cricket Ground	Greg Hartley	30,999
St. George	9–25	Canterbury-Bankstown	5 September 1976	Sydney Cricket Ground	Gary Cook	27,261
Preliminary final
Manly-Warringah	15–12	Canterbury-Bankstown	11 September 1976	Sydney Cricket Ground	Gary Cook	31,381
Grand final
Parramatta	10–13	Manly-Warringah	18 September 1976	Sydney Cricket Ground	Gary Cook	57,343

=== Chart ===
Qualifying final
2	Parramatta	31
3	St. George	6
4	Eastern Suburbs	13
5	Canterbury	22

Major semi-final
1	Manly	17
Parramatta	23
Minor semi-final
St. George	9
Canterbury	25

Preliminary final
Manly	15
Canterbury	12

Grand final
Parramatta	10
Manly	13

=== Grand final ===
Parramatta	Position	Manly-Warringah
1. Mark Levy	FB	1. Graham Eadie
2. Jim Porter	WG	2. Tom Mooney
3. Ed Sulkowicz	CE	3. Russel Gartner
4. John Moran	CE	4. Bob Fulton (c)
5. Neville Glover	WG	5. Rod Jackson
6. John Peard	FE	6. Alan Thompson
7. John Kolc	HB	7. Gary Stephens
13. Graham Olling	PR	13. John Harvey
12. Ron Hilditch	HK	12. Max Krilich
11. Denis Fitzgerald	PR	11. Terry Randall
10. Geoff Gerard	SR	10. Steve Norton
9. Ray Higgs (c)	SR	9. Phil Lowe
8. Ray Price	LK	8. Ian Martin
14. Graeme Atkinson	Reserve	14. Gary Thoroughgood
15. John Baker	Reserve	17. Mark Willoughby
Terry Fearnley	Coach	Frank Stanton

In 1976, after 30 years of competition, Parramatta reached their first grand final since their admission into the NSWRFL premiership in 1947. Their opponents were Manly-Warringah, who had also joined the premiership in 1947, but were playing in their eighth Grand final, having previously won in 1972 and 1973 with captain Bob Fulton, fullback Graham Eadie, forward Terry Randall and lock Ian Martin having played in those two premiership teams.

Jim Porter scored first, getting Parramatta to a 5–0 lead. A penalty goal to Graham Eadie closed the score to 5–2 before Alan Thompson sidestepped through to send Phil Lowe in for Manly's first and only try. Scores were locked 7–7 at half time.

Geoff Gerard scored an unconverted try for the Eels early in the second half, then two penalties gave Manly an 11–10 lead.

Parramatta missed a critical opportunity to win the game and their first ever premiership with ten minutes of the match remaining: 15 metres out from a wide-open tryline, Eels winger Neville Glover dropped the pass from John Moran which would have given the Eels the match-winning try in the Paddington Hill corner.

Another penalty gave Manly a 13–10 lead. In the frantic dying minutes Parramatta threw everything they had at the Manly defence including the infamous "flying wedge" of dubious legality which had Ron Hilditch at the apex of a phalanx of players driving him towards the line. The wedge was somehow stopped by Eadie a foot short of the try line.

The Manly defence held and the Sea Eagles secured their third premiership in five seasons, while the Eels would have to wait five more years for their first.

It was Bob Fulton's 213th and final match for Manly after a ten-year career with the club and the grand final victory was largely credited to his play. He accepted the J.J. Giltinan Shield and was able to end his playing career at Manly on a victory. He would later return to the club as a coach in the 1980s but first he would finish his playing years and then commence coaching at Eastern Suburbs (Fulton would join Easts in 1977, on an offer from the club that was backed by one of Australia's richest men and a supporter of the future rugby league Immortal, Kerry Packer).

Manly's win was a triumph for the powerful triumvirate of Fulton, coach Frank Stanton and Secretary Ken Arthurson who would all go on to higher honours in the game. For Stanton, it was his first success in a coaching career which was to bring two premierships and two Ashes-winning Kangaroo tours. Arthurson had brought to the club players of a calibre to enable five Grand final appearances in the 1970s for four victories. He would go on to become the Chairman of the New South Wales Rugby League and later the Australian Rugby League.

Manly-Warringah 13 (Tries: Lowe. Goals: Eadie 5/6)

Parramatta 10 (Tries: Porter, Gerard. Goals: Peard 2/3)

Referee: Gary Cook
Attendance: 57,343

== Player statistics ==
The following statistics are as of the conclusion of Round 22.

Top 5 point scorers

Points	Player	Tries	Goals	Field Goals
207	Graham Eadie	9	90	0
161	Ron Giteau	7	70	0
143	John Brass	5	64	0
136	Don Moseley	2	65	0
130	Ken Wilson	3	60	1

Top 5 try scorers

Tries	Player
18	Bob Fulton
18	Tom Mooney
16	Terry Fahey
14	Martin Raftery
12	Bruce Walker

Top 5 goal scorers

Goals	Player
90	Graham Eadie
70	Ron Giteau
65	Don Moseley
64	John Brass
60	Ken Wilson
