= John Peard =

Australian RL coach and former Australia international rugby league footballer

Personal information
- Full name: John Henry Peard
- Born: 15 January 1945 (age 81) Atherton, Queensland, Australia

Playing information
- Height: 5 ft 8 in (173 cm)
- Weight: 12 st 0 lb (76 kg)
- Position: Five-eighth
Club
Years	Team	Pld	T	G	FG	P
1966–71	Eastern Suburbs	62	11	0	10	53
1972–73	St. George	17	3	0	1	10
1974–75	Eastern Suburbs	45	5	28	0	71
1976–79	Parramatta Eels	59	16	62	0	172
	Total	183	35	90	11	306
Representative
Years	Team	Pld	T	G	FG	P
1976–77	New South Wales	4	0	1	0	2
1975–77	Australia	11	4	0	0	12
1976–77	NSW City	2	1	0	0	3

Coaching information
Club
Years	Team	Gms	W	D	L	W%
1980	Parramatta Eels	22	11	2	9	50
1982–83	Penrith Panthers	52	16	1	35	31
1988	NSW Country	1	1	0	0	100
1988	New South Wales	3	0	0	3	0
	Total	78	28	3	47	36

John "Bomber" Peard (born 15 January 1945) is an Australian former rugby league footballer and later coach. An Australian international and New South Wales representative Five-eighth, he played for the Eastern Suburbs, St George and Parramatta NSWRFL clubs in the 1960s and 1970s. Peard's nickname, 'Bomber', came from his revolutionary towering punt kick, popularly referred to as a bomb, which terrorised opposition players, especially the Fullbacks and Wingers they were aimed at. It has now become a common feature of the modern game.

== Playing career ==
Peard played in Eastern Suburbs lower grades before making his 1st grade debut in 1966. That year the Easts failed to win a game. But the club enjoyed more success over the next few years under the coaching of Jack Gibson. They reached the Semi-finals in 1967 and 1968.

After failing to reach the finals for the next three seasons, Peard joined Graeme Langlands at St. George in 1972 and stayed for two seasons.

In 1974 Peard, along with coach Jack Gibson, rejoined the Eastern Suburbs club for one of the most successful periods in the club's history. He was a key figure for Easts, winning back to back premierships in 1974 and 1975, and they were also a winner of mid-week and pre-season cups. In Easts 38–0, 1975 premiership victory over St George, Peard kicked 7 goals. At the end of the 1975 season Peard was selected to represent Australia in that year's Rugby League World Cup, scoring a try in Australia's 25-0 thumping of England at Headingley in Leeds.

Peard joined the Parramatta Eels in 1976 and was named 'player of the year' that season, helping the club to its first ever Grand Final appearance where they faced one of the power teams of the 1970s, Manly-Warringah. His "bomb" came into play early in the Grand Final as Manly winger Tom Mooney dropped a bomb over his tryline leading to a try by Eels winger Jim Porter. Unfortunately for Peard and Parramatta, the club's first premiership eluded them as Manly ran out 13–10 winners.

Parramatta made their second Grand Final in succession in 1977, this time facing Peard's former team St. George. It was to be the first drawn Grand Final in premiership history with the scores locked at 9–9 at full time. The replay was a disaster for the Parramatta club as St. George ran riot, winning 22–0.

By 1978, injuries had begun to take their toll and Peard retired at the end of the 1979 season.

== Post-playing career ==
Peard moved on to coach Parramatta, Penrith Panthers, and became the coach of New South Wales for the 1988 State of Origin series, in which NSW lost the series 3-0 despite having home ground advantage for the first time since the Origin concept became a series in 1982. His tenure lasted just one series as he was sacked following the Blues' whitewash series defeat, leaving him the least successful coach in State of Origin history.

Peard was later the assistant coach, then officially the first grade 'co-coach' alongside Mark Murray at the Sydney Roosters during 1993–94.

Peard also worked for the ABC as a rugby league commentator, most notably alongside Warren Boland and Arthur Beetson. This usually involved being the sideline caller of Saturday afternoon NSWRL games, for which the ABC had the live TV coverage rights for decades until the advent of the Super League War in 1995. Peard was famous for his humorous rapport with Boland, and in particular former teammate Beetson.

Peard is a life member of the Eastern Suburbs club. The John Peard Cup, which commenced in 2004, was named in his honour.

Peard suffered a life-threatening stroke in 2002 and he documents his rehabilitation in his autobiography Fine Thanks Mate: John 'The Bomber' Peard on Football, Life and Second Chances, released in April 2007. As part of the book promotion he appeared on The NRL Sunday Footy Show on 1 April 2007.
