= Ted Sulkowicz =

Australian rugby league footballer

Personal information
- Full name: Ted Sulkowicz
- Born: 1955
- Died: 5 July 2022

Playing information
- Position: Five-eighth
Club
Years	Team	Pld	T	G	FG	P
1974–78	Parramatta	22	0	1	0	2
- Source: As of 29 February 2024

Ted Sulkowicz (1955–2022) was an Australian former professional rugby league footballer who played in the 1970s. He played for Parramatta in the NSWRL competition.

== Playing career ==
Sulkowicz made his first grade debut in round 14 of the 1974 NSWRFL season against Western Suburbs at Lidcombe Oval. Sulkowicz was part of the 1976 and 1977 Parramatta squads which reached the grand final however he didn't feature in any of the clubs finals matches or the grand final losses to Manly and St. George respectively. Sulkowicz's final game for the club ironically came against Western Suburbs in round 8 of the 1978 NSWRFL season. His brother Ed Sulkowicz played for Parramatta between 1974 and 1980 making 68 appearances.
