= Gordon Willoughby =

Australian rugby league footballer

Personal information
- Full name: Gordon Willoughby
- Born: 16 June 1925 Sydney, New South Wales, Australia
- Died: 11 January 2005 (aged 79) Sydney, New South Wales, Australia

Playing information
- Position: Centre
Club
Years	Team	Pld	T	G	FG	P
1947–54	Manly-Warringah	130	60	0	0	180
Representative
Years	Team	Pld	T	G	FG	P
1951–52	Australia	2	1	0	0	3
1951–54	NSW Country	4	3	0	0	9
1954	NSW City	1	1	0	0	3
- Source: As of 26 March 2019
- Relatives: Mark Willoughby (son)

Gordon Willoughby (1925–2005) was an Australian professional rugby league footballer who played in the 1940s and 1950s. He played for Manly-Warringah in the NSWRL competition. Willoughby was a foundation player for Manly-Warringah featuring in the club's first season.

== Playing career ==
Willoughby made his first grade debut for Manly-Warringah in 1947 during the club's first season and scored 7 tries in his debut year. In 1951, Willoughby was selected to play for New South Wales and Australia. At club level, Manly went on to reach the 1951 NSWRL grand final against South Sydney. Willougby played at centre as Souths comprehensively beat Manly 42–14 in the final which was played at the Sydney Sports Ground. At the time this was the highest scoring grand final since 1908. Willoughby finished the season as Manly's top try scorer. He was kept relatively quiet in the grand final as just two weeks earlier he scored a hat-trick in Manly's first ever finals game against Western Suburbs.

In 1952, Willoughby made his final appearance for Australia as he was selected for the test against New Zealand which ended in defeat. Willoughby continued to be selected for New South Wales and appeared in 2 games during 1952 scoring 2 tries against Queensland.

Willoughby played with Manly-Warringah up until the end of the 1954 season before retiring as a player. His last representative honor was being selected for NSW City in which he scored a try against NSW Country.

== Post playing ==
After retirement, Willoughby served Manly as an administrator for the club and later became vice president. He was also a delegate to the NSWRL and chairman of the board of directors. He died in 2005. At the end of year awards, Manly present the Gordon Willoughby Medal to the player of the year.
