= John Moran (rugby league) =

Australian rugby league footballer (1948–2024)

Personal information
- Full name: John Malcolm Moran
- Born: 19 March 1948 Taree, New South Wales, Australia
- Died: 19 February 2024 (aged 75)

Playing information
- Position: Centre
Club
Years	Team	Pld	T	G	FG	P
1969–73	Penrith	50	15	0	0	45
1974–77	Parramatta	33	9	0	0	27
	Total	83	24	0	0	72
- Relatives: Grahame Moran (brother)

John Moran (19 March 1948 – 19 February 2024) was an Australian former rugby league footballer who played in the 1960s and 1970s. He played for Penrith and Parramatta in the NSWRL competition. Moran is the younger brother of Penrith hall of fame member Grahame Moran.

== Playing career ==
Moran was a Penrith junior and made his first grade debut for the club in 1969. Moran spent 5 seasons at Penrith as it struggled to be competitive in the NSWRL competition finishing down the bottom of the table and finishing last in 1973. In 1974, Moran joined Parramatta and his first season at the club was a tough one as it finished second last only avoiding the wooden spoon by for and against. In 1975, Parramatta signed former St George player Norm Provan as head coach and the club went from easy beats to a competitive side finishing 5th on the table and qualifying for the finals. Moran was not featured in either of Parramatta's final matches. In 1976, Provan left the club as head coach and was replaced by Terry Fearnley. Parramatta went on to finish second in the regular season and qualified for the finals. Parramatta went on to defeat St George 31-6 with Moran scoring a try and Manly 23-17 to reach their first ever grand final.

In the 1976 grand final with 10 minutes remaining, Parramatta passed the ball from one side of the field to the other. The second last pass reached Moran who drew his marker in and passed it to winger Neville Glover, who had the try line unmarked. Glover dropped the pass thrown by Moran over the line. The try may have given Parramatta its first premiership victory. Manly went on to win the grand final 13-10. The following year, Parramatta won its first ever minor premiership and reached its second consecutive grand final against St George. The grand final ended in a 9-9 draw and the teams needed to return the following week for a replay. St George went on to overpower Parramatta to win 22-0. Moran featured throughout the season but did not play in the finals or the grand final.
