= Ed Sulkowicz =

Australian rugby league footballer

Personal information
- Full name: Ed Sulkowicz
- Born: 31 January 1954 (age 71); Parramatta, New South Wales, Australia

Playing information
- Position: Centre
Club
Years	Team	Pld	T	G	FG	P
1974–80	Parramatta	68	12	3	0	42

Ed Sulkowicz (born 31 January 1954) is an Australian former professional rugby league footballer who played in the 1970s and 1980s.

== Playing career ==
Sulkowicz made his first grade debut for Parramatta in the 1974 season. In 1976, Sulkowicz was a member of Parramatta's first ever grand final squad which made the final against Manly. It had taken the club 30 years to reach their first decider. In the second half of the match and with under 10 minutes remaining, Parramatta threw the ball out to the right hand side of the field and looked certain to score the match winning try only for winger Neville Glover to drop the ball over the line. Manly went on to win the match 13–10.

The following season, Sulkowicz played in his second grand final, the 1977 decider against St George. Parramatta had finished as minor premiers that year and came into the match with the experiences learned from their first grand final defeat. In the first half, Sulkowicz scored a try in a move that was created by Ray Price. The match finished in a 9–9 draw and the sides would need to meet again the following week for a replay. In the grand final replay, St George overpowered Parramatta to win 22–0. Sulkowicz went on to play three more seasons for the club and retired at the end of 1980. His brother Ted Sulkowicz also played for Parramatta between 1976 and 1978.

== Post playing ==
In 1999, Sulkowicz was made a life member of the club.
