= Mark Levy (rugby league) =

Australian rugby league footballer

Personal information
- Full name: Mark Levy
- Born: 19 March 1955 (age 70); Waverley, New South Wales, Australia

Playing information
- Position: Fullback
Club
Years	Team	Pld	T	G	FG	P
1974–75	Balmain Tigers	28	5	4	0	23
1976–80	Parramatta Eels	87	19	65	1	188
1981–85	Penrith Panthers	103	17	135	0	330
	Total	218	41	204	1	541

Mark Levy (born 19 March 1955) is an Australian former professional rugby league footballer who played in the 1970s and 1980s. He played for Balmain Tigers, Parramatta Eels and Penrith as a fullback in Sydney's NSWRFL competition in the 1980s.

== Playing career ==
Levy's rugby league career started at the Patrician Brothers' College, Fairfield. He was a Parramatta junior but made his debut for Balmain in 1974. Levy spent two years at Balmain with the club finishing between mid and lower table. In 1976, Levy signed with Parramatta as the club qualified for the first grand final in its history against Manly. In the grand final itself, Parramatta went into half time level with Manly at 7-7. In the second half and with 10 minutes remaining, Parramatta made a play to the right hand side of the field and the ball eventually reached Neville Glover. With the try line wide open, Glover dropped the ball over the line which would have given Parramatta the match winning try. In the final five minutes Manly held on after a Parramatta onslaught to win the premiership 13-10.

The following year, Levy was a member of the Parramatta side which claimed their first minor premiership after finishing first during the regular season. Parramatta qualified for their second consecutive grand final that year against St George. Levy was moved from fullback to five-eighth for that match due to John Peard being injured. The grand final finished in a 9-9 draw and a replay was rescheduled to determine the winner. In the 1977 replay, Levy shifted to fullback as Peard had returned, and Parramatta were defeated 22-0. Levy played with Parramatta up until the end of 1980 when he was told by coach Jack Gibson he was not required for the 1981 season.

Levy later moved to Penrith where he played more than 100 games, and was a member of the 1985 side which qualified for the finals for the first time in the club's history.

== Post playing ==
In retirement, Levy became an ABC commentator on rugby league matches in the 1980s and 1990s, appearing regularly on Grandstand with broadcasters Peter Wilkins, Tracy Holmes and Phil Kafcaloudes. He then joined the Parramatta board and worked under CEO Denis Fitzgerald. In the 1990s, Levy became CEO at Penrith and was in charge of the club as it moved from the ARL to the Super League in 1997. Levy stepped down as Penrith CEO after the club finished last in 2001. In the mid 1990’s he was deputy principal at St Columba’s Springwood where his children attended.
