= Peter Young (rugby league) =

Australian rugby league footballer

Personal information
- Full name: Peter Young
- Born: Sydney, New South Wales, Australia

Playing information
- Position: Prop, Lock
Club
Years	Team	Pld	T	G	FG	P
1975–78	Western Suburbs	42	2	0	0	6
Representative
Years	Team	Pld	T	G	FG	P
1980	Country NSW	1	0	0	0	0

Peter Young (born in Sydney, New South Wales) was an Australian professional rugby league footballer for the Western Suburbs Magpies in the Australian New South Wales Rugby League premiership competition. Young played front row for the Magpies in the number 13 jersey throughout his career.

== Career playing statistics ==
=== Point scoring summary ===
Games	Tries	Goals	F/G	Points
37	2	-	-	8

=== Matches played ===
Team	Matches	Years
Western Suburbs	37	1975–1979
