= Ray Higgs =

Australia international rugby league footballer

Personal information
- Full name: Raymond Higgs
- Born: 1950 (age 75–76) Roma, Queensland, Australia

Playing information
- Position: Second-row
Club
Years	Team	Pld	T	G	FG	P
1975–77	Parramatta Eels	69	11	0	0	33
1978	Manly Warringah	10	1	0	0	3
	Total	79	12	0	0	36
Representative
Years	Team	Pld	T	G	FG	P
1975–77	New South Wales	8	0	0	0	0
1974–80	Queensland	4	0	0	0	0
1974–77	Australia	10	2	0	0	6
1975–77	NSW City	3	1	0	0	3

Ray Higgs (born 1950) is an Australian former rugby league footballer who played in the 1970s. An Australian international and Queensland representative forward, he played club football in the NSWRFL Premiership with Sydney's Parramatta Eels for three seasons between 1975 and 1977 and Manly-Warringah Sea Eagles for one season 1978.

== Playing career ==
Originally from Roma, Queensland, Higgs played for Nambour-based Souths Magpies. He was selected to represent Queensland and then made his debut for the Australian national side in 1974. The following year he helped the Kangaroos to victory in the 1975 World Cup. After winning both the Rothmans Medal and the Rugby League Week player of the year award in 1976, he captained his club, the Parramatta Eels, to that year's and 1977's Grand Finals. Higgs continued representing Australia, featuring in The Kangaroos' triumph in the 1977 World Cup. Higgs is listed on the Australian Players Register as Kangaroo No. 478. He played a total of nine Tests for Australia between 1974 and 1977.

After only four seasons in the NSWRFL, Ray Higgs returned to Queensland in 1979.

== Accolades ==
In 2011, Higgs was inducted into the Parramatta Eels hall of fame.
