= Don Moseley =

Australian rugby league footballer

Personal information
- Full name: Don Moseley
- Born: 4 April 1954 (age 72) Yagoona, New South Wales, Australia

Playing information
- Position: Centre, Halfback, Lock, Wing
Club
Years	Team	Pld	T	G	FG	P
1974–76	Canterbury Bankstown	51	5	127	0	269
1977–79	Western Suburbs	42	7	17	0	55
	Total	93	12	144	0	324

Don Moseley (born 4 April 1954) is an Australian former professional rugby league footballer who played in the 1970s. He played for Canterbury Bankstown and Western Suburbs in the New South Wales Rugby League premiership. He played in multiple positions and was mainly used as a utility player.

== Playing career ==
Moseley began his first grade career with Canterbury in 1974. In the same season he played in the 1974 grand final loss against Eastern Suburbs. In 1975 and 1976, Canterbury qualified for the finals but fell short of a grand final appearance on both occasions. In 1977, Moseley joined Western Suburbs and in 1978 was a member of the Wests side which won the minor premiership for the first time since 1961 but bowed out of the finals series losing both matches to Manly and Cronulla respectively. In 1979, Wests qualified for the finals again but were eliminated in the first week losing to Canterbury 20–6. This would prove to be Moseley's last game in first grade and he retired at the end of the year.

== Post playing ==
Moseley worked as an around the grounds reporter for the Continuous Call Team on 2UE and 2GB from 1982 to 2015.
