= Terry Geary =

Australian rugby league footballer

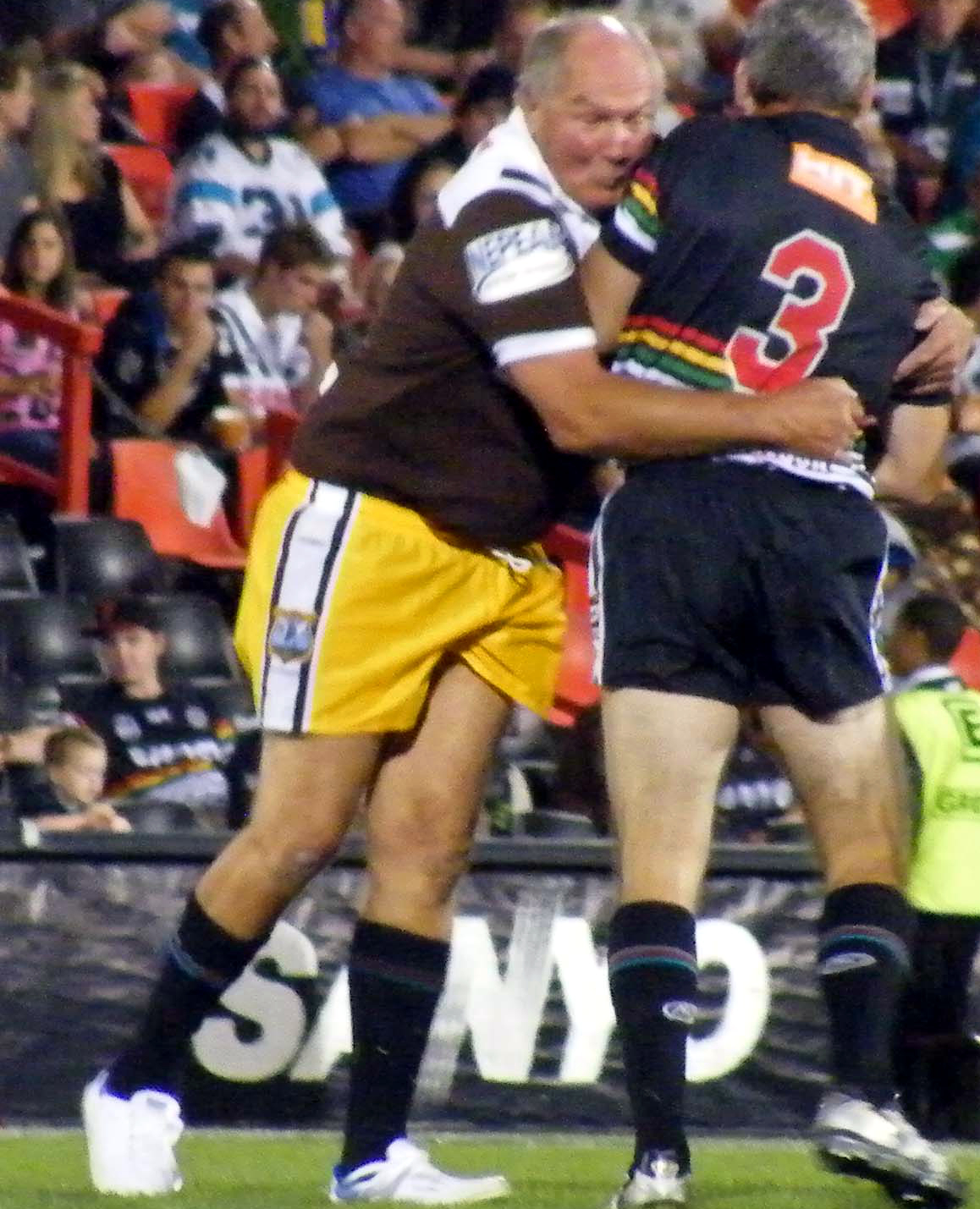

Personal information
- Full name: Terry Geary

Playing information
- Position: Prop
Club
Years	Team	Pld	T	G	FG	P
1969–76	Penrith Panthers	93	5	0	0	15
- Source: As of 4 September 2016

Terry Geary is an Australian former professional rugby league footballer who played for the Penrith Panthers in the NSWRL Premiership. He played as a prop forward.

Geary was selected by committee of experts for a Penrith ‘Team of Legends’, representing 40 years of competition in the top grade of Rugby League at Penrith in 2006.
