= John Baker (rugby league) =

Australian rugby league footballer

Personal information
- Full name: John Baker
- Born: 10 January 1946 (age 80) Portland, New South Wales, Australia

Playing information
- Position: Prop, Lock, Second-row
Club
Years	Team	Pld	T	G	FG	P
1968–73	Western Suburbs	105	21	0	0	63
1974–79	Parramatta	63	5	0	0	15
	Total	168	26	0	0	78

John Baker is an Australian former professional rugby league footballer who played in the 1960s and 1970s. He played for Western Suburbs and Parramatta in the NSWRL competition.

== Playing career ==
Baker grew up in Portland, New South Wales but made the move to Sydney and played his first grade match for Western Suburbs in 1968. Baker spent a largely unsuccessful time with Wests as the club finished towards to bottom of the table and claimed a wooden spoon in 1971. In 1974, Baker joined Parramatta with the club finishing second last in his first season there. Parramatta only avoided the wooden spoon because they had a better for and against as opposed to last placed Balmain. In 1975, Parramatta signed former St George legend Norm Provan as coach and the club had a major form reversal qualifying for the finals.

In 1976, Parramatta finished second on the table and qualified for the finals. Parramatta went on to defeat St George and Manly in the finals series to qualify for the club's first ever grand final. In the 1976 grand final, Baker was selected to play and was placed on the reserves bench. During the match with 10 minutes left to play, Parramatta passed the ball to the right hand side which ended in the hands of John Moran. Moran passed the ball to winger Neville Glover who dropped the ball over the try line with no Manly player in front of him. The try would have given Parramatta their first premiership victory but Manly held on to win the grand final 13-10.

The following year in 1977, Baker was part of the Parramatta side which won its first minor premiership and qualified for its second grand final. Parramatta played against St George in the grand final with Baker starting at second-row. In a tense game, the match ended in a 9-9 draw. The rules at the time meant that both sides would need to attend the following week and play again. In the grand final replay, Baker resumed his position at second-row but Parramatta were outplayed in the match and lost 22-0.

Baker went on to play for Parramatta in 1978 when they made the finals by finishing 5th and in 1979 when the club finished 2nd but lost to Canterbury in the preliminary finals. Baker retired at the end of the season after playing 12 years of first grade.
