= Martin Raftery =

Australian rugby league footballer

Personal information
- Full name: Martin Raftery

Playing information
- Position: Five-eighth
Club
Years	Team	Pld	T	G	FG	P
1975–1979	Cronulla-Sutherland	52	22	0	0	66

Martin Raftery is a former professional rugby league footballer who played in the 1970s. His preferred position was five-eighth.

== Medical career ==
Raftery was one of the inaugural Fellows of the Australasian College of Sport and Exercise Physicians. He has worked as team doctor for St. George Illawarra and the Australia national rugby union team. He is currently Chief Medical Officer for World Rugby.
