= Mark Willoughby =

Australian rugby league footballer

Personal information
- Full name: Mark Willoughby
- Born: 25 February 1951 (age 74); Sydney, New South Wales, Australia

Playing information
- Position: Second-row, Prop
Club
| Years | Team | Pld | T | G | FG | P |
|---|---|---|---|---|---|---|
| 1972–81 | Manly Sea Eagles | 50 | 5 | 1 | 0 | 17 |
| 1972–73 | Hull FC | | | | 0 |
| | Total | 50 | 5 | 1 | 0 | 17 |
- Source: As of 14 May 2024
- Father: Gordon Willoughby

Mark Willoughby (born 25 February 1951) is an Australian former rugby league footballer who played in the 1970s and 1980s. He played for Manly-Warringah the New South Wales Rugby League (NSWRL) competition, and Hull FC in England.

== Background ==
Willoughby was born in Sydney, New South Wales, Australia. He is the son of former Manly player Gordon Willoughby who played for the club in the 1940s and 1950s.

== Playing career ==
Willoughby made his first grade debut in 1972. Willoughby was not selected to play for Manly in the 1972 NSWRL grand final where the club won its maiden premiership defeating Eastern Suburbs 19–14. The following year, Willoughby missed out on selection in Manly's second premiership victory against Cronulla-Sutherland.

Willougby missed the entire 1974 season before returning in 1975. Willoughby played in Manly's 1975 preliminary final loss against Eastern Suburbs scoring a try in a 28–13 defeat. In 1976, Manly claimed the minor premiership and reached the grand final against the Parramatta Eels who were playing in their first ever grand final. Willoughby was selected to play from the bench. In the grand final itself, Parramatta went into half time level with Manly at 7–7. In the second half and with 10 minutes remaining, Parramatta made a play to the right hand side of the field and the ball eventually reached Neville Glover. With the try line wide open, Glover dropped the ball over the line which would have given Parramatta the match winning try. In the final five minutes Manly held on after a Parramatta onslaught to win the premiership 13–10.

In 1978, Willoughby missed the entire season through injury as Manly won their 4th premiership defeating Cronulla in the grand final. Willoughby played with Manly up until the end of the 1981 season before retiring.
