= John Harvey (rugby league) =

Australian RL coach and former rugby league footballer

Personal information
- Full name: John Harvey
- Born: 19 April 1955 (age 71) Manly, New South Wales, Australia

Playing information
- Position: Prop
Club
Years	Team	Pld	T	G	FG	P
1975–78	Manly-Warringah	61	2	0	0	6
1979–82	Eastern Suburbs	61	6	0	0	18
1984	Manly-Warringah	13	1	0	0	4
	Total	135	9	0	0	28

Coaching information
Club
Years	Team	Gms	W	D	L	W%
1994–95	Gold Coast Seagulls	43	9	2	32	21
1999–00	Salford City Reds	58	16	1	41	28
	Total	101	25	3	73	25

John Harvey (born 19 April 1955) is an Australian former professional rugby league footballer who played in the 1970s and 1980s, and coached in the 1990s. He played for Manly-Warringah and Eastern Suburbs and coached the Gold Coast Seagulls and the Salford City Reds. Harvey primarily played at prop.

== Playing career ==
Harvey was a Manly junior who grew into a hard-hitting prop with a reputation for a high-arm action when making a shoulder charge. Harvey played in two grand-finals while at Manly, in the 1976 win over Parramatta. Harvey was selected to represent Australia for one Test in 1978 against New Zealand but spent the whole game on the interchange bench. He played in the 1978 NSWRFL season's Grand Final draw and subsequent win over Cronulla-Sutherland. Harvey had a further chance that year to play in an international when he was selected for the 1978 Kangaroo tour, but he created some controversy when he declined the selection for personal reasons.

After receiving an offer which doubled his Manly pay-packet, Harvey signed with Easts in 1979. He played in Easts losing 1980 grand final side and remained with the club until the end of 1982 when he "went bush". In 1983, Harvey captain-coached the Tweed Heads Seagulls for a season, winning the Group 18 premiership as well as the Country Rugby League's Clayton Cup.

Bob Fulton made Harvey an offer to return to Manly in 1984 but his playing contract wasn't extended for the following season and Harvey returned to country football once more.

Harvey continued to play in NSW country leagues until 1992, with seasons at Forster-Tuncurry Hawks, Tweed Heads Seagulls and Wee Waa. He captain-coached the Tweed Heads Seagulls to another Clayton Cup win in 1989. Harvey finished his playing career at Wee Waa, leading the team to a grand final victory in the Group 4 competition at the age of 37.

== Coaching career ==
Harvey returned to the Gold Coast as coach of the Seagulls in 1994, succeeding Wally Lewis, who had held the post for the previous two seasons. The club undertook new ownership in 1996, being rebranded as the Gold Coast Chargers, and Phil Economidis took over from Harvey as coach.

In May 1999, Harvey replaced Andy Gregory as head coach at the Salford City Reds in the Super League. After the club avoided relegation at the end of the 1999 season, Harvey was given a contract for a further season.
