= Ian Martin (rugby league) =

Australian rugby league footballer (1951–2026)

Personal information
- Full name: Ian Martin
- Born: 1 July 1951
- Died: 29 August 2026 (aged 75)

Playing information
- Position: Five-eighth, Lock
Club
Years	Team	Pld	T	G	FG	P
1969–1978	Manly-Warringah	155	34	0	0	102
Representative
Years	Team	Pld	T	G	FG	P
1972	New South Wales	1	0	0	0	0
1975	NSW Country	1	0	0	0	0
- Source: Whiticker/Hudson

Ian Martin (1 July 1951 – 29 August 2026) was an Australian rugby league footballer who played in the 1960s and 1970s. Martin won multiple premierships with the Manly-Warringah Sea Eagles.

== Career ==
Martin was graded as a 16-year-old with Manly in 1967. He played nine seasons of first grade football with Manly-Warringah Sea Eagles between 1969 and 1974 and between 1976 and 1978.

He holds the rare distinction of playing in five grand finals with Manly, winning four of them. His first was in the side that lost the 1970 Grand Final to Souths. He then starred in the winning Manly-Warringah Sea Eagles teams of 1972, 1973, 1976 and the 1978 draw and replay.

Martin started his career as a five-eighth and finished as a lock-forward. He played 155 first grade games and scored 34 tries during his career. His only representative appearances were for New South Wales in 1972, and after a short stint as the captain-coach of Sawtell, New South Wales, in 1975, he represented N.S.W. Country Firsts that year. Martin retired at the conclusion of the 1978 NSWRFL season.

== Death ==
Martin died in August 2026, at the age of 75, after a long illness.
