= Gary Thoroughgood =

Australian rugby league footballer

Personal information
- Full name: Gary Thoroughgood
- Born: Sydney, New South Wales, Australia

Playing information
- Position: Second-row
Club
Years	Team	Pld	T	G	FG	P
1972–78	Manly-Warringah	80	12	0	0	36
- Source: As of 5 April 2019

Gary Thoroughgood also known as "Garry Thoroughgood" is an Australian former rugby league footballer who played in the 1970s. He played for Manly-Warringah the New South Wales Rugby League (NSWRL) competition.

== Background ==
Thoroughgood was born in Sydney, New South Wales, Australia. He played his junior rugby league with Harbord United before being graded by Manly.

== Playing career ==
Thoroughgood made his first grade debut in 1972. Over the next couple of seasons, Thoroughgood was mainly used as a reserve or featured in the occasional game for Manly but was selected to play for the club in their 1975 finals campaign.

In 1976, Manly claimed the minor premiership and reached the grand final against the Parramatta Eels who were playing in their first ever grand final. Thoroughgood was selected to play from the bench. In the grand final itself, Parramatta went into half time level with Manly at 7–7. In the second half and with 10 minutes remaining, Parramatta made a play to the right hand side of the field and the ball eventually reached Neville Glover. With the try line wide open, Glover dropped the ball over the line which would have given Parramatta the match winning try. In the final five minutes Manly held on after a Parramatta onslaught to win the premiership 13–10.

Thoroughgood played with Manly up until the end of the 1978 season before retiring.
