= John Gibbs (rugby league) =

Australian rugby league player

Personal information
- Full name: John Vincent Gibbs
- Born: 16 May 1956 (age 70) Manly, New South Wales, Australia

Playing information
- Position: Halfback
Club
Years	Team	Pld	T	G	FG	P
1976–81	Manly Sea Eagles	87	44	0	3	135
Representative
Years	Team	Pld	T	G	FG	P
1978	New South Wales	1	0	0	0	0
1978	Australia	0	0	0	0	0

John Gibbs (born 16 May 1956) is an Australian radio personality and former rugby league footballer. A New South Wales state and Australia national representative half back of the 1970s and 1980s, he played his club football with the Manly-Warringah Sea Eagles. Gibbs spent 2012 as a presenter on NRL Daily and was also the host of Sydney radio station 2UE's Sports Today program, and has appeared regularly on The Footy Show. He was also previously a member of the Gibbs-Hadley Continuous Call Team. Gibbs and fellow commentator Darryl Brohman were successfully head-hunted from radio 2UE after the 1999 NRL season and both then spear-headed the successful 2GB rugby league radio coverage from the beginning of the 2000 season, along with Jon Harker. Gibbs, showing his versatility, also called rugby union matches for the ABC.

Gibbs started his football career as a Manly junior and played in the NSWRFL premiership in the 1970s and 1980s as halfback of the Sea Eagles. He was selected for the 1978 Kangaroo tour but didn't play in any test matches. After his football career was prematurely ended due to injury, he started a successful career in radio. He has also worked as a player and celebrity manager, one of his clients being former team-mate Paul Vautin. In 2003 Gibbs was inducted into the Northern Beaches Sporting Hall of Fame. As of 2022, Gibbs is part of the ABC Sports team, calling NRL games alongside people such as Tim Gavel, Andrew Moore, and Luke Lewis.
