= Graeme Atkins (rugby league) =

Australian rugby league footballer

Personal information
- Full name: Graeme Atkins
- Born: 9 June 1956 (age 68); Sydney, New South Wales, Australia

Playing information
- Position: Wing, Fullback
Club
Years	Team	Pld	T	G	FG	P
1975–82	Parramatta Eels	79	32	0	0	99
1983–84	Eastern Suburbs	26	5	0	1	21
1985–87	Parramatta Eels	44	10	22	0	84
	Total	149	47	22	1	204

Graeme Atkins (born 9 June 1956) is an Australian former professional rugby league footballer who played in the 1970s and 1980s.

== Playing career ==
Atkins made his first grade debut for Parramatta in the 1975 season against Western Suburbs. Atkins was a replacement in the 1976 grand final against Manly-Warringah but was in the starting side for the 1977 grand final and the subsequent replay against St George. In 1981, Atkins scored a try in Parramatta's maiden premiership victory over Newtown. In 1982, Atkins played in the preliminary final victory over Eastern Suburbs but did not feature in the grand final victory of that season.

In 1983, Atkins made the move to Easts but only spent two seasons there before returning to Parramatta. In 1986, Atkins played in 16 games for Parramatta but was not included in the victorious grand final side over Canterbury. Atkins played one more season for Parramatta before retiring at the end of 1987. In 2000, Atkins was made a life member of the Parramatta rugby league club.
