= Alan Thompson (rugby league, born 1953) =

Australian RL coach and former Australia international rugby league footballer

Personal information
- Born: 10 October 1953 (age 73) Sydney, New South Wales, Australia

Playing information
- Position: Five-eighth
Club
Years	Team	Pld	T	G	FG	P
1973–84	Manly Sea Eagles	263	62	0	2	199
Representative
Years	Team	Pld	T	G	FG	P
1979–84	New South Wales	10	2	0	0	6
1978–80	Australia	7	0	0	0	0
1979–84	NSW City	4	0	0	0	0

Coaching information
Club
Years	Team	Gms	W	D	L	W%
1989	Manly Sea Eagles	22	9	1	12	41
- Source: As of 31 October 2019

Alan Thompson (born 10 October 1953 in Sydney, New South Wales) is an Australian former professional rugby league footballer and coach. He played for the Manly-Warringah Sea Eagles in the New South Wales Rugby League (NSWRL) competition from 1973 to 1984 and coached the club in 1989. He primarily played at Five-eighth.

== Career ==
=== Playing ===
Thompson was a local Manly district junior from Narrabeen, who could also play at Halfback or in the Centres. He was graded by the Sea Eagles in 1973 and played in the club's Reserve Grade premiership win that year (the first grade team also won their second straight premiership in 1973). Thompson went on to play five-eighth in Manly's 1976 Grand Final win over Parramatta, and their 1978 Grand Final win over Cronulla.

After Manly's 1978 premiership, Thompson was selected for the 1978 Kangaroo tour and made his test debut for Australia from the bench in the second Ashes series test against Great Britain at Bradford's Odsal Stadium. Thompson played from the bench in the Kangaroos' 18–14 loss to the Lions, but retained his place for the deciding test at Headingley where Australia won convincingly 23–6. He played another six tests in his career, with his last being the second test of the 1980 Trans-Tasman series against New Zealand at Carlaw Park in Auckland.

Thompson was selected to represent New South Wales as five-eighth on ten occasions, seven of which were State of Origin matches. He played in the inaugural 1980 game, the complete 1982 series, games I and II of the 1983 series and game I of the 1984 series, the final year of his playing career.

At the time of his retirement in 1984, Thompson held the record for the most Manly club games: 263 with 62 tries and two field goals.

=== Coaching ===
Thompson moved into coaching and took the Manly reserve grade side to the Grand Final in 1987 (losing to Penrith), before winning the Reserve Grade Grand Final in 1988. In 1989, following Bob Fulton's appointment as Australian coach, Thompson was appointed as first grade coach but a turbulent and unsettled year within the club which saw 1987 premiership and long serving Australian test players Dale Shearer, Noel Cleal and team captain Paul Vautin leave the club at season's end, led to a disappointing season for Thompson with Manly failing to make the finals and he was replaced at the end of the season by former New Zealand and Wigan coach Graham Lowe.
