= Tom Mooney (rugby league) =

Australian rugby league footballer

Personal information
- Born: 16 March 1951 (age 75) Coffs Harbour, New South Wales, Australia

Playing information
- Position: Wing
Club
| Years | Team | Pld | T | G | FG | P |
|---|---|---|---|---|---|---|
| 1972–74 | South Sydney | 61 | 29 | 0 | 0 | 87 |
| 1975–81 | Manly-Warringah | 163 | 83 | 0 | 0 | 249 |
| | Total | 224 | 112 | 0 | 0 | 336 |

Tom Mooney (born 16 March 1952) is an Australian former professional rugby league footballer who played in the 1970s. He played in Sydney's New South Wales Rugby Football League premiership as a wing for the Manly-Warringah and South Sydney clubs. Mooney won the 1976 and 1978 premierships with Manly.

== Career ==
Born in Coffs Harbour, New South Wales, Mooney was a junior winger for Wauchope. He joined South Sydney in 1972. He played three seasons with the Rabbitohs before joining Manly-Warringah in 1975. At the end of the 1976 NSWRFL season Mooney played in Manly's Grand Final-winning side which defeated Parramatta 13–10. He was also the 1976 season's top try-scorer, equal with teammate and Manly's captain Bob Fulton with both scoring 18 tries in the regular season, though Fulton would score another 3 tries in the finals series.

Mooney scored a try in the 1978 NSWRFL season's Grand Final against Cronulla-Sutherland, which was drawn 11-all and had to be re-played just three days later. Manly would go on to win the replay 16-0.. After playing in Manly's premiership team, Mooney was considered unlucky not to gain a place on the 1978 Kangaroo tour. Seven of his teammates did tour, as did Manly coach Frank Stanton who was the head coach of the Kangaroos.

Tom Mooney would also go on to be the 1979 NSWRFL season's top try scorer.

In 1990 Mooney was named on the wing in a Manly team made up of the best players in the club's history. He was one of the few exceptional players that failed to represent either his state or country.

Former Manly teammate Paul "Fatty" Vautin told in his biography "The Strife and Times of Paul Vautin that during the 1981 NSWRFL season, Mooney was considered to be in a form slump after not having scored a try in the first six games of the season (of which Manly had only won two). Before Manly's Round 7 match against South Sydney at Manly's home ground Brookvale Oval, a fired up Mooney all but ordered teammates to get him the ball during the game. Mooney went on to score two tries as the Sea Eagles won 21–13. Ironically it would be another 10 games before he crossed for another try. He scored a total of 9 tries for the season and retired from playing at the end of the year.
