= Rod Jackson (rugby league) =

Australian rugby league footballer

Personal information
- Full name: Rod Jackson
- Born: 11 November 1951 (age 74) Goulburn, New South Wales, Australia

Playing information
- Position: Wing
Club
Years	Team	Pld	T	G	FG	P
1971–72	Canterbury-Bankstown	12	3	0	0	9
1971	→Hull Kingston Rovers	2	0	0	0	0
1973–77	Manly Warringah	62	23	0	0	69
	Total	76	26	0	0	78
- Source: Whiticker/Hudson As of 11 Jun 2024

Rod Jackson (born 11 November 1951) is an Australian rugby league footballer who played in the 1970s for Canterbury-Bankstown and Manly Warringah as a winger.

== Early life ==
Jackson was born and raised in Goulburn, New South Wales, Australia

== Playing career ==
Jackson began his first grade career with Canterbury-Bankstown in 1971 making his debut against South Sydney. Jackson spent most of his time for Canterbury playing in reserve grade and third grade winning the reserve grade premierships in 1971 and 1972. With opportunities limited at Canterbury, Jackson joined Manly-Warringah in 1973. Jackson went on to score 4 tries for Manly in his first season at the club but was not a part of the premiership winning team that year against Cronulla. Jackson featured more for the club in 1974 and 1975 playing in the club's unsuccessful finals campaigns.

In 1976, Jackson was a member of the Manly side which won the minor premiership and then the premiership itself defeating Parramatta 13-10 in the 1976 grand final with Jackson playing on the wing. Jackson went on to play one more season with Manly before retiring at the end of 1977.
