= Neville Glover =

Australian rugby league footballer (1955–2026)

Neville Glover OAM
Personal information
- Full name: Neville Kenneth Glover
- Born: 22 July 1955 Sydney, New South Wales, Australia
- Died: 2 April 2026 (aged 70)

Playing information
- Position: Wing
Club
| Years | Team | Pld | T | G | FG | P |
|---|---|---|---|---|---|---|
| 1975–1981 | Parramatta Eels | 121 | 54 | 0 | 0 | 152 |
| 1983 | Penrith Panthers | 11 | 4 | 0 | 0 | 16 |
| | Total | 132 | 58 | 0 | 0 | 168 |
Representative
| Years | Team | Pld | T | G | FG | P |
| 1978 | Australia | 2 | 2 | 0 | 0 | 6 |
| 1978 | New South Wales | 1 | 0 | 0 | 0 | 0 |
| 1980 | City NSW | 1 | 0 | 0 | 0 | 0 |

Neville Kenneth Glover OAM (22 July 1955 – 2 April 2026) was an Australian professional rugby league footballer who played in the 1970s and 1980s. A New South Wales interstate and Australia international representative wing, he played his club football in the NSWRL Premiership with the Parramatta Eels and Penrith Panthers.

== Playing career ==
A Seven Hills junior, Glover made his debut for Parramatta in 1975. The following year Parramatta reached the grand final which was played against Manly-Warringah. With ten minutes of the match remaining and 15 metres out from a wide-open try line Glover dropped the ball over the line after Parramatta started a sweeping move from one side of the field to the other. Speaking in 2008 about the game, Glover said "Mate I'm at a prosecutors' conference today and the dropped ball thing has already been mentioned twice, I wouldn't say it gets brought up daily but certainly once a week it gets a mention". Glover dropped the pass which could have given the Eels the match-winning try.

In 1978, Glover made his Australian test debut in Brisbane against a touring New Zealand side in the second of a three-test series. He scored the first of his two tries of the match after being on the field for only two minutes. He is listed on the Australian Players Register as Kangaroo No. 511. During the 1979 Great Britain Lions tour Glover represented New South Wales in the match they hosted against Great Britain.

Following a grand final loss in reserve grade, Glover left Parramatta. He played one more season with Penrith in 1983.

== Post playing ==
After playing, Glover went into coaching and later became a police officer. Glover became the senior sergeant in charge of all Hunter Region police prosecutors.

Glover died after a short illness on 2 April 2026, at the age of 70.

== Accolades ==
In 2002, a team of the greatest Parramatta players, known as the Parramatta Legends, was selected based on a public vote of fans. Glover was selected on the wing.

He was awarded the Australian Sports Medal in 2000, and the Medal of the Order of Australia ‌in 2018 for services to rugby league and the community.
