= 1984 Cronulla-Sutherland Sharks season =

- NSWRL rank: 10th
- 1984 record: Wins: 10; draws: 1; losses: 13
- Points scored: For: 446 (72 tries, 79 goals); against: 478 (78 tries, 83 goals)

Team information
- Coach: Terry Fearnley
- Captain: David Hatch Greg Nixon
- Stadium: Endeavour Field
- Avg. attendance: 5,049

Top scorers
- Tries: Dean Carney (12)
- Goals: Tony Armstrong (75)
- Points: Tony Armstrong (186)
← 1983	1985 →

The 1984 Cronulla-Sutherland Sharks season was the eighteenth in the club's history. They competed in the NSWRFL's 1984 Winfield Cup premiership as well as the 1984 National Panasonic Cup.

== Ladder ==
	Team	Pld	W	D	L	B	PF	PA	PD	Pts
1	Canterbury-Bankstown	24	19	0	5	2	435	237	+198	42
2	St. George	24	17	0	7	2	445	289	+156	38
3	Parramatta	24	17	0	7	2	412	260	+152	38
4	Manly-Warringah	24	14	0	10	2	512	338	+174	32
5	South Sydney	24	13	0	11	2	333	307	+26	30
6	Canberra	24	13	0	11	2	379	394	-15	30
7	Penrith	24	12	1	11	2	409	401	+8	29
8	Illawarra	24	12	0	12	2	368	388	-20	28
9	Balmain	24	12	0	12	2	380	405	-25	28
10	Cronulla-Sutherland	24	10	1	13	2	446	478	-32	25
11	North Sydney	24	9	1	14	2	371	447	-76	23
12	Eastern Suburbs	24	5	1	18	2	308	478	-170	15
13	Western Suburbs	24	1	0	23	2	244	620	-376	6
