= 1984 NSWRL season =

Rugby league competition

1984 New South Wales Rugby League
- Teams: 13
- Premiers: Canterbury-Bankstown (4th title)
- Minor premiers: Canterbury-Bankstown (4th title)
- Matches played: 163
- Points scored: 5,226
- Total attendance: 1,379,655
- Top points scorer: Steve Gearin (190)
- Wooden spoon: Western Suburbs (13th spoon)
- Rothmans Medal: Terry Lamb
- Top try-scorer(s): Steve Morris (17); Terry Lamb (17)

The 1984 New South Wales Rugby League season was the 77th season of competition between the top professional rugby league football clubs within New South Wales. With the departure from the first grade competition of Sydney foundation club the Newtown Jets at the close of the previous season, 1984 saw thirteen teams compete for the J J Giltinan Shield and Winfield Cup during the season, which culminated in a grand final between the Canterbury-Bankstown and Parramatta clubs. NSWRL teams also competed for the 1984 National Panasonic Cup.

== Season summary ==
The New South Wales Rugby Football League dropped the "football" from its name this year. Twenty-six regular season rounds were played from March till August, resulting in a top five of Canterbury, St. George, Parramatta and Manly, with Souths taking fifth spot after winning a play-off against Canberra

The 1984 season's Rothmans Medallist was Canterbury-Bankstown's five-eighth, Terry Lamb, who was also the season's top try-scorer. The Dally M Award was given to Canterbury's fullback, Michael Potter, while Rugby League Week gave their player of the year award to Parramatta's halfback, Peter Sterling.

=== Teams ===
At the close of the previous season Newtown became the first club since University in 1937 to exit the League, reducing the number of clubs this season from fourteen to thirteen. This included five Sydney-based foundation teams, another six from Sydney, one from greater New South Wales and one from the Australian Capital Territory.

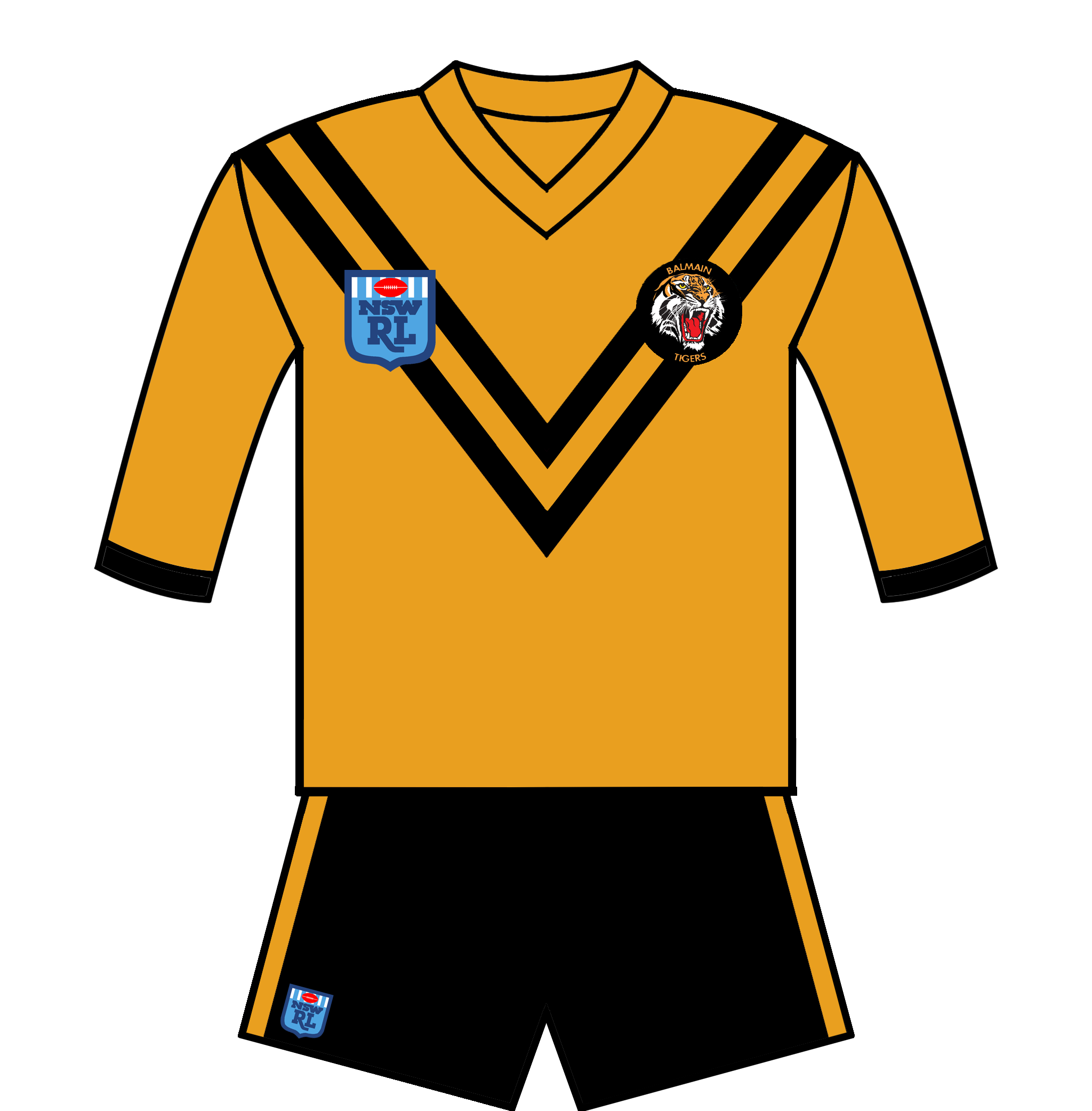
Balmain Tigers 77th season Ground: Leichhardt Oval; Coach: Frank Stanton; Captain: Wayne Pearce

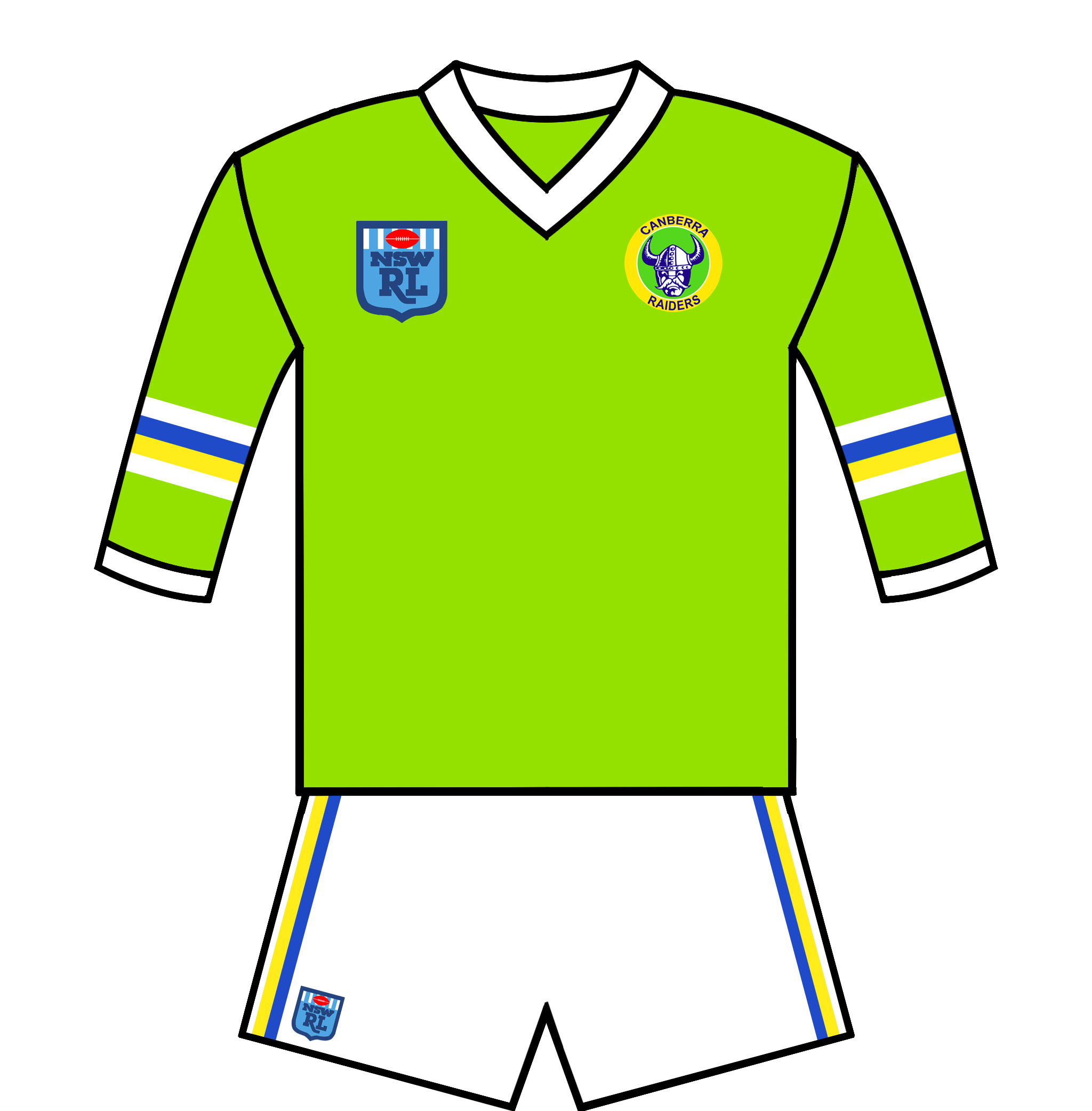
Canberra Raiders 3rd season Ground: Seiffert Oval; Coach: Don Furner; Captain: Ron Giteau

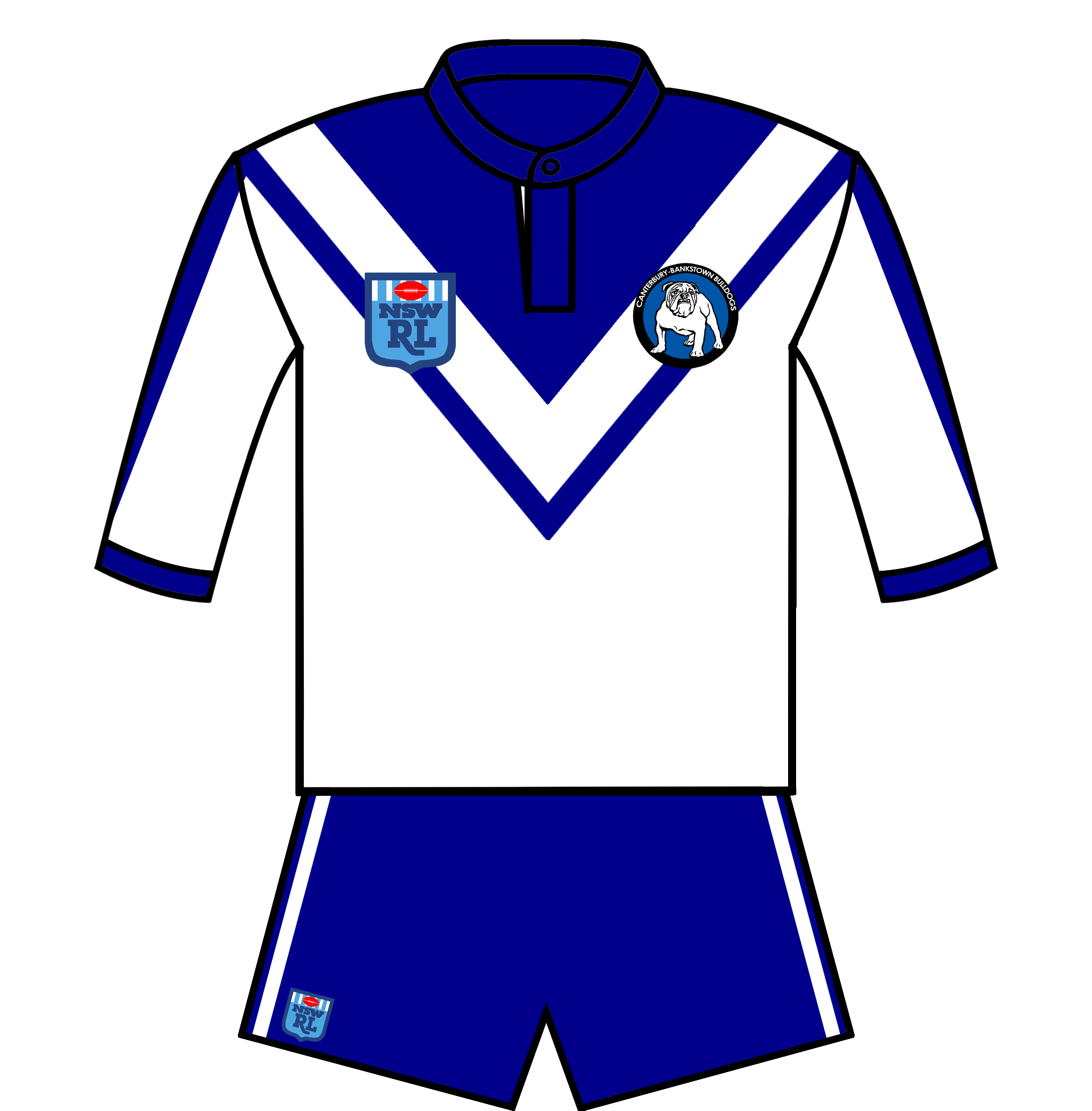
Canterbury-Bankstown Bulldogs 50th season Ground: Belmore Oval; Coach: Warren Ryan; Captain: Chris Anderson→Terry Lamb→Steve Mortimer

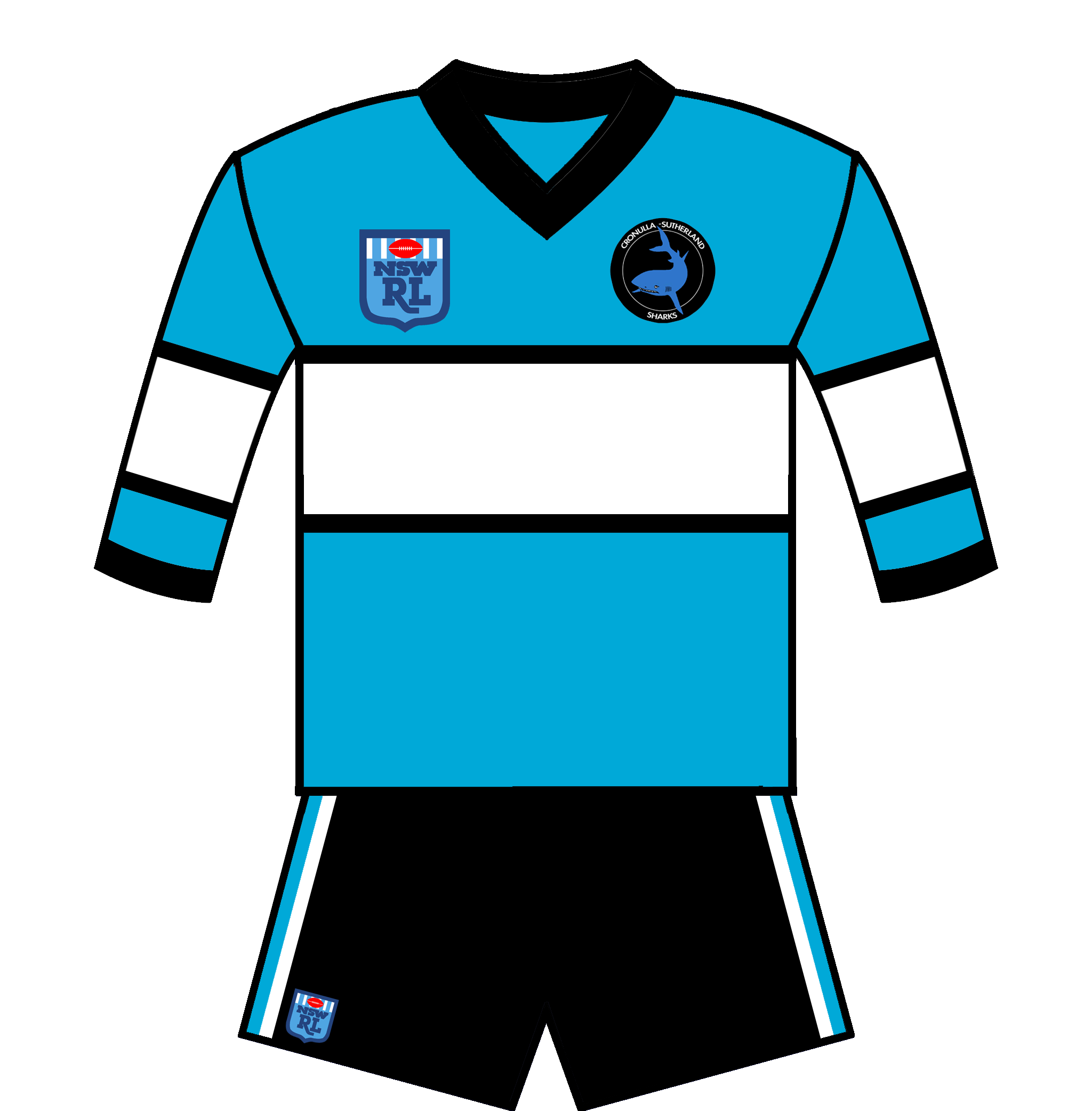
Cronulla-Sutherland Sharks 18th season Ground: Ronson Field; Coach: Terry Fearnley; Captain: David Hatch

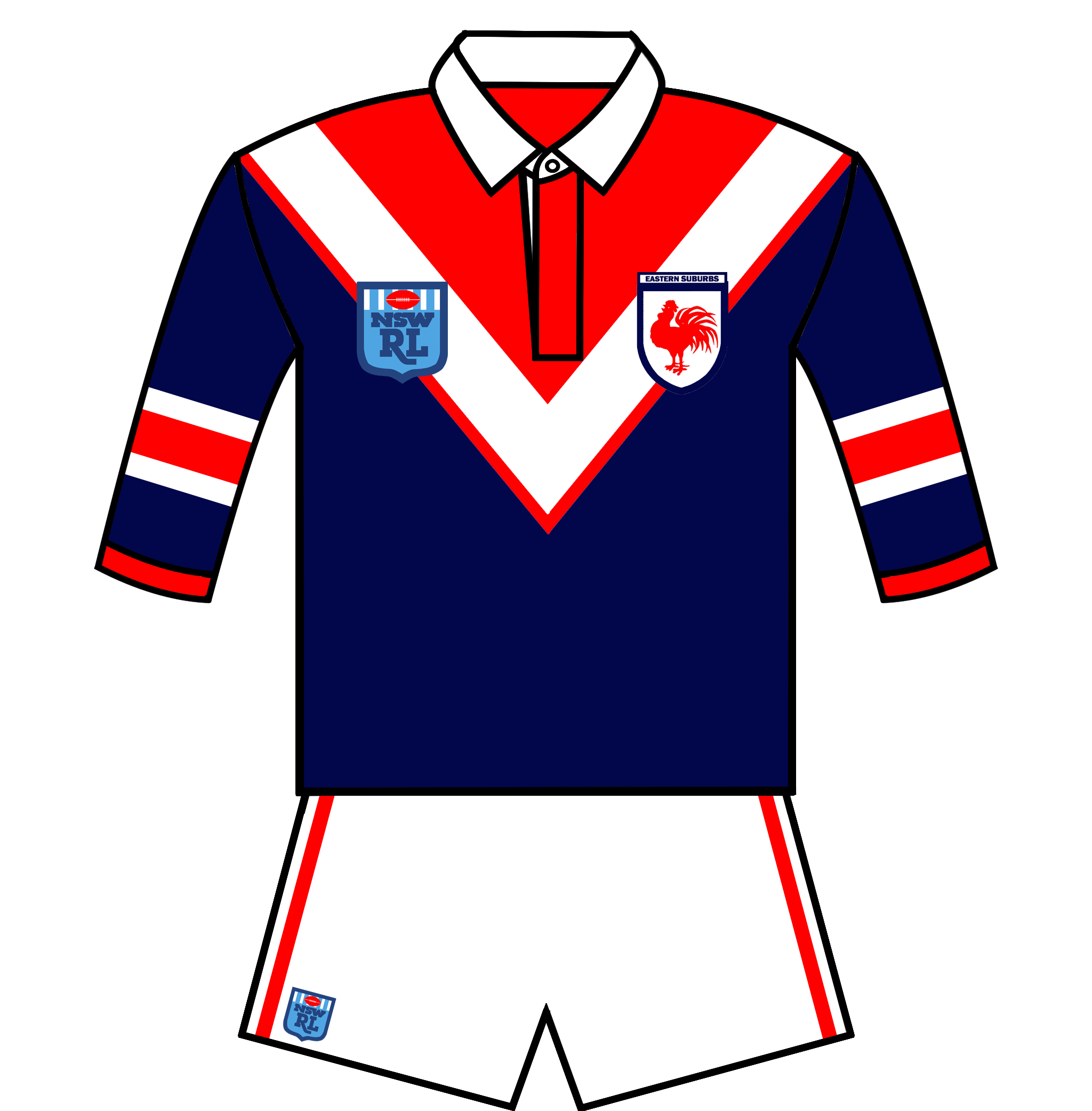
Eastern Suburbs Roosters 77th season Ground: Sydney Sports Ground; Coach: Laurie Freier; Captain: Ron Gibbs

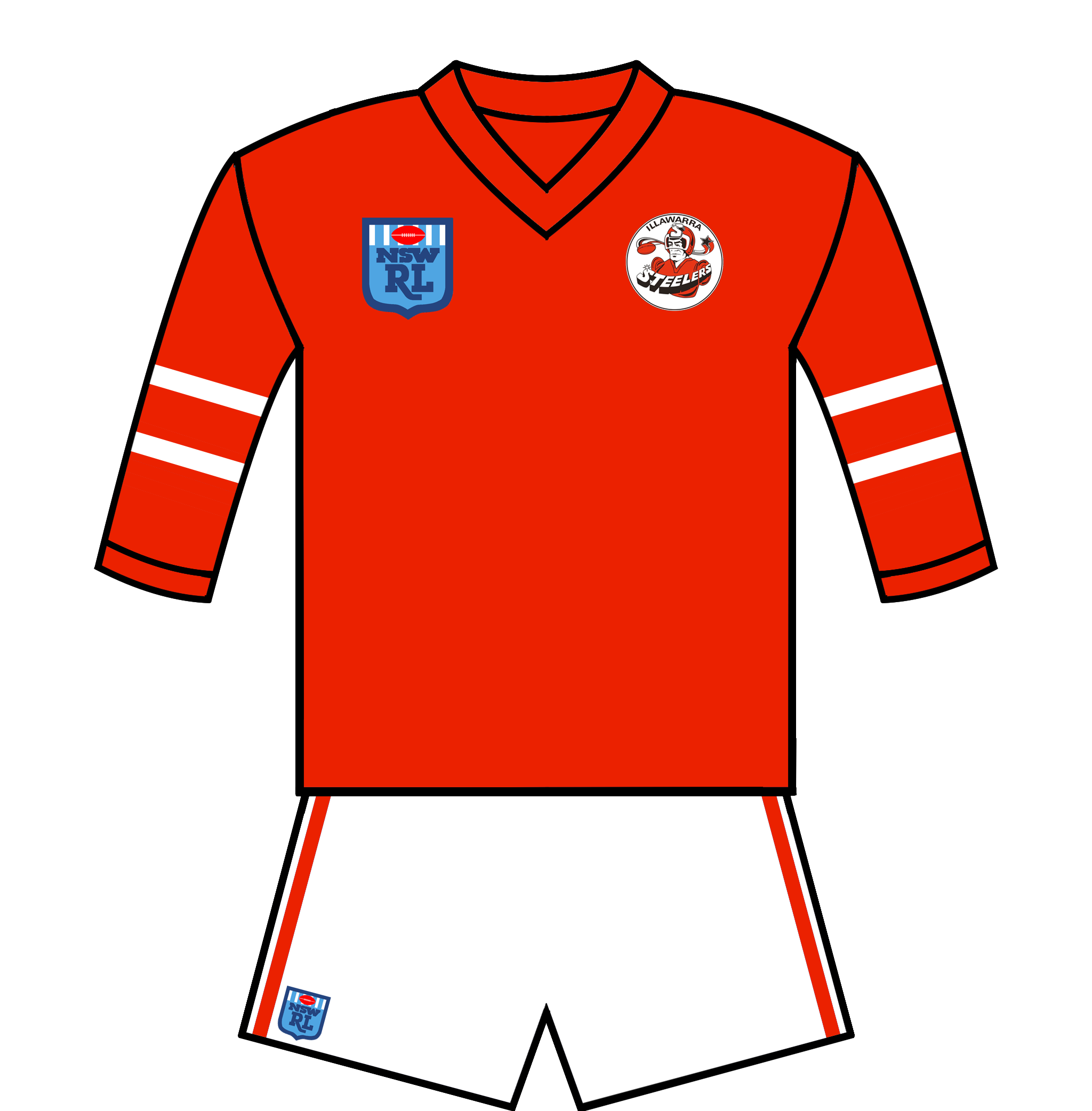
Illawarra Steelers 3rd season Ground: Wollongong Showground; Coach: Brian Smith; Captain: Michael Bolt

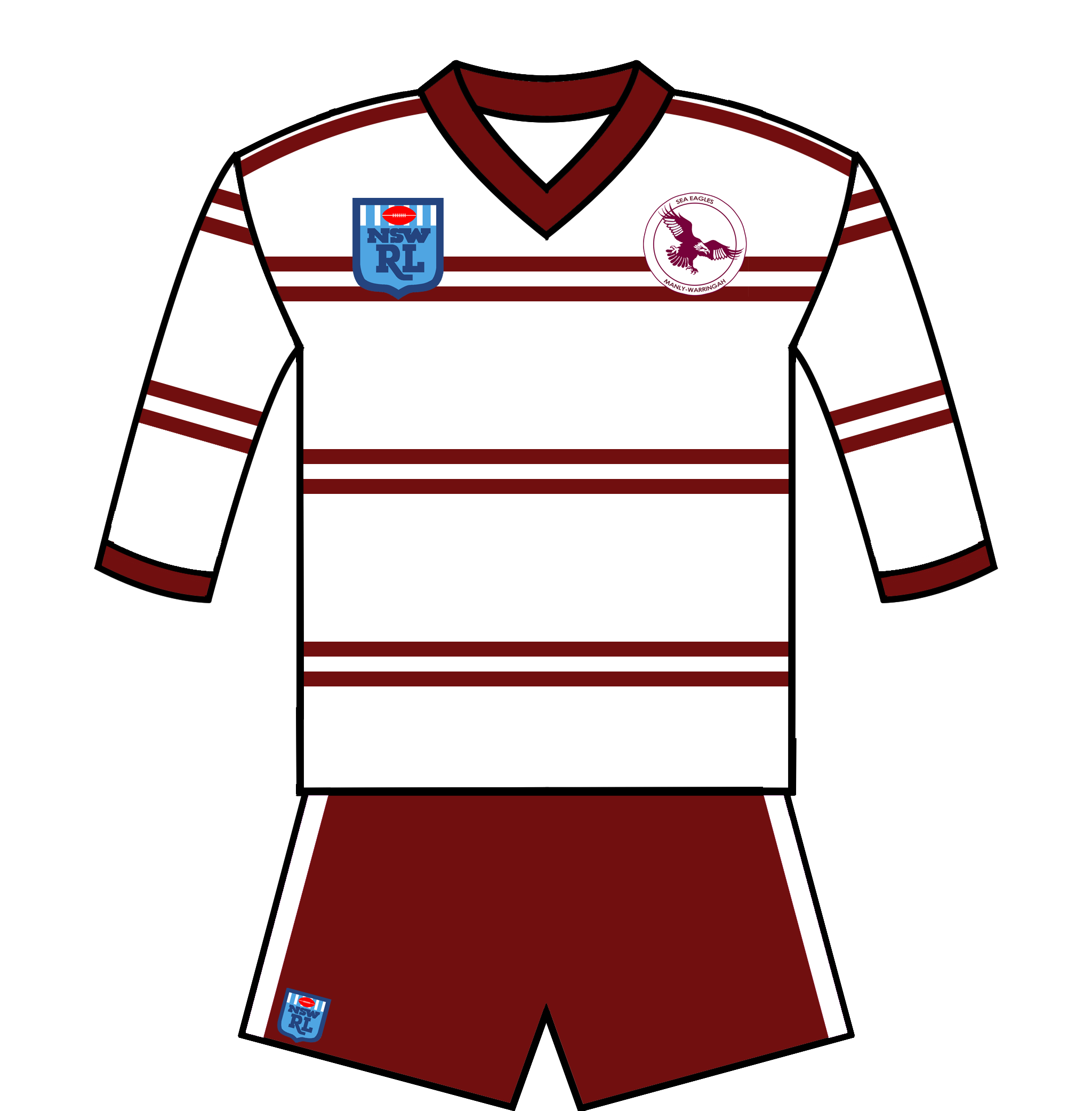
Manly-Warringah Sea Eagles 38th season Ground: Brookvale Oval; Coach: Bob Fulton; Captain: Alan Thompson

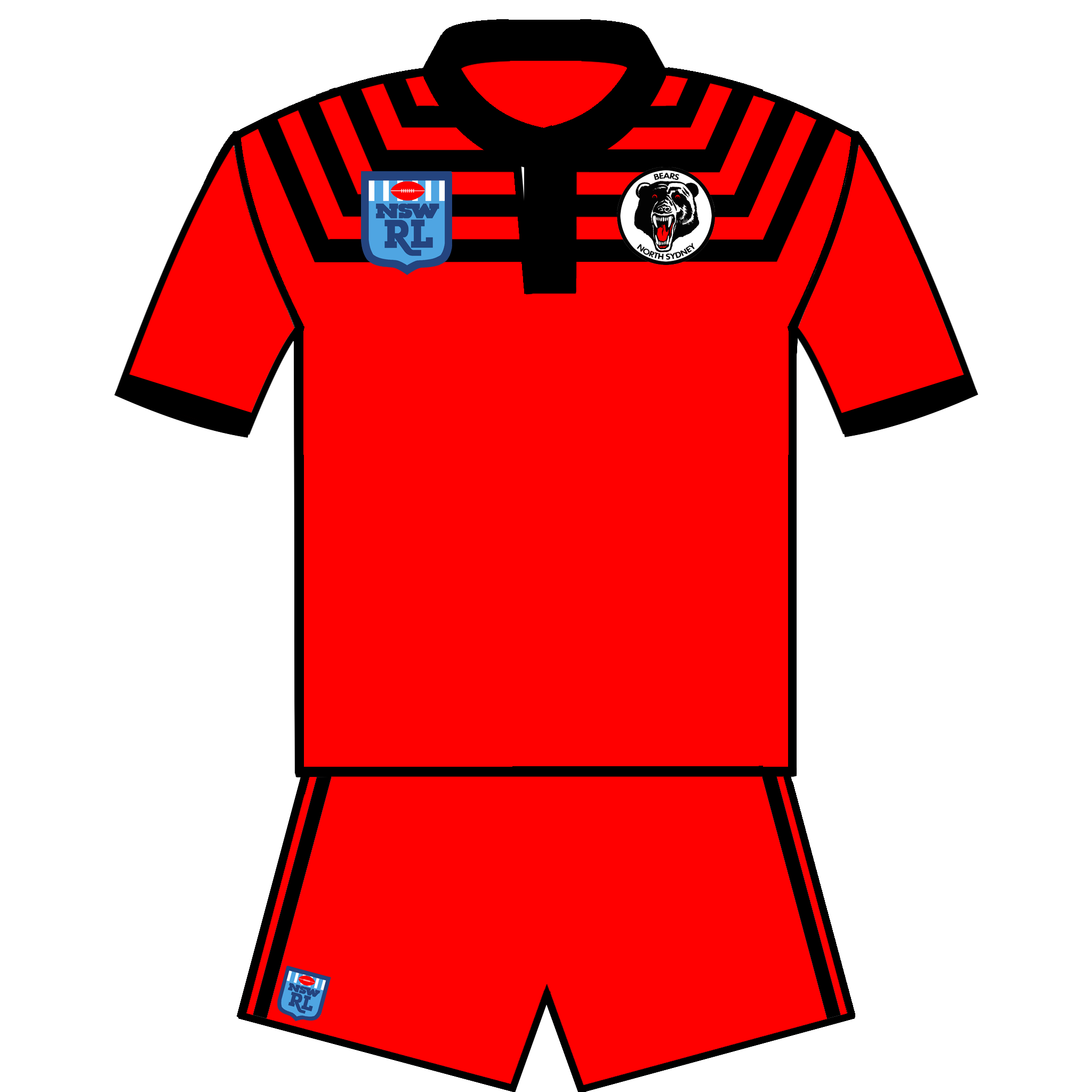
North Sydney Bears 77th season Ground: North Sydney Oval; Coach: Greg Hawick; Captain: Fred Teasdell→Mark Graham

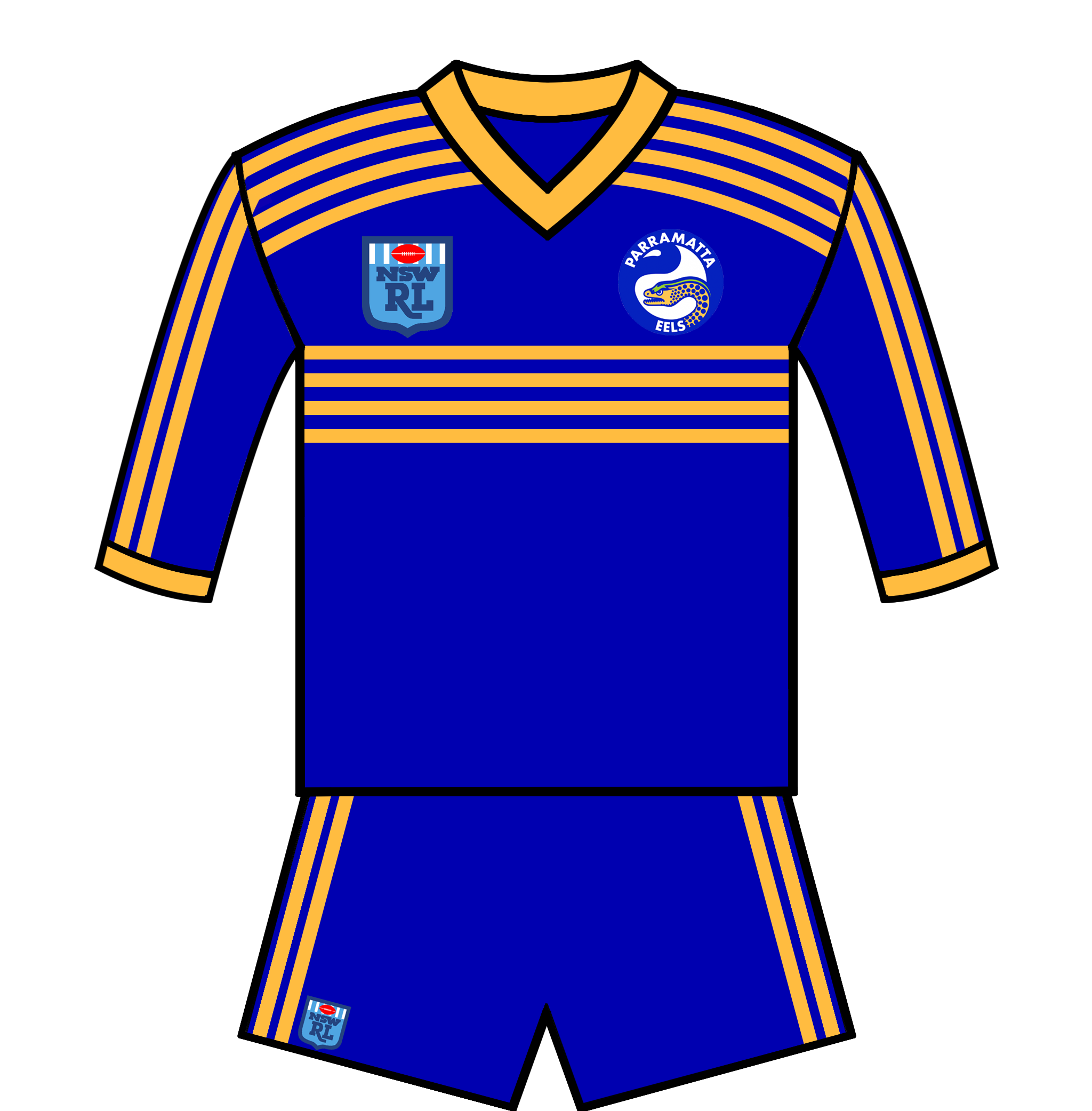
Parramatta Eels 38th season Ground: Belmore Oval; Coach: John Monie; Captain: Ray Price

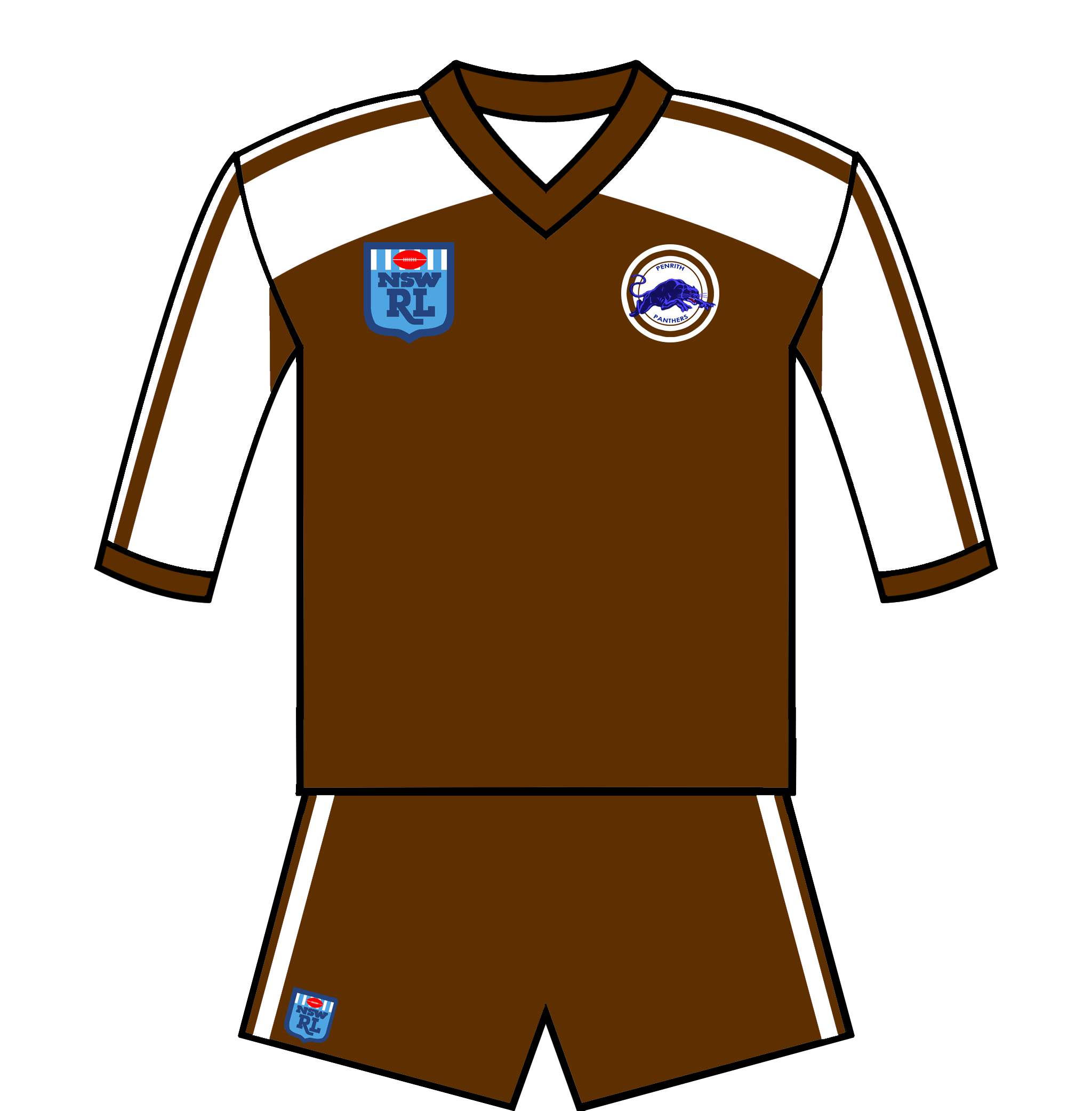
Penrith Panthers 18th season Ground: Penrith Park; Coach: Tim Sheens; Captain: Royce Simmons

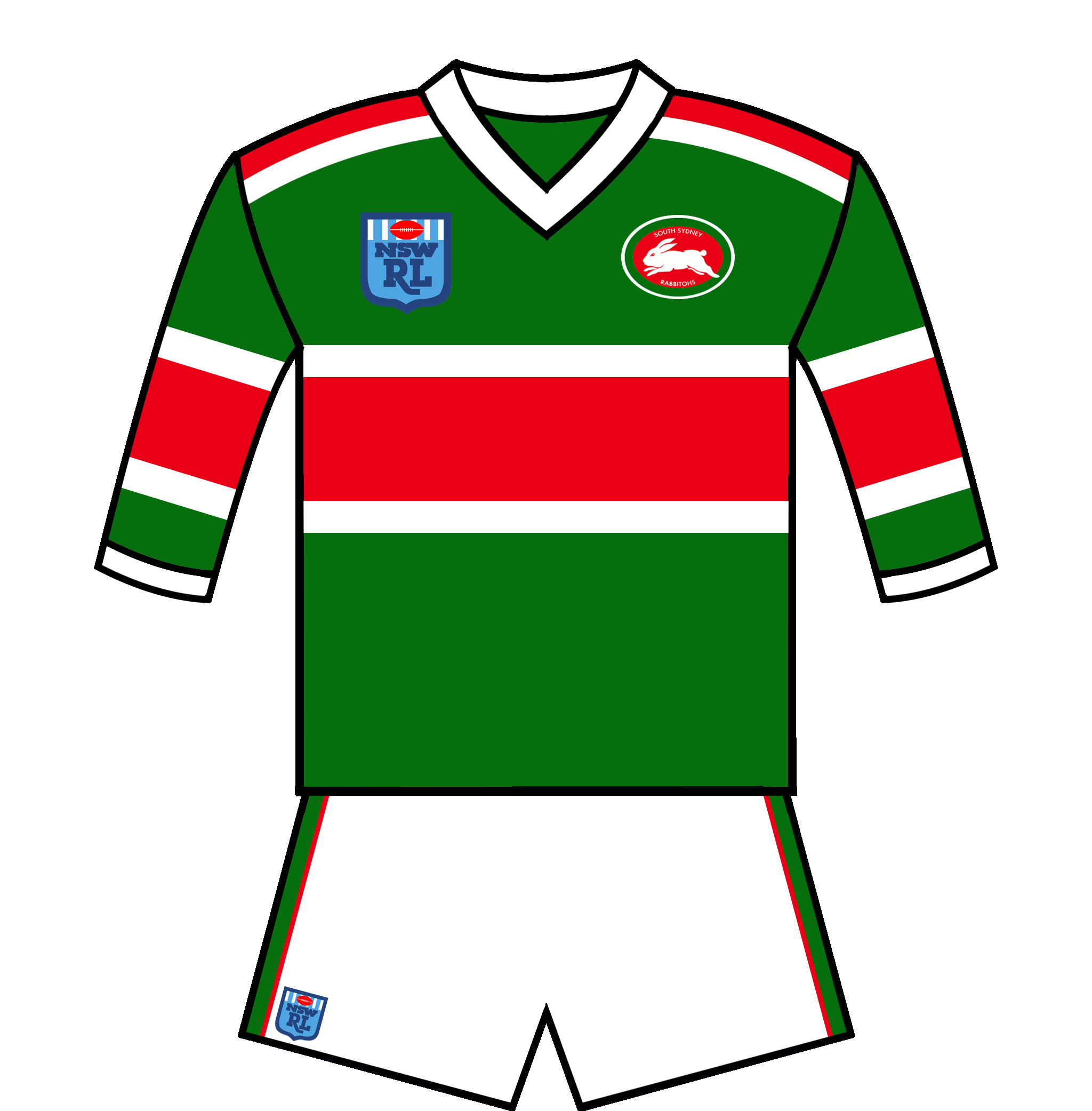
South Sydney Rabbitohs 77th season Ground: Redfern Oval; Coach: Ron Willey; Captain: Ziggy Niszczot

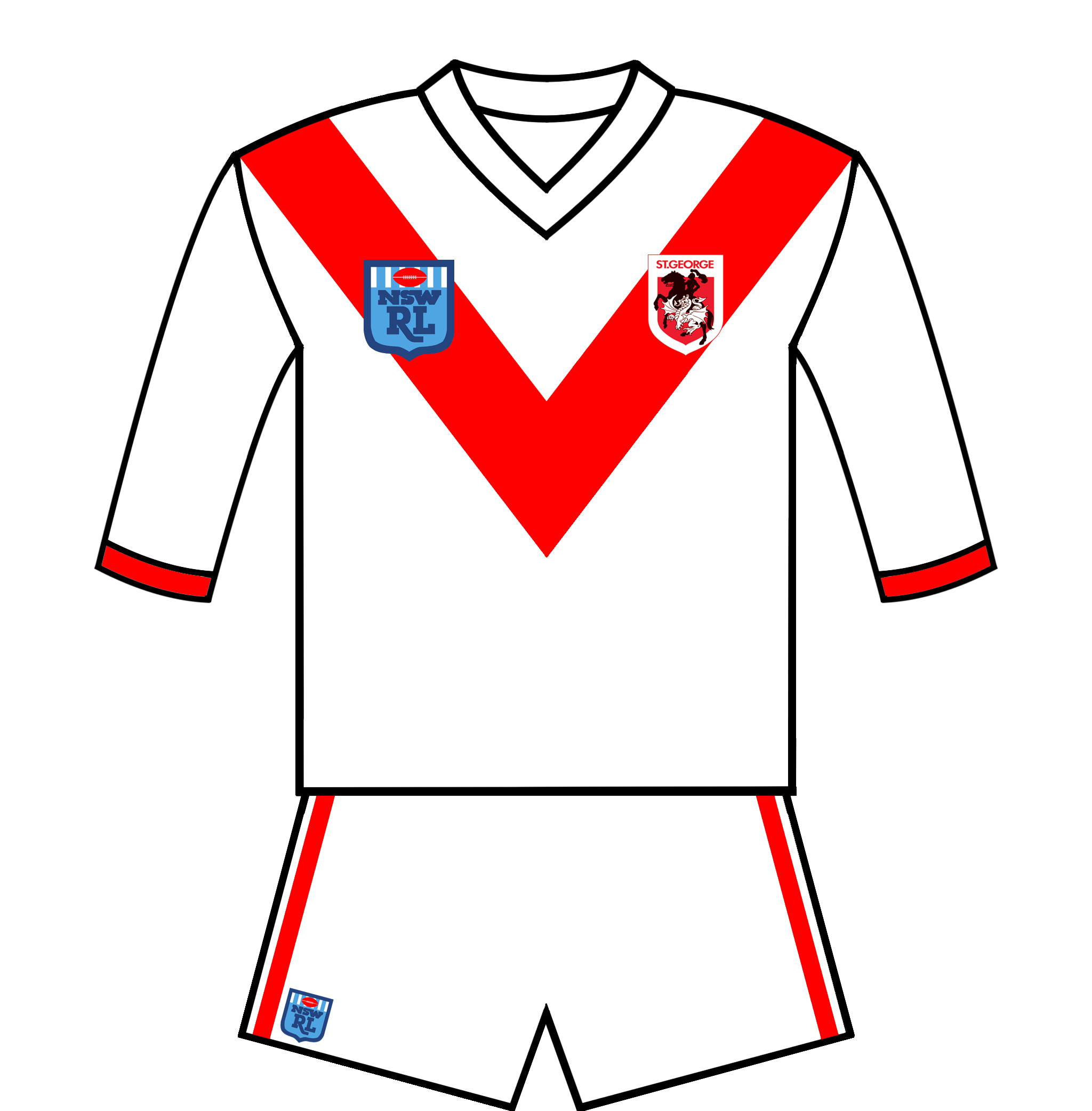
St. George Dragons 64th season Ground: Kogarah Oval; Coach: Roy Masters; Captain: Craig Young

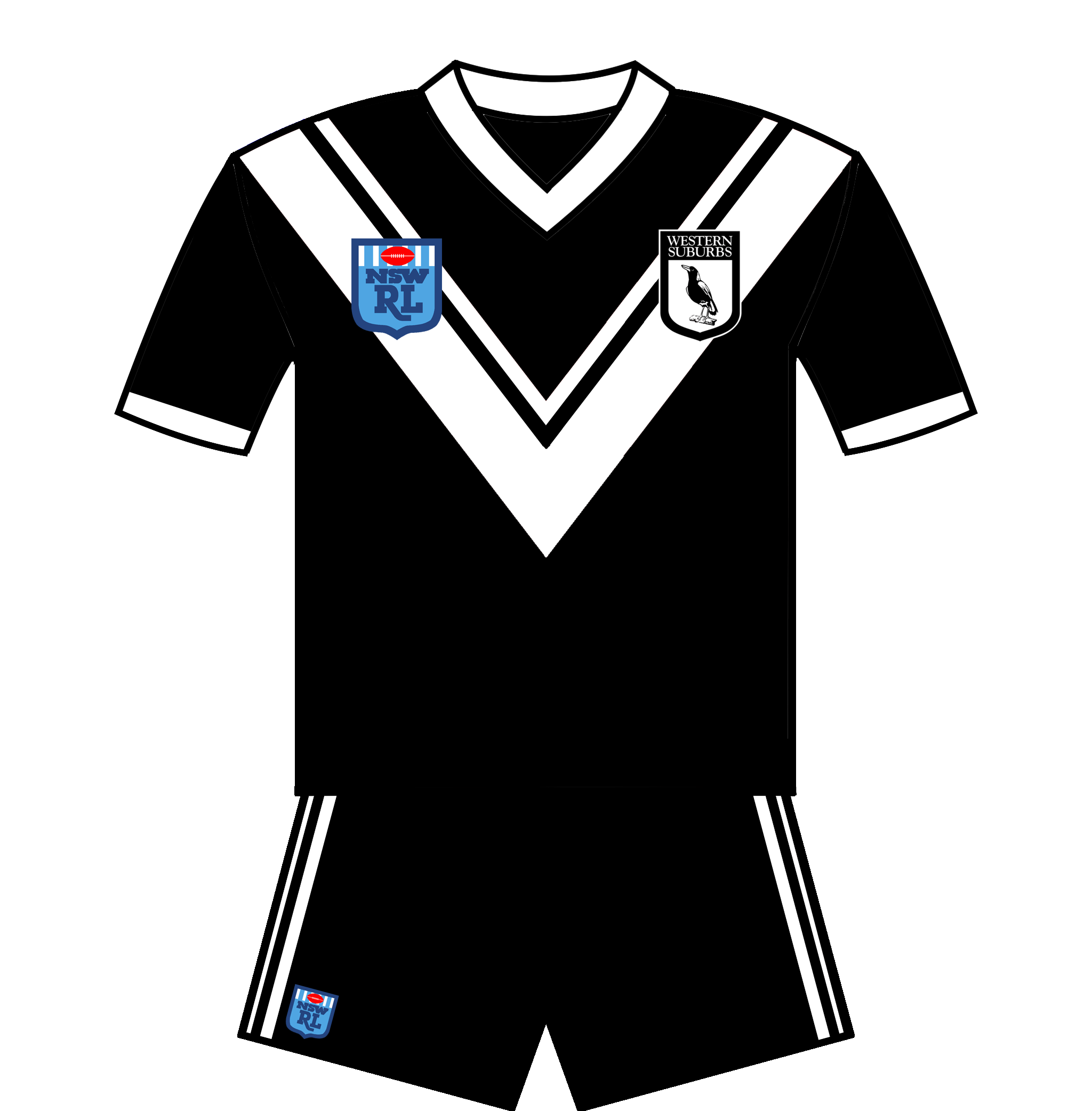
Western Suburbs Magpies 77th season Ground: Lidcombe Oval; Coach: Ken Gentle; Captain: Lee Crooks

=== Ladder ===
	Team	Pld	W	D	L	B	PF	PA	PD	Pts
1	Canterbury	24	19	0	5	2	435	237	+198	42
2	St. George	24	17	0	7	2	445	289	+156	38
3	Parramatta	24	17	0	7	2	412	260	+152	38
4	Manly	24	14	0	10	2	512	338	+174	32
5	South Sydney	24	13	0	11	2	333	307	+26	30
6	Canberra	24	13	0	11	2	379	394	-15	30
7	Penrith	24	12	1	11	2	409	401	+8	29
8	Illawarra	24	12	0	12	2	368	388	-20	28
9	Balmain	24	12	0	12	2	380	405	-25	28
10	Cronulla	24	10	1	13	2	446	478	-32	25
11	North Sydney	24	9	1	14	2	371	447	-76	23
12	Eastern Suburbs	24	5	1	18	2	308	478	-170	15
13	Western Suburbs	24	1	0	23	2	244	620	-376	6

== Finals ==
Home	Score	Away	Match Information
Home	Score	Away	Date and Time	Venue	Referee	Crowd
Playoff
South Sydney Rabbitohs	23-4	Canberra Raiders	28 August 1984	Sydney Cricket Ground	Greg McCallum	10,101
Qualifying Finals
Manly-Warringah Sea Eagles	18-22	South Sydney Rabbitohs	1 September 1984	Sydney Cricket Ground	Chris Ward	15,801
St. George Dragons	16-22	Parramatta Eels	2 September 1984	Sydney Cricket Ground	Kevin Roberts	25,675
Semi-finals
St. George Dragons	24-6	South Sydney Rabbitohs	8 September 1984	Sydney Cricket Ground	B. Barnes	32,162
Canterbury-Bankstown Bulldogs	16-8	Parramatta Eels	9 September 1984	Sydney Cricket Ground	Greg McCallum	30,044
Preliminary final
Parramatta Eels	8-7	St. George Dragons	16 September 1984	Sydney Cricket Ground	Kevin Roberts	37,004

=== Chart ===
Qualifying final
2	St. George	16
3	Parramatta	22
4	Manly	18
5	South Sydney	22

Major semi-final
1	Canterbury	16
Parramatta	8
Minor semi-final
St. George	24
South Sydney	6

Preliminary final
Parramatta	8
St. George	7

Grand final
Canterbury	6
Parramatta	4

=== Grand final ===
The 1984 grand final was contested by minor premiers Canterbury-Bankstown Bulldogs and the Parramatta Eels. As competition leaders, the Bulldogs needed to win only one finals game to qualify for the grand final, and did so against the third-placed Eels, who had to play three finals games to qualify. Played at the Sydney Cricket Ground before a crowd of 47,076, the game was refereed by Kevin Roberts.

Canterbury-Bankstown Bulldogs	Position	Parramatta Eels
1. Mick Potter	FB	1. Paul Taylor
2. Peter Mortimer	WG	2. Neil Hunt
3. Andrew Farrar	CE	3. Mick Cronin
4. Chris Mortimer	CE	4. Steve Ella
5. Steve O’Brien	WG	5. Eric Grothe
6. Terry Lamb	FE	6. Brett Kenny
7. Steve Mortimer (c)	HB	7. Peter Sterling
8. Paul Langmack	LK	8. Ray Price
9. Steve Folkes	SR	9. Chris Phelan
16. Brian Battese	SR	10. John Muggleton
11. Peter Kelly	PR	11. Paul Mares
12. Mark Bugden	HK	12. Steve Edge (c)
13. Peter Tunks	PR	13. Stan Jurd
10. Darryl Brohman	Res.	15. David Liddiard
20. Greg Mullane	Res.	17. Glenn Mansfield
22. Geoff Robinson	Res.	20. Ron Quinn
	Res.	22. Steve Sharp
Warren Ryan	Coach	John Monie

The ruthless game plan of coach Warren Ryan saw Canterbury trump Parramatta in a grueling encounter. The Bulldogs mastered the art of the "gang-tackle" under Ryan and it was executed superbly by Peter Tunks, Peter Kelly, Mark Bugden and Brian Battese. Parramatta had a 4-0 half-time lead after Mick Cronin scored from a neat Peter Sterling pass.

An ingenious moment from Canterbury hooker Bugden won the day - seeing an injured Ray Price on the ground, he ran from dummy-half at the place where Price would have been defending to crash over and score the winning try.

Cronin later missed a close range penalty goal attempt which would have levelled the scores close to full-time.

Canterbury-Bankstown 6
Tries: Bugden
Goals: Chris Mortimer

Parramatta 4
Tries: Cronin

Man-of-the-match: Peter Kelly

== Player statistics ==
The following statistics are as of the conclusion of Round 26.

Top 5 point scorers

Points	Player	Tries	Goals	Field goals
186	Tony Armstrong	9	75	0
176	Steve Gearin	7	74	0
159	Ron Giteau	6	67	1
143	Neil Baker	5	59	5
142	Mark Levy	2	67	0

Top 5 try scorers

Tries	Player
17	Terry Lamb
13	Steve Morris
12	Dean Carney
12	Steve Broughton
11	Eric Grothe Sr.
11	Phil Blake
11	Brad Izzard

Top 5 goal scorers

Goals	Player
75	Tony Armstrong
74	Steve Gearin
67	Ron Giteau
67	Mark Levy
59	Neil Baker
