= 1985 Cronulla-Sutherland Sharks season =

- NSWRL rank: 8th
- 1985 record: Wins: 11; draws: 0; losses: 13
- Points scored: For: 440 (72 tries, 76 goals); against: 404 (66 tries, 69 goals, 2 field goals)

Team information
- Coach: Jack Gibson
- Captain: David Hatch
- Stadium: Ronson Field
- Avg. attendance: 6,384

Top scorers
- Tries: Dean Carney (11)
- Goals: Dean Carney (75)
- Points: Dean Carney (194)
← 1984	1986 →

The 1985 Cronulla-Sutherland Sharks season was the nineteenth in the club's history. They competed in the NSWRL's 1985 Winfield Cup premiership as well as the 1985 National Panasonic Cup, in which they reached the final.

== Ladder ==
	Team	Pld	W	D	L	B	PF	PA	PD	Pts
1	St. George	24	18	2	4	2	470	264	+206	42
2	Balmain	24	18	0	6	2	494	304	+190	40
3	Canterbury-Bankstown	24	16	2	6	2	435	267	+168	38
4	Parramatta	24	16	0	8	2	458	311	+147	36
5	Penrith	24	13	1	10	2	460	379	+81	31
6	Manly-Warringah	24	13	1	10	2	404	345	+59	31
7	Eastern Suburbs	24	10	3	11	2	374	389	-15	27
8	Cronulla-Sutherland	24	11	0	13	2	440	404	+36	26
9	South Sydney	24	10	0	14	2	373	419	-46	24
10	Canberra	24	8	2	14	2	432	534	-102	22
11	North Sydney	24	6	1	17	2	281	491	-210	17
12	Western Suburbs	24	5	2	17	2	311	661	-350	16
13	Illawarra	24	5	0	19	2	303	467	-164	14
