= Tony Armstrong (disambiguation) =

Tony Armstrong (born 1989) is an Australian television presenter and former professional Australian rules footballer.

Tony Armstrong may refer to:

- Tony Armstrong (rugby league) (born 1958), rugby league footballer of the 1980s

== See also ==
- Antony Armstrong-Jones, 1st Earl of Snowdon (1930–2017) was a British photographer and filmmaker
- Anthony Armstrong (disambiguation)
