= Steve Sharp (rugby league) =

Australian rugby league footballer & administrators

Personal information
- Full name: Steve Brian Sharp
- Born: 11 September 1957 (age 69) Paddington, New South Wales

Playing information
- Position: Second-row
Club
Years	Team	Pld	T	G	FG	P
1979–90	Parramatta Eels	164	7	0	0	27

Steve Sharp (born 11 September 1957) is an Australian rugby league football administrator and former professional player, who was previously chairman of the Parramatta Eels club, with whom he played and won three premierships in the 1980s.

== Playing career ==
Sharp started playing in Sydney's New South Wales Rugby Football League Premiership for the Parramatta Eels club during the 1979 NSWRFL season. He was selected as one of Parramatta's reserves in the 1981 NSWRFL season's grand final, in which they defeated Newtown to claim their maiden premiership.

Sharp was selected to play for the Eels at second-row forward in the 1982 NSWRFL season's grand final victory over the Manly-Warringah Sea Eagles. At the end of the 1983 NSWRFL season Parramatta again faced Manly in the grand final and again Sharp played at second-row forward in the Eels victory, making it three consecutive premierships for the club. He was selected to play for the Eels as a reserve in the 1984 NSWRL season's grand final which was lost to the Canterbury-Bankstown Bulldogs.

When the newly-build Parramatta Stadium hosted its first match in 1986, Sharp scored the first try there. The 1990 NSWRL season was his last in first grade.

== Post-playing ==
In May 2013 Sharp was elected Chairman of the Parramatta Eels board, replacing Roy Spagnolo. In 2016, Parramatta were involved in a salary cap scandal where it was revealed that secret payments to players had been made and that the club had been over the cap since 2013. Sharp along with what the media dubbed "The gang of five" were deregistered by The NRL in the fallout of the scandal.

In August 2016, Sharp spoke to the media saying "I'm totally disappointed in the NRL's decision in finding me guilty of being part of a system that defrauded the salary cap, That never happened, but I have to live by the decisions of the NRL, I'm not saying it didn't occur I'm saying that I didn't have the knowledge at the time that this stuff was happening, I don't apologise for something I wasn't aware of, I've lost the love of the game over the last 18 months, I still love Parramatta and I care about the club but I've lost the love of the game, and going back to my earliest memory, I've always had it. That's sad".
