= Anthony Armstrong =

Anthony Armstrong may refer to:

- Anthony Armstrong (American football) (born 1983), American football player
- Anthony Armstrong (writer) (1897–1972), Anglo-Canadian writer
- Anthony Toruariki Armstrong (1957–2018), Cook Islands politician
- Anthony Armstrong (musician) (1949–1996), American country music singer

== See also ==
- Antony Armstrong-Jones, 1st Earl of Snowdon (1930–2017), British photographer and film maker
- Tony Armstrong (disambiguation)
