= Brian Battese =

Australian rugby league footballer (born 1961)

Personal information
- Born: 25 March 1961 (age 64)

Playing information
- Height: 183 cm (6 ft 0 in)
- Weight: 95 kg (14 st 13 lb)
- Position: Second-row
Club
Years	Team	Pld	T	G	FG	P
19??–8?	Wynnum-Manly
1983	Western Suburbs	21	0	0	0	0
1984–85	Canterbury-Bankstown	42	4	0	0	16
1985–86	Salford	17	4	0	0	16
1986–87	Eastern Suburbs	22	1	0	0	4
1988	Canberra Raiders	2	0	0	0	0
	Total	104	9	0	0	36

Brian Battese (born 25 March 1961) is an Australian former professional rugby league footballer who played as a second-row forward in the 1980s. He played in the Brisbane Rugby League and New South Wales Rugby League premierships.

== Playing career ==
A South Lismore junior, Battese played with Wynnum-Manly Seagulls in the Brisbane Rugby League Premiership. He played in Wynnum-Manly's 1982 Grand Final victory over Souths before moving to Sydney club, Western Suburbs Magpies, in 1983. After one season with the club, he moved to Canterbury-Bankstown Bulldogs for two seasons under coach Warren Ryan. Although Battese started the 1984 season in reserve-grade, in April he replaced the injured Phil Gould and retained the position for the remainder of the year and played in the premiership winning team against Parramatta. In 1985, Battese was a member of the victorious Canterbury team that defeated St. George in the grand final.

Battese spent the 1985–1986 off-season with Salford City in England before returning to Australia to join Eastern Suburbs. After a move to the A.C.T. in 1988, Battese played only two matches for the Canberra Raiders before retiring.

== Post playing ==
Battese now teaches at St. John's College in Lismore and coaches junior rugby league.
