= Fred Teasdell =

Australian rugby league footballer

Personal information
- Full name: Frederick William Teasdell
- Born: 5 February 1961 (age 64); Sydney, New South Wales, Australia

Playing information
- Position: Second-row, Hooker
Club
Years	Team	Pld	T	G	FG	P
1980–82	Manly Sea Eagles	17	5	0	0	15
1983–88	North Sydney Bears	111	14	0	0	56
1988–89	Villefranche XIII
	Total	128	19	0	0	71

Fred Teasdell (born 5 February 1961) is an Australian former professional rugby league footballer who played in the 1980s. He played in the NSWRFL premiership for the North Sydney Bears and Manly Sea Eagles as a second-row and occasionally as a hooker.

== Playing career ==
Teasdell played his junior rugby league with Forestville before being graded with Manly and made his first grade debut in Round 12 of 1980 against Penrith. Teasdell played with Manly up until the end of 1982 but did not feature in any of the club's finals campaigns or grand final appearances. In 1983, Teasdell joined arch rivals North Sydney. In 1986, Teasdell got his one and only experience of finals football as Norths played against Balmain in the elimination final which the bears lost 14–7. Teasdell played two more seasons with the club and retired at the end of 1988. Teasdell went on to play in the lower grades of rugby league and captained the Newtown Jets in 1991. Teasdell is the son of former North Sydney player Bill Teasdell.
