= Greg Nixon (rugby league) =

Australian rugby league footballer (born 1961)

Personal information
- Born: 30 June 1961 (age 65)

Playing information
- Position: Five-eighth, Lock
Club
Years	Team	Pld	T	G	FG	P
1981	South Sydney	2	0	0	0	0
1982–88	Cronulla Sharks	71	16	0	0	64
	Total	73	16	0	0	64

Greg Nixon (born 30 June 1961) is an Australian former rugby league footbller.

A recruit from Gymea, Nixon was primarily a lock or five-eighth during his career in the NSWRL, which he began with the South Sydney Rabbitohs in 1981. He initially remained an amateur as he also played water polo competitively and wanted to be eligible for state representation in that sport.

Nixon played first–grade for Cronulla between 1982 and 1988. He would at times deputise as captain in place of David Hatch and had his most productive season in 1984, making 24 appearances.
