= Dean Carney =

Australian rugby league footballer

Personal information
- Full name: Dean Raymond Carney
- Born: 26 November 1961 (age 64) Wollongong, New South Wales, Australia

Playing information
- Position: Wing, Centre, Second-row
Club
Years	Team	Pld	T	G	FG	P
1983–86	Cronulla-Sutherland	72	28	87	0	286
1987–88	Illawarra	35	12	74	2	198
1989	Newcastle Knights	2	0	1	0	2
	Total	109	40	162	2	486
- Source: As of 6 February 2019

Dean Carney is a former professional rugby league footballer who played in the 1980s. He played for the Cronulla-Sutherland Sharks from 1983 to 1986, the Illawarra Steelers from 1987 to 1988 and finally the Newcastle Knights in 1989.

== Playing career ==
Carney made his debut for Cronulla in round 1 1983 against Manly-Warringah. Carney went on to become a regular starter in the team over the next four years before joining Illawarra in 1987.

Carney played with Illawarra for two years as the club struggled towards the bottom of the ladder. In 1989, Carney signed with Newcastle. Carney only managed to play two matches with Newcastle and retired at the end of the season.

== Post playing ==
In 2015, Carney became coach of the Fingal Bay Bomboras.
