= Tony Armstrong (rugby league) =

Australian rugby league footballer (born 1958)

Personal information
- Born: 8 July 1958 (age 66)

Playing information
- Position: Fullback, Wing
Club
Years	Team	Pld	T	G	FG	P
1979–81	Western Suburbs	2	0	0	0	0
1982–83	Canterbury Bulldogs	33	16	45	0	146
1984–85	Cronulla Sharks	23	9	75	0	186
1986	Illawarra Steelers	6	2	16	0	40
	Total	64	27	136	0	372

Tony Armstrong (born 8 July 1958) is an Australian former professional rugby league footballer who played for the Western Suburbs Magpies, Canterbury Bulldogs, Cronulla Sharks and the Illawarra Steelers.

== Rugby league career ==
Armstrong played as a fullback for his first club Western Suburbs, where he made two first-grade appearances. He was one of the club's best players in their 1981 reserves premiership team, scoring a try and kicking five goals from five attempts in the grand final win over Parramatta, which saw him signed up by Canterbury soon after.

Over two seasons at Canterbury, Armstrong made a total of 33 first-grade appearances as a goal-kicking winger, three of which came in the 1983 finals series.

Armstrong joined Cronulla in 1984 and finished the home and away season as the competition's leading point-scorer. He amassed 186 points in 23 games, to edge out former Canterbury teammate Steve Gearin for the accolade.

In 1986 he was signed by Illawarra and played six first-grade games before suffering a knee injury in round seven.
